= Sant Andreu de Llavaneres Archive Museum =

Museum in Sant Andreu de Llavaneres, Spain

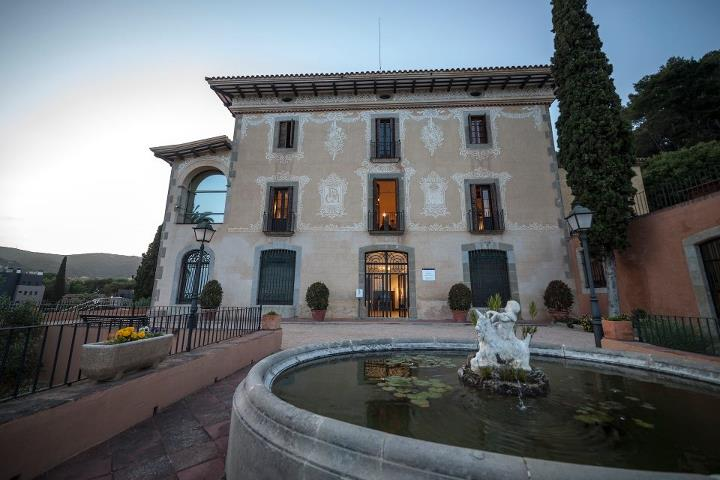
- Location: Spain
- Coordinates: 41°34′19″N 2°29′13″E
- Website: museullavaneres.cat
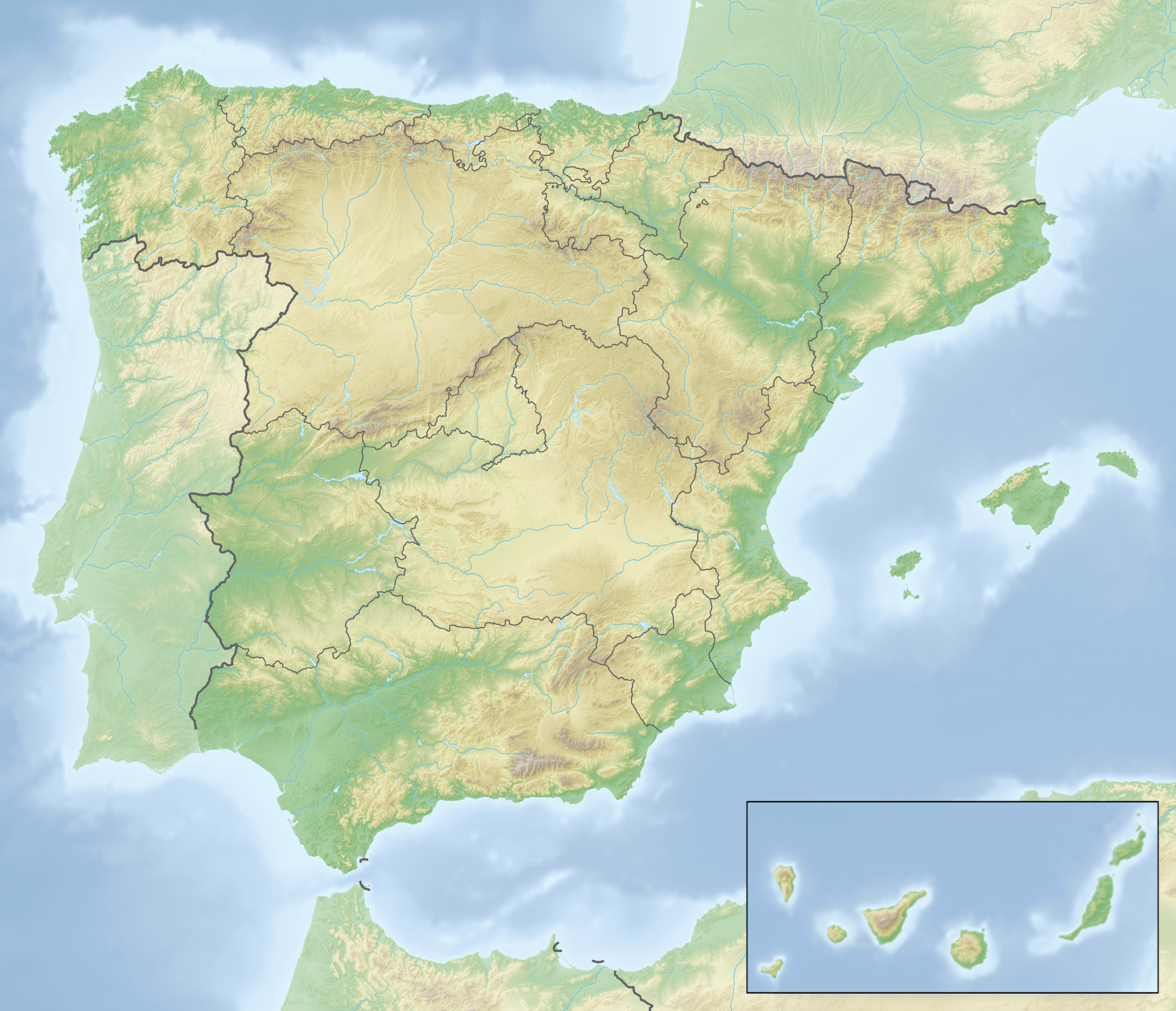
- Location of Sant Andreu de Llavaneres Archive Museum

The Sant Andreu de Llavaneres Archive Museum (Catalan: Museu Arxiu de Sant Andreu de Llavaneres), in Sant Andreu de Llavaneres (Maresme), is located in Can Caralt, an 18th-century farmhouse converted into a manor house in the second half of the 19th century. Can Caralt also houses the municipal archives.

The museum is part of the Barcelona Provincial Council Local Museum Network.

== Museum collection ==
The museum has collections of ceramic pieces, numismatics, toys, glass, an ethnographic collection of life in the field and home, radios and an extensive collection of cameras and projectors from the end of the 19th century. The art gallery takes up the entire first floor of the building and includes works of art from painters related to Llavaneres, such as Masriera, Tolosa, Vancells and Opisso, and Catalan contemporary painters such as Ràfols-Casamada, Antoni Clavé, Antoni Tàpies or Guinovart. The museum also has a room where temporary exhibitions are held.
