= Merce =

Merce, Mercè or Merče may refer to:

== People ==
- Mercè Boada Rovira (born 1948), Catalan neurologist
- Mercè Bonell (fl. 1984–1986), Andorran politician
- Mercè Canela (born 1956), Catalan writer and translator
- Mercè Foradada (born 1947), Spanish writer
- Mercè Prat i Prat (1880–1936), Spanish beatified Roman Catholic nun and martyr
- Mercè Rodoreda (1908–1983), Spanish novelist
- nickname of Mercier Merce Cunningham (1919–2009), American dancer and choreographer
- nickname of Mercer Reynolds (born 1945), American businessman
- José Mercé (born 1955), Spanish flamenco singer born José Soto Soto

== Other uses ==
- Merče, a village in Slovenia
- La Mercè, an annual festival in Barcelona, Spain

== See also ==
- Mercês (disambiguation)
