= Albert Ràfols-Casamada =

Spanish painter, poet and art teacher

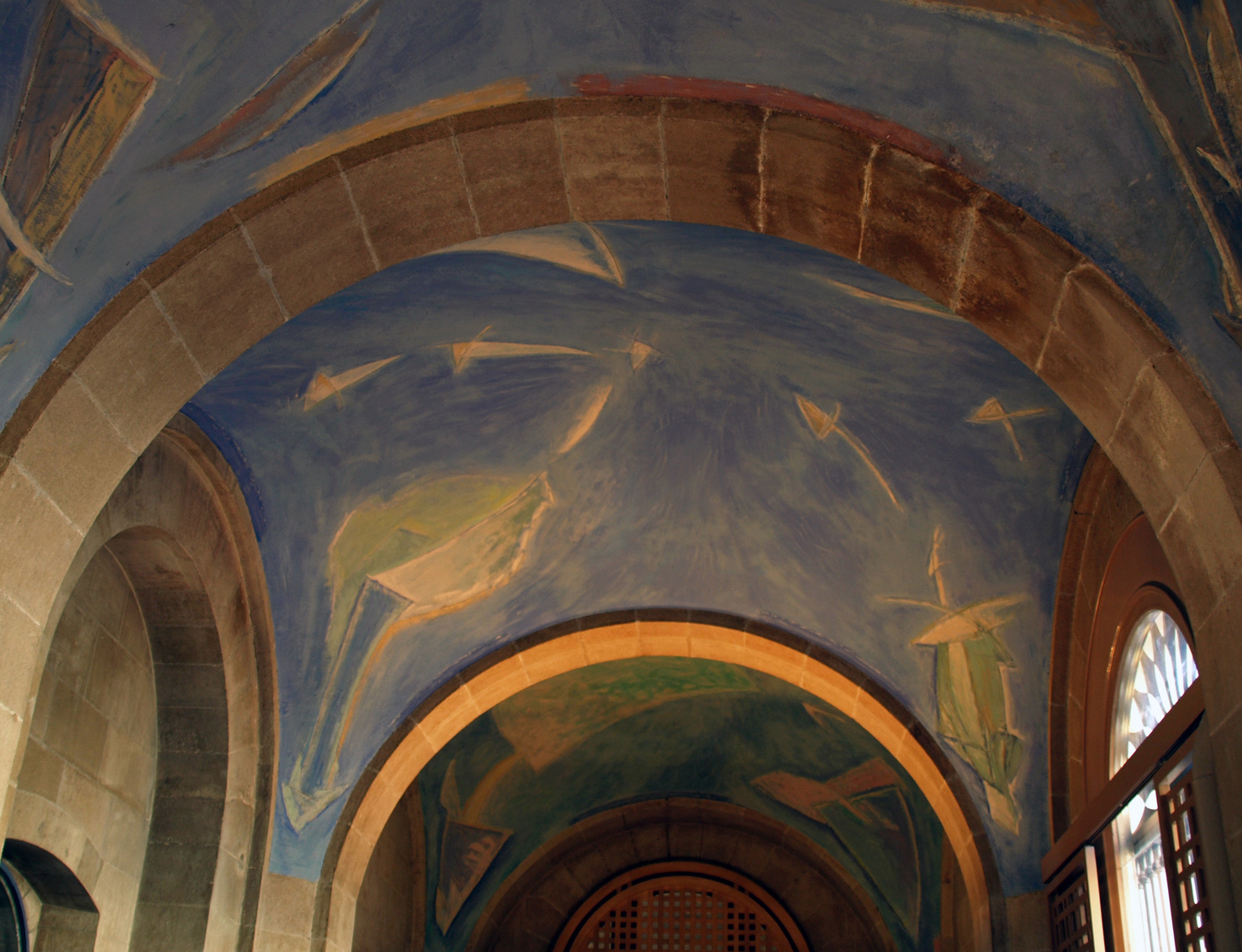
- "Les quatre estacions" (The Four Seasons, 1982), paintings on the ceiling of the Tourist Information Office in Barcelona City Hall (Plaça Sant Jaume) by Albert Ràfols-Casamada.
- Born: 2 February 1923; Barcelona, Spain
- Died: 17 December 2009 (aged 86); Barcelona
- Known for: Painting, poetry

Albert Ràfols-Casamada (2 February 1923 – 17 December 2009) was a Spanish painter, poet and art teacher involved in the vanguard movements of his time. He is considered one of the most important, multifaceted Catalan artists of his time. His artwork began in the post-expressionist, figurative sphere but soon developed into his own abstract style grounded in a poetic rendering of everyday reality.

== Biography ==
Albert Ràfols-Casamada was born in 1923 in the Barcelonese neighborhood of Gràcia, to the painter Albert Ràfols i Cullerés and to Josefina Casamada i Oliver.

Ràfols-Casamada began studying architecture at the University of Barcelona (1942–44), but by 1948, he had definitively decided on quitting his architecture studies to take up painting professionally.

He began exhibiting his artwork in 1946 at the Sala Pictòria in Barcelona, in a group exhibit of the artists' collective Els Vuit ("The Eight", comprising the poet Jordi Sarsanedas, the sculptor Miquel Gusils, the musician Joan Comellas and the painters Joan Palà, Maria Girona, Ricardo Lorenzo, Vicenç Rossell and himself) and he continued to exhibit regularly from then until his death. Indeed, the very following year at the same gallery, he already had his first individual exhibit. He received a scholarship from the French government to study art in Paris in 1950, together with his future wife, the painter Maria Girona, and other Catalan artists such as Josep Guinovart, Antoni Tàpies and Xavier Valls, and spent most of the next 4 years there before returning to Catalonia. He exhibited widely throughout Europe and North and South America. In 2001, his work was the object of a retrospective at the Barcelona Museum of Contemporary Art and the Valencian Institute of Modern Art, and he also received a tribute at the National Museum of Catalan Art in 2009.

He began writing poetry in 1939, writing in parallel to his art activities, and began publishing in 1972, when the limited-edition volume, Com una capsa, came out. In 1976, the anthology Signe d'aire. Obra poètica 1968–1978 came out to great critical acclaim. He continued publishing his poetry until the year 2004, when the last volume, Dimensions del present (2001–2004) (Vic: Eumo / Barcelona: Cafè Central) came out.

In 1952, he married the Catalan painter Maria Girona Benet, whom he had met in 1945 at the Tàrrega Art School (Acadèmia de dibuix Tàrrega) in Barcelona, where he began studying art. In 1967, together with Girona and other Catalan intellectuals, he co-founded the art and design school EINA – in the Bauhaus tradition – in Barcelona, which he directed for 17 years. He also taught art there and in other places.

In December 2015 the family of Albert Ràfols-Casamada and Maria Girona offered as a donation to the Library of Catalonia (BC) the personal fund of the two artists, which includes graphic materials, manuscripts and printed matter. Maria Fuchs Girona, on behalf of her sister Margarita Rosa Fuchs Girona, temporarily deposited the fund in the Library of Catalonia, while the final donation was formalized. Until now, the funds, textual and bibliographic, of the artists were located in different spaces.

== Works of art ==
Ràfols-Casamada exhibited worldwide and his works are present in many museums throughout the world, including, among others, the Guggenheim Museum in New York, the Centre Georges Pompidou in Paris, the British Museum in London, the Mie Prefectural Art Museum in Japan, The Meadows Museum in Dallas, Texas, the Museo Rufino Tamayo in Mexico, the Museo Nacional Centro de Arte Reina Sofía in Madrid, Museo de Arte Abstracto in Cuenca, the IVAM in València, the Museu d’Art Contemporani in Eivissa and the Museu de l'Anunciata in Alacant, and in Barcelona, the Fundació Joan Miró, MNAC (part of the Museu d'Art Modern collection) as well as the Museu d'Art Contemporani de Barcelona (MACBA).

Some of his works in the MACBA collection include:

- Interior amb figura, oil on canvas, 1951
- Blau profund, oil on canvas, 1959
- Pintura, paint on linen canvas, 1960
- Estampa popular. PIM PAM PUM, woodcut on paper, 1965
- Estampa popular. Monumento al diálogo, woodcut on paper, 1966
- Construcció, paint on wood and cardboard, 1966
- Pintura 2 (Homenatge a Joan Miró), mixed media on canvas, 1971
- Vuit vents de Cadaqués (Tramuntana, Gregal, Llevant, Xaloc, Migjorn, Garbí, Ponent, Mestral), etching, 1977
- Sota l'enramada (migdia), vinyl paint and charcoal on canvas, 1982
- Jardí d'agost, acrylic on canvas, 1982
- La Catedral, vinyl paint and charcoal on canvas, 1982
- Interiors 5, lithograph, 1982
- Interiors 6, lithograph, 1982
- Interiors 9, lithograph, 1982
- Rosa sostingut, acrylic and charcoal on canvas, 1983
- Entre les fulles, acrylic on canvas, 1984
- Abril 1, etching, 1985
- Abril 3, etching, 1985
- Barcelona Triangle, acrylic on canvas, 1987
- Crepuscular, acrylic on canvas, 1988
- Dins el roig, acrylic on canvas, 1989
- Banda groga, acrylic on canvas, 1990
- Sageta, acrylic on canvas, 1990
- Sense títol. Carpeta XXV Artistes Catalans, Sevilla 92, lithograph, 1992
- Untitled, engraving, 1996
- Tensió, acrylic on canvas, undated
- Ganivet i forquilla, oil on canvas, undated

In addition, his work is present in the form of murals in public spaces in Barcelona ("Les quatre estacions" (The Four Seasons, 1982), ceiling of the hall named after the painting and used as the Tourist Information Office in Barcelona City Hall; and two murals for the Palau Sant Jordi sports pavilion, 1992) and Lyon (Untitled, 2000, Forum of the École Normale Supérieure de Lettres et Sciences Humaines), as well as in private spaces such as his own home in Barcelona.

He also created several pieces in stained glass, such as the Virgen del Camino Sanctuary in León (1959) and the Benlloc Residence in La Roca del Vallès (1965). The stained glass windows he created for the Piscines Sant Jordi swimming facilities (1966, Barcelona) have not been preserved.

== Publications ==
As a writer, Albert Ràfols-Casamada was particularly known for his poetry, though he also wrote some of his thoughts on art in art theory pieces and in his diaries. The great majority of his work was written in Catalan, though he did publish a book on painting in Spanish, as well as several articles in Spanish. He published texts and artwork in periodicals such as El País and El Món, and such art and cultural magazines as Ampit, arc-voltaic, Ariel, Artilugi, Cairell, Kalías, Le Hangar Éphémère, Negre+Siena, Oc, Papers impresos, Reduccions and Serra d'Or.

=== Poetry ===
- Com una capsa, 1972 – limited edition object book
- Notes nocturnes / Albert Ràfols Casamada, Edicions 62, Barcelona, 1976 (visual poetry, in Catalan and English, 48 p., illustrations in b/w)
- Signe d'aire. Obra poètica 1968–1978, Llibres del Mall, Curial, Barcelona, 1976.
- Territori de temps. Barcelona: Quaderns Crema, 1979.
- El jardín, Edicions Ponce, Barcelona/Mexico City, 1979.
- Paranys i raons per atrapar instants. Sabadell: Edicions dels dies, 1981.
- Episodi. Cuenca: Antojos, 1982 (poems and etchings).
- Angle de llum. Barcelona: Edicions 62, 1984.
- Hoste del dia. Barcelona: Columna, 1994
- Estrats. Barcelona: Edicions Polígrafa, 1985 (bibliophile edition, 125 copies)
- Espais de veu. Mahón, Menorca: Druïda, 1987.
- El color de les pedres. Barcelona: Columna, 1989.
- El Passeig del poeta: poemes i dibuixos / The Poet's Walk: Poems and Drawings, translation into English by D. Sam Abrams. Barcelona: Edicions Polígrafa, 1991.
- Policromia o La galería dels miralls / Albert Ràfols-Casamada, Edicions Polígrafa, Barcelona, 1999 (collection of etchings with poetry, bibliophile edition: 440 copies)
- Espiral del temps. Barcelona: Círculo de Lectores, 2003.
- Dimensions del present (2001–2004). Vic: Eumo – Cafè Central, 2004.

==== Anthologies and translations of his poetry ====
- Four Timescapes (Longer Poems), selected and translation by D. Sam Abrams, illustrations by the author, Vol. 10 of the Beacon Literature Series. Barcelona: Institut d'Estudis Nord-Americans, 1993 (bilingual edition, Catalan – English).
- Signe d'aire: obra poètica, 1939–1999. Barcelona: Proa, 2000 (collected poetry to 1999, in Catalan, original version).
- El color de las piedras. Antología poética 1976–2002, translated by Victoria Pradilla and Alfonso Alegre Heitzmann, Ediciones de la Rosa Cúbica, Barcelona, 2003 (anthology of Ràfols-Casamada's poetry, bilingual version with Spanish translation).

=== Prose, essays, and art theory ===
- Sobre pintura. Santander: La isla de los ratones, 1985 – art theory, in Spanish, based on the authors essays on art in Catalan in the magazine "Papers impresos", published by EINA school of art.
- Correspondències i contrastos. Les arts i els artistes. Barcelona: Universitat de Barcelona, Servei d'Informació i Publicacions, 1994 – art theory

=== Diaries ===
- L'escorça dels dies: Fulls de dietari (1975–1977). Barcelona: Els Llibres de Glauco, 1984.
- D'un mateix traç: Fulls de dietari (1978–1982). Barcelona: Edicions 62, 1994.
- Huésped del día. Dietario (1975–1984), translation into Spanish by Núria Casellas. Barcelona: Ediciones de la Rosa Cúbica, 1998.

=== Illustrations in books ===
Apart from some of his own poetry books, Ràfols-Casamada illustrated the following books, among others:

- Joan Perucho – Aurora per vosaltres, 1959 (poetry), illustrations together with Maria Girona.
- Lao-Tze – Tao-Te-King, verses selected and translated into Catalan by Josep Palau i Fabre, 1965.
- Josep M. Llompart – Poemes / Aquarel·les, in Druïda 2/6, Mahón: Druïda, 1984 (poetry, limited edition).
- J.V. Foix – Set sonets, Barcelona: Papers d’Art / Albert Ferrer Editor, 1984 (poetry).
- Mercè Rodoreda – La plaça del Diamant, Cercle de Lectors, Barcelona, 1989, Diputació de Barcelona, 2008 (novel).
- Mercè Rodoreda – Mirall trencat, Cercle de Lectors, Barcelona, 1990 (novel).
- Jordi Sarsanedas – Mites. Barcelona: Columna Editorial & Club de Lectors dels Països Catalans, 1995 (poetic stories or poetry in prose, first published in 1954 by Selecta, Barcelona, then in 1976 by Edicions 62 with the illustrations), illustrations together with Maria Girona.
- Mercè Rodoreda – El carrer de les Camèlies, Cercle de Lectors, Barcelona, 2002 (novel)
- Mercè Rodoreda – Tots els contes, Vols. 1 & 2, Cercle de Lectors, Barcelona, 2000 (short stories)

== Awards and honors ==
- 1978 – Medal from the Catalan Art & Design Association (medalla del Foment de les Arts i el Disseny – FAD) for his artistic, cultural and teaching activities
- 1980 – Spanish National Award for Plastic Arts (Premio Nacional de Artes Plásticas)
- 1983 – Catalan Cross of Saint George (Creu de Sant Jordi)
- 1985 – French title of Knight of the Order of Arts and Letters (Chevalier de l'Ordre des Arts et des Lettres)
- 1991 – French title of Officer of the Order of Arts and Letters (Officier de l'Ordre des Arts et des Lettres)
- 2003 – Catalan National Award for the Visual Arts (Premi Nacional de les Arts Visuals de Catalunya)
- 2008 – Gold Medal for Artistic Merit, Barcelona City Council (Medalla d'Or al Mèrit artístic, Ajuntament de Barcelona)
- 2009 – Tribute at the National Museum of Catalan Art (MNAC)
