= Conviviality =

Basic form of human interaction

The English word "conviviality" means "the enjoyment of festive society, festivity", or, as applied to people, "convivial spirit or disposition".

== Etymology ==
=== French root (convivialité) ===
One root of conviviality originated in 19th‐century France. Convivialité is very common in contemporary French and has also established itself in English as a loanword, as well as more recently as a term in discussions about cohabitation in immigrant societies. Its coinage can be traced back to Jean Anthelme Brillat-Savarin and his book Physiologie du goût from 1825. The gastrophilosopher understood conviviality as the situation, common at the table, when different people come together over a good long meal, and time passes swiftly in excited conversations.

=== Spanish root (convivencia) ===
In Spanish, convivencia has long been interpreted literally as "living in the company of others" but in 1948 Américo Castro introduced la convivencia to mean the peaceful coexistence between different religious groups in Spain between the eighth and fifteenth centuries.

== Conviviality in left-wing politics ==
Conviviality, or Convivialism, is the ability of individuals to interact creatively and autonomously with others and their environment to satisfy their own needs. This interpretation is related to, but distinct from, several synonyms and cognates, including in French the enjoyment of the social company of others (convivialité), and Catalan popular discourse, informal neighborhood level politics, and social cohesion policy (Convivència) that views conflict in shared public space as inevitable and ultimately productive and preferable to order imposed by authorities.

This interpretation was introduced by Ivan Illich as a direct contrast to industrial productivity that produces consumers that are alienated from the way that things are produced. Its focus on joyful simple living, the localisation of production systems, links to Marxist economics, and Illich's simultaneous criticism of overconsumption have resulted in conviviality being taken up by a range of academic and social movements, including as a pillar of degrowth theory and practice.

=== Ivan Illich ===
As described here, this new usage for the term conviviality was introduced by Ivan Illich in his 1973 book, Tools for Conviviality. Illich recognised that the term in English was more likely to be associated with "tipsy jolliness" but derived his definition from the French and Spanish cognates, resulting in an interpretation that he felt was closer to a modern version of eutrapelia. Illich introduced the term as the opposite of industrial productivity, with conviviality indicating a society where individual autonomy and creativity dominated. He contrasted this with industrialised societies where individuals are reduced to "mere consumers", unable to choose what is produced or how things are made in a world governed by a "radical monopoly" that divided the population into experts that could use the tools and laypeople that could not.

As the title of the book suggests, the initial focus for Illich was how industrial tools and the expertise required to operate them constrained individuals' autonomy. He also argued that these tools alienated individuals from the production processes of goods and services that shape our daily lives and led to the distortion of use values into exchange values.

Illich broadly interpreted tools as rationally designed devices. These include hardware used to produce goods and services that ranged from small scale items like drills to "large machines like cars and power stations", but also productive institutions (like factories) and also productive systems that created what he called "intangible commodities… [like] education, health, knowledge or decisions". Examples of non-convivial tools that Illich was railing against included open-pit mines, road networks and schools, this last example linking to his previous work critiquing mass education systems, Deschooling Society. By contrast, convivial tools were those that promoted and extended autonomy, including most hand tools, bicycles, and telephones. Convivial tools share many similarities with the intermediate technology or 'technology with a human face' described in Small is Beautiful by Illich's contemporary E. F. Schumacher. In his 2012 book La sociedad de la abundancia frugal Serge Latouche also highlights the "human scale" of convivial tools.

In the 1978 collection of essays published as Towards a History of Needs Illich moved away from a focus on the tools of conviviality to explore the politics of conviviality which he defined as "the struggle for an equitable distribution of the liberty to generate use-values" that prioritised the liberty of those "least advantaged". Herein, he focused on socially critical thresholds that delimited whether conviviality was possible and argued that such thresholds should be translated into society-wide limits.

=== Contemporary uses in academia ===
In the early 21st Century, the term conviviality has been used in a variety of contexts and with a variety of interpretations. However, there is a common understanding which is dominant in the definitions and interpretations of the term: the idea of living together with difference. This concept is employed to analyse the everyday experiences, social encounters, interdependencies and community integration of people living in diverse communities or urban settings. This understanding of conviviality is used in the open access book Conviviality at the Crossroads: The Poetics and Politics of Everyday Encounters, which was published in 2020 and focuses on how people live with and are at ease with each other's differences in diverse societies. It claims there is an urgent need to bring the three concepts of conviviality, cosmopolitanism, and creolisation back into focus and into dialogue with each other. Anthropologist Brad Erickson places Catalan bottom-up convivència in contrast to civility imposed from above and explores the tension between them as shaping basic social categories and governmental projects.

Recent understandings of conviviality also often include analyses of racial difference, structural inequality, and divergent histories within a multicultural or multi-racial community or urban space, and how these factors impact conviviality and community cohesion in both positive and negative ways. Scholars also analyse the use of public space and architecture in terms of its impact on conviviality in such diverse communities. The focus on these issues has been referred to as the "convivial turn" in academia.

Conviviality has also been applied to online contexts, in analyses of the ways in which people relate to each other and build communities online.

=== Contemporary movements ===
==== Anti-Utilitarian Movement and Convivialism ====
Alain Caillé, a French sociologist and founding member of the Anti-Utilitarian Movement in Social Sciences (MAUSS), defines convivialism as a broad-based humanist, civic, and political philosophy that spells out the normative principles that sustain the art of living together at the beginning of the twenty-first century. The "ism" in "convivialism" makes clear that, on a theoretical level, the systematization of social and political-theoretical perspectives must stand in the foreground. The focus is consequently a dual one: convivialism can be seen as a social scientific or political idea, while conviviality can be seen as a lived praxis. Alain Caillé published in 2020 The Second Convivialist Manifesto: Towards a Post-Neoliberal World, signed by three hundred intellectuals from thirty-three countries.

==== Degrowth ====
Conviviality is one of the core concepts of the Degrowth movement, appearing in representative texts such as Degrowth: A Vocabulary for a New Era. The understanding of conviviality within degrowth is strongly influenced by the work of Ivan Illich (discussed above), namely his critique of development and overconsumption and his promotion of a society that values "joyful sobriety and liberating austerity", creating and using "responsibly limited" convivial tools. Illich's understanding of convivial tools as emancipatory, democratic, and responsive to direct human needs contrasts with society's current dependence on energy slaves, experts, and the growth-based capitalist model of production for its tools and technologies. These ideas, and particularly this conceptualisation of conviviality, are a central part of Degrowth theory: as such, Illich's work is considered one of the early "intellectual roots of Degrowth".

Most texts that discuss conviviality in the recent Degrowth literature are focused on technologies (including digital technologies), as an expansion or adaptation of Illich's focus on convivial tools. It is generally accepted within this literature that any technologies suitable for a degrowth society must be convivial. To this end, Andrea Vetter has developed the Matrix for Convivial Technology (MCT) as a Degrowth-oriented (convivial) tool for self-assessment of tools and technologies, political education, and research.

Conviviality is also employed in the Degrowth literature to describe things such as public spaces, goods, conservation movements, and even humans. For example, Giorgos Kallis, a prominent Degrowth scholar, refers to "...convivial goods, such as new public squares, open spaces, community gardens, etc." and the "convivial yet simple and content, enlightened human" as the ideal "Degrowth human". Although less common than Degrowth literature that explores conviviality in terms of tools and technologies, there are various examples of conviviality being used as a characteristic of many aspects of a Degrowth society, including society itself. Indeed, some scholars describe the transition to a convivial society as one of the three core objectives of Degrowth.

==== Appropriate Technology Movement ====
Based on the "intermediate technology" by the economist E. F. Schumacher in his work Small is beautiful, the Appropriate Technology movement encompasses convivial technological choice, to promote characteristics such as autonomy, energy efficiency, decentralization, local production, and sustainable development.

==== Incompleteness ====
Francis Nyamnjoh uses the concept of conviviality in his essay on incompleteness. For Nyamnjoh incompleteness is "the normal order of things", and that "things, words, deeds, and beings are always incomplete, not because of absences but because of their possibilities". It is because of these possibilities that we are driven us towards collaboration, interconnectedness, and interdependency as we try supplement our own desire to fulfill our endless possibilities through conviviality. Erickson similarly predicates convivència's capacity to facilitate change and liberation on Bakhtin's unfinished grotesque body and Paolo Freire's conception of human beings as unfinished, aware of their incomplete condition, and thus engaged in social problem solving.

== Conviviality in art and design ==
The various interpretations of conviviality also attracted the attention of artists and designers across the world. Recent exhibitions and collaborations centred on one or more interpretations of conviviality include:

- 2009: The way of tea: an art of conviviality at Kube in Poole, U.K.
- 2012: Tools for Conviviality at The Power Plant in Toronto, Canada
- 2013: Gordian Conviviality at Import Projects, Berlin, Germany
- 2017–2021 4Cs: From Conflict to Conviviality through Creativity and Culture. An international collaboration between artists and academics
- 2018: 'Convivial Tools' at The Design Museum, in London, U.K.
- 2018: 'Community, Care and Conviviality: Freemasonry in Lithgow' at Eskbank House Museum, in Lithgow, Australia
- 2020: Anna Ehrenstein - Tools for Conviviality at C/O Berlin in Berlin, Germany
- 2024: Tools for Change at HEK (Haus der Elektronischen Künste) in Basel, Switzerland

== See also ==
- Agreeableness – Personality trait
- Community – Psychological concept
- Eutrapelia – Ability of a person to have pleasant conversation
- Playfulness – Voluntary, intrinsically motivated recreation
- Rapport – Close and harmonious relationship
- Social connection – Term in psychology referring to the experience of feeling close and connected to others
- Wit – Form of humour
- Alain Caillé – French sociologist and economist
- Criticism of technology
- Degrowth – Philosophy calling for reduced consumption and production to achieve sustainability
- Lee Felsenstein – American computer engineer (born 1945)
- Gift economy – Mode of exchange where valuables are given without rewards
- Serge Latouche – French economist and philosopher (born 1940)
- Post-industrial society – Service and knowledge-based society
- E. F. Schumacher – British statistician and economist (1911–1977)
