= Clara Pueyo Jornet =

Spanish communist

- Born: 23 February 1914; Vilanova i la Geltrú, Spain
- Disappeared: 26 June 1943 (aged 29)
- Occupation: Communist militant
- Known for: Prison escape

Clara Pueyo Jornet (23 February 1914, Vilanova i la Geltrú - disappeared 26 June 1943) was a Spanish communist, member of the executive committee of the Unified Socialist Party of Catalonia (PSUC), and secretary of the International Red Aid. She was persecuted by Francoism, arrested, tortured, and imprisoned in the Les Corts prison in Barcelona, from where she staged a remarkable escape known as The Great Flight (Spanish: El Gran Vuelo), organized by the Communist Party of Spain (PCE), after which she disappeared.

== Biography ==
=== Early life and youth ===
Clara was born in Vilanova i la Geltrú. She had two brothers, Salvador and Armand. Her father worked at Pirelli. In 1924, when Clara was 10 years old, the family moved to Manresa where a branch of the factory had opened.

In 1936, at the start of the Spanish Civil War, she was in Valencia, combining medical studies with work as a typist at the Pirelli House. She was also an active member of the Unified Socialist Youth (JSU) in the Ruzafa neighborhood, as well as secretary of the International Red Aid and International Association of Friends of the Soviet Union. She was associated with illustrator and poster artist Manuel Monleón Burgos.

=== Exile and clandestinity ===
In 1939, with the defeat of the People's Army of the Republic, she fled to France. Reportedly, in exile, she had a daughter who died of starvation. She was evacuated and returned to Barcelona on 8 July 1940. She joined the underground resistance under the command of Heriberto Quiñones, a leader of the PCE. She participated in the reconstruction of the JSU, forming part of a cell with María Salvo Iborra, Isabel Vicente, and other activists. During this period, her family did not know she had returned to Barcelona. She lived with Isabel Imber Lizarralde and Soledad Real in an apartment in La Barceloneta, where Real, a professional dressmaker, had a sewing workshop named The Oasis (Spanish: El Oasis), which concealed clandestine meetings and political activities of the party.

=== Imprisonment and escape ===
On 22 August 1941, during a raid, a large amount of documentation was seized. The three were taken to the Via Laietana police station. For a month they were interrogated and tortured, then placed under judicial custody, and imprisoned in Les Corts prison.

On 19 June 1943, the Party organized the escape of leaders Albert Assa, Antòni Pardinilla, Manuel Donaire, and Ángel Olaya from the Barcelona Model Prison, who left through the main door with a falsified freedom order signed by judge Josualdo de la Iglesia. A few days later, Pueyo also escaped from Les Corts using the same method, and no one heard from her again. Her disappearance generated many doubts and a shadow of mystery, including espionage, betrayal, and the never-clarified suspicion of a possible murder.

Armand Pueyo Jornet - Clara's older brother - was killed in May 1941 in the Mauthausen concentration camp.

== In popular culture ==
In 2014, Chilean director and journalist Carolina Astudillo Muñoz reconstructed the story of Clara Pueyo and made the documentary The Great Flight (Spanish: El Gran Vuelo).
