= Arc-voltaic =

Catalan poetry magazine (1918)

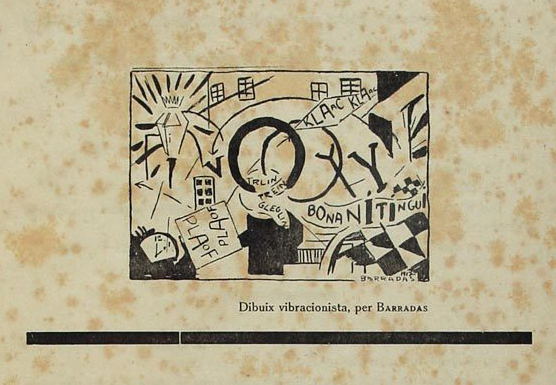
Drawing by Barradas, featured in Arc Voltaic

Arc Voltaic (in English: Electric Arc) was a Catalan poetry magazine published in the city of Barcelona.

Only one number of this magazine was published in February 1918. It was directed by Joan Salvat-Papasseit. The cover contains a drawing by the painter Joan Miró. Its authorization for the publication was done by Josep M. de Sucre. It was printed by “Art”, a company situated in Provenza Street in the city of Barcelona. The magazine cost forty five cents and it consisted in 8 pages in a format of 195-135mm. The poems are written in Catalan, Spanish and French.

== Theme and collaborators ==
This magazine had a subtitle which showed that its theme was the emotive poetry of avant-garde movement. The number consisted in only 8 pages and contained poems from Salvat-Papasseit, its director, and other authors like Emili Eroles, Joaquim Folguera, J. Torres Garcia and Antoni d'Ignacios. Moreover, it contained drawings from Joan Miró and Rafael Barradas. Arc Voltaic was very important in the diffusion of the avant-garde movement called Vibracionisme promoted by Rafael Barradas.
