= Soledad Real =

Catalan communist activist (1917-2007)

- Born: Soledad Real López; 1917; Barceloneta, Catalonia, Spain
- Died: 6 February 2007 (aged 89–90); Barcelona, Catalonia, Spain
- Occupation: Seamstress
- Political party: Communist Party of Catalonia (1933–1936); Unified Socialist Party of Catalonia (1936–1941); Communist Party of Spain (1959–1984); Communist Party of the Peoples of Spain (1984–2007)

Soledad Real López (1917–2007) was a Catalan communist and anti-fascist activist.

== Biography ==
Soledad Real López was born in 1917 in Barceloneta; her father had moved to the city to work in La Maquinista Terrestre i Marítima and her mother was an embroiderer. Real was expelled from school at the age of 7, due to her father's involvement in a strike at La Maquinista. By the age of 9, she was already earning a wage as a seamstress, working several jobs at various garment factories into her adulthood.

Following the proclamation of the Second Spanish Republic, in 1933, she joined the Communist Youth. The following year, she organised aid for refugees that had fled the repression of the Revolution of 1934. In 1936, she joined the Unified Socialist Youth of Catalonia (Catalan: Joventut Socialista Unificada de Catalunya; JSUC).

At the outbreak of the Spanish Civil War, she participated in the antifascist mobilisation to resist the July 1936 military uprising in Barcelona, before continuing her political education at the cadre school of Lina Òdena. She was a co-founder of the National Young Women's Alliance (Catalan: Aliança Nacional de la Dona Jove; ANDJ), the women's branch of the JSUC, and was elected to the JSUC's national committee in August 1937. With the advance of the Nationalists' Catalonia Offensive, she helped organise the evacuation of Republicans from Catalonia into France.

She was separated from her family and spent some time in French internment camps. In November 1939, a decree by the government of Édouard Daladier forced her, along with fellow JSUC activists Isabel Vicente García and María Salvo Iborra, back over the border at Hendaia. In 1940, she returned to Barceloneta and reconstituted local branches of the PSUC, JSUC and International Red Aid (SRI). In August 1941, she was arrested in her house, together with Clara Pueyo Jornet and Isabel Imbert, and imprisoned in the Les Corts Women's Prison. In 1943, she was transferred to the Ventas Women's Prison in Madrid, where she was tried by a military tribunal and sentenced to thirty years in prison.

After 16 years passing through various prisons throughout the country, she was granted conditional release, under prohibition of returning to the province of Barcelona. In Madrid, she returned to activism, first with the Communist Party of Spain (PCE) and later joining the Communist Party of the Peoples of Spain (PCPE).

In 1970, she joined the Castilian Association of Housewives and Consumers (Spanish: Associació castellana d'Ames de casa y consumidoras). She was also a member of the Women's Democratic Movement and of the Barcelona Friends of UNESCO. Soledad Real eventually returned to Barcelona, where she died on 6 February 2007.

== Bibliography ==
- Abejon Olivera, Maria Soledad (4 October 2010). "Soledad Real López". Diccionari Biogràfic de Dones (in Catalan).
- Hernández Holgado, Fernando (12 February 2007). "Soledad Real, comunista y feminista represaliada". El País (in Spanish). ISSN 0213-4608.
- Hernández Holgado, Fernando (2013). "Soledad Real López". Memòria de la presó de dones de Les Corts (in Catalan).
