= Rafael Barradas =

Uruguayan artist

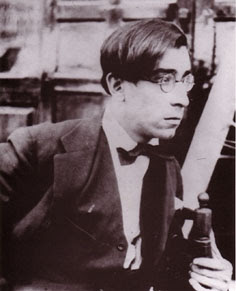
- Barradas in his Barcelona workshop (1917
- Born: 4 January 1890; Montevideo, Uruguay
- Died: 12 February 1929 (aged 39); Montevideo, Uruguay
- Known for: Painting
- Movement: Vibrationism; Cubism

Rafael Pérez Giménez Barradas (4 January 1890 in Montevideo – 12 February 1929 in Montevideo), was an Uruguayan modernist painter and graphic artist who worked in Spain.

== Biography ==
His parents were immigrants from Spain. His older sister, Carmen, was a pianist and composer. His younger brother, Antonio, was a poet who wrote under the name Antonio de Ignacios. He absorbed an interest in art from his father at an early age and was almost entirely self-taught. Magazine illustrations constituted his first professional work and, in 1912, he had his first exhibition, together with Guillermo Laborde.

In 1913, he was invited to travel to Europe with a friend who had won a government grant to study singing at La Scala in Milan. While there, he came into contact with the Futurist movement and spent some time in Paris, where he was exposed to the latest trends in art. As a result, he developed his own variation on Cubism, which he called "Vibrationism". The following year, he went to Barcelona, where he associated with a group of young Catalan poets led by Joan Salvat-Papasseit.

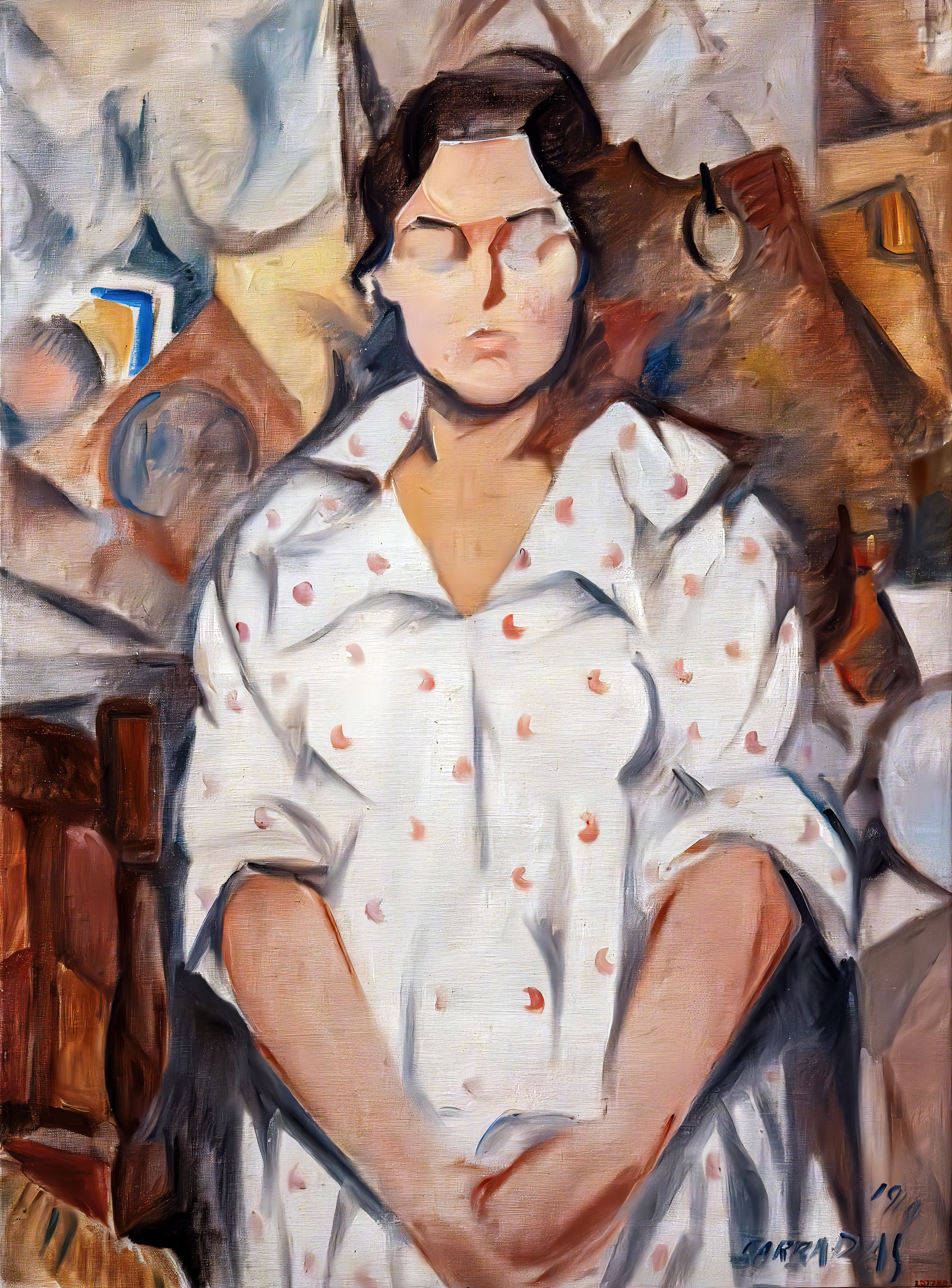
Portrait of Pilar, 1919, oil on canvas, Museu Nacional d'Art de Catalunya, Barcelona

He stayed only a short time, then started for Madrid on foot, but got only as far as Aragón, where he was overcome by fatigue and hunger and taken in by a peasant couple. In 1915, he married their daughter Pilar in Zaragoza. Later that year, he held his first solo exhibition there.

The following year, he returned to Barcelona with his new wife and reunited with his mother, who had moved back to Spain to be with them. While there, he became acquainted with his fellow Uruguayan painter, Joaquín Torres García, who had been living in Spain since 1891. Torres was apparently impressed by Barradas' Vibrationism and incorporated some of its elements into his own "Constructive Universalism".

=== Career in Madrid ===
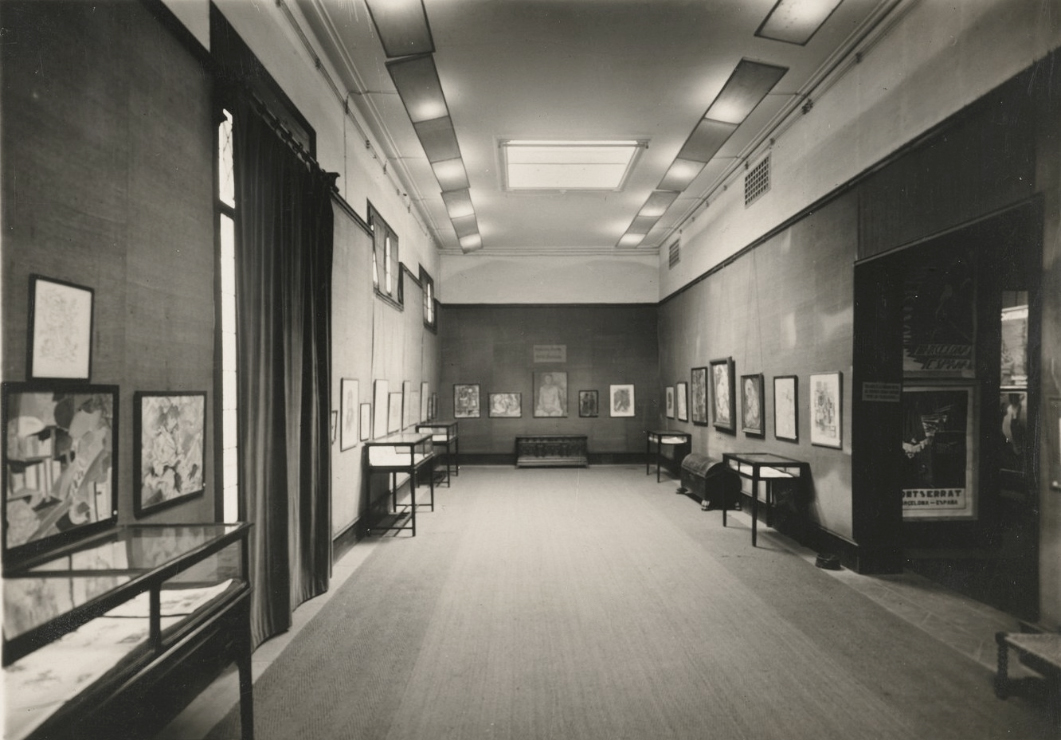
Galeries Dalmau, during an exhibition of Rafael Barradas, Passeig de Gràcia, Barcelona, 1925–1926

In 1919, he finally went to Madrid and opened a studio near the Atocha, where he was a frequent member of the gatherings by Spanish writers, poets and artists at the local cafés. Among those he befriended there was Gregorio Martínez Sierra, who commissioned him to design costumes and scenery at the Teatro Eslava. He also provided illustrations for books published by Martínez Sierra's Biblioteca Estrella, including the works of Ramón Gómez de la Serna, and was a collaborator at several art and literary magazines including Alfar, published by the Uruguayan poet Julio J. Casal.

In 1925 and 1926, he participated in several exhibitions and spent some time in Saint-Jean-de-Luz, doing watercolors of the port and its inhabitants.

After his return, he and Martínez Sierra abruptly parted company and he moved to L'Hospitalet de Llobregat, where he created a series of religious works he called "Los Místicos", followed by a series called "Estampones Montevideanos", inspired by the port and the Barrio Sur in his hometown. He expected this to be his final work as his health was rapidly deteriorating. His final project in Spain was helping to organize the first (and only) exhibition of drawings by Federico García Lorca.

He returned to Uruguay in 1928, terminally ill, and died a few months later, leaving most of his works to his family. They were kept on display at his home until 1969, when they were donated to the "Ministerio de Educación y Cultura de Uruguay", with the aim of creating a "Museo Barradas". Today, the collection may be seen at the Museo Nacional de Artes Visuales in Montevideo.

== Selected paintings ==
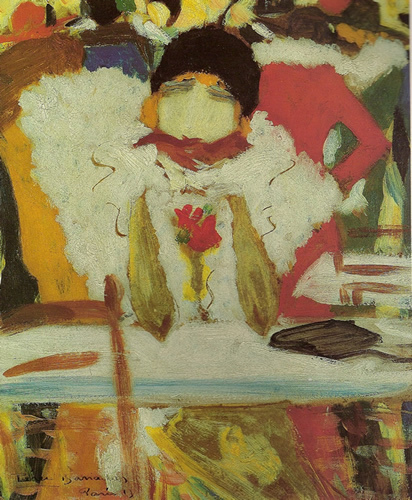
El tango, 1913, oil on cardboard, Museo Nacional de Bellas Artes, Buenos Aires

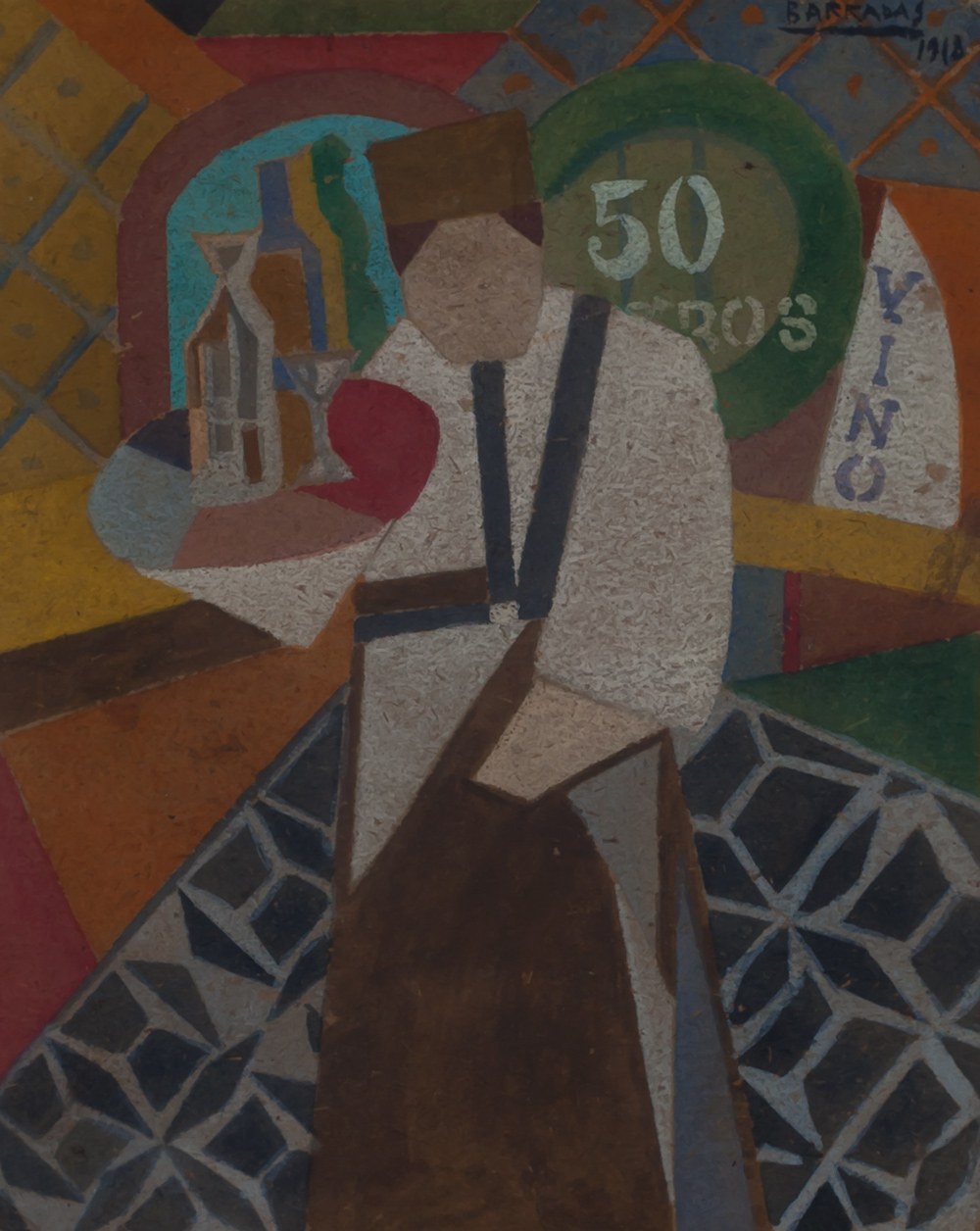
Camarero, 1918, oil on cardboard, Miguel Urrutia Art Museum, Bogotá

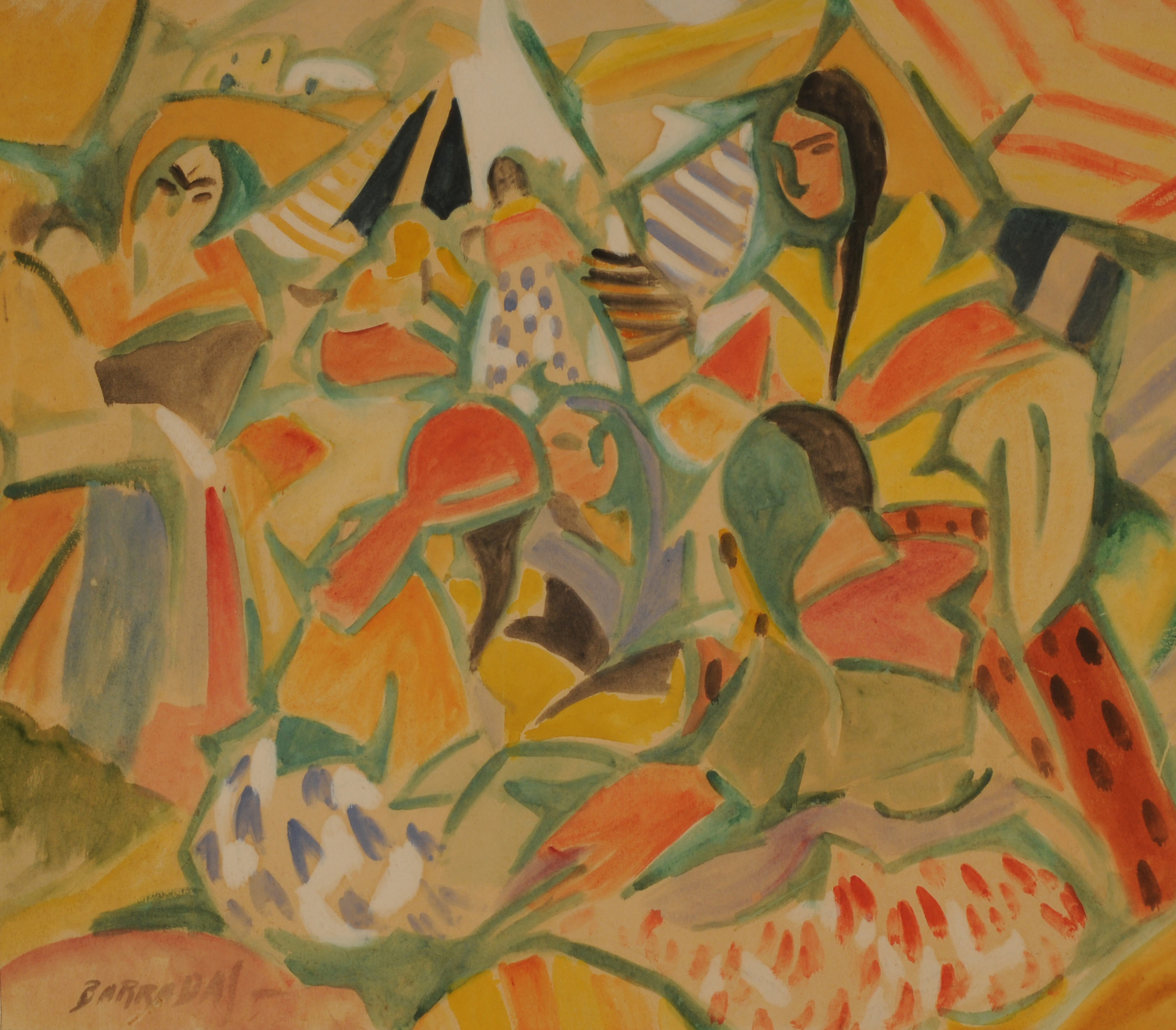
Campamento gitano, 1918, oil and tempera on cardboard, Museo Nacional de Bellas Artes, Buenos Aires

El circo más lindo del mundo, 1918, tempera and graphite on paper, MALBA, Buenos Aires

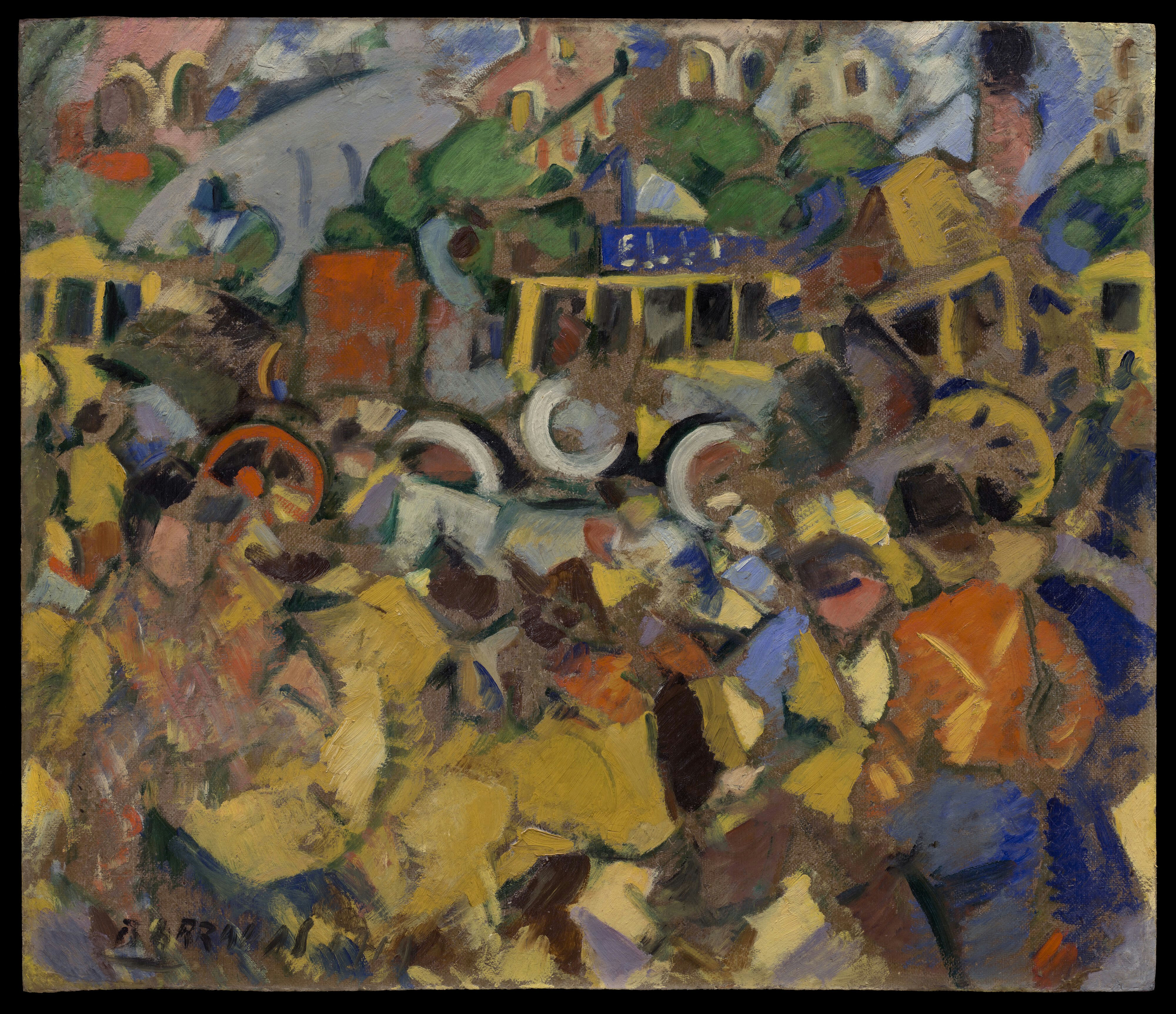
Paisaje urbano, 1919, oil on cardboard, Museum of Fine Arts, Houston

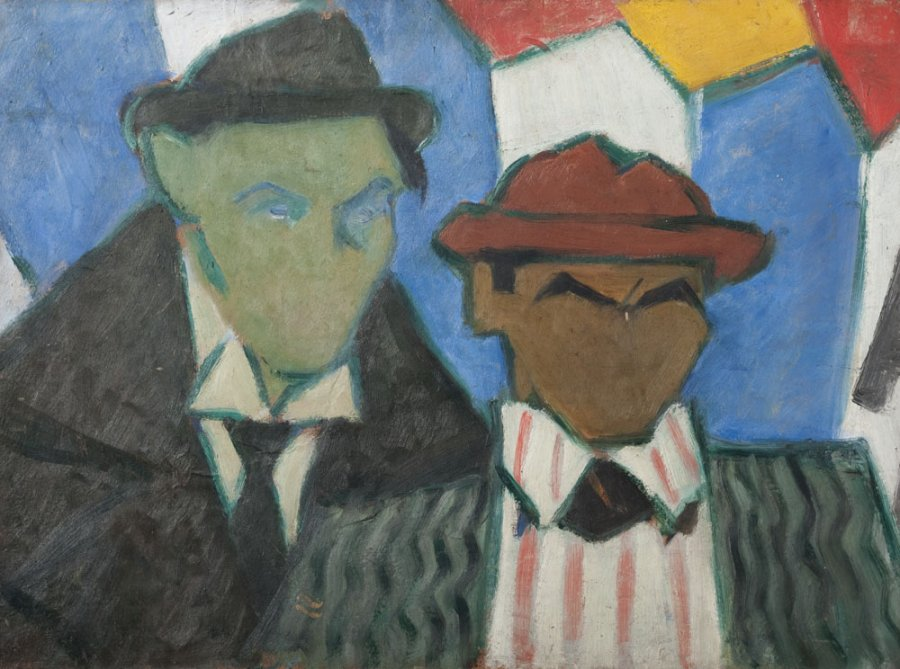
García Maroto y García Lorca, 1920, oil on panel, National Museum of Visual Arts, Montevideo

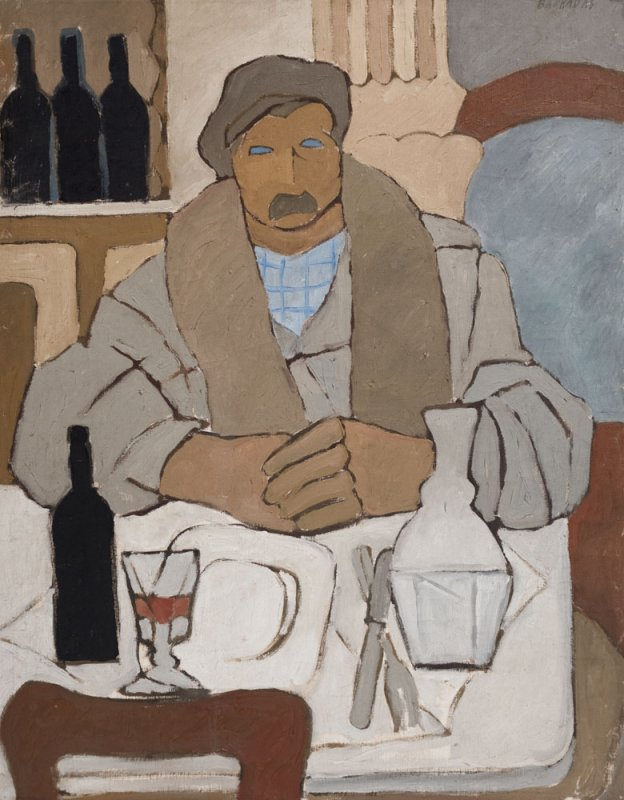
Hombre en la taberna, 1922, oil on canvas, National Museum of Visual Arts, Montevideo
