= Vilanova International World Music Festival =

Vilanova International World Music Festival is a multicultural festival of music, workshops and conferences, that takes place every year on the third weekend of July, in Vilanova i la Geltrú, in Catalonia, Spain. Started in 1981, it is the oldest world music festival in Catalonia, and also in Spain, having been far ahead of its time. The festival lasts for three days, from 11 o’clock in the morning until night. There are more than thirty activities for children and adults. Most of the performances in this event are free.

The festival is also characterized by the good atmosphere and the breadth of its audience, from Vilanova i la Geltrú locals and also tourists.

The festival is organized by Vilanova i la Geltrú Council, with Catalan national government support.

This festival belongs to the most selected group of world music festivals in Spain: Etnosur (Alcalá la Real, Jaén, Andalucía), Getxo (Basque Country), La Mar de Músicas (Cartagena, Murcia), Ortigueira (Galicia), and Pirineos Sur (Aragón). In Catalonia another important event is Fira Mediterrania in Manresa, the most important folk market in Mediterranean area.

A long list of artists (more than 300) from the Catalan Countries and all over the world (from more than sixty countries) have paid a visit to the Festival throughout its history. Some of the names on the roll have become internationally well-known and famous artists.

In 2008 the Festival incorporated, for the first time, a section addressed to children, named "Small Musicians", and another known as "Vermut Meetings", in which the artists explain to the public their projects.

In 2010 the Festival celebrated its 30th anniversary. Television of Catalonia produced a special program devoted to the thirty years of the festival, through the program Rodasons.

Also in 2010, the festival created the network Festivals with Charm, together with the festival Altaveu in Sant Boi de Llobregat, and Acústica in Figueres.

In the summer of 2010 issue, Interfolk magazine said of the Vilanova festival: "one of most important appointments of the musical summer in Spain. FiMPT was born in full effervescence of the process of recovery of traditional elements and festivities, and conceived like an open platform to every type of traditional music, coming from the country and internationally, to announce the possibilities of expression and of definition of this type of music. Three decades after its creation, it has consolidated fully and has accredited as one of the most important examples in Europe in its style and one of the most complete in its genre".
