= Josep Guinovart =

Spanish painter (1927–2007)

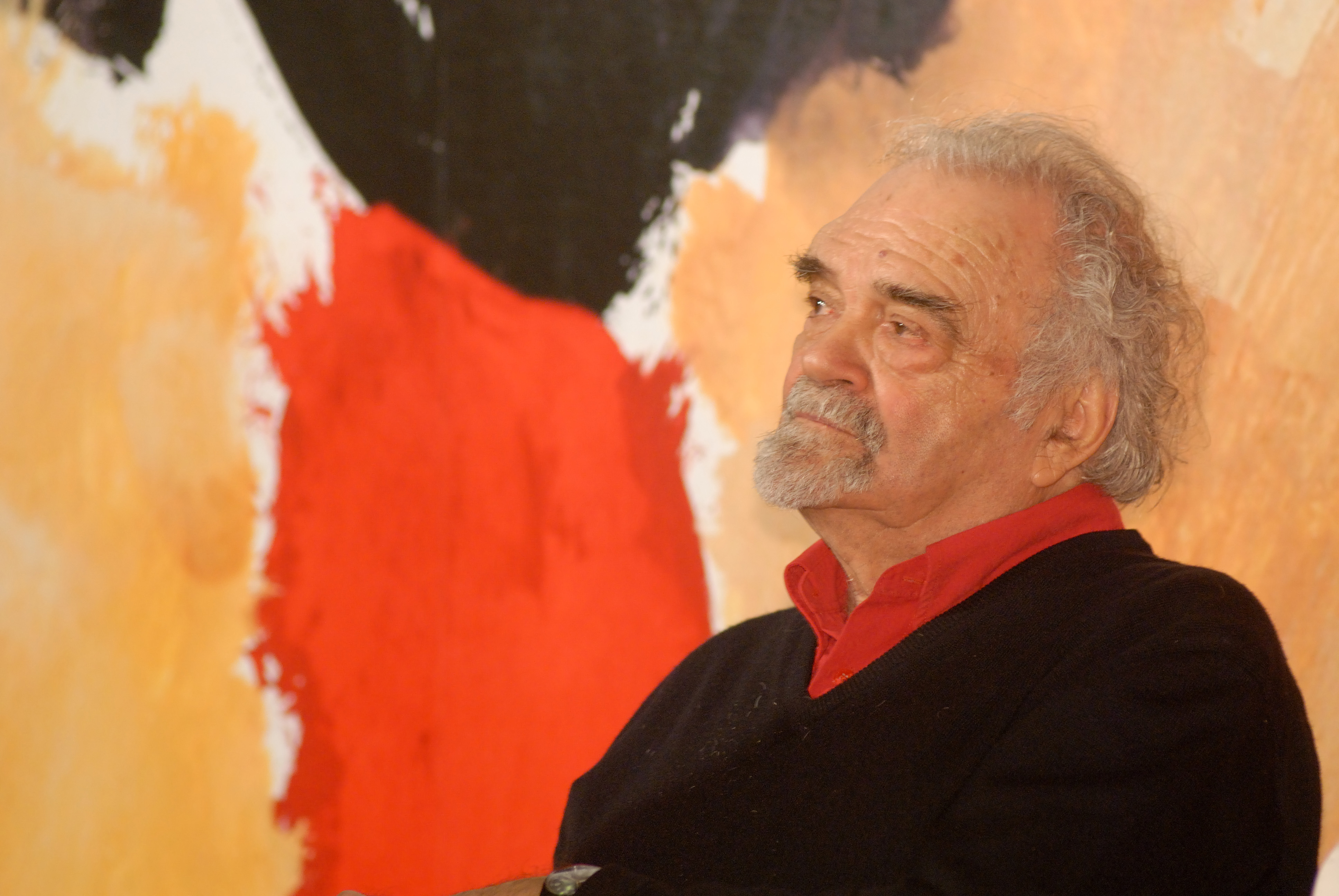
- Guinovart in the Catalonia History Museum 2007
- Born: Josep Guinovart i Bertran; 20 March 1927; Barcelona, Spain
- Died: 12 December 2007 (aged 80); Barcelona, Spain
- Resting place: Sant Gervasi Cemetery, Barcelona
- Occupation: Artist
- Known for: Abstract expressionist work
- Awards: National Award for Plastic Arts (1982)

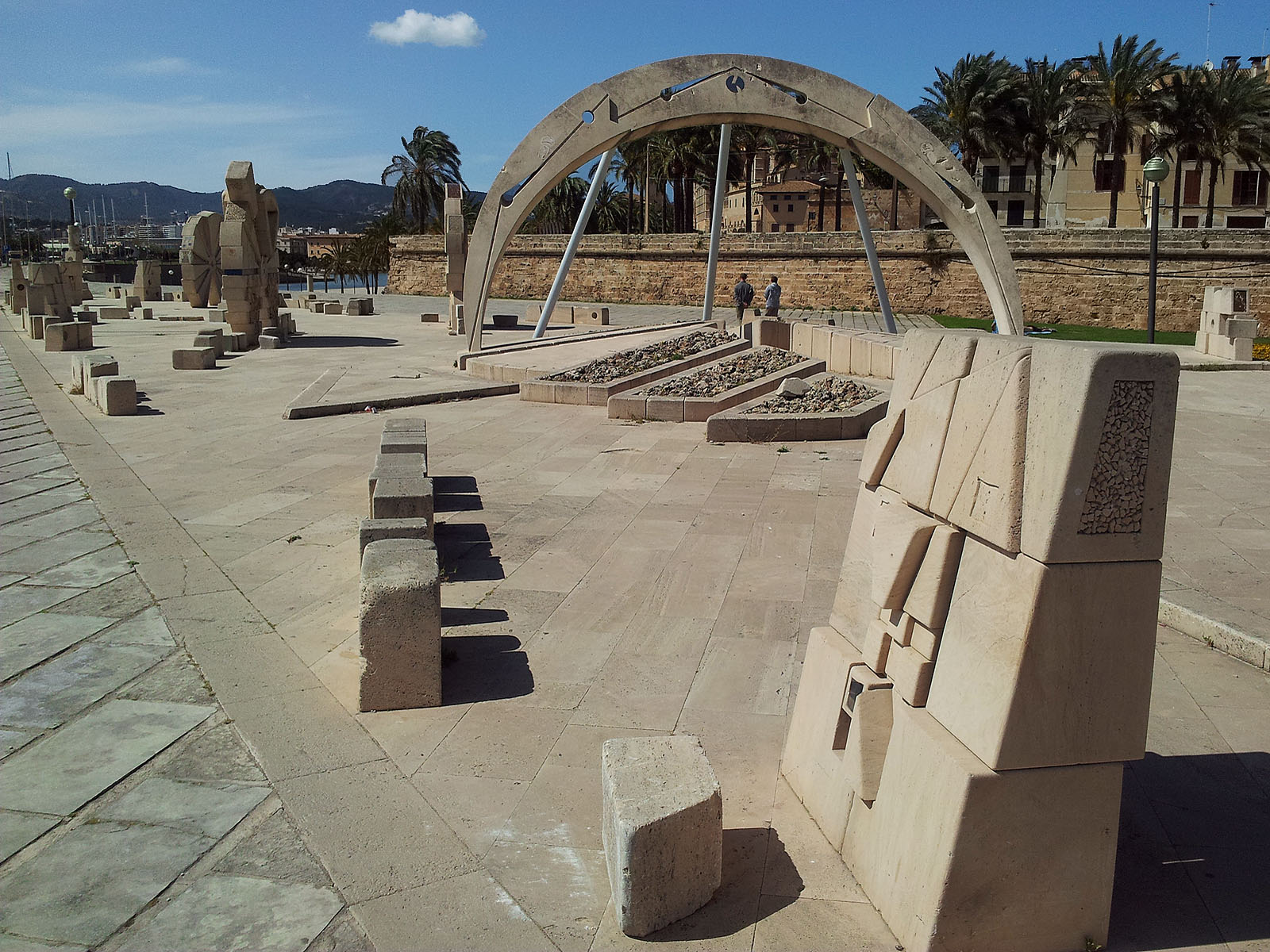
Josep Guinovart, untitled, 1985/86, Palma de Mallorca, Parc de la Mar

Josep Guinovart i Bertran (20 March 1927 – 12 December 2007) was a Spanish painter best known for his informalist or abstract expressionist work.

== Biography ==
In 1941, he began to work as a decorator. Three years later, he started his studies at the Escuela de Artes y Oficios de la Llotja (Art School of La Llotja) where he stayed until 1946.

He first exhibited his work in 1948 in Galerías Syla in Barcelona. In 1951, he produced his first engravings entitled 'Homage to Federico García Lorca'. Two years later, he was awarded a grant from the French Institute to study in Paris for nine months. Here he discovered the cubist works of Matisse and Picasso and travelled to Belgium, Holland and Germany.

On his return to Barcelona and after a period working as an illustrator and set designer, around 1957 he began moving towards abstract art. His work is highly unconventional and usually on a large scale, using a wide range of materials, three-dimensional objects and organic substances such as eggshell, earth and straw.

In 1962, he illustrated a book of poetry entitled Posies by Joan Salvat-Papasseit for the Ariel Editorial. He won many accolades for his work throughout the 1970s and 80s, including Spain's National Award for Plastic Arts in 1982.

In 1994, a museum foundation dedicated to his art was inaugurated in Agramunt, his mother's birthplace to which he always felt a special attachment.

In 2006 he designed the winery Mas Blanch i Jové in La Pobla de Cérvoles (Lleida) and created The Artists' Vineyard, a project intended to mix sculptures and other art works from different artists in the middle of a vineyard. The Artists' Vineyard was inaugurated after his death in 2010 with the unveiling of his sculpture The Countryside Organ: a music instrument, 6 meters height, for the wind to sing the vines. This winery also displays the 10.5 meters work In Vino Veritas and other artists' works.

He died on 12 December 2007 at the age of 80, a few days after suffering a heart attack. He is buried in the Sant Gervasi Cemetery, Barcelona.

== Museums and public collections with his artwork ==
- Espai Guinovart, Agramunt, Catalonia – museum dedicated entirely to his artwork
- MACBA (Barcelona Contemporary Art Museum), Barcelona
- CaixaForum, Colección Fundación "La Caixa", Barcelona
- Museo Nacional Centro de Arte Reina Sofía, Madrid
- The Guggenheim, New York City
- Casa de las Américas, Havana
- Fine Arts Museum of Long Island, New York City
- Museo de Arte Moderno, Mexico City
- Museo de Escultura al Aire Libre, Santa Cruz de Tenerife
- Museo de Navarra, Tafalla
- Museo Provincial de Vitoria-Gasteiz, Vitoria-Gasteiz, Basque Country
- Museo de la Solidaridad Salvador Allende, Santiago
- Museum of Fine Arts, Alexandria, Egypt
- Museu d'Art Modern, Barcelona
- Biblioteca Museu Víctor Balaguer, Vilanova i la Geltrú, Catalonia
- Bilbao Fine Arts Museum, Bilbao, Basque Country
- Museo de Lissone, Milan
- Museu de Pintura de Sant Pol de Mar, Catalonia
- Museo de Maracay, Venezuela
- Museo de Arte Contemporáneo, Caracas, Venezuela
- Museo Carrillo Gil, Mexico
- Museo de San Telmo, San Sebastián
- Kunstmuseum Bocchum, Germany
- Palacio de Justicia de Vitoria-Gasteiz, Vitoria-Gasteiz
- Colección Patriomio Nacional, Madrid
- Fundación Juan March, Palma (Mallorca)
- Generalitat de Catalunya Collection, Barcelona
- The Chase Manhattan Bank Collection, New York
- Caja de Ahorros de la Inmaculada Collection, Zaragoza
- Diari Avui (newspaper) collection, Barcelona
- Eina Art & Design School Collection, Barcelona
- Ajuntament de Barcelona / Barcelona City Council Collection
- Museo de Arte Contemporáneo, Madrid
- Museo de Arte Contemporáneo de Cáceres
- Museu d'Art Contemporani de Vilafamés, Castelló de la Plana
- Museu Eusebi Sempere, Alacant
