= Vilanova i la Geltrú =

- Municipality
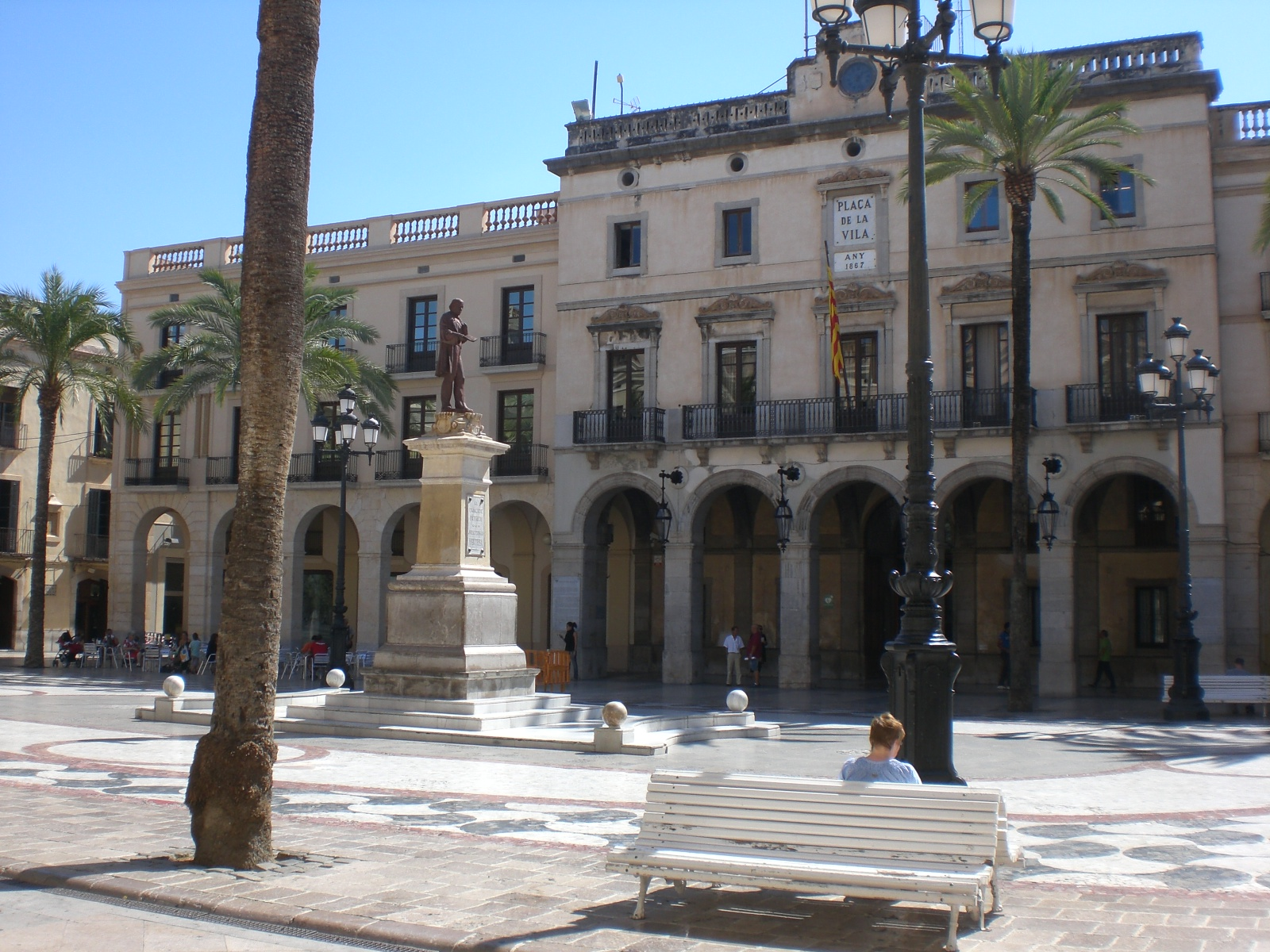
- Plaça de la Vila

- Flag Coat of arms

- Location in Catalonia Vilanova i la Geltrú (Spain)
- Coordinates: 41°13′27″N 1°43′32″E
- Country: Spain
- Community: Catalonia
- Province: Barcelona
- Comarca: Garraf

Government
  - Mayor: Juan Luis Ruiz

Area
  - Total: 34.0 km^{2} (13.1 sq mi)
- Elevation: 22 m (72 ft)

Population (2025-01-01)
  - Total: 71,641
  - Density: 2,110/km^{2} (5,460/sq mi)
- Postal code: 08800
- Climate: Csa
- Website: vilanova.cat

Vilanova i la Geltrú (Catalan pronunciation: [ˌbiləˈnɔβəj lə ʒəlˈtɾu]) is the capital city of Garraf comarca, in the province of Barcelona, Catalonia, Spain. Historically, it is the result of the aggregation of the medieval center of La Geltrú with the center built outside the medieval walls, Vilanova (which means "new village"). Initially, the lands of Vilanova belonged to Cubelles, the neighboring town. The city of Vilanova i la Geltrú has a growing population of approximately 66,000, and is situated 40 km south-west of Barcelona, with the coastal resort of Sitges some 10 km to the north-east.

== History ==
The town has a long history, and experienced an efflorescence during the Romantic period evidenced by a wealth of opulent 19th century buildings. The atmospheric town square, the Plaça de la Vila, and many of its iconic public buildings were principally financed by Josep Tomàs Ventosa Soler (1797–1874), a textile magnate who made his fortune in Cuba. A monument featuring a bronze statue of Ventosa stands in the center of the square. An identical monument stands in Matanzas, Cuba, where both statues were forged. Today, children play around the monument and agile climbers from castellers to protestors to carnival pranksters climb the statue and adorn it with their own symbols (see photo).

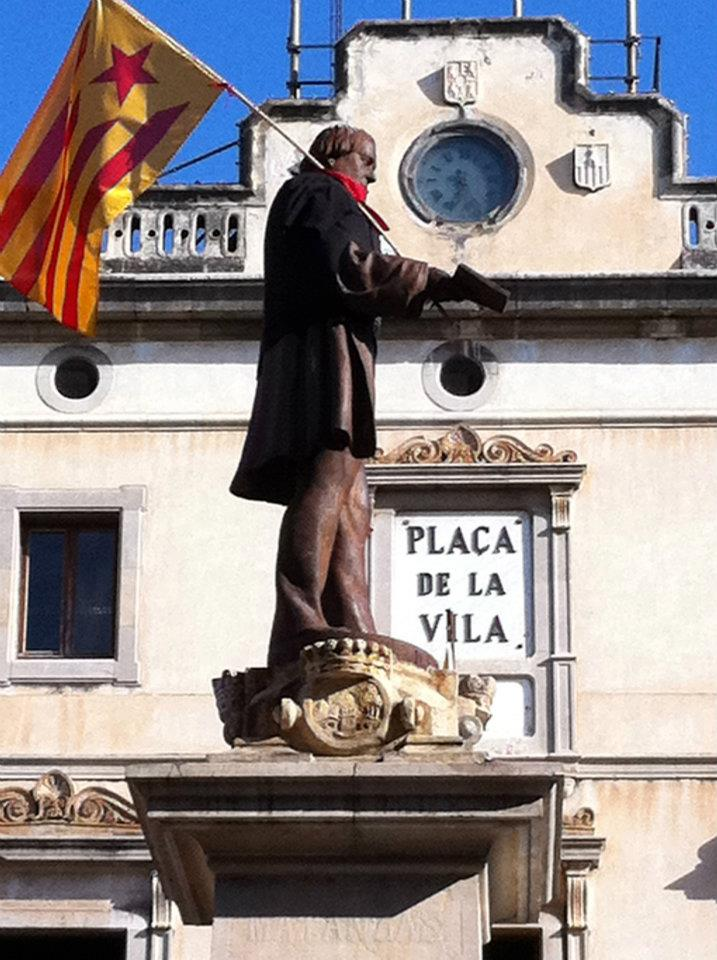
Statue of city benefactor Josep Ventosa holding the estelada or Catalan independence flag

During the Spanish Civil War, large numbers of people fleeing poverty in Southern Spain settled in Vilanova. Although they experienced prejudice they became increasingly accepted and known as els altres Vilanovins or "the other Vilanovins." By 1970, a majority of the town's population had been born elsewhere. In the first decade of the 21st century, there was another wave of immigrants (called nouvinguts or "newcomers" locally), this time primarily from North Africa, South America and Eastern Europe.

== Economy ==
Agriculture and the maritime trade in wine were the traditional sources of income during the 18th and 19th centuries. Today, while agriculture and a significant fishing fleet continue to be sources of income, the primary economic activity is industry in the sectors of metal, textile and chemicals.

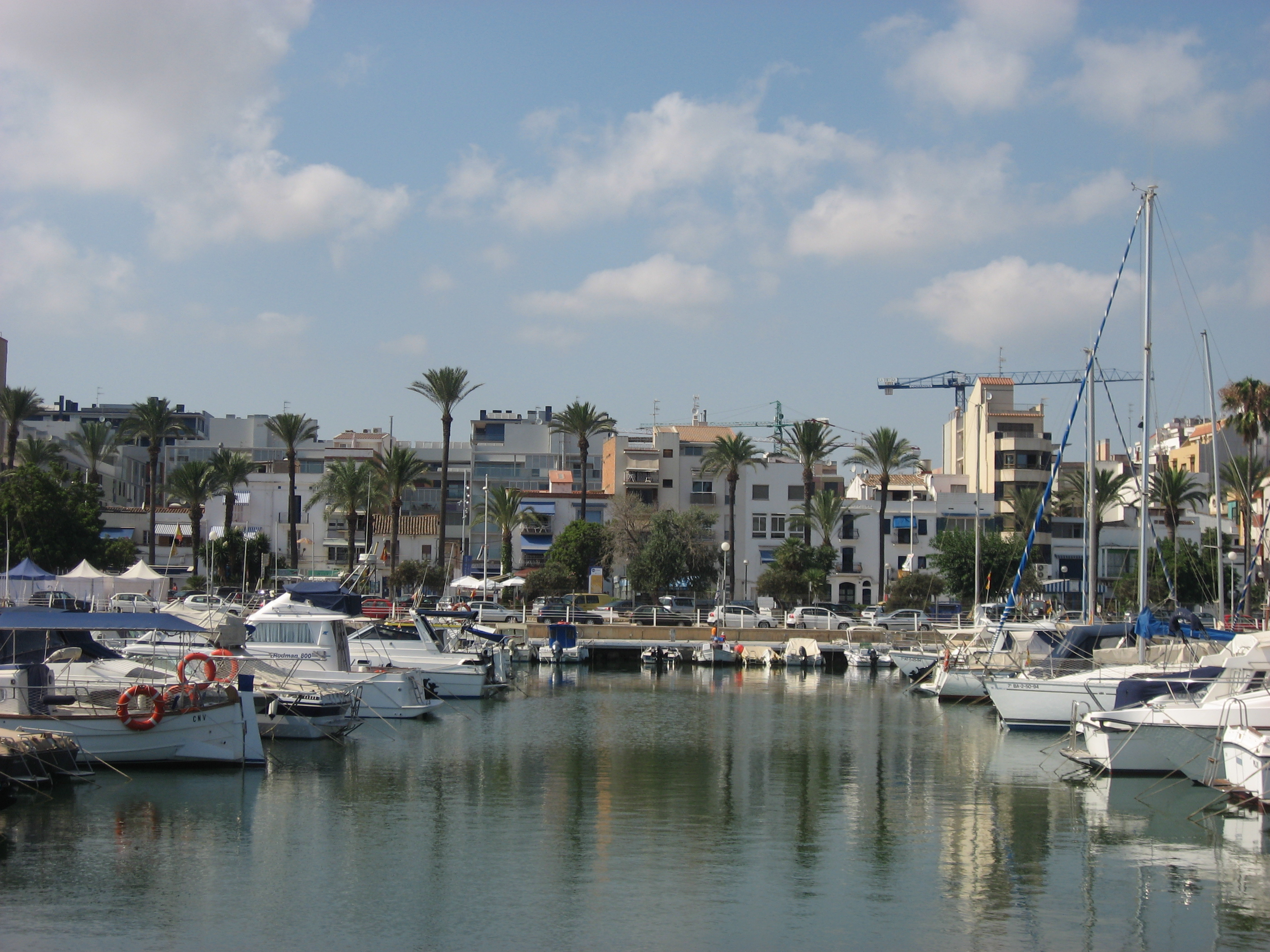
View from Club Nautico Vilanova

Vilanova i la Geltrú has embraced new technologies for generations and has had a vocational and traditional university since 1902, along with the UPC (Polytechnic University of Catalonia). The building Neapolis Public Innovation Agency for ICT and multimedia was built in 2006.

Located 45 km from Barcelona and 45 km from Tarragona, it has the third-largest port in Catalonia and is a major fishing port. The Brotherhood of Pescadors of Vilanova derives from the powerful and ancient Brotherhood of Sant Elm (founded in 1579). In 1921 the new Pòsit de Pescadors (Fishermen's Archive) was founded. Today fresh fish may be purchased directly on the internet fish auction. Vilanova i la Geltrú has an Estació Nàutica which hosts major sailing competitions at the national and international levels.

The city has seven Civic Centers that provide social services, host cultural activities and promote civic participation and convivència or engaged relations between neighbors. On April 7, 2014, the city enacted a Municipal Ordinance to Promote Civility and Convivència with the objective of establishing norms of mutual respect, social cohesion and full respect for the dignity and rights of a plurality of expressions and cultural forms. Vilanova's office of the Consortium for Linguistic Normalization offers free courses in the Catalan language and other services in the welcome of newcomers.

Special programs are offered at the University Campus of the Mediterranean Interdisciplinary Reference Center, including courses in Society, Culture and Tourism, Environment, Information Society, Science and Technology, and Economics and Business.

The University Campus of the Mediterranean is an initiative of the City Council of Vilanova i La Geltrú, the Polytechnic University of Catalonia and European Institute of the Mediterranean under the aegis of the Municipal Institute of Education and Work (IMET).

One of the centers of research, development and innovation is found in a unique building designed by the Catalan architect Oriol Bohigas i Guardiola, Edifici Neapolis. This building is part of the European Network of Living Labs (ENoLL). In 2012, it initiated the Co-Working Center coinciding with the International Year of Cooperatives recognized by the United Nations.

Its population has increased in recent years. Currently several large projects are underway such as the extension of the beach, the polygon Sant Jordi (St. George) pattern 'Catalunya', and the future redevelopment of the waterfront.

== Transport ==
Vilanova is linked to the region by highway C-32, also known as highway Pau Casals, or to the Garraf Barcelona motorway providing a connection to Barcelona–El Prat Airport, the highway C-15, also known by the name Eix Diagonal, which links the historic town of Manresa and Autovía A-7 with the Mediterranean Sea.

The Railway of Vilanova is of vital importance. Built between 1882 and 1884 by the developer and director of roads Jeroni Granell i Mundet the railway links the Rodalies line of Sant Vicenç de Calders – Maçanet de la Selva and connects to the imperial Roman city of Tarragona, the town of Tortosa, the town of Reus, and the city of Lleida.

The GR 92 long-distance footpath, which roughly follows the length of the Mediterranean coast of Spain, has a staging point at Vilanova i la Geltrú. Stage 22 links northwards to Garraf, a distance of 22.0 kilometres (13.7 mi), whilst stage 23 links southwards to Calafell, a distance of 13.4 kilometres (8.3 mi).

== Culture ==
The traditional and popular festivals (festes) celebrated in Vilanova i la Geltrú are among the richest and most varied in Catalonia. Locals say that Vilanovins "always have a leg in the air" referring to their festive proclivity. And it is through participating in local festivals that Vilanovins, whether natives or recently arrived newcomers, intensify their sense of belonging to a community dedicated to active engagement between neighbors or convivència. Carnaval, held in late February, culminates in a week-long debauch of dances, masquerades, social satire, mock battles, permitted disrespect, feasts, processions, and pranks all in honor of Sa Majastat el Rei Carnestoltes (His Majesty the King Carnival) also known as the "king of the senseless" celebrated for his prodigious sexual prowess and devastating satire. Up to a third of the population participates in Les Comparses, a couples dance in which rival groups hurl hard candies at one another in what is called the Sweet War. Children are given a day off school to celebrate Dijous Gras (Fat Thursday) during which they celebrate the Merengada, a day long orgy of eating and fighting with sticky sweet meringue, leaving a sticky residue throughout the town. While many of the acts of carnaval remain constant, every year there are innovations and topical satire attacking the foibles of the rich, powerful, inept and corrupt.

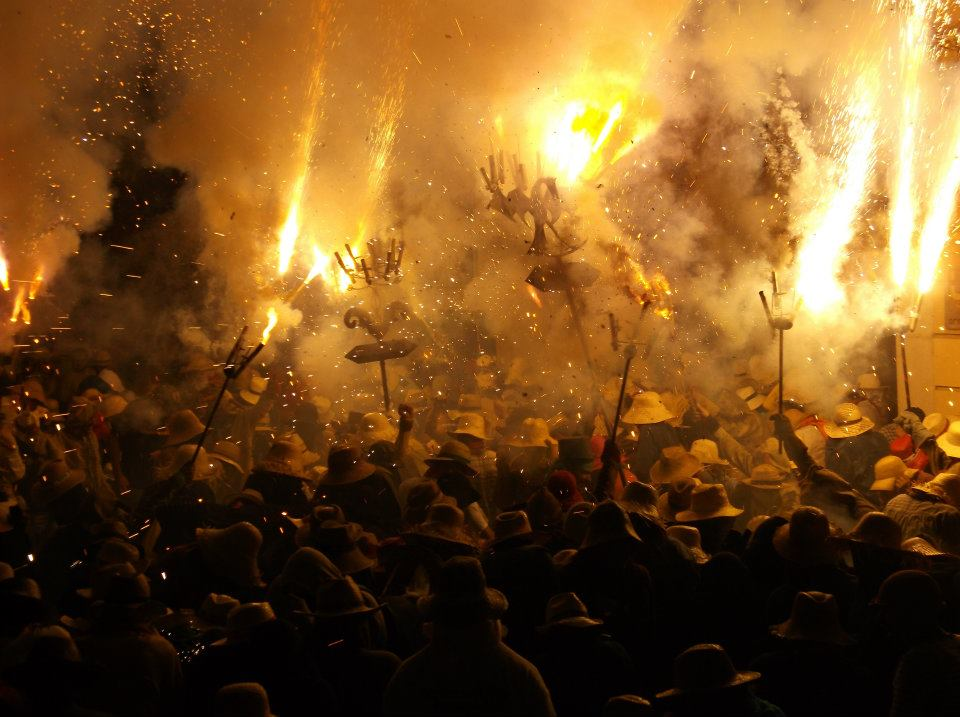
Correfoc, Festa Major 2012, Vilanova i la Geltrú

Since 1784, Vilanovins have celebrated their Festa Major in early August, dedicated to the city's patron saint, the Virgin of the Snows (Mare de Déu de les Neus). Processions begin with a correfoc of ritual devils led by the Ball de Diables de Vilanova i la Geltrú, established in 1832 and one of eight dances of devils in Catalonia with a history of one hundred years or more. The processions include traditional dances by costumed figures including the dances of the Serrallonga, Ball de Bastons, Cintes, Panderos, Cap-grossos (big-headed dwarfs), Cercolets, Pastorets, Gitanes, and Valencians; imaginary beings such as Gegants (giants), Dracs (fire-breathing dragons), and Mulasses (demonic Mules), and the construction of towering human castles (castell). Other festes celebrated in Vilanova include Tots Sants (November 1), Nadal (December 25), Cap d'Any (January 1), els Tres Tombs (January 17), la Diada de Sant Jordi (April 23), Nit de Sant Joan (St John's Night) and Sant Pere (St Peter's Day). Of international importance is the "Festival Internacional de Música Popular Tradicional", Vilanova International World Music Festival, which has been held since 1981 and is the oldest world music festival in Spain.

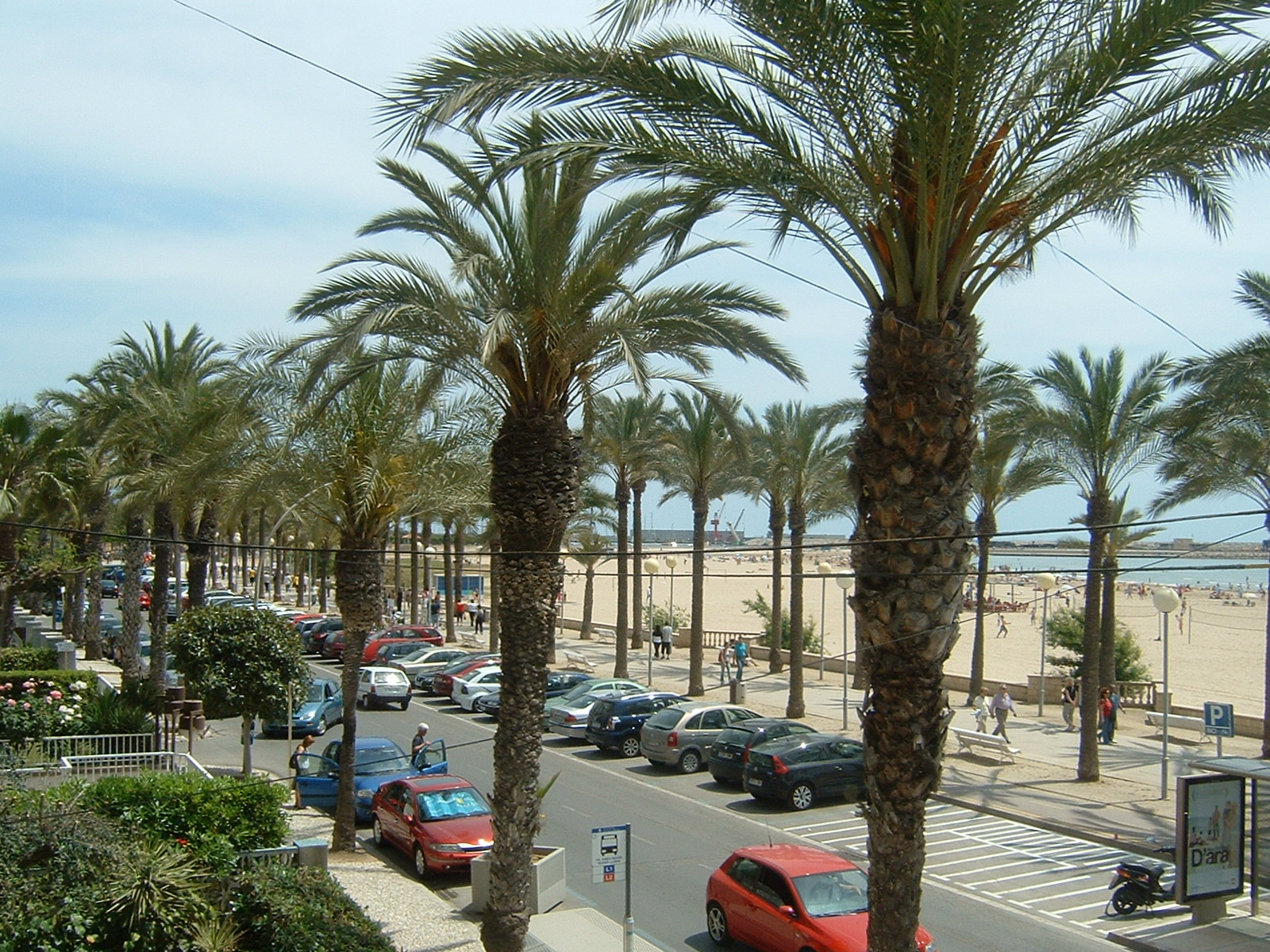
The Passeig Ribes Roges, along the beach, on a Sunday afternoon in May

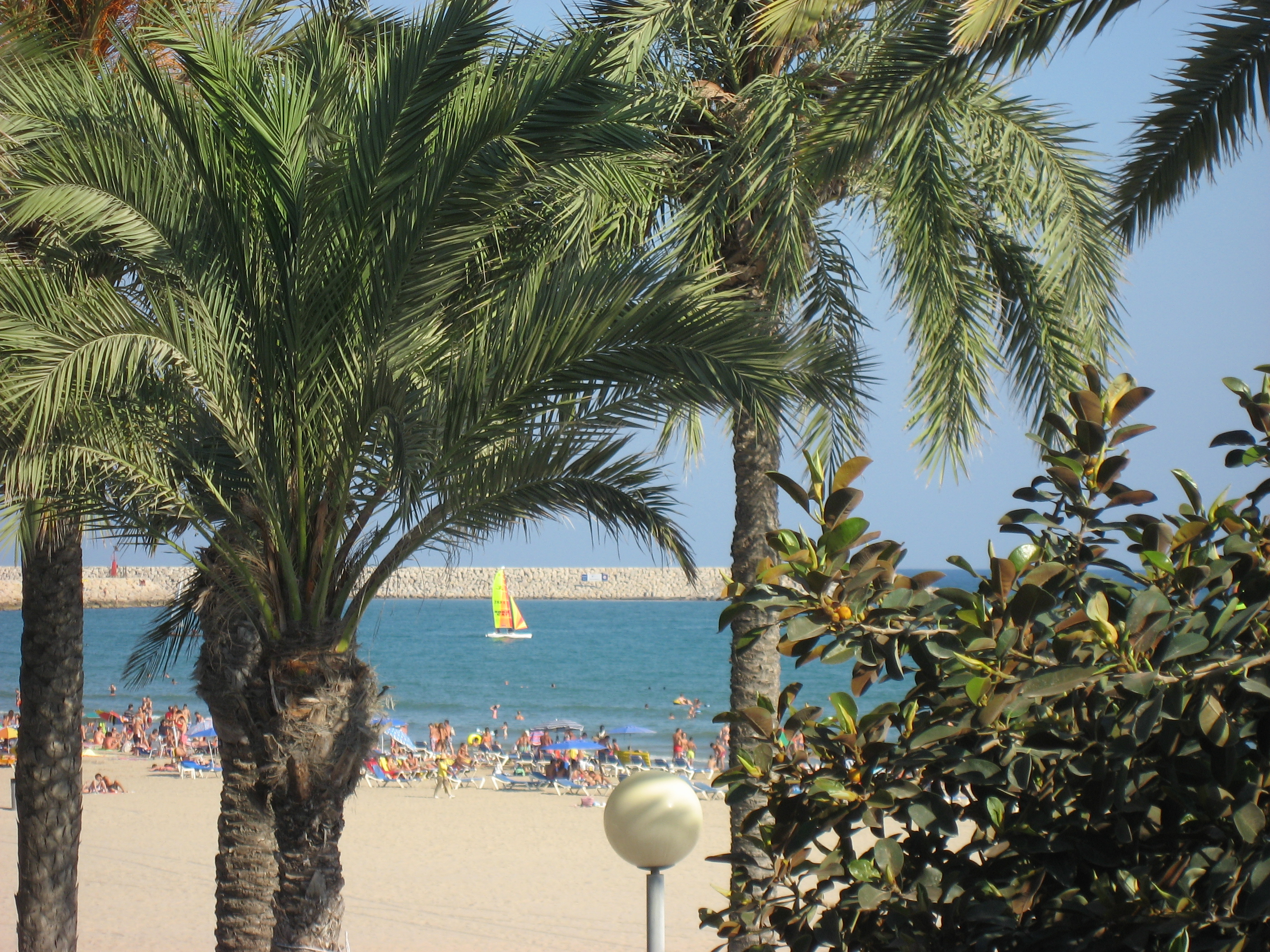
Beachview

Vilanova has a museum, founded by the Catalan poet, historian and diplomat, Víctor Balaguer (1824–1901), the Biblioteca Museu Víctor Balaguer, which contains collections of Roman, Egyptian and prehistoric antiquities, as well as paintings, engravings, sculptures, coins and a large library. Vilanova also has a railway museum, the Museu del Ferrocarril de Vilanova i la Geltrú which contains one of the largest collections of historic steam engines in the world.

Apart from traditional seafood restaurants, and cutting edge presentations of local foods at culinary destinations such as L'Oganquit and Genito, Vilanova is a recognised centre for xató, a winter salad dressed with a rich sauce made from almonds, olives, fish, oil and garlic, which forms the basis for the Festival of Xató (Xatonada) in tandem with nearby villages and towns. Other local innovations include glòries, elaborate confections of meringue presented during carnaval that may be a dying tradition, and the Mig-Mig, a refreshing summer drink invented at the gelateria Cal Llorens, is a fifty-fifty blend of orxata de xufa made from tigernuts and granissat de llimona or pulverized ice with lemon syrup.

== Folklore ==
Tradition maintains that Vila Nova (the new town) was founded by people fleeing the abuses of the feudal lord of the castle la Geltrú, particularly his exercise of the Droit du seigneur or jus primae noctis but there is no evidence that this is the case. Other traditions recount conflicts with invading Moors, the coming of the railroad, the inaccessible tunnels beneath the city and stories of a youth confounded by the reflection of the full moon in the water from which Vilanovins receive the nickname llunàtics (lunatics), in reference to a supposed mercurial quality of unpredictable emotions. Rather than a static tradition, folklore and festa in Vilanova are often used as a public way to respond to current events from immigration to national politics or to defy fears of new epidemics. In an annual children's Christmas play, the troubling ethnic caricature of the Moorish pirate, Moro Manani was replaced by the traditional Catalan figure the Caganer and the avian flu scare was satirized in 2006 by the carnaval figure Moixó Foguer.

== Sports ==
The city has a roller hockey team, CP Vilanova, one of the most important in Spain, and a member of the main national roller hockey league OK Liga. In 2011 Vilanova hosted the CERS Cup Final Four.

The city is also home to CF Vilanova, a football club.

The city is the birthplace of 3 time Ballon d'Or winner Aitana Bonmati.

== Notable people ==
- Francesc Macià (1859–1933), President of Catalonia from 1932 to 1933
- Clara Pueyo Jornet (1914), member of underground resistance to Francoism
- Mercè Foradada (1947), writer
- Marc Soler (1993), professional cyclist
- Aitana Bonmatí (1998), professional footballer for the Spain national team
