= Carmen Barradas =

Uruguayan pianist, composer, and choral teacher

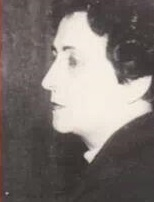
Carmen Barradas

Maria del Carmen Perez Jimenez Barradas (18 March 1888 – 12 May 1963) was a Uruguayan pianist, composer, and choral teacher.

== Life ==
Maria del Carmen Pérez Jiménez was born in Montevideo, the daughter of Spanish residents Santos Rojas and still life painter Antonio Pérez Giménez Barradas. She first studied with Antonio Frank, but ended the study after her father died in 1898. With support from friends and family, she later continued with Aurora Pablo and M. Lopes Vicente at the Conservatorio del Uruguay, receiving her diploma in 1915. Following the example of her younger brother, the painter Rafael Barradas, she adopted the stage name Carmen Barradas. Her youngest brother was writer and poet Antonio De Ignacios.

After World War I, Rafael Barradas found he was unable to return from Spain to Uruguay, so in 1916 Barradas' family moved to Spain. The family struggled to get there, having to apply for entry as laborers. Once in Spain, Carmen and her mother supported themselves by making toys. However, Carmen also developed as a composer and actively participated in the artistic life of Barcelona. In 1917, she gave a concert of her own works.

Barradas lived and composed in Spain until 1922, then returned with her family to Montevideo in 1928, where she took a position teaching at the Institutos Normales. During this period, she published a magazine for children called Andresillo which included cartoons and songs. Her works pioneered the use of non-traditional graphic notation and experimental techniques. Barradas produced her own works at the Teatro Solís in 1934 and ended her composing career in 1949. She died in Montevideo.

Although her works were described as "brilliant," her experimental direction was not well received in Uruguay during her lifetime. Many of her works were lost at her death. However, pianist and musicologist Néffer Kröger retained and interpreted some of the scores. About 170 partial and complete manuscripts are left.

== Works ==
Selected works include:

- Fabricación, 1922
- Andaluza
- la niña de la mantilla blanca
- Aserradero
- Taller Mecánic,
- En el molino y Procesión
- Aurora en la enramada
- Mar-Tragedia-Misterio
- Estudios tonales
