= Sant Gervasi Cemetery =

Cemetery in Spain

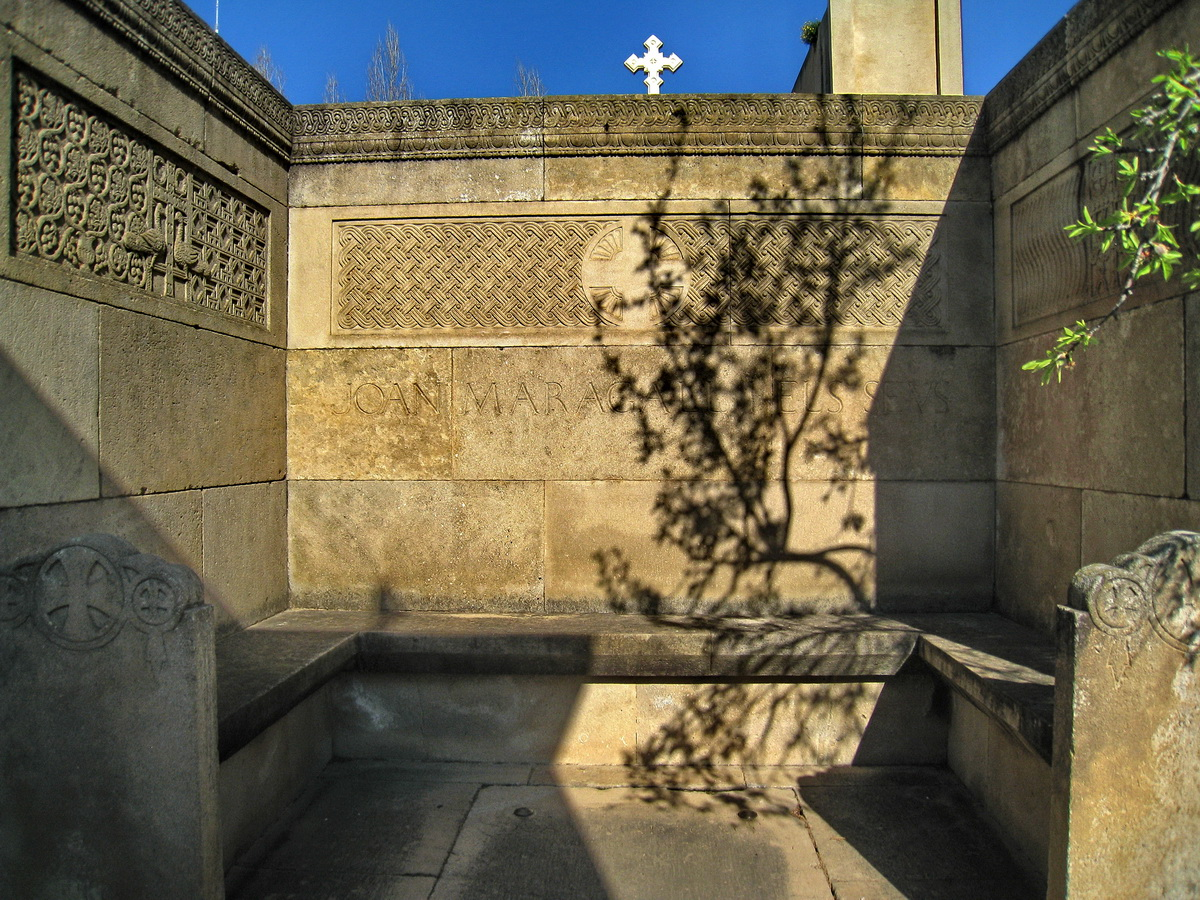
- Sant Gervasi Cemetery
- Interactive map of Sant Gervasi Cemetery

Details
- Established: 1853
- Location: Barcelona
- Country: Spain
- Coordinates: 41°25′N 2°08′E
- Type: Public
- Owned by: Cementiris de Barcelona S.A.
- Size: 12,229 square metres (3.022 acres)
- No. of graves: 4773

Sant Gervasi Cemetery founded in 1853, is located in the district of Sarrià-Sant Gervasi in Barcelona, Spain. With an extension of 12,229 m², the area divided into two parts by a staircase leading to the cemetery chapel. It includes 4773 plots. Numerous sculptures and ornaments, mainly in the style of eclecticism, decorate the tombs.

== Notable interments ==
- Xavier Montsalvatge (1912- 2002), Spanish composer
- Joan Maragall (1860-1911), Spanish Catalan poet, journalist and translator
- Darío de Regoyos (1857-1913), painter
- Felip Pedrell (1841-1922), composer
- Lluís Domènech i Montaner (1850-1923), Catalan architect who was highly influential on Modernisme català
- Enric Clarasó (1857-1941), modernist Catalan sculptor
- Joan Lamote de Grignon (1872-1949), pianist, composer and orchestra director
- Josep Guinovart (1927-2007), painter
