= Mercè Foradada =

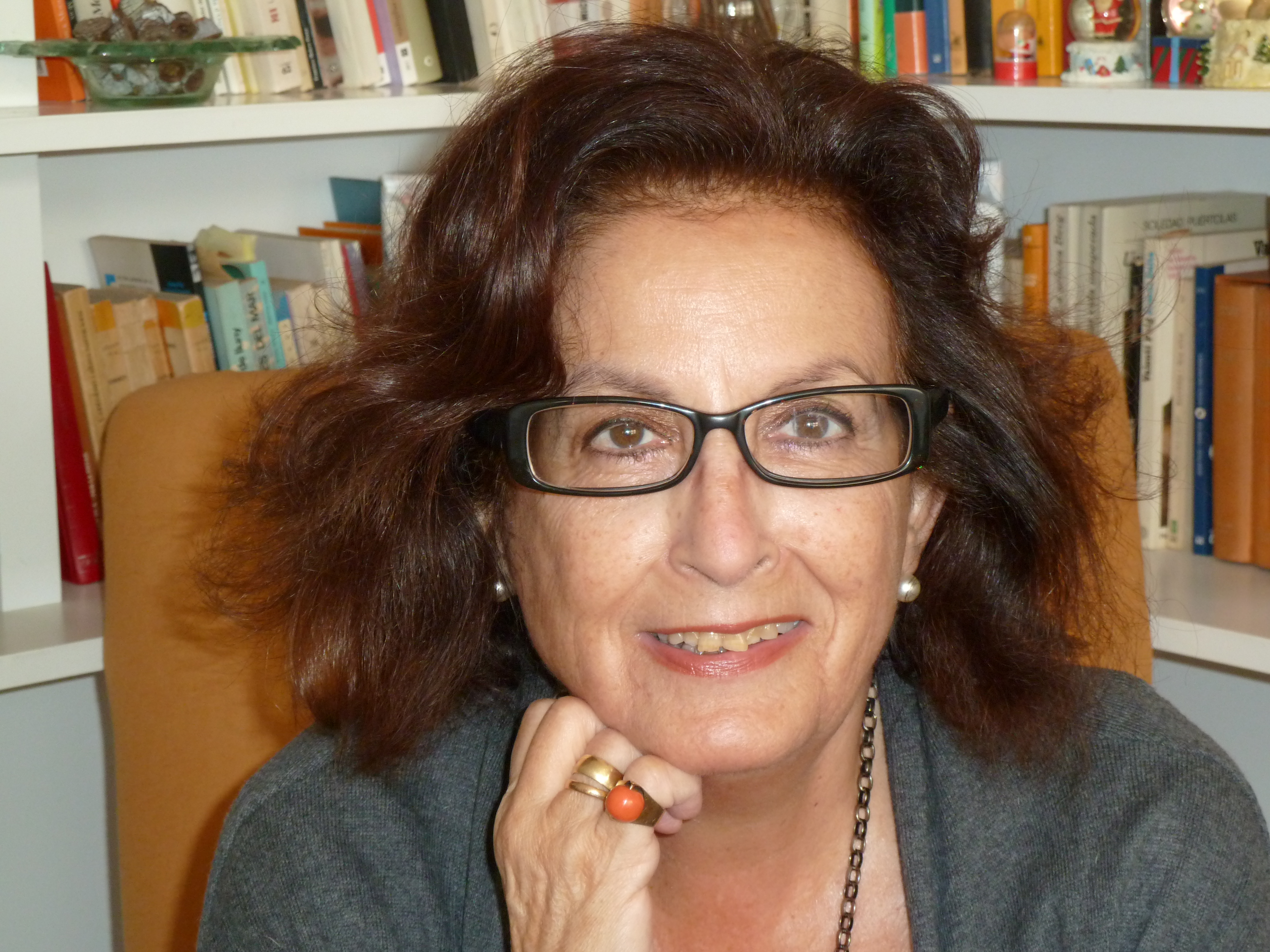
- Born: Mercè Foradada; January 16, 1947 (age 79); Vilanova i la Geltrú, Barcelona, Spain
- Occupations: Teacher, writer
- Writing career
- Language: Catalan
- Genre: Novel
- Notable work: En el prestatge
- Website: merceforadada.blogspot.ch

Mercè Foradada (Vilanova i la Geltrú, Barcelona; January 16, 1947) is a Spanish writer who was a teacher of the Catalan language. In her creative corpus, the main characters are mostly women.

Her first published work was En el prestatge and was released in 2002, after winning the 2001 Don.na award. This first work, as the author recognized, has some autobiographical characteristics and approaches the figure of a woman who has to face a change in his life after overcoming 50 years. Later, in 2003, she published the narrative work Velles, amb V de vida with Edicions 62 and delves into the memories of the life of ten old woman.

Foradada published Bruixes with Cossetània Edicions in 2011 and was awarded with 23rd Juan Sebastian Arbó award by the city of Sant Carles de la Ràpita. The book is a plea for freedom of spirit. The argument is based on the witch-hunts of the seventeenth century and the lost children of Francoism, and the story is told through two female characters: Segimona, a healer from centuries ago and Pilar, a lawyer in the present times.

== Published work ==
Novel

- 2002: En el prestatge. Barcelona: Ed. 62
- 2011: Bruixes. Valls: Cossetània Ed.
- 2011: Centaures. Valls: Cossetània Ed.

Narrative

- 2003: Velles amb V de vida. Barcelona: Edicions 62

Research and dissemination

- 2010: Vilanovines; De l'arxiu a l'evocació. Valls: Cossetània.
