= Eutrapelia =

Ability of a person to have pleasant conversation

Eutrapelia comes from the Greek for "wittiness" (Ancient Greek: εὐτραπελία, romanized: eutrapelia) and refers to pleasantness in conversation, with ease and a good sense of humor. It is one of Aristotle's virtues, being the "golden mean" between boorishness (ἀγροικία) and buffoonery (βωμολοχία).

Construed narrowly, eutrapelia is associated with an emotion in the same manner modesty and righteousness are associated with emotion; while it is not tied to any particular emotion when construed in wider terms, and is classified with truthfulness, friendliness, and dignity in the category of mean-dispositions that cannot be called pathetikai mesotetes.

In Ephesians 5:4, Paul the Apostle uses the word εὐτραπελία with a negative meaning, referring to dirty jokes which do not befit Christians. John Chrysostom follows him in strongly criticizing inappropriate witticism, warning "that the greatest evils are both produced and increased by it, and that it oftentimes terminates in fornication".

Thomas Aquinas (1225–1274), viewed eutrapelia in a positive light, again, favoring the ancient Aristotelian notion that it is constituted by mental relaxation and honorable fun. In the Summa Theologica, Aquinas made it the virtue of moderation in relation to jesting.

By the second half of the thirteenth century, the concept was considered a state of judicious pleasure and returned to being considered a virtue by commentators.

The term eutrapely is derived from eutrapelia and, since 1596, shares the original meaning of wittiness in conversations.
