= D. Sam Abrams =

American poet, translator, and critic (b. 1952)

Sam Abrams (2007)

D. Sam Abrams (born 1952) is a poet, translator and critic. He is considered an authority on the Catalan language. He holds a degree in Hispanic Studies from the Autonomous University of Barcelona. Abrams currently teaches contemporary Catalan poetry and literary theory at the Open Universitat of Catalunya.

== Bibliography ==
=== Poetry ===
- Calculations... (1997)
- Tot el desig a peu de plana (Into footnotes all their lust) (2002)

=== Edited books ===
- Poesia anglesa i nord-americana (1994)
- Veure és sentir: Àlbum Ràfols-Casamada (1994)
- Dietaris de Marià Manent (2000)
- Tomàs Garcés (2001)

=== Edited anthologies ===
- Tenebra blanca: antologia del poema en prosa en la literatura catalana contemporània (2001)
- Jo no sóc ningu. Qui ets tu? (2002), an anthology of poems of Emily Dickinson
- T’estimo: Més de cent poemes d’amor i desig (2002)
- La mirada estrangera (2005), a collection of foreign perspectives on Catalonia
- Sagrada Emilia (2005), poetic versions of Gertrude Stein
- Gebre i sol, an anthology of poems by Robert Frost
