= Mercês =

Mercês can refer to:

- Mercês (Minas Gerais), a place in Brazil
- Mercês (Lisbon), a place in Portugal
- Merces (Goa), a locality besides Panaji, Tiswadi in Goa, India
- Merces (Vasai), a locality besides Mumbai(Bombay), Thane in Maharashtra, India
