= Convivència =

Public policy in Catalonia, Spain

Convivència is the public policy on social coexistence in Catalonia, Spain; government projects, departments and ordinances promote the principle broadly. Originally, convivència was presented as a policy to integrate immigrant populations and build social cohesion following the divisive Spanish Civil War and dictatorship. Today, convivència can encompass conflict mediation, policing, civic participation, language policy, public education, civility, public celebrations and the promotion of neighborhood-based initiatives. As the dominant paradigm of social coexistence, convivència is the frequent subject of political, scholarly, media and popular discourse. Unlike the cognate Castilian term, convivencia, which refers to an imagined Medieval Iberian past, the Catalan word and policy emerged in the late 1970s and refers to contemporary social life and recent history.

== Origin and development of Convivència ==
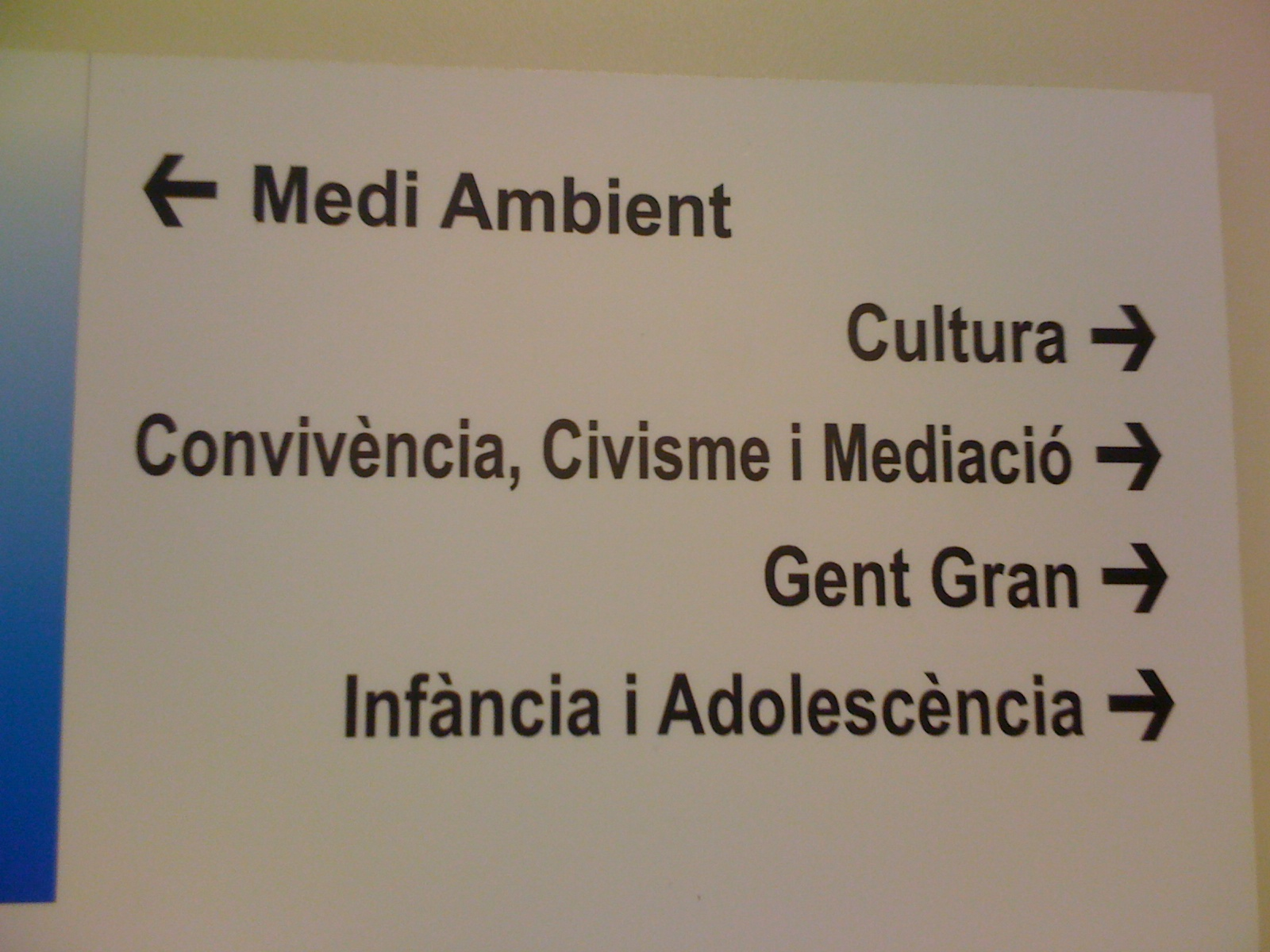
Many Catalan municipal governments include social service divisions dedicated to fostering convivència.

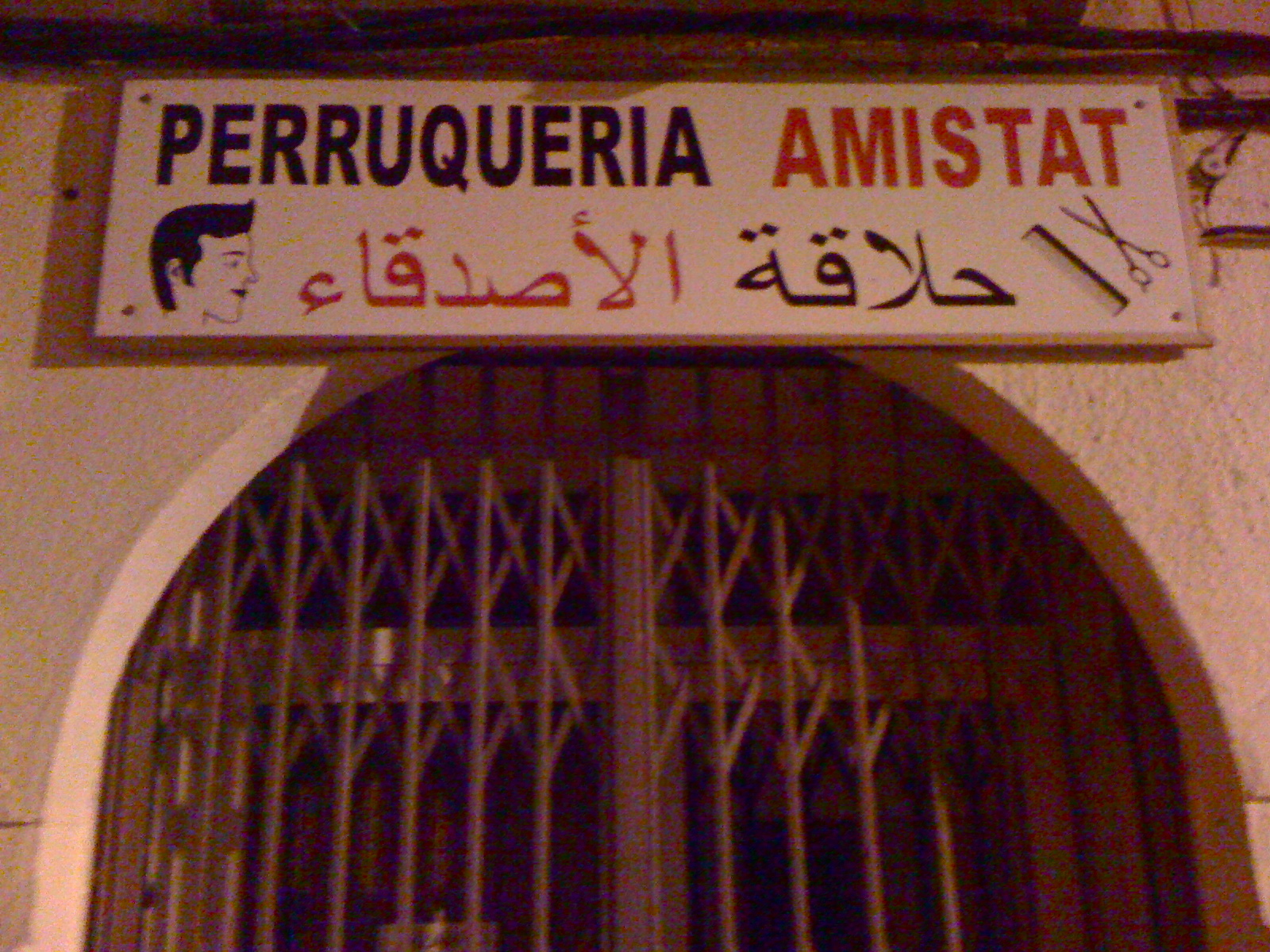
This Muslim barber has named his shop with the Catalan word for "Friendship." This may express the Islamic value of neighborliness, often linked to convivència by Muslims in Catalonia.

Convivència (literally "to live together") is a Catalan term, distinct from the Castilian term, convivencia, the latter primarily referring to the historical and disputed coexistence of Jews, Muslims and Christians in Medieval Iberia. It was first popularized in reference to contemporary phenomena by former Catalan President Jordi Pujol, in the early years of the return to democracy following the dictatorship of Francisco Franco (1939–75). As Pujol employed the term, convivència signified tolerance and linguistic accommodation between native born Catalans and the Castilian-speaking "new Catalans" or "other Catalans" who had migrated from Southern Spain in such numbers as to constitute roughly half of the population of Catalonia. In subsequent decades, the term became the dominant frame of shared social existence in Catalonia and no longer carried a passive sense of mere tolerance but rather the active engagement of relations between neighbors and of the full expression of cultural pluralism in which there is public space for all traditions Convivència overlaps semantically with the concept of civility (civisme) to the extent that both may refer to mutual respect in the shared use of public space yet there is an important distinction. Civisme is often understood as a top-down, legislative imposition of universal norms over the population whereas convivència (while also sometimes being legislated) is perceived as a bottom-up, neighbor-to-neighbor process whereby residents work out solutions to conflicts among themselves. This sense of conflict as productive is an important feature of convivència. A municipal plan defines it this way:

"We can define convivència in the broadest sense of the concept, to live in the company of others with whom we interact with empathy, sharing, communication, and the regulation of conflict. One should bear in mind that when people live together, conflicts arise: this need not be seen as a problem but rather as an impetus to change. From this definition we understand convivència (active relations between neighbors), in contradistinction to coexistence (minimal, passively produced relations between neighbors), and to hostility."

== Convivència vs multiculturalism: implications for citizenship ==
In other parts of Europe, or in the US, the mixed societies that result from immigration are often discussed in terms of multiculturalism. The term multiculturalism is predicated on the existence of distinct, sometimes static cultural identities and often provoke debate regarding the conception of human rights as universal or particular to a cultural group. The rights of these cultural others often hinge on the question of their citizenship. While equivalents for all of these concepts exist in Catalonia, they are not the dominant nor even the legally significant ideas. Catalan law does not acknowledge citizens but rather neighbors (veïns) through the principle of veïnatge administratiu (neighborhood jurisdiction) established by municipal registration (l'empadronament) regardless of citizenship. Citizenship is an abstract concept; one may be a citizen of one place yet reside in another but a person can only be a neighbor in one determinant place at a time. Both concepts convivència and neighbor emphasize concrete local specificity over disembodied abstraction. And while convivència encompasses the relations between natives and newcomers, it also concerns the relations between people of shared origins, therefore de-emphasizing cultural differences. Following these principles, in most Catalan communities, the preferred term for immigrant is "nouvingut" (newcomer) suggesting the language of hospitality rather than that of social or legal policy. It should be understood that these differences do not guarantee better or different social outcomes for immigrants but rather that these concepts form part of the way Catalans understand their own society in distinct ways.

== Convivència and Islam ==
Half of Spain's Muslim population resides in Catalonia providing challenges and opportunities for the application of convivència. Catalonia's Muslim leaders, from the imams of local mosques, to Catalonia's first Muslim member of parliament who has published a trilingual book on the subject, have framed convivència as consonant with Qu'ranic teachings, or as part of Islamic tradition itself. While tensions between Muslims and non-Muslim communities exist in Catalonia as elsewhere, convivència supplies a common frame of shared values as a starting point for dialogue. This is in stark contrast to other parts of Europe where such conflicts may be framed as the "clash of civilizations," or the alleged fundamental incompatibility between Islam and secular modernity.
