= María Salvo Iborra =

Spanish anti-Francoist activist (1920–2020

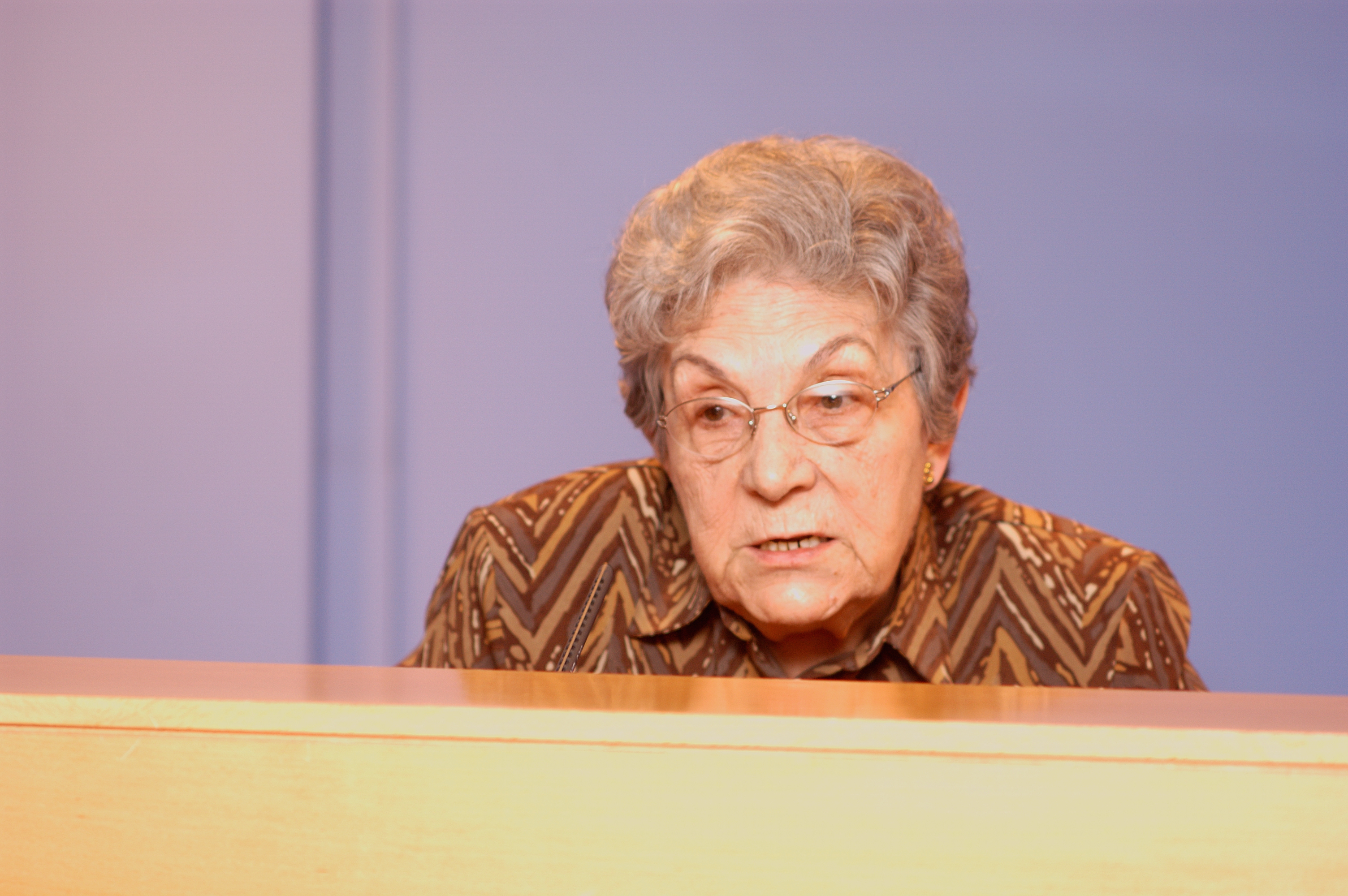
- Born: 27 May 1920; Sabadell, Spain
- Died: 16 November 2020 (aged 100); Barcelona, Spain
- Citizenship: Spanish
- Organization(s): Juventudes Socialistas Unificadas de Cataluña (JSUC); Unified Socialist Party of Catalonia (PSUC); Associació Catalana d'Expresos Polítics del Franquisme; Les Dones del 36
- Known for: Anti-Francoist activism Political prisoner Historical memory advocate
- Awards: Creu de Sant Jordi (2005); Medal of Honor of Barcelona (2003); Doctora Honoris Causa, Polytechnic University of Catalonia (2004)

María Salvo Iborra (27 May 1920 - 16 November 2020) was a Spanish anti-Francoist activist and a prominent figure in the recovery of historical memory in Catalonia. She spent sixteen years as a political prisoner under the Franco dictatorship, and later became a key voice for women who suffered repression. Salvo was a co-founder of the association Les Dones del 36 and president of the Associació Catalana d'Expresos Polítics del Franquisme.

== Biography ==
=== Early life and activism ===
María Salvo Iborra was born in Sabadell, Catalonia, on 27 May 1920, into a working-class family. Her father was a cabinetmaker involved in workers' movements, and her mother was a practicing Catholic, illiterate but keen on her children's education. The family moved to Barcelona, where María began working as a porter at age 13 in the Les Corts neighborhood, later as a seamstress and presser. In 1935, she frequented cultural centers of Esquerra Republicana de Catalunya and joined the Juventudes Socialistas Unificadas de Cataluña (JSUC). With the outbreak of the Spanish Civil War in 1936, she affiliated with the Unión General de Trabajadores (UGT) and worked in a collectivized clothing workshop. In 1938, she became the Secretary of Propaganda for the Barcelona Committee of the JSUC. Following the fall of Catalonia to Francoist forces in January 1939, Salvo went into exile in France. She was interned in several concentration camps, including Le Pouliguen and Moisdon-la-Rivière. In November 1939, French authorities handed her over to the Guardia Civil in Bilbao.

=== Imprisonment ===
After returning to Spain, Salvo resumed clandestine activities with the Unified Socialist Party of Catalonia (PSUC). On 26 September 1941 (some sources state 9 September), she was arrested in Madrid along with other women for "conspiracy against the internal security of the State." She was 21 years old. She endured thirty days of torture in the Dirección General de Seguridad (DGS) in Madrid, which, among other consequences, left her unable to have children. Initially, Salvo and her companions were transferred to the Ventas prison in Madrid and then to the Les Corts prison in Barcelona. In Les Corts, she spent nine months incommunicado. The conditions were dire, with severe overcrowding and poor hygiene.

In 1943, she was moved from Les Corts to the Predicadores prison in Zaragoza, and then back to Ventas in Madrid. On 15 December 1944, a military tribunal (Council of War) sentenced her to thirty years of reclusion for "attentat against the security of the State," of which she served sixteen. During her imprisonment, she was also held in prisons in Segovia and Alcalá de Henares. A significant hardship during her early imprisonment was a false accusation from within the Communist Party of Spain (PCE) that she had collaborated with the Francoist police, leading to the arrest of PCE leaders (the "Lisbon Group"). This accusation, published in Mundo Obrero in 1943, caused her profound pain and isolation from fellow communist prisoners for several years. The accusation was later proven false, notably by the very sentence documents from her trial, which detailed the collaboration of others.

=== Post-release and continued militancy ===
Salvo was released from prison in 1957, with the express prohibition of returning to Barcelona or its province. She was banished to Santander. Despite this, she clandestinely returned to Barcelona and continued her political militancy with the PSUC and the feminist movement. She later met and shared her life with Domènec Serra, a fellow anti-Francoist resister. With the arrival of democracy, Salvo became a prominent advocate for historical memory. She was president of the Associació Catalana d'Expresos Polítics del Franquisme (ACEPF). In 1997, alongside Josefina Piquet and other survivors of the Civil War and Francoist repression, she co-founded the association Les Dones del 36. The association aimed to make known the experiences of women during that period and received the Maria Aurèlia Capmany Prize from the Barcelona City Council the same year. She actively campaigned for a monument in memory of the Les Corts women's prison.

=== Death ===
María Salvo Iborra died in Barcelona on 16 November 2020, at the age of 100.

== Recognitions and legacy ==
Salvo received several recognitions for her lifelong struggle for justice and democratic freedoms:

- Medal of Honor of Barcelona (2003)
- Invested as Doctora Honoris Causa by the Polytechnic University of Catalonia (2004)
- Awarded the Creu de Sant Jordi (Cross of Saint George) by the Generalitat de Catalunya (2005)

In 2019, at the age of 99, she symbolically occupied the 41st position on Ada Colau's electoral list for Barcelona en Comú in the municipal elections. Ada Colau described her as a "free, strong, lucid, and generous woman." María Salvo dedicated her later years to ensuring that the sacrifices of her generation were not forgotten, frequently speaking to younger generations.

Her life and experiences are the subject of historian Ricard Vinyes's book El daño y la memoria: Les presons de Maria Salvo published in 2004.
