= Joan Salvat-Papasseit =

Spanish poet (1894–1924)

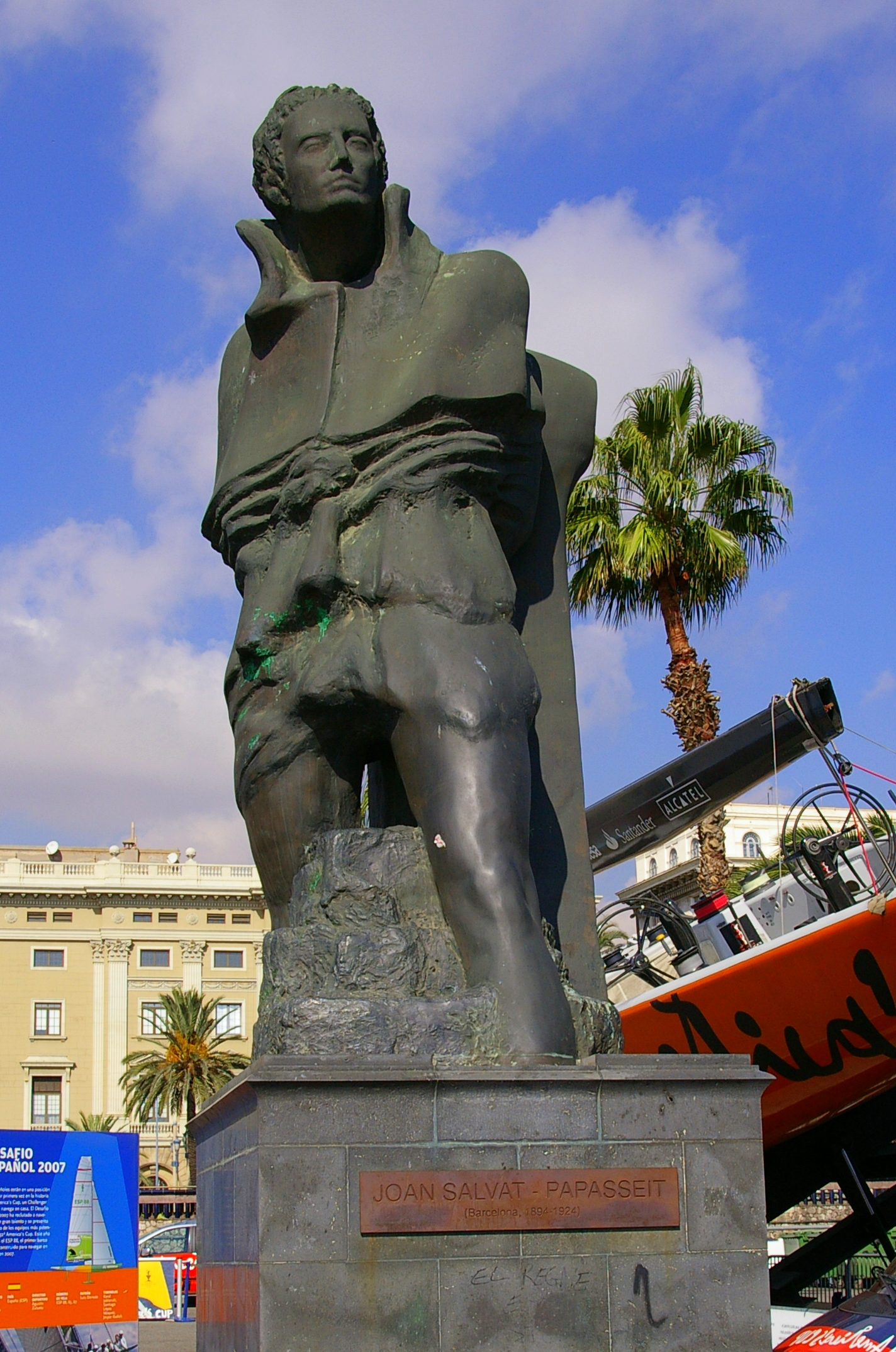
- Sculpture at the Barcelona seafront
- Born: 16 May 1894; Barcelona, Catalonia, Spain
- Died: 7 August 1924 (aged 30); Barcelona, Catalonia, Spain
- Resting place: Cemetery of Montjuïc
- Occupation: Poet,
- Writing career
- Literary movement: Surrealism, Futurism

Joan Salvat-Papasseit (Catalan pronunciation: [ʒuˈan səlˈβat pəpəˈsɛjt]; Barcelona, 16 May 1894 – 7 August 1924) was a Catalan poet, though he also wrote articles, manifestos and other prose of a political and social nature. He wrote primarily in Catalan, although he had an early period of essay-writing in Spanish.

His work is notable for its nonconformity, idealism and foreboding of premature death. His poetry, with both avant-garde and traditional influences, begins with the publication of Poemes en ondes hertzianes (Poems in Hertzian Waves) in 1919. The cover illustration for the book was created by Joaquín Torres García. Further works of poetry were "La gesta dels estels" (The Exploit of the Stars) in 1922 and the culmination of the poet's vital enthusiasm in "El poema de la rosa als llavis" (Poem of the Rose in the Lips) in 1923.

The city of Barcelona has honored him with a statue at the Moll de la Fusta wharf by Robert Krier (Luxembourg, 1938), the pedestal of which bears a plaque with his poem, "Nocturn per a acordió", referring to the period when the poet was a night watchman there. His poetry has been brought to the public at large, in particular through musical arrangements and recitals by Lluís Llach, Ovidi Montllor, Guillermina Motta, Ramon Muntaner, Xavier Ribalta, Joan Manuel Serrat and Rafel Subirachs, amongst others, as well as Carles Andreu in France.

== Works ==
=== Poetry ===
- Poemes en ondes hertzianes (Poems in Hertzian Waves, 1919)
- L'irradiador del Port i les gavines (The Port Irradiator and the Seagulls, aka The Port Beacon and the Seagulls, 1921)
- Les conspiracions (The Conspiracies, 1922)
- La gesta dels estels (The Exploit of the Stars, 1922)
- El poema de la rosa als llavis (Poem of the Rose in the Lips, 1923)
- Óssa Menor (Ursa Minor, 1925, published posthumously)

=== Essays, articles ===
- Glosas de un socialista (1916)
- Humo de fábrica (1918)
- Mots propis, a series of philosophical essays inspired by Nietzsche and Torres Garcia, published in the literary magazine, Un Enemic del Poble (1917–1919)
- La ploma d'Aristarc, unpublished

=== Manifestos or programmatic texts ===
- Sóc jo que parlo als joves (1919)
- Concepte de poeta (1919)
- Contra els poetes amb minúscula: primer manifest català futurista (1920)

=== Literary magazines he founded or co-founded ===
- Un Enemic del Poble (1917–1919)
- Arc-Voltaïc (1918)
- Proa (1921)
