= Atlantic Center of Modern Art =

Modern art gallery in Las Palmas de Gran Canaria

Atlantic Center for Modern Art
- Centro Atlántico de Arte Moderno
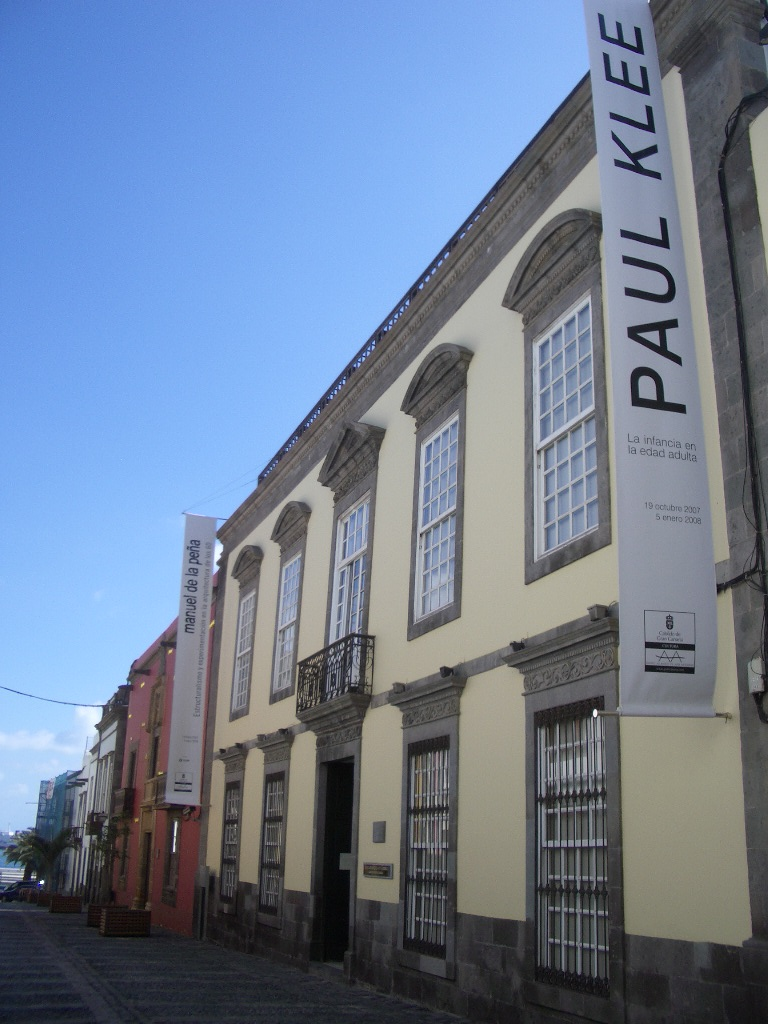
- The CAAM building in Vegueta

- Location within Canary Islands
- Established: 1989; 37 years ago
- Location: Las Palmas; Gran Canaria; Spain
- Coordinates: 28.10097°N 15.413472°W
- Website: www.caam.net

The Atlantic Center for Modern Art (Spanish: Centro Atlántico de Arte Moderno) (CAAM) is a contemporary art museum in the Canary Islands, Spain. It is in Vegueta in Las Palmas, the capital city of Gran Canaria.

The building was designed by the architect Francisco Javier Sáenz de Oiza, retaining the façade of two older neoclassical houses. It was opened on 4 December 1989, initially to house the collections of Canarian art of the island council, the Cabildo Insular de Gran Canaria.

== Collection ==
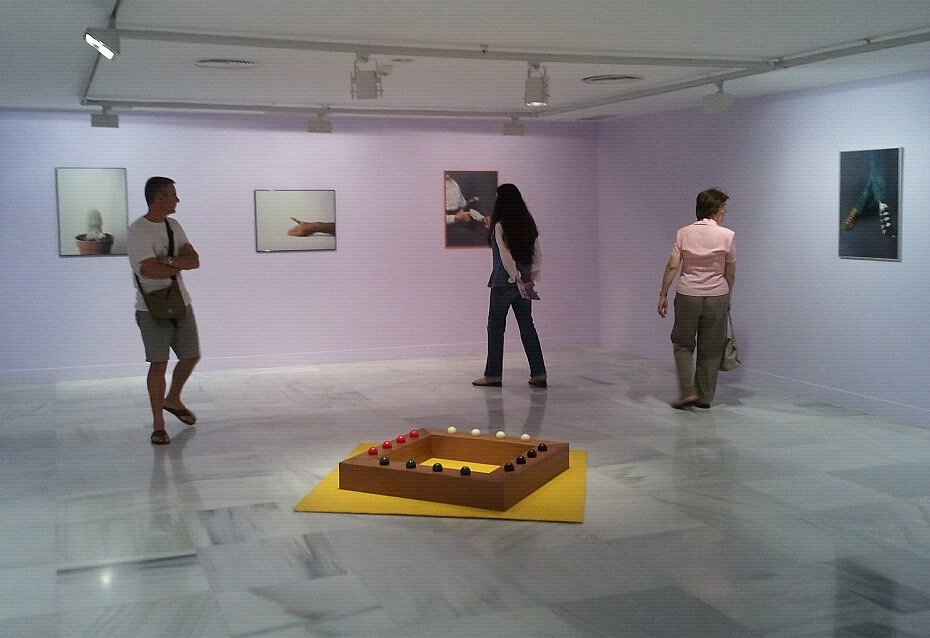
Visitors at a CAAM exhibition of works by Ron Gorchov Juan Hidalgo in 2011

CAAM has a permanent collection of over 2600 works, many of them from the Americas, Africa and Europe, reflecting the influence of the culture of three continents on the Canarian archipelago. The museum promotes this theme of "tricontinentality" - the dialogue between the European, African and American continents - as an approach for appreciating Canarian works of art.

It has a noted collection of Canarian art, particularly works by artists from the Grupo El Paso and the Informalist movement such as Manolo Millares, Martín Chirino, and Pablo Serrano. Works from the 1980s and 1990s by Spanish artists such as José María Sicilia, Cristina Iglesias and Luis Gordillo also feature in the collection, along with works by Andreas Schulze and Jiri Georg Dokoupil.

CAAM is a popular visitor attraction in Las Palmas.
