= Monirul Islam (artist) =

Bangladeshi painter

- মনিরুল ইসলাম
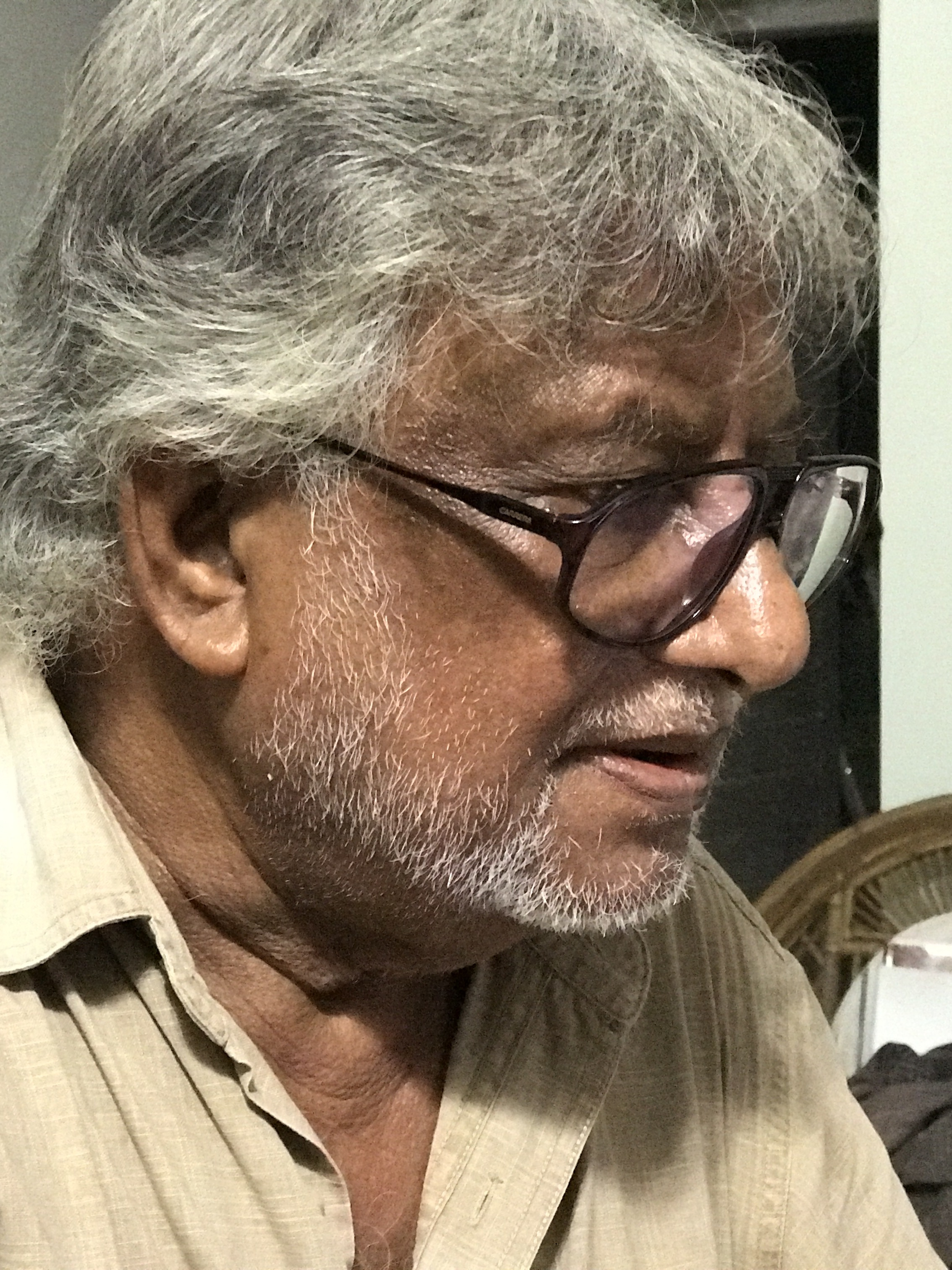
- Islam in 2017
- Born: 17 August 1943 (age 83); Chandpur, Bengal Presidency, British India
- Education: University of Dhaka; Royal Academy of Fine Arts of San Fernando, Madrid

Monirul Islam (also known as Monir, born 17 August 1943) is a Bangladeshi-Spanish artist. Monir is an International figure in etching for his signature style and experimental techniques. For his great accomplishment in art, he received two of Spain's top civilian honors: the Cross of Officer of the Order of Queen Isabella (2010), and the Commander Spanish Order of Merit (2018), and Bangladesh Government's civilian award Ekushey Padak in 1999.

== Education and career ==
Monir was born in Chandpur, Bengal Presidency of British India, present-day Bangladesh. He studied at the Faculty of Fine Arts of the University of Dhaka during 1966-1969 when Zainul Abedin and Mustafa Monwar were his teachers and mentors. He also taught there as a faculty member for one year. With a scholarship from the Ministry of Foreign Affairs of Spain, he graduated in mural paintings from the Escuela de Bellas Artes de San Fernando. After graduation, he remained permanently resident in Spain.

Etching allowed him his first success in Spain in the early seventies when he was included in the short-lived Grupo Quince, which gave him a platform to be in touch with the vanguards of the technique; he worked alongside artists such as Antonio Saura, José Guerrero, Amadeo Gabino, Lucio Muńoz, Alfonso Fraile, Niels Borch Jensen, Carmen Laffón, Antoni Tàpies Juan Romero, Miguel Ángel Campano, Rafael Canogar, Fernando Zóbel, and Luis Gordillo. By this time he was also directing the workshop of Antonio Lorenzo with whom he keeps a life-long great friendship. In the Spanish art world, the result of his "free-bite" technique of etching is known as "Escuela de Monir" (School of Monir).

The works of Monirul Islam are known for the balance of the empty space and delicate lines, texture and forms that transcendent and transform the versatility and diversity of life. He has developed his style through continuous experimentation of techniques, with clear growth from his early works to his most recent work.

Although Monir is fully integrated with the Spanish artistic movement, he does not leave his Bangladeshi roots. Through his works - etchings, paintings, monotypes, or watercolor - speaks in a language that has been created with rhythms of colors, graphics, and alludes forms and his wisdom, spiritual sensibility and technical skills.

== Documentary on Monirul Islam ==
In 2008, a documentary film entitled "Phera/ফেরা" (The Homecoming), on the life and work of Monirul Islam, was directed and scripted by Fahmida Akhter. It was produced by the Bengal Foundation.

== Awards and honors ==
- Commander Spanish Order of Merit (2018)
- Cross of Officer of the Order of Queen Isabella (2010)
- National Award of Spain, Calcografia Nocionale (1997)
- Ekushey Padak (1999)
- Bangla Academy Fellowship (2018)
- Zainul Sammanona (2018)
- S.M. Sultan Padak (2012)
