= Eva Lootz =

Austrian–Spanish plastic artist and sculptor (born 1940)

Eva Lootz (born 1940, in Vienna) is an Austrian–Spanish artist and sculptor, best known for her sculptures and art work using plastics, and her plastic art public installations across Spain. She won the National Award for Plastic Arts in 1994, and her works are in the collections of the Palacio de Cristal del Retiro, the Museo Nacional Centro de Arte Reina Sofía, the Barcelona Museum of Contemporary Art, the Museo de Arte Abstracto Español, the Artium Museum, the Museo de Historia de Madrid, the Centro Galego de Arte Contemporánea, and the Atlantic Center of Modern Art.
