= Miguel Ángel Campano =

Spanish painter

Miguel ÁNgel Campano
- Born: Miguel Ángel Campano Mendaza; February 11, 1948; Madrid, Spain
- Died: August 5, 2018 (aged 70); Cercedilla, Spain
- Education: San Carlos School of Fine Arts, Valencia, Spain
- Known for: Painting
- Awards: National Award for Plastic Arts (1996)

Miguel Ángel Campano Mendaza (February 11, 1948 – August 5, 2018) was a Spanish painter who was critically acclaimed as part of the "generation of the renewal of Spanish painting", receiving, among other prizes, he received the National Award for Plastic Arts in 1996.

== Biography ==
Born in Madrid, he was the third of five brother, son of General Ángel Campano López. He studied Fine Arts in Valencia and Architecture in Madrid. He began his artistic career in 1969, making his first individual exhibition in Bilbao. In 1971 he exhibited in different Spanish towns – Pamplona, Santander and Valencia – and that same year he met the abstract painter Fernando Zóbel, one of the promoters of the so-called Cuenca Group and founder of the Spanish Museum of Abstract Art. He continued to exhibit in Madrid and Seville and befriended the painter José Guerrero, who is said to be a fundamental influence in Campano. In 1976 he moved to Paris, a city that became, together with Sóller in Mallorca, the artist's habitual residence. His stay in France allowed him to get to know the work of painters who have inspired his work at different times, such as Cezanne and Delacroix, among many others. In the 1980s he participated in the great collective exhibitions of the time of young Spanish artists – Miquel Barceló, José Manuel Broto, and José María Sicilia – in Spain, France and the United States, as well as in individual exhibitions throughout Spain – from Navarre to Granada – France – Nimes and Paris – and in Brussels (Belgium).

The whole of his work has been considered a place of experimentation and transgression. It has been linked to automatism in its beginnings, to geometric abstraction and informalism. The reinterpretation in several series of French paintings by Cezanne and Poussin, among others, as well as cubism, stands out from his production. His stay in 1994, 1995 and 1996 in India resulted in an innovative interest in colour in his later work 11 and he has continued to work despite having suffered a serious stroke and subsequent health complications in 1996. (Note: Miguel Angel Campano suffered a stroke in 1996. He then suffered from several falls until he had to remain in a wheelchair with a high degree of disability, which "inevitably marks a before and after in his life".) The two most outstanding exhibitions of his work have been those held in Valencia by the IVAM at the Centre del Carmen in 1990-1991 and the one held at the Palacio de Velázquez in Madrid between June and September 1999.

In 1996, he was awarded the National Prize for Visual Arts in Spain for "his decisive contribution to the debate on the new Spanish painting" and the "rigor and courage with which he has developed a work in which he combines construction and expressiveness in an exemplary manner". Campano works can be found in museums such as the Reina Sofía Museum in Madrid, the Abstract Art Museum in Cuenca, the Bilbao Fine Arts Museum, the ARTIUM Centre-Basque Museum of Contemporary Art, the Valencian Institute of Modern Art, the Georges Pompidou Centre in Paris and the Hastings Foundation collection in New York.

Campano died on August 5, 2018, in Cercedilla.

== Bibliography ==
- Zamora Meca, Clara (2013). "Epistolario de Miguel Ángel Campano" (PDF). Laboratorio de Arte. 2 (25). Sevilla: Universidad de Sevilla: Departamento de Historia del Arte: 955–964. ISSN 1130-5762.
