= José Manuel Broto Gimeno =

Spanish painter (born 1949)

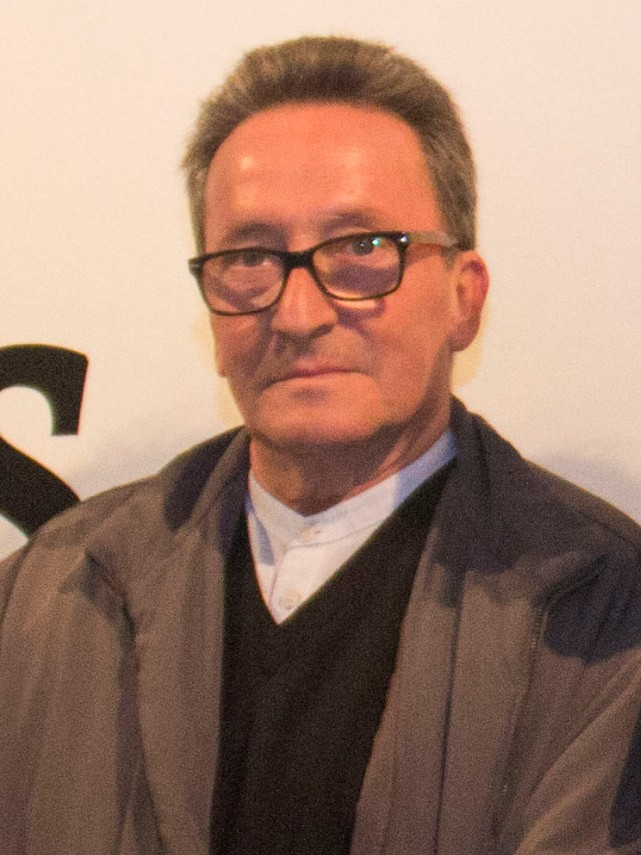
Broto in 2016.

José Manuel Broto Gimeno (born 1949 in Zaragoza) is a Spanish painter.

== Biography ==
He studied at the Escuela de Artes y Oficios de Zaragoza (School of Arts and Crafts in Zaragoza), and first exhibited in 1969. In 1972 he went to live in Barcelona where he formed the Trama Group with Grau, Rubio, and Tena. In 1985 he transferred his residence to Paris. After ten years in Paris where he met other Spanish artists such as Miquel Barceló, Miguel Angel Campano and José María Sicilia, he moved to Mallorca. He has showcased his works in major cities around the world, from Helsinki to New York City and in major galleries in cities across Spain. He has been awarded with the Premio Nacional de Artes Plásticas de España (National Prize of Plastic Arts of Spain) in 1995, the Premio ARCO de la Asociación de Críticos (ARC Award Critics Association Award) in 1997 and the Premio Aragón Goya de Grabado in 2003.

== Style ==
His paintings are typically intellectual, thoughtful and very calculated in their apparent spontaneity, and reminiscent of Analytic Cubism. He often uses blue or yellow and red on black, and his brushwork is typically broad and uneven, often contrasting the blurry and the clear. His pictorial works are said to have a "strong chromatic component that combines the geometric shapes with dribbled paint."
