= Campano =

Campano is a surname. Notable people with the surname include:

- Alejandro Campano (born 1978), Spanish footballer
- Carlos Campano (born 1985), Spanish motorcycle racer
- Giovanni Campano (c. 1220–1296), one of the referents used for Campanus of Novara, Italian mathematician and astrologer
- Giovanni Antonio Campano (1429–1477), Italian humanist bishop
- Miguel Ángel Campano (1948–2018), Spanish painter
