= Soledad Sevilla =

Spanish painter (born 1944)

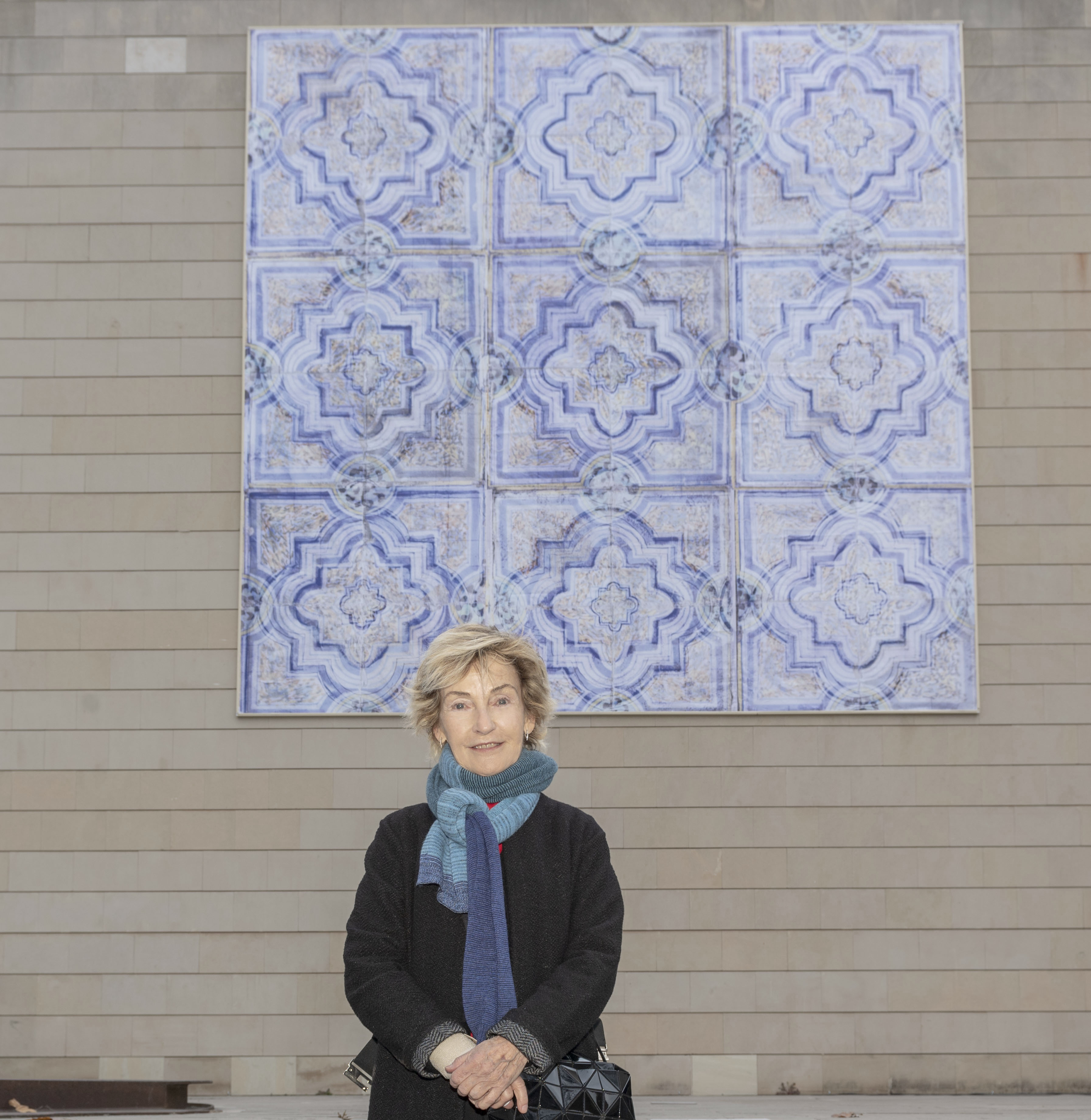
- Born: Soledad Sevilla Portillo; 1944 (age 80–81); Valencia, Spain
- Education: Reial Acadèmia Catalana de Belles Arts de Sant Jordi, Complutense University of Madrid
- Occupation(s): Painter, installation artist
- Awards: National Award for Plastic Arts (1993)
- Website: www.soledadsevilla.com

Soledad Sevilla Portillo (born 1944) is a Spanish painter, and installation artist; known for large-format paintings, featuring geometric abstraction and spatial installations. She lives in Granada, Spain.

== Early life and education ==
Soledad Sevilla Portillo was born on 1944, in Valencia, Spain. She studied at the Reial Acadèmia Catalana de Belles Arts de Sant Jordi from 1960 to 1965, and continued her studies at the Computing Center of the Complutense University of Madrid from 1969 to 1971.

== Career ==
At the end of the 1960s she began her painting career, focused on abstract and geometric work. In the early 1980s she incorporated installations into her work. She was awarded the National Award for Plastic Arts in 1993.

The Institut Valencià d'Art Modern in Valencia held a solo exhibition of her work in 2001. The Museo Nacional Centro de Arte Reina Sofía in Madrid held a solo retrospective exhibition of her work in 2024, Rhythms, Plots, Variables (Spanish: Ritmos, tramas y variables).

Her work is in museum collections, including at the Barcelona Museum of Contemporary Art; and Museu d'Art Jaume Morera in Lleida, Catalonia.
