= Blood Orange Summer Glut =

Sculpture by Robert Rauschenberg

- Artist: Robert Rauschenberg
- Year: 1987

Blood Orange Summer Glut is a sculpture made of junk metal by the American artist Robert Rauschenberg in 1987. Belonging to the Glut series, it is part of the Institut Valencià d'Art Modern collection. It is widely recognized as one of the best pieces in this museum's collection, being exhibited in exhibitions at centers such as MAXXI in Rome, or MACA in Alicante.

The work was donated to the museum in 2005, after receiving the Julio González Award in 2004. It is part of the Glut series, started in 1986 and inspired by the junk Rauschenberg found in several cities in Texas. This work is made of scrap metal and a truck toy, in a composition similar to a falling plane, and it is painted in orange as a reminder of the Texan summer.
