= ZAJ =

ZAJ, Zaj, or zaj could refer to:

- Zaranj Airport, an airport near Zaranj, Afghanistan, by IATA code
- Zaj, an Italian experimental music group from 1959 to 1993
- Zaramo language, a language spoken in Tanzania, by ISO 639 code
