= Juan Hidalgo =

Juan Hidalgo may refer to:

- Juan Hidalgo de Polanco (1614–1685), Spanish composer and harpist
- Juan Hidalgo Codorniu (1927–2018), Spanish composer, poet and artist, member of the ZAJ group
- Juan Hidalgo (athlete) (born 1945), Spanish long-distance runner
