= Carmen Calvo (artist) =

Spanish artist

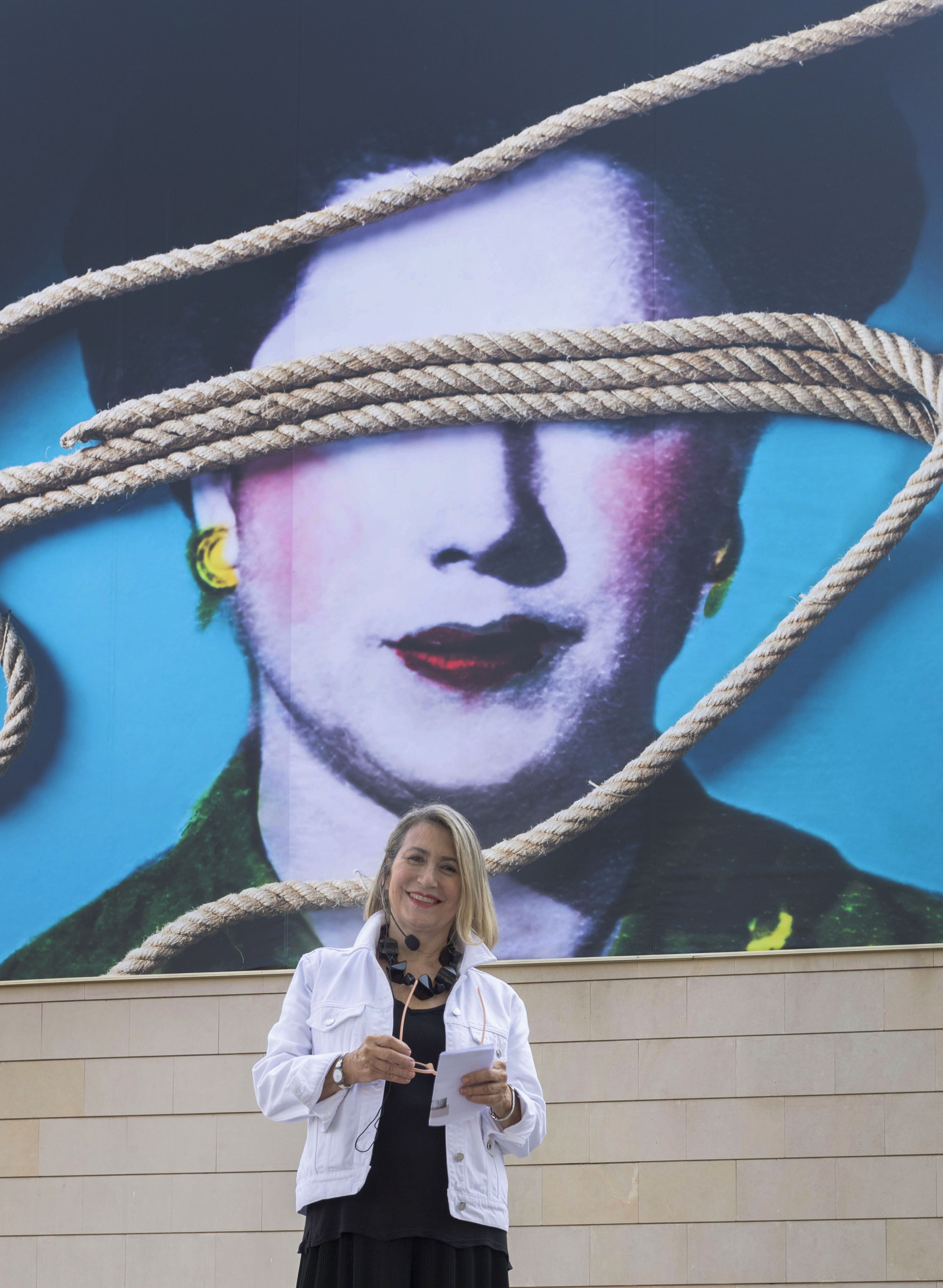
- Calvo at the Institut Valencià d'Art Modern in 2019
- Born: Carmen Calvo Sáenz de Tejada; 1950 (age 75–76); Valencia, Spain
- Education: School of Fine Arts of Valencia
- Occupation: Artist
- Years active: 1973–present
- Organization: Real Academia de Bellas Artes de San Carlos de Valencia
- Awards: National Award for Plastic Arts (2013)
- Website: www.carmencalvo.es

Carmen Calvo Sáenz de Tejada (born 1950) is a Spanish conceptual artist, noted for her contribution to the contemporary art of the Valencian Community.

== Biography ==
Carmen Calvo was born in Valencia in 1950. In her youth she worked in a ceramic factory, an experience which would later be reflected in her art, which includes fragments of pottery and clay. She studied advertising and entered that city's School of Arts and Crafts from 1965 to 1970. She attended the School of Fine Arts of Valencia from 1969 to 1972.

She held her first individual exhibition in Valencia in 1976, and her second in Madrid in 1977.

From 1983 to 1985 she lived in the Casa de Velázquez in Madrid. In 1985 she received a scholarship from the Ministry of Foreign Affairs and moved to Paris, where she remained until 1992. Since then she has lived and worked in Valencia.

== Artistic career ==
An admirer and follower of artists such as Giotto, Piero della Francesca, Filippo De Pisis, Carlo Carrà, Jean Arp, Joan Miró, and Jannis Kounellis, Calvo incorporated terracotta into her plastic compositions very early on so that this element would become an icon of her work. In addition to painting, Calvo is known for carrying out interventions, in some cases on a permanent basis, in public buildings.

In the 1980s she received several scholarships, and won distinctions such as the LaSalle Seiko First Prize for Painting and the Alfons Roig Award from the Provincial Diputation of Valencia. In 1980 she was one of nine artists chosen to participate in the exhibition New images from Spain at the Guggenheim Museum in New York. In 1982 she also exhibited at the first edition of ARCO, the contemporary art fair of Madrid, with the Fernando Vijande Gallery.

In 1990 the Institut Valencià d'Art Modern presented a retrospective on her work since 1973.

In 1995, Calvo created the Lápida-Mural, the result of a competition organized by the Regional Ministry of Public Works of the Valencian Community, for Alboraya-Palmaret Station on metro Line 3, a project by Carlos Meri and Lourdes García Sogo.

In the late 1990s she began to introduce photographic images into her compositions and created scenes based on installations, which synthesized, as Francisco Brines referred to it, her "saved and saving view" on contemporary reality.

She represented Spain with a gallery of mirrors at the Venice Biennale in 1997, together with the Catalan poet Joan Brossa. In 2003 the Museo Reina Sofía dedicated an exhibition about her work. From 2 December 2016 to 29 January 2017, her exhibition Carmen Calvo. Todo procede de la sinrazón (1969–2016) was held at Sala Alcalá 31 in Madrid.

In 2013 she received the National Award for Plastic Arts from Spain's Ministry of Education, Culture, and Sports, and in 2014 she was named an academic of the Real Academia de Bellas Artes de San Carlos de Valencia.

She participated in the Official Section of the 2018 PHotoEspaña Festival with the exhibition Quietud y vertigo.

Feminist themes have been prominent in Calvo's work, and in March 2019, she and fellow artist Carla Fuentes received the Carmen Alborch Award from the Socialist Party of the Valencian Country for their contributions to culture and feminism.

== Awards ==
- LaSalle Seiko First Prize for Painting, Barcelona, 1985
- Alfons Roig Award from the Provincial Diputation of Valencia, 1989
- Medal of the Faculty of Fine Arts of San Carlos de Valencia, 2009
- National Award of the Spanish Association of Art Critics (AECA) and ARCO to the most emblematic work by a living Spanish artist, 2012
- Catalan Association of Art Critics (ACCA) Award, 2013
- National Award for Plastic Arts, 2013
- Carmen Alborch Award, Socialist Party of the Valencian Country, 2019
