= Miquel Navarro =

Spanish painter (1945–2026)

- Born: 29 September 1945; Mislata, Spain
- Died: 1 November 2026 (aged 81)
- Education: San Carlos School of Fine Arts, Valencia
- Occupations: Sculptor; painter
- Notable work: Des del terrar (1985–1986), Casco Urbano (1999)
- Movement: Eclectic

Miquel Navarro (29 September 1945 – 1 November 2026) was a Spanish sculptor, painter and contemporary poet. He has been defined as an eclectic artist with influences from postmodernism, minimalism and avant-garde.

== Life and career ==
Navarro was born in Mislata, Valencia, on 29 September 1945. From 1964 to 1968 he studied painting at the San Carlos School of Fine Arts in Valencia. In 1972 he decided to abandon painting and concentrate on sculpture. However, he continued to paint. He also wrote poetry.

In 1973, Navarro showed his first "Ciutat", one of his main sculptural manifestations. He mainly used fireproof materials along with terracotta and sand. Between 1975 and 1980 he exhibited his main works, such as "Pirámide" or "Els altres 75 anys de pintura valenciana" in many expositions in Valencia (Valencia Architects School) and Madrid (Vandres Gallery and Ponce Gallery).

In 1980, Navarro's sculptures were exhibited at the 21st International Sculpture Conference in Washington, DC and the Institute of Contemporary Art, Los Angeles. Over the next few years, Navarro created "Estructura urbana" (1983), "Des terrar" (1985–1986) and "Minerva Paranoica" (1989), a monumental sculpture. Many of these new sculptures contained iron.

In later years, Navarro exhibited in Bilbao (Galeria Colon XVI 2005) and Valencia (Institut Valencià d'Art Modern (IVAM) in 2009). His sculptures included "Ciudad Roja" (1994), "Casco Urbano" (1999) and "L'Almassil" (2010).

Navarro died on 1 November 2026, at the age of 81.

== His work ==
Navarro borrowed from many styles, ranging from Baroque to Postmodernism and Minimalism. One of his main contributions is the "Ciutat (city)". Navarro said:

"La ciudad es como un cuerpo y tiene discursos de las arterias, el elemento horizontal, en el caso de los elementos verticales están los muros, las torres."(following)"El cuerpo humano no utiliza arterias, venas, fluidos, corazón, centro, casco. Cuando tú defines una ciudad estás definiendo un cuerpo".

Some of Navarro's works are part of the collection of the Solomon R. Guggenheim Museum in New York City.

== Awards ==
- Spanish National Award for Plastic Arts, 1986
- Alfons Roig Award (Valencia's Council), 1987
- C.E.O.E Arts Award, 1990
- National AECA Award, 1995
- Valencians for the 21st century Award, 2001
- Generalitat Valenciana Distinction for the Cultural Merit, 2002
- Plastic Arts Awards" Valencianos del Mundo " (Given by Generalidad Valenciana and el Mundo newspaper)
- International Julio Gonzalez Award, 2008
- Man of the Year, Hortanoticias, 2009
- Academician of the Real Academia de BBAA de San Fernando, 2011

== Street works ==
- Fuente Pública Valencia, 1986
- Torreta (Fuente Publica) Turis (Valencia), 1989
- Fanalet (Farola) Quart de Poblet (Valencia), 1989
- Minerva Paranoica (Escultura) Castellón, 1989
- Ars Longa Vita Brevis (Universidad Autonoma ) Barcelona, 1990
- Torre del Sonido (Escultura Universidad Carlos III) Getafe (Madrid), 1992
- Fraternitat (Escultura) Barcelona, 1992
- Mástiles (Hotel Valencia-Palace) Valencia, 1994
- Boca de Luna (Fuente Pública) Brussels, 1996
- Centinela (Hotel San Roque) Garachico (Tenerife), 1999
- Home Guaita (Escultura) Valencia, 1999
- Saltamontes Libando (Fuente Pública) Castellón, 1999
- Casco Industrial (Escultura) Bilbao, 1999
- Andarin (Escultura) Gijon (Asturias), 2000
- Oteando (Escultura) Torrelavega (Cantabria), 2000
- Vigía (Escultura) Las Palmas de Gran Canaria, 2001
- Cabeza con Luna Menguante Mislata (Valencia), 2002
- La Mirada (Escultura) Vitoria-Gasteiz, 2002
- Palera (Escultura) Málaga, 2003
- Palas Fundición (Escultura) Ceuti (Murcia), 2003
- El Parotet Valencia, 2006
- Conexión (Museo Bellas Artes- Bilbao), 2007
- Mantis (Murcia), 2008
- Válvula con alberca (Expo Zaragoza), 2008

== Sources ==
- Barañano, K. M., & Navarro, M. (1999). Miquel Navarro. Valencia: Consorci de Museus de la Comunitat Valenciana.
- Las Provincias. (n.d.). Retrieved March 9, 2016, from http://www.lasprovincias.es/temas/personajes/miquel-navarro.html
- Miquel Navarro en la colección del IVAM: Institut valencià d'art modern, November 8, 2005 – February 27, 2006. (2005). Valencia: IVAM.
- Navarro, M., & Joos, P. (2005). Miquel Navarro: Exposición. Bilbao: Galeria Colón XVI.
- Miquel Navarro. (n.d.). Retrieved May 19, 2016, from http://www.miquelnavarro.com/ Bibliography
