= Sculpture automatique avec certaines interventions dirigées: Ombre chinoise =

Work by Hans Arp

- Artist: Jean Arp
- Year: 1938
- Location: IVAM, Valencia (Spain)

Sculpture automatique avec certaines interventions dirigées: Ombre chinoise, is a sculpture by Hans Arp. It belongs to the collection of the Institut Valencià d'Art Modern, in València.

Since the 1930s, when the author starts to specialize in the sculptural practice, one of his objectives was to experiment and study the spatial occupation of his works to conquest the volumetry. Once he considered to have achieved a good mastery of the volumes, he started working on this sculpture based on Ombres chinoises. The work belongs to the personal language the author defined in previous years, a representation of nature as an ideal for art through abstract and biomorphic forms, characterized by curves and fluctuating motion in their surfaces. The work also synthesizes two of Arp's lines of research: the plastic metamorphosis of organic bodies and volume expansion in the space.
