= Susana Solano =

Spanish sculptor (born 1946)

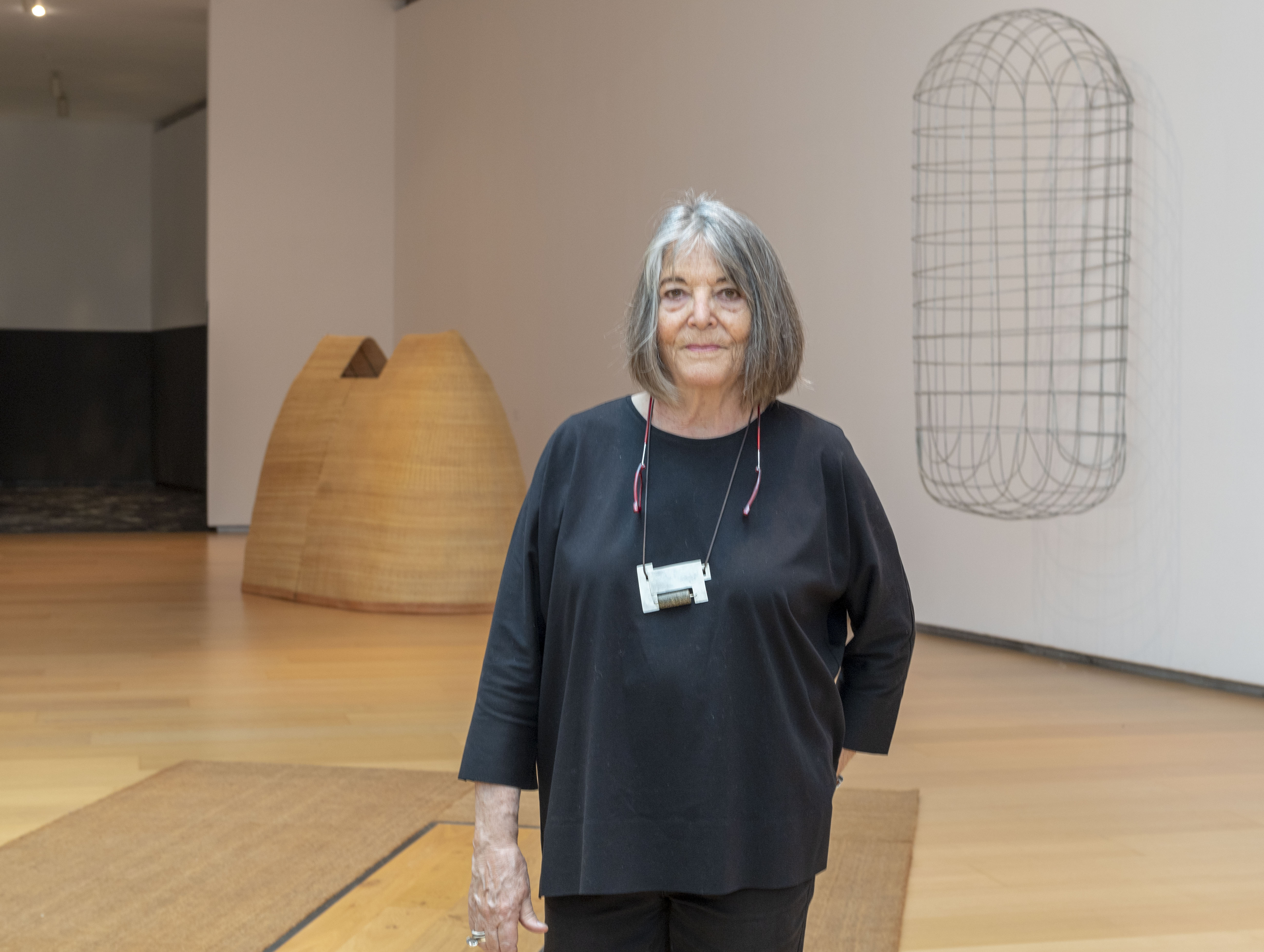
A portrait of Susana Solano

Susana Solano (born 1946) is a Spanish sculptor known for her large-scale sculpture, often made of sheet metal and wire mesh. She lives and works in Barcelona.

== Education and early life ==
Susana Solano was born in 1946 in Barcelona. She was educated at the Real acadèmia Catalana de bellas artes de San Jorge. Solano began her artistic career as a painter, developing her characteristic sculptural style only in the late 1970s. Solano has stated that memories of her childhood in Barcelona influence her work.

== Work ==
After Solano's transition from painting to sculpture, her earliest sculptures were made of hanging canvas. In her mature work, Solano's primary medium is sheet iron. Although earlier works included more organic forms, in the mid-1980s Solano's sculptures shifted to a more minimalist and geometric style. At this time, Solano also began including additional materials in her sculptures, including glass and wire mesh.

In addition to her sculptures, Solano has made works on paper throughout her career.

== Exhibitions ==
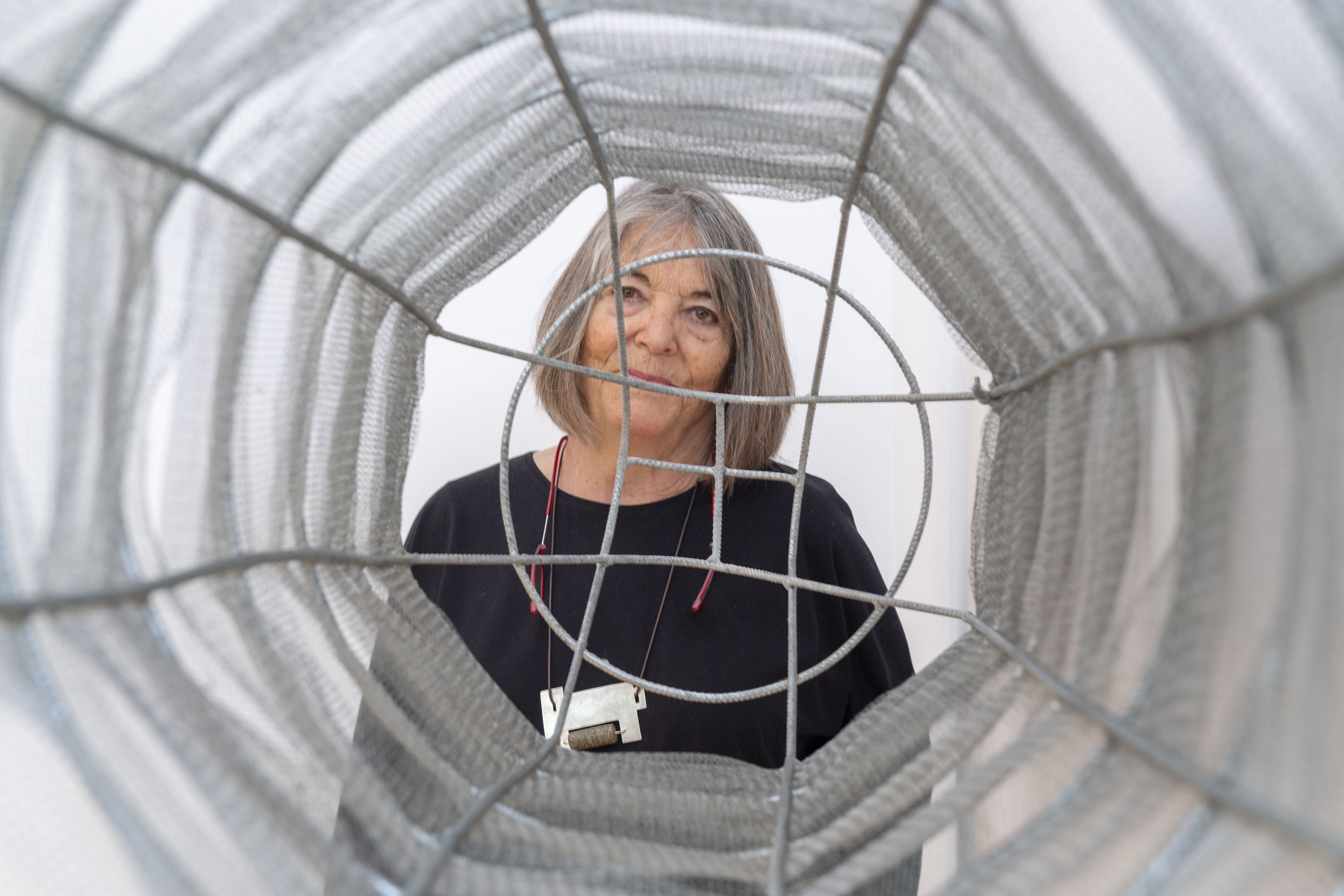
Susana Solana in 2019, Institut Valencià d'Art Modern.

Solano's work has been shown extensively throughout Spain, as well as Europe and the United States. Solano's first retrospective was organized by the Museo Nacional Centro de Arte Reina Sofia, in 1993. Her first solo show in New York City was in 1996 at McKee Gallery.

Solano is represented in the United States by Jack Shainman Gallery, in New York City. Her work was first shown there in 2013, with the exhibition A meitat de camí – Halfway there.

== Honors and awards ==
Solano represented Spain in the 43rd Venice Biennale, in 1988.

The same year, she received Spain's National Award for Plastic Arts.

== Collections ==
Solano's work is included in public collections including the following:

- Barcelona Museum of Contemporary Art, Barcelona, Spain
- Carnegie Museum of Art, Pittsburgh, PA
- Fine Arts Museums of San Francisco, San Francisco, CA
- Guggenheim Bilbao, Bilbao, Spain
- Collezione Gori, Fattoria di Celle, Santomato, Italy
- Museo Nacional Centro de Arte Reina Sofía, Madrid, Spain
- Museum moderner Kunst Stiftung Ludwig Wien, Vienna, Austria
- Museum of Modern Art, New York, NY
- Norwegian Museum of Contemporary Art, Oslo, Norway
- Speed Art Museum, Louisville, KY
- Stedelijk Museum, Amsterdam, Netherlands
