= Dora García =

Spanish artist

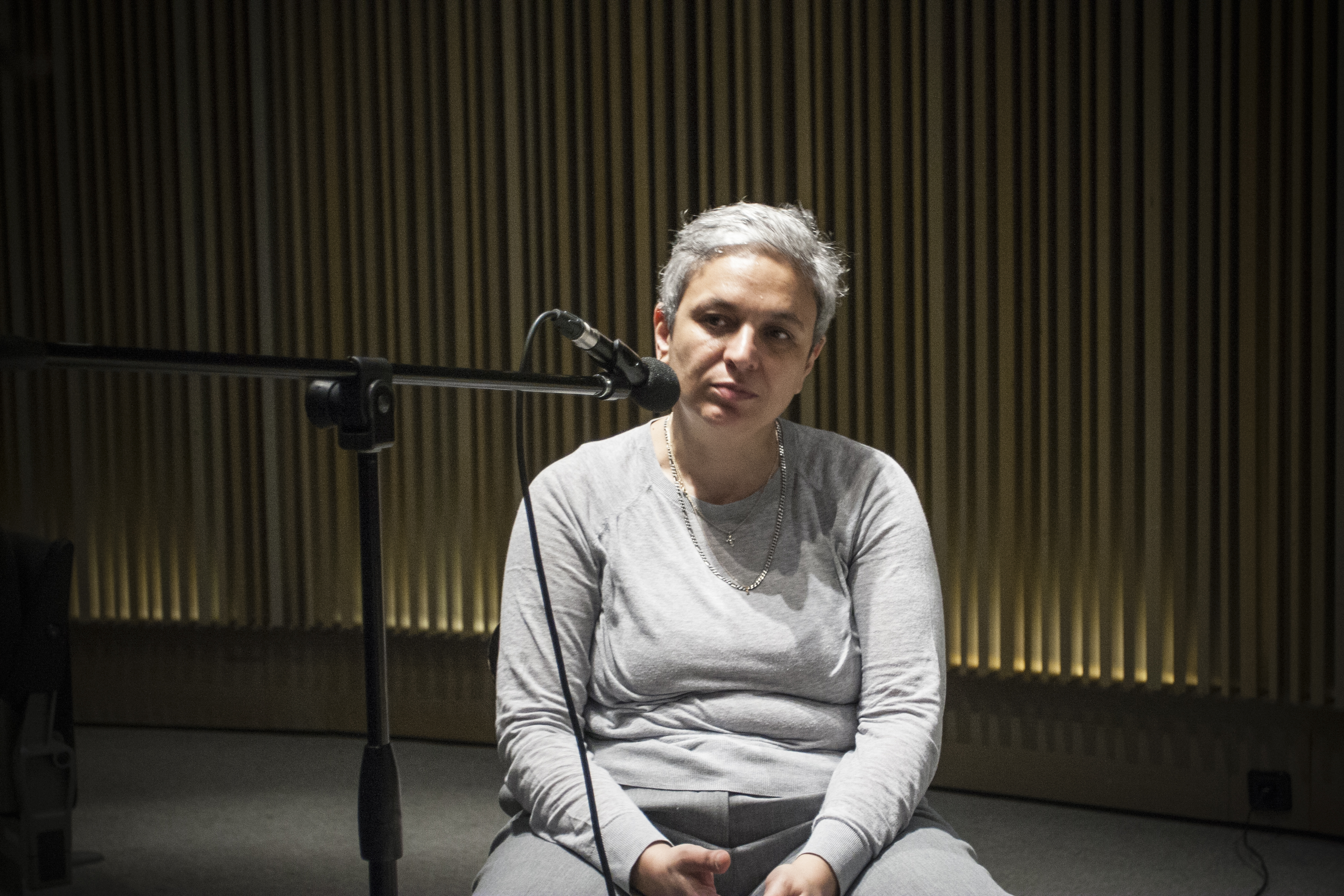
- Dora García at the Spanish Pavilion 54 Venice Biennale project The Inadequate
- Born: 1965 (age 60–61); Valladolid, Spain
- Education: University of Salamanca; Rijksakademie
- Awards: National Award for Plastic Arts (2021); Premio Castilla y León de las Artes (2024)
- Website: www.doragarcia.net

Dora García (born 1965) is a contemporary Spanish artist. García draws on interactivity and performance in her work, using the exhibition space as a platform to investigate the relationship between artwork, audience, and place. García transforms spaces into a sensory experiences by altering perception and creating situations of interaction, often using intermediaries (professional actors, amateurs, or people she meets by chance) to enhance critical thinking. By engaging with the binary of reality vs. fiction, visitors become implicated as protagonists either in the construction of a collective fiction or questioning of empirical constructions–sometimes knowingly, and sometimes not. Since 1999 García has created several artworks on the web.

== Work ==
Dora García was born in Spain and studied in Amsterdam, the Netherlands. As a young artist she moved to Brussels where she lived for 16 years.

She participated with the real time theatre in public space "The Beggar's Opera". in Münster Sculpture Projects 2007, where the character Charles Filch made his first appearance in her work. She has always been interested in anti-heroic and marginal personas as a prototype to study the social status of the artist, and in narratives of resistance and counterculture. In this regard, Dora García has developed works on the DDR political police, the Stasi ("Rooms, Conversations", film, 24 ', 2006), on the charismatic figure of US stand up comedian Lenny Bruce ("Just because everything is different it does not mean that anything has changed, Lenny Bruce in Sydney", one-time performance, Sydney Biennale, 2008) or on the origins, rhizomatic associations and consequences of antipsychiatry ("Mad Marginal" book series since 2010, "The Deviant Majority", film, 34', 2010).

In the last years, she has used classical TV formats to research Germany's most recent history ("Die Klau Mich Show", Documenta13, 2012), frequented Finnegans Wake reading groups ("The Joycean Society", film, 53', 2013), created meeting points for voice hearers ("The Hearing Voices Café", since 2014) and researched the crossover between performance and psychoanalysis ("The Sinthome Score", 2013, and "Segunda Vez", 2017).

In 2018 the Museo Nacional Centro de Arte Reina Sofía in Madrid presented Segunda Vez, a survey of her earlier work. From 2018 she worked on the long-term research project Amor Rojo, centred on the legacy of the Marxist feminist Alexandra Kollontai.

She represented Spain at the 54th Venice Biennale in 2011, and presented her work in the next Biennale 2013 in the collateral events, and in the international exhibition of the Biennale 2015, curated by Okwui Ewenzor.

== Biography ==
García was born in Valladolid, Spain and studied Fine Arts at the University of Salamanca, Spain, and the Rijksakademie in Amsterdam, Holland. She is represented by Michel Rein Gallery, Paris/Brussels, ProjecteSD Barcelona, galería Juana de Aizpuru, Madrid, and Ellen de Bruijne Projects, Amsterdam.

García lives between Barcelona and Oslo and is a professor at the Oslo National Academy of the Arts. She was a faculty member of the Independent Studies Programme (PEI) at MACBA in Barcelona from 2015 to 2020, and between 2012 and 2018 co-directed Les Laboratoires d'Aubervilliers in Paris. She has also been a fellow of the Real Academia de España en Roma, where she developed the project Líneas de Tiempo.

== Awards ==
In 2021 Dora García received the National Award for Plastic Arts. In 2024 she received the Premio Castilla y León de las Artes.

== Selected exhibitions ==
Selected exhibitions include: documenta 13, Kassel, Germany, 2012; Gwangju Biennale, South Korea, 2010; Lyon Biennial, France, 2009; TATE Modern, London, UK, 2008; Centre Pompidou, Paris, France, 2008; SMAK, Gent, Belgium, 2006, MUSAC, Leon, Spain, 2004, MACBA, Barcelona, Spain, 2002.

== Selected collections ==
- Museo Nacional Centro de Arte Reina Sofía, Madrid, Spain
- Fundación La Caixa Collection, Barcelona, Spain
- Coca-Cola Foundation Collection, Spain
- Museo de Vitoria, Spain
- MUSAC, León, Spain
- MACBA, Barcelona, Spain
- Centro Andaluz de Arte Contemporáneo, Sevilla, Spain
- FRAC Bourgogne, Dijon, France
- FRAC Languedoc-Rousillon, Montpellier, France
- FRAC Lorraine, Metz, France
- FRAC Ile-de-France Le Plateau, Paris, France
- Fundación ARCO, Spain
- Henry Art Foundation, Seattle, USA
- Galerie Fur Zeitgenössische Kunst, Leipzig, Germany
- Centre National des Arts Plastiques, France
- SFMOMA, San Francisco
- Kadist Art Foundation, Paris, San Francisco
