= Manuel Boix =

Spanish painter and sculptor (1942–2026)

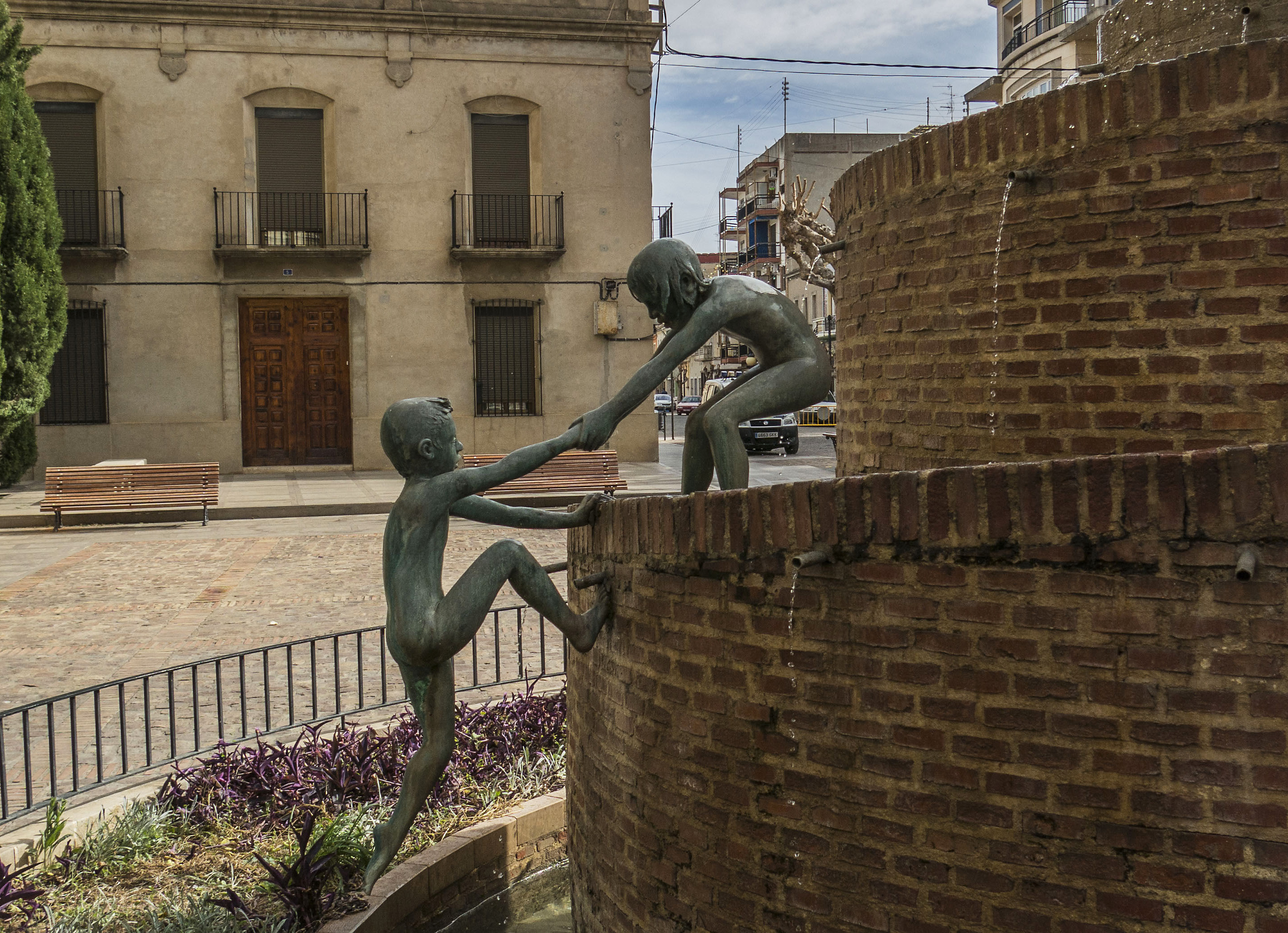
- Sculpture made by Boix in Albalat de la Ribera
- Born: Manuel Boix Álvarez; 18 December 1942; L'Alcúdia, Spain
- Died: 23 September 2026 (aged 83); L'Alcúdia, Spain
- Occupations: Painter, sculptor

Manuel Boix Álvarez (18 December 1942 – 23 September 2026) was a Spanish painter and sculptor. He was a recipient of the National Award for Plastic Arts of Spain (1980).

Boix died in L'Alcúdia on 23 September 2026, at the age of 83.
