= Santiago Sierra =

Spanish artist (born 1966)

Santiago Sierra (born 1966) is a Spanish artist, known for performance art and installation art. Much of his work deals with the topic of social inequities. He lives in Madrid.

== Career ==
Sierra's most well-known works involve hiring laborers to complete menial tasks. These works are meant to elucidate the nature of the laborer within Capitalist society, how the laborer sells his physical labor and thus his body, political issues such as immigration and continual immigrant poverty in Capitalist countries, the nature of work in Capitalist society, and the isolation of economic classes.

He achieves this through a number of techniques that present these themes and also question the nature of the art institution. While Sierra is critical of capitalism and the institutions which support it, he is also considered a successful artist. He is aware of this contradiction when he says, "self-criticism makes you feel morally superior, and I give high society and high culture the mechanisms to unload their morality and their guilt."

Some of Sierra's most famous works have involved paying a man to live behind a brick wall for 15 days, paying Iraqi immigrants to wear protective clothing and be coated in hardening polyurethane foam as "free form" sculptures, blocking the entrance of Lisson Gallery with a metal wall on opening night, sealing the entrance of the Spanish Pavilion at the Venice Biennale, only to allow Spanish citizens in to see an exhibition of left over pieces of the previous year's exhibition. Another of his well-known projects is a room of mud in Hanover, Germany, commemorating the job-creation measure origin of the Maschsee. In 2006, he provoked controversy with his installation "245 cubic metres", a gas chamber created inside a former synagogue in Pulheim, Germany. About the Biennale piece, Sierra said, "In the context of the biennial we are all playing at national pride, and I wanted to reveal that as the principal system of every pavilion...you can't forget that the countries that participate in the Biennale are the most powerful ones in the world. I mean, there's no pavilion for Ethiopia. So the theme was already a given." About his conception of nationalism for this work, Sierra has said "A nation is actually nothing; countries don't exist. When astronauts went into space they did not see a line between France and Spain; France is not painted pink and Spain blue. They are political constructions, and what's inside a construction? Whatever you want to put there."

In 2010 he received Spain's National Award for Plastic Arts but publicly rejected it, claiming his independence from a state which shows "contempt for the mandate to work for the common good".

He organised the installation of an anarchist black flag at the North Pole, which was placed on 14 April 2015. This was followed up with the installation of another flag at the South Pole on 14 December 2016.

In 2018 Sierra included a portrait of Carles Puigdemont into “Contemporary Spanish Political Prisoners” exhibition in Madrid. It was ordered to be removed on 23 February 2018.

In 2020 Sierra invited First Nations peoples from places colonised by the British empire to donate blood for an artwork called Union Flag; the Dark Mofo festival cancelled plans to show the artwork after a backlash led by Indigenous Australian artists.

== Theme ==
In explanation of his work, Sierra has said, "What I do is refuse to deny the principles that underlie the creation of an object of luxury: from the watchman who sits next to a Monet for eight hours a day, to the doorman who controls who comes in, to the source of the funds used to buy the collection. I try to include all this, and therein lies the little commotion about remuneration that my pieces have caused." More specific to his questioning of art institutions and capitalism, he said "At the Kunstwerke in Berlin they criticized me because I had people sitting for four hours a day, but they didn't realize that a little further up the hallway the guard spends eight hours a day on his feet...any of the people who make those criticisms have never worked in their lives; if they think it's a horror to sit hidden in a cardboard box for four hours, they don't know what work is...And of course extreme labor relations shed much more light on how the labor system actually works." Sierra has a displayed interest in visibility and invisibility. He explains the result of his work that pursues these interests, saying "The museum watchman I paid to live for 365 hours behind a wall at P.S.1 in New York told me that no one had ever been so interested in him and that he had never met so many people. I realized that hiding something is a very effective working technique. The forgotten people want to communicate..."
