= Hanging Houses of Cuenca =

Group of historic houses in Cuenca, Spain

Hanging Houses
- Casas Colgadas
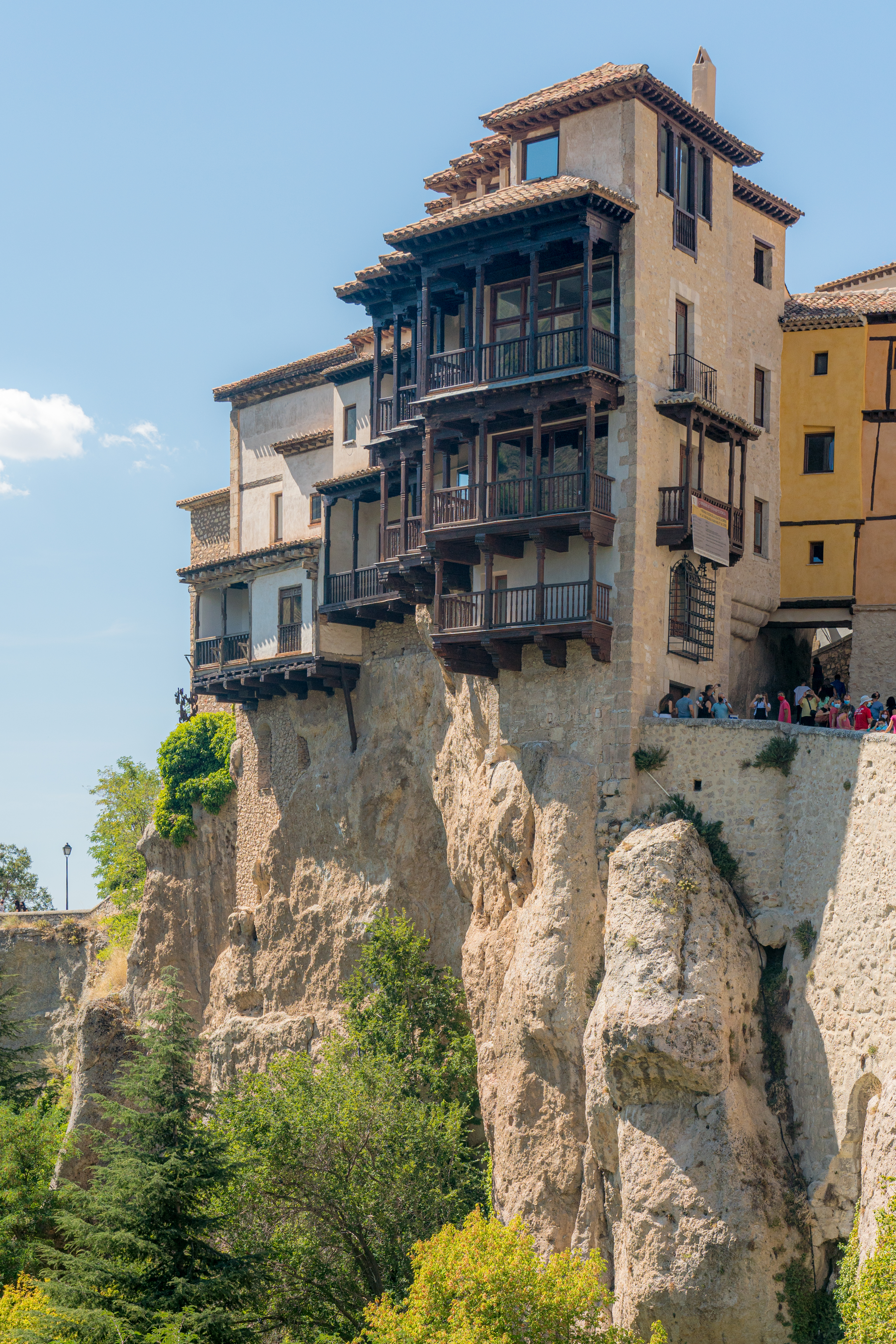
- View from the San Pablo bridge
- Interactive map of the Hanging Houses area

General information
- Location: Calle Canónigos, Cuenca, Spain
- Current tenants: Spanish Museum of Abstract Art

The Hanging Houses (Spanish: Casas Colgadas) is a complex of houses located in Cuenca, Spain. In the past, houses of this kind were frequent along the eastern border of the ancient city, located near the ravine of the river Huécar. Today, however, there are only a few of them remaining. Of all of these structures, the most well-known is a group of three with wooden balconies.

Their origin remains uncertain, though there is proof of their existence in the 15th century. Throughout their history they have been refurbished several times. The most recent took place during the 1920s.

They have been used as individual homes, council houses, and in the past hosted a mesón, a type of restaurant, and the Museo de Arte Abstracto Español (Spanish Abstract Art Museum), in Cuenca.
