= Martín Chirino =

Spanish sculptor (1925–2019)

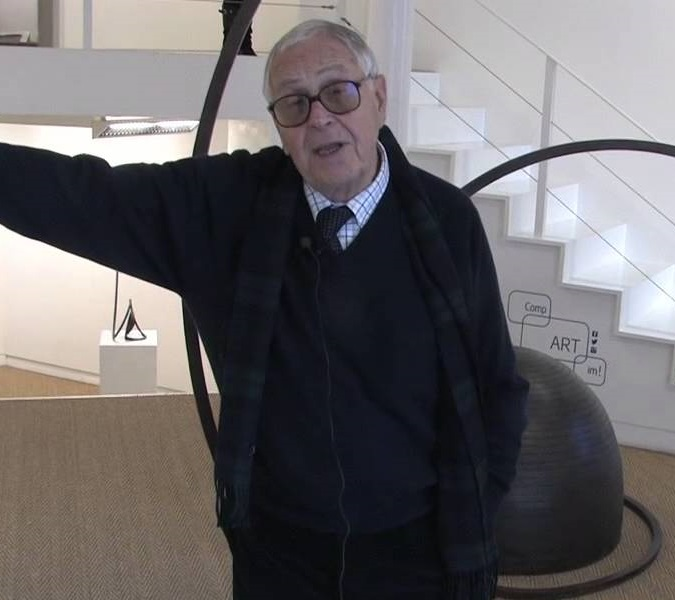
- Chirino in 2014
- Born: Martín Chirino López; 1 March 1925; Las Palmas de Gran Canaria, Spain
- Died: 11 March 2019 (aged 94); Madrid, Spain
- Awards: National Award for Plastic Arts (1980)
- Website: www.martinchirino.com

Martín Chirino López (Las Palmas de Gran Canaria, 1 March 1925 – 11 March 2019) was a Spanish sculptor. Cofounder of the group El Paso (The Step) in 1957, Chirino worked mainly with iron and his work is categorized as abstract art.

== Biography ==
=== First years ===
Chirino was born on 1 March 1925 in Las Palmas de Gran Canaria, in the Las Canteras area.

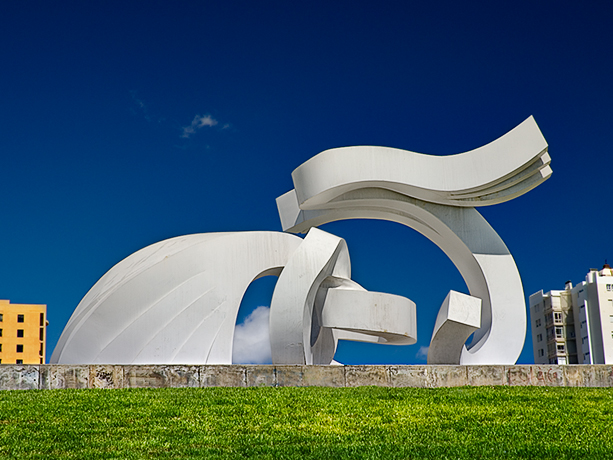
Lady Harimaguada, Las Palmas de Gran Canaria.

In 1948 Chirino traveled to Madrid, where he studied at the Royal Academy of Fine Arts of San Fernando.

In 1952 he finished his Fine Arts studies obtaining the degree of professor. The next year he traveled to London where he attended classes at the Royal Academy of Arts where he finished his education as a sculptor. After that he returned to Las Palmas where he developed a strong cooperation with his friend Manolo Millares.

=== Relocation to Madrid. El Paso ===
After doing his first exhibitions in the Canary Islands Chirino traveled to Madrid on 14 September 1955, along with his friends Manolo Millares, Elvireta Escobio, Manuel Padorno and Alejandro Reino. He held his first individual exhibition at the Ateneo de Madrid. In February 1957 the group El Paso (The Step) was founded, with Antonio Saura, Manolo Millares, Manuel Rivera, Rafael Canogar, Luis Feito, Antonio Suárez, Pablo Serrano, Juana Francés, José Ayllón and Manuel Conde. Martín Chirino joined the group after his exhibition at the Ateneo de Madrid, along with Manuel Viola.

In May 1960 the El Paso group was dissolved due to internal differences. Chirino then opened his workshop in San Sebastián de los Reyes designed by Antonio Fernández Alba, an architect close to the disbanded El Paso group.

=== Solo work ===
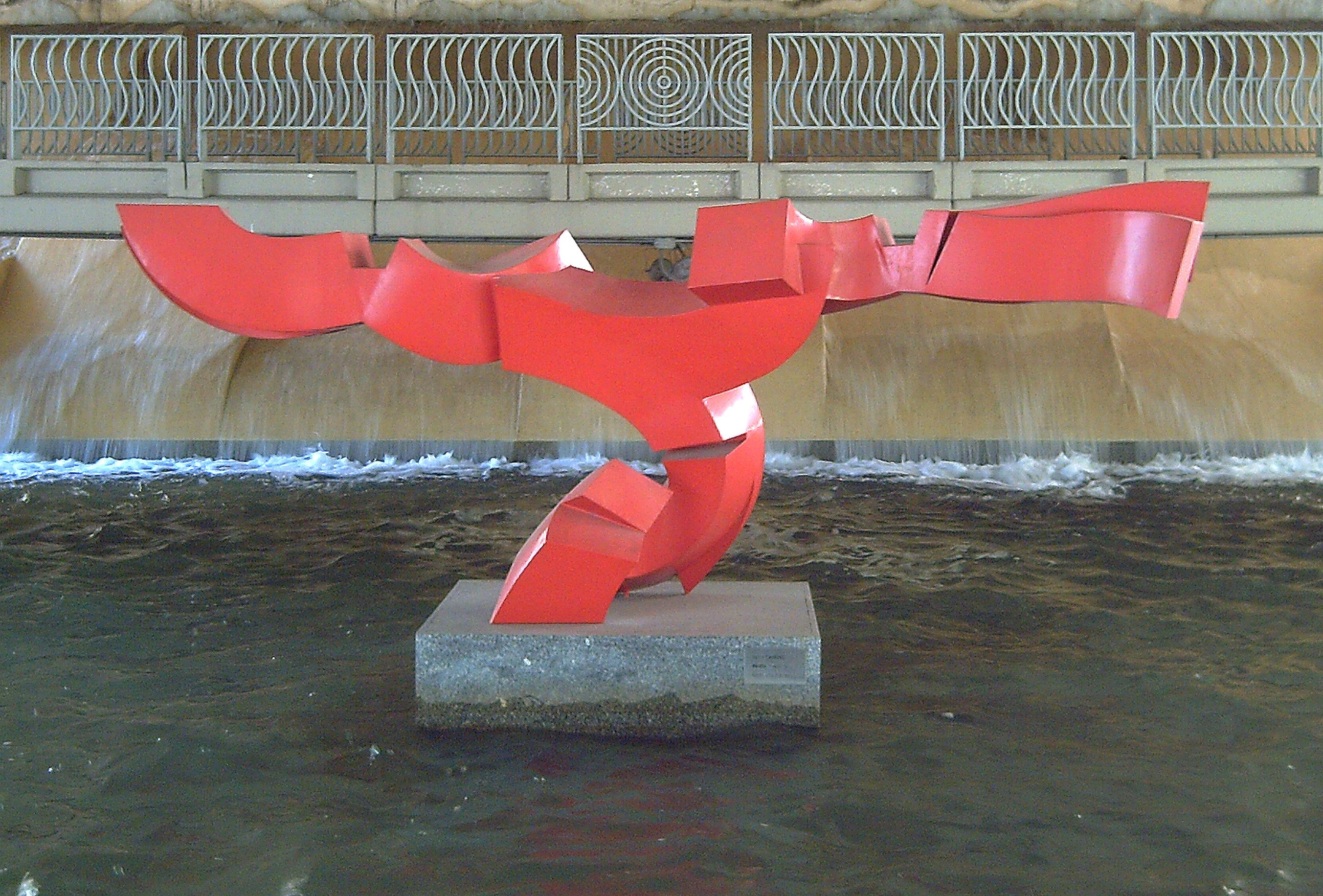
Mediterránea, at the Museo Arte Público of Madrid.

In 1964, a two-month trip to Greece inspires his "Mediterránea" series. In 1966 he attended the inauguration of the Museo de Arte Abstracto Español in Cuenca, Spain, the museum purchased two of his works for its permanent collection: "Raíz" (1958) and "El Viento" (1966).

In 1969 the Grace Borgenicht Gallery of New York City, hosted a solo exhibition of "Mediterráneas". The sculptures in this collection are made of iron sheets painted in vivid colors. Around this time Chirino started to work with sheets, creating hollowed volumes.

At the X Concorso Internazionale del Bronzetto de Padova Chirino was given his first international award. At a new exhibition at the Grace Borgenicht Gallery, he presented his new collection, the "Aeróvoros", apparently ingravid, flying sculptures that where baptized by Maud Westerdahl. The Guggenheim Museum acquired one.

In 1978 he received the first prize at the International Biennale of sculpture in Budapest.

In 1979 his exhibition "Afrocan" at the Grace Borgenicht Gallery received positive reviews from the New York press.

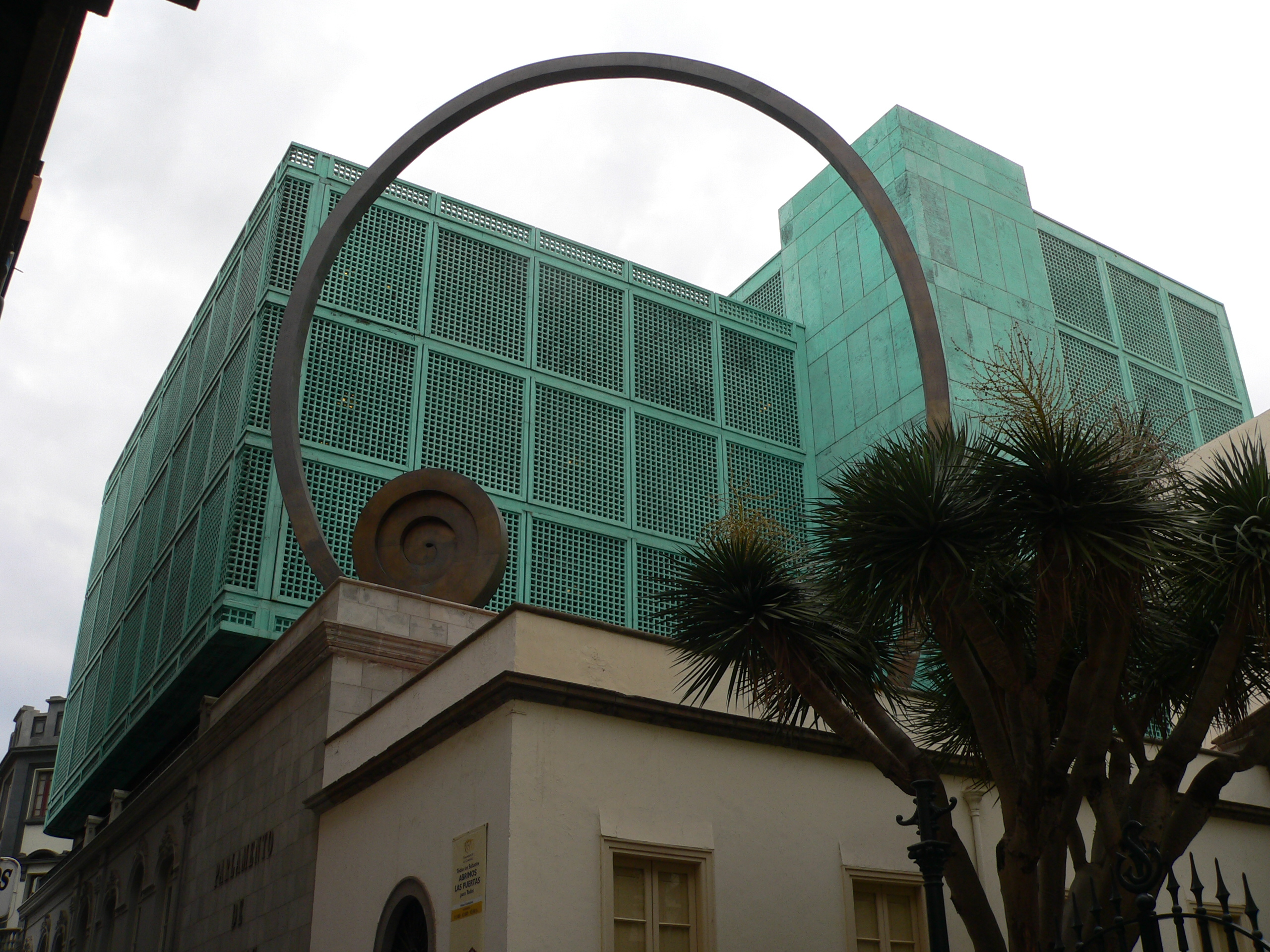
Canarian Parliament Building, Santa Cruz de Tenerife.

In 1980 he received the Spanish National Award for Plastic Arts for his body of work. Five years later he was awarded the Gold Medal of Merit in the Fine Arts.

In 1989 Chirinos was appointed director of the newly inaugurated Centro Atlántico de Arte Moderno (CAAM) in Las Palmas de Gran Canaria. At the time he was also director of the Círculo de Bellas Artes of Madrid a position he had held since 1982.

In 1996 "Lady Harimaguada" was inaugurated, it was later adopted as a symbol of the city and the design used as the trophy awarded at the Festival Internacional de Cine de Las Palmas de Gran Canaria. In 1999 his Spiral was installed at the Canarian Parliament Building, that uses it as its symbol. The Universidad de Las Palmas de Gran Canaria also includes in its logo an image of the sculpture "El Pensador" installed at its Tafira campus.

In 2002 Chirino resigned as director of the CAAM, in the middle of a controversial remodeling of the museum. On 11 October 2014 he was appointed as honorary member of the Real Academia de Bellas Artes de San Fernando.

Martín Chirino died in Madrid on 11 March 2019 at the age of 94.
