= Ron Gorchov =

American artist (1930–2020)

- Born: April 5, 1930; Chicago, Illinois, U.S.
- Died: August 18, 2020 (aged 90); Red Hook, Brooklyn, New York City, New York, U.S.
- Education: Art Institute of Chicago, University of Mississippi, Roosevelt College and Art Institute, University of Illinois Urbana-Champaign
- Occupation: Painter
- Spouses: Joy Gorchov Tomme, Karen Chaplin, Marilyn Lenkowsky, Sharma Bennett, Veronika Sheer
- Children: 2

Ron Gorchov (April 5, 1930 – August 18, 2020) was an American artist. He was known for his colorful, abstract paintings on curved canvases.

In the late 1960s, he began making oil-on-linen paintings on distinctive saddle-like stretchers, at once concave and convex, featuring one or two biomorphic shapes against differently colored backgrounds. These, along with the multi-paneled, "stacked" paintings, which Gorchov began making in the early 1970s, are to this day the primary support structure for the artist's work. Bridging sculpture and abstract painting, Gorchov's singular artistic vocabulary challenged the methodologies of traditional painting.

Works by Gorchov have been exhibited at the Museum of Modern Art, the Whitney Museum of American Art, MoMA PS1, the Queens Museum of Art, the New Museum of Contemporary Art, and Centro Atlántico de Arte Moderno, among other institutions. His works are included in the collections of the Metropolitan Museum of Art, the Museum of Modern Art, the Whitney Museum, the Detroit Institute of Arts, and the Guggenheim, among others.

== Education and early years ==
Ron Gorchov was born on April 5, 1930, in Chicago, Illinois. In 1944, at the age of fourteen, he was invited to take Saturday classes at the Art Institute of Chicago. Many of his fellow students, who were servicemen returning from World War II, who had used the G.I. Bill benefits to pay for art materials. Gorchov remembered in a 2006 interview, "a veteran named Jered Hoffman gave me a paper bag with all his half-squeezed oil paint tubes and a whole bunch of old brushes and he said they'd be good luck".

Gorchov attended the University of Mississippi from 1947 to 1948. In 1948, he returned to Chicago and attended the Roosevelt College (now Roosevelt University), and the School of the Art Institute of Chicago; followed by the University of Illinois Urbana-Champaign in Urbana, Illinois, in 1950 to 1951.

== New York City ==
In 1953, Gorchov moved to New York City with his wife Joy Gorchov Tomme and newborn son, Michael. The family moved into the Marlton Hotel, across the street from the old location of the Whitney Museum, and what is now the New York Studio School. In the late 1950s, Gorchov developed a friendship with John D. Graham, himself an important influence on such artists as Arshile Gorky, and Jackson Pollock. He also became acquainted with members of this generation of artists largely tied to the Abstract Expressionism movement, including Mark Rothko, Willem de Kooning, Knox Martin, and Al Held, among others.

Gorchov's break-through on the New York art scene came in 1960, as part of the Whitney Museum's Young America 1960: Thirty American Painters Under ThirtySix. The same year, Gorchov had his first show with Tibor de Nagy Gallery, followed by two more solo shows in 1963 and 1966.

Gorchov became in the late 1960s and early 1970s associated with a group of Manhattan-based abstract artists, such as Frank Stella, Richard Tuttle, and Ellsworth Kelly, who rejected the ubiquitous rectangular canvas in favour of new shapes and configurations.

== Exhibitions ==
In 1972, he showed the monumental stacked paintings "Set", "Entrance", and "Strand", all from 1971, at the Everson Museum of Art in Syracuse, New York. He had a solo show at the Fischbach Gallery in 1975, and was included in the inaugural Rooms show at P.S.1 Contemporary Art Center, in 1976, for which he showed "Set". From then through the mid 1990s, Gorchov had solo exhibitions at Susanne Hilberry Gallery (1977, 1985, 1994), Hamilton Gallery (1979, 1980), and Jack Tilton Gallery (1990, 1992), among others. In 2006, Gorchov's recent works were included in a solo show at PS1 entitled "Ron Gorchov: Double Trouble".

After that, the artist had solo shows at Nicholas Robinson Gallery, New York (2008); Atlantic Center of Modern Art (Spanish: Centro Atlántico de Arte Moderno), Las Palmas de Gran Canaria, Spain (2011); Cheim & Read, New York (2012); Thomas Brambilla gallery, Bergamo, Italy (2015, 2018–2019).

== Death and legacy ==
Gorchov died on August 18, 2020, in Red Hook, Brooklyn at the age of 90. He was survived by his wife, and two children from his first marriage.

His work is found in many public museum collections including the Museum of Modern Art, the Metropolitan Museum of Art, the Art Institute of Chicago, Yale University Art Gallery, the Whitney Museum of American Art, Detroit Institute of Arts, the Nelson-Atkins Museum of Art, and the Philadelphia Museum of Art.

== Personal life ==
Gorchov was married five times and had two children. From 1952 to 1960, he was married to Joy Gorchov Tomme (née Lundberg), together they had one son and one daughter, ending in divorce. His second marriage was to Karen Chaplin, and ended in divorce in 1967. He was married to Marilyn Lenkowsky, and divorced in 1975; followed by a marriage to Sharma Bennett and a divorce in 1979. In 2012, he married Veronika Sheer, and the marriage ended with his death in 2020.
