= Esther Ferrer =

Spanish performance artist

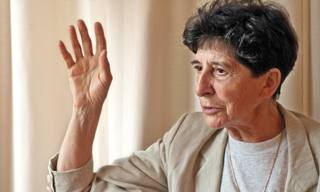
- Born: 1937 (age 88–89); San Sebastián, Spain
- Occupation: Artist
- Spouse: Tom Johnson
- Website: estherferrer.fr/en/

Esther Ferrer (born 1937 in San Sebastián, Spain) is a Spanish performance artist. Ferrer received Spain's National Award for Plastic Arts (1999), the Marie-Claire Prize for Contemporary Art in France, and the Velázquez Plastic Arts Prize.

== History and career ==
In 1966 she joined Walter Marchetti and Juan Hidalgo Codorniu in the Spanish performance art group Zaj, famous for its radical conceptual art performances, whose controversial "concerts" were presented in Spanish concert halls despite the censorship of Franco's regime. Zaj also performed in many other countries for thirty years, until 1996, when the group broke up after a retrospective in the Reina Sofia Museum in Madrid.

As a performer she has participated in festivals in Canada, Korea, the United States and Japan, and throughout Europe (France, Italy, Holland Belgium, Bulgaria, Switzerland, England, the Czech Republic, Poland, Denmark, Norway, Slovakia, Germany and Hungary). Her production also includes objects, photos, video pieces, visual systems based on prime numbers, and a large collection of self-portraits in many media.

Ferrer created two radio works for Radio Nacional de España: Al ritmo del tiempo (1992), a live radio performance first broadcast on Ars Sonora, and Ta, te, ti, to, tu (o la agricultura en la Edad Media) (1994), also produced for the programme.

Ferrer represented Spain in the Venice Bienal in 1999, and did large individual shows in subsequent years in the FRAC Bretagne (Rennes, France), MACVAL (Val de Marne, France), and with the Instituto Cervantes in several South American cities. Ferrer's work was included in the 2021 exhibition Women in Abstraction at the Centre Pompidou. In autumn 2022 opened a solo retrospective exhibit at the Art and Culture Foundation Opelvillen Rüsselsheim, as part of Spain being guest of honor at the 2022 Frankfurt book fair. In September 2022, Esther Ferrer was the recipient of the Prix international de Littérature Bernard Heidsieck Prix d'honneur awarded by the Centre Pompidou and Archivio Conz.

Ferrer was married to minimalist composer Tom Johnson until his death in late-2024.
