= National Award for Plastic Arts (Spain) =

Spanish arts award

- Premio Nacional de Artes Plásticas
- Awarded for: Works or actions which contribute to Spain's cultural heritage
- Sponsored by: Ministry of Culture
- Country: Spain
- Reward: €30,000
- First award: 1980
- Website: www.culturaydeporte.gob.es/cultura/areas/promociondelarte/mc/premiosbbaa/pn-artes-plasticas/pnap/presentacion.html

The National Award for Plastic Arts (Spanish: Premio Nacional de Artes Plásticas) is one of Spain's National Culture Awards for Fine Arts, along with the National Award for Photography and Velázquez Award for Plastic Arts. Established in 1980, it is granted annually by the Ministry of Culture to recognize the meritorious work of contemporary plastic artists. It is given for works or actions published in the prior year which contribute to the enrichment of Spain's cultural heritage. Despite being developed by an administrative body, the selection of the award's winners is intended to be a true reflection of the values and feelings of society. It is endowed with a prize of 30,000 euros.

Candidates for the award are presented by the members of a jury, or by entities related to the pertinent artistic or cultural activities, through reasoned proposals addressed to the Minister of Culture or to the jurors themselves.

In 2010 the artist Santiago Sierra rejected the award, claiming his independence from a state which shows "contempt for the mandate to work for the common good".

== Winners ==
Year	Artist	Field	Ref
1980	Juan Manuel Díaz Caneja	Painter	
1980	Antoni Cumella	Ceramist	
1980	Albert Ràfols-Casamada	Painter	
1980	Martín Chirino	Sculptor	
1980	Carola Torres	Weaver	
1980	Manuel Boix	Painter, sculptor, engraver	
1981	Manuel Ángeles Ortiz	Painter	
1981	Andreu Alfaro	Sculptor	
1981	Joan Hernández Pijuan	Painter, engraver	
1981	Luis Gordillo	Painter	
1981	José Hernández	Painter, graphic artist	
1982	Eduardo Arroyo	Painter	
1982	Josep Guinovart	Painter, illustrator, engraver	
1982	Julio López Hernández	Sculptor	
1982	Carmen Laffón	Painter, illustrator, sculptor	
1982	Rafael Canogar	Painter	
1983	Francesc Català Roca	Photographer	
1983	Alfonso Fraile	Painter	
1983	Lucio Muñoz	Painter	
1983	Manolo Valdés	Painter, engraver, sculptor	
1983	Darío Villalba	Painter, photographer	
1984	Juan Genovés	Painter, graphic artist	
1984	José Caballero	Painter	
1984	Manuel Hernández Mompó	Painter, sculptor	
1984	Baltasar Lobo	Sculptor	
1984	Agustí Centelles	Photographer	
1985	Juan Barjola	Painter	
1985	Guillermo Pérez Villalta	Painter, sculptor	
1986	Miquel Navarro	Painter, sculptor, engraver	
1986	Miquel Barceló	Painter	
1987	Not given		
1988	Susana Solano	Sculptor	
1989	José María Sicilia	Painter	
1990	Juan Navarro Baldeweg	Architect, painter, sculptor	
1991	Adolfo Schlosser	Sculptor	
1992	Carlos Alcolea	Painter	
1993	Soledad Sevilla	Painter	
1994	Eva Lootz	Sculptor	
1995	José Manuel Broto Gimeno	Painter	
1996	Miguel Ángel Campano	Painter	
1997	Ramón Gaya	Painter, writer	
1998	Cristino de Vera	Painter	
1999	Pablo Palazuelo	Painter, engraver, sculptor	
1999	Cristina Iglesias	Sculptor, engraver	
2000	Juan Muñoz	Sculptor	
2001	Juan José Aquerreta	Painter	
2002	Juan Uslé	Painter	
2003	Alfredo Alcaín	Painter	
2004	Carlos Pazos	Sculptor	
2005	Antoni Muntadas	Conceptual artist	
2006	Perejaume	Painter	
2007	Isidoro Valcárcel Medina	Conceptual artist	
2008	Esther Ferrer	Conceptual artist-performer	
2009	Nacho Criado	Conceptual artist	
2010	Santiago Sierra (refused)	Conceptual artist	
2011	Elena Asins	Plastic artist	
2012	Jaume Plensa	Sculptor	
2013	Carmen Calvo	Conceptual artist	
2014	Jordi Teixidor de Otto	Painter	
2015	Concha Jerez	Conceptual artist	
2016	Juan Hidalgo Codorniu	Musician, composer	
2017	Ángela de la Cruz	Painter	
2018	Ángel Bados	Sculptor	
2019	Àngels Ribé	Conceptual artist	
2020	José María Yturralde	Painter	
2021	Dora García	Artist, professor and researcher	
2022	Rogelio López Cuenca	Visual artist, poet	
2023	Teresa Lanceta	Textile artist, painter	
2024	Pedro G. Romero	Conceptual artist	
2025	Fina Miralles	Conceptual artist	

== See also ==
- Spanish art
