= Juan Hidalgo Codorniu =

Spanish composer, poet, and artist

Juan Hidalgo Codorniu (14 October 1927 – 26 February 2018) was a Spanish composer, poet, an action and visual artist.

== Biography ==
Hidalgo was born in Las Palmas, Canary Islands. After studying piano and composition in Barcelona and Paris with Nadia Boulanger and Bruno Maderna, he participated in the XII Internationale Ferienkurse Für Neue Musik festival in Darmstadt in 1957 with his work "Ukanga", a serial-structural composition for five chamber ensembles. With this piece, Hidalgo became the first Spanish composer to take part in that festival. In 1958 Juan Hidalgo met the Darmstadt American composers John Cage and David Tudor who were crucial to his musical and career development.

In 1964 he founded the ZAJ group along with Walter Marchetti, Ramón Barce, and was later joined by Esther Ferrer and the writer José Luis Castillejo. ZAJ was an exponent of Spanish neodadaism with influences of zen and Marcel Duchamp's vision of the arts. There were said to be similarities in the philosophy and aesthetics of ZAJ and that of the Japanese Gutai and American Fluxus artistic movements.

In 1966 he participated alongside Gustav Metzger, Otto Muehl, Wolf Vostell, Hermann Nitsch and others in the Destruction in Art Symposium (DIAS) in London.

One of his possibly most interesting collaborations with John Cage took place in 1978 when Cage and fellow composer Walter Marchetti prepared a musical ride on a train, full of microphones, monitors and sounds directed by Cage himself. The people on board would hear the train's very noises enriched by an additional mix of local music and sounds, giving an audio-portrait of each stop.

Juan Hidalgo was considered one of the most creative artists of the Spanish avant-garde since the 1960s and had been active in other artistic fields such as poetry, photography, installation art, postcard art, print media, and performances, as well as participating in numerous international exhibitions and festival. In 2016 he received Spain's National Award for Plastic Arts.

He died in Ayacata, Spain, aged 90.
