= Zaj =

Zaj was an experimental music and performance art group formed in 1959 in Milan, Italy by composers and intermedia artists Walter Marchetti and Juan Hidalgo, with the support of the American composer John Cage. The group received major contributions by different artists from the Spanish avant-garde scene, notably from the writer and diplomat José Luis Castillejo and from the interdisciplinary artist Esther Ferrer. During the 1960s, members of Zaj took part in different Fluxus events organised by George Maciunas. With the help of John Cage and his agent Mimi Johnson, Zaj also toured in the United States in the late 1970s. The group officially disbanded in 1993.

== See also ==
- Musica Elettronica Viva

== Sources ==
- Barber, Llorenç, Juan Hidalgo, Ritmo. Vol. 566, 1986, pp. 112–13, ISSN 0035-5658
- Charles, Daniel, Performance (art et esthétique), Encyclopedia Universalis, France
- Hidalgo, Juan (w. John Cage, Morton Feldman, Leopoldo La Rosa, Walter Marchetti), Rumoriallarotonda, CD booklet (32 pages), ALGA MARGHEN, ITALY, ALGA 031CD, 1998
- La Motte-Haber, Helga de, Die Gruppe Zaj: Cage-Rezeption in romanischen Ländern (Grupo Zaj: Cage reception in Romance countries), Positionen: Beiträge zur Neuen Musik. no. 21, pp. 32–33. Nov 1994, ISSN 0941-4711
- Leyva Sanjuan, Antonio, Zaj: A conversation with Juan Hidalgo, Crónica. Vol. 3, no. 42, 1991, pp. 32–33, ISSN 1131-6705
- Medina Álvarez, Ángel, Primeras oleadas de vanguardistas en el área de Madrid (The first waves of the avant-garde in the Madrid area), in López-Calo, José (ed.), Spain in Western Music, Madrid, Spain: Ministerio de Cultura, 1987. 403, 504 pp
- Sarmiento, José Antonio, Críticas a un concierto Zaj (Reviews of a concert by Zaj), Cuenca, Spain: Ediciones + 491, 1991
