= Luis Gordillo =

Spanish artist and author (born 1934)

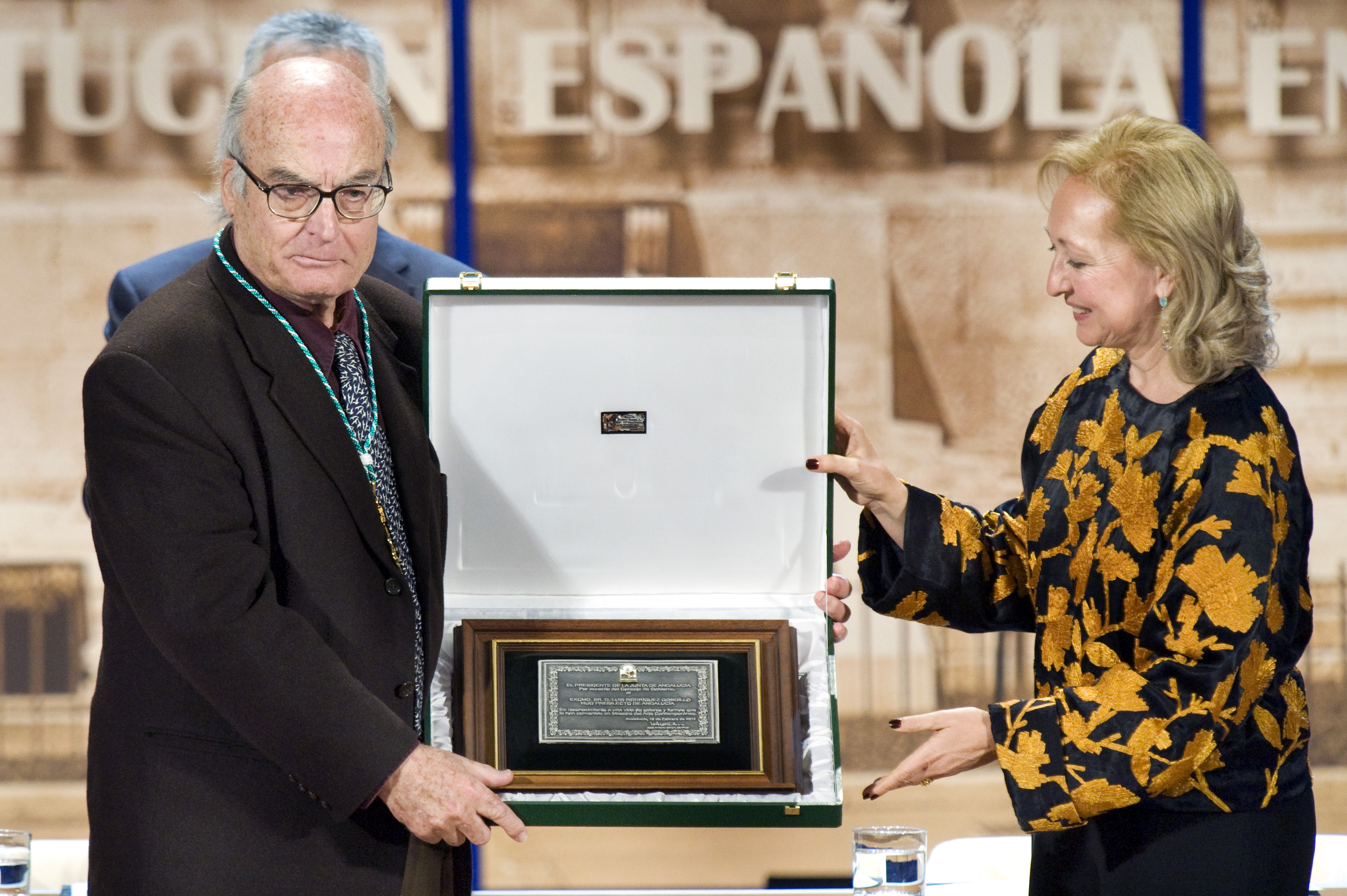
- Born: 1934 (age 91–92)
- Occupation: Painter
- Years active: 1960s-present

Luis Gordillo (born 1934) is a Spanish artist and author. He is one of Spain's most prolific painters, and has received numerous awards including the National Award for Plastic Arts and the Premio Velázquez de las Artes Plásticas. Some of his work is exhibited at the Reina Sofia Museum in Spain.

== Early life ==
Luis Gordillo was born in 1934 in Seville, Spain and was the second of eight children. He went to law school, but later decided to focus on art, attending the School of Fine Arts in Seville.

== Career ==
After completing his studies, Gordillo decided to move to Paris in 1958. At the time Spain was a dictatorship under Francisco Franco and art and media were heavily censored. Moving to Paris furthered his art studies in a country where he was free to do so.

During the 1960s he experienced an artist crisis, only drawing basic shapes and forms. In 1970 he experienced a renewal, utilizing bright colors.

In the 1980s his painting became less colorful and more abstract.

In 2017 he published an art book called Little Memories.

From 24 September - 12 December 2004, the Museo de Arte Abstracto Español, Cuenca exhibited Gordillo. Duplex featuring “57 works on the theme of duplicity produced between 1964 and 2003.” The exhibit later traveled to the Museu Fundación Juan March, Palma (20 December 2004 - 26 March 2005).

== Awards ==
- National Award for Plastic Arts (1981)
- Premio Velázquez de las Artes Plásticas (2007)

== Notable works ==
- Gran bombo duplex (1967)
- Choque (1968)
- Caballero cubista con lágrimas (1973)
- Suicida triple (1974)
- Sistema lábil (1975–76)
- Serie Luna (1977)
- Salta-ojos (conejitos) (1980)
- Despectivo en campo verde (1981)
- Segunda serie roja (1982)
