= Miquel Barceló =

Spanish painter (born 1957)

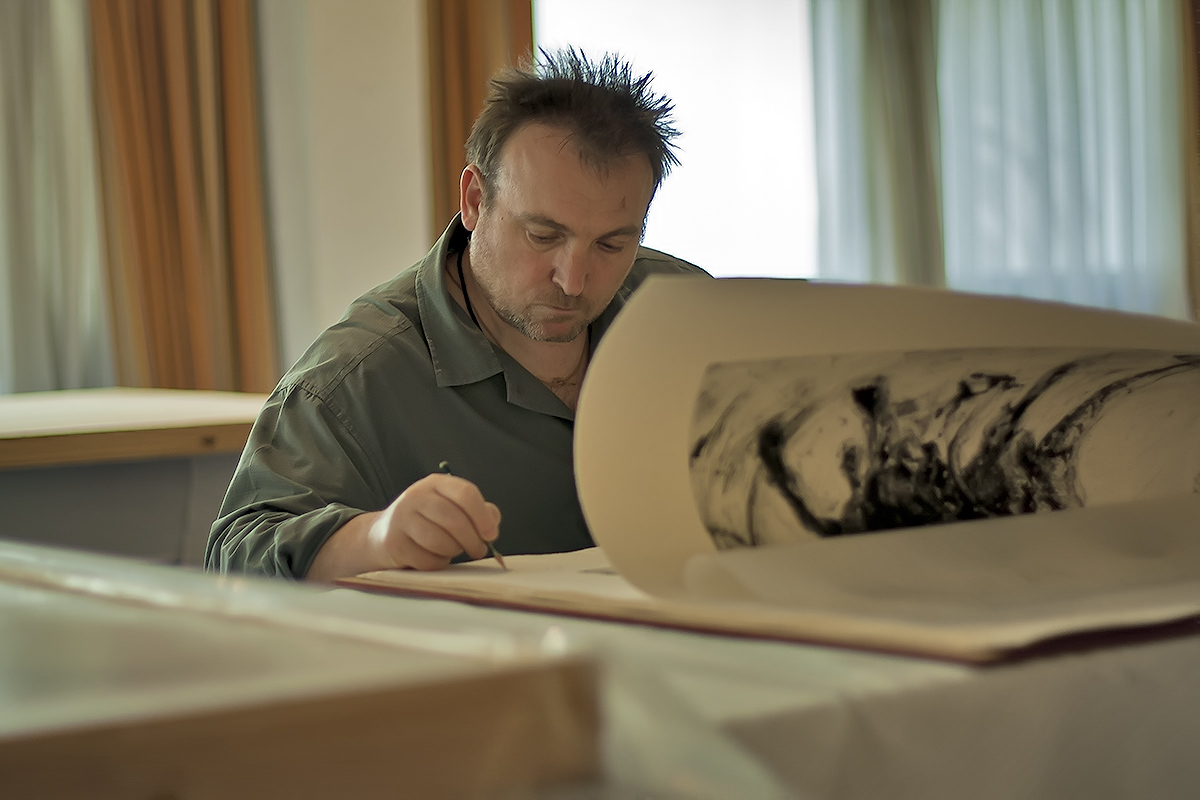
Miquel Barceló in 2011

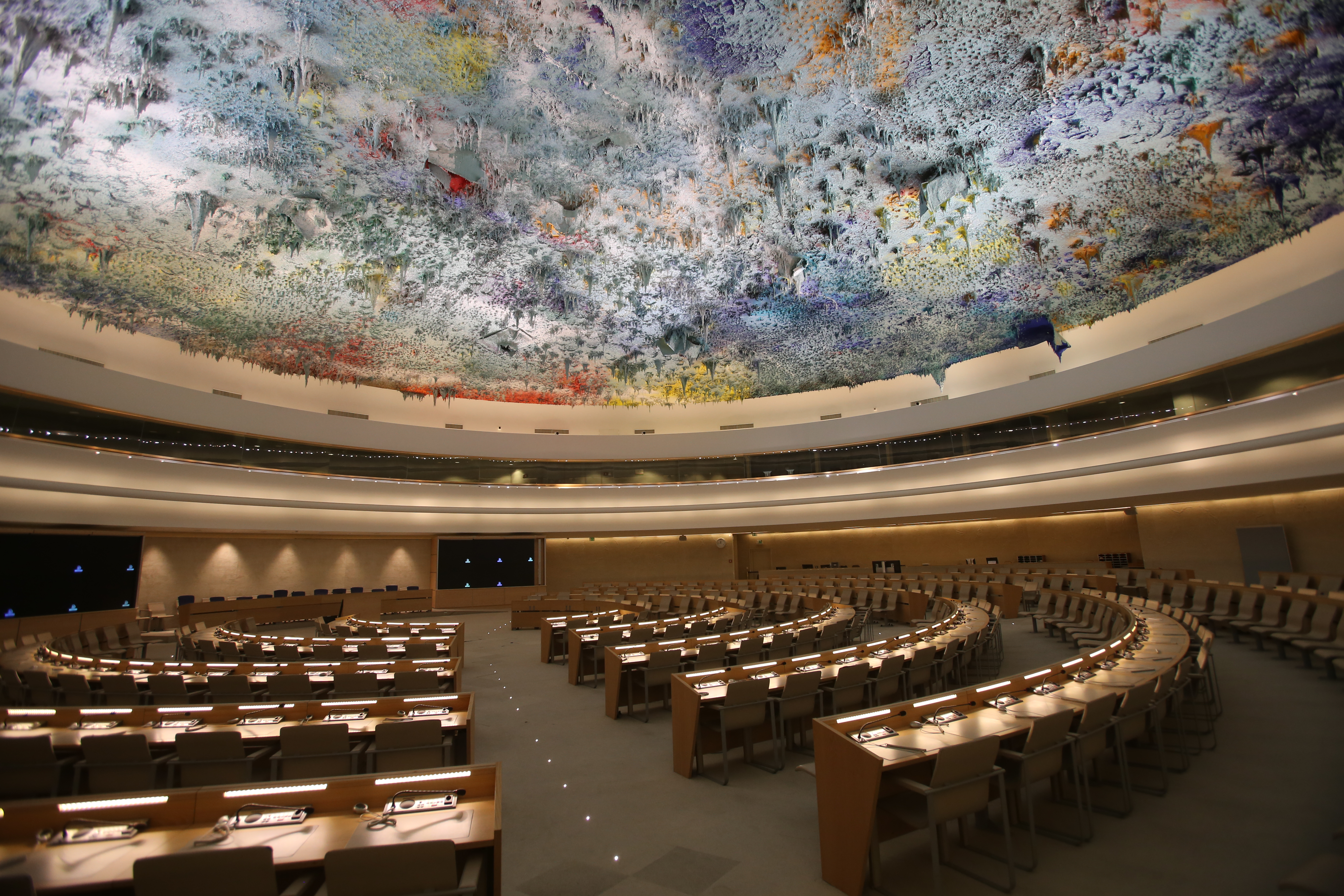
Miquel Barceló decorated the ceiling of the Human Rights and Alliance of Civilizations Room, used by the United Nations Human Rights Council, in the Palace of Nations (Geneva).

Miquel Barceló Artigues (born 1957) is a Spanish painter and sculptor.

== Career ==
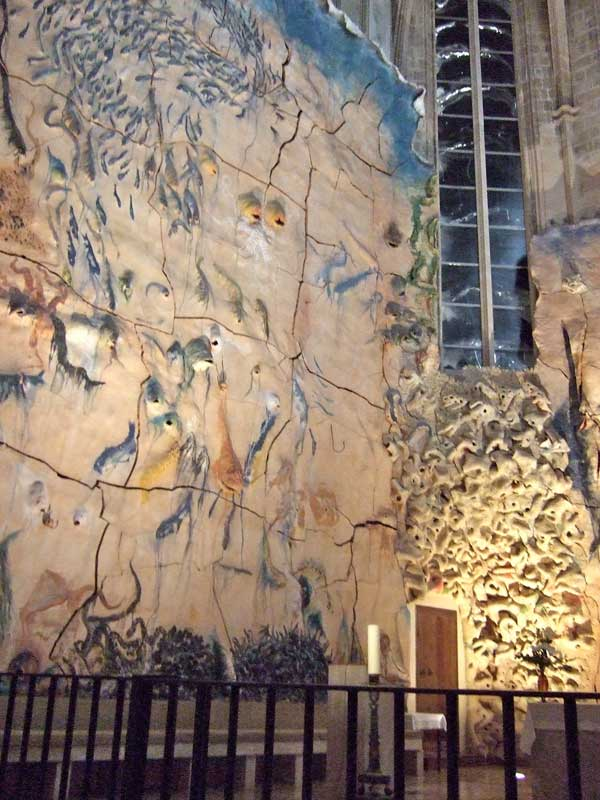
Sculpture in the cathedral La Seu, Palma, Mallorca

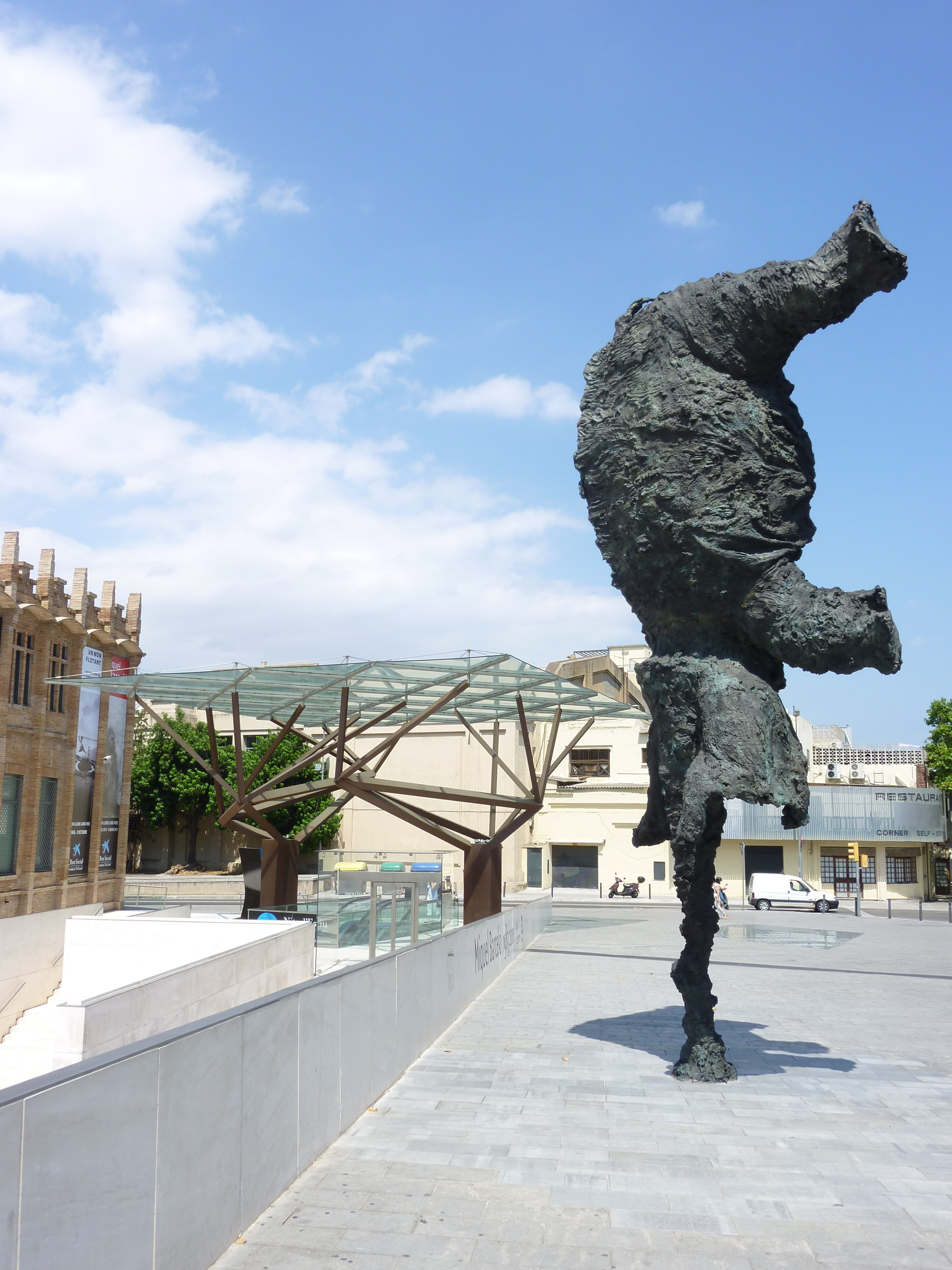
"Gran elefant dret" ("Great elephant standing") 2009, Barcelona

Barceló was born at Felanitx, Mallorca.

After having studied at the Arts and Crafts School of Palma for two years, he enrolled at the Fine Arts School of Barcelona in 1974. However, he only studied at this school for a few months. A year later he returned to Mallorca to participate in the happenings and actions of protest of the group "Taller Llunàtic", a conceptual avantgarde group. He also took part in the creation of their artist periodical Neon de Suro (21 issues from 1957 to 1982).

A year after his return to Mallorca, he had his first one-man show at the Palma Museum. Initially, the Avant-garde, Art Brut and American abstract Expressionism (e.g. Pollock had a big impact on him) influenced Barceló's work. On the other hand, he was always particularly interested in the Baroque paintings of Diego Velázquez, Tintoretto and Rembrandt. Jean Dubuffet inspired Barceló in adopting an experimental attitude.

Throughout the 1980s, he travelled extensively across Europe, the United States and West Africa – always returning to Paris which became a second home and where he set up a second studio. The time Barceló spent in different countries, his nomadism or peripatetic habits essentially influenced and inspired his work, most strongly the impressions of West Africa.

His participation at the "Documenta 7", Kassel, Germany, in 1982 gained him international recognition.

In 1983 he moved to Naples for five months. Here he realized some works made with volcanic cinder, for an exhibition at the Lucio Amelio's atelier. In this occasion he also answered the international call of the Neapolitan gallerist, after the 1980s earthquake, in which he asked the major contemporary artist of that time to create a work for the Terrae Motus collection. His work L'ombra che trema, now exhibited at the Royal Palace of Caserta, as he declared: "It's a self portrait: I made myself in the painting act. the shadow seems to reflect the other part of myself and at the same time is the destruction of the order."

In 1986 he received Spain's National Award for Plastic Arts.

In 2004 Barceló's watercolours, illustrating Dante's Divine Comedy, were shown at the Louvre Museum in Paris. For Palma Cathedral's Chapel of Sant Pere, Barceló covered the entire chapel with terracotta, decorating it with images related to the sixth chapter of the Gospel of St. John, the miracle of the multiplication of bread and fish, a theme chosen because the chapel is dedicated to the Last Supper. In 1990 he designed the costumes and stage sets for Manuel de Falla's opera El retablo de maese Pedro at the Opéra-Comique in Paris, and in 2006 at the Festival d'Avignon he was part of a performance with choreographer Joseph Nadj.

On 18 November 2008 the Spanish government officially presented Miquel Barceló's latest immense work of art in the United Nations Palace of Nations in Geneva. The work of art is a massive sculptural installation located on the domed ceiling of the building's newly created Chamber XX of Human rights and Alliance of Civilizations. The work consists of 1500 m^{2} of multi-coloured stalactite forms for which the artist used 100 tons of paint, that appear to be dripping from the ceiling.

In 2010, Barceló was invited to teach at a workshop by the École Nationale Supérieure d'Architecture de Versailles.

Barceló's work (paintings, drawings, sculptures and ceramics) is nowadays represented by Tobias Mueller Modern Art in Zürich, Galerie Bruno Bischofberger in Zürich and Acquavella Galleries in New York City.

In 2017, Miquel Barceló has been elected a vice-president of CISAC at the 2017 General Assembly in Lisbon. In 2017 he was invested Doctor Honoris Causa by the University of Salamanca, as part of the commemoration of the VIII centenary of this University.

== Exhibitions ==
- 1999: Ceramics exhibition, Museu Fundación Juan March, Palma; traveled in 2000 to Museu de Ceràmica, Barcelona
- 2011: Les Rencontres d'Arles Festival, France.

== See also ==
- Neo-expressionism
