= José María Sicilia =

Spanish abstractionist painter (born 1954)

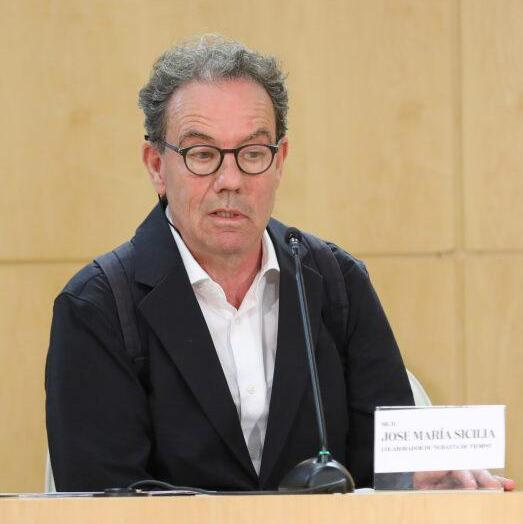

José María Sicilia (born 1954) is a Spanish abstractionist painter who currently resides in Paris and Sóller.

== Background ==
Sicilia was born in Madrid and grew up in Francoist Spain. He spent his holidays in the monastery town of Escorial near the Sierra de Guadarrama. In 1975 he joined the School of Fine Arts of San Fernando in Madrid. In 1980 he moved to Paris, where he first exhibited, and in 1985 he relocated to New York, where he became a close friend of the composer John Cage. His early work displayed an Expressionist tendency. During the 1980s he was hailed as one of the most prestigious young Spanish artists. He is known for his paintings of nature, including landscapes, insects and flowers. He has spent a large amount of time travelling in such countries as Tangier, Syria, Egypt, Morocco and India and his work is inspired by his sojourns. He is renowned for his unusual techniques such as the use of wax with lithography.

Reviewing an exhibition at the Queens Museum of Art, The New York Times noted "Jose Maria Sicilia's paintings are... refined and very seductive. His waxen surfaces create delicate plays of light and shadow. Objects appear like auras or afterimages through the translucent veneers." He has displayed at the Musee d'Art Contemporain (Bordeaux, 2001), Musee des Beaux-Arts (Caen, 2000), Venice Biennale (1986), Centro Atlantico de Arte Moderno, Gran Canaria and Mohamed Mahmoud Khalil Museum, Cairo. He also held multiple exhibitions in Japan, first in 1988, based in galleries in Nagasaki, Kyoto, Tokyo and most recently in Fukushima, in the wake of the 2011 tsunami and earthquake in the area. In 1989 he received the National Award for Plastic Arts from the Spanish Ministry of Culture.

== Collections ==
Sicilia's work can be found in the following collections:

- CAAM, Centro Atlántico de Arte Moderno, Las Palmas de Gran Canaria
- CAPC Musée d'Art Contemporain, Bourdeaux
- Centro Andaluz de Arte Contemporáneo, Sevilla
- Cincinnati Art Museum, Cincinnati, Ohio
- Colección Banco de España, Madrid
- Colección Arte Contemporáneo Fundación La Caixa, Barcelona
- Colección Comunidad de Madrid, Madrid
- Colección Fundesco, Madrid
- Collecció Testimoni de La Caixa, Barcelona
- FRAC (Fonds Régionaux d'Art Contemporani), Midi Pyrenées
- Fundació Museu d'Art Contemporani, Barcelona
- IVAM, Centre Julio González, Valencia
- Meessen De Clercq, Brussels, Belgium.
- Musée d'Art Contemporain, Toulouse
- Musée d'Art Moderne et la Création
- Museo Extremeño Iberoamericano de Arte Español Contemporáneo, Badajoz
- Museo Marugame Hirai de Arte Español Contemporáneo, Marugame
- Museo Nacional Centro de Arte Reina Sofía, Madrid
- Museo de Santa Cruz, Toledo
- Museum of Modern Art, New York
- Guggenheim, New York
