= Museo de Arte Abstracto Español =

Art museum in Cuenca, Spain

Coordinates: 40°04′41″N 2°07′43″W

The Museo de Arte Abstracto Español (Museum of Spanish Abstract Art) is a museum in Cuenca, Spain established in 1966. It has a collection of some 129 paintings, mainly by 1950s and 1960s Spanish artists.

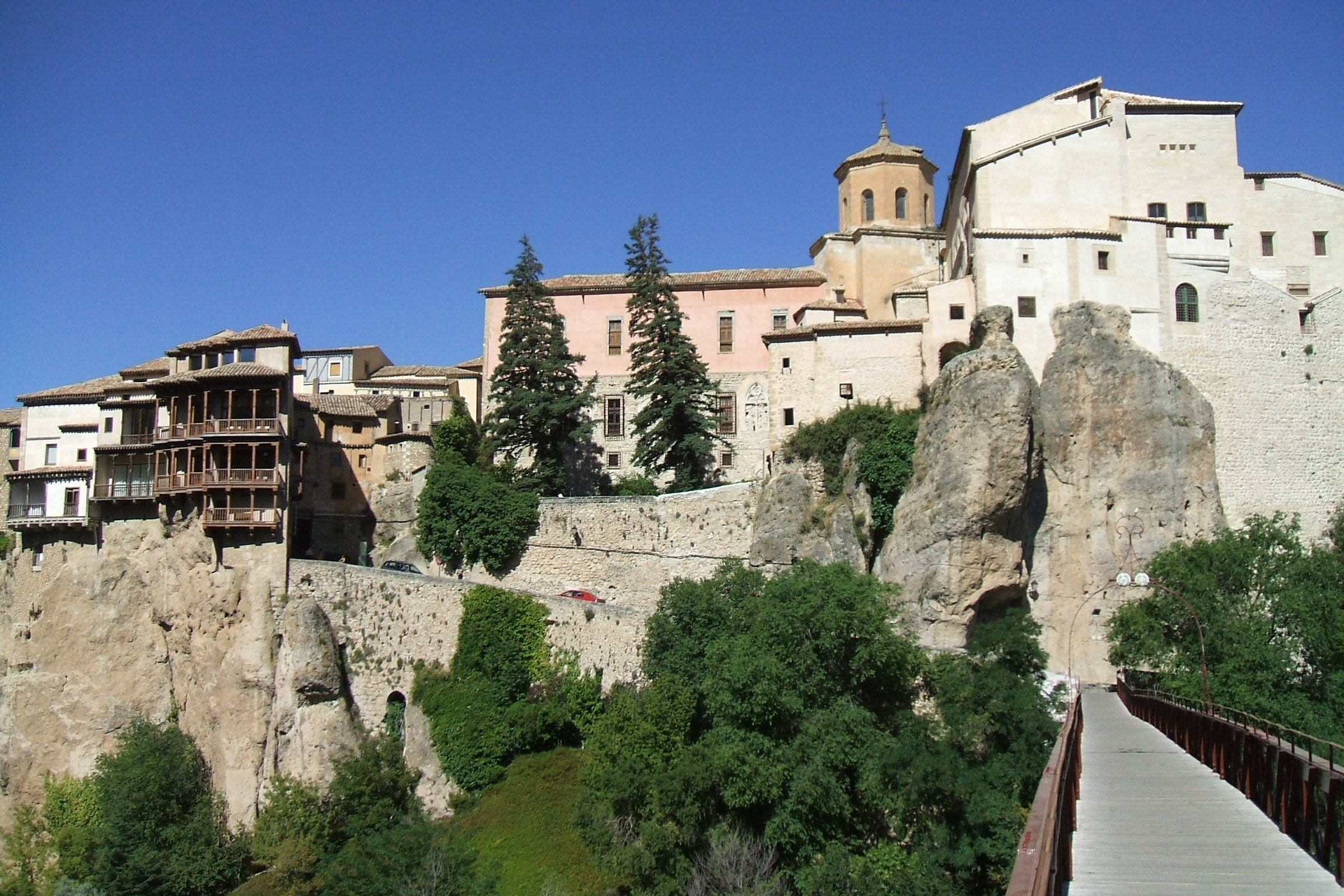
Overview of the St. Paul Bridge, which shows the Hanging Houses, home of the museum, on the left.

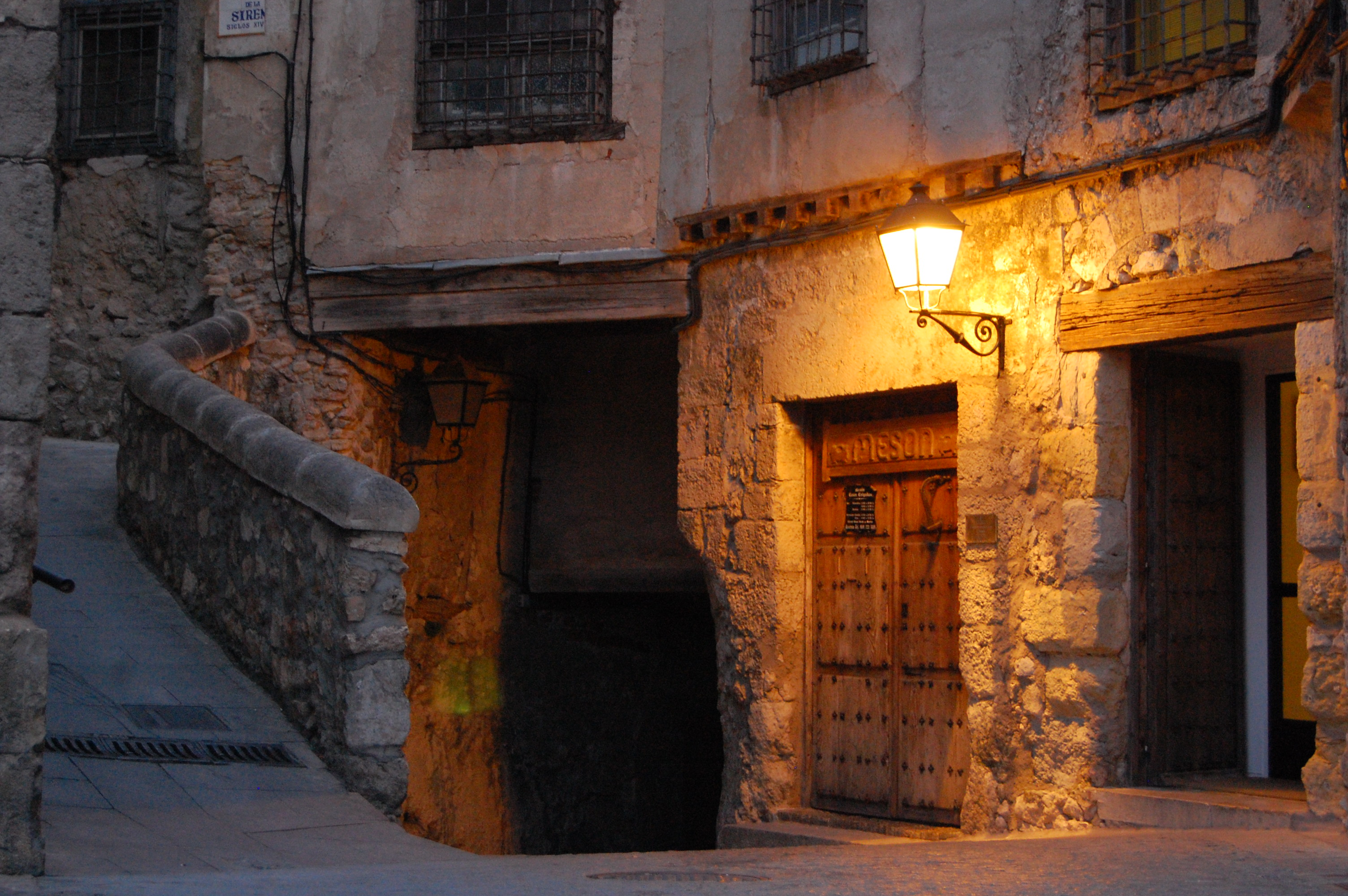
Entrance of the Spanish Abstract Art Museum (Casa del Rey) in Cuenca, next to the Casa de la Sirena.

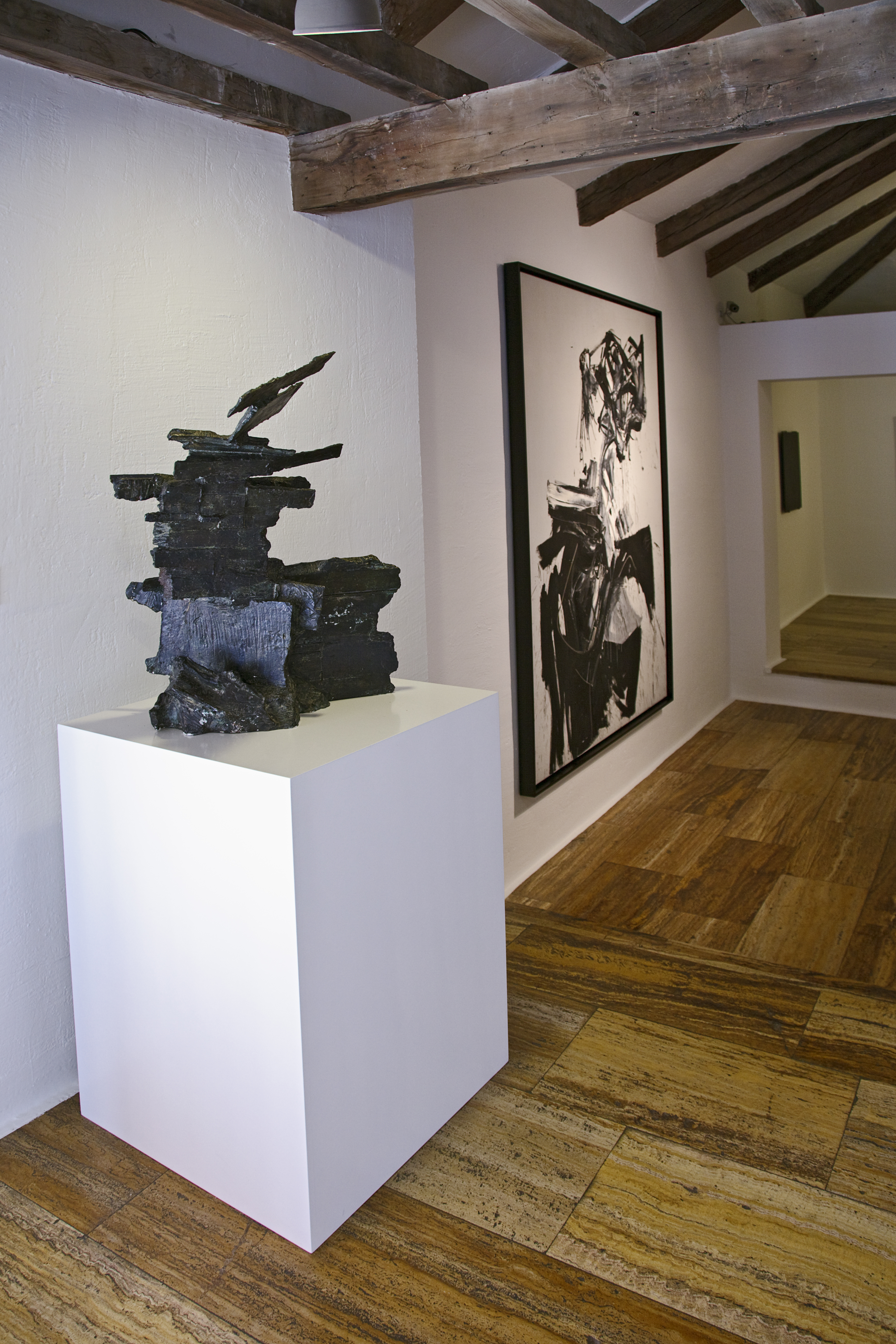
A room in the museum

== History ==
In 1961 artist Fernando Zobel began looking for a suitable location for a museum of abstract art, and in June 1963 his friend, the artist Gustavo Torner, suggested the Hanging Houses of Cuenca as an appropriate site. The building is owned by the City of Cuenca, which rented it for a symbolic amount. Restoration and renovation of the building was necessary, and was carried out by local architects Fernando Barja and Francisco Leon Meler. The Museum of Spanish Abstract Art opened on July 1, 1966, with Gerardo Rueda as curator and Zobel and Torner as co-chairmen.

The core of the new museum's collection were a dozen sculptures and a hundred paintings which Zoebel had previous collected, something less than half of which were initially exhibited, with the intent of rotating the permanent exhibition. With a focus on quality rather than quantity, and not attempting to host an exhaustive survey of Spanish abstract art, the Museum does not encourage gifts of works they would not otherwise have chosen.

In 1978, the museum expanded under the direction of architect Barja, reopening on November 28 of that year.

Two years later, in 1980, Zobel donated the museum's collection to the Juan March Foundation, which added it to its own collection, and took over the management and finances of the museum. That same year, the museum received the Gold Medal for Merit in Fine Arts from the Spanish Ministry of Culture. It also received the European Museum of the Year Award, given by the European Council in 1981, Castilla-La Mancha's Medal of Honor in 1991 and its "Tourism" Award in 1997.

Further physical improvements in 1994 provided a special room for temporary exhibitions, and the museum continued to expand its collection – including the donation by Zobel of over 3,000 specialized books. It now has 1,500 works in its collections, of which 515 are painting or sculptures. An average of 40,000 people visit the museum each year.

== Artists in the permanent collection ==
- Rodrigo Antonio Calistro Díaz
- Joaquín Rubio Camín
- Rafael Canogar
- Eduardo Chillida
- Martín Chirino
- Modest Cuixart
- Guillermo Delgado
- Francisco Farreras
- Luis Feito
- Amadeo Gabino
- José Guerrero
- Joan Hernández Pijuan
- Antonio Lorenzo
- César Manrique
- Manuel Millares Sall
- Manuel Hernández Mompó
- Lucio Muñoz
- Jorge Oteiza
- Pablo Palazuelo
- Manuel Rivera
- Gerardo Rueda
- Antonio Saura
- Eusebio Sempere
- Pablo Serrano
- Antoni Tàpies
- Jordi Teixidor
- Gustavo Torner
- Manuel Viola
- José María Yturralde
- Fernando Zobel

== See also ==
- Equipo Crónica
- El Paso (grupo)
- Grupo Simancas
