= Institut Valencià d'Art Modern =

Institut Valencià d'Art Modern (IVAM)
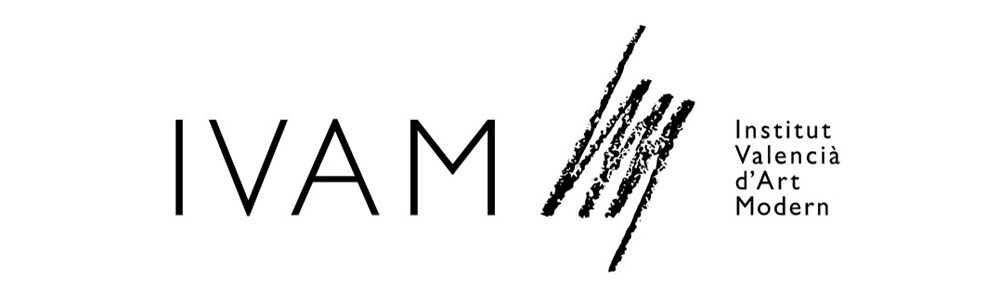

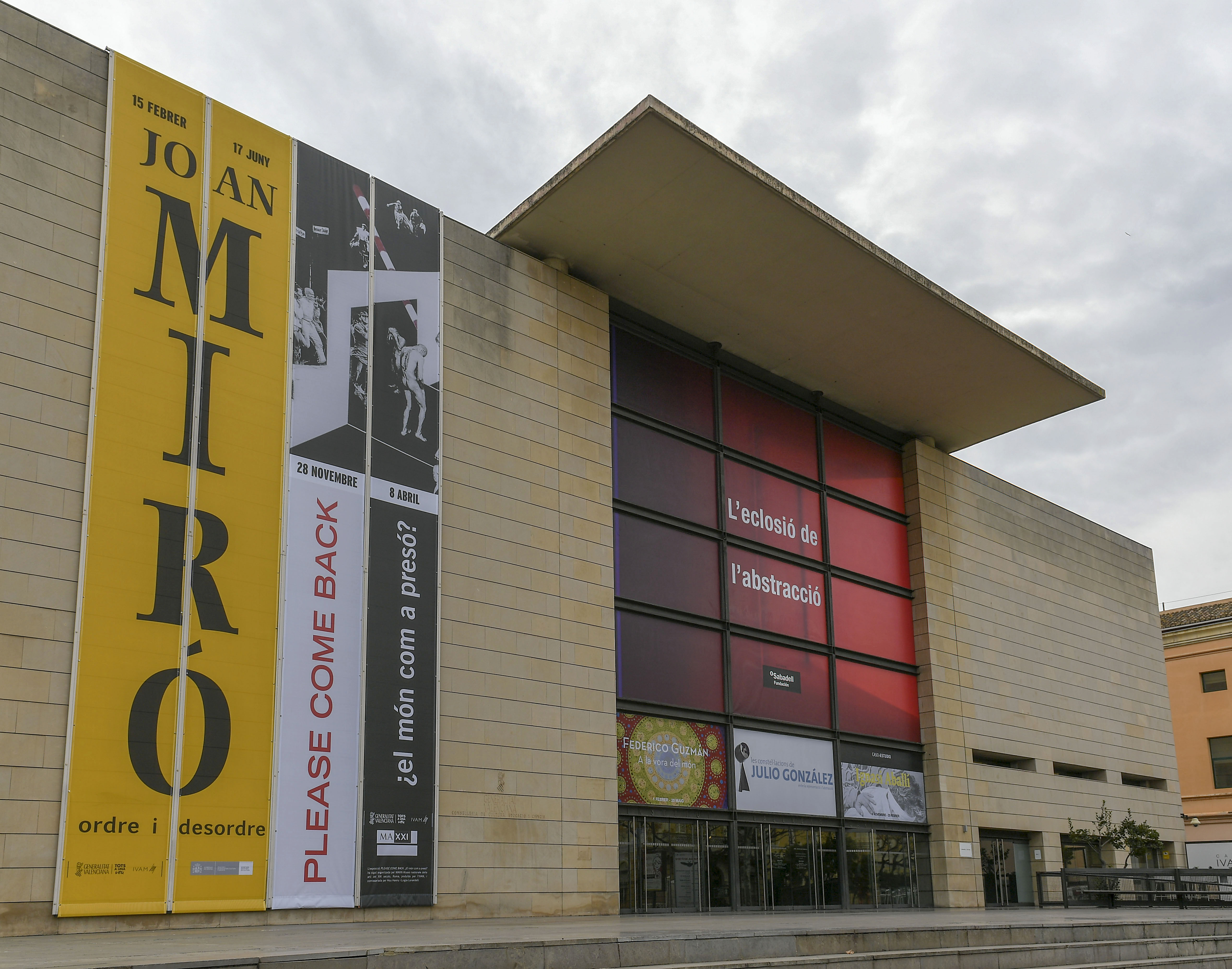
- Interactive fullscreen map
- Established: 1989
- Location: Guillem de Castro, 118 46003, València
- Coordinates: 39°28′48″N 0°22′58″W
- Type: Art museum
- Director: Blanca de la Torre
- Website: www.ivam.es/en

The Institut Valencià d'Art Modern (Valencian pronunciation: [instiˈtud valensiˈa ˈðaɾd moˈðɛɾn]; Spanish: Instituto Valenciano de Arte Moderno; English: "Valencian Institute of Modern Art"), also known by the acronym IVAM, was the first center of modern art in Spain, opening in 1989 in the city of Valencia. The Institut Valencià d'Art Modern is an important center for modern and contemporary art in Spain and Europe. Nuria Enguita Mayo was the Director of the museum between September 2020 and February 2024. Blanca de la Torre is the new director starting April 2025.

== History ==
The museum officially opened in February, 1989. Before that date, the Ministry of Culture of the Generalitat Valenciana had been working on the collection even before the building was built. In 1986, the Valencian Government created the Institute, with Tomàs Llorens as its first director. It was the first Modern Arts Museum in Spain, with two buildings: the main in Guillem de Castro street and a close location in the Centre del Carme, active until 2002.

The core of the Museum's collection was made-up by the Julio González collection, acquired before the opening.

== Programming ==
The museum shows continuous developments of art and photography of the twentieth century. It offers both a 10,000-strong permanent collection, and temporary exhibitions, discussions, courses and conferences, workshops and concerts related to exhibitions organized and other fields of contemporary art. It has two spaces: the Centre Julio González, a new building which opened in 1989 featuring the museum's collection along with other temporary signs and the Board of the Wall, located in the basement of the building that remains of the former Medieval fortifications of the city, and now houses temporary exhibitions.

Jointly organized with the San Diego Museum of Art, IVAM mounted a major exhibition on Joaquín Sorolla in its first year, culling paintings from collections throughout Europe and the United States.

== Management ==
IVAM is run by the Ministry of Culture, Education, and Sports of the Valencian Community. Since 2014 to 2020, José Miguel García Cortés had been the museum's director. His predecessor, Consuelo Císcar, was ousted after ten years at the post, following complaints from local critics, visual artists and gallery owners about the low quality of the museum's programming and "lack of professionalism in the management".

After six years in chief, José Miguel Garcia Cortés left the Direction in September 2020. Nuria Enguita Mayo took over right away after an international selection process as the institution's new director. "Enguita has been brought on board to conduct a major internationalization project at the institution whose core will focus in a detailed work on the museum collections, the importance of research and participation along with an enhancement on the public–private collaboration and the educational activities undertaken by the Valencian institution". She resigned in February 2024 due to the "lack of support" of the Government. Blanca de la Torre is the new director starting April 2025
