= Juana Mordó =

Spanish art dealer and gallerist

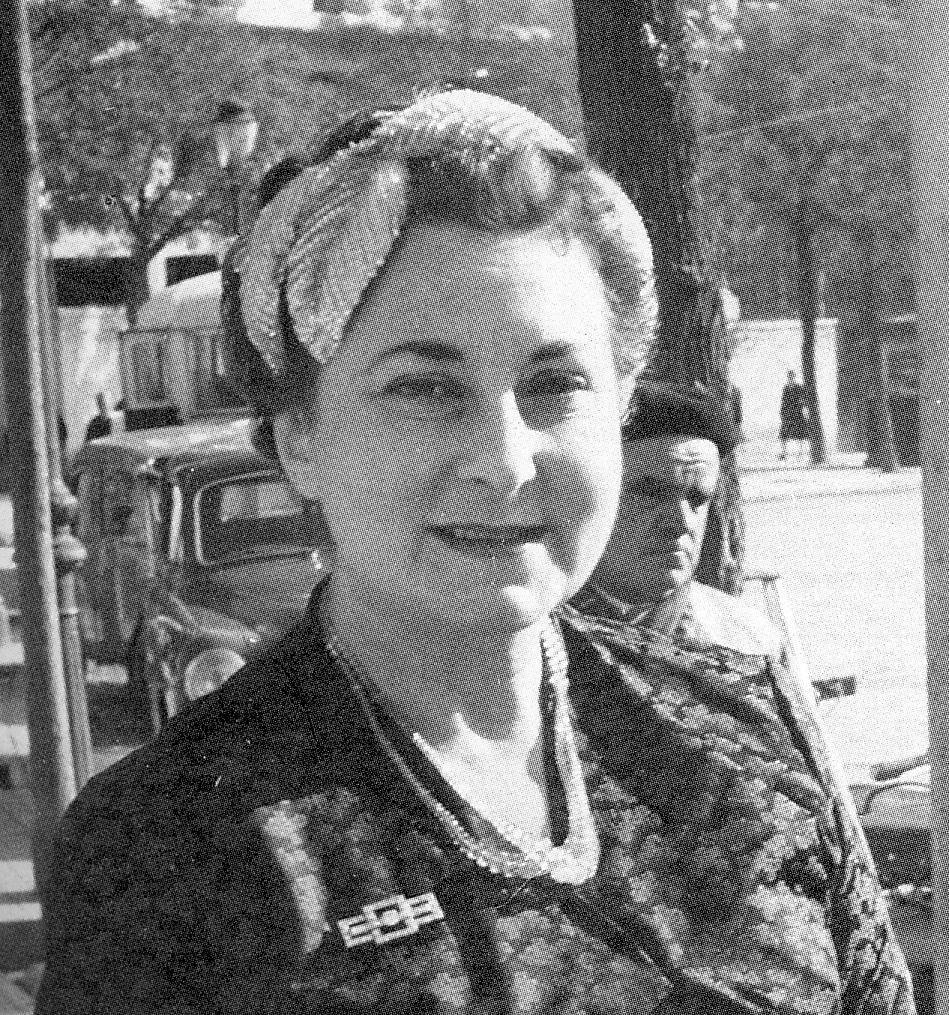
- Juana Mordó in 1955
- Born: Juana Naar Scialom; April 26, 1899; Thessaloniki, Salonica Vilayet, Ottoman Empire
- Died: March 12, 1984 (aged 84); Madrid, Spain

Juana Mordó (April 26, 1899 – March 12, 1984) was born in Thessaloniki, Ottoman Empire (now Greece) and was an art dealer and gallery director in Madrid, Spain.

== Early years ==
Juana Naar Scialom was born in Salonica, then part of the Ottoman Empire and today in Greece, on April 26, 1899. Daughter of Elise Scialom and León Naar, of Sephardic descent, she moved to Paris with her family.

Mordó's first marriage was to Albert Yacoel, who worked in the textile trade in Paris. The marriage ended, and at the end of the 1920s, she married Enrique Mordó. She moved to Berlin, with her second husband who ran an import and export business of oriental rugs.

She lived in Berlin during the rise of Nazi power. Mordó, a Spanish passport holder, decided to leave for Switzerland with her husband shortly before the start of World War II.

== Arrival in Madrid ==
In 1942, Enrique Mordó died of heart failure in Switzerland. By 1943, Mordó decided to move to Madrid with her mother. Shortly after their arrival her mother, Elise Scialom died and Mordó decided to continue living in Madrid.

A friend from Berlin who worked in intellectual media, put Mordó in touch with contacts. She obtained work on the French RNE broadcast, reading her articles and signed them with the pseudonym Carmen Soler. The first of these collaborations was an interview with Spanish novelist, essayist and literary critic, Azorín. Other interviews and works on various topics would follow including travel, visits to Spanish cities, literary, social, and festive themes, all announced with her signature greeting, "Mes chers auditeurs".

== The "salons" of Juana ==
Throughout the years, the image of Mordó has achieved great prestige in the cultural world of Madrid. In a desire to animate the intellectual environment of Madrid, Mordó summoned writers and artists on Saturdays to her home on Rodriguez de San Pedro Street. These meetings became known as the "salons" of Juana. Mordó's friends, José Luis López Aranguren, Dionisio Ridruejo, Pedro Laín Entralgo, Luis Felipe Vivanco, Antonio Tovar, Rodrigo Uría González, Luis Rosales, José Luis Sampedro, Pedro Mourlane Michelena, Antonio de Zubiaurre, Gerardo Diego, Antonio Saura, Carlos Saura were among the attendees.

== Introduction into the art world ==
In the Autumn of 1953, the first International Outdoor Sculpture Exhibition was inaugurated in the Retiro Park, which promoted the General Direction of Fine Arts and the Society of Friends of the Landscape and the Gardens. Mordó joined the organizing committee as the Secretary that was chaired by Antonio Gallego Burín, the general director of Fine Arts, with vice-president Joan Ainaud de Lasarte, the director of the Museums of Barcelona, José Luis Fernández del Amo, the director of the Museum of Contemporary Art.

In addition to Secretary of the organizing committee of the exhibition, Mordó, was the time coordinator. In this role, Mordó managed numerous details to facilitate the realization of the project which culminated in the assembly of the works. Through this project she built a wealth knowledge and experience about mounting an exhibition.

== Director of the Biosca Gallery ==
In 1958, the gallery owner Aurelio Biosca was looking for someone to run his gallery and met Mordó. The gallery showcased artists of El Paso and the generation of the great Spanish informalism in which Mordó curated some very influential exhibitions.

== Juana Mordó Gallery ==
Encouragement from Mordó's artist friends and colleagues gave her the confidence to open her own gallery. Mordó formed the gallery with Ernesto Wuthenow, María Luisa Maristany and José Ayllón.

The Juana Mordó gallery was located on Villanueva Street No. 7, and opened on March 14, 1964. It was inaugurated with a group exhibition of artists: Vicente Ameztoy, Amalia Avia, Jaime Burguillos, José Caballero, Rafael Canogar, Eduardo Chillida, Enrique Gran, José Guerrero, Carmen Laffón, Antonio Lopez Garcia, Julio Lopez Hernandez, Francisco Lozano, Manolo Millares, Manuel Hernández Mompó, Lucio Muñoz, Gaston Orellana, Alejandro Kingdom, Manuel Rivera, Juan de Ribera Berenguer, Luis Sáez, Antonio Saura, Eusebio Sempere, Pablo Serrano, Antonio Suarez, Antoni Tapies, Gustavo Torner and Fernando Zobe. In December 1975, with Manuel Mendoza, Mordó opened a new gallery on Calle Castelló, number 7. In the late 1960s Mordó started a long-term collaboration and friendship with the gallery owner Margarete Lauter in Mannheim. Thanks to this cooperation, Lauter was able to give Spanish contemporary art a platform in Germany.

== Death and legacy ==
On June 27, 1983, King Juan Carlos presented Mordó with the Gold Medal of the Fine Arts at the Prado Museum. A few months later she died in Madrid on March 12, 1984.

Mordó was an influential gallery owner and defender of avant-garde art, promoting painters and sculptors of the time. From Mordó's collection, multiple works have come to public institutions. Mordó's legacy is part of the artistic heritage of the Círculo de Bellas Artes of Madrid and it is composed mostly of works of unquestionable artistic value and many of the pieces are accompanied by affectionate dedications because they were gifts that artists created for a special event, such as the founding artist of Grupo El Paso, Manuel Rivera. Her archive was given to the Museo Nacional Centro de Arte Reina Sofía in Madrid.

Additional acquisitions (legacy Mordó-Alvear) arrived at the San Fernando Academy including 57 pieces by authors such as Rafael Canogar, Gustavo Torner, Bonifacio Alfonso and an engraved plate by Dalí.

== Bibliography ==
- GALLEGO, Joaquín, Juana Mordó
- VV. AA., Juana Mordó for Art, Circle of BBAA, 1985. ISBN 84-86418-01-1
- VV. AA., Madrid Art of the 60, Community of Madrid-Ministry of Culture-General Directorate of Cultural Heritage, Madrid, 1990. ISBN 84-451-0197-8
- VV.AA., Juana Mordó: her legacy, Madrid, 1997. ISBN 84-451-1320-8
- Abre el ojo (Open eye)
