= Carmen Laffón =

Spanish figurative painter and sculptor (1934–2021)

The Most Excellent Carmen Laffón
- Born: María del Carmen Laffón de la Escosura; 8 October 1934; Seville, Spain
- Died: 7 November 2021 (aged 87); Sanlúcar de Barrameda, Spain
- Education: Real Academia de Bellas Artes de San Fernando
- Occupations: Painter, sculptor
- Organization: Real Academia de Bellas Artes de San Fernando
- Awards: National Award for Plastic Arts (1982); Gold Medal of Merit in the Fine Arts (1999); Grand Cross of the Civil Order of Alfonso X, the Wise (2017)

María del Carmen Laffón de la Escosura (8 October 1934 – 7 November 2021) was a Spanish figurative painter and sculptor. She was a member of the Real Academia de Bellas Artes de San Fernando from 1998 until her death, and received numerous awards and honours, such as the Grand Cross of the Civil Order of Alfonso X, the Wise in 2017.

== Biography ==
Carmen Laffón was born in Seville in 1934, into a cultured, progressive, and well-off family. Her parents, who had met at the Residencia de Estudiantes in Madrid, decided not to send her to school. Her education took place in their home, where various teachers visited.

Her introduction to painting took place at age 12 under the guidance of Manuel González Santos, a friend of the family and her father's former drawing teacher. At his recommendation she entered the School of Fine Arts in Seville at age 15. After studying at this institution for three years, she moved to Madrid, where she finished her training at the Real Academia de Bellas Artes. In 1954, she made her final study trip to Paris, where she was especially impressed by the work of Marc Chagall. The following year she had a study residency in Rome with a grant from the Ministry of Education. Her trips to Vienna and the Netherlands were also important milestones in those years.

On her return to Seville in 1956, she continued painting at the family summer house in La Jara, facing Doñana National Park, which would end up being the center of her artistic activity. In the next two years she held her first two solo exhibitions, one at the Ateneo de Madrid and the other at the Club La Rábida in Seville. From 1960 to 1962 she lived in Madrid. In 1961 she met Juana Mordó, who was keenly interested in her work and offered her a contract with the Biosca Gallery. The relationship with Mordó would continue later when she set up her own gallery. The group of artists working for Mordó included many of the most prominent names in Spanish painting of the time: Manolo Millares, Antonio Saura, José Luis Mauri, Lucio Muñoz, Eusebio Sempere, Manuel Hernández Mompó, Pablo Palazuelo, Gustavo Torner, Fernando Zóbel, and Antonio López. Carmen Laffón's painting style was enormously different from the abstraction that prevailed in the creative circles of Spain at that time, in which Mordó's artists had a preponderant position.

In 1962 she returned to Seville but continued her relationship with Juana Mordó. With the creation of the school El Taller in 1967, together with Teresa Duclós and José Soto, Carmen Laffón approached the world of artistic education, to which she would return years later when she joined the School of Fine Arts of Seville's Chair of Natural Drawing in 1975, where she would remain until 1981. In 1982 she received the National Award for Plastic Arts.

In 1998, she was named an academic of the Real Academia de Bellas Artes de San Fernando in Madrid. On 16 January 2000, she gave its entrance speech entitled Visión de un paisaje (Vision of a Landscape), which dealt with her relationship with Sanlúcar de Barrameda and Doñana National Park.

The Guadalquivir is the river of Seville, my city of birth, that takes me to Sanlúcar de Barrameda, my other city, where I began to paint and to dream.

In 2006 she exhibited her work La Viña in the crypt of the cloister of the Silos Abbey, inspired by the vineyard that she cares for like a garden at her residence in La Jara. This exhibition consisted of an oil painting paying homage to Santo Domingo, large-format drawings on the landscape of the Santa Adela vineyard in La Jara, and others around the theme of the vineyard and the vintage, as well as a plaster sculpture, later acquired by the Museo Reina Sofía, and 18 baskets of bronze in clear reference to the tasks of the grape harvest.

Laffón died on the morning of 7 November 2021, at the age of 87.

== Works ==
In 1992, an exhaustive retrospective exhibition of Laffón's work took place at the Museo Reina Sofía in Madrid, covering almost the entirety of her artistic career. Her work, made mainly with the techniques of charcoal, pastel, and oil, includes portraits (including two of King Juan Carlos and Queen Sofía), still lifes, everyday objects, and especially landscapes. Since the mid-90s, Laffón has also worked in sculpture.

=== Museums with works by Carmen Laffón ===
- Fundación Mapfre
- Bank of Spain Collection
- Bank of Santander Collection
- Museo de Arte Abstracto Español
- 20th Century Art Collection, Eusebio Sempere donation, Alicante
- Fundación Juan March
- Metropolitan Museum of Art, New York
- Meadows Museum, Dallas
- Museo Nacional Centro de Arte Reina Sofía
- Fundación Aena
- Caja de Burgos
- Fundación Casa de la Moneda, Madrid
- Museo ICO Collections (MUICO), Madrid
- Museo de Jaén
- Centro Andaluz de Arte Contemporáneo, Seville

=== Expositions ===
- Ateneo de Madrid, 1957
- Sala Biosca, Madrid, 1961
- Galería La Pasarela, Seville, 1966
- Galería Juana Mordó, Madrid, 1967
- Juana de Aizpuru Gallery, Seville, 1978
- Galería Maese Nicolás, León, 1980
- Museo Nacional Reina Sofía, 1992
- Fundación Focus retrospective exposition, 1995
- Museo Casa de la Moneda, 2000
- 12 Artists in the Museo del Prado, May–June 2007

== Awards and recognitions ==
- National Award for Plastic Arts, 1982
- Silver Medal of Andalusia, 1988
- Gold Medal of Merit in the Fine Arts, 1999
- Tomás Francisco Prieto Award, 1999
- Culture Award of the Community of Madrid, 2012
- Favorite Daughter of Andalusia, 2013
- Manuel Clavero Award, 2016
- Grand Cross of the Civil Order of Alfonso X, the Wise, 2017
