= Helga de Alvear =

German-Spanish art collector (1936–2025)

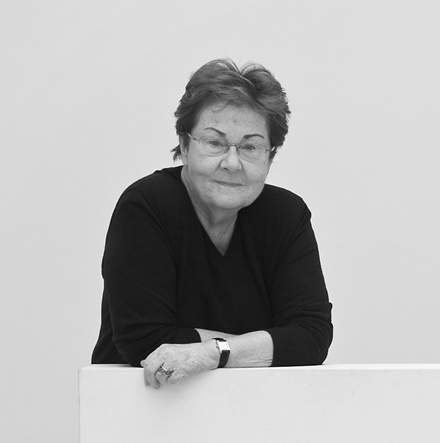
- Alvear in 2010
- Born: Helga Müller Schätzel; 1936; Kirn, Germany
- Died: 2 February 2025 (aged 88); Madrid, Spain
- Organizations: Galería Helga de Alvear; Museum of Contemporary Art Helga de Alvear
- Spouse: Jaime de Alvear (m. 1959)
- Children: 3
- Awards: Medal of Extremadura; Gold Medal of Merit in the Fine Arts
- Website: helgadealvear.com/en/

Helga de Alvear (née Müller Schätzel, 1936 – 2 February 2025) was a German-Spanish art collector and dealer of contemporary art. Living in Madrid from 1959, where she had personal contact to the art scene, she began to collect contemporary art by Spanish and international artists in 1967, over decades more than 3000 works by more than 500 artists. She opened her own gallery, Galería Helga de Alvear, in 1995. In 2006, she began to share her collection with the public in a foundation with the Government of Extremadura. A museum in a house in the historic district of Cáceres opened in 2010. A new annex expanding it was built from 2015 and opened in 2021. The museum, then called Museum of Contemporary Art Helga de Alvear, displays around 5% of her collection.

== Background ==
Helga Müller Schätzel was born in Kirn, Germany (now in Rhineland-Palatinate), in 1936. She attended the Salem boarding school near Lake Constance, and subsequently studied in Lausanne and Geneva to learn French. She furthered her studies afterwards in London for a year. In 1957, she travelled to Spain to learn Spanish; she met the architect Jaime de Alvear there. They married in 1959 and took residence in Madrid.

== Career ==
=== Beginnings ===
Her husband introduced de Alvear to the Madrid art scene. In 1967 de Alvear met the art dealer Juana Mordó at a private gathering, who became her close friend. De Alvear began to collect art. During the Franco regime, she met artists from the Cuenca group around Gerardo Rueda and from the El Paso group. In January 1980, she started working at the Juana Mordó Gallery where she honed her knowledge about the international art scene. Subsequently, she was involved in establishing an international art fair, ARCO, in 1982, which increased Spain's involvement in the international contemporary art scene. When Mordó died in 1984, she took over the gallery and over the next 10 years, continued following in the artistic and professional footsteps of her mentor.

=== Galería Helga de Alvear ===
In 1995, De Alvear opened her own gallery under her name in a space measuring more than 900 square meters next to the Reina Sofía Museum. Many of her projects championed international contemporary art with a special emphasis on photography, video and installation, at a time when these mediums were practically unknown in Spain. Her gallery was one of the best-established and longest-running art galleries on the Spanish scene and has earned international acclaim. The gallery has presented works from artists including Angela Bulloch, Thomas Demand, Elmgreen & Dragset Axel Hütte, Isaac Julien, Imi Knoebel, Karin Sander and Santiago Sierra.

=== Museum of Contemporary Art Helga de Alvear ===
De Alvear's collection, including more than 3,000 pieces by Spanish and international artists, became part of the Fundación Helga de Alvear in 2006, in a joint initiative with the Regional Government of Extremadura. The first phase of the Fundación Helga de Alvear Visual Arts Centre, based in an early 20th-century building known as Casa Grande, opened in the historic quarter of Cáceres in 2010.

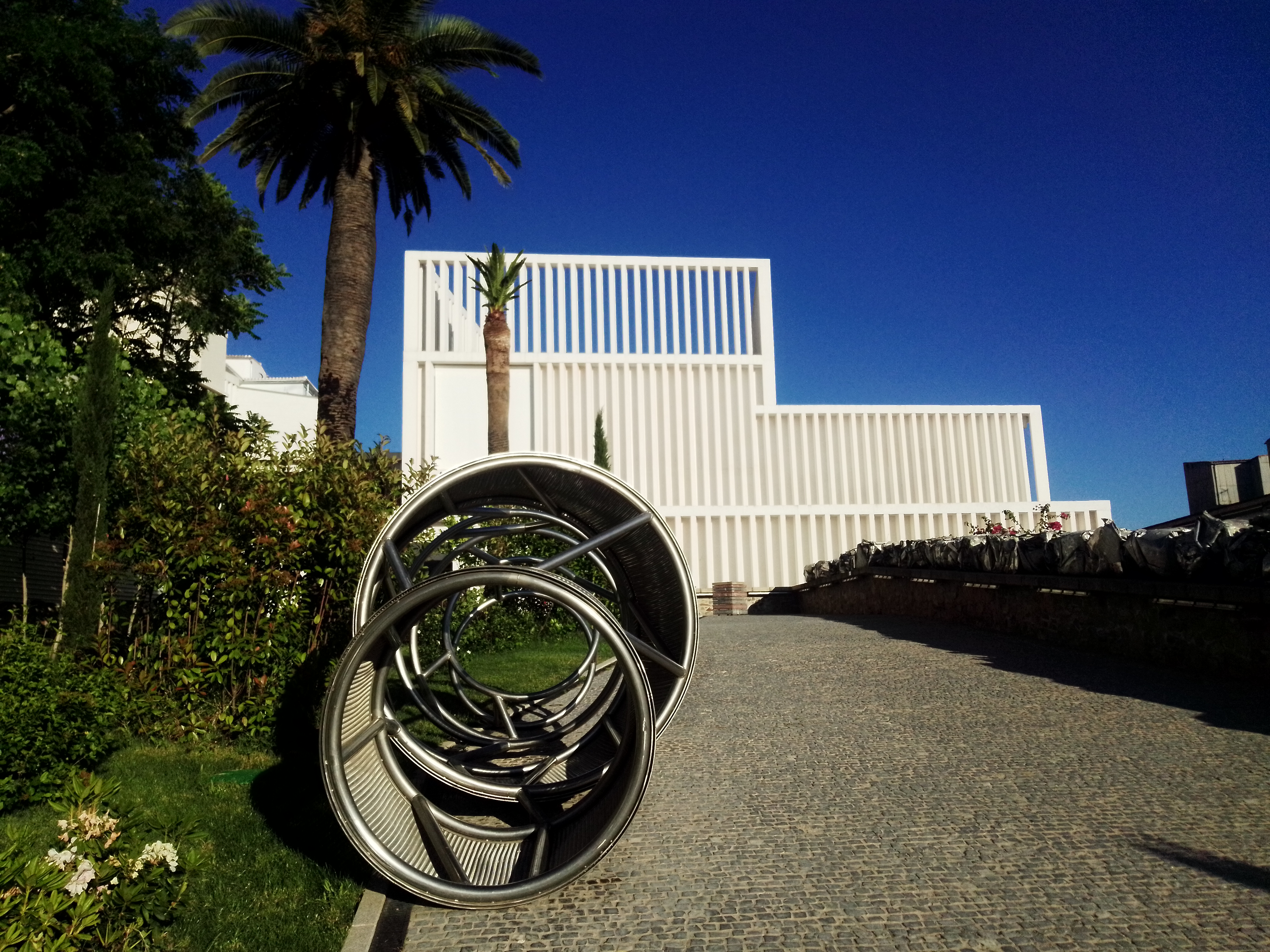
Annex of the museum in Cáceres

In 2015, Spanish architects Mansilla + Tuñón Architects built a 8,000 sq. m. annexe building, inaugurated on 25 February 2021. The name of the museum was then changed to Museum of Contemporary Art Helga de Alvear. The cost of the new museum was around €10 million with half of the funds coming from de Alvear and half from institutions in Extremadura. The mission of the collection is also to contribute to public awareness about art, and it often lends out works to institutions around the world. In addition, it has been the subject of a number of in-depth exhibitions. As of 2021, the Museum presents a selection of around 200 works, around 5% of de Alvear's collection, including paintings, sculptures, photographs, video art, drawings and installations by more than 500 international artists. The semi-permanent exhibition allows the public to explore works by Josef Albers, Joseph Beuys, Dan Flavin, Nan Goldin, Jenny Holzer, Anish Kapoor, Paul Klee, Gordon Matta-Clark and Philippe Parreno. It also houses artworks by Louise Bourgeois, Kandinsky, Carmen Laffón, Robert Motherwell, Picasso, Tàpies, and Ai Weiwei, among others. In addition, the museum has an outdoor garden featuring a sculpture of a hundred-year-old olive tree by Ugo Rondinone, and is connected to the facilities of the former Helga de Alvear Visual Arts Centre in the refurbished Casa Grande.

== Personal life and other activities ==
De Alvear was married to Jaime de Alvear from 1959. The couple lived in Madrid and had three children, Maria, Ana and Patricia.

Amid the COVID-19 pandemic in Spain, de Alvear donated €1 million (about $1.1 million) to research for a vaccine. The funds were directed toward scientific work conducted by Luis Enjuanes, a virologist for the Spanish National Research Council (CSIC).

De Alvear died in Madrid on 2 February 2025, at the age of 88.

== Recognitions ==
De Alvear was awarded the Medal of Extremadura in 2007, the Gold Medal of Merit in the Fine Arts bestowed by the Spanish Ministry of Culture in 2008, the Medal of Cáceres in 2011 and Fundación Arte y Mecenazgo Award in the category of Collector in 2012, among other recognitions. She was awarded the Medalla Internacional de las Artes from Madrid in 2020.
