= Ateneo de Madrid =

- Ateneo de Madrid (Spanish)
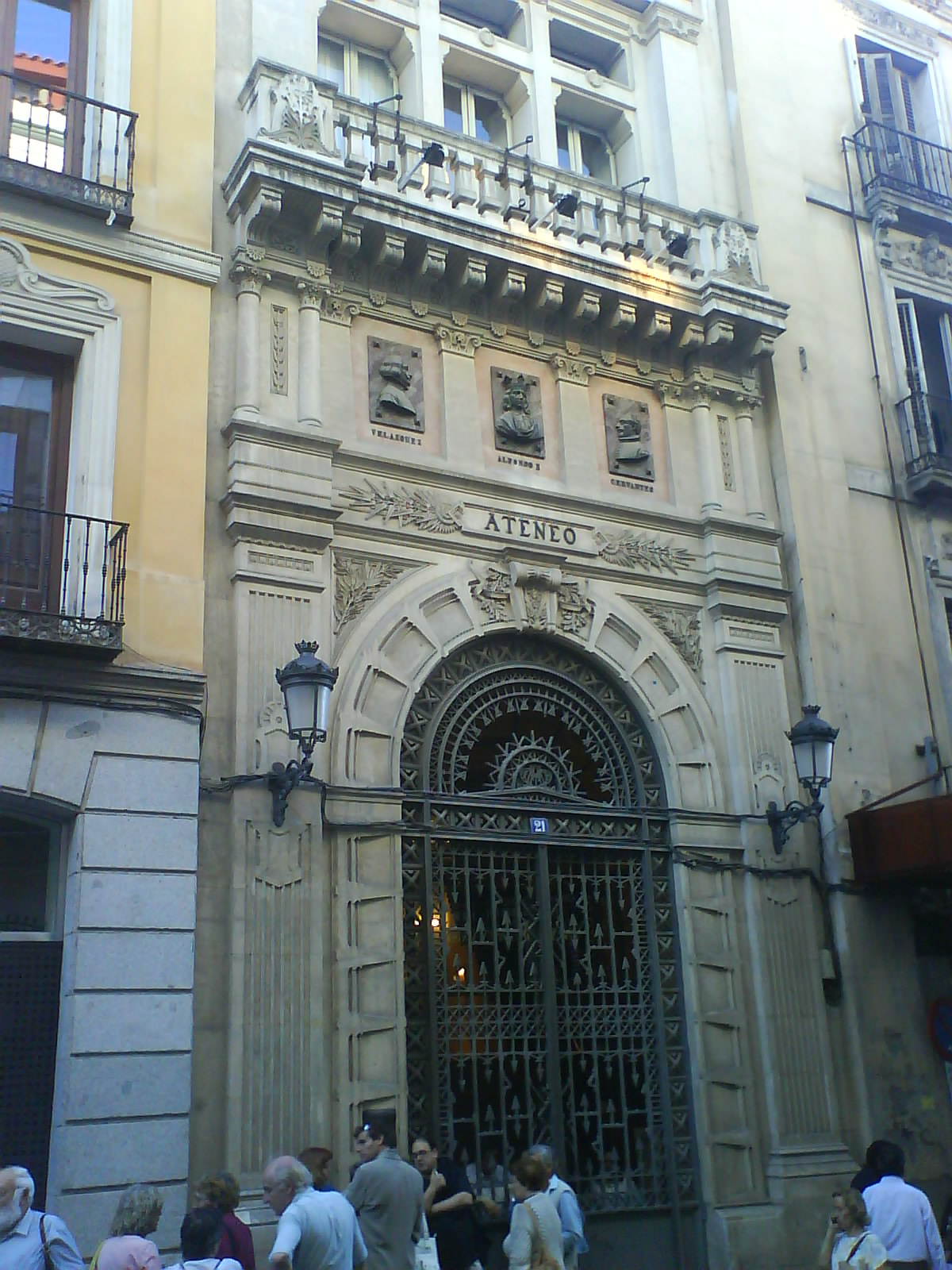
- Façade of the Athenæum of Madrid, on Prado Street.

- Location within Spain
- 40.415040°N 3.698251°W
- Location: Madrid, Spain

Spanish Cultural Heritage
- Official name: Ateneo de Madrid
- Type: Non-movable
- Criteria: Monument
- Designated: 1992
- Reference no.: RI-51-0006878

The Ateneo de Madrid ("Athenæum of Madrid") is a private cultural institution located in the capital of Spain that was founded in 1835. Its full name is Ateneo Científico, Literario y Artístico de Madrid ("Scientific, Literary and Artistic Athenæum of Madrid").

== History ==
The roots of the Athenæum trace to the ideals of Francophiles and liberals of the early 19th century. After the Napoleonic invasion of Spain, the Afrancesado, who had joined the French cause and supported Joseph Bonaparte as king of Spain, were exiled with him upon the triumph of the Supreme Central Junta and the Cortes of Cádiz, which enacted in 1812 the first Spanish liberal constitution.

The restoration of Ferdinand VII in 1814 after the previous year's Treaty of Valençay, however, brought a return to absolutism and the flight of the Spanish patriots of Cádiz. Much of the enlightened aristocracy, that for one reason or another had been persecuted in Spain, took refuge in France and England.

The return of the exiles during the "liberal triennium" from 1820 to 1823 allowed the creation of the Spanish Athenæum, directed by Juan Manuel de los Rios. When King Ferdinand reasserted his absolutism in 1823, however, that institution's scholars went into London exile.

Ferdinand's death in 1833, an amnesty the following year, and the support of liberals for the cause of Isabella II, still a child, over that of the pretender Don Carlos, her uncle, created a new atmosphere of tolerance during the regency of Ferdinand's widow Maria Christina.

In 1835 the former Spanish Ateneo of 1820 was reborn as the Ateneo Científico y Literario de Madrid under the patronage of Salustiano Olózaga, Ángel de Saavedra, Antonio Alcalá Galiano, Ramón de Mesonero Romanos, Francisco López Olavarrieta, Francisco Fabra and Juan Manuel de los Rios.

In 1923 the dictatorship of Primo de Rivera suspended the activities of the Ateneo.

During the Spanish Civil War from 1936 to 1939, the Ateneo remained open and managed to preserve the integrity of its facilities, especially its library, thanks to the work of Bernardo G. de Candamo, the only member of the Republican governing council to remain in Madrid during the war. Although the 36-year Spanish State of General Franco subsumed the Ateneo to the ideological goals of his Falange party, the subsequent transition to democracy has enabled it to regain its position as a centre of culture of the first order.

In 2013, the severe reduction of the grants from the city of Madrid under the 2008–2012 Spanish financial crisis threatened bankruptcy for the Ateneo. The Ateneo council tried to cover the losses by auctioning works of art, either donated by sympathetic artists or part of the historic heritage. The Regional Heritage Council of Madrid forbade the sale of an 1855 collection of engravings (The Disasters of War and Los Caprichos) by Francisco de Goya. What the regional council allowed to auction includes 14 works by Antonio López, Eusebio Sempere, Josep Guinovart, José Moreno Villa, Alberto Corazón and Carmen Laffon, that earned the Ateneo 140,000 euros.

== Office and membership ==
The Athenæum's first home was in the Palacio de Abrantès, but it is currently housed at 21 Prado Street (not to be confused with the Paseo del Prado) in Madrid — a modernist building opened by Antonio Cánovas del Castillo in 1884. The building, designed by architects Enrique Fort and Luis de Landecho, is adorned with Greek Revival paintings by Arturo Mélida. It has an auditorium, work room, classrooms, exhibition hall, library and archive. The Ateneo has 19 sections that are active in multiple cultural and scientific arenas.

Prominent Spaniards — including Laureano Figuerola, Segismundo Moret, Gumersindo de Azcárate, Antonio Alcalá Galiano, Antonio Cánovas del Castillo, Miguel de Unamuno, Fernando de los Ríos and Manuel Azaña — have served as presidents of the Ateneo. On May 28, 2009, Carlos París Amador was elected president. Members have included six Prime Ministers, all Spanish Nobel Prize winners, Spanish politicians of the Second Republic and the members of the Generations of 1898, of 1914 and 1927.

== Exhibitions ==
The Ateneo has two Art Galleries for exhibitions of international contemporary artists. Antonio López made his first solo exhibition at the Ateneo in 1957. Artists like Lucio Muñoz, Manolo Millares, Marta Cardenas and Daniel Garbade have shown their work there.

== Gallery ==
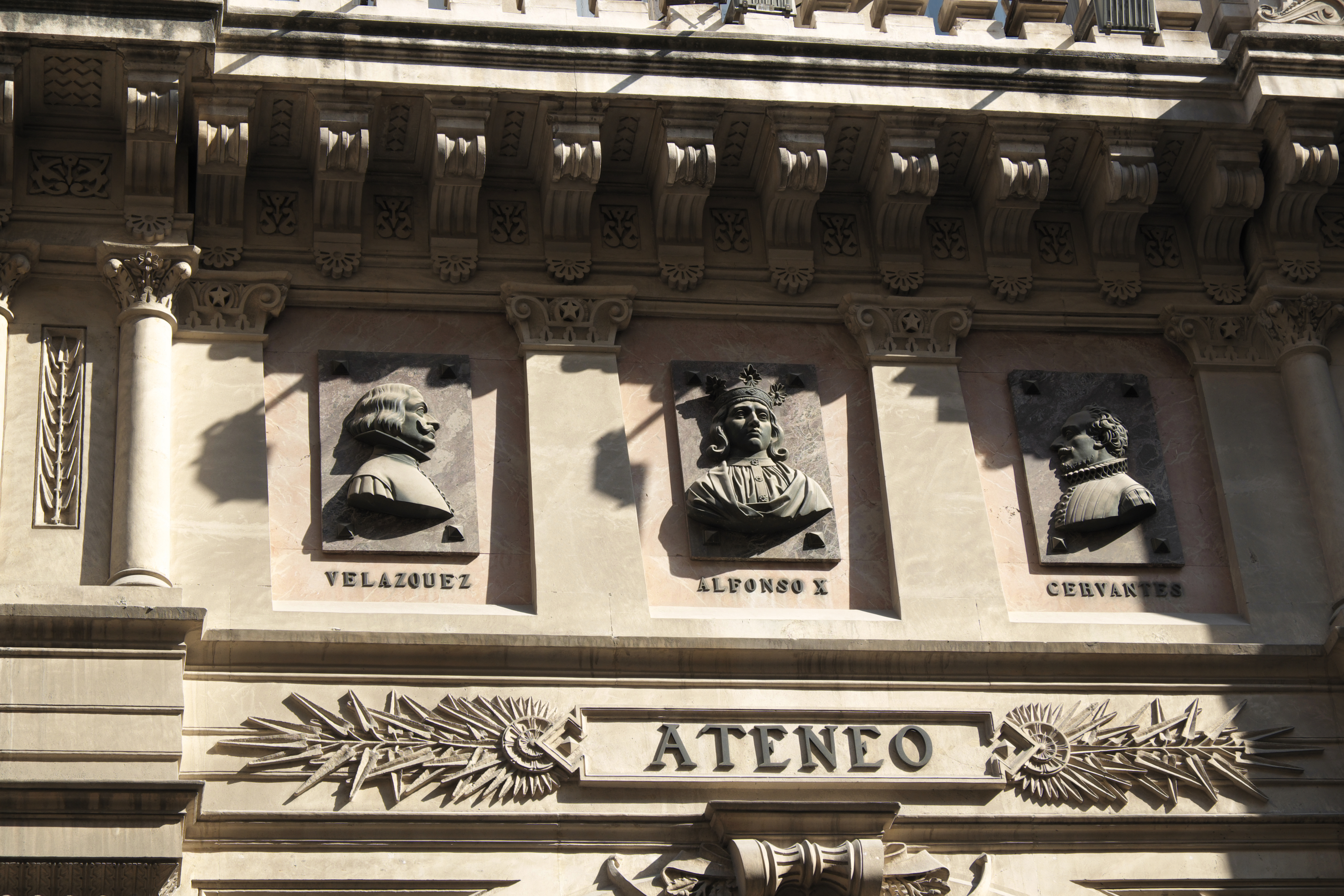
Exterior

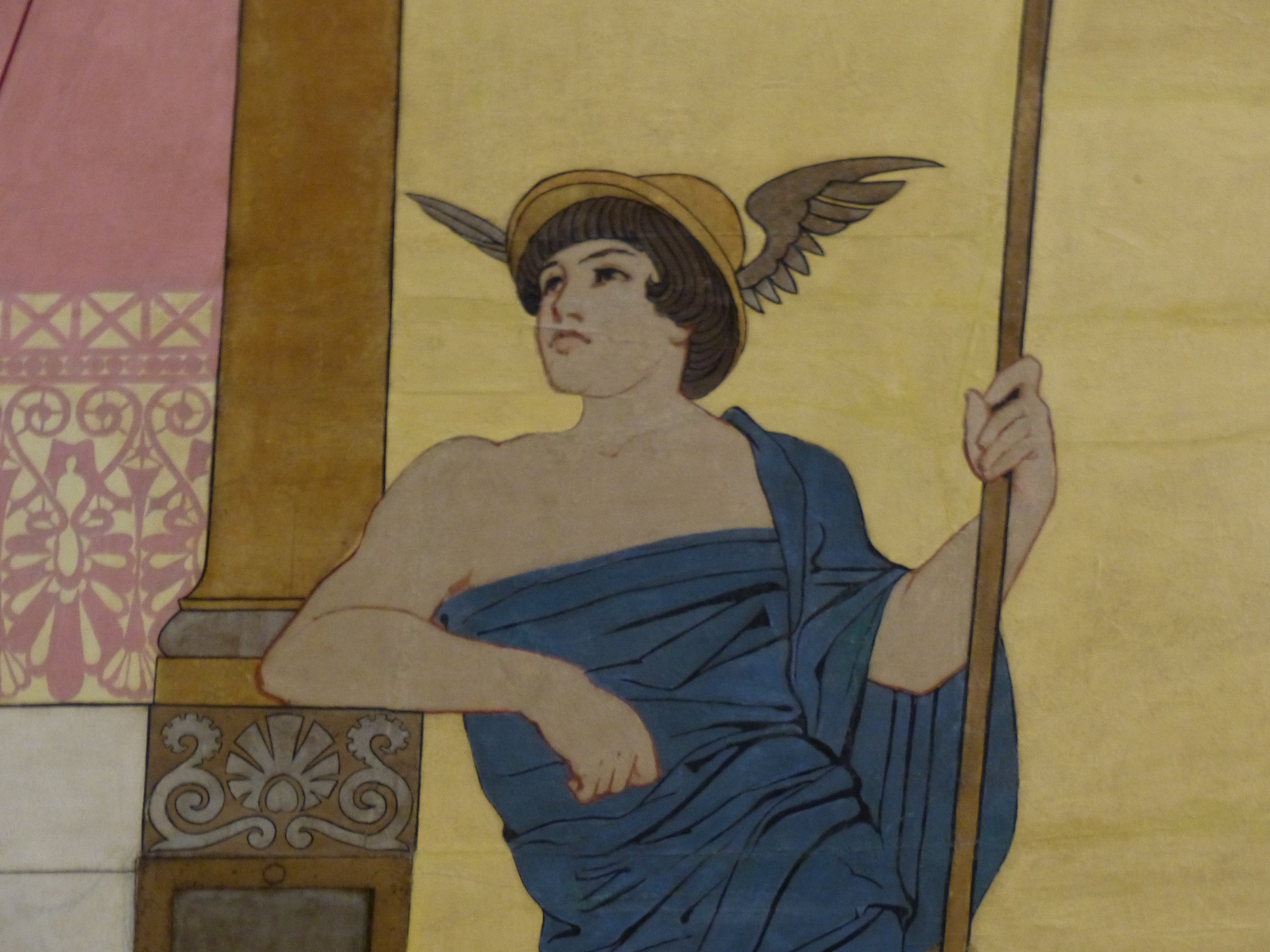
Portrait of Mercury (Hermes) on the roof of the Main Hall.

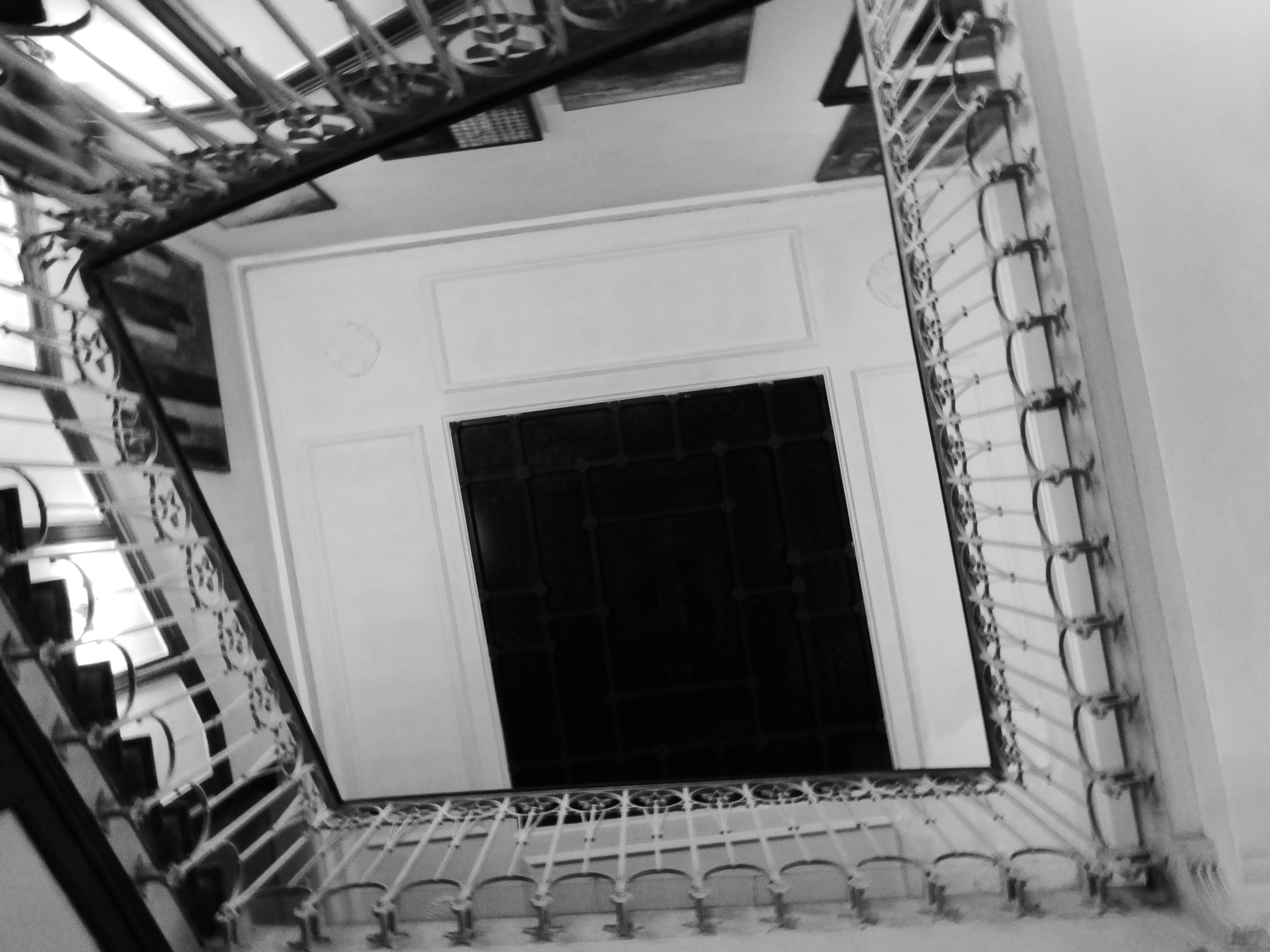
Staircase

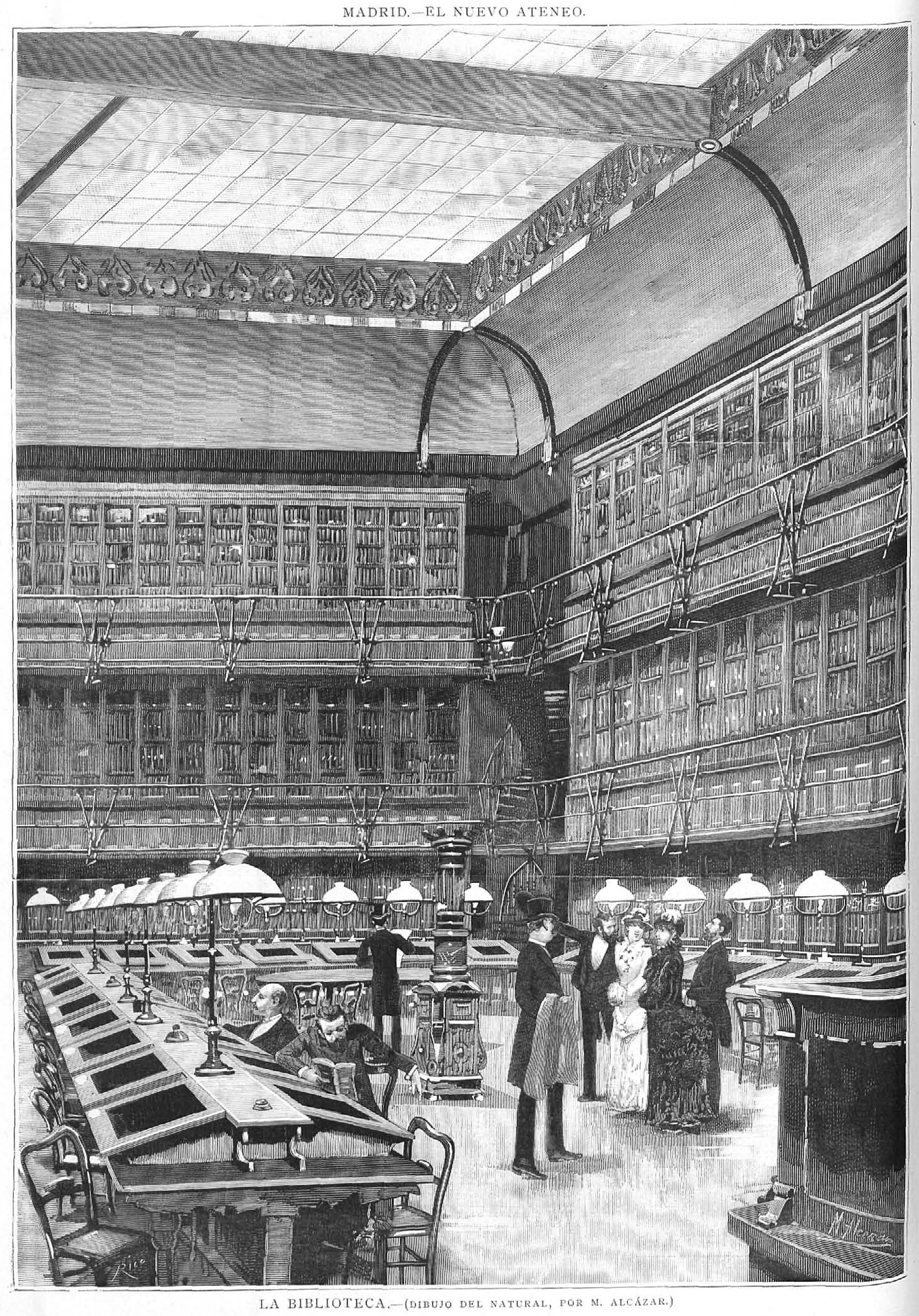
Drawing by Alcazar, library at the Ateneo

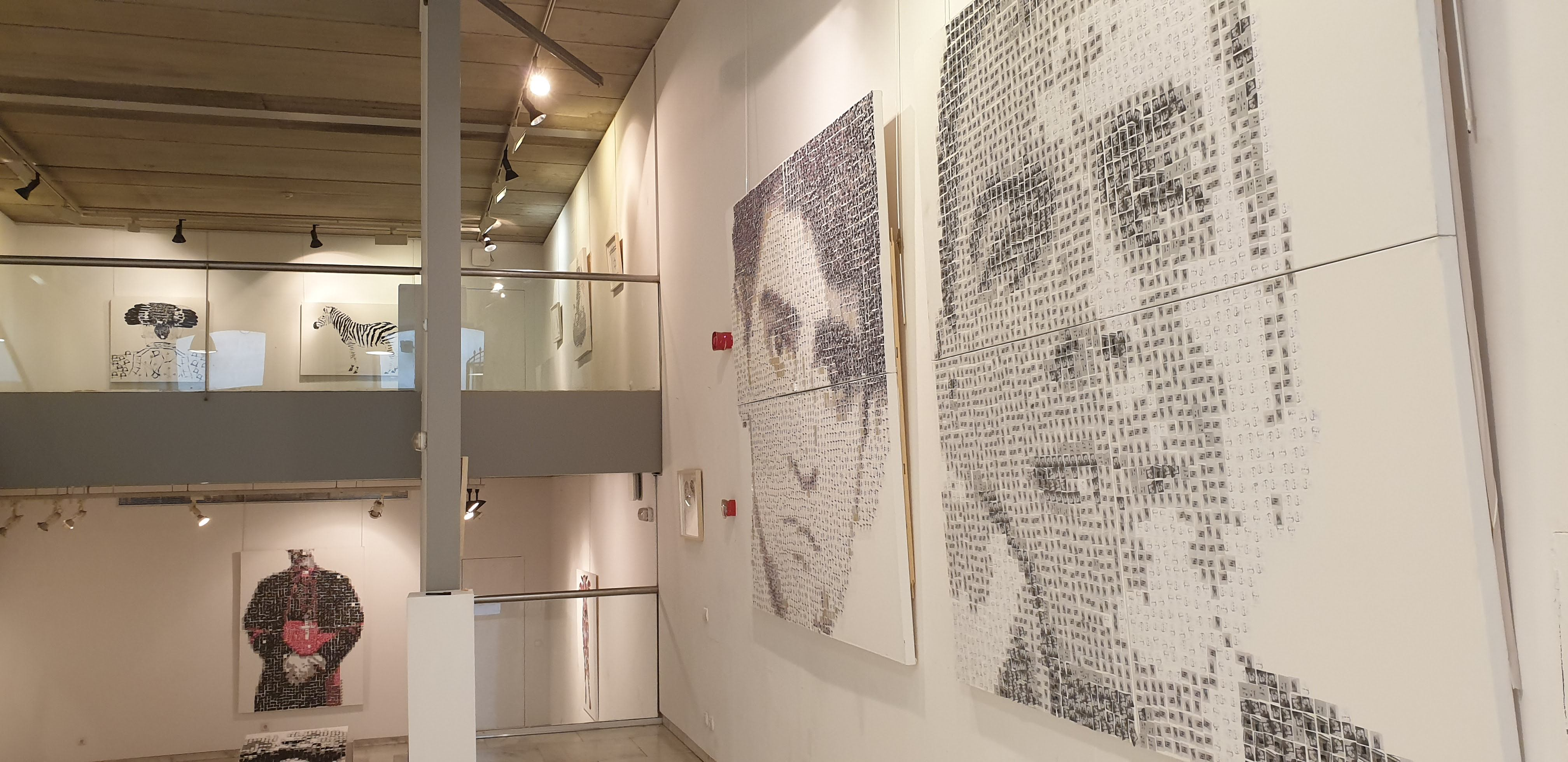
Exhibitions

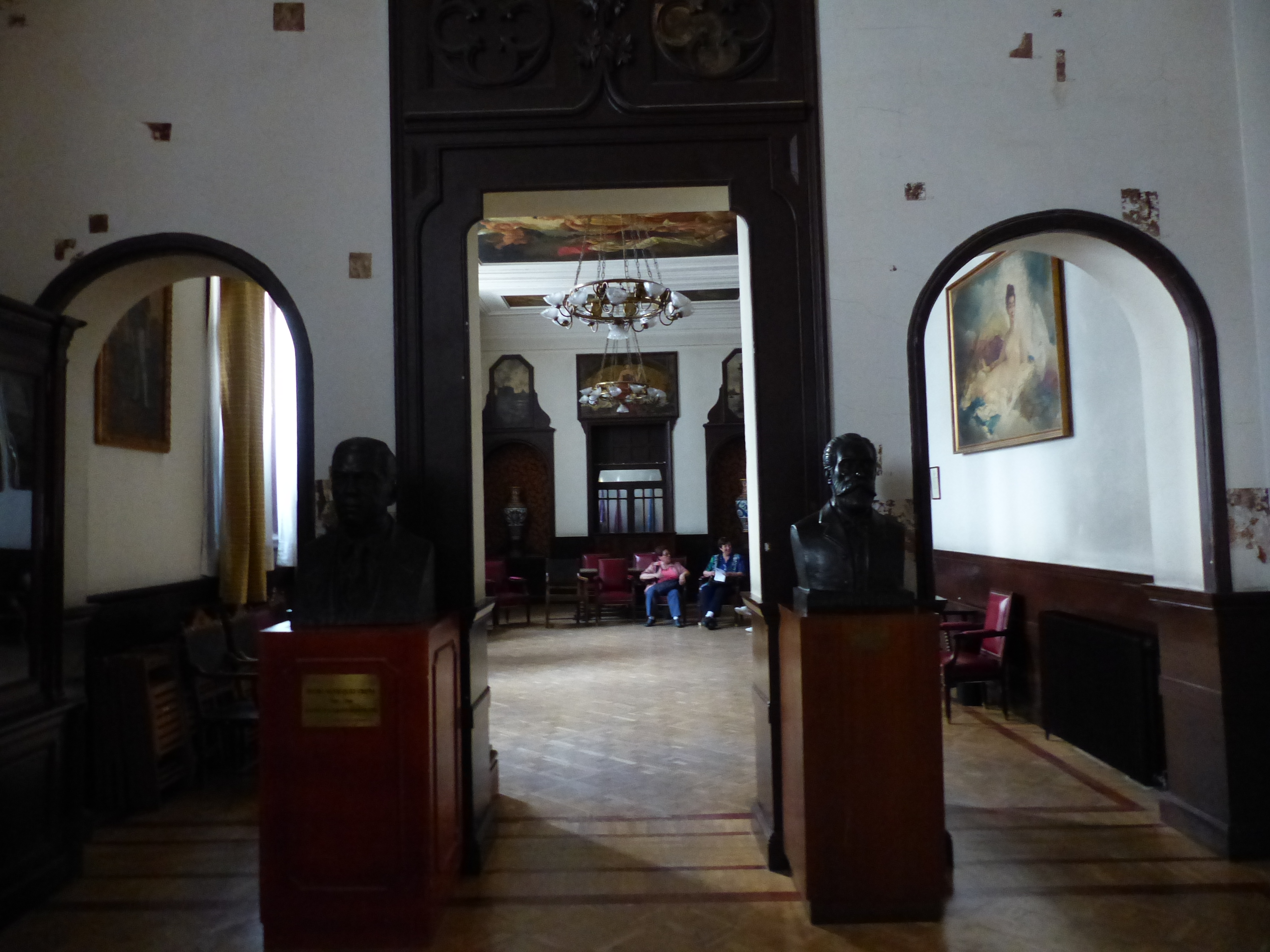
Interior

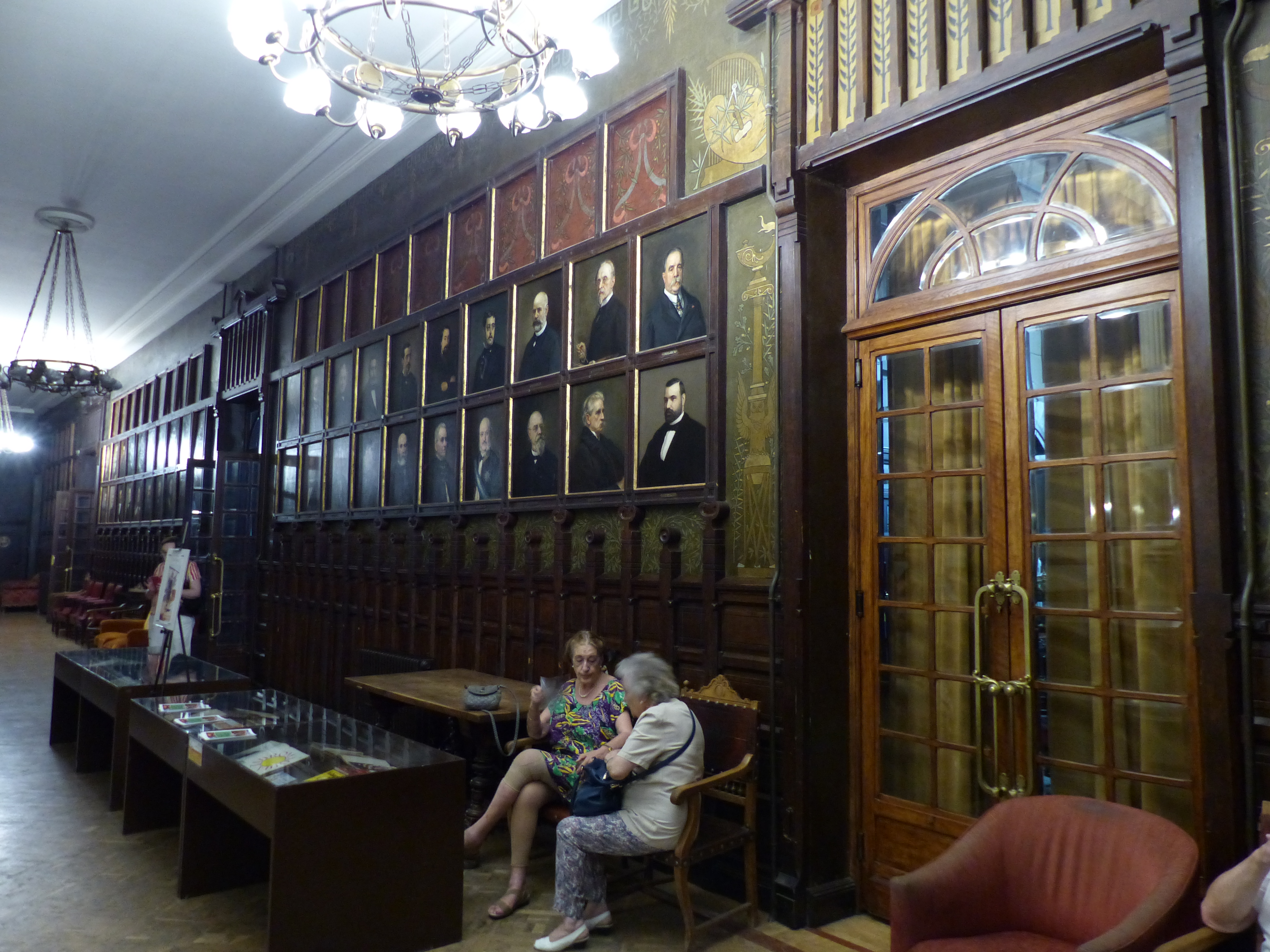

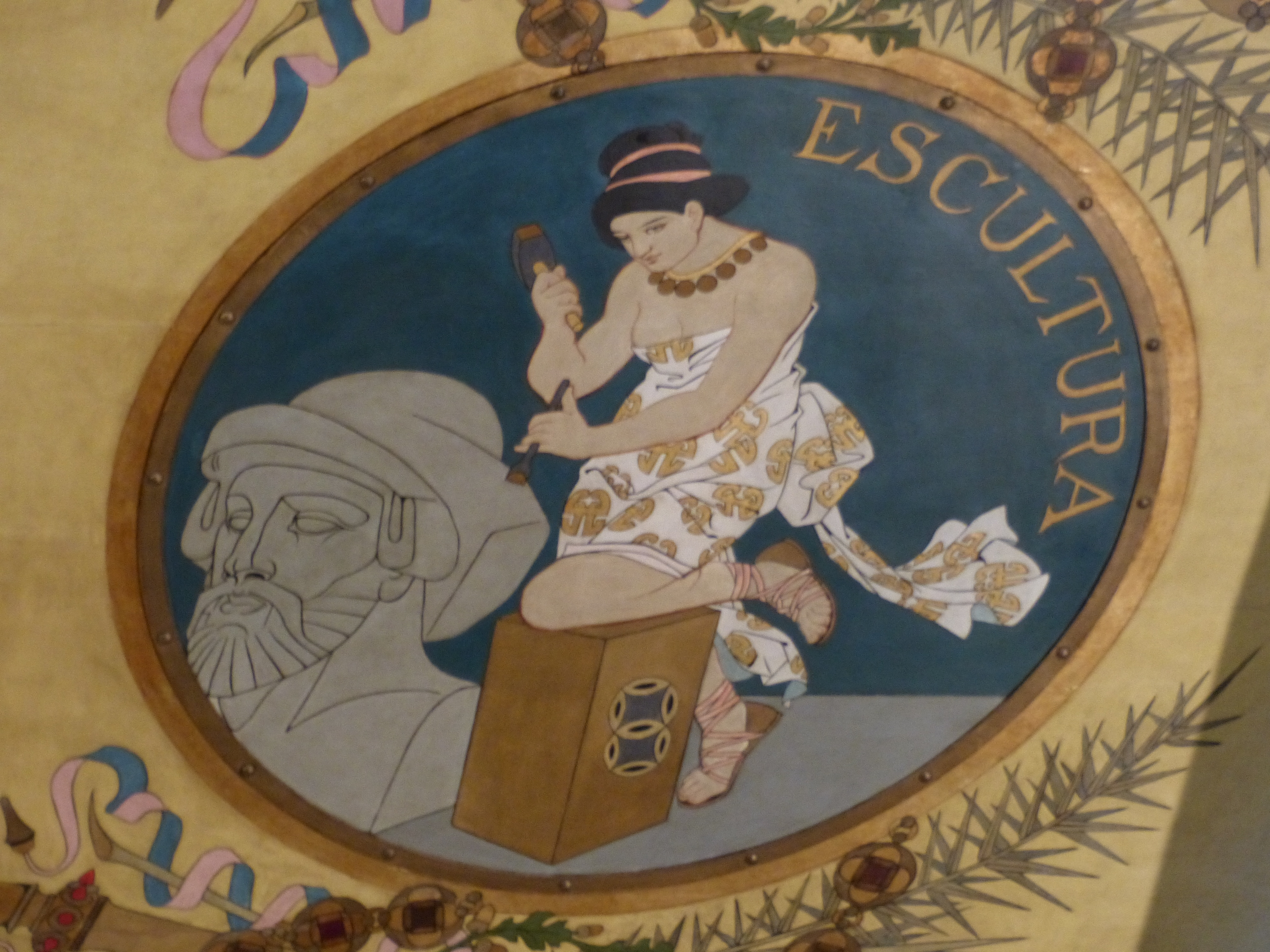

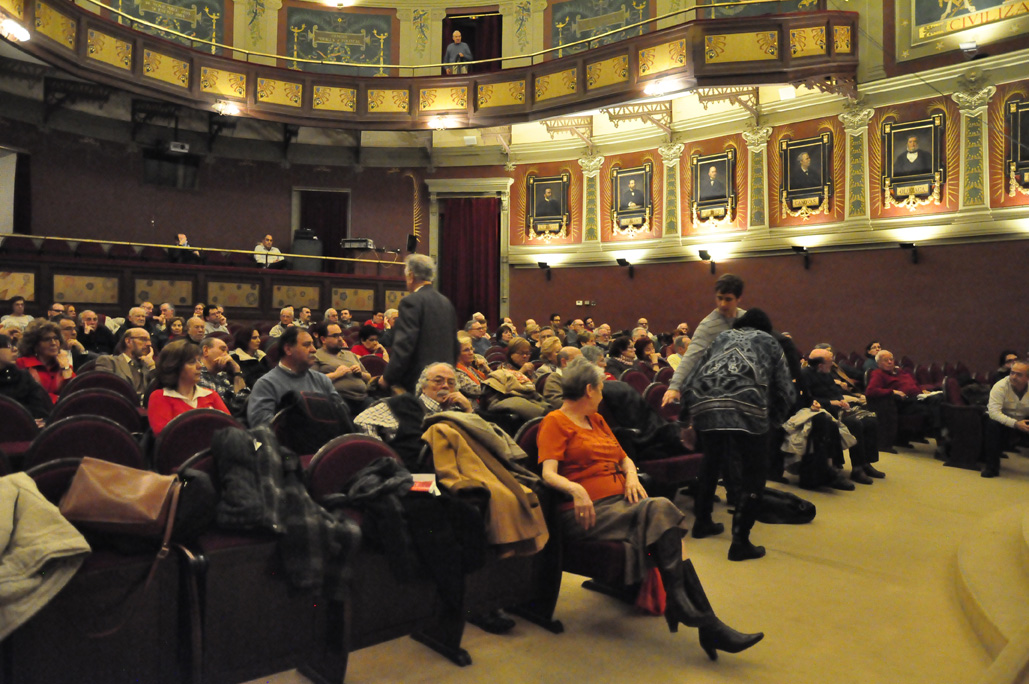
