= Luis Feito =

Spanish painter (1929–2021)

- Born: 13 October 1929; Madrid, Spain
- Died: 7 February 2021 (aged 91); Madrid, Spain
- Education: Escuela Superior de Bellas Artes de San Fernando
- Known for: Painting
- Movement: Cubism, informalism
- Awards: Ordre des Arts et des Lettres; 1993 Knight Commander

Luis Feito López (13 October 1929 – 7 February 2021) was a Spanish painter. His work was influenced by cubism and informalism. Feito lived and worked in Madrid until his death from COVID-19 during the COVID-19 pandemic in Madrid in February 2021. Following his death, two days of mourning were declared by his local council.

== Biography ==
Luis Feito began his formal training at the Escuela Superior de Bellas Artes de San Fernando (now Real Academia de Bellas Artes de San Fernando), Madrid, in 1950. He worked briefly in a figurative style before he discovered Cubism, but in 1954 the Galería Buchholz, Madrid, presented his first solo show of nonfigurative works. Thereafter, Feito remained committed to painting in an abstract mode.

In 1953 Feito traveled to Paris on a grant from the French government. After an exhibition at the Galerie Arnaud in 1955, he left his teaching position at the Escuela Superior de Bellas Artes de San Fernando and relocated to Paris, where he resided for nearly 25 years. While in Paris, he had the opportunity to view work by his international contemporaries—Jean Fautrier, Hans Hartung, Serge Poliakoff, and Mark Rothko particularly interested him—and became acquainted with several Art Informel artists. He was also introduced to automatism and began to incorporate other materials, most notably sand, into his paintings.

Feito nonetheless maintained close contact with the Spanish avant-garde and was a founding member of the Madrid-based group El Paso (1957–60), which emphasized an antiacademic, morally and socially responsible, innovative art for Spain. Other founding members included Manolo Millares, Manuel Rivera, and Antonio Saura. El Paso's manifesto articulated the group's aim to create a new spiritual state in Spanish art, recognizing the necessity to take action in the wake of the civil war. In 1981 he moved to Montreal and then to New York City in 1983, where he continued to live and work until the early 1990s.

During the late 1950s and early 1960s, Feito's work can be characterized by a subdued, colorless palette, contrasting blacks, grays, whites, and ochers. He later introduced red into his compositions as a counterpoint, and then as the primary color in many compositions. His work from this period also exhibits his interest in materiality through his overlapping of smooth and encrusted surfaces, which he accomplished by using sand and heavy impasto. In 1963 his work tended toward an increased formal and material simplicity in which circular forms predominated, reflecting his interest in Japanese art. Throughout his career Feito continually explored relationships among surface textures, light, color, and form. Because of his preoccupation with light, many critics have ascribed an element of mysticism to his work.

== Exhibitions and awards ==
Feito's early notable international group exhibitions include the Venice Biennale (1956, 1958, 1960, 1968); São Paulo Biennial (1957, 1963); Documenta, Kassel, West Germany (1959); Paris Biennial (1959); Guggenheim Museum (1960); Tate Gallery, London (1962); and Carnegie Institute, Pittsburgh (1962).

Retrospectives of his work include those at the Galerie Arnaud, Paris (1961); Hamburg Museum, West Germany (1964); Musée d'art contemporain, Montreal (1968); and Museo Espaol de Arte Contemporáneo (now Museo Nacional Centro de Arte Reina Sofía), Madrid (1998). After his election to the Real Academia de Bellas Artes de San Fernando in 1998, Reina Sofía organized a traveling retrospective (2002).

He was named Officer (1985) and Commander (1993) of the French Ordre des Arts et des Lettres. He received the international grand prize from the Asociación Espaola de Críticos de Arte (AECA) at the art fair Arco, Madrid (2002).
