= Paul Facchetti =

Italian-French gallery owner and photographer (1912–2010)

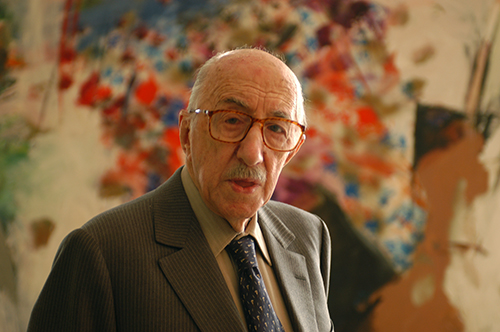
Facchetti in 2005

Paul Laurent Louis Facchetti (1 September 1912 – 27 November 2010) was an Italian-French gallery owner and photographer, based in France.

== Life ==
Facchetti was born in Coccaglio, near Brescia, northern Italy, in 1912. His father was a professor of drawing at the Brera Academy of Fine Arts in Milan. In 1928, the Facchetti family emigrated to France, first to Lorraine and then to Paris. In 1935, Facchetti opened his own photography studio, and in 1939 obtained French citizenship. He successfully pursued a career as a photographer until 1952, when he converted his studio into a gallery in collaboration with the art critic and visual artist Michel Tapié. Later, he also collaborated with the German art dealer Margarete Lauter.

During its early years, the Facchetti Gallery was closely associated with the Art Informel movement through its exhibitions. At the same time, in addition to his duties as the gallery's owner, Facchetti continued his photography work, focusing on portraits of artists and intellectuals who visited the exhibitions. In the early 1970s, Facchetti opened a second gallery, in Zurich, showcasing artists such as Jackson Pollock, Jean Dubuffet, Jean Fautrier, Georges Mathieu, Wols, Sam Francis, Henri Michaux, Joseph Sima, Alekos Fassianos, Alexis Akrithakis, Georges Noël, Jean-Paul Riopelle, and others.

In 1980, Facchetti retired from the gallery business and shifted his focus to the art trade. As a photographer, he captured various celebrities from the arts and literature (Salvador Dalí, Brigitte Bardot, Rita Hayworth, Truman Capote, Georges Mathieu, and others). His works are included in the collections of the Stedelijk, the New York Public Library, the Centre Georges Pompidou (CNAC), and other institutions.

Facchetti died in Joigny on 27 November 2010.
