= Museo de Arte Contemporáneo Helga de Alvear =

Coordinates: 39°28′18″N 6°22′24″W

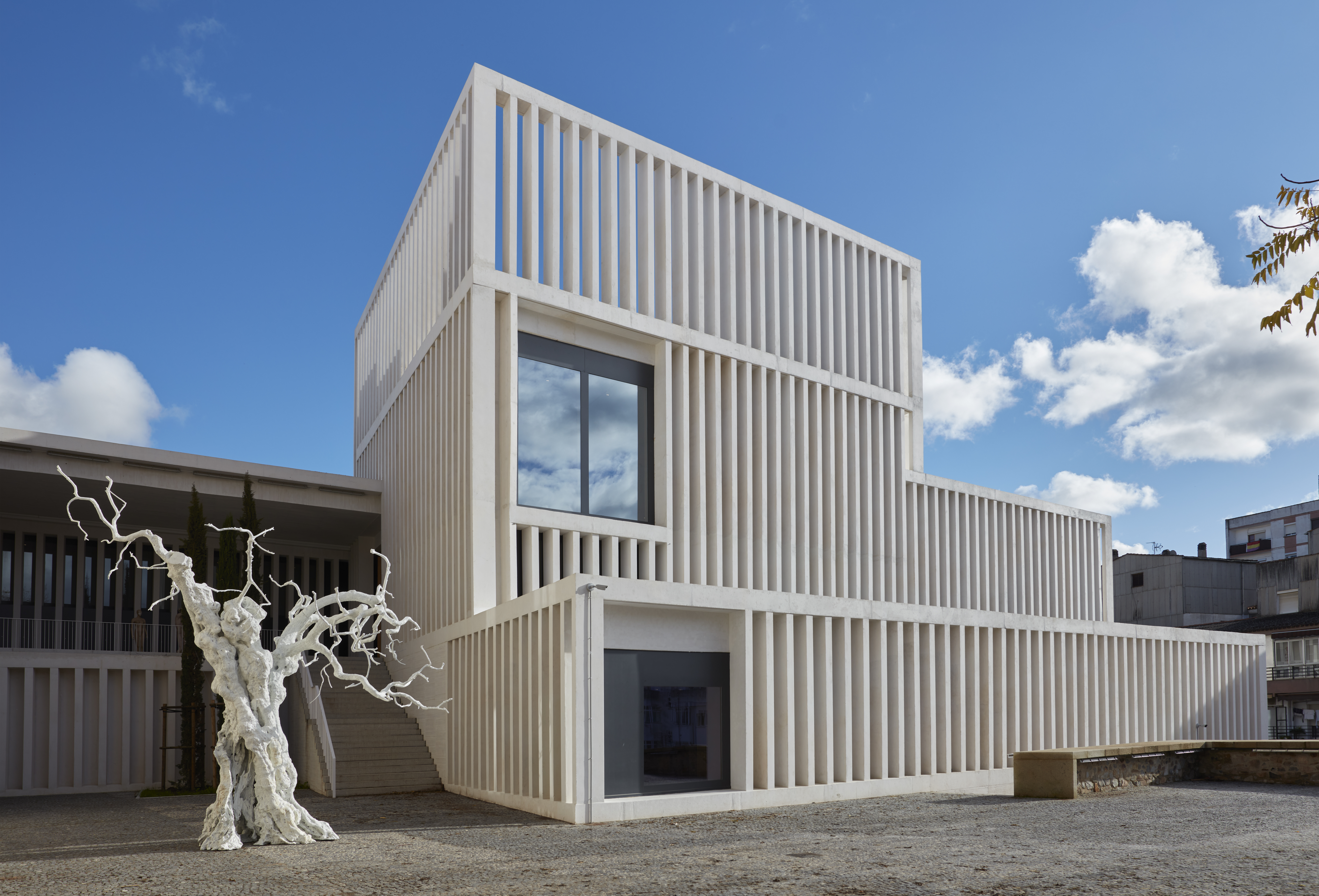
Exterior of the museum

The Museo de Arte Contemporáneo Helga de Alvear (Helga de Alvear Museum of Contemporary Art) is a museum located in Cáceres, Spain. It is renowned for its extensive collection of contemporary art, and was established by Helga de Alvear, a German-born art collector, philanthropist, and patron of the arts, who was instrumental in promoting contemporary art in Spain.

== Collection ==
The museum was established in 2010 as the Centro de Artes Visuales Helga de Alvear but reopened in its current form in a modernist building designed by Emilio Tuñón in February 2021. The museum contains a collection of over 3000 pieces of art, including paintings, sculptures, videos, photography, installation, and new media, with works by people such as Andreas Gursky, Gerhard Richter, Joseph Beuys, Richard Serra, and Eduardo Chillida.
