= Manuel Rivera (painter) =

Spanish painter

Manuel Rivera, sometimes referred to as Manuel Rivera Hernández, (April 23, 1927– January 2, 1995) was a Spanish painter. He was a founding member of the influential "El Paso group" of Spanish artists in Madrid who were at the forefront of the Spanish avant-garde art movement of the Post-World War II era. His works are part of the permanent collections of several museums, including the Metropolitan Museum of Art in New York City and the J. Paul Getty Museum in Los Angeles.

== Life and career ==
Born in Granada, Rivera began his training as a sculptor in the studio of Martín Simón. His interests moved to painting and he trained at the Escuela Superior de Bellas Artes de Seville (now part of the University of Seville) where he began his studies in 1945 at the age of 18. His first major exhibition was at the Granada Press Association in 1947. After completing his education, he moved to Madrid in 1951 where he became known as a painter of murals and frescos in public spaces and churches. This led to commissions as a muralist and fresco artist in cities throughout Spain.

Initially a painter working in the style of figurative art, Rivera began working in an abstract style in the 1950s. In 1953 he took part in the Congreso de Arte Abstracto de Santander (Congress of Abstract Art). In 1957 he co-founded the El Paso group in Madrid with fellow artists Rafael Canogar, Luis Feito, Juana Francés, Manolo Millares, Pablo Serrano, Antonio Suárez, and Antonio Saura. The founding members also included art critics José Ayllón and Manolo Conde. From 1957 through 1960 Rivera and the other artists in this group jointly presented several exhibitions in Spain and abroad which had a profound impact on the development of Spanish Art. The group's final exhibition was at the L'Attico gallery in Rome in 1960. The Marlborough Gallery featured a retrospective exhibition of the group's works in May and June 2004 entitled ‘El Paso, 1957-1960’.

In 1967 Rivera began experimenting with artistic techniques and ideas from Asian cultures. In 1981 he was awarded Spain's gold medal for Merit in Fine Arts. He was also the recipient of the Chevalier's Cross of l'Ordre des Arts et des Lettres of France.
