= Margarete Lauter =

German art dealer

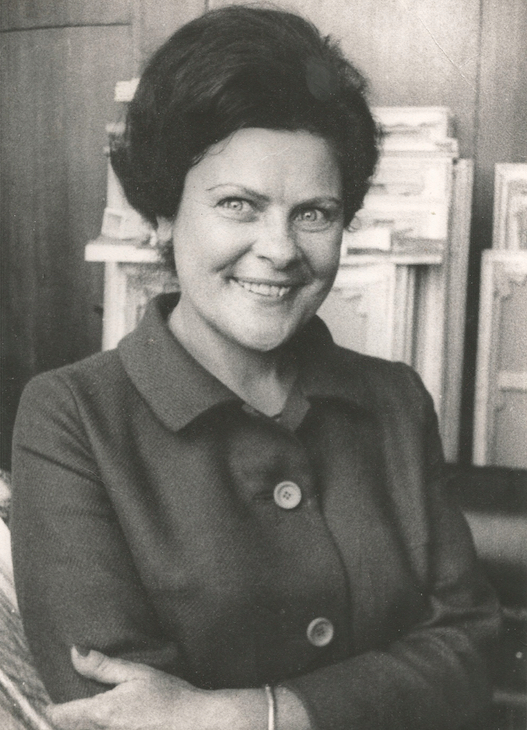
Lauter in 1967

Margarete Lauter (née Vetter) (9 September 1925 in Büchenbronn/Pforzheim; 2 October 2004 in Mannheim) was a German art dealer with the first Art Gallery for international contemporary art established in 1963 in Mannheim (Germany) after the Second World War 1945 mainly presenting works by German, French, Spanish, Italian, Japanese, Korean, Romanian, Belgian, Hungarian, Israeli, Slovenian, Austrian and US artists.

== Life ==
Margarete Vetter grew up as the daughter of a farming family with 4 siblings. Her mother promoted her early on with cultural activities. In the late years of the Second World War she met the young architect Harro Lauter (October 17, 1919 – October 5, 1996), whom she married in 1948. After spending 3 years in her father-in-law's parental home in Hoffenheim / Sinsheim (Germany), her husband was appointed architect in 1952 to the Mannheim Building Authority. In 1963, in collaboration with the Mannheim and Paris based artist Rudi Baerwind and the Galerie Paul Facchetti, Paris, she opened the first gallery for international contemporary art after the Second World War in Mannheim. The couple had three children. The youngest son, Rolf Lauter, grew up in his mother's gallery in the 1960s, became assistant curator and curator at the gallery and has been appointed later as museum director.

== Galerie Lauter ==
Galerie Margarete Lauter 1963–1967

The first gallery space was located in Mannheim, Bismarckstrasse at the square L 15, 7–9, near the main train station, from 1963 to 1967. Galerie Margarete Lauter opened on November 21, 1963, with an exhibition that took place in close collaboration with the Galerie Paul Facchetti, Paris, presenting works of the artists Ger Lataster, Ung-No Lee, Georges Noël, Rudi Baerwind, and Zoltan Kemeny, and objects of traditional African art. The guests were welcomed at the opening of the exhibition by the mayor of the city of Mannheim and friend of Margarete Lauter, Hans Reschke. Dietrich Mahlow, director of the Kunsthalle Baden-Baden, made an introduction to the exhibition. Paul Facchetti from Paris in conversation with the artist Rudi Baerwind. Heinz Fuchs, director of the Kunsthalle Mannheim, a friend of the Lauter family for a long time, chats with the artists. In other exhibitions Lauter has shown works by: Uwe Lausen (1964–1965), Magie du banal (1965), Zoran Antonio Mušič (1965), Natalia Dumitresco (1965, 1971), Rudi Baerwind and Georges Noël (1965), Pierre Clerc (1965–1966) together with art and cult objects from Africa (1965–1966, 1968), Syn: Bernd Berner, Rolf Gunter Dienst, Klaus Jürgen-Fischer, Eduard Micus, Marc Vaux (1966), Alexandre Istrati (1966, 1975), Karl Fred Dahmen (1966, 1969, 1972) Luciano Lattanzi and Werner Schreib (1966, 1974, 1988), Divergenzen 66: Otmar Alt, Francisco Cuadrado, Jean-Luc Guerin, Dieter Krieg, Jobst Meyer, Manfred Mohr, Walter Montel, Rainer Negrelli, Marcel Robelin, Georg Meistermann (1967), Jaroslav Serpan (1967).

Galerie Lauter

In 1967 the gallery moved to a larger space in square B 4, 10a, where up to 6 exhibitions under the new name Galerie Lauter took place every year with international contemporary art (1967–1990). Here she realised amongst others exhibitions by: Jaroslav Serpan (1967, 1978), Amadeo Gabino (1967, 1970, 1982, 1990), Erwin Bechtold (1965, 1968, 1973, 1979, 1984, 1989, 1992), Shusaku Arakawa (1968, 1986), Louise Nevelson (1968), Otto Herbert Hajek (1968, 1977, 1989), Gianfranco Baruchello (1969), Otmar Alt (1969, 1981), Manuel Rivera (1970), Karl Prantl (1970), Rolf-Gunter Dienst (1970), Dieter Krieg (1970, 1988), Wilhelm Loth (1970), Manolo Millares (1971), Reipka - Paluzzi (1971), KRH Sonderborg (1972), Rolf Kissel (1972, 1976, 1979), Op Art & Kinetik: Narciso Debourg, Heinz Mack, Louis Tomasello, Günther Uecker, Jean-Pierre Yvaral (1973), Herrmann Goepfert (1974, 1992), Erwin Heerich (1974), Accrochage 74 (1974) Otto Piene (1975, 1992), Alexandre Istrati (1975), Adolf Luther (1975, 1989), Pierre Alechinsky (1976), HA Schult (1976), Gustav Seitz (1976, 1989), Miguel Berrocal (1976), Antoni Tàpies (1977), Robert Motherwell (1977), Joan Miró (1978), Serpan (1978), Robert Häusser (1978), Antonio Saura (1979), Georges Mathieu (1980), Georges Noël (1980, 1984), Erich Hauser (1980), Heinz Mack (1981, 1985, 1992 ), Hans Hartung (1981), Victor Vasarely (1982/83), Roberto Matta (1983), George Rickey (1983), Antonio Saura (1985–86), Rafael Mahdavi (1987), Karel Appel (1987), Ger Lataster (1987/88), Werner Schreib (1988), Adolf Luther (1989), Victor Vasarely (1989), COBRA (1990), Yaacov Agam (1989/90).

From 1990 to 1996 Lauter changed for new tall spaces at Friedrichsplatz 14, right next to the Kunsthalle Mannheim and Mannheim's landmark, the water tower.

From 1996 she retired to private rooms for 4 years after her husband died, focusing on smaller exhibitions and art consulting. Finally in 2000 she reopened a gallery space at Friedrichsplatz 15 to conduct art trading in a reduced form. Lauter ended her gallery activities in spring 2003, after 40 years of successful work, in which she was able to build up numerous new private collections.
