= Luis Sáenz de la Calzada =

Spanish painter, poet, and actor

Luis Sáenz de la Calzada (1912–1994) was a Spanish painter, poet and actor.
