= Gaston Orellana =

Spanish painter

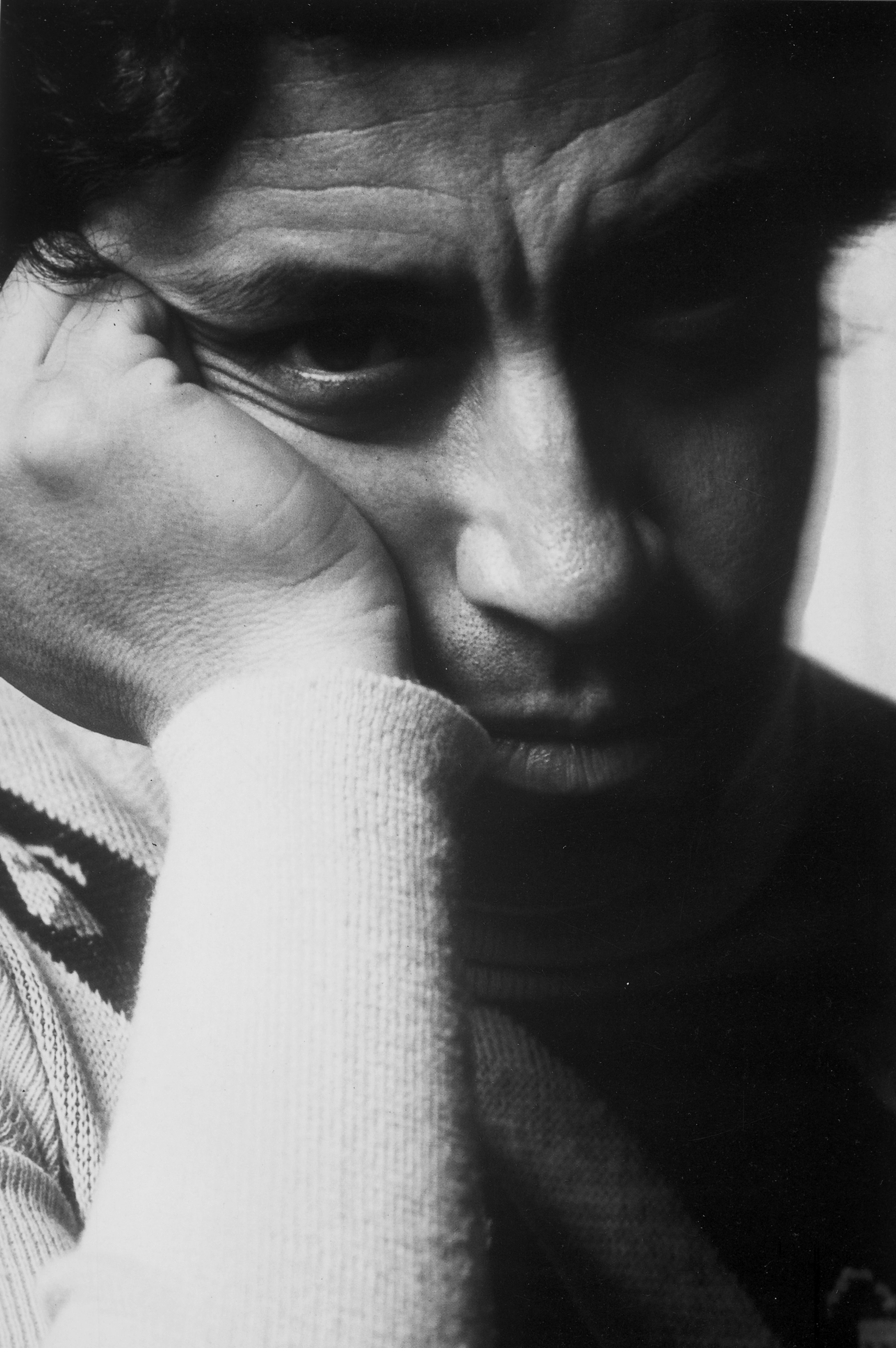
- Gaston Orellana, photograph by Mimmo da Brescia, courtesy of Edizioni d'Arte Severgnini
- Born: 18 July 1933 (age 93); Valparaíso, Chile
- Education: Escuela de Bellas Artes de Viña del Mar, Chile; University of Chile, Santiago; Royal Academy, London
- Known for: painting
- Notable work: The Train in Flames, Crucifixion no 1, Triptico en forma de T Invertida
- Movement: Neo-figurative, Post-conceptualism

Gaston Orellana (born 18 July 1933) is a Spanish and Chilean painter. Although born abroad, Orellana was born into the ancient aristocratic house of Orellana la Vieja, from Extremadura, Spain. He has since lived in Spain, Italy, the United States, the United Kingdom and France.

== Early career ==
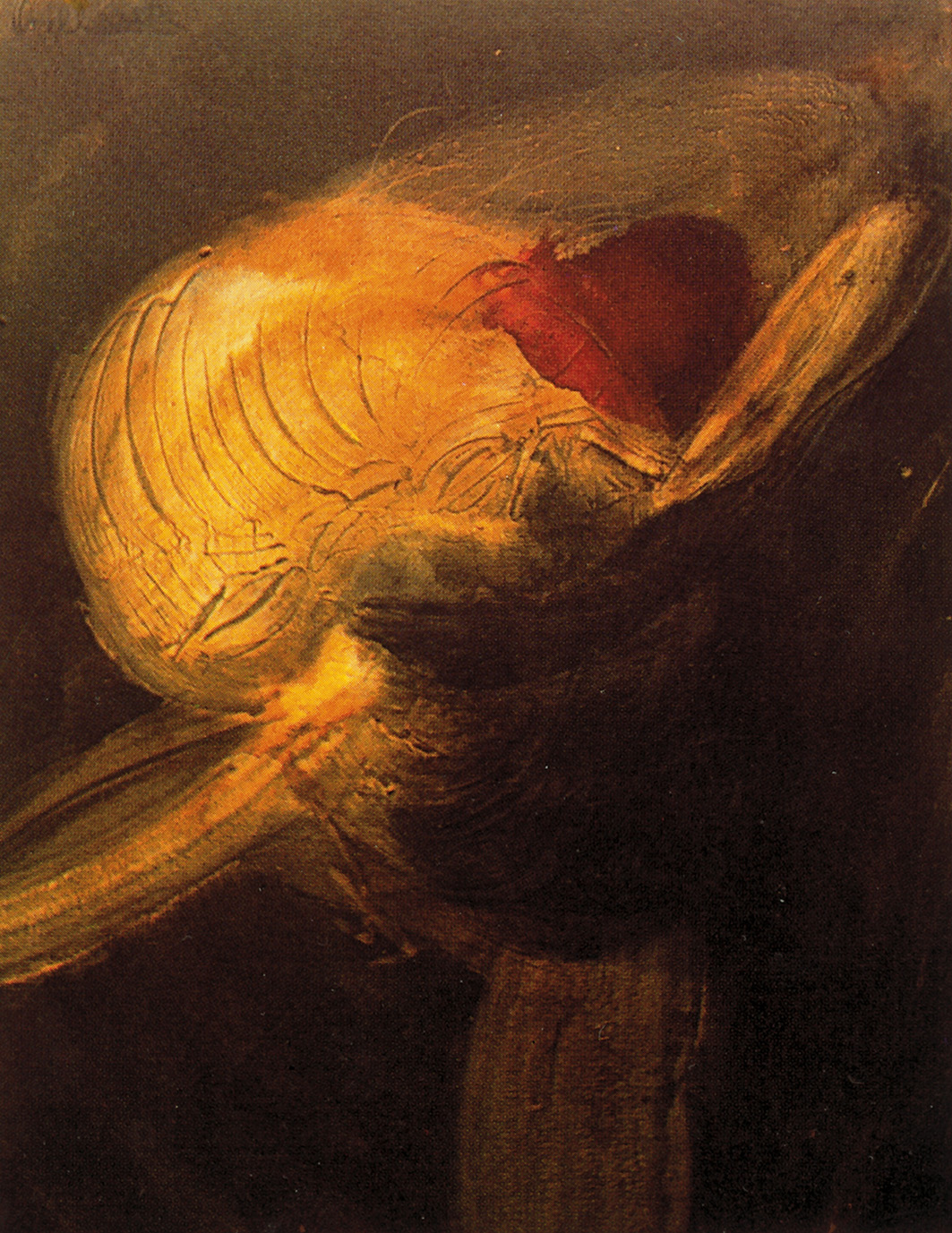
Niño Convulsionado 1959, private collection

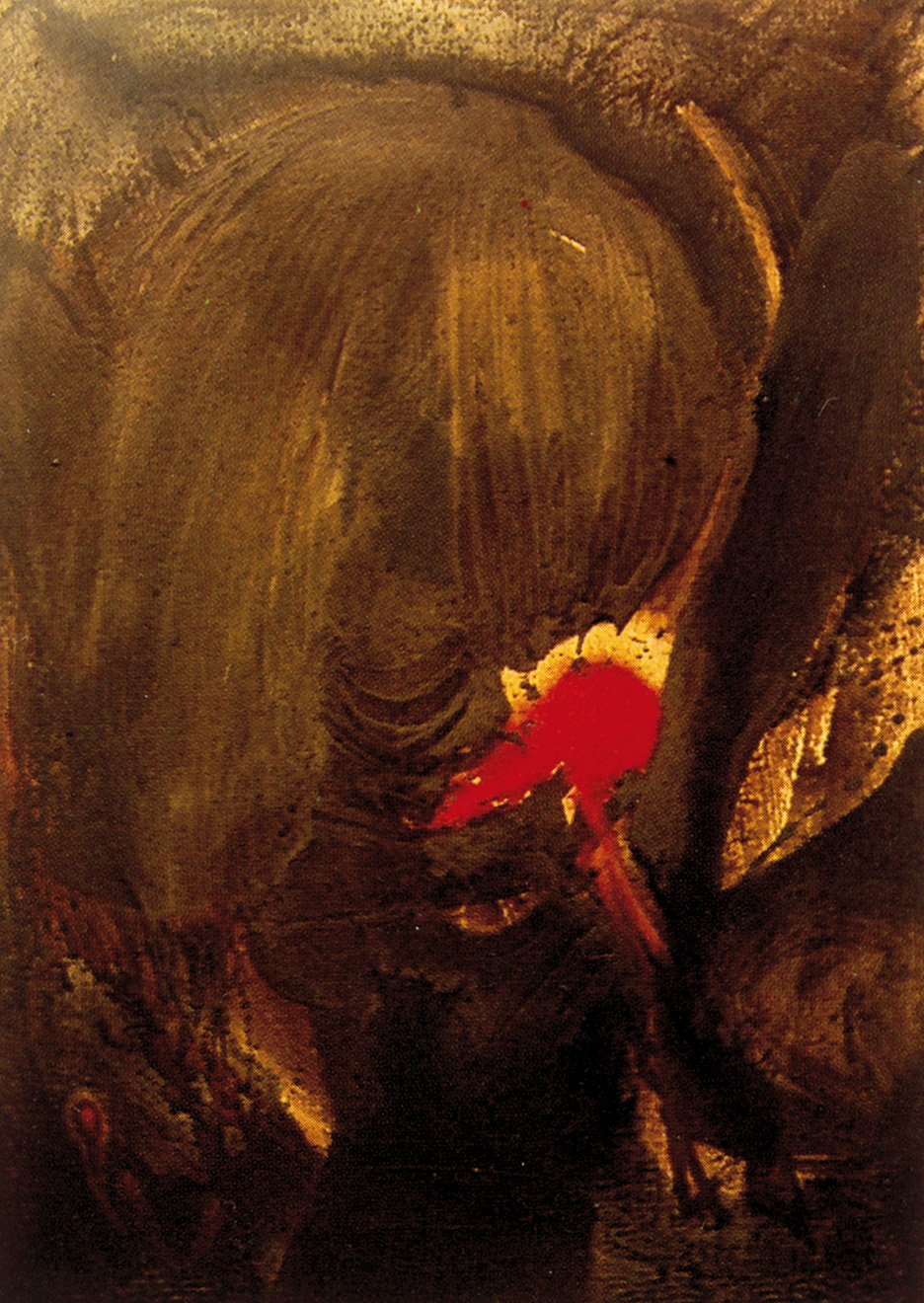
El Suicida 1961, private collection

Orellana was born in the city of Valparaíso, son of Spanish parents Armando de Orellana, an engineer and Spanish diplomat, and Ernestina del Transito née Morgadon, during his father's tenure as Spanish special diplomatic representative to Chile. His siblings were born during similar diplomatic residencies abroad in Brazil and Argentina. Orellana first studied Fine Art at the experimental Escuela Experimental de Educación Artistica Santiago, Chile. He then continued his studies at the Escuela de Bellas Artes de Viña del Mar and perfectioned his skill with the violin at the Conservatorio de Música within the same school. In 1954, Orellana meets Pablo Neruda, establishing an intense relationship that was to last until the death of the poet. This friendship was to greatly affect Orellana, to whom the poet dedicated the poem "Recibimiento" in 1966, praising "what lies in the work/ of Orellana/ is as alive/ as a life, as secure as/ an object, as mysterious/ as a stone." Orellana briefly studied at the University of Chile reading Archaeology and Anthropology, studies that were followed by a journey of archaeological studies through Northern Chile, Peru, Bolivia and Argentina, led by Father Le Perc and the famous archaeologist Antonio Diez de Medina. Following this intense period of studies in archaeology, which were to greatly affect his work to this day, Orellana moved to Spain, first in a brief spell in Mallorca and then to settle in Madrid, where he became a founding member of the Grupo Hondo in 1959.

In his earliest works, Orellana shows some of the signs that were to become the Neo-figuration, with expressive and yet undefined figures. Orellana's works from this period are distinguished for their almost monochromatic nature, where most figures appear in black and grayscale, to the point that, even though there is a predominant use of oxides and sand, they had an almost watercoulour appearance. On 8 December 1959, the Grupo Hondo proclaims its Neo-figurative theoric principles in a manifesto written by the poet Manuel Conde, of which Orellana is a founding member. In this period, Orellana reaches maturity as an artist, and his paintings reach the confluence of informal abstraction and the mannerism of an existential figuration that would seem even mystical in its representation. In this period, Orellana's work is enriched in terms of colour and texture, developing his artistic expression in a most definite manner.

== New York years ==
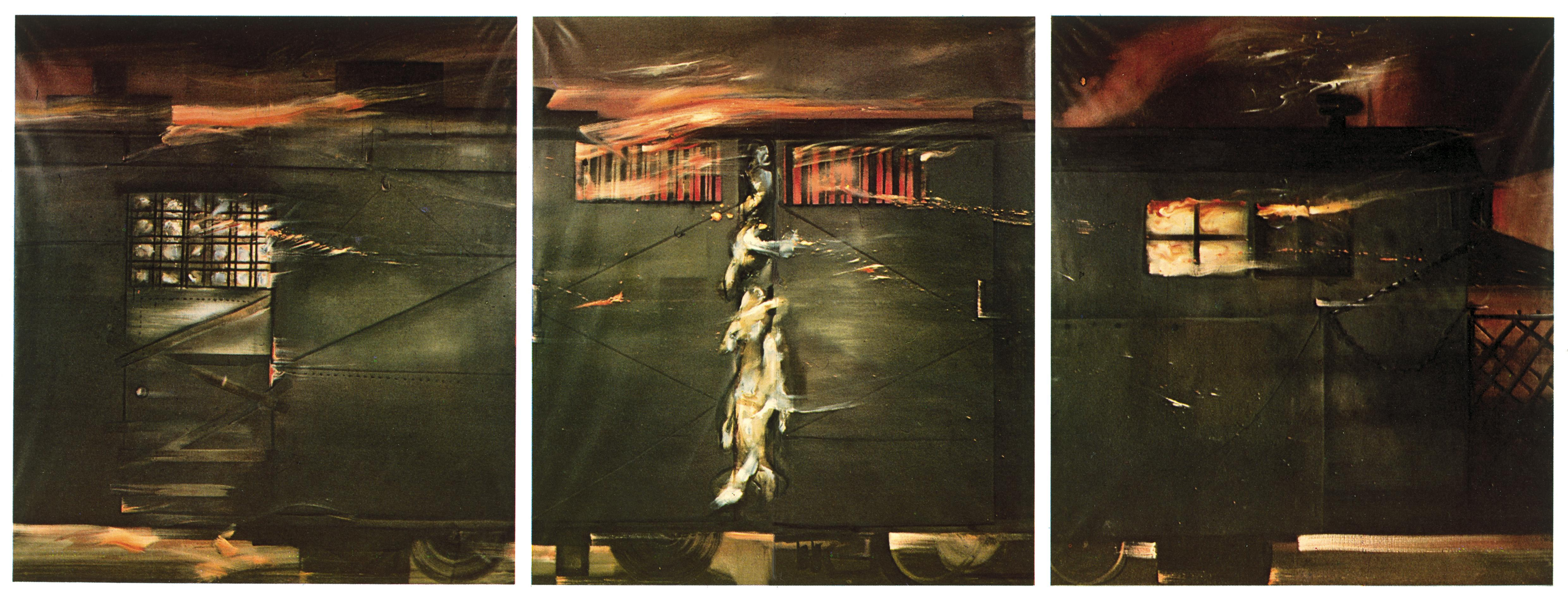
The Train in Flames, 1969, Hirshhorn Museum and Sculpture Garden

In 1964, Orellana participates in the opening exhibition of the Juana Mordó Gallery, in Madrid, Spain, with whom he was to establish a long-lasting business relationship. In the following year, he moves to New York, even though he continued to travel extensively to Spain, Italy, Switzerland and the United Kingdom. New York proved to be a melting pot of artistic creation that greatly encouraged the artist through its lively artistic scene. Friendships such as the Duke of Bedford's drew him into the creative circles, where he met James Johnson Sweeney, with whom he established a powerful friendship; Bob Dylan, Arthur Miller, whom he met at the showing of the film Good Times Wonderful Times, at the congress of the Pen & Pencil Club; the dealer Martha Jackson; Allen Ginsberg; Leon Golub, Lawrence Alloway. In 1966 he started a thriving business relationship with the New York dealer Martha Jackson who introduced him to the movement that was to result in the historic exhibition at the MOMA "The New Image of Man". In 1969, with the poet Allen Ginsberg and other artists, he participates in numerous protests against the Vietnam War. In the same year Orellana was assaulted in his studio in Chinatown by a band of Chilean criminals and drug addicts, which almost resulted in his losing his life. In 1967 he exhibits at the Bienville Gallery, in New Orleans, for the first time. In this period, Orellana participated in several academic pursuits: lecturing at The State University of New Jersey; participating as a member of the Art Coalition; and publishing several anti-belligerent articles in New York's Village Voice and the magazine Ramparts.

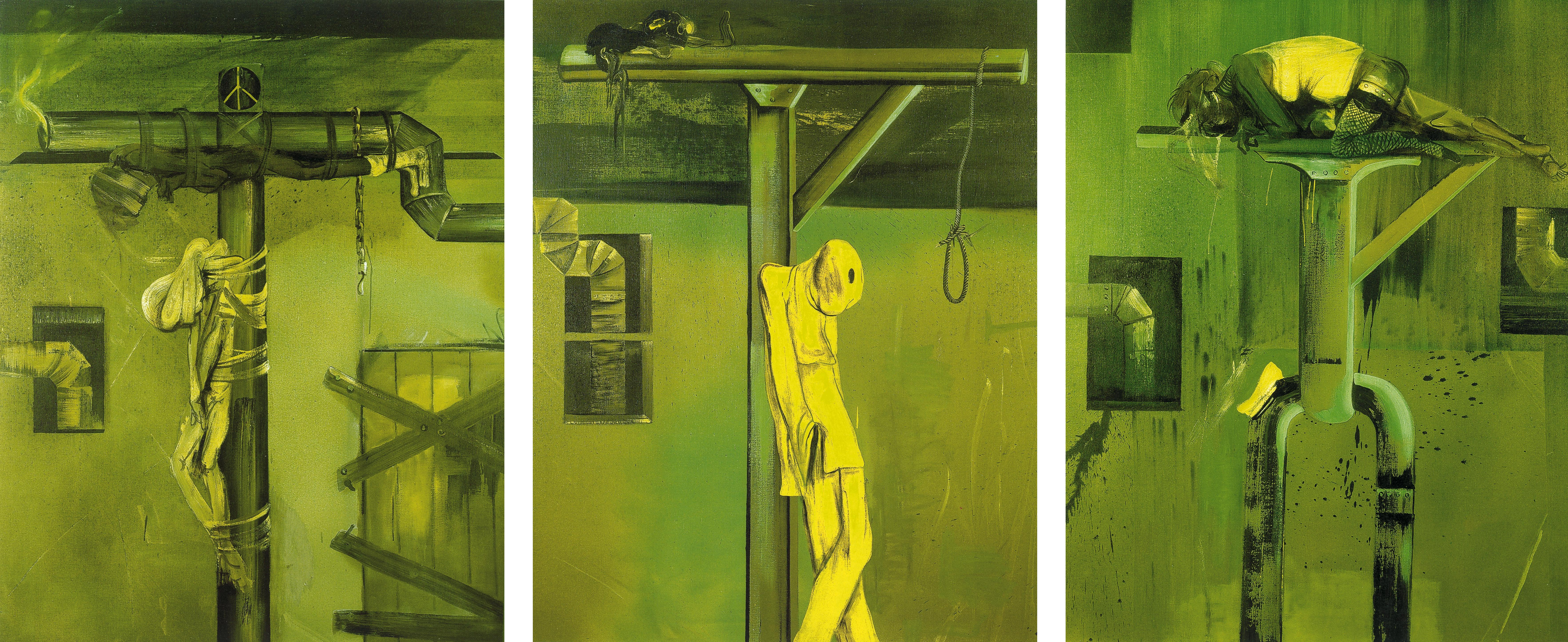
Crucifixion no 1, 1971, The Vatican Contemporary Art Collection

In 1970 he represents Spain at the XXV Venice Biennale. Among other works exhibited at the Spanish pavilion is Train in Flames, an enormous triptych that was the focus of an in-depth analysis by critics Luigi Carluccio and Elvira Cassa Salvi. Acting on the advice of James Johnson Sweeney the famous business baron and patron of the arts Joseph Hirshhorn bought this painting and with the remainder of the works shown at the Biennale. The monumental triptych became part of the permanent collection of the Hirshhorn Museum and Sculpture Garden from the day of its opening in 1974. In 1972 Orellana exhibits for the first time with the Turin-based dealer Christian Stein with whom he was to establish a long working relationship. On 3 August 1974, he married Isabel, née Calles, with whom he was to have two children. In 1975 the monograph volume Orellana 1945-75 was presented at the Circulo Internacional de Prensa, Madrid, published by Heliodoro (Madrid). The book included essays by Jose M. Moreno Galvan, Enrico Crispolti, Charles Spencer, Paulino Posade and Vicente Aguilera Cerni. In 1979 he took a studio at the Hotel Chelsea.

The paintings from this period are most remarkable for the vividness of the extreme violence and even the human denigration that is often depicted. Such representations are however, also rich in a lyrical content that was to characterise the artist from then on. The juxtaposition of the international tendencies that formed Orellana took a more definite form in this period: his old Spanish inheritance, the input from America, the wealth of archaeological culture and Italy with Conceptualism and Arte Povera. The artist had a solo show at the stand of Juana Mordo at the Foire Internationale d'Art Contemporain 1978, Paris, France. These amalgamated into a whole that paved the way for new developments in Orellana's work.

== Recent years ==
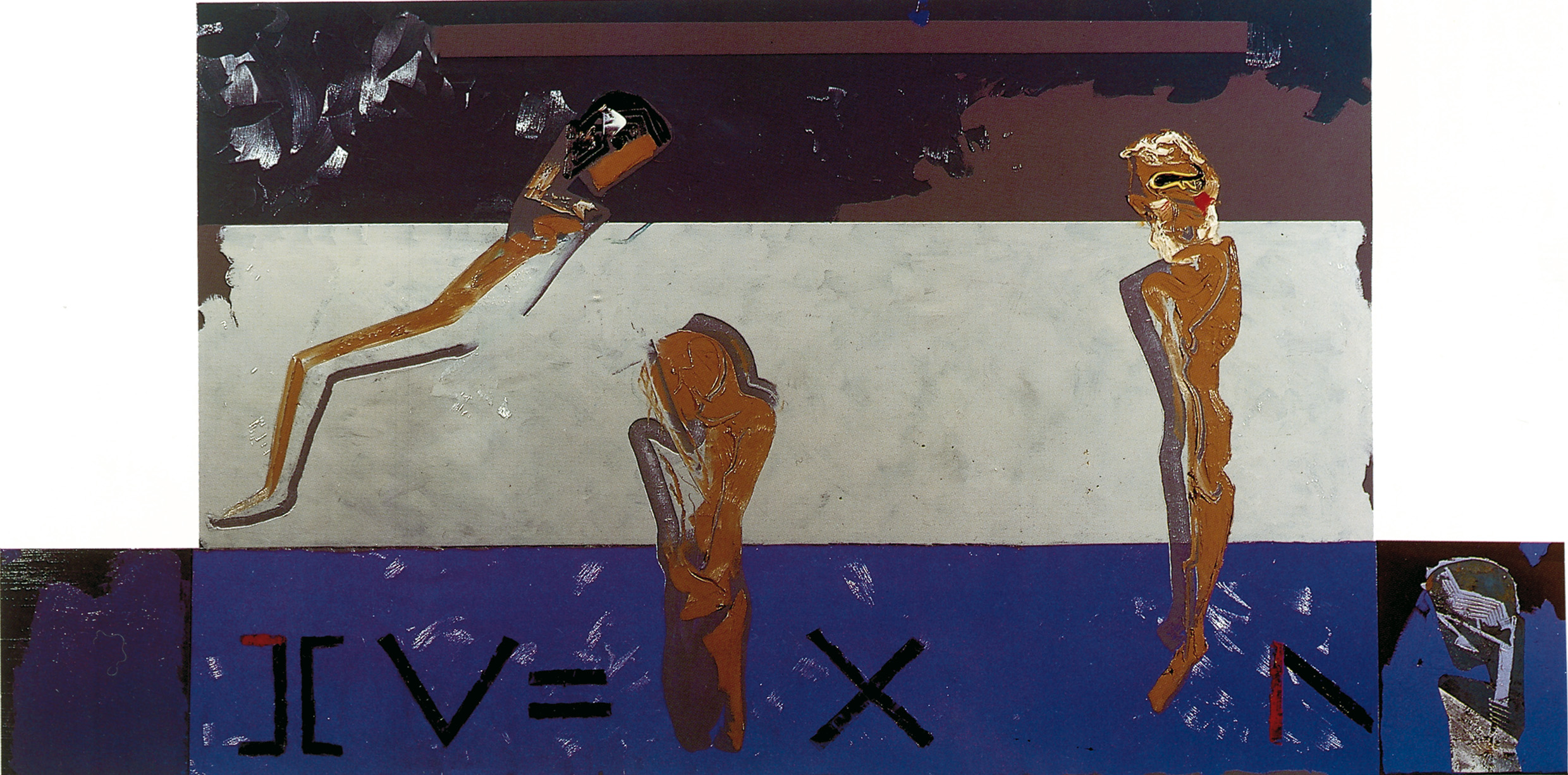
Triptico en forma de T invertida, 1989, Taipei Fine Arts Museum, Taiwan

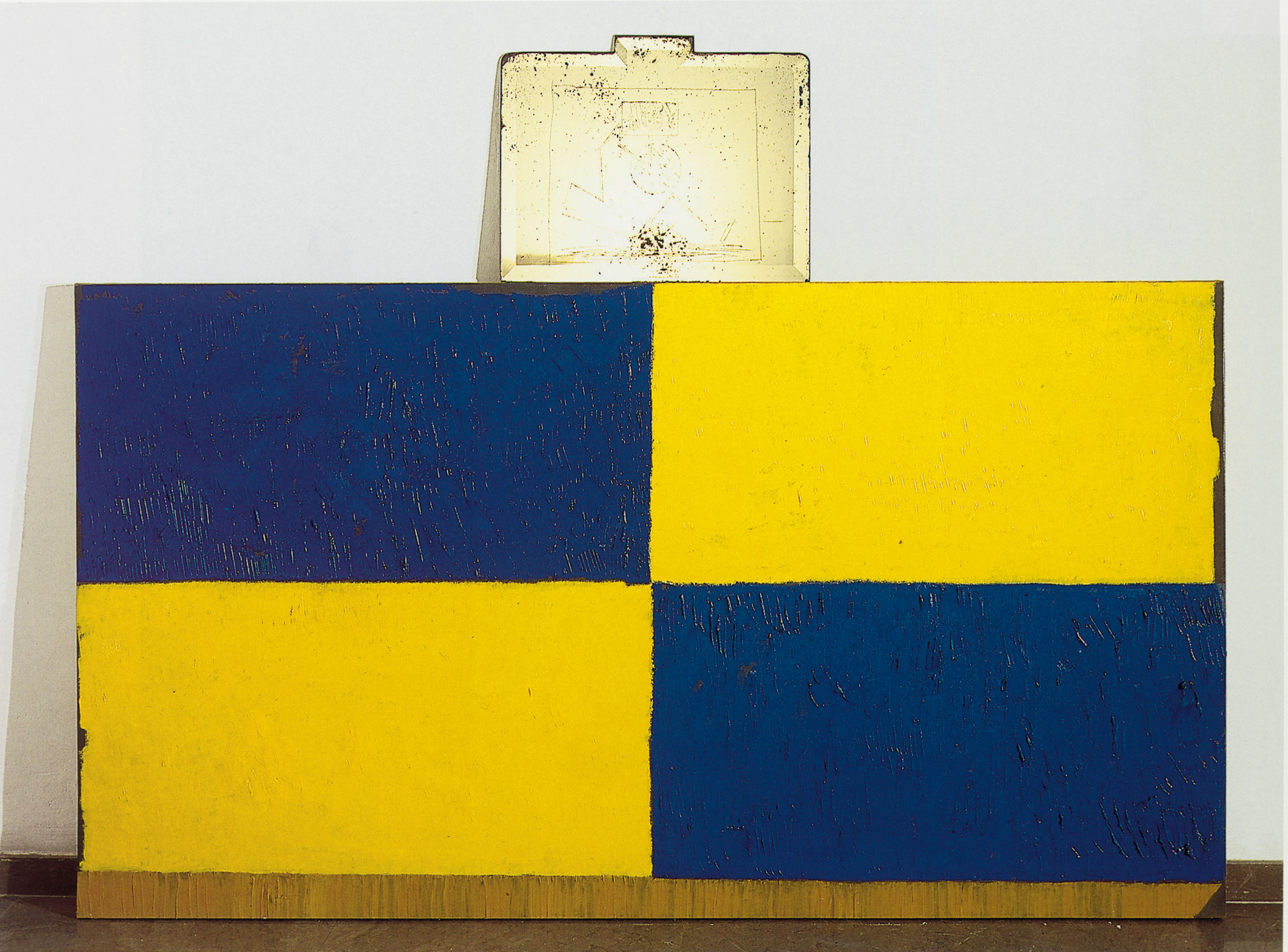
Superpuesto n24 (basado en un tema de Paracas), Trujillo 1997, private collection

Orellana moved back to Europe in 1984, when he lived between his studio in Madrid, Spain, Albisola, Italy. In 1985 he left the other studios, and moved to Riva del Garda, Italy, where he was to enjoy an incredibly prolific artistic period, and where he was regularly visited by critics such as Tommaso Trini and dealers as Herstand from New York and Marconi from Milan as well as eminent international politicians. Orellana and his family moved back to Spain in 1993, where they settled in Trujillo, Extremadura, and then finally in 2000 to France, where he still lives and works.

In 1986 the Museo Español de Arte Contemporaneo hosted an exhibition of his works from 1970 to 1986. In 1991 he exhibited at the Spazio Ansaldo, Milan, in an installation designed by Renzo Piano, and more spectacular was an exhibition at the Taipei Fine Arts Museum, Taipei, Taiwan, which was widely commented upon by the critic Roberto Tassi. In 1995, an incredible exhibition was shown at the Casa Das Artes in Vigo Spain, crucial from a critical point of view, as the critic Marco Ricardo Barnatán wrote in the exhibition catalogue, for its statement of Orellana's renewed aesthetic and realisation ideals and practice, a trait that indeed has marked the work of the artist ever since. Christian Stein, at the gates of the Spanish Pavilion at the 1995 Venice Biennale, declared that "Orellana is the most interesting artist that Spain has created since Tàpies and Miró". In 1998, his gallery, Christian Stein, showed his works in a solo pavilion at the ARCO art fair in Madrid. In a tribute to the power and human drama of Orellana's late 1960s works, a nightmarish 1967 piece was included in the major 2005 exhibition held in Turin titled "Il Male" that comprised works of leading artists from the quattrocento to the present. The curator, Teresa Sacchi Lodispoto, commented "In a nightmarish atmosphere reinforced by a palette of chromatic contrasts of Goya-like memory and in equilibrium between bright chromatism and restrained sobriety, it is impossible to understand what, in effect, is revealed before the eyes of the viewer".

The work of this period shows a marked evolution from the works of the New York years, with colossal ensemblages, graffito technique achieved by scraping the bare oil paint from the canvas, revealing the background, and the collage of various elements, especially metal and ancient mirrors. Exemplary of this initial transition is the series "Bronx Around", exhibited both in Milan and Cáceres, Spain. Jole de Sanna presented the latest works of the artist in the volume "Gaston Orellana Orestea", where she writes that "The entire history of painting and the experience of art during the second half of the XXth Century do not escape being captured by Orellana". Although internationally renowned, there have been few opportunities to see paintings of Gaston Orellana in Britain recently. Since its foundation in 2018, the Archivo Gastón Orellana is the entity responsible for the preservation, protection and dissemination of Gastón Orellana's artistic and intellectual work, including authentication and cataloguing.
