= Rolf Lauter =

German art historian, curator and art advisor

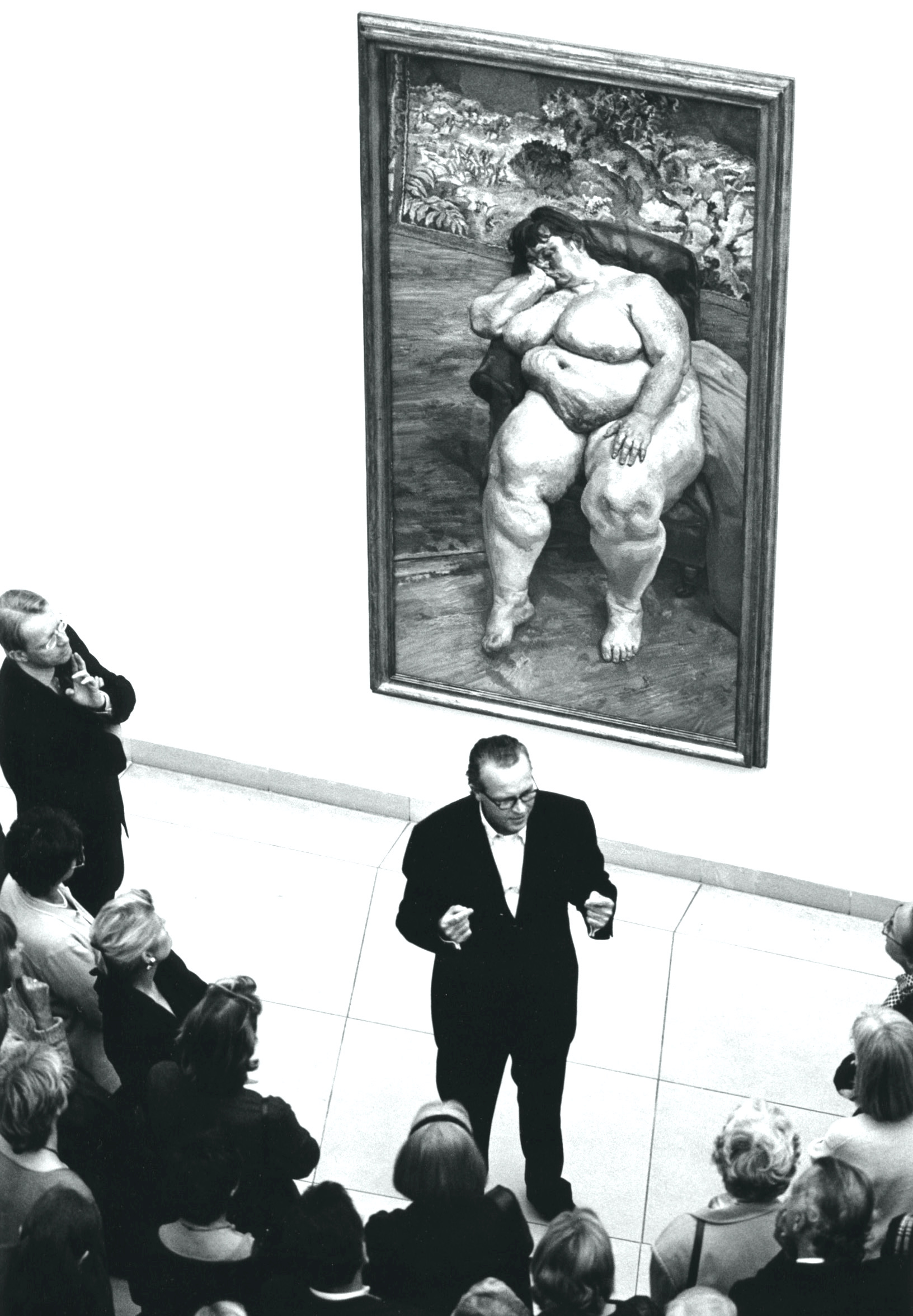
Curator's talk with Rolf Lauter at the exhibition Lucian Freud: Naked Portraits, Museum für Moderne Kunst, Frankfurt am Main, October 2000. The photo shows Lauter in front of Lucian Freud's painting "Sleeping by the Lion Carpet" (1995–96, Oil on canvas, 256,5 x 143,5 cm, Private Collection, USA).

Rolf Dieter Lauter (born December 3, 1952, in Mannheim) is a German art historian, curator, and art advisor.

== Early years ==
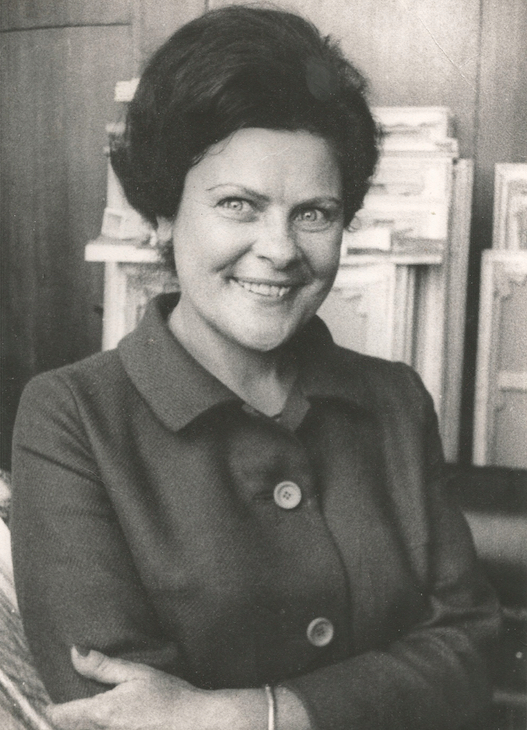
Mother Margarete Lauter 1967

Lauter already worked during high school at Johann-Sebastian-Bach Gymnasium (1963–1970) as Assistant Curator and from 1972 to 1984 during his studies as Curator of Exhibitions in the Galerie Margarete Lauter in Mannheim. From 1972 he studied art history, classical archeology, Christian archeology, Romance languages, and literature and philosophy at the Heidelberg University and University of Göttingen. With Prof. Peter Anselm Riedl in Heidelberg, he received his Ph.D. in 1984 on “Variable Sculpture in 20th Century”.

== Career ==
=== Museum für Moderne Kunst MMK Frankfurt (1984-2002) ===
Peter Iden Founding Director of the MMK Museum für Moderne Kunst Frankfurt (1978–1988) and Hilmar Hoffmann (Councillor and Head of the Department of Culture Frankfurt 1970–1990) appointed Lauter in 1984 as the first Curator of the Museum für Moderne Kunst in Frankfurt. 1984-1991 Lauter was coordinator for architecture of the new building in cooperation with the Museum Architect Hans Hollein and Roland Burgard Head of the Frankfurt Building Department. With the Directorate of Jean-Christophe Ammann at the MMK (1989–2001) Lauter was appointed Chief Curator and deputy director responsible for the central organisation and special exhibitions. Between 1985 and 2002 Lauter curated amongst others the exhibitions: Carl Andre: Extraneous roots, Frankfurt (1991); Neo Rauch, Jürgen Ponto-Stiftung / Dresdner Bank AG, Frankfurt am Main (1993); Kunst in Frankfurt 1945 bis heute (1994–1995; Views from Abroad: European Perspectives on American Art, Whitney Museum, New York & Museum für Moderne Kunst, Frankfurt (1996/97); Alighiero Boetti: Mettere al Mondo il Mondo, Frankfurt (1998); Bill Viola: A 25 Year Survey Exhibition, Frankfurt (1999); Dan Flavin: Two Primary Series and one Secondary, Frankfurt (1999); Eric Fischl: A Travel of Romance, Frankfurt (2000); Lucian Freud: Naked Portraits, Frankfurt 2000/2001); Jeff Wall: Figures and Places, Frankfurt (2001). Establishment of Karl-Ströher-Prize in the MMK in cooperation with Karl-Ströher-Stiftung Darmstadt in 1987. Between 1991 and 2001 XX Change of Scene exhibitions took place, a concept developed by Ammann. In 1999 establishment of new “Project Space Old Customs Building” for exhibitions, Film and Video Program “Screenings”. In October 2002 Lauter left to become Director of Kunsthalle Mannheim.

=== Galerie Jahrhunderthalle Hoechst (1987-2002) ===
Since 1987 appointed Curator of MMK exhibitions at Galerie Jahrhunderthalle Hoechst in Frankfurt (1987–2002) in collaboration with Michael Hocks, Director and authorised representative for the Concert and Congress Center Jahrhunderthalle. Exhibitions curated by Lauter were among others: Charlotte Posenenske, 1990; Das MMK in der Galerie Jahrhunderthalle Hoechst: Silvia Bächli, Heiner Blum, Walter Dahn, Peter Rösel, Manfred Stumpf, 1993. Zeitgenössische Kunst aus Frankfurter Banken, 1994; Das Museum für Moderne Kunst und die Sammlung Ströher, 1994/1995; Querpass I. MMK und Städel im Dialog, 1997; Bill Viola – Video, Jahrhunderthalle Hoechst, Mitgliederversammlung 1997; Querpass II. MMK und Städel im Dialog, 1997–98; Alighiero Boetti: Mettere al Mondo il Mondo, 1998; horizontal – vertikal (1998).

=== Kunsthalle Mannheim (2002-2007) ===
Dieter Hasselbach, Chairman of the Friends of the Kunsthalle Mannheim (2002–2016) and Peter Kurz, Head of the Department of Culture and Mayor of Mannheim (2007–present) appointed Lauter in 2002 as Director of the Kunsthalle Mannheim (2002–2007). From 2003, Lauter canceled the chronological presentation of the collection and expanded with new media and permanent private loans to individually unique cross-over constellations. Establishment of “Hector Creativity Center” and “Hector Research Center” as well as of “Metzler Salon” in the Museum's Old Library 2004–2006. Concept for new Museum building with the British Architect David Adjaye. With “Full House: Faces of a Collection” exhibition in 2006 and “100 Years Kunsthalle Mannheim” in 2007 Lauter completed his new museum concept with an international crossover presentation of the entire collection. In the fall of 2007, Lauter was released from the municipal council by the management of the Kunsthalle due to budget overdrafts.

=== Cultural Representative of Fine Arts of the City of Mannheim 2008-2009 ===
From 2008 to 2009 Lauter was conceptualizing of numerous approaches to the cultural development of the City of Mannheim. Realization of "artscoutone” (2009/2010), a comprehensive overview exhibition with site-specific works and installations of 100 contemporary artists of the Rhine-Neckar Metropol Region presented at 17 off site locations in order to create the URBAN SPACE AS CULTURAL SPACE. 2010 Lauter became Curator and managing director of Swiss Art Institution Karlsruhe.

== Other roles ==
- 1975 & 1976 Assistant Curator at the Wallraf-Richartz-Museum/Museum Ludwig, Cologne.
- 1990-91 Zeitgenössische Kunst im städtischen Raum, City Centre Frankfurt/Main.
- 1989-1994 Guest Professor for Contemporary Art at the Universität Marburg and 2003–2006 at the Universität Mannheim.
- 1997-2002 Coordinator of Urban Culture Development on behalf of Mayor Petra Roth and Founding Concept of “Culture Mile Braubachstrasse Frankfurt”
- 2003 Curator of Blickachsen 4, Sculpture Park Bad Homburg.
- 2005-2010 member of the Scientific Committee at the Museo d'Arte Moderna Rovereto (MART)
- New Exhibition Concept Temporäre Kunsthalle Berlin (2009).
- 2010-2014 Founder and managing director of artlabmannheim, artlabheidelberg and artlabberlin, new art-laboratory platforms to promote young art and creativity.
- Editor of Positions in Contemporary Art.

== Personal life ==
From his father, Harro Lauter, who was a representative in the management of the Mannheim Building Department since the 1950s, Lauter learned the theory and practice of architecture. His mother, Margarete Lauter, accompanied Lauter in her gallery for contemporary art from 1963 to 1984. During his studies in Heidelberg he married Caterina Maderna, professor of classical archeology at the University of Heidelberg. Their son Alban Lauter (*1984) lives in Heidelberg. Lauter lives and works today in Zürich, Switzerland.
