= Manolo Millares =

Spanish painter

- Born: January 17, 1926; Las Palmas de Gran Canaria, Canary Islands, Spain
- Died: August 14, 1972 (aged 46); Madrid, Spain
- Known for: Painting
- Movement: Abstract art

Manolo Millares (17 January 1926 – 14 August 1972) was a Spanish painter.

== Biography ==
Self-taught as an artist, Millares was introduced to Surrealism in 1948. In 1953, he moved to Madrid and became an abstract painter. In 1957, Millares along with other artists founded the avant-garde group El Paso (The Step) in Madrid. The members of El Paso at the time of signing the manifesto and in their first exhibitions as a group were the painters Rafael Canogar, Luis Feito, Juana Francés, Manolo Millares, Manuel Rivera, Antonio Suárez, Antonio Saura and the sculptor Pablo Serrano. After showing his work in San Pablo in 1957, Millares' work was introduced to the United States in 1958. He attained an international reputation by the early 1960s, and had a solo show at the Pierre Matisse Gallery in New York in 1961.

== Work ==
Millares, one of the most important Spanish painters of the postwar period 1945, is renowned for his spectacular collages created using a burlap sack. The burlap, sometimes colorless, was stretched, the pieces roughly sewn together to create tears and voids. His vital and body painting, in dark tones, black, white and red, splashed and flowed on the surface. Made for the first time in 1953, the jute fabrics are deeply rooted in the prehistory of the Canary Islands, in particular that of the natives, the Guanches. The embalmed corpses of this pre-Hispanic people were known to him thanks to the vast exhibitions housed at the Museo Canario de Las Palmas. Millares is associated with the informal movement, which has emphasized gestural experimentation and political engagement, and is seen as largely responsible for the revival of modern Spanish art. He developed his own visual language inspired by the pre-Hispanic people, whose organic forms painted on the walls of the caves he reconciled with the automatism of the surrealists. Millares therefore combined tradition and direct expression, prehistory and contemporary symbolism in an extremely individual way.

== Career ==
The 1957 Ateneo de Madrid exhibition of his jute canvases and his registration for the Venice Biennale the same year earned him international recognition and the galleries Pierre Matisse and Daniel Cordier signed agreements with him in 1959. In 1960, Millares presented his first solo exhibition at the Pierre Matisse Galerie, New York. He participated in the exhibition European Art Today: 35 Painters and Sculptors at the Minneapolis Institute of Arts, in 1959, and in Before Picasso: After Miró at the Solomon R. Guggenheim Museum, New York (1960). Millares' work has been included in group exhibitions in the United States throughout his life. In 1970 he produced a film about his life and work, filmed by his wife Elvireta Escobio, which showed paintings interspersed with images of war, fascism and desolate landscapes.

In Spain his work was represented since 1964 by the Galeriá Juana Mordó. One of the last exhibitions before his death in 1972 and with over 40 paintings and gouaches a comprehensive overview took place from September 24 to November 4, 1971 in the Gallery of Margarete Lauter in Mannheim in collaboration with Juana Mordó. The paintings from Millares's last creative years were finally on view in his last exhibition during his lifetime from November 23, 1971 to January 9, 1972 in the Musée d'Art Moderne de la Ville de Paris.

Posthumous exhibitions have taken place at the Pierre Matisse Gallery, New York (1974), at the Museo Nacional Centro de Arte Reina Sofía, Madrid (1992), the Museo de Arte Abstracto Español, Cuenca (1996), Museu Fundación Juan March, Palma (1997), and at the Sen-oku Hakuko Kan Museum, Tokyo (2003). In 2004, Alfonso de la Torre's catalog raisonné of the paintings of Millares was published by the Fundacion Azcona and the Museo Nacional Centro de Arte Reina Sofía.

== Literature ==
- Millares: Obra en Canarias, works from collections in the Canary Islands, october-december 1989, ISBN 978-8487137242
- França, José-Augusto : Millares, Éditions Cercle d'art, Paris, 1991.
- Millares: Museo Nacional Reina Sofia, Madrid, 9 de enero-16 de marzo, 1992. ISBN 978-8480260008
- Schurr, Gérald : Le guidargus de la peinture, Les Éditions de l'Amateur, 1993.
- Bénézit, Emmanuel : Dictionnaire des peintres, sculpteurs, dessinateurs, graveurs, Gründ, 1999.
- Jean-Pierre Delarge, Dictionnaire des arts plastiques modernes et contemporains, Gründ, 2001.
- Manolo Millares, luto de Oriente y Occidente, Madrid 2003. ISBN 978-8496008229
- De la Torre, A. : Manolo Millares, pintura, catálogo razonado. Madrid, Museo Nacional Centro de Arte Reina Sofía, 2004. ISBN 978-84-8026-236-1
- Manolo Millares - Antoni Tàpies: An Informel Step, De Sarthe Gallery, Hong Kong 2019.
