= Gustavo Torner =

Spanish painter and sculptor (1925–2025)

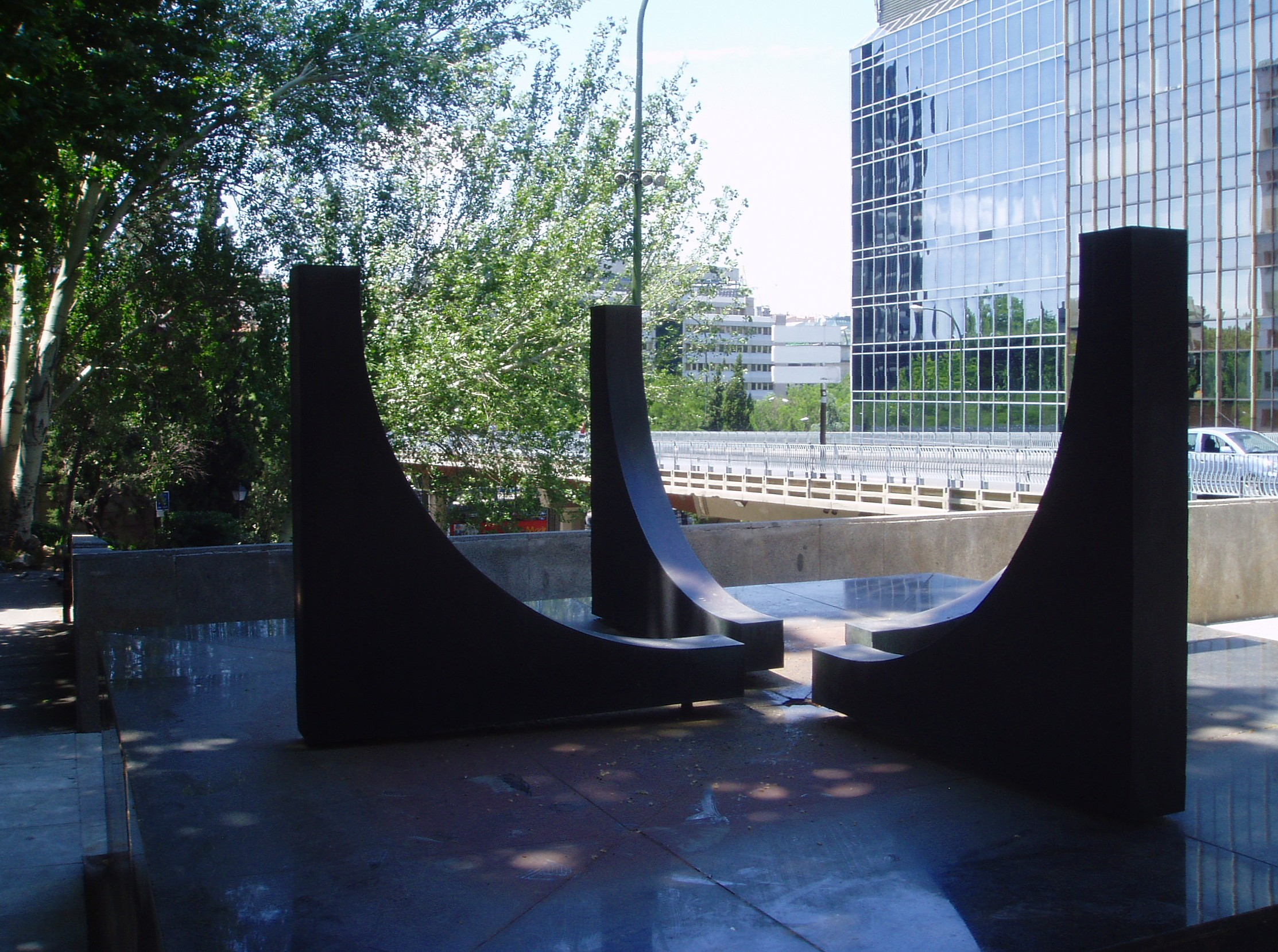
- Escultura-Plaza by Torner
- Born: 13 July 1925; Cuenca, Spain
- Died: 6 September 2025 (aged 100); Cuenca, Spain
- Occupations: Painter; Sculptor

Gustavo Torner (13 July 1925 – 6 September 2025) was a Spanish painter and sculptor.

Together with Gerardo Rueda and Fernando Zóbel de Ayala y Montojo, he was one of the key figures in bringing modern art to Spain, notably participating in the foundation of the Museo de Arte Abstracto Español.

== Biography ==
Born in Cuenca on 13 July 1925, Torner's early works focused on themes of nature. He created pieces in the Plaza de los Cubos and the Serranía de Cuenca. In 1987, he was awarded the Gold Medal of Merit in the Fine Arts by the Ministry of Culture. In 1991, he co-created stained glass windows for the Cuenca Cathedral with Henri Déchanet. From 2005 to 2011, the church of Saint Paul in Cuenca held the Espacio Torner.

Torner died in Cuenca on 6 September 2025, at the age of 100.
