= Lucio Muñoz =

Spanish artist (1929–1998)

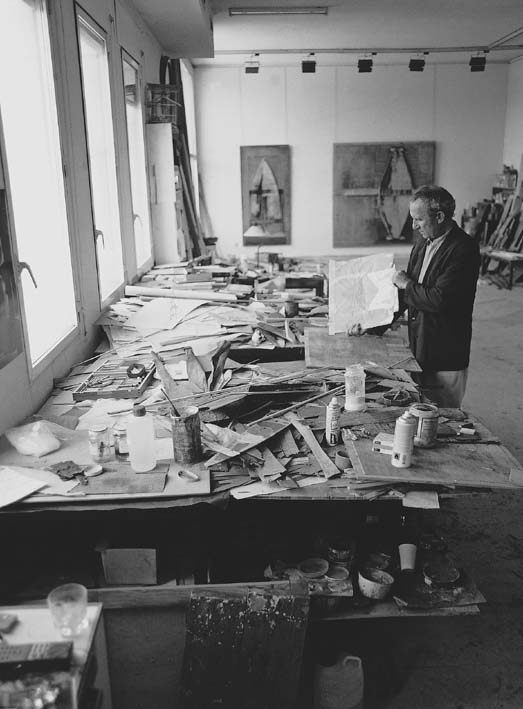
- Lucio Muñoz in his studio, 1990s
- Born: 27 December 1929; Madrid, Spain
- Died: 24 May 1998 (aged 68); Madrid, Spain
- Education: Real Academia de Bellas Artes de San Fernando
- Known for: Abstract painting
- Movement: Art informel
- Awards: Neblí Award for Painting; Gold medal, Salzburg Biennial of Sacred Art; National Award for the Plastic Arts; Spanish Association of Art Critics
- Website: www.luciomunoz.com

Lucio Muñoz (27 December 1929 – 24 May 1998) was a Spanish abstract painter and engraver.

== Biography ==
Muñoz was the son of Lucio Muñoz, a shopkeeper, and Nicolasa Martínez. Born on 27 December 1929 in Madrid, he was the youngest of two brothers and three sisters. His mother died in 1935.

In 1949, Muñoz enrolled at the Royal Academy of Fine Arts in San Fernando, Cádiz, where he obtained a degree in Fine Arts. While at the school, he met Amalia Avia; they married on 15 January 1960. The first of their four children was born that year.

== Art ==
Muñoz's first one-man exhibition was at the Sala de la Direccion General de Bellas Artes in Madrid, in 1955.

During a stay in Paris financed by a Spanish government scholarship in 1955–6, Muñoz was influenced by the art informel movement. He worked with various materials, such as burnt paper and wood, in addition to canvas. He pierced, bent, and made cuts in the canvas, like informalist artists. He is particularly known for his innovation in his works on wood, which he fully incorporated into the works; burns, carving, and paint mixed with materials such as marble dust, sawdust, and pulverized minerals were among the techniques he used to create the works he referred to as pseudo-paintings.

His works are in informal colours, with black predominating. The style of his later works was less aggressive, because he used other materials.

In 1964, Galería Juana Mordó was opened. He belonged to the associated group of painters from the moment of its foundation until 1991.

His works include murals for the European Union building in Brussels and the chamber of the Madrid Parliament. His mural at the Basilica of Aránzazu won the Gold Medal at the Salzburg Biennial of Sacred Art.
