= Antonio Saura =

Spanish painter

- Born: Antonio Saura Atarés; 22 September 1930; Huesca, Spain
- Died: 22 July 1998 (aged 67); Cuenca, Spain
- Known for: Painting
- Movement: Surrealism
- Spouses: Gunhild Madeleine Augot; Mercedes Beldarraín Jiménez
- Children: 3
- Relatives: Carlos Saura (brother)

Antonio Saura Atarés (September 22, 1930 – July 22, 1998) was a Spanish artist and writer, one of the major post-war painters to emerge in Spain in the fifties whose work has marked several generations of artists and whose critical voice is often remembered.

== Biography ==
He began painting and writing in 1947 in Madrid while suffering from tuberculosis, having already been confined to his bed for five years. In his beginnings he created numerous drawings and paintings with a dreamlike surrealist character that most often represented imaginary landscapes, employing a flat smooth treatment that offers a rich palette of colors. He claimed Hans Arp and Yves Tanguy as his artistic influences.

He stayed in Paris in 1952 and in 1954–1955 during which he met Benjamin Péret and associated with the Surrealists, although he soon parted with the group, joining instead the company of his friend the painter Simon Hantaï. Using the technique of scraping, he adopted a gestural style and created an abstract type of painting, still very colorful with an organic, aleatory design.

The first appearances in his work of forms that will soon become archetypes of the female body or the human figure occur in the mid-1950s. Starting in 1956 Saura tackled the register of what will prove to be his greatest works: women, nudes, self-portraits, shrouds and crucifixions, which he painted on both canvas and paper. In 1957 in Madrid he founded the El Paso Group and served as its director until it broke up in 1960. During this period Saura met Michel Tapié.

During the 1950s he had his first solo exhibition at the Rodolphe Stadler Gallery in Paris, where he regularly exhibited throughout his life. Stadler introduced him to Otto van de Loo in Munich and Pierre Matisse in New York City, both of whom exhibited his work and represented him, and eventually his paintings were collected by major museums.

Limiting his palette to blacks, grays and browns, Saura asserted a personal style that was independent of the movements and trends of his generation. His work followed in the tradition of Velasquez and Goya. Starting in 1959 he began creating a prolific body of works in print, illustrating numerous books including Cervantes's Don Quijote, Orwell's Nineteen Eighty-Four, Nöstlinger's adaptation of Pinocchio, Kafka's Tagebücher, Quevedo's Three Visions, and many others.

In 1960 Saura began creating sculptures made of welded metal elements which represented the human figure, characters and crucifixions. In 1967 he settled permanently in Paris, and joined the opposition to Francoist Spain. In France he participated in numerous debates and controversies in the fields of politics, aesthetics and artistic creation. He also broadened his thematic and pictorial register. Along with his Femmefauteuil (literally "Womanarmchair"), he also worked on the series "Imaginary Portraits", and Goya's Dog and Imaginary Portraits of Goya begin to take shape.

In 1971 he temporarily abandoned painting on canvas to devote himself to writing, drawing and painting on paper. In 1977, Rolf Lauter and Antonio Saura met for the first time in the Rodolphe Stadler gallery Paris and started a dialogue and a long-standing friendship. In 1979, the collaboration gave rise to the first major retrospective at the Galerie de Margarete Lauter Mannheim with more than 50 images and drawings, followed by many other presentations. In 1989 Lauter - then Chief Curator of the Museum für Moderne Kunst Frankfurt - has been co-organizer with Katharina Winnekes of the Frankfurt exhibition The Abused Man with works by Saura, Millares and Canogar. In 1977 Saura began publishing his writings, and he created several stage designs for the theatre, ballet and opera, thanks to the collaboration with his brother, the film director Carlos Saura. From 1983 to his death in 1998, he revisited all of his themes and figures.

== Individual exhibitions ==
- Museum of Contemporary Art, Madrid (1956)
- Galerie Stadler, Paris (1957 & 1979)
- Galerie Van de Loo, Munich (1959)
- Pierre Matisse Gallery, NY (1961)
- The Stedelijk Museum, Eindhoven (1963)
- The Rotterdamsche Kunsling (1963)
- The Musée de Buenos Aires (1963)
- The Musée de Rio de Janeiro (1963)
- The Stedelijk Museum, Amsterdam (1964)
- The Kunsthalle, Baden-Baden (1964)
- The Konsthallen, Göteborg (1964)
- Institute of Contemporary Art, London (1965)
- Galerie Maeght, Barcelona (1975 & 1984)
- Galerie Lauter, Mannheim (1979)
- The Abbaye de Sénanque, Gordes (1985)
- Galerie Lauter Mannheim (1985–1986)
- The Wiener Secession, Viena (1989)
- Harvard University, Cambridge (1989)
- Musée d'art et d'histoire, Geneva; MNCARS, Madrid; Lenbachhaus, Munich & Réfectoire des Jacobins, Toulouse (1989)
- Museum of Modern Art, Lugano (1994)
- Galerie Daniel Lelong, Paris (1997)
- Fundación Juan March Madrid (2005)
- Kunstmuseum Bern, Bern (2012)

== Bibliography ==
- Saura in Cuenca, monograph. Phrases: Georgina Oliver - images: Félix Rozen. Borgen. Copenhagen, 1983 (limited edition: 1000 copies)
