= Patricia Mayayo =

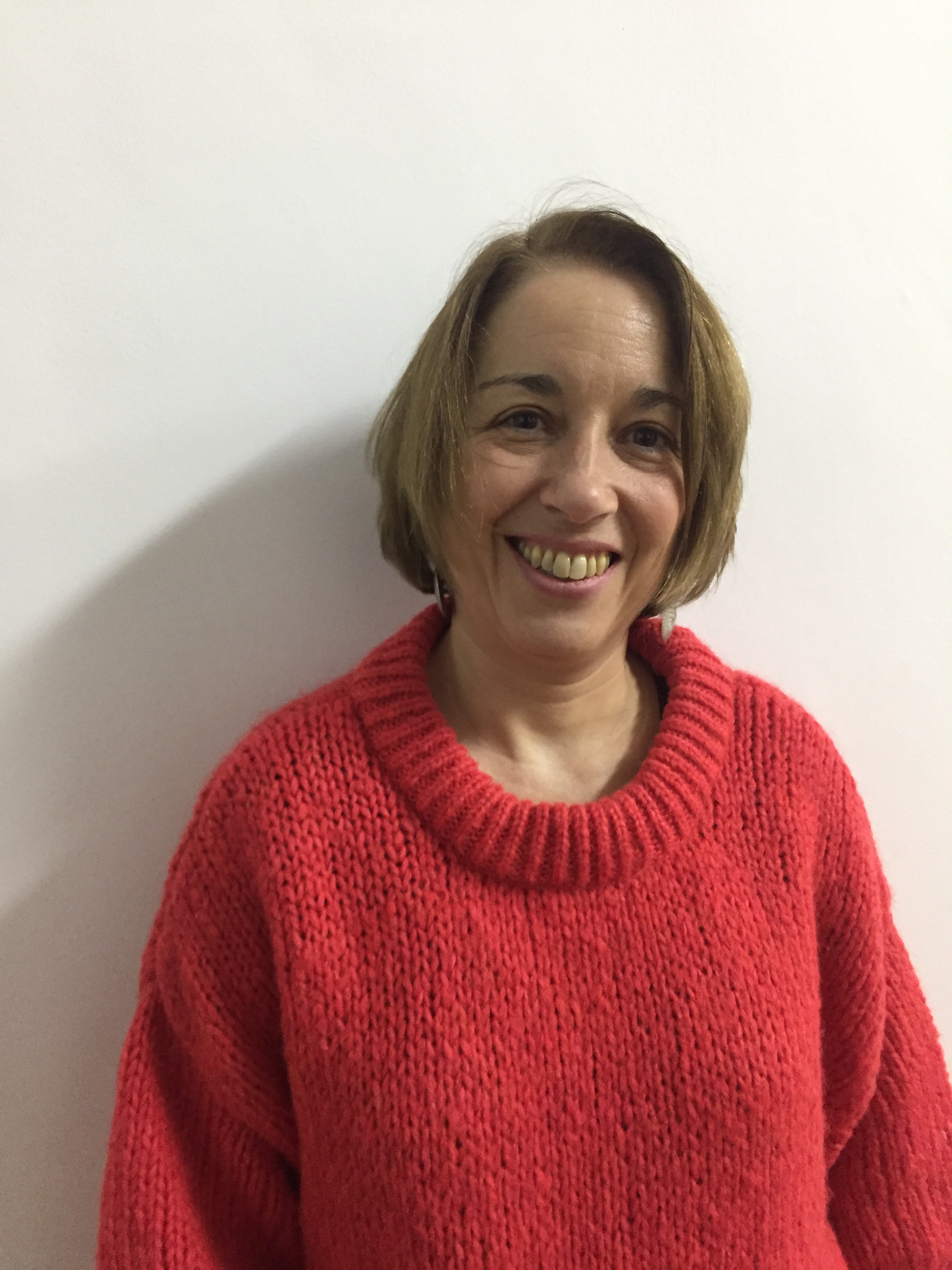
- Born: Patricia Mayayo Bost; 1967 (age 58–59); Madrid, Spain
- Occupation: Art historian
- Known for: Co-founder, Asociación de Mujeres en las Artes Visuales

Academic background
- Education: Autonomous University of Madrid

Academic work
- Sub-discipline: historiography of feminist and queer art; history of women artists; contemporary artistic practices
- Institutions: Autonomous University of Madrid
- Notable works: Co-curator, "Feminist genealogies in Spanish art 1960-2010"

Patricia Mayayo Bost (born 1967) is a Spanish art historian, professor, and researcher. Her areas of research and study include the historiography of feminist and queer art, the history of women artists, and contemporary artistic practices.

== Biography ==
Patricia Mayayo Bost was born in Madrid, 1967. She holds a Ph.D. in Art History from the Autonomous University of Madrid (UAM) and an M.A. in Art History from Case Western Reserve University (Ohio, USA). Between 1998 and 2006, she was a professor of Art History at the European University of Madrid (UEM) and is currently a full professor at UAM. She was the coordinator of the University master's degree in Contemporary Art History and Visual Culture, which is taught at the Museo Nacional Centro de Arte Reina Sofía (MNCARS).

She has been part of the research projects El sistema del arte en España, 1975-2005, and Larga exposición: las narraciones del arte contemporáneo español para los grandes públicos, financed by the Ministry of Education. She has directed courses on gender differences and their representation in art and cinema for different museums and contemporary Spanish art centers.

Mayayo collaborated in the realization of the feminism itinerary for the permanent collection at MNCARS, which questions the visibility and role of women in the History of Art. This itinerary was written by Marian Lopez Fernandez-Cao and was presented for the first time in 2009 at MNCARS.

In 2009, Mayayo was one of the founders of the Asociación de Mujeres en las Artes Visuales along with Rocio de la Villa and was a member of the board of directors. In 2012–2013, with Juan Vicente Aliaga, Mayayo curated the exhibition "Feminist genealogies in Spanish art 1960-2010", at the Museo de Arte Contemporáneo de Castilla y León, León, Spain, with the participation of, among others, Eva Lootz, Marisa Gonzalez, Paloma Navares, Esther Ferrer, Carmen Calvo, Carmela García, Paz Muro, and Marina Núñez. The exhibition proposed a review of the role of feminist discourses in the Spanish context from the sixties to 2010.

== Exhibitions ==
- "Feminist genealogies in Spanish art 1960-2010", 2012–13, Museo de Arte Contemporáneo de Castilla y León

== Selected works ==
=== Books ===
- Louise Bourgeoi, 1990, ISBN 84-89569-81-9
- André Masson : mitologías, 2002 ISBN 9788469972847
- Historias de mujeres, historias del arte, 2003, ISBN 9788437620640
- Frida Kahlo : contra el mito, 2008, ISBN 978-84-376-2452-5
- Cuerpos sexuados, cuerpos de (re)producción, 2011, ISBN 9788493880231
- Genealogías feministas en el arte español (with Juan Vicente Aliaga), 2013, ISBN 978-84-934916-6-6

=== Articles ===
- "Barcelona en blanco y negro : la politización del debate urbano en el entorno de la 'gauche divine'", Arte, Individuo y Sociedad, 32, 1 July 2020 ISSN 1131-5598
