= Feminist genealogies in Spanish art 1960–2010 =

Feminist art exhibition in Spain

Feminist genealogies in the spanish art 1960–2010, in Spanish, Genealogías feministas en el arte español: 1960–2010 was an exhibition held from 24 June 2012 to 24 February 2013 at the Contemporary Art Museum of Castilla y León (Museo de Arte Contemporáneo de Castilla y León - MUSAC), in León, Spain. It was developed by Patricia Mayayo and Juan Vicente Aliaga, who are curators and academic university teachers and researchers, and showcased over 150 works by 80 artists. The exhibition originated from extended research, ended in a publication with the same title, in which the leading specialists in the field collaborated, such as Rocio de la Villa, Isabel Tejeda, Beatriz Preciado, Noemí de Haro, among others.

== Exhibition ==
The exhibition Genealogías feministas, as well as the publication, are a unique research in the artistic Spanish field. Both the exhibition and the book are a platform that deal with the main themes of feminism. The history from the 1960s until 2010. The main art historians contribute with their texts, to give them the support in history. It covers from those artists working under Franco's dictatorship, how their work survived under such repression, another recurrent subject was the identity, gender, the role the women in the XX century, until the feminist revolution.

Throughout the duration of the exhibition, talks, seminars, conferences about the subject were programmed.

As a complement to the exhibition, two seminars were held at the Reina Sofía Museum in Madrid, followed by another one at the MUSAC in León in February 2013.

== Publication ==
The book with the same title, was edited by the same authors of the exhibition, Mayayo and Aliaga. The content of the book is a teoric and graphic research with a variety of texts on feminism. It is not only a catalogue of the exhibition, but a publication with essays from relevant feminists.

The book was organised in two parts.

=== Part 1 -Stories ===
- Imaging new genealogies by Patricia Mayayo

- What the works oozes by Juan Vicente Aliaga

- Feminism in exhibition discourses and museographic stories in Spain by Olga Fernández López

=== Part II- Routes ===
- Women artists and images of female oppression in critical realism by Noemí de Haro García
- Spanish artists under Franco dictatorship by Isabel Tejeda
- Feminism and art in Catalonia in the 1960s and 1970s by Assumpta Bassas Vila
- Around the nineties generation by Rocío de la Villa
- Occupy sex. Notes from the revolution feministapornopunk by Beatriz Preciado

== Participants in the exhibition ==
The participants covered a wide spectrum in terms of ages and artistic languages, but mainly involved artists, both male and female, who, through their commitment, have contributed to building a feminist language that fights to reduce gender inequality. Some participating artists also represented individual sexual orientation and gender diversity.

Works by the main artists on the Spanish art scene were shown throughout the entire museum, from one end of the building to the other, and ranging from the realism of the 60s to conceptual art and all the way up to movements in the XXI century. Participants included Esther Ferrer, Carmen Calvo, Paz Muro, Carlos Pazos, Miguel Benlloch, Mari Chordà, Marisa González, Isabel Villar, Eulàlia Valldosera, Cristina Lucas, Ana Navarrete, Juan Hidalgo, Mau Monleón, Alicia Framis, Paloma Navares, and Marina Núñez, among others.
