= Asociación de Mujeres en las Artes Visuales =

Organization of female visual artists

Association MAV (Mujeres en las Artes Visuales) is a group of more than 500 visual arts professionals women in Spain that promotes the visibility and improvement of opportunities for women in the arts. The association was founded on May 9, 2009, at La Casa Encendida in Madrid by a group of contemporary female artists led by professor and art critic Rocio de la Villa.

== Objectives ==
The Association MAV (Mujeres en las Artes Visuales) promotes initiatives to foster the participation of women in culture and to combat discrimination in accordance with the Organic Act 1/2004 on Integral Protection Measures against Gender Violence.

Through its Observatorio, MAV analyzes and provides objective, numeric data to inform the situation of visual arts professionals in Spain.

Acknowledging the low number of women in top positions in arts and culture, the MAV seeks to balance the presence of Spanish women in all sectors of contemporary art (e.g., artists, gallerists, researchers, curators, professors, art managers, museum directors) and advocate with Spanish institutions for the implementation of gender equality policies in all types of arts.

The MAV Association has established collaborations with other organizations of women in culture and contemporary art to develop initiatives towards tackling the lack of participation of women in the art system.

Through its Centre of Documentation, the MAV Association provides resources for the investigation and documentation of best labour practices, and for the creation of new projects in the field of art, gender and feminism.

The Centre of Documentation also preserves the historical memory of women's participation in the arts. It has created a chronological chart about art, woman and feminism in Spain and internationally.

== Projects ==
Mujeres en las Artes Visuales improves the visibility of women in the arts and inform of their professional activities and productions on its website.

Since 2012, it produce an online magazine call "M-Arte Y cultura visual". Through this magazine discusses issues about arts and the visual culture from a gender perspective".

One of the most important projects that MAV has generated is the "Women's gaze festival" (Festival Miradas de Mujeres). Initiated in 2012, to generate exhibitions in Madrid the first year and the next year was taken place all over Spain. The Festival, among exhibitions, has brought together initiatives that make women and gender issues a source for reflection, debate and creation.

Born out of the "Women's gaze festival" (Festival Miradas de Mujeres), the MAV organized from March to December 2016 the Women's Views Biennial, in which multiple activities were organized in several museums, galleries and arts centres all over the world to give visibility and enhance women's presence and works in contemporary art.

The MAV's Prizes are an annual event that celebrates the achievements, contributions and trajectory of women in the arts since 2010.

== Members ==
MAV has over 500 female members. In the meeting in March 2017 a new director team was elected by the members. Maria Jose Magaña as president, Lola Diaz as vice-president, secretary Merce Rodriguez and treasurer Luz Bejarano. Since 2012, until March 2017 the theorist and professor Marian López Fernández-Cao presides the association. The artist Marisa González was appointed vice-president since 2010 until March 2017. In 2014, María José Magaña Clemente was appointed General secretary and Luz Bejarano Coca, treasurer. They are both art historians and cultural managers from the Instituto Cervantes. Other women are part of the board of directors. In May 2020 Vanesa Cejudo became a Vice President of the organisation, having been a member of its board of directors since 2016.

Other important women in contemporary arts and feminism are members at the advisory committee: Marian Lopez Fernandez Cao, Marisa González Margarita Aizpuru, Susana Blas, Concha Jerez, Marina Núñez, Patricia Mayayo, Rocío de la Villa, and Magda Belloti.
