= Avrom Landy =

American historian (1904–1922)

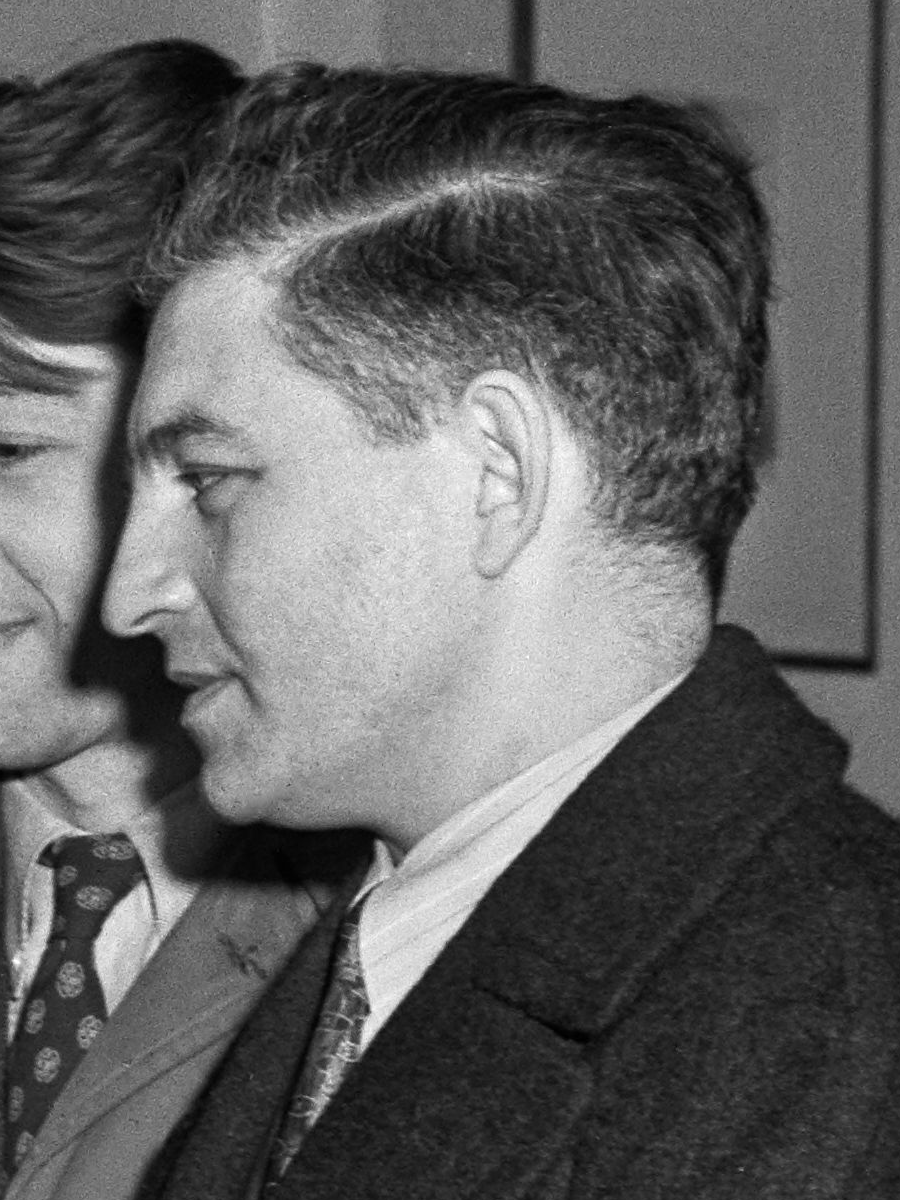
- Landy in 1941
- Born: Avrom Mendel Landy; 1904; Cleveland, Ohio, U.S.
- Died: 1992 (aged 87–88)
- Education: Wisconsin University
- Occupations: Writer and journalist
- Children: Sonia Landy Sheridan
- Writing career
- Language: English
- Genre: History

Avrom Landy (AKA "A. Landy", 1904–1992) was a historian, writer and theorist on American Marxism in the first half of the twentieth century. He was the father of the American artist and researcher professor emeritus of the School of the Art Institute of Chicago, Sonia Landy Sheridan.

== Background ==
Landy was born in Cleveland, Ohio and received a B.A. from Ohio State University and Master of the University of Wisconsin, Madison. Ph.D. in history, philology, the philosophy of language, at Madison University.

== Career ==
At that time he was appointed to the Daily Worker as editor. He was city editor for the Daily Worker for about two years in the early 1930s. He was co-publisher of International Publishers from 1945 until about 1947, when he left the Communist Party. Landy was an influential Marxist thinker during the 1930s and 1940s, especially through his educational and editorial work, and also through his articles in various leftist journals.

He became educational director of the Communist Party of America, a position he held until 1945. He was the Communist Party candidate for New York State Senate 4th District in 1941.

He taught at both Phi Beta Kappa- Ohio State University and The University of Wisconsin.

Landy orientated his daughter Sonia to become a translator in global politics, and he hired her to do the French research for his new book The United States and the Paris Commune of 1871. His daughter tried to get The Paris Commune published in London, England, but it was rejected. She later got it published in Paris in La Pensee.

With the four time election of President Franklin Roosevelt, Landy joined Earl Browder, head of the CPUSA, in believing that the USA was on its own historical destiny, a democratic mix of socialism and capitalism.

== Legacy ==
His archives and documents are at the Northwestern University library "A.Landy Collection" and at the Langlois Foundation, along with his daughter Sonia Landy Sheridan archives in the Sonia's Langlois Foundation Generative Systems records in Montreal, Canada.

== Works ==
=== Books ===
- Marxism and the Democratic Tradition, ASIN: B0014JWIXI, (New York: International Publishers, 1946),
- Marxism and the Woman Question (New York: Worker's Library, 1943).

=== Articles ===
- "A Year of American Slav Unity," The Communist (1943)
