= Cejudo =

Cejudo is a surname. Notable people with the surname include:

== People ==
- Álvaro Cejudo (born 1984), Spanish footballer
- Angel Cejudo, American freestyle wrestler
- Henry Cejudo (born 1987), American mixed martial artist and freestyle wrestler
- Vanesa Cejudo, Spanish sociologist

== Fictional characters ==
- Don Cejudo, one of the main characters of the 1987 Mexican sitcom television series ¡Ah qué Kiko!
