= Juan Vicente Aliaga =

Spanish art critic

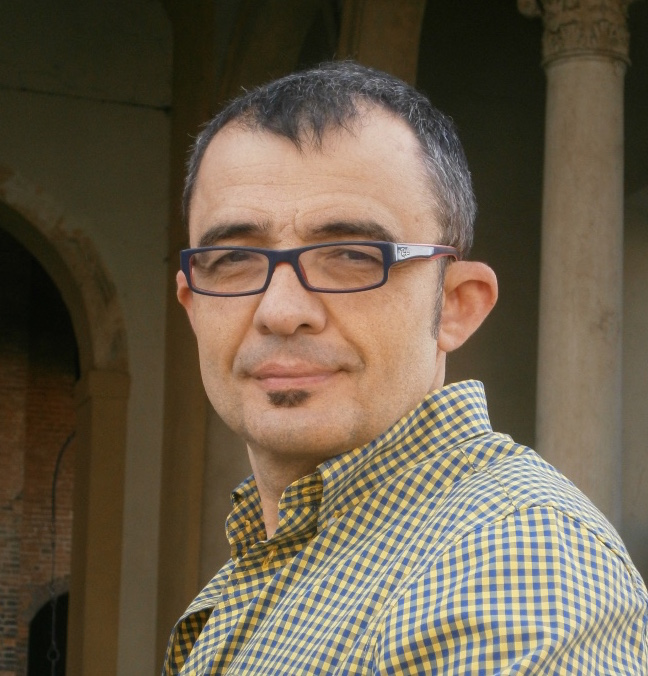
- Born: Juan Vicente Aliaga Espert; 1959 (age 65–66); Valencia, Spain
- Occupations: Professor; art critic

Juan Vicente Aliaga (born 1959) is a Spanish art critic who has written widely on contemporary conceptual art as well as on gender and queer theory. In his pioneer 1997 book Identidad y diferencia: sobre la cultura gay en España, co-authored with José Miguel G. Cortés, he expressed criticism of the assimilationist strategies of mainstream LGBT+ associations in Spain, advocating instead for a politics of difference and the reappropriation of slurs like "marica" and "maricón", similarly to what happened with "queer" in English-speaking countries.

== Publications ==
- Aliaga, Juan Vicente; G. Cortés, José Miguel (1993). De amor y rabia: acerca del arte y el sida. Valencia: Direcció General de Promoció Cultural, Museus i Belles Arts. ISBN 84-482-1609-1.
- Aliaga, Juan Vicente; G. Cortés, José Miguel (1997). Identidad y diferencia: sobre la cultura gay en España. Barcelona: Egales. ISBN 84-7721-222-8.
- Aliaga, Juan Vicente (1997). Bajo vientre: representaciones de la sexualidad en la cultura y el arte contemporáneos. Valencia: Direcció General de Promoció Cultural, Museus i Belles Arts. ISBN 84-482-1609-1.
- Aliaga, Juan Vicente (2004). Arte y cuestiones de género: una travesía del siglo XX. San Sebastián: Nerea. ISBN 84-89569-89-4.
- Aliaga, Juan Vicente (2007). Orden fálico: androcentrismo y violencia de género en las prácticas artísticas del siglo XX. Madrid: Akal. ISBN 978-84-460-2279-4.
- Aliaga, Juan Vicente; Mayayo Bost, Patricia (2013). Genealogías feministas en el arte español. Valladolid: Junta de Castilla y León. ISBN 978-84-934916-6-6.
