= Superman (1979 video game) =

1979 video game

- Developer: Atari, Inc.
- Publishers: Atari, Inc.
- Programmer: John Dunn
- Series: Superman
- Platform: Atari 2600
- Release: September 1979
- Genre: Action-adventure
- Mode: Single-player

Superman is a 1979 action-adventure video game programmed by John Dunn and published by Atari, Inc. for the Atari Video Computer System. (Note: The system became known as the Atari 2600 only after the release of the Atari 5200 in 1982.) The player controls Superman, whose quest is to explore an open-ended environment to find three pieces of a bridge that was destroyed by Lex Luthor, capture Luthor and his criminal gang, and return to the Daily Planet building. The game world is populated by antagonists such as a helicopter that re-arranges the bridge pieces and roving kryptonite satellites that cause Superman to revert into Clark Kent.

At the time of the game's release, Atari was owned by Warner Communications, which was also the parent company of Superman publisher DC Comics. Following the financial success of the film Superman (1978), Atari asked programmer Warren Robinett to adapt his prototype of Adventure (1980) into a Superman game. Robinett was not interested, but gave some of his code to Dunn, who agreed to do the game if he could have four kilobytes of space for the cartridge as opposed to the usual two kilobytes.

Superman received positive reviews on its release from the publications Video and The Space Gamer, who proclaimed it as one of the best games from Atari while noting its high quality graphics and unique gameplay. Some retrospective reviews lamented that the game only used the character of Superman for his more action-oriented abilities, while others continued to praise the game's gameplay and graphics.

== Gameplay ==
Superman (center) flying over the city. The bars at the top represent the criminals (similar to the one on the left side of the screen) who have not been captured yet, and the right top represents the game's timer.

Superman is a video game in which the player controls Clark Kent and his superhero alias Superman. On hearing about a bomb scare in Metropolis, Kent examines the situation and finds Superman's nemesis Lex Luthor leaving the scene as the waterfront bridge explodes. The goal is to repair the bridge, which has split into three parts, capture Luthor and his five henchmen, and return to the Daily Planet as Kent in the shortest time possible. Superman can be damaged by kryptonite satellites; if they touch him, he loses his ability to fly and can only be revived by interacting with Lois Lane. A helicopter moves around Metropolis occasionally moving parts of the bridge around the map. To capture a crook or carry bridge pieces, the player must fly into them to grab them and release them by landing. Luthor and his henchmen are placed in jail by flying them into the jail bars while carrying them.

The game was made prior to the introduction of side-scrolling, leading to the player moving from screen to screen and arriving on the next frame for them to enter a new block of Metropolis. A miniature radar consisting of six markers representing city blocks is displayed at the top of the playfield, with the largest marker showing the proximity the player is to the potential targets of Luthor or one of his henchmen. Each of these areas is connected on four adjoining sides, which can be traversed by flying up, down, left and right through the screens. The player can traverse through different subway entrances for quicker travel. After entering, the player can traverse different exits by moving upward off screen through different colored areas and then exiting by moving off screen left, right or down.

The player can enable Superman's X-ray vision to see any of the four adjoining frames. While viewing these, Superman cannot move but can still be hit by kryptonite satellites.

== Development ==
In 1976, Warner Communications acquired Atari for $28 million. Warner Communications also owned DC Comics, which owned the rights to the Superman character. The market for comics was shrinking during this period and for the first time, licensing the characters became more profitable, specifically in comparison to the film rentals for the 1978 film Superman. Warner Communications wanted Atari to follow their financially successful film up with a prompt video game tie-in. According to Jessica Aldred in the book Before the Crash, Superman was the first film-licensed game for the Atari VCS, while Ian Bogost and Nick Montfort in their book Racing the Beam (2009) stated that it was not clear that the game was based on the film. Carl Wilson wrote in The Superhero Multiverse that Mario Puzo's contract had mandated that his story for the Superman film was not to be adapted into any other form as well as finding that the brief plot summary of the game did not relate to any specific Superman comic story running at that period.

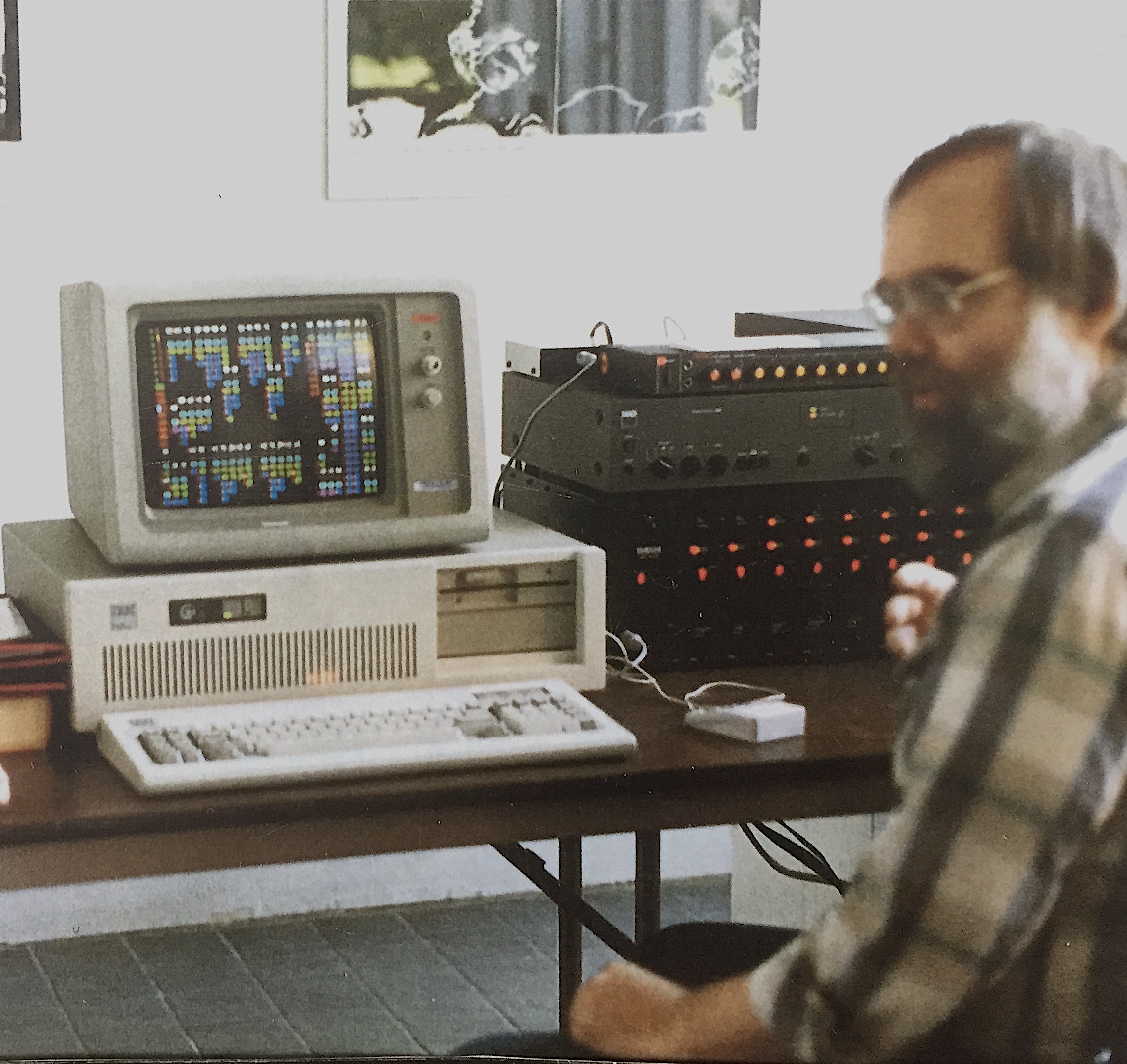
John Dunn (pictured in 1986) was the programmer of Superman.

While developing the game Adventure (1980) in 1978, Warren Robinett was asked to shelve the game and use its design to create a game based on Superman. At the time, Robinett had a prototype of the game where the player could move a small square "cursor" from screen to screen picking up colored shapes. Robinett had passed the job on to John Dunn, who shared code to facilitate the game's development. According to the game's cover designer Judy Richter, DC Comics was not very hands-on in the development of the game, and did not give their input or opinions on the game's development; however, DC did give them a playbook on exactly how Superman should look, as the cover art would be crucial as that is what people would see on the store shelves.

The game was programmed by Dunn in 1978. Dunn took on the job with the condition that he could develop a game that had a four kilobyte ROM chip on its cartridge. With the exception of Casino (1978) and Hangman (1978), every game made for the Atari VCS had been written within two kilobytes.

For sound and graphics, the Atari 2600 had its Television Interface Adaptor (TIA), which authors Montfort and Bogost described as a programming challenge, allowing for only a relatively small number of unique features. The Atari 2600 did not allow for such services such as graphic rendering, forcing programmers to draw the entirety of each frame of the game's display. The game features no music and only simple sound effects, such as audio getting louder and quieter as Superman flies higher and lower into the air. It was one of the first video games with multicolored sprites and was among the first console games with a pause feature, following the Fairchild Channel F system.

== Release ==
In Atari's The Atari Video Computer System Catalog from 1979, the game was listed as being available soon. Betsy Staples wrote in September 1979 in Creative Computing about playing the game at an Electronic expo, while promotional material in newspapers stated the game as arriving soon on September 13, and then being available in stock on September 28. A review in The Space Gamer also stated the game was released in the third quarter of 1979.

== Reception ==
Reception

Review scores
Publication	Score
Allgame	5/5
The Complete Guide to Electronic Games	1/5
Electronic Games 1983 Software Encyclopedia	9/10

Bill Kunkel and Arnie Katz reviewed Superman in Video, and they declared that it "ushers in an exciting new era for home arcades [...] put simply, there's no game remotely similar to this one", citing that its place in a Video Arcade Hall of Fame "seems assured". Video established its Arcade Awards, nicknamed the Arkies, to recognize "outstanding achievements in the field of electronic gaming" and had their 1981 edition acknowledge the year's games. Superman was listed as their "Game of the Year", with the publication declaring it a single-player masterpiece and "the most important release" of the year. Norman Howe commented in The Space Gamer that he found moving the character to the edge of the screen to progress to a new area "unusual". Howe proclaimed that the multiple tasks and quick travel systems made it "a fascinating challenge" with "excellent graphics" and declared it "the best Atari game I have yet seen". Among the weak points, Howe noted that it was possible to lose items near the edge of the frame and that the game had a high cost for a single scenario. Another review from Electronic Games in its "1983 Software Encyclopedia" issue gave it a nine out of ten rating, declaring the gameplay, graphics and sound as "excellent" and stating it was "outstanding" as a single-player game. The editors and writers of the magazine Video and Computer Gaming Illustrated listed Superman as second place for the Best Game not based on an arcade game in March 1984. The publication wrote that "despite what were roundly acknowledged as "wanting" graphics. Several votes remarked that the game has "charm"", specifically noting the many cityscapes in the game and the multiple ways to traverse the map. In his book The Complete Guide to Electronic Games (1981), Howard J. Blumenthal said the game was far too complicated and convoluted to be enjoyable, concluding it was "not one of Atari's more persevering games."

Retrospectively, Bogost and Monfort found that Superman "expunged the movie's social and emotional relationships - and those of the comic books - choosing action sequences instead. Games licensed from movies have continued to follow this early VCS game in this regard". William Wilson of Forbes stated in 2015 that Superman was exceptional by contemporary technical standards, noting its graphics being better than some of the competition, specifically comparing it to Atari's Adventure. Skyler Miller of Allgame praed the game's re-playability, graphics, but found it not up to the standards of the games developed for the system by Activision. He also appreciated the smaller details such as the sound of flying decreasing in volume as Superman ascends and Lois Lane lifting her leg when Superman kisses her. In 2009, Michal Mozejko of Retro Gamer opined that the game was still the best Superman video game, praising its innovation with being the first to utilize multiple screens as a playing area, although he noted that travelling through the map was not intuitive. Michael Herde of the German video game magazine MAN!AC included it along with E.T. the Extra-Terrestrial (1982) and The Texas Chainsaw Massacre (1983) as one of the worst games for the Atari 2600. He described Superman as having flickering graphics and poor color composition and compared navigating Superman through Metropolis in the game to "malicious orientation paradoxes".

Superman was the first published superhero to feature in a video game, followed up on the Atari 2600 by Spider-Man (1982). Following the video game crash of 1983, Warner Communications was without any video game subsidiary as they had divided and sold Atari. Once the video game market began to recover, Warner Communications began licensing out their DC Comics properties to third-party developers. The next game featuring Superman appeared in 1985: Superman: The Game by First Star Software for the Commodore 64.

== See also ==
- 1979 in video games
- List of Atari 2600 games
