= Concha Jerez =

Spanish artist

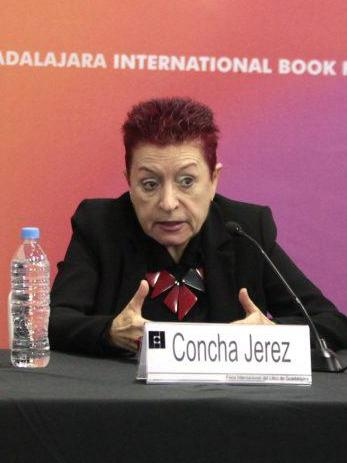
- Born: 1941 (age 84–85); Las Palmas, Spain
- Education: Complutense University of Madrid
- Occupation: Artist
- Years active: 1970–present
- Employer: University of Salamanca (1991–2011)
- Known for: Conceptual art
- Awards: Gold Medal of Merit in the Fine Arts (2011); National Award for Plastic Arts (2015)
- Website: conchajerez.net

Concha Jerez (Las Palmas de Gran Canaria, 1941) is a Spanish multidisciplinary artist known as a pioneer in conceptual art. One of the central axes of her work is the critical analysis of the media.

== Artistic career ==
Concha Jerez studied piano at the Madrid Royal Conservatory, and in 1958–1959 she obtained a scholarship to Washington-Lee High School in Arlington, Virginia, where she became interested in political and social affairs. This led her to study for her licentiate in political science at the Complutense University of Madrid.

In 1970 she decided to dedicate herself to visual arts, and held her first exhibition in 1973.

As she began her career under the threat of censorship by the Franco regime, the role of the media, censorship, and self-censorship have often been present in her artistic work. In 1976 she presented her first large installation, Autocensura, still restricted to printed paper. In 1983 she exhibited the installation Retorno al comienzo at the Museo Vostell Malpartida. Later she opened the doors to the use of all kinds of new technological possibilities, such as video, interactive installations, photographs, and pure audio installations.

The issue of self-censorship when I began in 1970, during the Franco era, did not disappear when the mechanisms of democracy were unleashed because I saw that it was maintained not only at the public or sociological level, but also at the private level. Public self-censorship unfortunately over the years has been "in crescendo", adding to itself, among others, labor. I continue to use these writings to put before the eyes of the viewer that there is self-censorship.

— Concha Jerez, Revista Mito, 2015

Since then Jerez has focused her work on the field of performance art and on the development of the concept of installation as a work in situ, in large spaces, many of them combining the expressive resources of different media. She has been recognized as a member of Spain's first generation of conceptual artists.

She began videocreación in the early 1980s. Her first video installation was centered around a staircase. It was presented at the First International Video Festival of Madrid held at the Círculo de Bellas Artes in 1984. Later in the decade she was invited to perform an installation at the First Media Art Festival in Osnabrück, Germany.

Jerez has produced radio art pieces for several European stations.

Since 1976 she has collaborated on numerous projects with the composer and multidisciplinary artist José Iges, with whom she presented Media Mutaciones at La Tabacalera in Madrid in 2015. This was a tour of their joint projects, covering work connected with the legacy of the 1970s and their current visual and sound practices.

From July 2014 to January 2015, the Museo de Arte Contemporáneo de Castilla y León exhibited her Interferencias en los medios.

In 2015, Jerez won the National Award for Plastic Arts "for her pioneering dimension in the use of technologies, for being representative of a generation of artists that has marked the transition from the analog era to digital culture, with her research, creations, and innovations" and her work in conceptual creation.

Jerez was also a teacher at the University of Salamanca's Faculty of Fine Arts from 1991 to 2011.

Feminism and a generically left-wing stance are prominent within her work, as well as outside it.

Of course in my attitude I have no choice but to be a feminist when you see the condition of women, with the large number of people killed by gender violence, the inequality of salaries, and the difficulty of accessing positions of political responsibility, public and private. We must fight against this type of situation and educate from below, from the school itself, valuing the good way of making women very capable in economic, political, and social areas.

— Concha Jerez, Revista Mito, 2015

Jerez has been an organizer, co-organizer, and grassroots militant of various associations of women and artists, including the Asociación de Mujeres en las Artes Visuales (MAV), which granted her an award in 2012 as a recognition of her career.

In 2018 she participated in the collective exhibition organized by the CentroCentro, La NO comunidad, with the work Soliloquios cotidianos. This was presented as an essay on loneliness in the modern world.

Also in 2018, on the occasion of the 40th anniversary of the Constitution of Spain, her installation Textos autocensurados.Versión 1,1976 was among works selected from the Museo Nacional Centro de Arte Reina Sofía for the exhibition El poder del arte, which was located for the first time in the houses of the Congress of Deputies and the Senate.

== Awards and recognitions ==
- 2011: Gold Medal of Merit in the Fine Arts
- 2012: Asociación de Mujeres en las Artes Visuales Award
- 2015: National Award for Plastic Arts
- 2017: Velázquez Award for Plastic Arts
- 2018: Gold Medal of the Canary Islands
