= James E. Sheridan =

American historian

James Sheridan
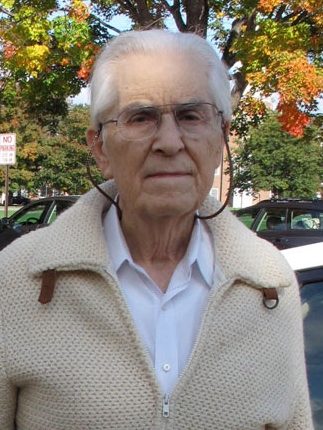
- In 2011, at the Hood Museum in Hanover, in his wife exhibition "The Art of Sonia Sheridan"
- Born: James Edward Sheridan; July 15, 1922; Wilmington, Delaware
- Died: December 21, 2015 (aged 93); Hanover, New Hampshire
- Spouse: Sonia Landy Sheridan
- Awards: Fulbright fellow; Ford Foundation fellow

Academic background
- Education: University of Illinois; University of California, Berkeley
- Thesis: (1961)

Academic work
- Institutions: Stanford University; Northwestern University
- Main interests: Modern Chinese history
- Notable works: China in Disintegration: The Republican Era in Chinese History 1912-1949; Chinese Warlord: The Career of Feng Yü-hsiang

James Edward Sheridan (July 15, 1922 – December 21, 2015) was a professor emeritus in the Department of History at Northwestern University and the author of a number of books on modern Chinese history, such as China in Disintegration: The Republican Era in Chinese History and the biography Chinese Warlord: The Career of Feng Yu-Hsiang.

== Biography ==
Sheridan was born in Wilmington, Delaware. At the outset of World War II, he enlisted in the US Navy. Later he trained others in the use of radar. He served as an ensign in the United States Navy, 1941-1946.

He earned a Bachelor of Science degree from the University of Illinois in 1949, and a Master of Arts from the same institution in 1950. After the war he continued his education on the GI bill, studied Russian, then Chinese on grants in Paris, Taiwan, and Japan. He was a Fulbright fellow in France, 1950-1951; Ford Foundation fellow, 1958-1960; and a grantee of the American Council of Learned Societies - Social Science Research Council, 1966-1967 and 1971-72. He earned a Doctor of Philosophy at the University of California, Berkeley in 1961.

He taught at Stanford University, then accepted the position of teaching Chinese history at Northwestern University where he remained until 1989. At Northwestern he was the History Department chair, director of the Program of African Asian Languages, and associate dean of the College of Arts and Sciences. He wrote three books on modern Chinese history and contributed to other books on the same general subject.

He retired with his wife, the artist and researcher Sonia Landy Sheridan, to the Kendal Community in Hanover, New Hampshire, where he was very active in the cultural life of the center. As a historian he wrote the history and values of Kendal, A Caring Community and Untie the Elderly. He wrote articles for that organization, editing Kendalights for 17 years. He died in Hanover, aged 93.

== Published works ==
- Sheridan, James E. (1975). "China in Disintegration: The Republican Era in Chinese History 1912-1949". History: Reviews of New Books. 4 (4). New York: The Free Press, a division of Macmillan Publishing Co.: 85. doi:10.1080/03612759.1976.9945294.
- Sheridan, James E. (1966). Chinese Warlord: The Career of Feng Yü-hsiang. Stanford University Press. 978-0804701457
- Sheridan, Sonia Landy. Sheridan, James E. (ed.). Art at the Dawning of the Electronic Era: Generative Systems. University Press of New England.
