= Marian Lopez Fernandez-Cao =

Spanish university professor, curator and researcher

Marian López Fernández-Cao
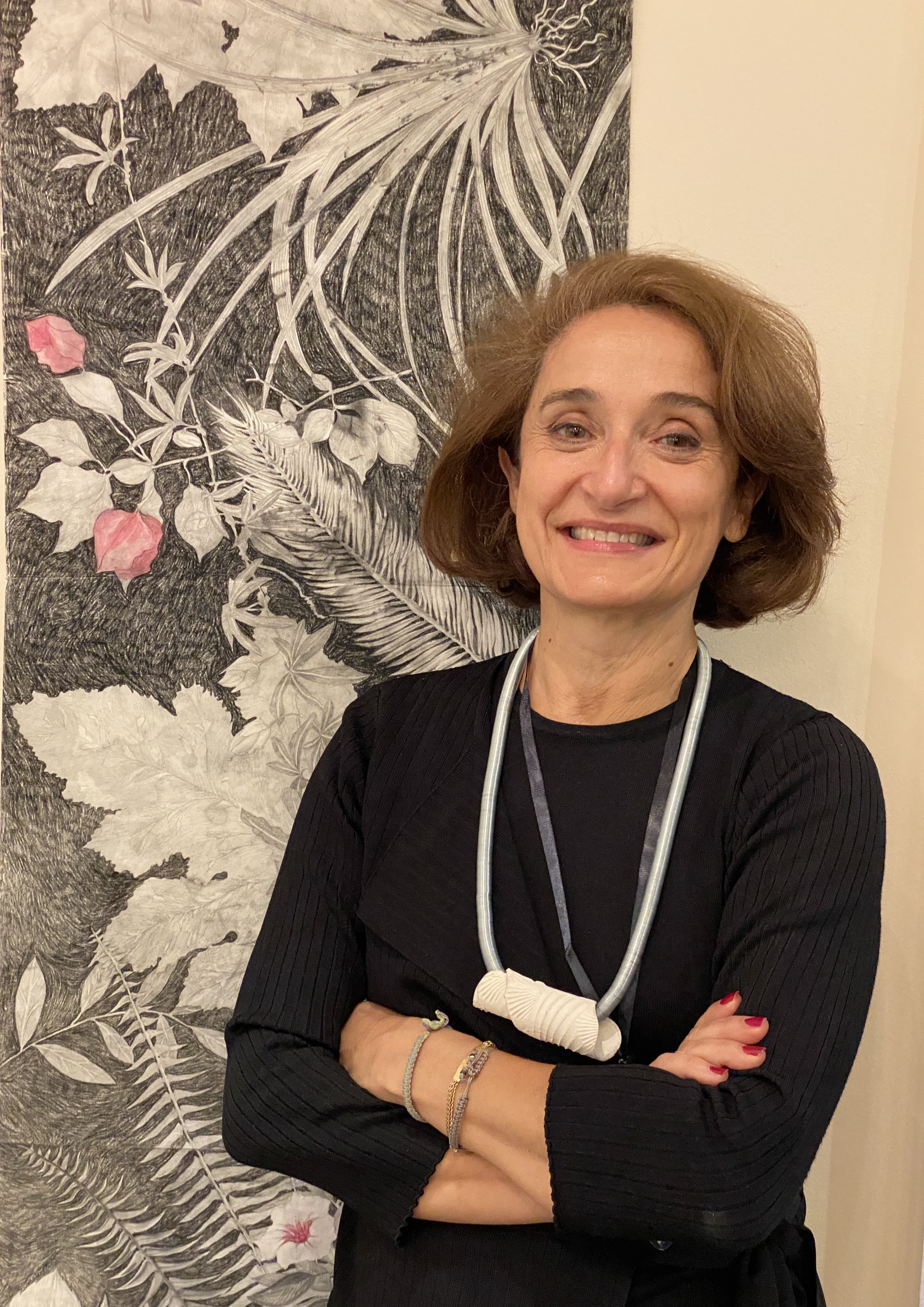
- with her art work at the Librarte Art fair 2021
- Born: 1964 (age 61–62); Vigo, Spain
- Other names: Marián Cao, Marian Lopez Fdz Cao, Marian Lopez Fernandez-Cao
- Occupations: Art historian, Researcher, Curator, Professor
- Known for: Art Therapy

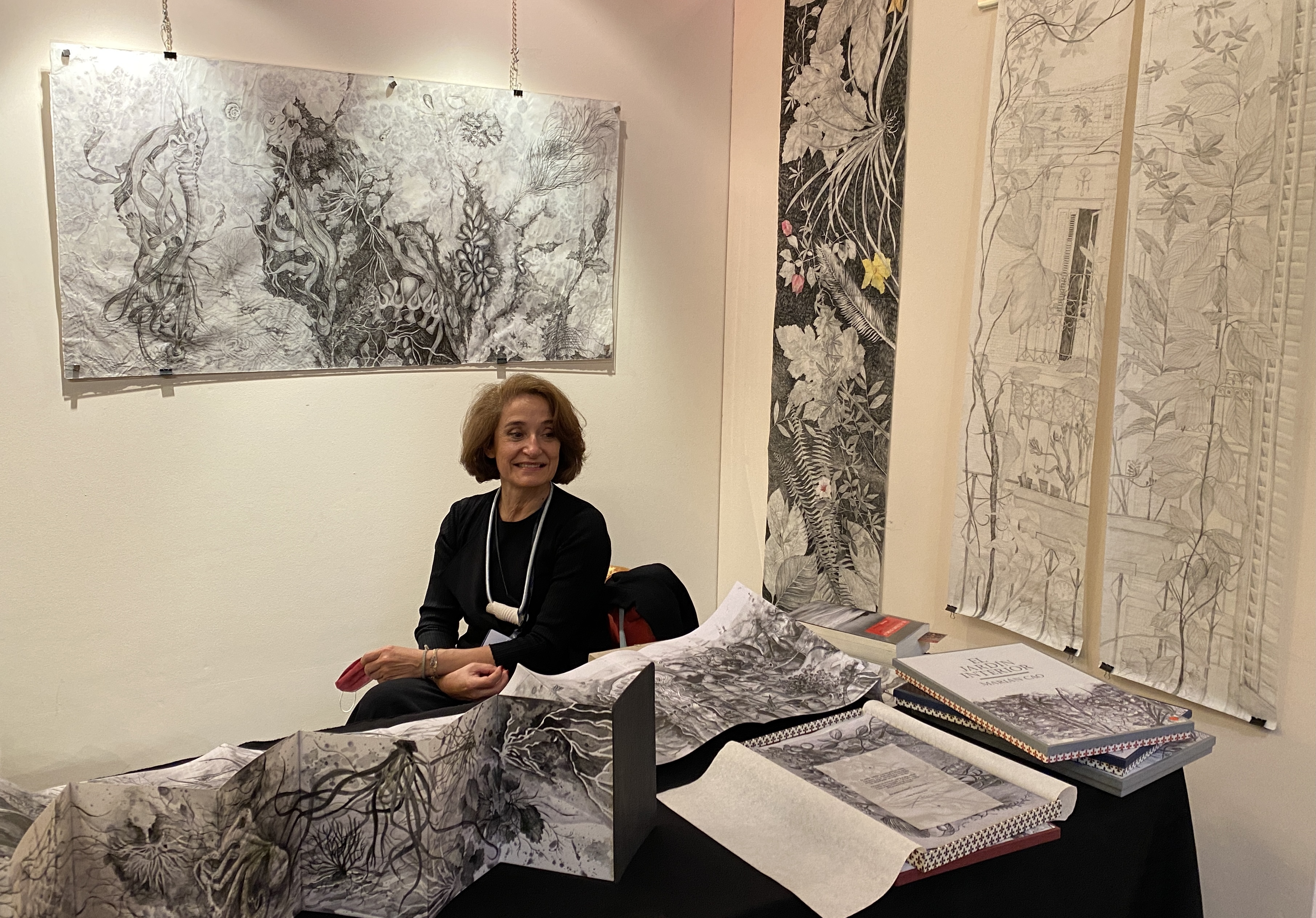
at the Librarte Art Fair in 2021

Marian Lopez Fernandez-Cao (born 1964, Vigo, Pontevedra) is a Spanish university professor, curator and researcher, specializing in art, feminism, art therapy and social inclusion. Since 1992 she has been a professor in the Universidad Complutense of Madrid, and is expert on the artist Sonia Delaunay.

== Biography ==
Fernandez-Cao has a Ph.D. in Fine Arts at the Complutense University of Madrid in 1991, M.F.A. in Psychotherapeutic Intervention (Intervención Psicoterapeutica) in 2009, B.F.A. in Fine Arts at the Complutense University of Madrid in 1987.

Member of the community of the editorial En Pie de Paz´s magazine since 1988 until its dissolution in 2001. She has been director of the Spanish Institute of Feminist Investigations between 2007 until 2011 and she has been promoter and director of the Master in Art Therapy and Artistic Education for social inclusion from 2010 until 2014 of the Universidad Complutense of Madrid.

She was President of the Asociación de Mujeres en las Artes Visuales (MAV) from 2012 until 2017, the goal of this organization is to improve the position of the woman in the Contemporary Art in Spain. She is the director of the investigation group, Research Group EARTDI, this group is a reference in the field of art and the psycho-social inclusion. She is the main researcher of Divercity, a European Community project created by the Complutense University of Madrid in collaboration with other institutions such as the Museum Thyssen, Intermediae, and other museums.

Marian Cao is promoter of the project on Gender and Museums since 2009 from the conjoint work of the team of the Institute of Feminist Investigations of the Complutense University of Madrid, with the Spanish Ministry of Culture, and the association eMujeres, which it results in the web Museos en Femenino, to form the personnel of museums and be used in the education by itineraries that analyze the art from perspective of gender (Didactic 2.0 Museums in feminine), at Museo del Prado, Museo Nacional Centro de Arte Reina Sofía, Museo Arqueológico Nacional y Museo del Traje. It is a tool to teach through itineraries that analyze art from a gender perspective.

She has developed projects on art and feminism, art therapy and art and social intervention. Besides, she has coordinated and she made workshops with migrants and people in risk of social exclusion. She has shared the coordination of workshops of inclusion with the researcher Noemí Martínez Díez and several workshops on feminism with the artist Marisa González programmed by MAV (Women in the Visual arts).

== Publications ==
She has published works related with art, inclusion, therapy and feminism. She is director of the collection 21 guías para Educación Primaria "Posibilidades de ser a través del arte", of the Editorial Eneida, that received in 2010, the Prize Rosa Regàs to educational material with co educative value.

Also, she is director of the magazine Arteterapia, Papeles de Arteterapia y educación Artística para la Inclusión Social (Service of Publications of the Universidad Complutense of Madrid) that spreads the possibilities of the art like road of psychosocial welfare.

Dialnet offer a list of her publications.

=== Other publications ===
==== Works ====
- Para qué el arte: reflexiones en torno al arte y su educación en tiempos de crisis. Marián López Fernández Cao. (Madrid) Fundamentos, 2015. ISBN 978-84-245-1288-0.
- Mulier me fecit: hacia un análisis feminista del arte y su educación. Marián López Fernández Cao. (Madrid) Horas y Horas, D.L. 2011. ISBN 978-84-96004-42-9.
- Memoria, ausencia e identidad: el arte como terapia. Marián López Fernández Cao. (Madrid) Eneida, 2011. ISBN 978-84-92491-82-7.
- Käthe Kollwitz: (1867–1945) Marián López Fernández Cao. Ediciones del Orto,1997. ISBN 84-7923-175-0.
- Arteterapia. Marián López Fdz. Cao, Martínez Díez, N. Editions tutor, 2006 ISBN 9788479025557.

==== Collaborations in collective works ====
- Arte, intervención y acción social: la creatividad transformadora. Coord. por Ana Carnacea Cruz, Ana Lozano Cámbara, 2013, ISBN 978-84-937730-2-1.
  1. De la función estética y pedagógica a la función social y terapeútica (arteterapia). Págs. 69–95. Marián López Fdz. Cao.
  2. Cómo hacer una sopa con piedras: el arte como herramienta de intervención y mediación social. Construyendo sociedades más creativas. Págs. 97–127. Marián López Fdz. Cao.
- Sociología y género. Coord. por Capitolina Díaz Martínez, Sandra Dema Moreno, 2013. ISBN 978-84-309-5810-8.
  1. El mundo del arte, la industria cultural y la publicidad desde la perspectiva de género. Págs.271-300. Marián López Fdz. Cao.
- Infancia, mercado y educación artística. Coord. por Ricardo Marín Viadel, 2011, ISBN 978-84-9700-658-3.
  1. Niños de cine: Apuntes sobre las películas dirigidas a la infancia tardía. Págs. 89–108. Marián López Fdz. Cao.
- Género y paz. Coord. por María Elena Díez Jorge, Margarita Sánchez Romero, 2010, ISBN 978-84-9888-264-3.
  1. De la creación de las mujeres. Apuntes sobre paz, feminismo y creación. Págs.151-158. Marián López Fdz. Cao.
