= Generative Systems: Art, Science and Technology =

American program founded in 1970

Generative Systems
- Years active: 1970–1980
- Location: United States
- Major figures: Sonia Sheridan
- Influences: John F Dunn, Marisa Gonzalez
- Influenced: Moholy Nagy

Generative Systems was a program founded by Sonia Landy Sheridan at the School of the Art Institute of Chicago in 1969 to help integrate art with new technologies.

== History ==
Sheridan was teaching art at the School of the Art Institute of Chicago the 1960s, still using pen, pencil and brush. In the late 1960s silk screen printing was added, along with a new Cameron enlarging technology, followed by a 3M Thermo-Fax copier. Don Conlin, manager of the 3M Color Research Lab, introduced Sheridan to Dr. Douglas Dybvig, chemist and primary inventor of Color-in-Color, the world's first color copier. Sheridan was invited by 3M to spend the summer of 1970 in the 3M Color Research Lab to work along with Dr. Dybvig and the developers of Color-in-Color machine. After a demonstration in the school, Conlin and Dybvig arranged for a Color-in-Color copier to be installed in Sheridan's Generative Systems class. In the interim, Sheridan and her students acquired a couple of transmission (fax) machines, a Haloid Xerox, and other assorted older business machines, plus experimental cameras.

In the 1970s, electronic technology replaced hand tools and real time imaging emerged in a symbiosis between Art, Science and Technology. The use of industrial photocopiers and computers as creative tools, was a contribution to interdisciplinary approach to the fine arts, exploring the creative possibilities of image-generating equipment. The use of communications instruments generated innovative research.

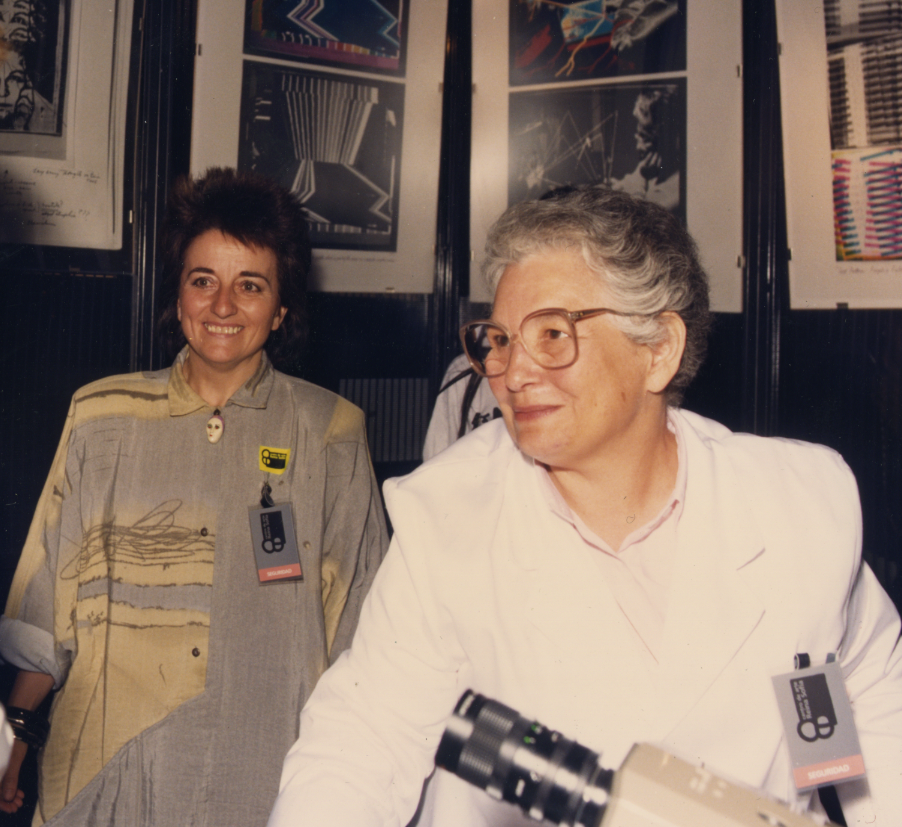
Sonia Sheridan and Marisa Gonzalez at the exhibition Procesos in the opening of the Centro de Arte Reina Sofia in Madrid 1986

Sheridan initiated Generative Systems program introducing students to various reprography techniques like the first graphic arts experiments, xerography (electronic imaging), the Thermo-Fax copier, the Telecopier, the Haloid (Xerox) camera, using these machines in conjunction with other devices: gatling camera, video monitor, frequency generator, biofeedback system.

The singular methods of instruction used by Sheridan in her Generative Systems courses created a new way of teaching art and technology integration within a practical context under the basics of creative thinking and experimentation.

The students that attended the program had different backgrounds such as photographers, filmmakers, painters, Music composers, writers, inventors (Greg Gundlach received 5 patents for 3D photography, that he worked on in Generative Systems). At least 4 countries were represented among the students, Elizabeth de Ribes from Paris, France, Marisa Gonzalez from Madrid, Spain, Michael Rouviere Day from Montreal, Canada, Malú Ortega Guerrero ("Malú") from Mexico City, Mexico, Malú was working with Sonia Sheridan Martha Loving and Michael Day at the Chicago Museum of Science and Industry.

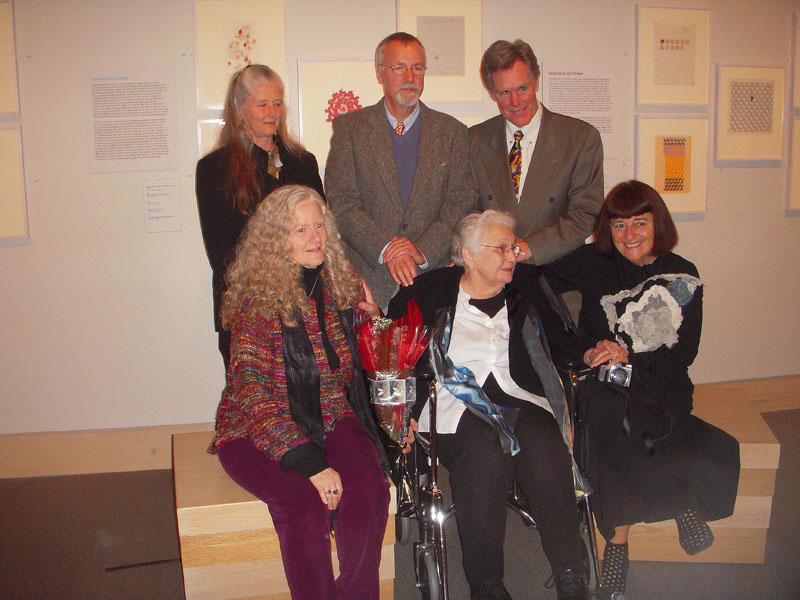
Sonia Sheridan, at her exhibition at the Hood Museum in USA in 2011, with some of her students from Generative Systems in the 70´s. Greg Gundlach, Brian Oglesbee, Martha Loving, Sonia Sheridan and Marisa González.

Experienced students enrolled in the Generative Systems program: John Dunn, a former student at SAIC, invented EASEL software for a Cromemco Z2D DOS computer. This was later followed by Lumena software in a Time Arts PC computer, produced by John Dunn's California company, Time Arts, Inc, Ink jet printers were usually used. With this system she introduced the students to computers and digital image processing tools, to the basics of infography and computer animation. John Dunn also created, the software Vango for the PC. VanGo would evolve into Wonk. Jamy Sheridan worked with John Dunn on the visual part of this newer Wonk sound/image system.

Sheridan shared her philosophical heritage about art, science and technology in society with her students: John Dunn, Greg Gundlach, Martha Loving Orgain, Mitch Petchenick, Craig Goldwyn, John Mabey, Phil Malkin, Marilyn Goldstein, Barbara MacKowiak, Michael Day, Jessie Affelder, Bill McCabe, Gerda Bernstein, Elizabeth De Ribes, Pete Lekousis, Brian Oglesbee, Suzanne L. Seed, Marisa González, Mary Jane Dougherty, Holly Pedlosky, Ric Puls and Ed Kislaitis (later Covannon).

Through the GS department, inventors, researchers, scientists, artists interacted and experimented with the students. She collaborated with Leif Brush, Willard Van De Bogart, Aldo Tambellini, as well as with the great multimedia pioneer artist Stan Vanderbeek with whom she participated in workshops and TV videos.

For the first time in Europe, Sheridan had her solo show and workshop with the Lumena System at the Musee d'Art Moderne de La Ville de Paris, in the exhibition "Electra" in Paris in 1983 and 1984.

In 1986, she brought the same System to the National Museum Art Center Reina Sofia in Madrid at the exhibition "Processos Cultura y Nuevas Tecnologías". This was the first exhibition celebrated at the National Museum Art Center Reina Sofia. In October 1986, took place the "Making Waves. Interactive Art/Science Exhibition", in Evanston, Illinois. "Making Waves" provides a historical perspective about art and technology. Seven artists and scientists whose pioneering work has had a major impact on the direction and development of the new art. Sonia Sheridan had a major exhibition workshop presenting the Computer Lumena System.

Generative Systems conference and DVD publications at the University of Liverpool, United Kingdom, the Beatle's old school in the year 1999.

Sheridan in October 2009 reunited with some Generative Systems students at "The Art of Sonia Landy Sheridan" exhibition at the Hood Museum of Art in Dartmouth College, Hanover (New Hampshire).

In 2013, at the "Festival of Art and Visual Culture" in Berlin, Transmediale, the curator of the exhibition of the festival, Jacob Lillemose, selected Sonia Sheridan with her solo show "Exhibition Imaging with Machine Processes". The Generative Art of Sonia Landy Sheridan as a researcher and pioneer in new media not only in North America but throughout the world, as well as for her teaching at SAIC, the School of the Art Institute of Chicago.

Since April 2005, at the Daniel Langlois Foundation for Art, Science, and Technology in Montreal, Canada has the Sonia Landy Sheridan fonds, documentation, archives, texts, digital files and artwork, master videotapes of the program by John Mabey, sound tapes, early computer original Sheridan discs. In 2006, Kathryn Farley was awarded a Grant for Researcher in Residence by the Daniel Langlois Foundation to chart the history of the Generative Systems, a groundbreaking instructional program founded in 1970 by Professor Sonia Landy Sheridan at the School of the Art Institute of Chicago, and trace its seminal impact on the development of technological arts education. Farley worked in close contact with Web designer, Ludovic Carpentier, and archivist Vincent Bonin, to conceive of an interface that illuminates the complex matrix of ideas, processes and practices that Generative Systems gave rise to, drew inspiration from and transformed during its lifespan. Information is arranged within the matrix in a way that emphasizes the interconnected components of the program, helping to demonstrate its collaborative, experimental and process-oriented features in real-time.

These records can, for the most part, be found in the series Books, exhibition catalogues, periodicals and manuscripts and Generative Systems classroom records at the Daniel Langlois Foundation. Finally, the fonds includes correspondence and general documents relating to Sheridan's personal life, including boxes of her father's correspondence with her relating to Generative Systems developments. The fonds consist of seven series: Research and teaching activities (1960–2002, particularly 1960–1990); Publishing and editing activities; Events: exhibitions and conferences (1954–2004, particularly 1963–1992); Books, exhibition catalogues, periodicals and manuscripts (1964–2004, particularly 1964–1994); Background files (1968–2004, particularly 1968–1993); Artworks and printouts (1969–2002); General correspondence (1973–1994).

== Publications ==
- Artist in the Science Lab (3M Corporation, St. Paul, 1976).
- Energized Art/Science (Chicago Museum of Science and Industry and 3M Corporation, St. Paul, 1978).
- Musèe d'Art Modern de la Ville de Paris. Electra.
- Museo Centro de Arte Reina Sofía. Procesos: Cultura y Nuevas Tecnologías.
- Alcalá, José R., Canales, Fernando Ñ.: Copy Art. La fotocopia como soporte expresivo.
- LEONARDO. Journal of the international society for the arts, sciences ad technology, Volume 23.
- Urbons, Klaus. Copy Art.
- Urbons, Klaus. Elektrografie. Analoge und digitale Bilder.
- Evolution 2.0. Generative Systems & Generative Art. (ISEA, Liverpool, 1998)
- González, Marisa. Registros Hiperfotográficos e Instalaciones.
- Landy Sheridan, Sonia. Art at the dawning of the electronic era: generative systems.

== See also ==
- computer art
- generative art
