= Mari Chordà =

Spanish painter and poet

- Born: 14 May 1942 (age 84); Amposta, Catalonia, Spain
- Known for: Painter, Poet, Social activist

Mari Chordà Recasens (born 1942 in Amposta, Catalonia) is an artist, painter, poet and a Catalan feminist socio-cultural activist. Her work has been exhibited in The World Goes Pop, at Tate Modern.

== Early life ==
Born 14 May 1942 to Conxa Recasens Solé and Ramon Chordà Prades in Amposta (southern Catalonia), Mari Chordà Recasens (known simply as Mari Chordà for her artistic work) was the youngest of three siblings. Her parents owned a well-known and busy shop in Amposta (Cal Rifaire or Casa Chordà, 1921-1996) which Mari would also help to run later in life. Her curiosity for art was awakened by her parents’ interest in culture and, predominantly, by a local artist Marisol Panisello who used to visit Mari when she was bedridden in the early 1950s recovering from health issues. She won several prizes for her early paintings in local exhibitions and competitions during the 1950s and after finishing school she went to Barcelona to study Fine Arts and develop her possibilities as an artist.

== Career, works and major exhibitions ==
In 1964 she painted the work Vagina, a work of art which was later recognised as groundbreaking and a theme she would come back to often with variations during the two years she spent in Paris (1965-66) culminating with The Great Vagina (1966). Pregnant with her daughter Angela, in 1966 she started the series of four self-portraits “Self-portrait: pregnancy month 3; month 5; month 7; and month 9” which she finished in 1967 back in Amposta for Angela’s birth (February, 1967).

Always culturally active and socially aware, Mari Chordà set up and ran Lo Llar in Amposta between 1968-1971 (it is still open under different owners). A café-bar and cultural centre for people to meet and exchange ideas and opinions, art exhibitions, poetry readings, and musical performances. Spending time in Amposta and Barcelona, she continued her work and artistic development with paintings, sketches and sculptures, receiving different grants and prizes. She was a pioneer in the visual expression of female sexuality, feminist thought and the experience of motherhood. She also worked on different audio-visual projects. In 1974 she lost interest in painting temporarily and wouldn’t paint again until 1991.

As part of her feminist activism, she produced an anonymous folder of poetry and lithographs entitled “… i moltes altres coses” (… and many other things) which was handed round at the 'First Catalan Women's Debates' at the University of Barcelona in 1976 before being published later the same year under her name. She next published the collection of reflections and poems Quadern del cos i de l'aigua (Notes of the body and water) in 1978, with drawings by Montse Clavé. This was one of the first publications in Catalonia to openly describe the discovery and experience of lesbian sexuality.

She co-founded, alongside Carme Casas, Sat Sabater, Montse Solà, and María José Quevedo the laSal venue, a bar and feminist library, in Barcelona which was open from 1977 to 1979. It provided a safe space for women to meet up and enjoy cultural exchanges, poetry readings, debates and musical performances. Mari Chordà was also a co-founder of the publishing house laSal edicions de les dones (1978-1990) alongside, originally, Mariló Fernandez, Isabel Martínez, and Isabel Monteagudo. This female-run cultural project went on to incorporate Mireia Bofill, María José Quevedo, Maria Bauçà, Carme Casas, Montserrat Abelló, Mercè Fernàndez, Goya Vivas, Isabel Segura and others. One of their eagerly-awaited publications was the annual Women’s Agenda which they brought out from 1978 to 1990. Mari revived the concept and published the agenda again with Conxa Llinàs from 1996 to 2009. With laSal edicions they published over seventy works including novels, poetry, essays, and translations – most of which had a clear feminist and/or social message or were examples of reclaiming women’s writing which had been unfairly left aside.

She actively participated in the struggle to reclaim the space and legacy of what is now known as the Francesca Bonnemaison Women's Culture Centre. Chordà’s poem Petenera de Mar was chosen by the singer-songwriter Marina Rossell for her album Bruixes i Maduixes in 1980.

During the 1980s, she continued her work at laSal edicions as well as publishing various articles on art and feminist issues. She enjoyed trips to Mexico and New York which helped her continue developing as an artist, before moving back to Barcelona in 1991 and gradually finding the inspiration and need to start painting once more.

In 2000, Mari Chordà published Umbilicals, a book of poetry around themes of pregnancy and motherhood and the relationships between a mother and her son or daughter over time. In the same year, she published her fourth poetry collection, Locomotora Infidel del Passat which chiefly reflects on the relationships, love and desire between women.

In 2000 a significant exhibition of her artistic and literary work in the 20th century was presented in Amposta, and later Tortosa and Tarragona: Mari Chordà. Passar i traspassar 1960-2000, curated by Marisa Díez de la Fuente. The Francesca Bonnemaison Women’s Cultural Centre in Barcelona organized another major exhibition in 2007, curated by Marta Darder, which also included examples of Mari’s underwater photography.

During this decade she continued writing, painting, and participating in collective books, recitals and debates and also collaborating with the Ca la Dona women’s centre in Barcelona. In 2010, Chordà, Vicens Mascarell and Marta Darder presented the ImaRges exhibition in Amposta based around underwater photos and videos taken to explore the symbiosis between the female body and water. She also referred in this work to the spirochetes bacteria, Spirosymplokos deltaiberi, which the biologist Lynn Margulis, known for her studies into the origins of life, evolution and symbiogenesis, had discovered in the Ebro Delta.

Between 2012-2013 Mari’s work was included in the exhibition “Feminist genealogy in Spanish art: 1960-2010” shown in the Museum of Contemporary Art (MUSAC) in Castile and León in northern Spain and later in the Reina Sofia Museum (MNCARS) in Madrid.

A major landmark in her career was the inclusion of her work Coitus Pop (1968) in the exhibition The World Goes Pop held at the Tate Modern in London in 2015. This led to ten of her paintings being included in the MNCARS collection of art.

Her “Llots i torbes” (Silt and peat) exhibition in the Lo Pati art centre in Amposta in 2017 was another key moment in her recent history. This work focussed on fertility, sexuality and the waters of the river Ebro and its Delta through her admiration for the life and work of Lynn Margulis. Mari Chordà’s work was included in the major exhibition Feminismes! at the Contemporary Culture Centre in Barcelona (CCCB) in 2019-2020.

In 2021, Mari represented the Galeria Mayoral art gallery in the Contemporary Art Fair (ARCO) in Madrid. Her work with laSal edicions de dones and her poetry collections were included in the “¡the "Underground and counter-cultural movements of 1970s Catalonia” exhibition at the Palau Robert venue in Barcelona in 2021. Thanks to the suggestion of a high school student, the Amposta council decided to recognize Mari Chordà’s work and importance for the town by naming a square after her in 2021.

In 2022, Mari published her fifth collection of poetry, No com un so (Godall edicions). In 2022, the National Art Museum of Catalonia presented Maternasis, an exhibition of female creators who have worked on themes from which women have been dispossessed, such as pregnancy. In addition to the works of Mari Chordà, the exhibition also featured works by Núria Pompeia, Roser Bru, and Parvine Curie. That same year, Chordà received the award for established artist at the GAC Awards, granted by the Guild of Art Galleries of Catalonia for her exhibition ‘Una artista feminista pionera’ at the Mayoral art gallery.

The following year, in 2023, the National Art Museum of Catalonia included her work in the temporary exhibition titled What Humanity? The Human Figure After the War (1940-1966).

A major exhibition of Mari Chordà’s work from her early pictures to her most recent audio-visual creations, incorporating examples of her paintings, sculptures, poems, essays, and the books published by laSal edicions was held at the Contemporary Art Museum, first in Tarragona, and then in Barcelona in 2024.

== Recognitions ==
Among many prizes and awards Mari Chordà has received, some of the most significant ones include:

- GAC Award for Consolidated Artist given by the Association of Art Galleries of Catalonia in 2022

- Creu de Sant Jordi (Saint Jordi’s Cross) in 2022, one of the highest civil distinctions awarded by the Catalan government

- Premi Nacional de Cultura Catalana (National Award for Catalan Culture) 2025
