= Sonia Sheridan =

American artist and researcher (1925–2021)

Sonia Landy Sheridan
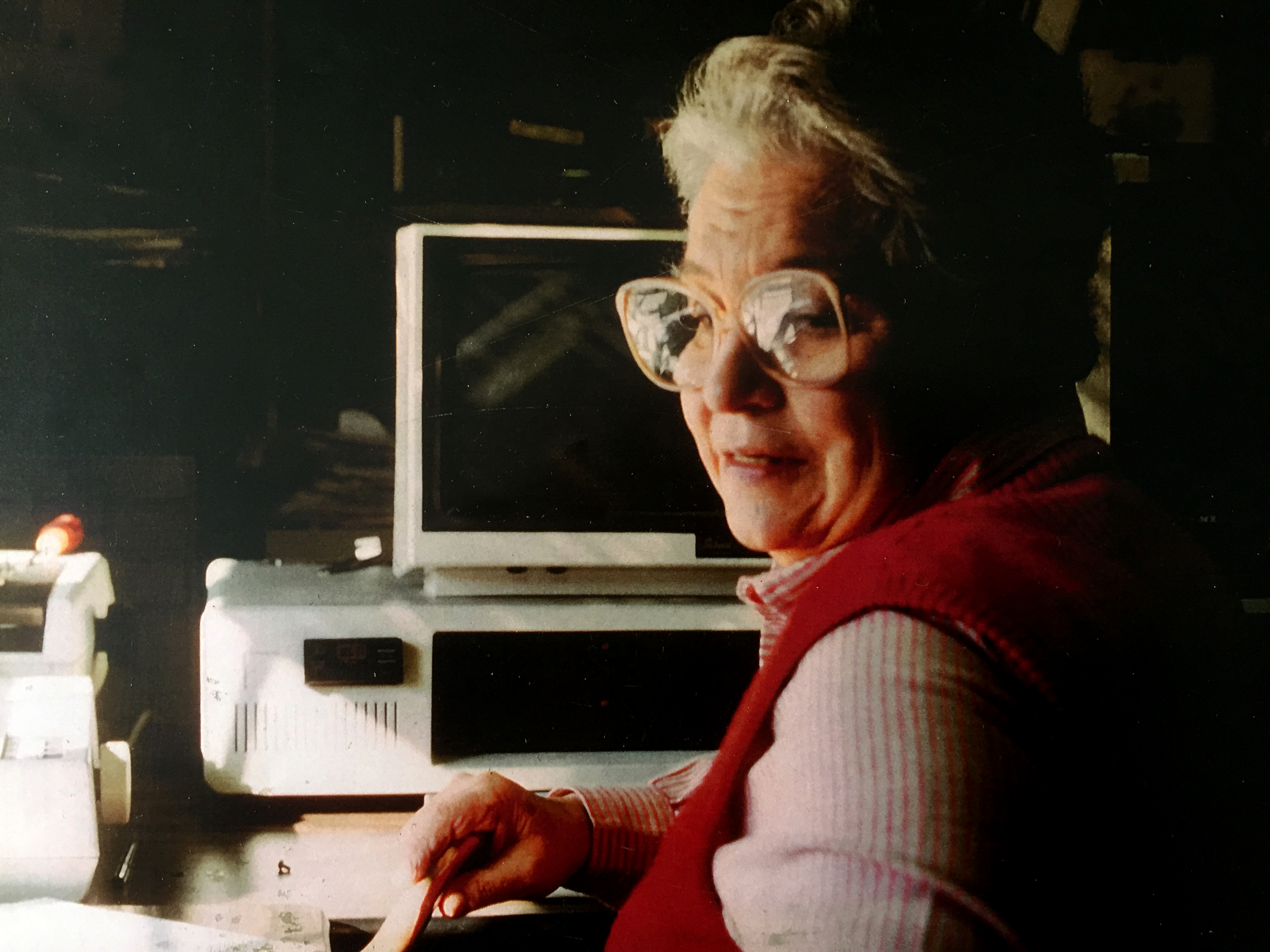
- Sheridan at the exhibition Making Waves Art and Science, Chicago 1986
- Born: April 10, 1925; Newark, Ohio, U.S.
- Died: October 30, 2021 (aged 96); Hanover, New Hampshire, U.S.
- Education: Hunter College BA 1945; Columbia University; California College of Arts and Crafts MFA 1960
- Known for: Generative Systems, Art and Technology
- Spouse: James Edward Sheridan (d 2015)
- Awards: Guggenheim Foundation in 1973 for Photography and the National Endowment for the Arts (1974–1975, 1976–1977, 1981–1982).
- Website: www.artic.edu/aic/collections/artwork/59339?search_no=1&index=3

Sonia Landy Sheridan (April 10, 1925 – October 30, 2021), known as Sonia Sheridan, was an American artist, academic and researcher, who in 1969 founded the Generative Systems research program at the School of the Art Institute of Chicago. She was honorary editor of Leonardo, the Journal of the International Society for the Arts Sciences and Technology (Leonardo/ISAST). Sheridan had received awards from numerous institutions, including the Guggenheim Foundation in 1973 for Photography and the National Endowment for the Arts (1974–1975, 1976–1977, 1981–1982).

== Biography ==
She majored in French and the visual arts at Hunter College in New York City between 1941 and 1945. Between 1946 and 1947, she attended at Columbia University in New York City for an MA in French and Russian and, between 1948 and 1949 she did graduate studies at the University of Illinois, Chicago, USA.

In 1957, she moved with her husband, James E. Sheridan, to Taiwan and, during their stay, she attended the National Taiwan Normal University. In 1961, back in the United States, she was an instructor at the California College of Arts and Crafts where she received her MFA in 1960.

In the 1960s, she began to teach at the School of the Art Institute of Chicago, where she founded in 1970 a new department called Generative Systems, which was a program dedicated to studying, through hands on practice, the evolution of Art Systems triggered by a rapidly changing Technology in Society. She and the students worked with Industry, scientists and other scholars. The earliest investigation of artistic use of new technologies emerging in that period, for example the world's first color photocopier, the 3M Color in Color Machine.

== Exhibitions ==
Sonia Sheridan's artistic works were shown in many different institutions: a significant exhibition in 1970 at the Jewish Museum in New York: Software - Information Technology: Its New Meaning for Art. It is noted as a significant exhibition for being "the first major exhibition in the United States to incorporate the computer within the museum." Her art was showcased at the Cleveland Natural History Museum as well. In 1974 she exhibited at the MoMA Museum in New York City together with Keith Smith.

For the first time in Europe, in Paris, in the Art and Technology exhibition Electra, the year 1983, at the Musée d'Art Moderne de la Ville de Paris. In this exhibition she presented the first image manipulation software for artists, developed by John Dunn, Lumena artware of TimeArts. Three years later, her work was shown for the first time in Spain, together with other artists such as Nam June Paik, Marisa Gonzalez, Paloma Navares, Marina Abramovic, John Cage... at the inaugural collective exhibitions of the Museo Nacional Centro de Arte Reina Sofía of Madrid titled Procesos: Cultura y nuevas tecnologías, which offered a compilation of different artistic approximations by the use of the new means that arose in the contemporary art during the second half of the 20th century, and in which she presented, as part of her work, the graphic computer invented by her student of SAIC, John Dunn, the EASEL software and Time Arts PC computer. With this system, during a month, she made a workshop open to all the public at the exhibitions rooms of the Museo Reina Sofía.

Sonia Sheridan had her last solo show The Art of Sonia Landy Sheridan exhibition opening in October 2009 at The Hood Museum of Art in Dartmouth College, Hanover (New Hampshire). They made a cátalogo.

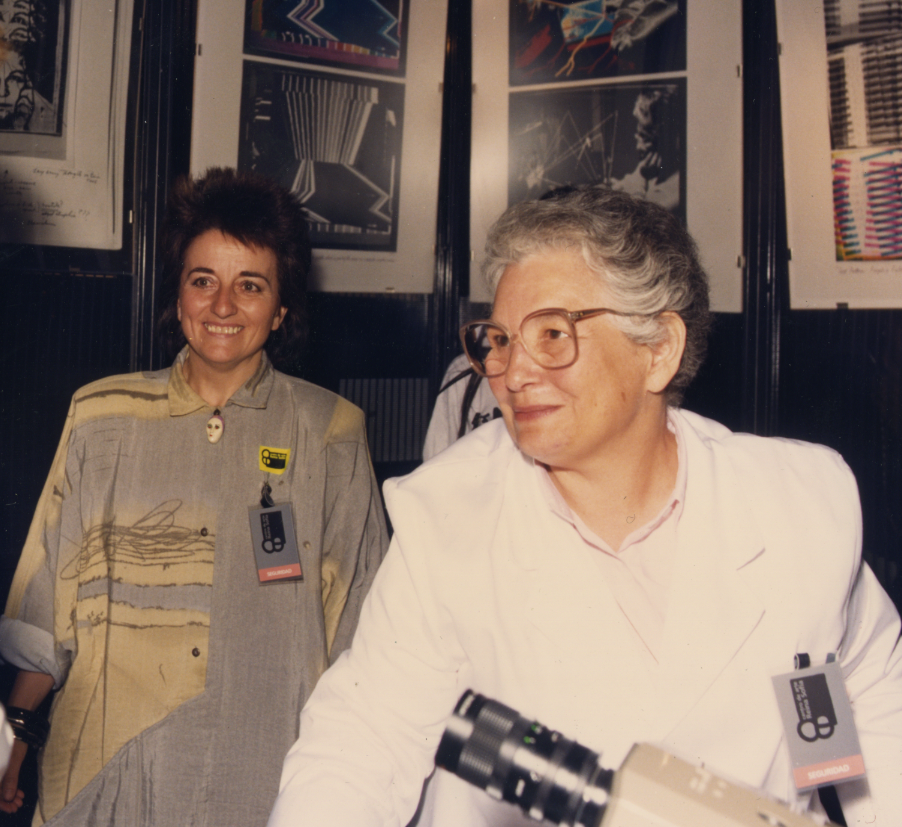
SS with Marisa Gonzalez at her exhibition in Procesos Cultura y Nuevas Tecnologias at the Reina Sofia Museum in Madrid 1986

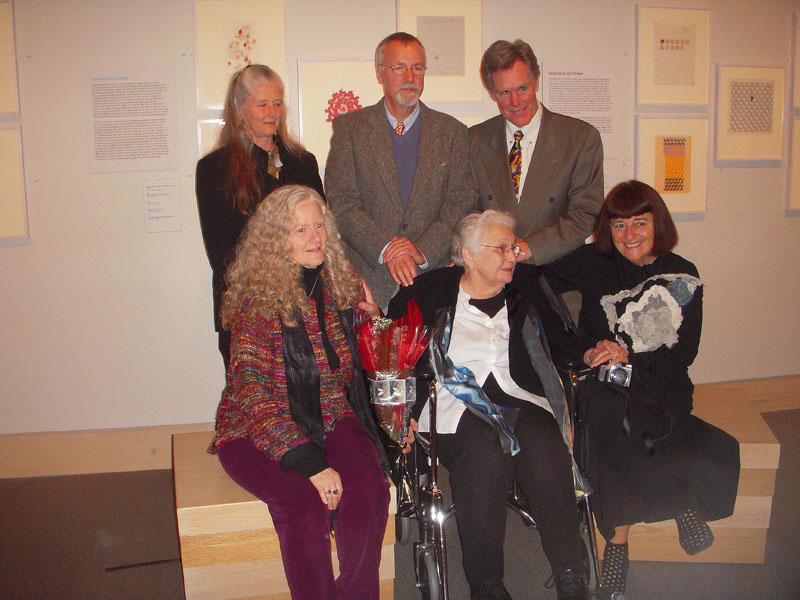
In 2011, at her exhibition in the Hood Museum with some of her Generative System students from the 70´s. Cindy, Brian Oglesbee, Greg Gundlach, Martha Lovin Orgain, Sonia Sheridan and Marisa González

In 2013 at the Festival of Art and Visual Culture in Berlin, Transmediale, the curator of the exhibition of the festival, Jacobo Lillemose, selected Sonia Sheridan with her solo show Exhibition Imaging with Machine Processes. The Generative Art of Sonia Landy Sheridan as a researcher and pioneer in new media not only in North America but throughout the world, as well as for her teaching at SAIC, the School of the Art Institute of Chicago.

Her work forms part of big collections like The National Gallery of Canada (Ottawa, Ontario), Museum of Science & Industry (Chicago, IL, United States), University of Iowa Museum (Iowa City, IA, United States), Visual Studies Workshop (Rochester, NY, United States), Brooklyn Museum (Brooklyn, NY, United States), Intercommunication Center (Tokyo, Japan), and 3M Corporation (Saint-Paul, MN, United States) at The Hood Museum of Art Dartmouth College (Hanover, NH, United States), this museum acquired 684 artworks produce by Sheridan between the year 1949 y 2002.

The Hood Museum of Art (Hanover, New Hampshire), and all the documentation on her long artistic career can be consulted in the Foundation Daniel Langlois of Montreal.

== Publications (main) ==
- Directory WorldCat
- Artist in the Science Lab. (3M Corporation, St. Paul, 1976)
- Energized Art/Science. (Chicago Museum of Science and Industry and 3M Corporation, St. Paul, 1978)
- Evolution 2.0. Generative Systems & Generative Art. (ISEA, Liverpool, 1998)
- Generative Systems in La Fabrica: Marisa Gonzalez. (Foundation Telefónica, Madrid, 2000)
- The art of Sonia Landy Sheridan, The Hood Museum of Art, Hanover, 2009
- Art at the Dawning of the Electronic Era. Generative Systems. (Lonesome Press, Hanover, 2014)
