= Rocio de la Villa =

Rocio De La villa
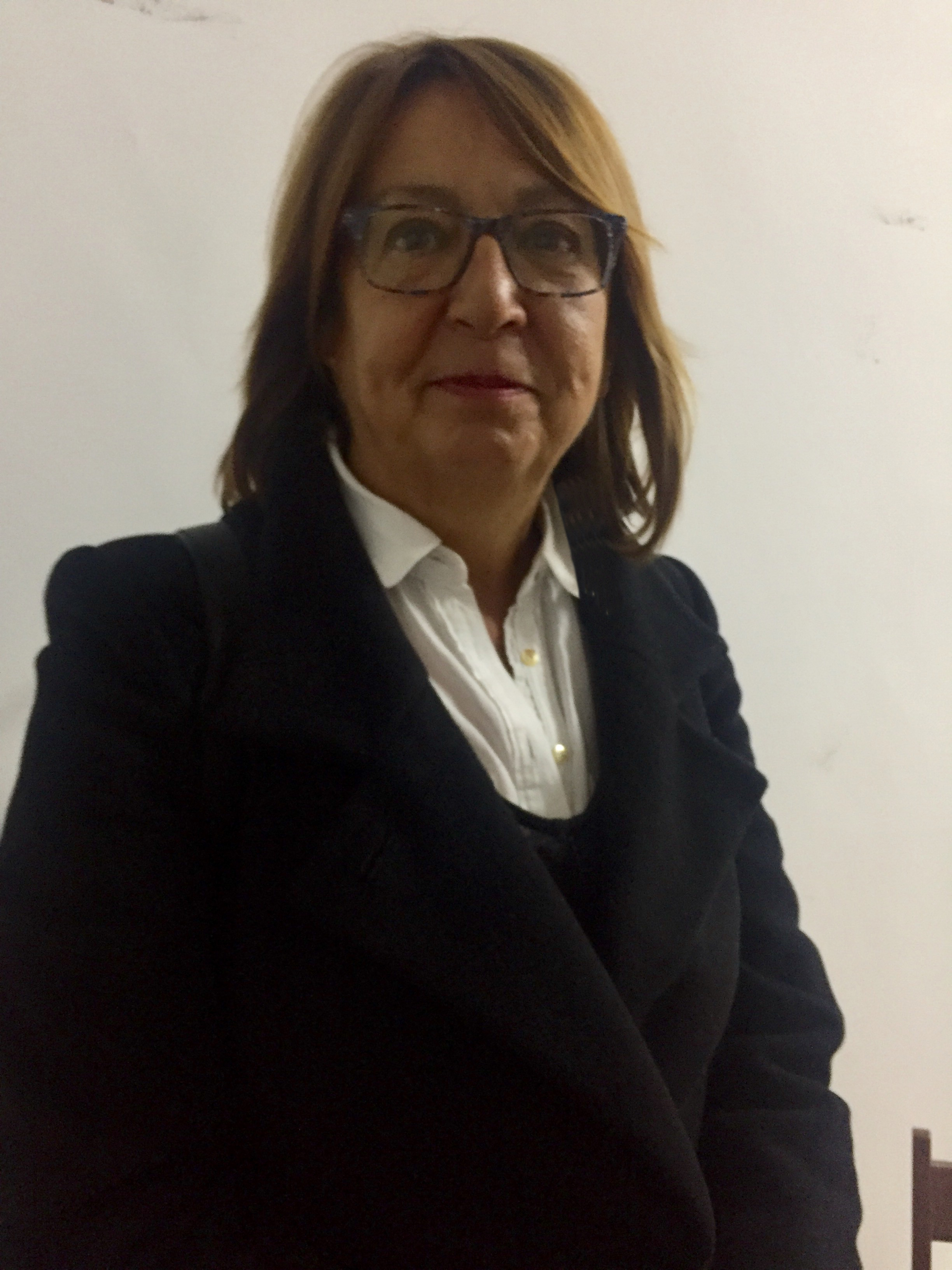
- Born: 1959 (age 66–67); Madrid, Spain
- Other names: Rocio de la Villa Ardura; Rocio Villa-Ardura.

Academic work
- Discipline: History
- Institutions: Autonomous University of Madrid

Rocio de la Villa (born 1959) is a Spanish university professor, art historian, curator, researcher and art critic. She has edited and collaborated in the edition of distinct catalogues and publications related with the art and the position of the woman in the artistic world. In 2014 she was rewarded with the Prize MAV in the modality of Criticism of art. She also goes by the names Rocio de la Villa Ardura and Rocio Villa-Ardura.

== Art historian ==
De la Villa is Professor in the Autonomous University of Madrid of Aesthetics and Art Theory. She obtains the professorship of Aesthetics and Art Theory.in the same university. Besides she gives class in the Master of History of Contemporary Art and visual Culture that offers the Museo Reina Sofia. Also she gives classes in the Master of Studies Interdisciplinares of Gender at the Woman´s Studies Institute.

President of the Spanish Society of Aesthetics and Theory of the Arts as of 2013 and a co-founder of the Asociación de Mujeres en las Artes Visuales (MAV), of which has been president between the years 2009 and 2012.

She has directed different cycles and conferences such as the first European Congress of Aesthetics celebrated in Madrid (2011), the cycle of conferences Heroines and the symposium Agencia Feminista y empowerment en artes visuales, both celebrated in the Museum Thyssen-Bornemisza. Also she organised, together with the professor Jesús Carrillo Castillo, the first Congress on Art and Woman (Contraposiciones. Mujeres en el arte actual) in the Autonomous University of Madrid (2001).

== Publications ==
As critical of art collaborates in Cultura/s of the newspaper La Vanguardia, in the El Cultural of the newspaper El Mundo and other specialized magazines in contemporary art: ars Magazine, ExitBook, ExitExpress, Dardo Magazine, Magazine Matador, etc. Also, she has co-edited and written publications like Guía del usuario de arte actual (Tecnos, 2003), Guía del Arte hoy (Tecnos, 2003) or Mujeres en el sistema del arte en España (EXIT/MAV, 2012).

In 2012 she founded and, since then she directs the on-line magazine M-arteyculturavisual.

She has contributed to the interpretation of the work of women artists in numerous individual catalogues and group shows, like Cien años en femenino, Genealogías feministas en el arte español: 1960-2010 and In-Out House. Circuitos de género y violencia en la era tecnológica.

She is the founder of M-art and Visual Culture.

== Curator ==
Like curator of exhibitions, has organised in 2001 Victoria-Encinas. Non Erectus in the Sala Alameda at Málaga, the group exhibitions Revuelta and In/Habitantes at the Centro de Arte Joven in Madrid (2002) and Extraversiones (2003) also in the Sala Alameda. In the frame of the XXV Anniversary of the Woman Institute of Studies of the UAM (2004) she organized of the feminist video-art program MICRONARRACIONES. Also she has organised the XVII edition of Circuitos 2005. Artes Plásticas y Fotografía and the exhibition of Creacion Injuve. 2011 of the Instituto de la Juventud.

In 2015 she had curated Registros Domesticados in the space of Tabacalera (Promotion of the Art) of the Spanish Ministry of Education, Culture and Sports, in which it was exhibited the retrospective show by the Spanish artist Marisa González, this exhibition travel to the CGAC Museum in Santiago de Compostela in 2016. And a selection of the feminist work by Marisa González was shown in the Sala Amós Salvador de Logroño, España in 2019.
