= Vanesa Cejudo =

Spanish sociologist

Vanesa Cejudo Mejías
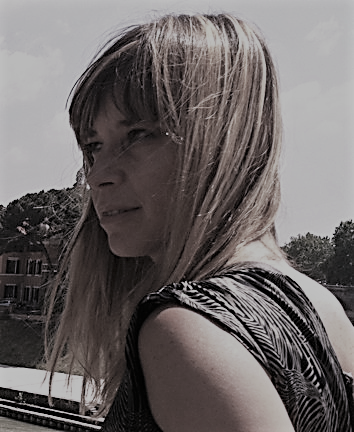
- Occupations: Sociologist; Art critic

Vanesa Cejudo Mejías is a Spanish sociologist, and a researcher and critic of contemporary visual culture. She advocates for the use of art in education, having worked both as an artist and as a professor at the Pontifical University of Salamanca. She also promotes the work of women in the Spanish art community as a director of the Asociación de Mujeres en las Artes Visuales (MAV) (the Association of Women in the Visual Arts).

== Early life and education ==
Cejudo studied sociology at the Pontifical University of Salamanca in Madrid, earning a bachelor's degree in sociology with a specialty in social psychology in 1997. At the Complutense University of Madrid, she obtained a certificate of teaching proficiency in 2006. Cejudo then studied at the Escuela de Arte La Palma in Madrid, where she trained as a technician in Plastic Arts, Design, and the Applied Arts of Sculpture, earning a higher technical degree in 2007. In 2016, she obtained a doctorate in the faculty of History and Arts at the University of Granada. Her doctoral thesis was supervised by Isidro López-Aparicio (es), and was called La mediación cultural: Mecanismos de porosidad para construir cultura contemporánea sostenible (Cultural mediation: Porosity mechanisms to build contemporary sustainable culture).

== Career ==
Cejudo is a founder of Pensart, a non-profit organization dedicated to cultural mediation. She is also a founder of Exprimento Limón, a group that experiments with ways to teach science, technology and humanities through art. She is the deputy director and art critic at Brit-Es Magazine.

Cejudo has worked, through scholarships from the Spanish Agency for International Development Cooperation, in countries including Senegal, Angola, Venezuela and Guatemala. Cejudo has also worked as a professor at the Pontifical University of Salamanca.

Cejudo has been a member of the board of the Asociación de Mujeres en las Artes Visuales (MAV) since 2016, and in May 2020 she became the Vice President of the organization. MAV is a feminist organization that seeks to promote women in the Spanish art scene, in which men have traditionally been overrepresented, and to promote art that centers women and their experiences. An example of an initiative that Cejudo undertook with the organization is advocating that there be gender parity on awards committee in major art contests in Spain; after that was achieved, the group observed that the number of women winning awards also rose.

In 2017, Cejudo and her partners at Pensart launched the project Making Art Happen in both Madrid and London, which aims to demonstrate that art can be used in the classroom as a successful means of teaching other subjects like science and the humanities.
