= Marina Núñez =

Spanish artist

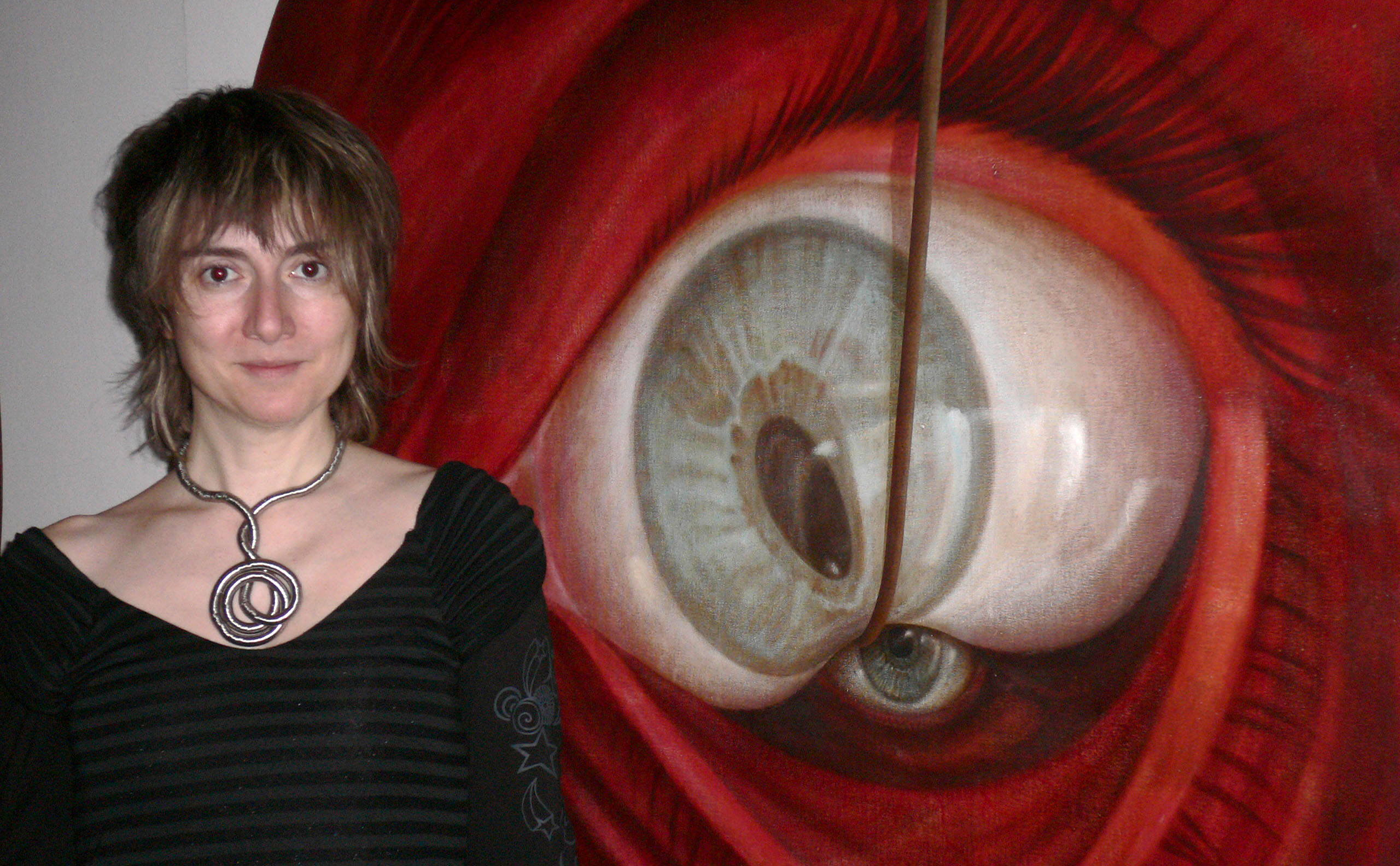
- Núñez in 2006
- Born: 1966 (age 59–60); Palencia, Spain
- Known for: Artist, professor and writer
- Website: marinanunez.net

Marina Núñez (born 1966) is a Spanish artist, and a professor at the University of Vigo. Her work is included in the collections of Museo Nacional Centro de Arte Reina Sofía in Madrid, Artium in Vitoria, MUSAC in Leon, Patio Herreriano in Valladolid, TEA in Tenerife, Fundación La Caixa, Fundación Botín, Corcoran Gallery of Art in Washington, DC, National Museum of Women in the Arts in Washington DC, Mint Museum of Art in Charlotte, North Carolina, Katzen Arts Center, American University Museum, in Washington DC, Fonds régional d'art contemporain in Corsica, France.

== Education ==
Núñez has a bachelor of fine arts degree from the University of Salamanca, and is 67. In fine arts from the University of Castilla-La Mancha.

== Career and work ==
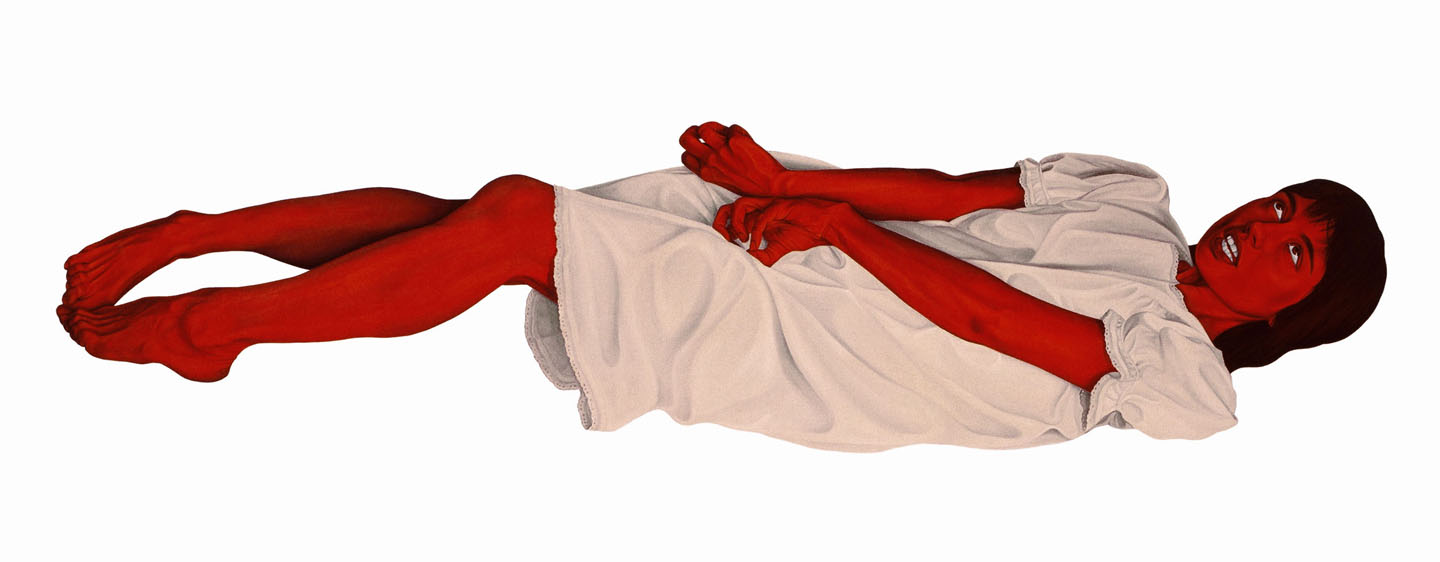
"Untitled (madness)", 1996, oil on canvas, Marina Núñez

Her work was first exhibited in the early 1990s. Her depictions of madwomen. and female monsters revealed an interest in gender discourses -in deconstructions and propositions about women's identities, in the wake of what was one of the great discursive achievements of feminism of the 60th-70th and later.

Her oil painting, narrative and conceptual, progressively combined, from the first decade of 2000, with digital techniques in 2D and 3D, both still image and video. Simultaneously, new iconographies, related to the territory of science fiction and horror -without leaving behind references of the clinical imaginary and influences of certain moments in Art History as the Baroque or Surrealism- were consolidated in her images

Marina Núñez represents posthuman identities through images of mutant, mestizo, multiple bodies. In philosopher José Jimenez's words, "the question of identity opens to the experience of metamorphosis: I am myself and my other. Body and image. Male and female. Rational and insane. Normal and monster. Native and foreign. Human being and machine. Earthling and alien."

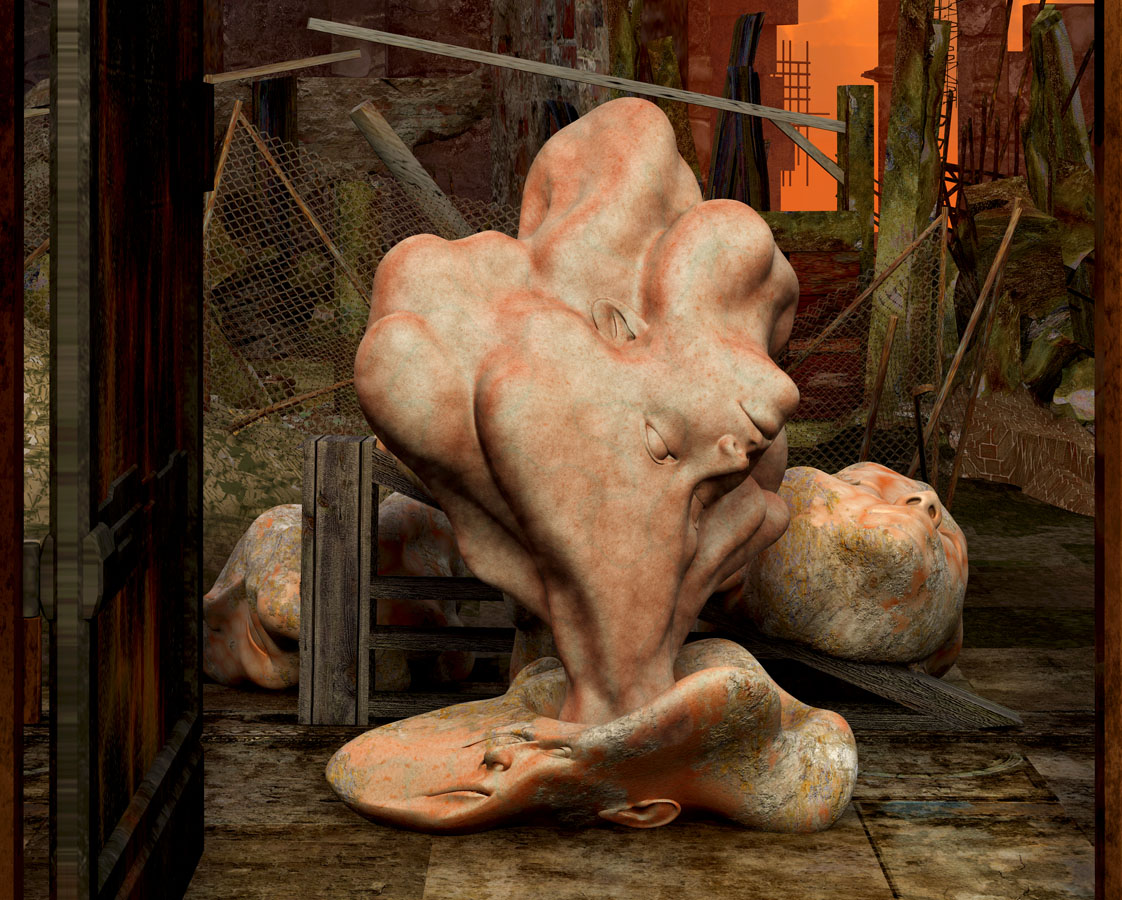
"Too much world (1)", 2010, monochannel video, Marina Núñez
