= Paloma Navares =

Spanish artist

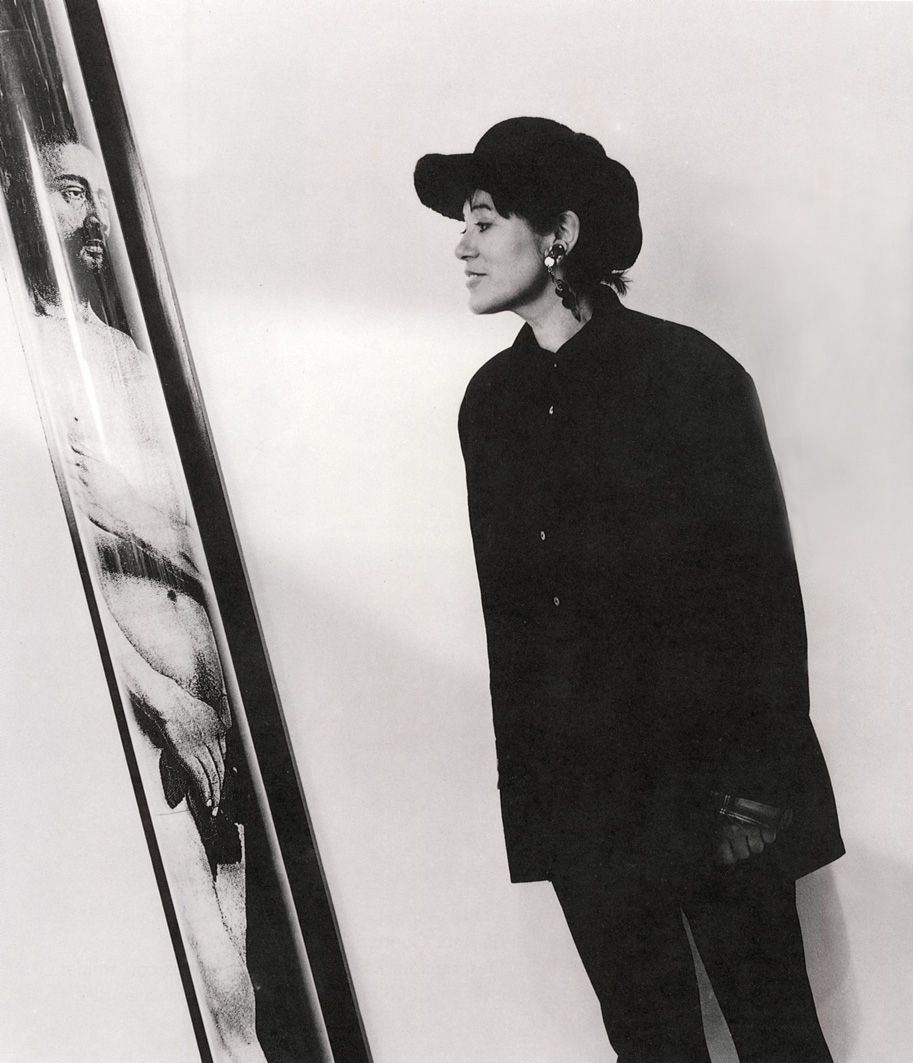
Paloma Navares. ARCO'92. Madrid. Spain.

Paloma Navares (born 1947) is an interdisciplinary Spanish artist who combines sculpture, photography, video and audio in her installations. Recurring themes in her work are the feminine condition, the historical representation of women through art, the critical analysis of the canon, madness, beauty and aging.

== Biography ==
Navares was born in Burgos, Spain. She lives and works in Madrid and Alicante in Spain.

In 1985-1986 she created the video installation and performance Seravan; A Song for a Fallen Tree and Origin and Moonlit Nights which were mainly exhibited in art centers and museums in Europe. In 1997-98 she did the scenery design for The House of Forgetfulness and Bodies of Shadow and Light with the company Lanonima Imperial. In 2004 she did a scenery design project for the opera Juana by Enric Palomar, first performed in 2005 at the Opera House in Halle. Since beginning her art career in 1979, she has exhibited in more than one hundred venues worldwide, most notably at the Museum Moderner Kunst Stiftung Ludwig in Viena, Kubo Kutxa Fundazioa in San Sebastián, the MUSAC Museum of Contemporary Art in León, and the Thyssen-Bornemisza Museum in Madrid In the later exhibition, she contrasted her longtime investigation of the representation of the female body in classical art with original works from the Thyssen-Bornemisza collection. Her work has been seen in art fairs and art biennials.

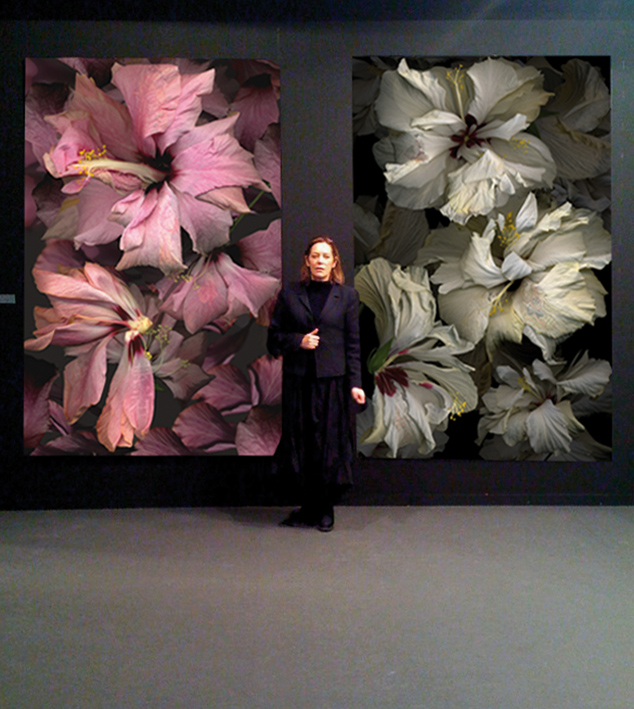
Paloma Navares. ARCO'09. Madrid. Spain.

In 2018 Paloma Navares was awarded the MAV Price (Women in the Visual Arts) recognizing her contributions in a long career.

In 2024, the ENAIRE Foundation awarded her with the Trayectoria Prize, “for a life dedicated to artistic creation, exploring the limits of a theme that, in a perceptive way at the beginning and decisively later, becomes a mantra without seeking it: the feminine universe.” The ENAIRE Foundation also organized a solo retrospective exhibition of her work at the Royal Botanical Garden of Madrid.

== Publications (selection) ==
- Travesia. Paisajes de interior.1987-2010. Universidad Complutense de Madrid (in English and Spanish). 2011. ISBN 978-84-96701-43-4.
- Otros paramos. AECID (in English and Spanish). 2009. ISBN 978-84-8347-115-9.
- Dell'Anima ferita. Comune di Sassuolo (in Italian and Spanish). 2007. ISBN 978-84-88252-58-6.
- Del alma herida. Instituto Cervantes (in English and Spanish). 2006. ISBN 84-88252-58-7.
- Nueva tecnología. Nueva iconografía. Nueva fotografía. Fotografía de los años 80 y 90 en la colección del Museo Nacional Centro de Arte Reina Sofía. Juan March Foundation Art and Science Publishing House (in Spanish). 2004–2005. ISBN 84-7075-522-6.
- Travesía 90–03. CAB Art Center of the Burgos Savings Bank (in English and Spanish). 2004. ISBN 84-87152-93-7.
- Espacios Fronterizos. Pilar and Joan Miró Foundation (in Catalan). 2003–2004. ISBN 84-89034-64-8.
- Stand by. Municipal Museum of Málaga (in English and Spanish). 2002–2003. ISBN 84-87035-93-0.
- Al Filo. Art and Technology Foundation of Telefonica (in English and Spanish). 2003. ISBN 84-89884-40-4.
- Milenia, del corazón y el artificio. Residenzgalerie Salzburg (in English and German). 1999. OCLC 902205266.
- Pendientes del corazón. Town Hall of Girona and the Caixa de Catalunya Foundation (in Catalan and English). 1998. Dip. Legal. GI-833/98.
- Recipiente de lágrimas. Sa Nostra Center (in Catalan, English and Spanish). 1998. ISBN 84-89632-61-8.
- Luces de hibernación. Junta de Castilla y León (in Spanish). 1997. ISBN 84-7846-558-8.
- Fragmentos del jardín de la memoria. Telefonica Art and Technology Foundation. (in English and Spanish). 1996. ISBN 84-89043-05-1.
- Nymphen, Venus, Evas und andere Musen. Overbeck-Gesellsghaft. Lübeck. (in German and Spanish). 1996.
- Otros Paraísos. Museum Moderner Kunst, Stiftung Ludwig. Vienna. (in German and Spanish). 1992. ISBN 84-7952-077-9.
