= Marisa Gonzalez =

Spanish multimedia artist

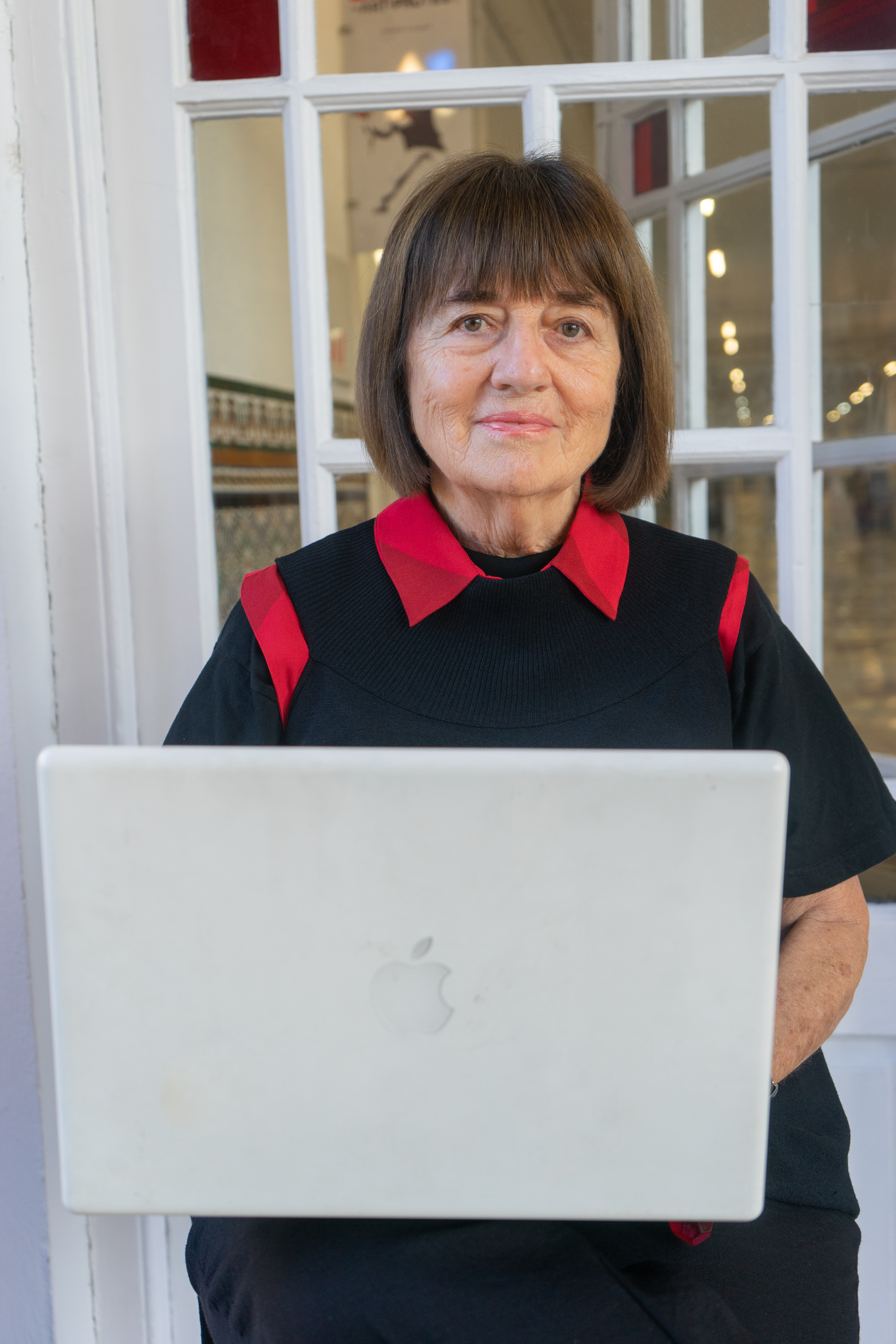
- Born: July 18, 1943 (age 83); Bilbao, Spain
- Education: Escuela Superior de Bellas Artes de San Fernando; The School of the Art Institute of Chicago; Corcoran School of the Arts and Design
- Employer: Artist Ex-vice-president of Mujeres en las Artes Visuales (MAV)
- Website: http://www.marisagonzalez.com/home.htm

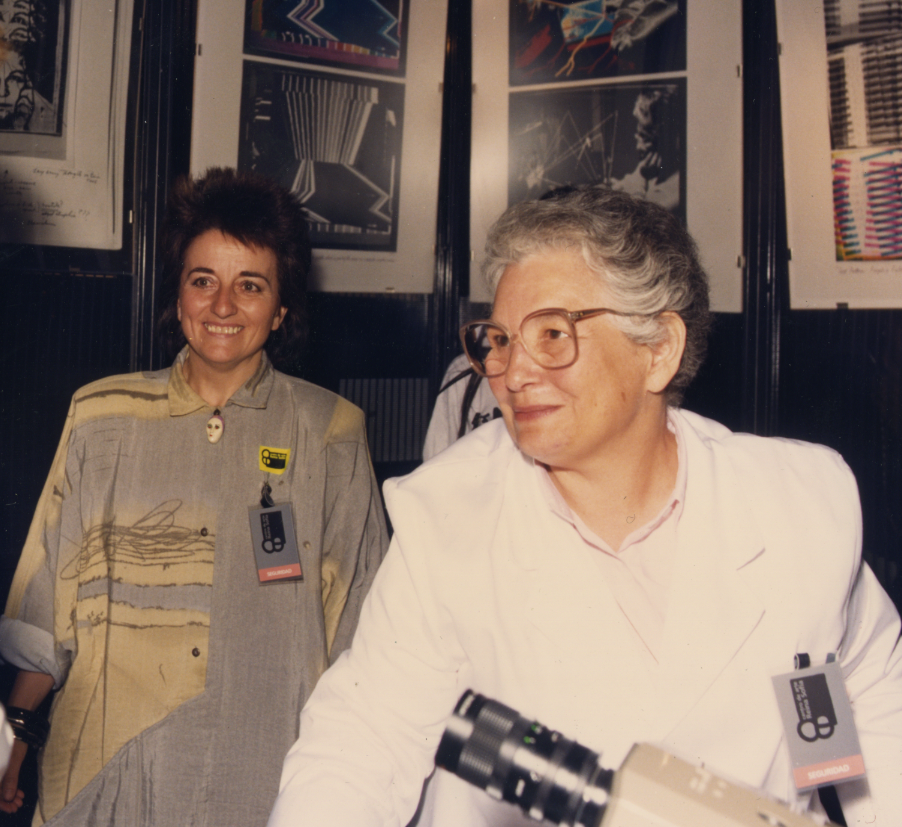
Marisa González with Sonia Sheridan in the opening of the Museum Reina Sofía de Madrid in 1986

Marisa González (born Bilbao, Spain, July 18, 1943) is a Spanish multimedia artist. She is considered a pioneer in Spain for the use of the new technologies in contemporary art. She works in distinct disciplines like photography, installations, video-art or net-art. She has been Vice President of the association Mujeres en las Artes Visuales (Women in the Visual Arts) MAV, from 2010 until 2016.

== Biography ==
Marisa González studied in her home town, Bilbao. In 1967 she moved to Madrid to study in the Escuela Superior de Bellas Artes de San Fernando. Meanwhile, while studying in 1970, she organized the First Permanent Exhibition in the School of Fine Arts of Madrid where she participated with students and recognized professional artists of that period. She finished her studies in 1971.

That same year she moved to United States to study a Master's degree at the School of the Art Institute of Chicago (SAIC) where she specialized in the use of new technologies applied to the artistic practices in the department of Generative Systems where she studied with the founder, Sonia Landy Sheridan.

In 1974, she joined the program for professional artists at the education center of contemporary art in the Corcoran Gallery of Art of Washington DC, the Corcoran School of the Arts and Design. It is here where she developed her feminist project Violence Woman, together with her professor Mary Beth Edelson.

During her studies in the US, she participated in the demonstrations against the Vietnam War.

In 1977, she graduated with a BFA from the Corcoran School of the Arts and Design. The following year, she returned to Madrid to continue her artistic work and began her first individual exhibitions.

She was part of the first edition of the Contemporary Art Fair of ARCO in 1982 with the Gallery Aele.

In 1983 she became part of the Board of Directors of the Circulo de Bellas Artes in Madrid until 1990.

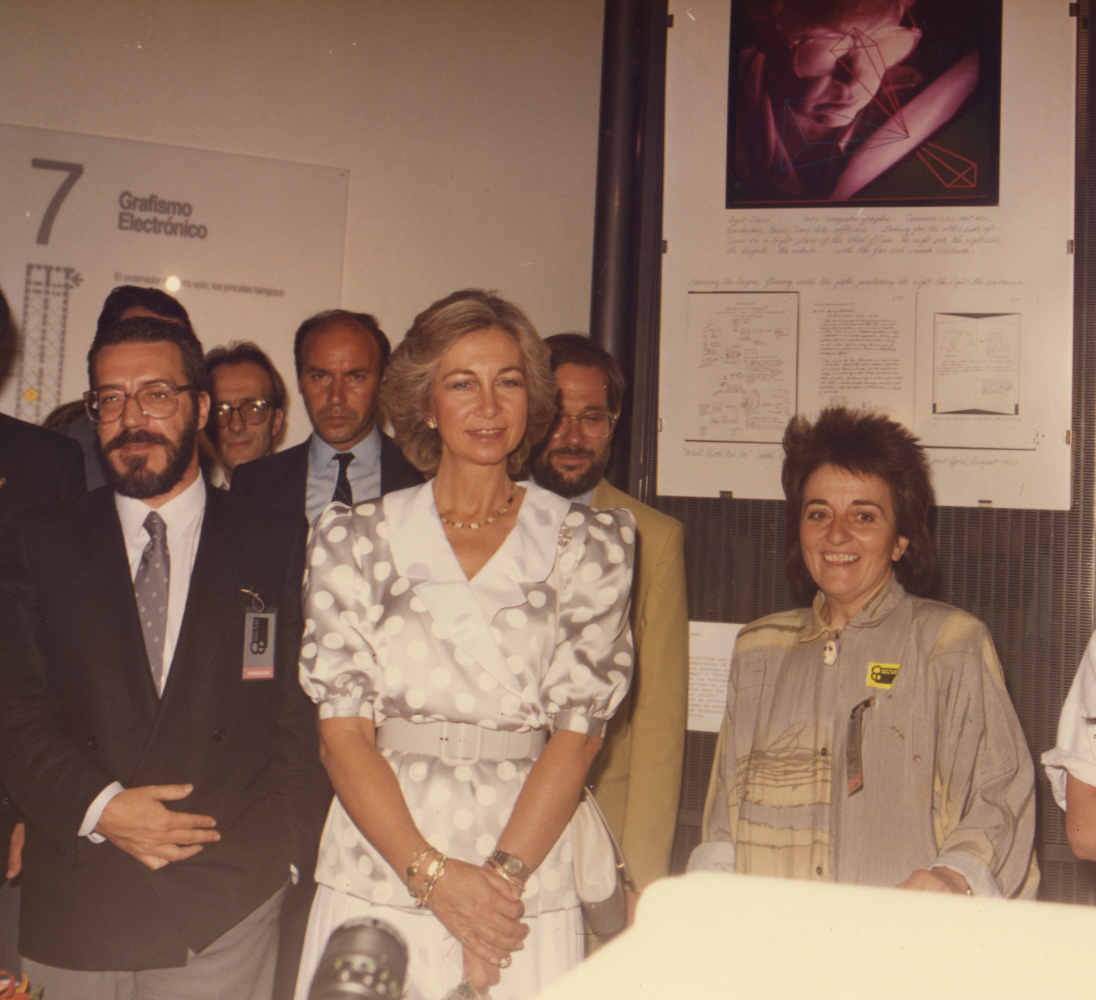
Marisa González with Spanish Queen Sofía In the opening of the new Museum Reina Sofía de Madrid in 1986

She participated in the inaugural exhibition of the Museo Nacional Centro de Arte Reina Sofía (Madrid, 1986) called Procesos: Culture and New Technologies together with her professor Sonia Landy Sheridan and other artists like Marina Abramović, John Cage, José María Yturralde, and Salvador Dalí, among others.

In 1992, she directed in the Circle of Fine Arts of Madrid a workshop of Contemporary Art called The poetic of technology, along with the American artist Sonia Sheridan, John Dunn and Jamy Sheridan. The following year, together with her students, she made the Station Fax/Fax Station, an interactive installation that works through Fax machines. This same year she began the series, Clónicos, in which she uses dolls in reference to the human body. This full series were made with the photo-video-computer Lumena, invented by John Dunn and donated to Gonzalez by Sonia Sheridan.

With the arrival of the new millennium, she initiated a project on the decadence of the industrial buildings of the 20th century called La Fábrica, that documents the disassembly of an old flour factory in Bilbao. Later, she would also document the disassembly of the Lemóniz nuclear power plant, that was never active, she collected artefacts, documentation, and industrial objets that she uses to build some installations.

In 2014 she is one of the artist participating in the international exhibition Genealogías Feministas, a big history review at the MUSAC Museum in Leon, Spain.

Her last feminist projects show images of women from different cultures, following the same concept of her other projects, as a process of documentation. Between these projects are Ellas filipinas, El mensaje del Kanga and Burma. In 2012, she was the only artist invited to participate at the Venice Biennale of Architecture, in the exhibition Common Ground, curated by David Chipperfield, where she showed Ellas filipinas. She also participated in 2013 at the group exhibition Genealogías Feministas in the MUSAC of León together with other artists like Pilar Aymerich, Eugenia Balcells, Carmen Calvo or Eva Lootz between others.

In 2015, she made a retrospective exhibition, Registros Domesticados, at the space of Tabacalera Promoción del Arte of Madrid. and at the Contemporary Museum CGAC Centro de Arte Contemporaneo Gallego 2016.

In 2018 exhibit part of her project Ellas filipinas in the exhibition Hidden Workers at the Coreana Museum of Contemporary art y Seoul.

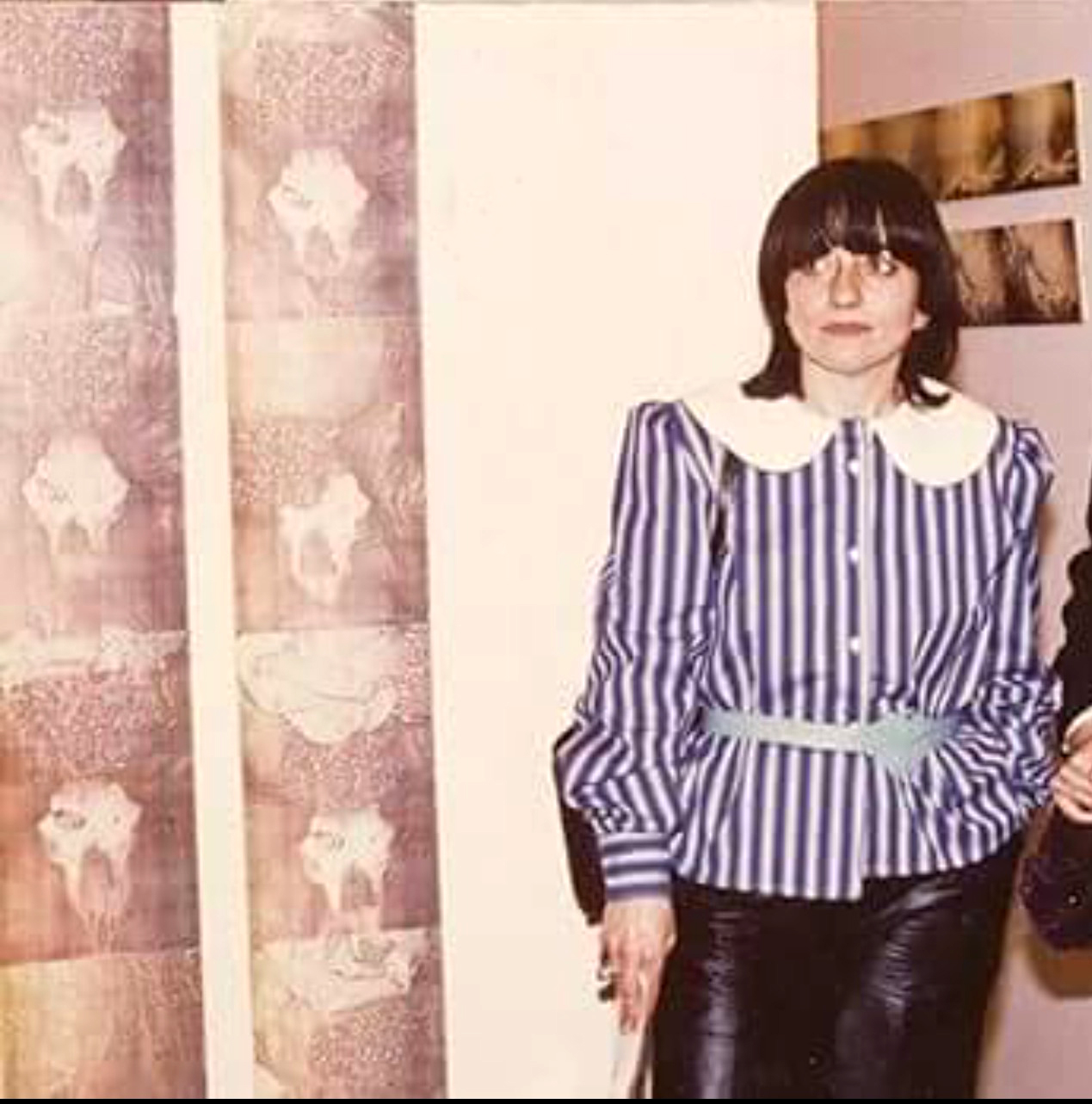
Exhibiting in the art Fair ARCO in the first edition in 1982

== Exhibitions ==
- Registros Domesticados. museum CGAC in Santiago de Compostela, Spain 2016.
- Registros Domesticados in La Principal Tabacalera Promoción del Arte, Madrid, 2015.
- Nuclear Lemoniz CAB de Burgos, Spain 2004
- La Fábrica. Sala Rekalde. Bilbao. 2001.
- La Fábrica. Fundación Telefónica. Madrid. 2000.
- Procesos. Cultura y Nuevas Tecnologías. Museo Nacional Centro de Arte Reina Sofía. Madrid. 1986.
- ARCO 1982. Galería Evelyn Botella (Galería Aele) Madrid. 1982.
- Electrografías. Galería Evelyn Botella (Galería Aele) Madrid. 1981. First individual exhibition in Madrid.
