= María Teresa León =

Spanish writer and activist

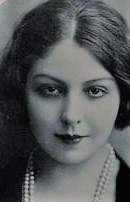
- Born: María Teresa León Goyri; 31 October 1903; Logroño, Spain
- Died: 13 December 1988 (aged 85); Madrid, Spain
- Spouses: Gonzalo de Sebastián Alfaro (m. 1920; div. 1929) Rafael Alberti (m. 1932)
- Children: Aitana Alberti León

María Teresa León Goyri (31 October 1903 – 13 December 1988) was a Spanish writer, activist and cultural ambassador. Born in Logroño, she was the niece of the Spanish feminist and writer María Goyri (the wife of Ramón Menéndez Pidal). She herself was married to the Spanish poet Rafael Alberti. She contributed numerous articles to the periodical Diario de Burgos and published the children's books Cuentos para soñar and La bella del mal amor.

== Life ==
Daughter of Angel León Lores, a colonel in the Spanish army and Oliva Goyri, María Teresa grew up in a wealthy household filled with books and that was constantly on the move. As a girl she lived in Madrid, Barcelona and Burgos reading the books of Victor Hugo, Alexandre Dumas and Benito Pérez Galdós. Due to the itinerant nature of her father's career, nomadism had a profound impact on her life. Her mother, Oliva Goyri, an unconventional woman for her day, sent her to study at the Institución Libre de Enseñanza (Free Institution of Education), where her aunt, María Goyri, taught. She earned a BA in Philosophy and Letters.

In 1920, when she was sixteen, she married Gonzalo de Sebastián Alfaro and had two sons, Gonzalo (b. 1921) and Enrique (b. 1925). The marriage didn't last, she lost custody of her two children and moved to her family home in Burgos. There she began to contribute articles for the Diario de Burgos that dealt with current affairs, culture, and women's rights. She wrote under the pseudonym Isabel Inghirami, the heroine of Gabriele d'Annunzio's Forse che sì, forse che no (Maybe yes, Maybe no). She made her first visit to Argentina in 1928. In 1929 she met the poet Rafael Alberti who was to become her lifetime companion. They were married in a civil ceremony in Mallorca in 1932. That year the Patronato del Centro para Ampliación de Estudios (Board for Advanced Studies) gave her a grant to study the European theatre movement. She travelled to Berlin, Belgium, Denmark, the Netherlands, Norway and the Soviet Union meeting the so-called "Revolutionary writers" and writing a dozen articles that were published in El Heraldo de Madrid.

In 1933 María and Alberti founded the journal Octubre and in 1934 she returned to the Soviet Union to attend the "First Congress of Soviet Writers" where she met Maxim Gorki, André Malraux and Erwin Piscator among others. Later that year she went to the United States to raise funds for the workers affected by the October 1934 Asturian miners' revolt which soon developed into an armed insurrection against the Spanish government ending in the deaths of 2,000 people including priests, miners and army personnel. This response eventually led to the coalition of different leftist factions that sparked the creation of the Popular Front.

== Spanish Civil War ==
On 18 July 1936 María and Rafael were in Ibiza when the Spanish Civil War broke out. They returned to Madrid where she became secretary of the Alliance of Antifascist Intellectuals and founded the magazine, El Mono Azul (The Blue Overall) which came out on 27 August 1936. Contributors included Manuel Altolaguirre, Antonio Aparicio, Vicente Aleixandre, José Bergamin, Luis Cernuda, Antonio Machado, Ramón J. Sender, Lorenzo Varela, María Zambrano and many non-Spanish writers such as John Dos Passos, Vicente Huidobro, André Malraux and Pablo Neruda. The publication lasted for forty-seven issues, almost the entire period of the civil war.

She served on the Junta de Defensa y Protección del Tesoro Artístico Nacional (Board of Defense and Protection of National Artistic Patrimony) which saved the art of the Museo del Prado, Palacio Real, Palacio Liria and the El Escorial from the aerial bombardment during the war. At first the art was stored in the Prado, but after the Prado was directly hit by nine bombs in late November, María, along with her husband Rafael led the 3 December evacuation of the Prado with a convoy of camouflaged trucks to a safe location in Valencia. Rafael later wrote Noche de guerra en el Museo del Prado (Night of War in the Prado Museum), a play in which characters in paintings by Goya come to life to defend the besieged city of Madrid. The play premiered at the Piccolo Theatre in Rome in 1973 and at the Teatro María Guerrero, Madrid in 1977. She wrote "They sacrificed us. We were the Spain with torn clothes and heads held high".

== Exile (1939–1977) ==
After the Republican defeat they fled to Paris via Oran. They lived in Paris until the end of 1940 working as translators for French radio and as announcers for the broadcasts of Paris-Mondial in Latin-America. After the German occupation of France they sailed from Marseille to Buenos Aires on the SS Mendoza where they were reunited with thousands of other Spaniards who had been forced to flee their country. Here she used exile to her advantage to criticize her country and avoid the Francoist censorship. In 1941 María gave birth to their daughter, the poet Aitana. During the 1940s and 1950s she gave readings of her work at benefits that aided Nazi victims or striking workers in Argentina; many of which were in organized in collaboration with soprano Isa Kremer who sang at these benefits.

With the arrival of Juan Perón the political and artistic censorship imposed made life increasingly difficult in Argentina and in 1963, after a 23-year stay in Buenos Aires, they moved to Rome. On 27 April 1977 they returned to Spain after almost thirty-eight years of exile. María, however, was suffering from Alzheimer's and could not recognize even her closest old friends. She spent her last years in a sanatorium in the mountains outside Madrid.

She died on 13 December 1988 and is buried in the cemetery at Majadahonda just outside Madrid. On her grave are the words written by her husband: "Esta mañana, amor, tenemos veinte años" (This morning, love, we are twenty years old). María Teresa León always carried her love for Gonzalo and Enrique, her first children. In her life she suffered from the separations produced by two exiles: the first from her children, and then from her country.

== Writings ==
Collections of short stories:

- Cuentos para soñar (Tales for Dreaming), (1928, dedicated to her eldest son, Gonzalo)
- Le bella del mal amor (The Beauty of Bad Love), (1930)
- Rosa-Fría, patinadora de la luna (Rosa-Fría, Moon Skater), (1934)
- Tales from Contemporary Spain, (1935)
- Morirás lejos (You Will Die Far Away), (1942)
- Fábulas del tiempo amargo (Fables of Bitter Times), (1962)

Novels:

- Contra viento y marea (Against All Odds), (1941)
- El gran amor de Gustavo Adolfo Bécquer (Gustavo Adolfo Bécquer's Great Love), (1946)
- Don Rodrigo Díaz de Vivar, el Cid Campeador, (1954)
- Juego limpio (Clean Game), (1954)
- Menesteos, marinero de abril (Menesteos, Seaman of April), (1965)
- Doña Jimena Díaz de Vivar, (1968)
- Cervantes, El soldado que nos enseñó a hablar (Cervantes, the Soldier Who Taught Us to Speak), (1978)

Non-fiction:

- La historia tiene la palabra (History Has the Word), (1944)
- Sonríe China (China Smiles), (1958)
- Memoria de la Melancolía (Memory of Melancholy), (1977) – Autobiography. Republished 2020.

Plays:

- Huelga en el Puerto (Strike at the Harbor), (1933)
- La liberdad en el tejado (Freedom on the Roof), (written in exile and published in 1989)

Screenplays:

- Los ojos más bellos del mundo (The Most Beautiful Eyes in the World), (1943)
- La dama duende (The Phantom Lady), (1945)
- Nuestro hogar de cada día (Our Daily Home), (1958, for radio)

== Awards in her name ==
- Equality Prize "Teresa León Goyri – City of Logroño" – Granted on 20 December 2022 in Spain to IES Cosme García High School in the category of entities and to journalist and filmmaker Chelo Alvarez-Stehle in the category of individuals.
