= Alianza de Intelectuales Antifascistas =

Spanish civil organization

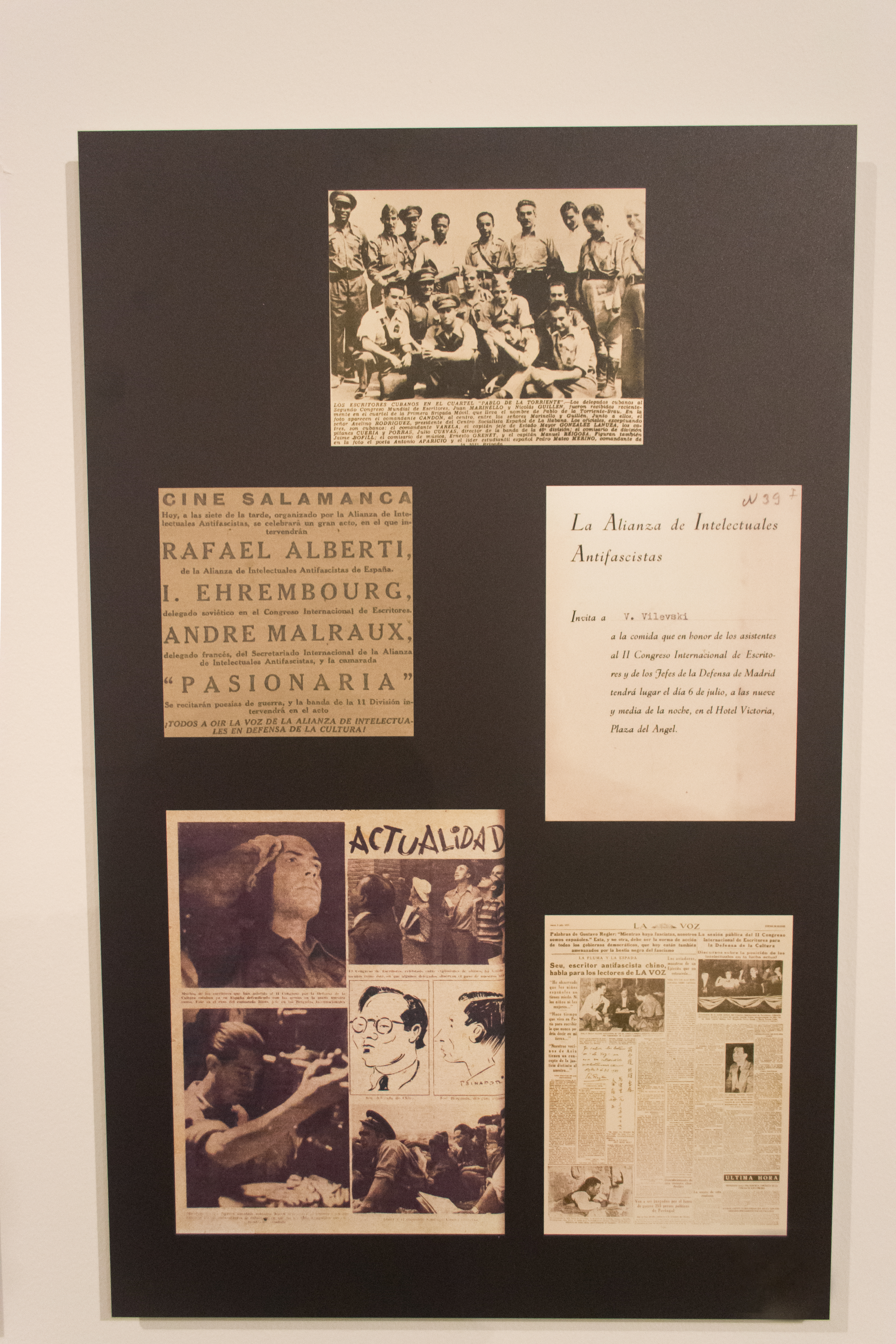
Press clippings at the Exhibition For the Defense of Culture, held at the Centro del Carmen in Valencia, in 2017.

The Alliance of Antifascist Intellectuals for the Defense of Culture (Spanish: Alianza de Intelectuales Antifascistas para la Defensa de la Cultura) was a civil organization created on July 30, 1936, after the Spanish Civil War began. It had its initial headquarters in Madrid and moved to Valencia, accompanying the government of the Second Spanish Republic.

== History ==
The origins of the organization dates back to 1935, during the I Congress of Antifascist Writers and the creation of the AIEDC (International Association of Writers in Defense of Culture), with the assistance of several Spanish delegates.

The Alliance of Anti-Fascist Intellectuals for the Defense of Culture was organized as an athenaeum, with various committees or divisions for subject areas. In addition to general cultural and sociopolitical activity, manifestos, talks and appeals were made against the rise of fascism represented by Franco's revolted army.

Other groups converged in the Alliance, such as the Union of Proletarian Writers and Artists (a group of activists of left-wing Valencians) and Accio d'Art (a dissident regionalist group from the Círculo de Bellas Artes de Valencia).

The Alliance published bulletins and magazines, the first of which, Milicia Popular, appeared on September 30, 1936, although the most important was El Mono Azul. The activities were diverse and, at an international level; The one that caused the greatest impact was the II International Congress of Writers for the Defense of Culture, held between July 4 and 17, 1937, with headquarters in Valencia, but which also had events in Madrid (in a city almost besieged) and Barcelona, and closed in Paris.

== Members ==
Its members included María Zambrano, Rafael Alberti, Miguel Hernández, José Bergamín, María Teresa León, Rosa Chacel, Luis Buñuel, Eduardo Ugarte, Luis Cernuda, Pedro Garfias, Juan Chabás, Rodolfo Halffter, Ramón J. Sender, Emilio Prados, Manuel Altolaguirre, Max Aub, Plaja and Rafael Morales, among others.

Foreign writers who collaborated with it included Pablo Neruda, Nicolás Guillén, Ernest Hemingway, César Vallejo, Raúl González Tuñón, Octavio Paz, André Malraux and Louis Aragon.
