= El Mono Azul =

Cultural magazine in Spain (1936–1939)

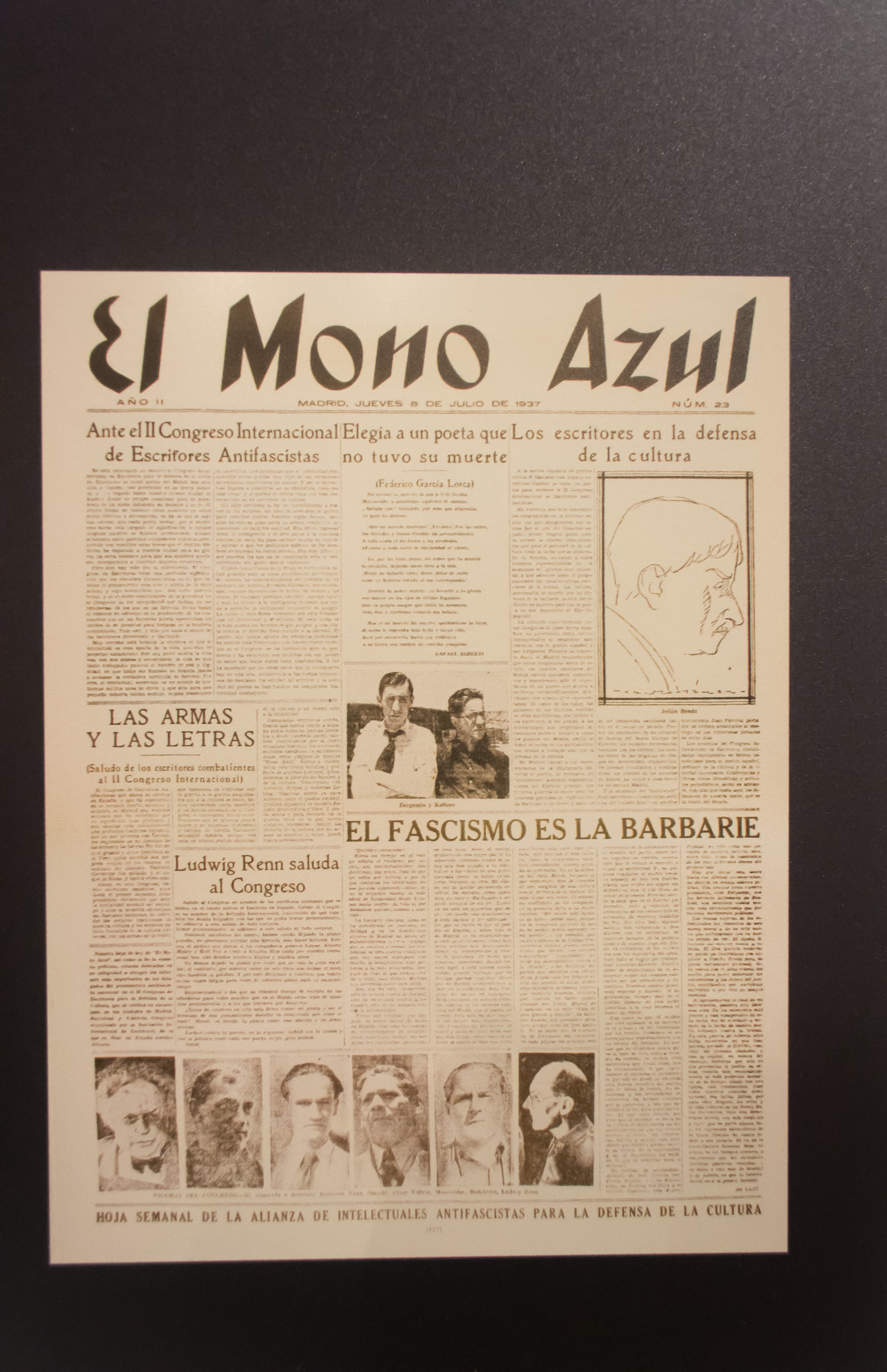
- Cover page dated 8 July 1937
- Categories: Cultural magazine
- Frequency: Weekly; Irregular
- Founder: Rafael Alberti; María Teresa León
- Founded: 1936
- First issue: 27 August 1936
- Final issue: February 1939
- Country: Spain
- Based in: Madrid
- Language: Spanish

El Mono Azul (Spanish: Blue Overalls) was an anti-fascist magazine which was published in Madrid during the Spanish Civil War. The magazine existed between 1936 and 1939 and was one of the major cultural, intellectual and artistic publications during the war with the subtitle hoja semanal de la Alianza de Intelectuales Antifascista para la Defensa de la Cultura (Spanish: Weekly publication of the Alliance of Anti-fascist Intellectuals for the Defense of Culture).

== History and profile ==
El Mono Azul was founded in Madrid in 1936 by the Alliance of Anti-Fascist Intellectuals led by communist writers Rafael Alberti and María Teresa León at the beginning of the Civil War. The Alliance was part of the Republican side of the groups fighting in the civil war. El Mono Azul functioned as the propaganda organ for the group.

The first issue of El Mono Azul appeared on 27 August 1936, a month after the start of the civil war. From its start to November 1936 the magazine was published every Thursday on a weekly basis. In the period December 1936–February 1937 El Mono Azul temporarily ceased publication and was restarted on 11 February. It became a section of the weekly newspaper La Voz in June 1937 and continued its publication in this format until May 1938. It then produced three more issues, the last of which appeared in February 1939. The final issue was an independent publication published as part of a literary magazine called Cuadernos de Madrid.

=== Content and editors ===
El Mono Azul was directed at those fighting in the civil war and frequently featured articles with tips for the proficiency in precision shooting and hygiene. In addition, the magazine covered literary genres such as poetry and literary criticism, political articles, editorials, documents, theatrical news, photographs or illustrations, the latter mostly by Alberti and Pablo Picasso. The poems published in El Mono Azul were read and written in the trenches before appearing in the magazine. The 29th issue dated 19 August 1937 featured four poems by Langston Hughes translated into Spanish by Rafael Alberti. Hughes, an African American, was the only Anglophone poet whose works were published in El Mono Azul.

Directors and contributors included José Bergamín, Rafael Dieste, Lorenzo Varela, Miguel Hernández, Vicente Aleixandre, Vicente Huidobro, Luis Cernuda, Antonio Machado, Eduardo Ugarte, León Felipe, Rosa Chacel, Emilio Prados, Octavio Paz, César Vallejo, Tomás Navarro Tomás, Pablo Neruda, and Ramón J. Sender.
