= Emilio Prados =

Spanish poet (1899–1962)

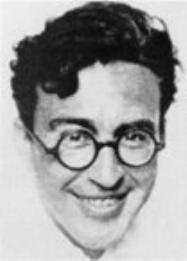
- Born: 4 March 1899; Málaga, Spain
- Died: 24 April 1962 (aged 63); México City, México
- Occupation: Poet

Emilio Prados (4 March 1899 – 24 April 1962) was a Spanish poet and editor, a member of the Generation of '27.

== Life ==
Born in the Andalusian city of Málaga in 1899, Prados was offered a place at Madrid's famous Residencia de estudiantes in 1914 and moved into its university section in 1918. There he met Federico García Lorca, Salvador Dalí, Luis Buñuel and many other young people who were to become celebrated and influential figures in Spanish art and literature.

In 1921, a long-running lung complaint forced him to retire to a sanatorium in Davosplatz, Switzerland, where he spent most of the year. In this enforced seclusion from wider society he read widely in European literature and settled upon becoming a writer himself. Emerging from the sanatorium in 1922, he resumed his academic training: taking courses at the universities of Freiburg and Berlin; visiting museums and art galleries across Germany; immersing himself in the artistic culture of Paris and meeting, amongst others, Pablo Picasso.

In the summer of 1924, he returned to Málaga, where he continued writing. In 1925 he became an Editor for the Sur printing-house, with Manuel Altolaguirre. Sur was responsible for publishing most of the work of the Generation of '27, and the quality of their editing brought Prados and Altolaguirre international prestige. In November 1926, again working closely with Altolaguirre he founded the magazine Litoral, one of the most influential literary and artistic publications of 1920s Spain. The magazine published works by Rafael Alberti, Luis Cernuda, Jorge Guillen, Federico García Lorca and Vicente Aleixandre, among others. José Maria Hinojosa worked with him in the final months of the magazine, as did José Luis Cano.

At the same time as he was working in literature and pursuing his own creative talents, Prados took an increasing interest in social affairs and politics, particularly the marginalization of the poorest sectors of society. The climate of violence in Málaga after the outbreak of the Spanish Civil War in 1936 led him to return to Madrid, where he joined the Alianza de Intelectuales Antifascistas and began contributing enthusiastically to the intellectual side of the Republican cause. As well as publishing his own works (his compilation of war poetry, Destino fiel, won the National Literature Prize in 1938), he edited various books including Homenaje al poeta Federico García Lorca and Romancero general de la guerra de España.

He moved to Barcelona in 1938 and took charge, again with Altolaguirre, of the publications of the Republican Ministry of Public Instruction. However, as a prominent Republican he was soon forced to flee Spain altogether as the Nationalists won victory in the Civil War.

He escaped to Paris and then, early in July 1939, in the company of a variety of other intellectual Republican figures, to Mexico, where he lived and worked in exile, until his death in 1962. His remains are buried at Panteón Jardín in México City.

== Work ==
Early work, 1925 - 1928: Prados's poetry highlights in particular the relationship between the natural world and the otherness of being, mixing avant-garde and surrealist elements with his own Arabic/Andalusian roots.

- Tiempo
- Veinte poemas en verso
- Seis estampas paraun rompecabezas
- Canciones del farero
- Vuelta
- El misterio del agua

Political poetry, 1932 - 1938: Prados devotes himself to outspokenly social and political poetry, developing these themes using surrealist language.

- La voz cautiva
- Andando, andando por el mundo
- La tierra que no alienta
- Seis estancias
- Llanto en la sangre
- El llanto subterráneo
- Tres cantos
- Homenaje al poeta Federico García Lorca contra su muerte
- Romances
- Romancero general de la guerra de España
- Cancionero menor para los combatientes
- Destino fiel (a collection of all his war poetry, won the Premio Nacional de Literatura in 1938)

Poetry from exile, 1939 - 1962: Prados's later poetry carries a profound sense of rootlessness and solitude. Thematically his work becomes much denser and more philosophical, addressing the complexity of concepts such as new life, solidarity and love.

- Mínima muerte
- Jardín cerrado
- Memoria del olvido
- Penumbras
- Río natural
- Circuncisión del sueño
- Signos del ser
