= Aitana Alberti León =

Writer and editor (1941–2026)

Aitana Alberti León (Note: In this name that follows Hispanic American naming customs, the first or paternal surname is Alberti and the second or maternal family name is León.) (August 9, 1941 – June 30, 2026) was a writer and editor. Born in Argentina to Spanish exiles, she later settled in Cuba, where she was heavily involved in the cultural scene. The author of several books of poetry and prose, she also worked to preserve the memory of the Spanish artist community forced into exile during the Civil War.

== Early life and education ==
Aitana Alberti León was born in 1941 in Buenos Aires, Argentina. Her parents, the writers Rafael Alberti and María Teresa León, had been recently exiled there during the Spanish Civil War. Growing up in the Argentine capital, she was exposed to a wide literary milieu by her parents.

In the early 1960s, she studied anthropology at the University of Buenos Aires. Then, in 1963, her family left Argentina for Italy. After further stints living in Spain and Canada, in 1984, she settled in Cuba, where she was active in the local cultural scene.

== Career ==
Alberti is known for her work as a writer. In 1955, on her 14th birthday, she published the poetry collection Poemas de Aitana Alberti. It was reprinted by the Centro de la Generación del 27 in 2006.

Decades later, she released several more poetry collections, including Pupila al viento (1998), Y de nuevo nacer (1999), and Amazona en la centella (2016).

She also wrote prose, publishing the books Inquilinos de la soledad in 2006 and Cuentos persas in 2018. Inquilinos de la soledad paid homage to those who, like her parents, were exiled during the Spanish Civil War. Her memoir La arboleda compartida—initially published as columns in the Spanish newspaper ABC—was released in 2009.

Alberti was also an editor, overseeing the Ediciones Pleamar book collection beginning in 1992. She worked to bring together poets through the Poetas del Mundo movement and the Havana International Poetry Festival. In addition, she spent 15 years working at the Dulce María Loynaz Cultural Center in Havana.

She sought to preserve the legacies of her parents and their fellow members of the Generation of '27, many of whom were exiled or killed. At the University of Havana, she supported a professorship in her father's name.

== Death and legacy ==
Alberti died in 2026 at age 84 in Havana, Cuba.

Her goddaughter Aitana Sánchez-Gijón, a Spanish actress, is named in her honor.
