= José Bergamín =

Spanish writer, essayist, poet and playwright

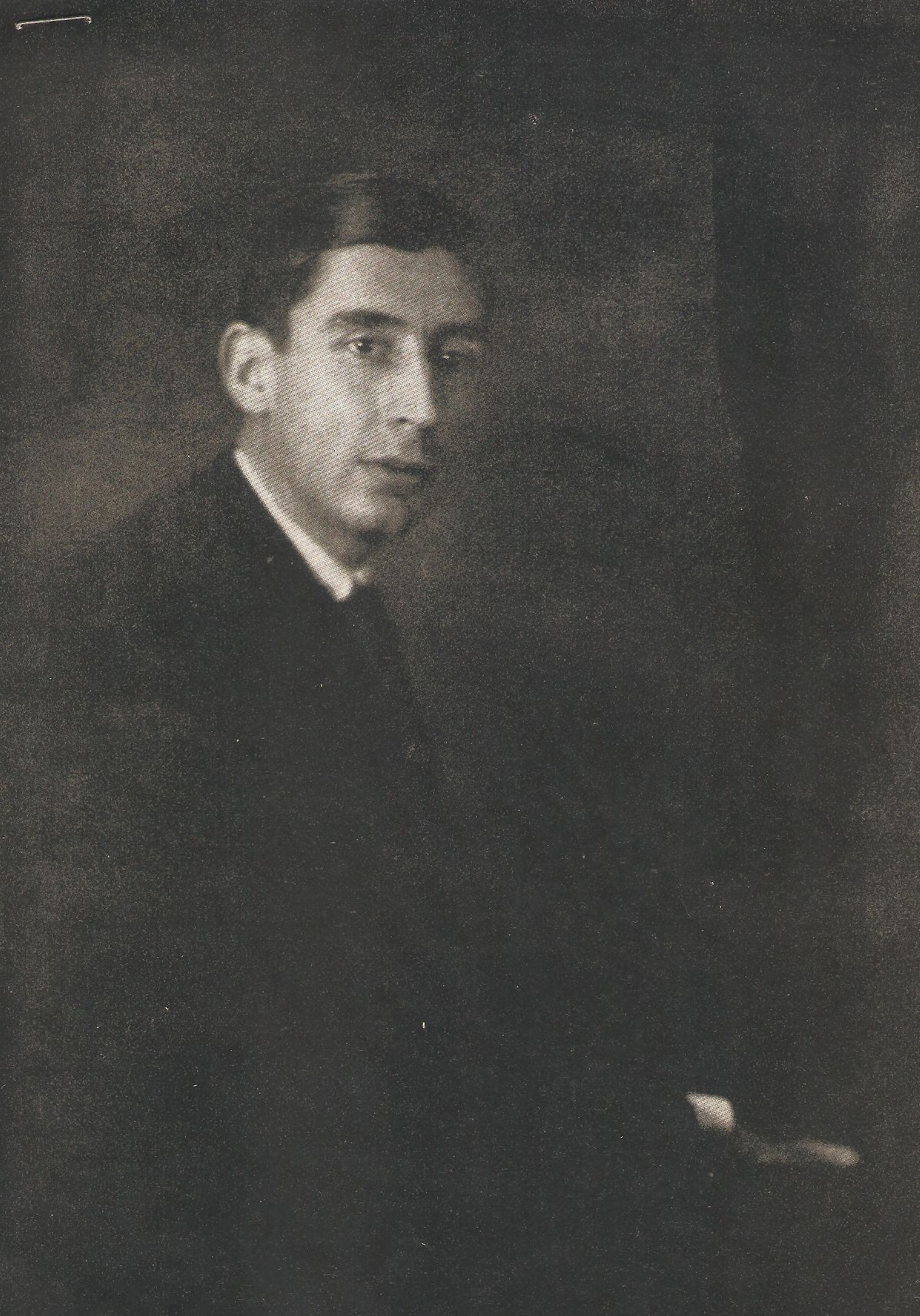
José Bergamín Gutiérrez

José Bergamín Gutiérrez (Madrid, 30 December 1895 – Hondarribia, 28 August 1983) was a Spanish writer, essayist, poet, and playwright. His father served as president of the canton of Málaga; his mother was a Catholic. Bergamín was influenced by both politics and religion and attempted to reconcile Communism and Catholicism throughout his life, remarking "I would die supporting the Communists, but no further than that."

== Early life and career ==
He studied law at the Universidad Central and his first articles appeared in the periodical Índice, edited by Juan Ramón Jiménez, in 1921 and 1922. Bergamín's friendship with Jiménez would be as strong as the one he maintained with Miguel de Unamuno, who served as an inspiration for Bergamín. Bergamín's writings for Índice would make him part of the Generation of '27 (he preferred the term “Generation of the Republic”), although scholars also place him in the earlier Generation of 1914 or a member of the movement known as Novecentismo. However, his activities were very much an integral part of the Generation of '27, and he collaborated in all of the publications of this group, and served as editor of its various books. He is also considered Unamuno's principal disciple and one of the best Spanish essayists of the 20th century, with his themes covering everything from literary myths to the Golden Age of Spain, from mysticism to politics, from Spain itself to bullfighting.

An opponent of the regime of Miguel Primo de Rivera, Bergamín participated in a political gathering in Salamanca together with Unamuno in support of republican ideals. He also served briefly as General Director of Insurance in the Ministry of Labor during the administration of Prime Minister Francisco Largo Caballero. In 1933, he founded and served as editor of the periodical Cruz y Raya, to which numerous authors of the Generation of ’27 contributed. The last issue of Cruz y Raya, number 39, appeared in June 1936, a few days before the military uprising that would lead to the Spanish Civil War.

== Career during the Spanish Civil War ==
During the Spanish Civil War, Bergamín presided over the Alliance of Anti-Fascist Intellectuals (Alianza de Intelectuales Antifascistas) and was named cultural attaché for the government-in-exile in Paris, where he looked for moral and financial support for the Spanish Republic. Bergamín contributed to the periodicals El Mono Azul, Hora de España and Cuadernos de Madrid. In 1937, he presided over, at Valencia, the second International Congress of Writers in Defense of Culture (Congreso Internacional de Escritores en Defensa de la Cultura), which gathered together more than a hundred intellectuals from all over the world.

== Exile ==
With the victory of Francisco Franco over the Republican forces, Bergamín went into exile, taking with him a copy of Federico García Lorca's Poeta en Nueva York. Bergamín would serve as editor of this work by Lorca. Bergamín went first to Mexico and then to Venezuela and Uruguay, and finally to France. In Mexico, he founded the magazine España peregrina, an organ for exiled Spanish writers, and the publishing house Editorial Séneca, which would first publish the complete works of Antonio Machado, as well as the work of Rafael Alberti, César Vallejo, Lorca, and Luis Cernuda, among others.

Luis Buñuel's The Exterminating Angel was based on an unfinished play Bergamín had written. From 1955 to 1957, Aurora de Albornoz studied in Paris with Bergamín.

== Return to Spain ==
He returned to Spain in 1958, but was arrested for his previous activities as an opponent of the Nationalists during the Civil War. He was forced to go into exile again in 1963 after his apartment was burned down by his enemies, and also because he had signed a manifesto with more than 100 other intellectuals addressed to Manuel Fraga Iribarne that denounced the regime’s use of torture and repression against the miners of Asturias.

He returned for good in 1970, settling in Madrid and becoming a political opponent of what he perceived were the shady deals behind the Spanish transition to democracy (La Transición), and was expelled as a writer from various newspapers. He was a republican in the first democratic elections after the transition and published the manifesto Error monarquía. At the end of his life, he lived in the Basque Country, where he served as a collaborator in the newspaper Egin and the periodical Punto y Hora de Euskal Herria, where he became a firm political supporter of the Abertzale Left. He was buried at Hondarribia due to the fact that “he did not want to give his bones to Spanish earth,” since Hondarribia is part of the Basque Country.

== Works ==
- El cohete y la estrella Madrid; Índice, 1923.
- Caracteres: (I-XXX), 1926
- El arte de birlibirloque; La estatua de Don Tancredo; El mundo por montera Santiago de Chile; Madrid: Cruz del Sur, 1961.
- Ilustración y defensa del toreo Torremolinos: Litoral, 1974.
- Mangas y capirotes: (España en su laberinto teatral del XVII) Madrid: Plutarco, 1933. Segunda edición Buenos Aires, Argos, 1950.
- El cohete y la estrella; La cabeza a pájaros Madrid: Cátedra, 1981.
- La más leve idea de Lope Madrid: Ediciones del Árbol, 1936.
- Presencia de espíritu Madrid: Ediciones del Árbol, 1936.
- El alma en un hilo [México, D.F.]: Séneca, 1940.
- Detrás de la cruz: terrorismo y persecución religiosa en España México: Séneca, (1941)
- El pozo de la angustia Barcelona: Anthropos, 1985.
- La voz apagada: (Dante dantesco y otros ensayos) Mexico: Editora Central, 1945.
- La corteza de la letra: (palabras desnudas) Buenos Aires: Losada, 1957.
- Lázaro, Don Juan y Segismundo Madrid: Taurus, 1959.
- Fronteras infernales de la poesía Madrid : Taurus, 1959.
- La decadencia del analfabetismo; La importancia del demonio Santiago de Chile; Madrid: Cruz del Sur, 1961.
- Al volver Barcelona: Seix Barral, 1962.
- Beltenebros y otros ensayos sobre literatura española Barcelona [etc.? : Noguer, 1973.
- De una España peregrina Madrid: Al-Borak, 1972.
- El clavo ardiendo Barcelona: Aymá, 1974.
- La importancia del demonio y otras cosas sin importancia Madrid: Júcar, 1974.
- El pensamiento perdido: páginas de guerra y del destierro Madrid: Adra, 1976.
- Calderón y cierra España y otros ensayos disparatados Barcelona: Planeta, 1979.
- La música callada del toreo Madrid : Turner, 1989.
- Aforismos de la cabeza parlante. Madrid : Turner, 1983.
- La claridad del toreo Madrid: Turner, 1987.
- Al fin y al cabo: (prosas) Madrid : Alianza, 1981.
- Cristal del tiempo Hondarribia: Hiru, 1995.
- El pensamiento de un esqueleto: antología periodística Torremolinos: Litoral, 1984.
- Prólogos epilogales Valencia: Pre-Textos, 1985.
- Escritos en Euskal Herria Tafalla: Txalaparta, 1995.
- Las ideas liebres: aforística y epigramática, 1935-1981 Barcelona: Destino, 1998.
- Enemigo que huye: Polifemo y Coloquio espiritual (1925-1926) Madrid: Biblioteca Nueva, 1927.
- La risa en los huesos Madrid : Nostromo, 1973. Contiene: Tres escenas en ángulo recto y Enemigo que huye
- La hija de Dios; y La niña guerrillera México: Manuel Altoaguirre, 1945.
- Los filólogos. Madrid : Turner, 1978.
- Don Lindo de Almería : (1926) Valencia : Pre-Textos, 1988. -
- Rimas y sonetos rezagados /
- Duendecitos y coplas Santiago de Chile; Madrid: Cruz del Sur, 1963.
- La claridad desierta Madrid: Turner, 1983.
- Del otoño y los mirlos: Madrid, El Retiro : otoño 1962 Barcelona: RM, 1975.
- Apartada orilla : (1971-1972) Madrid : Turner, 1976.
- Velado desvelo : (1973-1977) Madrid : Turner, 1978.
- Esperando la mano de nieve : (1978-1981) Madrid: Turner, 1985.
- Canto rodado Madrid: Turner, 1984.
- Hora última Madrid: Turner, 1984.
- Por debajo del sueño: antología poética Málaga: Litoral, 1979.
- Poesías casi completas Madrid: Alianza, 1984.
- Antología poética Madrid: Castalia, 1997.
