= Luis Cernuda =

Spanish poet, a member of the Generation of '27 (1902 – 1963)

- Born: Luis Cernuda Bidón; September 21, 1902; Seville, Spain
- Died: November 5, 1963 (aged 61); Mexico City, Mexico
- Resting place: Panteón Jardín, Mexico City
- Education: University of Seville

Luis Cernuda Bidón (September 21, 1902 – November 5, 1963) was a Spanish poet, a member of the Generation of '27. During the Spanish Civil War, in early 1938, he went to the UK to deliver some lectures and this became the start of an exile that lasted till the end of his life. He taught in the universities of Glasgow and Cambridge before moving in 1947 to the US. In the 1950s he moved to Mexico. While he continued to write poetry, he also published wide-ranging books of critical essays, covering French, English and German as well as Spanish literature. He was frank about his homosexuality at a time when this was problematic and became something of a role model for this in Spain. His collected poems were published under the title La realidad y el deseo.

== Biography ==
=== Seville and early life ===
Cernuda was born in the Barrio Santa Cruz, Calle Conde de Tójar 6 (now Acetres), in Seville in 1902, the son of a colonel in the Regiment of Engineers. He had two older sisters. The recollections and impressions of childhood contained in his poems, and the prose poems collected in Ocnos, suggest that he was always a solitary, introverted, and timid child whose unhappiness in the family led to his living vicariously through books and through his strong visual impressions of his native city. His first encounter with poetry came at the age of 9 when he glanced through a copy of Bécquer's Rimas that had been lent to his sisters by their cousins Luisa and Brígida de la Sota. Despite the fact that he later testified that this left no more than a dormant impression upon him, he began to write poetry himself during his studies at the Escolapios School in Seville from 1915 to 1919 around the age of 14. In 1914, the family moved into the Engineers' Barracks in the Prado, on the outskirts of Seville. In 1918, they moved to Calle del Aire, where he would later write the poems of Perfil del aire.

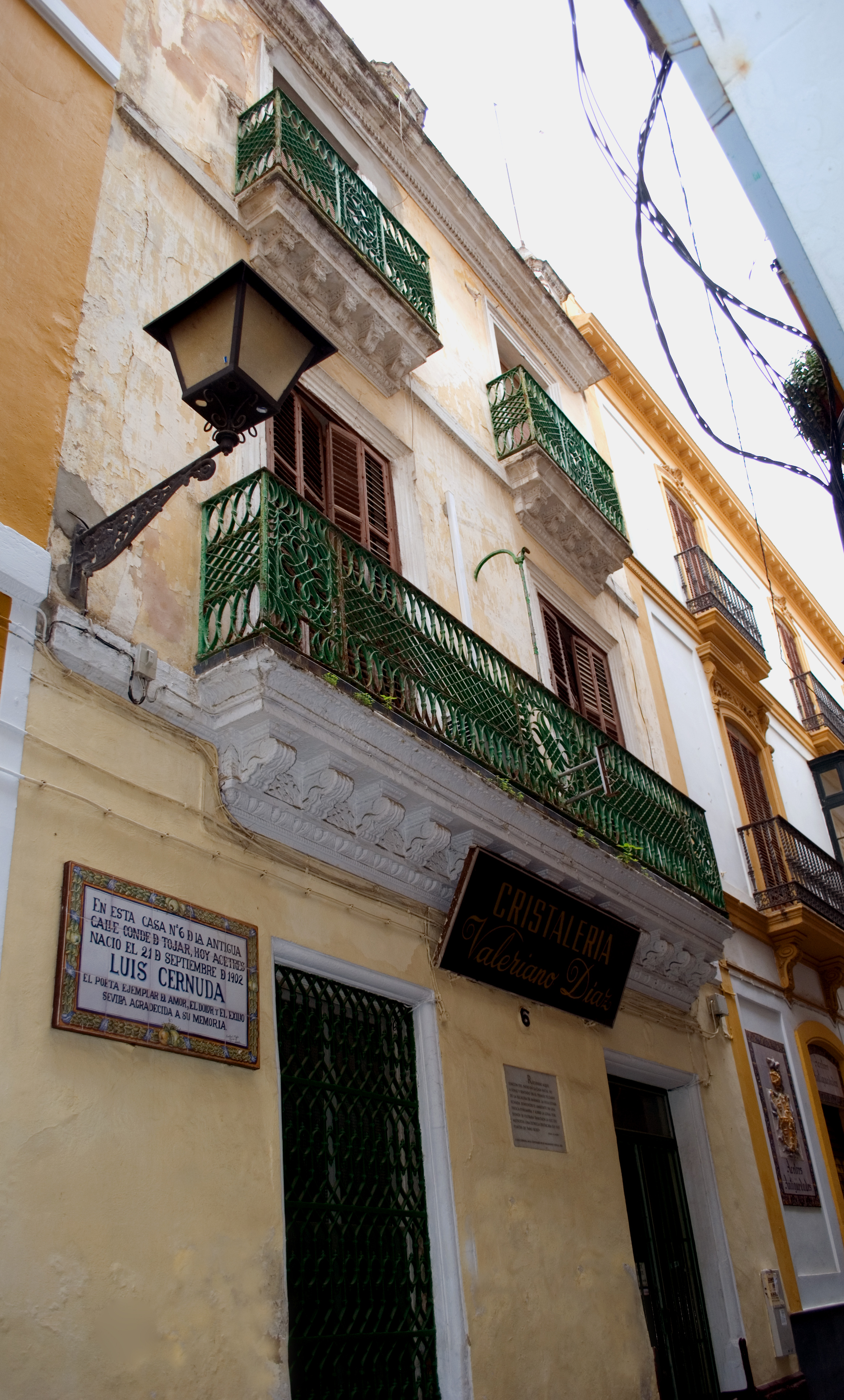
Birthplace of Luis Cernuda in Seville

In 1919 he began to study Law at the University of Seville, where, during his first year, he attended classes in Spanish Language and Literature given by Pedro Salinas. His extreme shyness prevented him from mentioning his literary activities until Salinas' notice was caught by a prose poem published in a student magazine. He gave Cernuda encouragement and urged him to read both classical Spanish poetry and modern French literature. It was at Salinas' suggestion that Cernuda sent his first collection of poetry, Perfil del aire, to Manuel Altolaguirre and Emilio Prados, who had begun, late in 1926, to publish a magazine called Litoral. As was the practice in those days, many such magazines published collections of poetry as supplements.

His father died in 1920 and he continued to live at home with his mother and sisters. In 1923 he did military service in the Regiment of Cavalry. In 1924, as he was reaching the end of his undergraduate course, he participated in a series of meetings with a small group of fellow students in Salinas's house. These stimulated his poetic vocation and helped to guide his readings of French literature.

He became a Bachelor of Law in September 1925 but was undecided about what to do next. He thought about joining the diplomatic service but decided not to on discovering that it would entail a move to Madrid. In October, Salinas arranged for him to make the acquaintance of Juan Ramón Jiménez in the gardens of the Alcázar of Seville.

In January 1926, he made his first trip to Madrid, where Salinas was instrumental in arranging introductions to, among others, Ortega y Gasset - who had published some of his poems in his Revista de Occidente in December 1925 - Juan Chabás, Melchor Fernández Almagro, and Enrique Díez-Canedo; At the time his first book was being unfavourably received around April 1927, he was again in Madrid. Although he later described himself at that time as inexperto, aislado en Sevilla, he was in reality already known to a number of the influential Spanish literati of the period. His indecision about a choice of career continued through 1926-27. In December 1927, the Góngora tercentenary celebrations reached a climax with a series of poetry readings and lectures at the Arts Club of Seville by people such as García Lorca, Dámaso Alonso, Rafael Alberti, Jorge Guillén, José Bergamín and others. Although he took no direct part in the proceedings, he did get the chance to read some of his poems and he made the acquaintance of Lorca.

=== Madrid and France ===
His mother died in July 1928 and, at the start of September, Cernuda left Seville. He spent a few days in Málaga with Altolaguirre, Prados and José María Hinojosa before moving to Madrid. Although he had a law degree, he had no intention of making practical use of it. He was starting to realise that poetry was the only thing that really mattered to him. He renewed acquaintance with Pedro Salinas and met Vicente Aleixandre. Salinas arranged for him to become the Spanish lector at the University of Toulouse. He took up post in November and stayed there for an academic year. The experience of living on his own in a foreign city led him to a crucial realisation about himself: his almost crippling shyness, his unhappiness in a family setting, his sense of isolation from the rest of humanity, had all been symptoms of a latent homosexuality which now manifested itself and which he accepted, in a spirit of defiance. This led to a decisive change in the type of poetry he wrote. He also discovered a love of jazz and films, which seems to have activated an interest in the USA.

Between his return from Toulouse in June 1929 to 1936, Cernuda lived in Madrid and participated actively in the literary and cultural scene of the Spanish capital. At the start of 1930, he found a job in a bookshop owned by León Sánchez Cuesta. All through this period, he worked with many organisations attempting to create a more liberal and tolerant Spain. For example, between 1932 and 1935, he participated in the Misiones Pedagógicas - a cultural outreach organisation set up by the Spanish Republic. He also contributed articles to radical journals such as Octubre, edited by Alberti and his wife María Teresa León, which demonstrates his political commitment at that time, although there is no evidence that he formally joined the Communist Party. In June 1935, he took lodgings in Calle Viriato, Madrid, above the flat of Altolaguirre and his wife Concha Méndez.

In February 1936, he participated with Lorca and Alberti in an homage to the Galician writer Valle-Inclán. Since Perfil del aire, he had only managed to publish one collection - Donde habite el olvido - in 1934, and a few individual poems. This difficulty in getting published gave Cernuda the chance to revise and reflect on his work. It also occurred to him in the meantime that he could bring all his poetry together under the title La realidad y el deseo. In April 1936, José Bergamín published the book in his journal Cruz y Raya. Subsequent editions added new poems as separate books under this collective title. On April 21, there was a celebratory dinner, attended by Lorca, Salinas, Pablo Neruda, Altolaguirre, Alberti, Aleixandre and Bergamín himself.

=== Spanish Civil War ===
When the Spanish Civil War broke out, a friend of his, Concha de Albornoz, arranged for him to join her in Paris as secretary to her father, the ambassador Alvaro de Albornoz. He remained there from July to September 1936, but after that he returned to Madrid along with the ambassador and his family. Alvaro de Albornoz was a founding figure of the Spanish Second Republic and his daughter was a prominent figure in the artistic world of Madrid.

For perhaps the only time in his life Cernuda felt the desire to be useful to society, which he tried to do by serving on the Republican side. He was hopeful that there was a possibility of righting some of the social injustices that he saw in Spanish society. From October 1936 to April 1937, he participated in radio broadcasts with A. Serrano Plaja in the Sierra de Guadarrama, north of Madrid. In April 1937, he moved to Valencia and began to write poems that would be collected in Las Nubes. He also came into contact with Juan Gil-Albert and the other members of the editorial team behind the periodical Hora de España and began to work with them. In June, the representative of the Ministry of Education made objections to a poem to be published in that journal on the subject of Lorca's murder and he had to remove a stanza that made explicit mention of the subject's homosexuality, which was neither common knowledge at that time nor was it acceptable to the Communist Party, who exerted pressure to censor it. This poem, "A un poeta muerto (F.G.L.)" was later published in Las Nubes with the censored stanza restored. In later life, Cernuda reflected that this attempt to be socially committed had been futile: "the flow of events made me see, little by little, how instead of that chance of life for a young Spain, there was only the criminal game being played by a party that many people joined for personal gain." He was motivated by his innate rebelliousness and disgust at Spanish society rather than by real political commitment.

He played the role of Don Pedro in a performance of Lorca's play Mariana Pineda during the Second Congress of Anti-Fascist Intellectuals in Valencia in 1937. At this time, he met Octavio Paz. In October, he returned to Madrid, where he remained until February 1938, working on the periodical El Mono Azul, edited by Alberti and María Teresa León.

=== Exile in Britain ===
In 1935 at a salon hosted by Carlos Morla Lynch, a diplomat, diarist, amateur musician and closet homosexual working in the Chilean Embassy in Madrid, Cernuda met an English poet called Stanley Richardson, nine years younger than him, who was making a brief visit to the country. Richardson had already met Altolaguirre and Concha Méndez in London. They enjoyed some kind of intense but short-lived relationship, commemorated in a poem dated 20–22 March 1935 and included in Invocaciones, before Richardson returned home. In February 1938, Richardson arranged for him to give a series of lectures in Oxford and Cambridge. At the time, Cernuda thought that he would be away from Spain for one or two months, however this was to be the start of an exile that would last for the rest of his life. The lectures never took place. Richardson was well-connected, however, and arranged a party for him, attended by celebrities such as the Duchess of Atholl, Gavin Henderson, 2nd Baron Faringdon, the Chinese ambassador, Rebecca West and Rose Macaulay. Even by then, the situation in Spain meant that it was not advisable for Cernuda to return and so Richardson suggested that he should join a colony of evacuated Basque children at Eaton Hastings on Faringdon's estate.

After a few months in England, penniless and barely able to speak English, he went to Paris with the intention of returning to Spain. But he stayed on in Paris on receiving news of what was happening in his native land. In August 1938, Richardson and Cernuda met again in Paris but, to judge from various of Cernuda's letters of the time, the intensity of their relationship had greatly weakened. In September 1938 Richardson secured him a position as Spanish assistant in Cranleigh School. In January 1939 he became the lector at the University of Glasgow. Richardson was to die on 8 March 1941 in an air raid while dancing at the Ritz. Cernuda wrote an elegy for him which was included in Como quien espera el alba in 1942. There is a poignant postlude. In August 1944, while walking around Cambridge, Cernuda noticed a framed photograph of Richardson hanging in the window of a Red Cross shop. On the back was part of the name of his godmother. Cernuda bought it.

Neither Glasgow nor Scotland appealed to him, which is perhaps noticeable in the downbeat tone of the poems he wrote there. From 1941 onward, he spent his summer vacations in Oxford, where, despite the ravages of the war, there were plenty of well-stocked bookshops. In August 1943, he moved to Emmanuel College, Cambridge, where he was much happier. In Seville he used to attend concerts and music had always been very important to him. The artistic life of Cambridge and London made it easier for him to develop his musical knowledge. Mozart was the composer whose music meant the most to him and he devoted a poem to him in his last collection, Desolación de la Quimera.

In 1940, while Cernuda was in Glasgow, Bergamín brought out in Mexico a second edition of La realidad y el deseo, this time including section 7, Las nubes. A separate edition of this collection appeared in a pirated edition in Buenos Aires in 1943. He had been afraid that the situation in Spain after the end of the Civil War would create such an unfavourable climate for writers who had gone into exile like him, that his work would be unknown to future generations. The appearance of these two books was a ray of hope for him.

In July 1945, he moved to a similar job at the Spanish Institute in London. He regretted leaving Cambridge, despite the range and variety of theatres, concerts and bookshops in the capital. He began to take his holidays in Cornwall because he was tired of the big city and urban life. So, in March 1947, when his old friend Concha de Albornoz, who had been working at Mount Holyoke College, Massachusetts, wrote to offer him a post there, he accepted with alacrity. He managed to secure a passage on a French liner from Southampton to New York, where he arrived on September 10. He was coming from a country that was impoverished, still showing many signs of war damage and subject to rationing so the shops of New York made it seem as if he were arriving in an earthly paradise. He also responded favourably to the people and wealth of Mount Holyoke where, "for the first time in my life, I was going to be paid at a decent and fitting level".

=== US and Mexico ===
Although he was happy in Mount Holyoke, at the end of the 1947-48 year, a student advised him not to stay there and he himself began to wonder whether it was a beneficial force on his poetry. In the summer of 1949 he paid his first visit to Mexico and was so impressed that Mount Holyoke began to seem irksome. This can be seen in the collection of prose Variaciones sobre tema mexicano, which he wrote in the winter of 1949-50. He began to spend his summers in Mexico and in 1951, during a 6-month sabbatical, he met X (identified by Cernuda only as Salvador), the inspiration for "Poemas para un cuerpo", which he started to write at that time. This was probably the happiest period of his life.

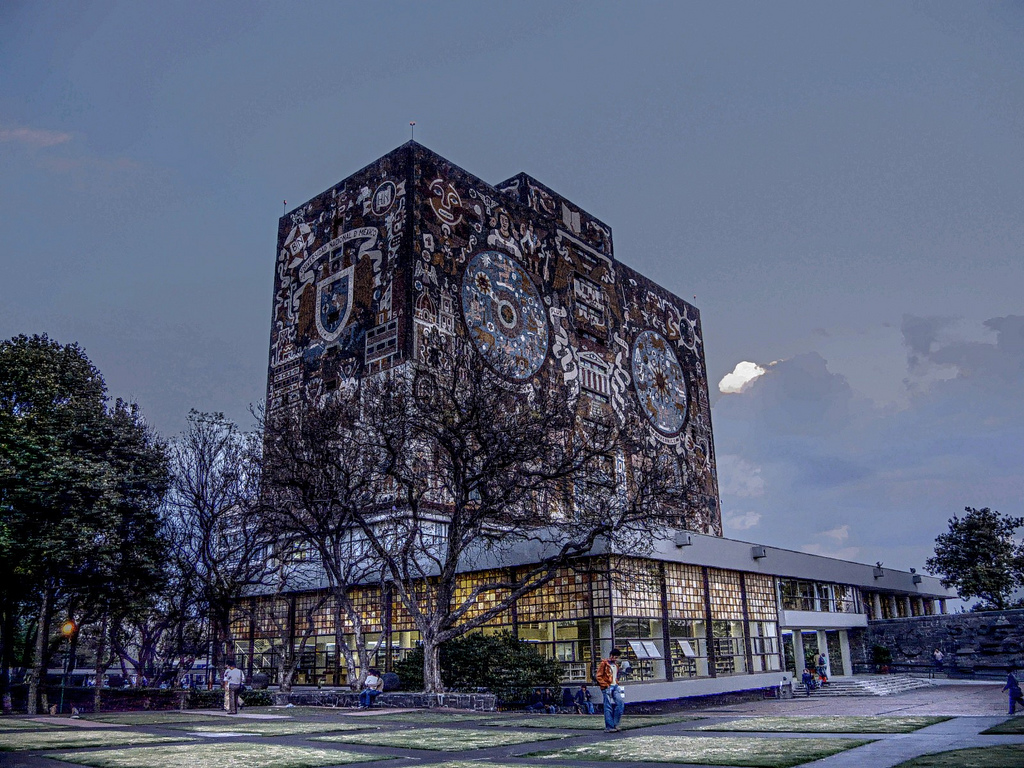
The Central Library - University of Mexico.

Scarcely had he met X than his Mexican visa expired and he returned to the US via Cuba. It became impossible for him to continue living in Mount Holyoke: the long winter months, the lack of sun, the snow all served to depress him. On his return from vacation in 1952, he resigned from his post, giving up a worthy position, a decent salary, and life in a friendly and welcoming country that offered him a comfortable and convenient lifestyle. He had always had a restless temperament, a desire to travel to new places. Only love had the power to overcome this need and make him feel at home in a place, to overcome his sense of isolation. In this, there is perhaps a clue as to one of the reasons that he was attracted to the surrealists - the belief in the overwhelming power of love. In addition, he always had a powerful attraction to beautiful young men. He also had a constant urge to go against the grain of any society in which he found himself. This helped him not to fall into provincial ways during his youth in Seville, whose inhabitants thought they were living at the centre of the world rather than in a provincial capital. It also helped to immunise him against the airs and graces of Madrid or any other place in which he lived.

In November 1952, he settled in Mexico with his old friends Concha Méndez and Altolaguirre(although since they had separated in 1944 and later divorced, Cernuda actually stayed with Concha). Between 1954 and 1960 he was a lecturer at the National Autonomous University of Mexico. In 1958, the third edition of La realidad y el deseo was published in Mexico. For this edition Cernuda wrote an essay Historial de un libro which considers his work in order to see not so much how I made my poems but rather, as Goethe said, how they made me. In 1958, Altolaguirre died and Cernuda took on the job of editing his poetry. His two sisters died in 1960.

In June 1960, he lectured at UCLA and became friendly with Carlos Otero, who was presenting a doctoral thesis on Cernuda's poetry that year. This stay seems to have revitalised Cernuda and, on his return to Mexico, he began to write poetry again. The poems he wrote in the autumn and winter of 1960-61 form the nucleus of his final collection, Desolación de la Quimera, which he completed in San Francisco a few months later. From August 1961 to June 1962, he gave courses at San Francisco State College. After a brief return to Mexico, he made his third and final visit to California in September 1962, where he was a visiting professor at UCLA until June 1963. He spent the summer of 1963 in Mexico and, although he had an invitation to lecture at the University of Southern California, he declined it in August, because of the need to undergo a medical in order to extend his visa. He died in Concha Mėndez's house of a heart attack on November 5, 1963. He was buried in the Panteón Jardín, in Mexico City. He never married and had no children.

== Poetry ==
Luis Cernuda was one of the most dedicated poets amongst the members of the Generation of 1927. Salinas, Guillén, Diego and Dámaso Alonso were as well known for their teaching activities and their critical writings as for their poetry. Altolaguirre and Prados are probably remembered more for their printing work than for their literary output. Alberti enjoyed fame for his political activism and Lorca was possibly as gifted in drama and music as he was in poetry. Cernuda drifted into university teaching simply as a way of earning a living and never held a prestigious post. Everything in his life was incidental to his work as a poet. His published criticism is valuable for the insights it gives into his development as a poet - he tends to discuss the authors and works that had most influence on his poetry and thinking. The development of his poetry from first to last is dictated by the development of his character and not by literary fashion - although his personal crisis, depicted in Un río, un amor, does coincide with the personal crises experienced by Alberti, Lorca and Aleixandre. The collective title he chose for his poetry, La realidad y el deseo, refers to the conflict that is its primary theme. He wrote:

Desire led me towards the reality that offered itself to my eyes as if only through possession of it might I be able to achieve certainty about my own life. But since I have only ever achieved a precarious grip on it, there comes the opposite tendency, that of hostility to the ironic attractiveness of reality...And so, in my view, the essence of the problem of poetry is the conflict between reality and desire, between appearance and truth, permitting us to achieve some glimpse of the complete image of the world that we do not know.

A significant stage of his development occurred in 1923-24, when he was doing military service. Every afternoon, along with the other recruits, he had to ride round the outskirts of Seville. One afternoon, he had an epiphanic experience as if he were seeing things for the first time. He also felt an uncontrollable need to describe this experience. This led to the writing of a whole series of poems which have not survived.

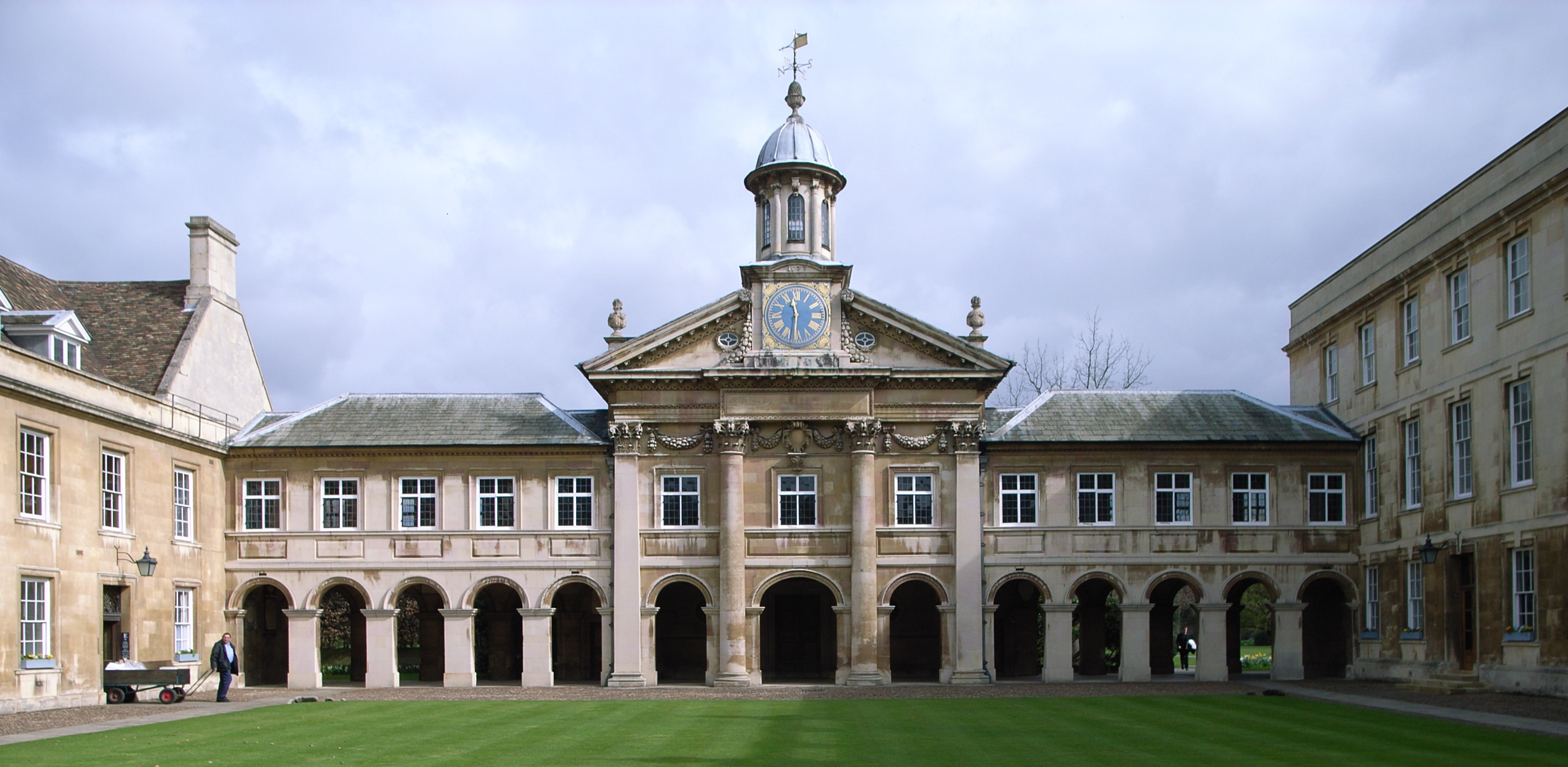
Emmanuel College, Cambridge

Another crucial phase of his development was his residence in Great Britain between 1938 and 1947. He learned English and read widely in English literature. He seems to have had a sense that he was predestined to read English poetry and that it corrected and completed something that was lacking both in his poetry and in himself. He began to see his work in the classroom as analogous to the writing of poetry - the poet should not simply try to communicate the effect of an experience but to direct the reader to retrace the process by which the poet had come to experience what he is writing about. His attitude to Britain was ambivalent. He learned a lot from the literature and greatly admired certain aspects of the national character, as displayed in wartime, but found it hard to summon up affection for the country and its people. He tried to sum up his ambivalent feelings in the poem "La partida", but he considered that he failed to do justice to the theme.

=== Collections ===
==== Primeras poesías (1924–1927) ====
This was the title that Cernuda gave in La realidad y el deseo to the revised version of his first published work Perfil del aire, which had been published by Litoral in April 1927. The collection was dedicated to Salinas, and Cernuda sent a copy to him in Madrid, where he was spending the university vacation. Cernuda later recalled that this book was greeted by a stream of hostile reviews that tended to concentrate on a perceived lack of novelty and on its indebtedness to Guillén. It also really stung him that Salinas merely sent back a brief acknowledgement of receipt of the book. He dealt with the apparent debt to Guillén in an open letter published in Ínsula in 1948, in which he points out that in 1927 Guillén had yet to publish a collection. During the 1920s, Guillén had published individual poems in various magazines - including 12 in two separate editions of the Revista de Occidente in 1924 and 1925 - but, he argues, this is scarcely sufficient evidence to demonstrate significant influence, given that in December 1925 he himself had had 9 poems published in Revista de Occidente. His conclusion is that both of them shared an interest in pure poetry and were influenced by the works of Mallarmé - in the case of Guillén this influence was transmitted via Valéry. Villena, writing in 1984, sees these poems as the result of the spread in the 1920s of the ideal of "pure poetry" as espoused by figures such as Valéry, Juan Ramón Jiménez, and Ortega y Gasset in his influential essay La deshumanización del arte. The young poets of the era, including Guillén, Aleixandre, Altolaguirre, Prados, Lorca and Cernuda, were all influenced by this blend of classical purity and refined playfulness and Guillén was the ring-leader. It was not so much a case of influence as a common, shared aesthetic. The reviews were not all hostile. José Bergamín, for example, published a favourable review and Guillén himself sent him a letter praising the work and urging him to ignore the reviews. Juan Guerrero Ruiz, the secretary of Juan Ramón Jiménez, also sent him a letter full of praise. Nevertheless, he was never able to forget the criticism that this work had engendered. He was too thin-skinned for that.

The revision process removed ten poems and also some of the stylistic elements that might have triggered comparisons to Guillén - such as the use of exclamations and the rhetorical device apostrophe - but in reality the poets are very different in tone. Guillén reaches out joyfully and confidently to reality whereas Cernuda is more hesitant - the world might be an exciting place but something holds him back. Like Guillén, Cernuda uses strict metrical forms in this collection, such as the décima and the sonnet, and there is also an intellectual quality far removed from the folkloric elements that were being used by poets such as Alberti and Lorca, but the emotional restraint is far removed from the world of Cántico. The change of title suggests a recent desire to strip artifice away from his poetry, presumably this refers to the reference in the title to the street where he had grown up - the Calle del Aire - which had baffled Francisco Ayala, one of the negative reviewers. There are already poems that reject the real world in favour of a love that will lead to oblivion. The poet wants to find a place to hide from the world of reality, fully aware that such a retreat or escape can only be temporary. The overriding mood is one of adolescent melancholy. The debt to Juan Ramón Jiménez is also strong.

==== Egloga, Elegía, Oda (1927–1928) ====
After the set-back of the critical reception of Perfil del aire, Cernuda decided to cultivate precisely those things that had been criticised, especially the lack of novelty. He wrote an eclogue, heavily influenced by his favourite Spanish poet Garcilaso. This was published in the first issue of a magazine called Carmen and was received very favourably by Salvador de Madariaga. This was followed by an elegy and then by an ode. Although he came to recognise that writing these poems had helped his technical fluency, he realised that there was something essential that these formal exercises did not allow him to express. However, he was encouraged to learn that it was possible to write poems of much greater length than was customary at that time, which was an important discovery for him. In Historial de un libro, he states that at this time he was trying to find an objective correlative for what he was experiencing - one of the many indications of the influence of TS Eliot on his work, although this is a rationalisation after the fact because he had yet to read Eliot.

This small group of poems can be read as Cernuda's participation in the Góngora tercentenary celebrations - except that he chose to evoke the memories of Garcilaso's eclogues and Luis de León's odes possibly as a way to signal his individuality and his independence from fashion. However, their influence is evident only on the form of these poems - the subject-matter is more obviously influenced by Mallarmé. The languorous mood recalls "L'après-midi d'un Faune". There are hints of the poet's admiration for Greek mythology and also of his interest in male physical beauty which would be developed in later collections. Luis de León was a lasting interest. His essay included in Poesía y literatura shows that Cernuda considered him to be a kindred spirit; someone for whom poetry was a refuge or means of escape from the trials and difficulties of everyday life; someone who was always trying to find a way to gain access to a realm of harmony.

==== Un río, un amor (1929) ====
Cernuda started work on this collection during his period in Toulouse. He visited Paris in the Easter vacation of 1929 and was bowled over by the museums and the book-stalls. He spent his days soaking up the sights. One day, back in Toulouse, he wrote "Remordimiento en traje de noche" and discovered a style that enabled him to express poetic needs that he had not been able to communicate up till then. He had not written any poetry since before his arrival in Toulouse in 1928 but he produced the first 3 poems of the new collection in quick succession. His dissatisfaction with the conventions of fashionable poetry had been freed by contact with surrealism. For Cernuda, surrealism was more than a literary phenomenon: it a was the expression of an attitude against conformity. The poems in this collection break with the concept of pure poetry. He retains the precision and elegance of his language but infuses it with more passion and intensity. He continued work on this collection after his return to Madrid.

The influence of the Surrealists is shown by the complexity of the free-flowing imagery, some of it inspired by random discoveries such as the title of a jazz record (as a jazz fan, he used to scour record catalogues and was intrigued by titles such as "I want to be alone in the South"), the name of an American city such as Durango or Daytona, a title card from a silent film, or an image from a talking picture such as White Shadows in the South Seas which he had seen in Paris. The metrical schemes and rhyme patterns of the first two collections are largely abandoned. This was the first collection in which he made use of what he calls free verse. In reality, this amounts to ignoring classical Spanish verse forms and rhyme schemes, such as letrillas - in fact, from this point on Cernuda rarely uses full rhyme or even assonance - even though he often felt a need to write in a lyrical style. A few of the poems in this book are written in alexandrine quatrains and most have some kind of metrical pattern, which makes them unusual in the context of the Surrealist movement. In a poem such as "¿Son todos felices?", Cernuda makes it clear what attracted him to the Surrealists, their protest against society and the pressure to conform. In this poem, honour, patriotism and duty are seen as worthless in comparison to the suffering they inflict on the rebel or non-conformist. Just being alive and living according to the rules is equivalent to being dead. It is noteworthy that this poem contains the first unequivocal expression of homoerotic attraction in his poetry. The collection, like its successor, remained unpublished until 1936, when they were gathered into the first edition of La realidad y el deseo.

==== Los placeres prohibidos (1931) ====
The poems gathered in this and the previous collection came to Cernuda fully formed. The poems that eventually got published were the same as the first drafts, which was very different from his experience with his first two collections. It is a book of love, rebellion and beauty.

The poet's homosexuality is made defiantly manifest in this collection. However, the title of the work suggests that there were other "forbidden pleasures" and he explores various ways of defying the norms of bourgeois behaviour. It is the product of an intensive period of literary production between April and June 1931, when Alfonso XIII abdicated and the Spanish Republic was proclaimed. In "Diré cómo nacisteis", Cernuda launches a war cry against a society in decay that represses and imprisons people who transgress the social norms of love. And in the next poem, "Telarañas cuelgan de la razón", he sets up the other major mood of the collection, an elegiac mood of sorrow. The poems in this book draw a distinction between the poet's freedom of imagination and the accepted rules of life that confine and limit his freedom. The predominant tone is one of desolation, recalling the transitory nature of love and the emptiness it leaves in its wake. In "De qué país", Cernuda looks at a newborn child and depicts the betrayal of his sense of wonder and innocence by the way the adult world imposes artificial codes of behaviour and a sense of guilt when the code is transgressed. It is a theme that is explored many times in his oeuvre.

==== Donde habite el olvido (1932–1933) ====
This book resulted from a love affair that ended badly. When the collection was first published, by the Signo publishing house, nobody noticed the significance of a large "S" in the form of a snake on the inside back cover. Derek Harris identified the other man as Serafín Fernández Ferro a young man from a poor family in La Coruña who led a picaresque life and insinuated himself into the artistic circles of Madrid in early 1931, aged 16. Biographical data for him is scanty, fragmented and often confusing. In 1945, he appeared in Malraux's film Espoir: Sierra de Teruel and then emigrated to Mexico, where he died in 1954. Cernuda probably met him in April 1931 and fell head over heels in love. This led to the flood of creativity that resulted in Los placeres prohibidos, the majority of which was written between April 13 and 30. The relationship quickly soured. Serafín was both promiscuous and bisexual, which led to jealousy on the part of Cernuda, he used to ask his lover for money and was generally manipulative. There were occasional violent rows between them. Some of the atmosphere of their relationship is described in "Aprendiendo olvido", one of the prose poems included in Ocnos. By June 1932, their relationship was finished.

In later years, Cernuda was embarrassed by the candour with which he wrote about it in Donde habite, attributing this to the slowness of his emotional development, and admitted that this section of his oeuvre was one of the least-satisfying for him.

In this collection, Cernuda steps away from surrealism, feeling that what was lying around hidden in the depths of his subconscious had been dredged sufficiently. Instead of what he had come to see as the artifice and triviality of hermetic images deriving from the flow of thoughts through the poet's mind, he turned to the example of the 19thc. poet Gustavo Adolfo Bécquer, who produced tightly controlled poetry on the subject of lost love. Cernuda continued to eschew rhyme and assonance but, like Bécquer's Rimas the stanzas are short and self-contained and their language is restrained. Sometimes, the poems return to the world of the Primeras poesías.

The first poem alludes obliquely to Serafín, the archangel who is named explicitly in a later poem "Mi arcángel". The leit-motiv of the angel recurs in "II" and in "XII", among others. In "III", the theme is the emptiness left by the passing of love - just as in "Telarañas cuelgan de la razón" from Los placeres prohibidos - but rendered in a much simpler, more lyrical fashion. "IV" shows how the dreams and aspirations of youth are destroyed when they soar too high - probably a reference to the myth of Icarus. "VII" returns to the enclosed world of the early poems, suggesting that despite all his experiences the poet is still an unfulfilled dreamer. "XII" suggests that love alone makes life real. It persists as a universal force even though it might have died in a particular individual. The ideas behind surrealism are still present, although the presentation of them is markedly different.

This love affair had a lasting effect on Cernuda. He alludes to it in "Apologia pro vita sua" in Como quien espera el alba and also in a short story written in 1937, right in the midst of the Civil War - "Sombras en el salón".

==== Invocaciones (1934–1935) ====
This collection was originally called Invocaciones a las gracias del mundo but Cernuda later shortened it to make it seem less pompous. Tired with the habitual brevity of poems in the tradition of Antonio Machado or Jiménez, he starts to write much longer poems than hitherto. When he started work on these poems, he realised that their subject-matter needed greater length for him to be able to express everything he needed to say about them. He cast off all the remaining traces of "pure" poetry. He also notes, however, that there is a tendency to ramble at the beginning of certain poems in this book as well as a degree of bombast.

His principal subject-matter is still essentially himself and his thoughts but he starts to view things in a more objective way: the poetry is more analytical. For example, in "Soliloquio del farero", the poet finds an escape from desperation in an enclosed and solitary world very similar to that of his earliest poems. The poem is addressed to his "friend" - solitude - and he develops the idea that he has been chosen to serve mankind in some way by being separated from them, just like a lighthouse-keeper. Other poems in the collection allude to Greek mythology or a golden age of innocence that has been lost. Early in 1935, at the height of his relationship with Stanley Richardson, Cernuda dedicated "Por unos tulipanes amarillos" to him.

==== Las nubes (1937–1940) ====
This collection was written during the Spanish Civil War and amidst all the disruption and uncertainty in Cernuda's life as he went into exile, drifting from Madrid, to London, to Paris, to Cranleigh and finally to Glasgow. It is a book about war and exile and how both of these connect with Spain. It is his most Spanish collection a nd a pivotal collection in his output. Meditations about his isolation in foreign countries and about Spain, particularly about his growing feeling that nothing in Spain was going to change for the better and that intolerance, ignorance and superstition were winning the struggle, are the major themes. There is a dichotomy in the way he views Spain. On the one hand is Spain the stepmother of whom he is ashamed, stuck in the past, jealous, intolerant, violent and now wrecked by war, as depicted in "Elegía española I". On the other hand is an idealised version of Spain, now destroyed, to which Cernuda feels allegiance. It is a mix of a lost Eden of the south (the Spain of his Andalusian background), a tolerant, creative, great and respected nation and of the most positive and creative aspects of Golden Age Spain. This Spain is depicted in "El ruiseñor sobre la piedra", "Elegía española II" and other poems. Exile is a theme that Cernuda will keep developing for the rest of his poetic career. Physical exile reminds the poet that he is also a spiritual exile in the world, a cursed figure because every poet belongs to a purer realm of experience, as he had already started to write about in Invocaciones. "Scherzo para un elfo" and "Gaviotas en el parque" are just two of the explorations of this theme

Stylistically, there is an increased concentration on clarity and simplicity of diction and his control over his means of expression is growing. He often uses combinations of 7 and 11 syllable lines, the basic form of the silva, a very important form for poets of both the Spanish Golden Age and the Generation of 1898. The collections prior to 'Las Nubes' were intimate and abstract. In Invocaciones he adds symbolic elements but now his poetry takes on greater amplitude with the addition of reflections on culture, mythology, history and his biography. He starts to write dramatic monologues and to work towards a more conversational style of poetry, under the influences of Wordsworth and Browning.

When he left Madrid in February 1938, he took eight new poems with him. In London, he wrote six more. He wrote "Lázaro" while Chamberlain and Hitler were negotiating over Czechoslovakia, and the poem is written in a mood of melancholy calm, trying to express the disenchanted surprise that a dead man might feel on being brought back to life. Cernuda was feeling a growing sense of detachment and this is one of the first examples of his characteristic use of a Doppelgänger to express, in this case, his sense of alienation and lifelessness.

During his stay with the colony of evacuated Basque children at Eaton Hastings, he befriended a boy called Iñaki who had quickly mastered English and showed such promise that Lord Faringdon was prepared to finance his education at a private school - an offer refused by the boy on political grounds, according to the story told by Cernuda to his fellow émigré Rafael Martínez Nadal. Shortly afterwards, the boy fell ill and was taken to the Radcliffe Infirmary. On March 27, he was close to death. He refused the last sacraments and turned away from the crucifix held out by a priest. He wanted to see Cernuda, however, and asked him to read a poem. He then turned to the wall and died. This was the inspiration for the poem "Niño muerto", written in May 1938.

A key poem in the collection is "A Larra, con unas violetas (1837-1937)", in which he identifies himself with Mariano José de Larra, the brilliant, satirical journalist of 19thc. Madrid. Larra was a fierce critic of the governments of his day and of the state of Spanish society but was at heart very patriotic. Cernuda sees in Larra a kindred spirit, embittered, misunderstood, isolated and unsuccessful in love.

==== Como quien espera el alba (1941–1944) ====
This work was begun during his 1941 vacation in Oxford, continued in Glasgow and completed at Cambridge in 1944. The autumn, winter and spring of 1941-2 was one of the most fertile periods of his life and it seems that this collection was one of his favourites. He read widely in English poetry and criticism and made acquaintance with the writings of TS Eliot, Dr Johnson, Coleridge, Matthew Arnold and Keats's letters amongst others. He also began to read Goethe and Kierkegaard. Whilst this extensive reading does not show through specifically in any poem, his handling of longer poems is more assured. There are poems that suggest a nostalgia for the Seville of his youth - not an emotion that Cernuda often displays, but a longing for bright sunshine and warmth is easily explicable in the circumstances. It is only in such indirect ways that a reader can sense what was happening around him. Glasgow was bombed 5 times by the Luftwaffe in the Blitz and suffered extensive damage but it would be impossible to gather this from reading Cernuda. However, this collection does include "Por otros tulipanes amarillos" an elegy to his former lover Stanley Richardson dead in an air raid on London, which echoes an earlier tribute published in Invocaciones.

In an extended poem, "Noche del hombre y su demonio", he reflects on the course of his life and the possibility of being remembered after his death. The demonio attacks the concept of the poet's vocation and suggests that Cernuda might sometimes have been tempted to try to live a normal life. However, the poet fights back by saying that his poetic vocation is what justifies his life and gives it whatever meaning it might have. Even though he might be wrong or suffering from a delusion, his poetry is absolutely necessary to him and he must commit to it totally.

"Góngora" is another poem that takes a historical figure and projects the poet's own psychological state onto him. The poem seems to be a development from a set of notes he made in 1937 and collected under the title Góngora y el gongorismo. He sees Góngora as a victim of society and surveys the humiliation and incomprehension from which he suffered when alive, the lack of respect accorded to him by critics and his eventual rehabilitation from neglect in 1927. In these notes, he briefly discusses a recently published work on Góngora by Dámaso Alonso, which discusses the two types of poetry that Góngora wrote - complex and elaborate works such as "Polifemo" or the "Soledades" as against artless ballads and sonnets. In Cernuda's view, however, there is only one poet and the critic ought to try to resolve these two opposing tendencies and demonstrate them as aspects of a single truth. It is characteristic of Cernuda to resist the way society tries to appropriate and sanitise the poet, while showing disdain to him while he was alive. He expresses this resistance with great power and bitter irony in the poem

Ventaja grande es que esté ya muerto
Y que de muerto cumpla los tres siglos, que así pueden
Los descendientes mismos de quienes le insultaban
Inclinarse a su nombre, dar premio al erudito,
Sucesor del gusano, royendo su memoria.

(it is a great advantage that he is now dead and that he lasted three centuries dead, for now the very descendants of those who insulted him may bow to his name, give a prize to the scholar, successor to the worm, gnawing away at his memory)

The title of the collection alludes to the atmosphere of Britain during the Second World War when "it was only possible to hope for an end to the world's retreat into a primitive world of darkness and terror, in the middle of which England was like the ark in which Noah survived the flood."

==== Vivir sin estar viviendo (1944–1949) ====
Begun in Cambridge, continued in London and completed in America, this is very similar to the previous collection in that it contains a mix of introspective and self-analytical works and shorter impressionist poems. As a result of his reading of Hölderlin, Cernuda had started to use enjambement. His increasing use of this device gave his poetry a duality of rhythm - the rhythm of the individual line and the rhythm of the phrase. Since he tended not to use rhyme or even assonance and was not very interested in writing poetry with a marked metrical pattern, the rhythm of the line tends to be swamped by that of the phrase, resulting in an effect that is often close to prose. It is a rhythm of ideas rather than a metrical rhythm. And yet, the influence of Hölderlin dates back to the period when he was writing Invocaciones in the mid-1930s, which gives a sense of how profound the influence was. The German poet gave him an example of "a poetic language using long sense periods in extensive poems that develop a theme in depth" and over time the reader can see Cernuda absorbing and building on this example.

The first eight poems were written in Cambridge and he added another 13 which he wrote during holidays in Cornwall. The title alludes to the state of mind in which he found himself at that time - living vicariously in foreign countries where he scarcely knew anybody. His voracious reading was taking the place of living. He could see nothing ahead of him but death. A typical poem from this collection is "El César", which is another use of the Doppelgänger motif. The aged Emperor Tiberius in retirement in his palace on Capri ponders his solitude and voluntary separation from the world and people. His feeling of misanthropy is almost idealised. He reflects on his power, his age, the blood he has shed, the rumours that circulate about him, his regrets and guilty feelings, what it is like to be an old man desirous of youthful flesh. It is a complex poem: Caesar is a projection of Cernuda's thoughts and yet he is also a figure in his own right, reflecting on his own life story.

==== Con las horas contadas (1950–1956) ====
This collection was started in Mount Holyoke during the winter of 1950 and completed in Mexico. One of the most noteworthy things about this book is that it contains a group of 16 poems - "Poemas para un cuerpo" - about an intensely physical affair he had with an unidentified man in Mexico. The title of the collection suggests not merely Cernuda's obsession with the passing of time but also the sense of strangeness he felt whilst living this amorous adventure - an old man in love as he describes himself. As already stated, this was one of the happiest periods in his life. Some of the poems refer to the experiences he felt during the affair but the majority are reflections after the affair ended, attempts to explain and fix this experience of intense love. There are obvious parallels with Donde habite el olvido but these later poems are not bitter, resentful or disillusioned. Cernuda "is primarily concerned to investigate the relationship between himself and the experience of love, so much so in fact that the loved one has only a secondary importance in the poems". However, he is, unlike Serafín Fernández Ferro or Stanley Richardson, present in the poems rather than a shadow or absence. The poems lack sensuality. Poem "IV Sombra de mí", for example, "is a meditation on the relationship between the lover and the beloved. The loved one is again the visible image of the lover's desire but nonetheless necessary for without him love could not have been exteriorised." What we get is a sense of the poet's gratitude for having been given the chance to experience love. It is interesting that although Cernuda later expressed his affection for these poems he acknowledges that they give cause to one of the most serious objections that can be made to his work: that he was not always able to maintain the distance between the man who suffers and the poet who creates.

The bulk of the poems in the collection are shorter than in previous books and start to incorporate assonance more frequently in an attempt to concentrate the thematic material rather than explore it at length and also to seem more purely lyrical, even though these urges were not the result of a conscious decision.

Among the other interesting poems is the one that opens the collection, "Aguila y rosa", a very sober, restrained account of the unfortunate marriage of Philip II and Mary Tudor, and Philip's stay in Britain. At times, it could be that Cernuda is projecting his own feelings onto the king. Brief and ultimately tragic as their married life was, at least the love she experienced gave Mary some recompense for her unhappy life. With this poem, Cernuda completed a trilogy of works about Philip II. The first was "El ruiseñor sobre la piedra" in Las nubes, followed by "Silla del rey" from Vivir sin estar viviendo. Both of these poems evoke the building of the monastery-palace at El Escorial. In the first poem, the monastery becomes a symbol of the visionary, idealist, eternal Spain that Cernuda loved. It is an image of beauty, the creation of a sensibility that despises the practical and is diametrically opposed to the utilitarian environment of Glasgow, the place where he lives in exile. The nightingale singing its song, just to please itself, is a symbol for Cernuda the poet and it becomes fused with his conception of El Escorial. "Silla del rey" depicts Philip watching the construction of his palace from his seat in the hills above. Cernuda takes as a starting point the king's thoughts of the building as the expression of his faith and centralising political ideas. This develops into a reflection on his work, time and society and leads to a declaration that he is creating a haven from the world, protected by spiritual power from temporal change. Reality and desire have become one. The king is an outlet for Cernuda himself.

"El elegido" is an objective account of the choosing, preparation and killing of an Aztec sacrificial victim. It is recounted in very simple language but it clearly picks up on the thoughts behind the soliloquy in Invocaciones. The poem presents an allegory of the choosing, beguilement and final destruction of the poet by life or the "daimonic" power.

==== Desolación de la Quimera (1956–1962) ====
Cernuda's last book of poems is a summing up of his career. It was published in Mexico in November 1962. It mingles poems in the style of his first book with epigrammatic works and extended reveries in his mature style. In "Niño tras un cristal", he completes a cycle of poems about the unawareness and hope of a child before its corruption by the world - a theme present right from the start of his poetic career. In addition there are poems that are derived from song-titles or catch-phrases - "Otra vez, con sentimiento" - and historical poems about figures such as Mozart, Verlaine and Rimbaud, Keats, Goethe, Ludwig of Bavaria. There is also a poem about a painting by Titian,"Ninfa y pastor, por Ticiano". It is as if Cernuda has a need to base his experiences of life on a foundation of cultural references. Stylistically, this is an extreme collection. There no lyrical flights, no expansive metaphors. However, in the view of Luis Antonio de Villena, this dry language is exactly right for these ironic, cutting but perfectly chiselled poems.

It is clear that he knew that his life was coming to a close and he wanted to settle his accounts. This is shown by the titles of poems such as "Antes de irse", "Dos de noviembre", "Del otro lado", "Epílogo" and "Despedida". There are direct links to previous collections. For example, "Epílogo" is explicitly related to the "Poemas para un cuerpo", and "Pregunta vieja, vieja respuesta" links back to Donde habite el olvido.

He also returns to the theme of Spain, which had first appeared in Las nubes, analysing what he admires and dislikes. In "Díptico español", he shows his contempt for the intolerance, stupidity and cruelty of the Spanish society of his era. He is a Spaniard despite himself: he has no choice in the matter. However, he is proud of Spanish culture as exemplified by the works of Benito Pérez Galdós and Miguel de Cervantes: he is nostalgic not so much for the reality of Spain as for the idealised world created by Spanish literature. There are poems about other poets he knew, sometimes splenetic in tone. As usual, the major theme is that of the impossibility of finding happiness in a world where desire and reality diverge - cf "Hablando a Manona", "Luna llena en Semana Santa", or "Música cautiva". However, he does find some kind of consolation in the realm of art - listening to Mozart's music, or considering the world of Goethe compared with that of Napoleon's drunken soldiers. Also, by this time, he had gathered some degree of fame in Spain and there were signs that people were responding to his writings. In "Peregrino", he reacts to enquiries about whether he might return to his homeland in a characteristically grumpy way which shades into a tone of resolute stoicism as he explains that he is driven to keep moving forward and can never return to the past.

=== Influences ===
It was at the urging of Pedro Salinas that Cernuda began to read classical Spanish poets such as Garcilaso, Luis de León, Góngora, Lope de Vega, Quevedo and Calderón de la Barca. He also urged him to learn French and to read modern French literature, in particular André Gide and the poetry of Baudelaire, Mallarmé and Rimbaud. Cernuda also became acquainted with the poetry of Pierre Reverdy and counts him as a major influence over the poems in his first collection, Perfil del aire, for his qualities of spareness, purity and reticence. No contemporary critic recognised this influence. In Un río, un amor, "Destierro" echoes Reverdy's poetry in its evocation of a solitary existence in a hostile urban world. He also read Lautréamont's Les Chants de Maldoror and Préface a un livre futur, although their influence emerged at a later time when Cernuda began to explore the French Surrealist movement.

Just before he completed Perfil del aire, in March 1926, the Madrid book-seller León Sánchez Cuesta had already delivered to him a copy of Le Libertinage by Louis Aragon. In the time just after the publication of Perfil del aire, he began to read other books by the leaders of the Surrealist movement - André Breton, Paul Eluard, Louis Aragon and René Crevel. He strongly identified with their boldness and their sense of alienation from their society and this emerges clearly in his third and fourth collections.

While he was halfway through writing the poems of Invocaciones, he began to read Hölderlin, which he describes as one of his greatest experiences in poetry. He had grown tired of the very restricted range of literature championed by the French surrealists and was starting to interest himself in English and German poetry. In order to read them, he began to learn these languages. He was enthralled by the depth and poetic beauty that he discovered in Hölderlin and discovered not just a new vision of the world but also a new means of poetic expression. In a note that he wrote to accompany some translations of Hölderlin, Cernuda describes him as imbued with the force of pagan myths, "a living echo of pagan forces now buried". He thinks that Hölderlin's metaphysical lyricism is closer to Keats rather than Blake "although at times, in his fragments which have such dark transcendence, he is not so far from the prophetic songs of the latter." There is a strong sense of Cernuda identifying himself with Hölderlin as he describes his alienation from the world he lived in. For him, "the secret forces of earth are the only realities, far from the conventions that govern society." He also notes an occasion in which the poet was discovered one day in rapture at the feet of some Classical statues in a Paris park. In Invocaciones there are two poems that explicitly invoke ancient Greek gods and they seem to link closely to this reference. In "Himno a la tristeza", sadness is seen as something gifted by the gods to mankind, as in Hölderlin's "Die Heimat" and, more directly, in "A las estatuas de los dioses", Cernuda portrays how "although forgotten and humiliated in an alien, degraded world, the gods still represent an age of joy, innocence, and harmony, when love was still possible." For Cernuda, Hölderlin is as much a kindred spirit as an influence: they share a pantheistic vision of Nature, a sense of tragic destiny (the poder daimónico described by Cernuda in many poems and essays), the same conviction that society was hostile to the Poet, the same nostalgia for a lost Golden Age of harmony. Before he even read Hölderlin, these themes emerge in the "Egloga", the "Oda", and "De qué país" from Los placeres prohibidos.

During his stay in Paris in 1936, he bought a copy of the Greek Anthology in a French translation. He was stimulated by the concise and penetrating style of these poems and epigrams.

After his move to Great Britain in September 1938, Cernuda continued the exploration of English literature that he had begun the previous spring. While he was reading Eliot, Blake, Keats, Shakespeare's plays, he was struck by their lack of verbal ornamentation compared with Spanish and French poetry. He discovered that a poet could achieve a deeper poetic effect by not shouting or declaiming, or repeating himself, by avoiding bombast and grandiloquence. As in those epigrams in the Greek anthology, he admired the way that concision could give a precise shape to a poem. He learned to avoid two literary vices, the pathetic fallacy and "purple patches", avoiding undue subjectivity or features that did not fit in with the overall conception of the poem. The tendencies had been there, to gradually increasing extent, in his poetry from the outset but his reading confirmed him on this route. He also read Browning and learned how to take a dramatic, historic or legendary situation and to project his own emotional state onto it, in order to achieve greater objectivity, as in poems such as "Lázaro", "Quetzalcóatl", "Silla del Rey", or "El César".

In a study of Cernuda's influences, E.M. Wilson suggests that, soon after his arrival in England, he began to emulate the way that T.S. Eliot borrows and alludes to works by other writers. He provides examples of such possible borrowings from Rodrigo Caro, Baudelaire, Luis de León and Quevedo. He also suggests that Lope de Vega and George Herbert were the sources for another 2 poems, "Divertimento" and "La poesía". Eliot's influence is also suggested in an essay by Octavio Paz - "La palabra edificante". One significant borrowing from Eliot is the title of his last collection of poetry, Desolación de la Quimera, which alludes to a line from "Burnt Norton"

The loud lament of the disconsolate chimera

in itself an allusion to a sermon by John Donne.

At Mount Holyoke he started to read Die Fragmente der Vorsokratiker (The Fragments of the Presocratics) by Hermann Diels with the help of an English translation. In Mexico, he read John Burnet's Early Greek Philosophy. These fragments of pre-Socratic thought seemed to him the most profound and poetic philosophical works he had ever read. The world of ancient Greece is often recalled in his poetry. It reminded him of his childhood reading of a book of Greek mythology which, even at that early age, had been sufficient to make his religious beliefs seem sad and depressing. He tried to express something of that experience in "El poeta y los mitos" in Ocnos.

=== Poetics: the role of the poet and poetry ===
Cernuda's poetry shows a continual process of stripping away artifice and fashionable stylistic traits or mannerisms. This accounts in part for the abrupt changes in style and tone between various collections. He was also convinced that a poet needs to gain as much variety of experience and knowledge as possible, otherwise his work will be pallid and restricted. A poet's work should reflect his growth, his intellectual and emotional development.

When he describes things, it is his individual perception of them that he is trying to convey, what they mean to him, rather than their objective existence. However, after his early collections, he rarely uses the first-person. He frequently tries to create a sense of distance from his poetry by using the "tú" form but the person he is addressing is usually himself. The effect of this is that much of his poetry seems to be a self-conscious interior monologue. In part, this is because he was always conscious of a difference between the Cernuda who lived and suffered and the Cernuda who wrote poetry. In part, it is also probably a result of his natural reticence and caution against disclosing too much of himself, despite the fact that personal history lies behind much of his output. Whereas Browning might use a figure such as Fra Lippo Lippi or Andrea del Sarto to live imaginatively what he would not present as his own experience, Cernuda's characters have Cernuda's voice and present versions or aspects of his own thoughts and feelings.

He was convinced that he was driven by an inner daimon to write poetry and that the poet is in touch with a spiritual dimension of life that normal people are either blind to or shut off from. it is a topic which he alludes to frequently in his critical writings. His urge to write poetry was not under his control. Reading some lines of poetry, hearing some notes of music, seeing an attractive person could be the external influence that led to a poem but what was important was to try to express the real, deep-lying poetic impulse, which was sometimes powerful enough to make him shiver or burst into tears.

Although he was a self-absorbed person, dedicated to the art of writing poetry, he was vulnerable enough to need to know that he had an audience. After November 1947, when an edition of Como quien espera el alba was published in Buenos Aires, rumours of its favourable reception reached him in Mount Holyoke. He was gratified to learn that he was starting to find an audience and that his name was getting mentioned when Spanish poetry was discussed.

== Translations ==
During the writing of Invocaciones, he met the German philosopher and linguist Hans Gebser, who was living and working in Madrid in the Ministry of Education. This was at a time when Cernuda was beginning to become enthused by the poetry of Hölderlin and, with Gebser's help he began to translate selected poems. These appeared in Cruz y Raya in early 1936. Because his knowledge of German was rudimentary, he made an error in translating the final line of one of the poems. A second edition was published in Mexico in 1942 but, since Bergamín did not advise him of this and Cernuda himself was living in Scotland at the time, he was unable to correct this and other infelicities. Gebser himself, together with Roy Hewin Winstone, was compiling an anthology of contemporary Spanish poetry translated into German and Cernuda tried to get him to exclude any poems by Guillén, Salinas or Dámaso Alonso, on the basis that they were teachers rather than poets. He only succeeded in getting Alonso excluded and the anthology was published in Berlin in 1936.

In addition, he translated a set of 6 poems by Eluard, published in Litoral in 1929. In 1938, with the collaboration of Stanley Richardson, he translated 2 sonnets by Wordsworth which were published in Hora de España. He also translated poems by Blake, Yeats and Keats, which were published in Romance in 1940. Three poems by Yeats, Browning and Marvell were included in the first volume of Poesía y literatura.

== Works in prose ==
=== Prose poems ===
==== Ocnos (1940–1956) ====
Cernuda did not enjoy his life in Glasgow. He felt exiled both from happiness and love and began to feel a yearning for his childhood days. He remembered the South as a lost paradise. It was in 1940 that the contrasts between the sordid and ugly city of Glasgow where he was living and his childhood memories of Seville inspired him to start to write brief prose poems to try to exorcise the tensions building up inside him. As the collection built up, he cast about for a title, finally finding one that pleased him in a work by Goethe. Ocnos was a mythical Roman figure who twisted reeds into ropes only to discover that his donkey methodically ate them. Yet he persisted in his efforts in order to give himself something to do and perhaps learn something. It struck Cernuda that there was a fitting irony - the creator continually trying to create and the donkey symbolising time the destroyer, standing in the place of the reading public, an unwittingly destructive consumer. The first edition was published in London in 1942 and consisted of 31 pieces. Cernuda continued mining the seam of work that writing prose poetry opened up for him and brought out a second edition in Madrid in 1949, with 48 pieces. The first edition had focused solely on Cernuda's childhood and adolescence in Seville. In the second edition, he gave the pieces a biographical sequence and moved beyond his life in Seville. The final edition had 63 pieces and was published in Mexico in 1963.

The first group of poems overlapped with the writing of Como quien espera el alba and this was obviously one of those periods of inspired creativity, such as when he was writing "Un río, un amor" and Los placeres prohibidos. Exploration of his formative years was becoming a major preoccupation and there are overlaps between his poems and prose poems. The clearest example is "Jardín antiguo", which is both the title of a poem in Las nubes and a prose poem in Ocnos. Both are inspired by the gardens of the Alcázar of Seville. In the poem, an ageing man dreams of returning to the walled garden, with its fountain, lemon trees, magnolias and birdsong. He dreams of the return of youth with its pangs of desire, knowing full well that they will not come back. In Ocnos we get a more expansive description of the garden and at the same time a deeper reflection on his connection to that place, the sense of rapture that he felt as a boy there. It concludes with a statement of the gap between reality and desire:

Más tarde habías de comprender que ni la acción ni el goce podrías vivirlos con la perfección que tenían en tus sueños al borde de la fuente. Y el día que comprendiste esa triste verdad, aunque estabas lejos y en tierra extraña, deseaste volver a aquel jardín y sentarte de nuevo al borde de la fuente, para soñar otra vez la juventud pasada. (Later you had to understand that neither action nor enjoyment could be lived with the perfection they had in your dreams at the edge of the fountain. And the day you understood that sad truth, even though you were far away and in a strange land, you wished to return to that garden and sit again on the edge of the fountain, to dream again of past youth.)

John Taylor writes,"As [Cernuda] recalls loci of ephemeral harmony, increases his knowledge and self-knowledge, and crafts his ruminations, he hints that these introspective and poetic labours are all in vain. The donkey is already chewing the beautiful reed-woven rope."

While the predominant mood of the collection is sad, imbued with a sense of loss and nostalgia, there is also room for the occasional celebration as in "El estío" and "El amante", where he recalls the sensual delights of a holiday in Málaga in 1933, frolicking on the beach and in the sea, walking naked under his white robe with his friends and, in particular, his lover Gerardo Carmona. Apart from the short-lived affairs with Serafín Fernández Ferro and Stanley Richardson, Carmona is the only other person we know about with whom Cernuda had a lasting affair in the 1930s. Again, these prose poems share an affinity of mood and subject-matter with a poem written around the same time, "Elegía anticipada", included in Como quien espera el alba, in which he declares that their love has broken out of the prisons of time.

When his thoughts turn to Glasgow, in "Ciudad caledonia", he describes his hatred of the place, its monotony, vulgarity and ugliness and his dislike of the utilitarian, puritanical people. It was like a prison, useless in his life apart from work, parching and consuming what youthfulness he had left. One prose poem, "Escrito en el agua" (Written in the water), was excluded from the second edition of Ocnos by the censors in Franco's Spain - presumably because it contains blasphemous ideas - "God does not exist." He had the reputation of holding Communist views, of being anti-Franco, of living a lifestyle and holding views repugnant to the regime - a homosexual who was anti-religion and anti-family values, so his writings were always likely to come under close scrutiny from the censors. Cernuda himself decided not to include it in the third edition. Taylor points out that the title is a translation of Keats's epitaph, "Here Lies One Whose Name was Writ in Water". Cernuda had come to think it was too rhetorical in tone. It is another account of the destructiveness of time and how reality destroys all hopes and dreams. There is also an extended meditation in "El acorde" on his conception of cosmic harmony, a unity of feeling and consciousness that comes fleetingly, a moment of ecstasy. He calls it by the German word Gemüt and writes that the closest thing to it is "entering another body in the act of love [and thereby obtaining] oneness with life by way of the lover's body."

==== Variaciones sobre tema mexicano (1950) ====
The first piece in this book is called "La lengua". Since his departure from Spain in February 1938, although he had been in contact with many Hispanic people, he had missed the sense of being surrounded by his native language. His visit to Mexico in the summer of 1949, the feeling of being in a Hispanic culture, the temperament of the people, the hot sun all seem to have kick-started his inspiration. These prose poems and his next collection of poetry, Con las horas contadas, are the result. He wrote these pieces in the course of 1950, once he was back at Mount Holyoke, and the collection was published in 1952. He sets the general theme in an introduction by discussing the lack of interest in Mexico shown by writers from peninsular Spain. As a child, he had no curiosity about the country. His curiosity was sparked by chance after his arrival in America. Curiosity turned into interest, which developed into love and this love is explored in these pieces. This is one of the sunniest, in all senses, of Cernuda's collections. Gone is the sad introspection of Ocnos. In "Miravalle", he is enchanted by the viceroy's palace. If he were allowed to stay, he cannot imagine that he could tire of it or want to move elsewhere. In "Lo nuestro", the sight of native children begging reminds him of his homeland. His initial impulse is to return to the USA but, on further reflection, he comes to realise that this country is alive, in spite of its poverty. He reflects that perhaps poverty is the price you pay for being so alive. The USA seems vacuous and trivial in comparison. In "El mirador, he describes how the landscape, so similar to Spain, is taking control of him, exerting a spell over him, like it must have done over the conquistadors. "Perdiendo el tiempo" depicts a scene of indolent sensuality. "Ocio" is a reflection on the necessity of idleness. In "El patio", he feels as if he is back in the Seville of his childhood. He has finally managed to recover it. In "La posesión", he describes his urge to fuse with the land. In "Centro del hombre", he observes that the feeling of being a stranger, which had been a constant in his years of exile, has gone. He had been living with his body in one place and his soul in another. Now they are reunited:

con todo o con casi todo concordabas, y las cosas, aire, luz, paisaje, criaturas, te eran amigas. (you agreed with everything or almost everything, and things, air, light, landscape, creatures, were friends with you.)

However, these moments of harmony and union can only be fleeting - perfect shimmering moments, each of which is like a pearl between its two valves. On the plane back to the USA, he had to hide his tears and keep his feelings private. He then comments that this would add to the legend that has been created of his being dry and cold-hearted.

=== Short stories and drama ===
He published a set of three short stories - Tres narraciones - in Buenos Aires, 1948. The stories are:

- "El Viento en la Colina", originally written in 1938,
- "El Indolente", originally written in 1929,
- "El Sarao", originally written in 1941-42.

Two more stories appeared in Hora de España, "En la costa de Santiniebla" (1937) and "Sombras en el salón" (1937). The latter depicts the atmosphere of Carlos Morla's tertulias in which "not only literary and aesthetic questions were debated but quarrels and affairs of the heart: love, disillusion, dislikes..." It seems to be a fictionalised account of the breakdown of Cernuda's affair with Serafín Ferro.

He completed one play - La familia interrumpida - in two acts in 1937-38. It was published posthumously in 1988. Before that, in 1931, he wrote 9 pages of an untitled play that he never completed.

During his time in London, probably 1946, he began to translate Shakespeare's Troilus and Cressida into Spanish verse. This was a task that taught him a lot and which gave him a great deal of satisfaction. He acknowledged the advice given by E.M.Wilson, especially his help in clarifying difficult passages. Wilson was an eminent British scholar of Spanish Golden Age theatre who was at that time Professor of Spanish Literature at King's College, London. They had met in Madrid in 1930-31, when Wilson was on a scholarship at the Residencia de Estudiantes. Cernuda finished his translation in 1950 when he was at Mount Holyoke. With sponsorship from the British Council, it was published in Ínsula in 1953.

He also translated part of the first act of Romeo and Juliet.

=== Criticism ===
Cernuda wrote critical essays throughout his career, many of which were published in newspapers or magazines. Towards the end of his life, however, he brought out 4 collections of his most important pieces.

The first was Estudios sobre poesía española contemporánea (Madrid 1957). The conception of this work probably dates back to the 1940s but he only began work on the articles that comprise it in 1954. Cernuda gives a survey of what seem to him to be the most important currents in Spanish poetry from the 19th century onwards. He deliberately omits any neo-Classical or Romantic poets and starts with Ramón de Campoamor. He also covers Bécquer and Rosalía de Castro before moving on to a general essay on "Modernismo and the Generation of 1898". This is followed by individual essays on Miguel de Unamuno, Machado and Juan Ramón Jiménez. He then moves on to León Felipe, José Moreno Villa and Gómez de la Serna before focusing on his contemporaries, Salinas, Guillėn, Lorca, Diego, Alberti, Aleixandre and Altolaguirre. He ends the collection with some thoughts on developments since 1936. These articles were first published in a magazine called México en la Cultura between 1954 and 1956. The subsequent publication of the collected articles was delayed by the uproar that some of them had provoked, especially the essays on Juan Ramón Jiménez, Salinas and Guillén. It was eventually published in 1957 in a heavily bowdlerised version that omitted chapters relating to Guillén, Aleixandre, Altolaguirre, Diego and Alberti.

His next collection was Pensamiento poético en la lírica inglesa (Mexico 1958). Luis Maristany suggests that it is more interesting as an indication of Cernuda's interests than as a work of criticism in its own right, given that it was written up in Mexico from his notes at a time when he lacked access to a proper English language library and so could not properly develop his arguments. Yet, his audience was attracted by the novelty of a study of English poetry, written by a Spaniard. In a letter to Derek Harris, dated March 3, 1961, Cernuda states that "English literature, from my arrival in England (1938) until now, has been part of my daily reading." In his essay on Aleixandre, collected in the Estudios sobre poesía española contemporánea, he writes of his fascination with the tradition of poet-critics in English literature, comparing unfavourably the writings of such people as Sainte-Beuve and Menéndez y Pelayo with Coleridge, Keats, Arnold and Eliot. He was particularly inspired by his reading of essays by Eliot such as "The Frontiers of Criticism" and "Tradition and the Individual Talent". The collection shows just how extensive and deep his reading of English literature was, as it contains studies of Blake, Wordsworth, Coleridge, Shelley, Keats, Tennyson, Browning, Arnold, Swinburne and Hopkins.

Poesía y literatura, I y II (Barcelona 1960, 1964) These collections gathered together his most important essays or articles on literary themes. They display the extraordinary range of his reading, covering authors as diverse as Galdós, Goethe, Hölderlin, Cervantes, Marvell, Browning, Yeats, Gide, Rilke, Ronald Firbank, Nerval, Dashiell Hammett, Reverdy, Valle-Inclán as well as figures more often found in his writings such as Eliot and Juan Ramón Jiménez. The dates of composition of the essays range from 1935 to 1963, so they cover the full range of his critical career. For students of Cernuda, the main interest lies in the first volume. Not only does it contain his heartfelt 1946 tribute to Andrė Gide but also "Palabras antes de una Lectura" and "Historial de un Libro", two of the most revealing accounts of his poetics and starting-points for all Cernuda criticism. "Palabras" was the text of a lecture delivered at the Lyceum Club in Madrid in 1935 and edited for publication in 1941. He begins by discussing the purpose of poetry, which for him is a question of conveying his personal experience of the world. It is in this lecture that he reveals his primary theme: reality versus desire. His aim is to find "a transcendental plane of existence where the division between the objective and the subjective dimensions of the world is eliminated" and cosmic harmony can be attained. He makes a clear distinction between the world's deceptive appearance and the hidden "imagen completa del mundo", which is the true reality. He also develops the idea of a "daimonic power" that pervades the universe and is able to achieve this synthesis of the invisible underlying reality and its deceiving appearance. But a force powerful enough to do this is also capable of destroying the poet, as in the case of Hölderlin. The "Historial" was first published in instalments in México en la Cultura in 1958. It is a detailed account of Cernuda's intellectual development and gives great insight into the process of how he became a poet and how his poetry evolved over time. In a review in the Bulletin of Hispanic Studies, Arthur Terry described it as "the most remarkable piece of self-analysis by any Spanish poet, living or dead". It is, however, very reticent about his emotional development. For example, he only alludes very obliquely to the love affairs that inspired Los placeres prohibidos, Donde habite el olvido and "Poemas para un cuerpo".

== Cernuda and his contemporaries ==
=== Salinas and Guillén ===
He came to the attention of Pedro Salinas in his first year at Seville University - 1920-21 - and recorded, as late as 1958, that he would probably never have found his vocation as a poet had it not been for the older man's encouragement. However, his attitude towards Salinas seems to have been quite complex, as far as can be judged from his writings. In 1929 and 1930, his growing political militancy, inspired by his attraction to surrealism, made it difficult for him to tolerate friends whom he had come to consider bourgeois - such as Guillén, Salinas and even Aleixandre. Even though he might have reverted to friendly terms with Salinas and Guillén (and this was right at the start of his relationship with Aleixandre, when he viewed him as a comfortable bourgeois), in a collection of essays published in 1957, Estudios sobre Poesía española contemporánea, it is possible to see that he continues to view them as adhering to a different conception of poetry. For Cernuda, a true poet has to break away from society in some way, even if he might live a lifestyle that looks totally conventional from the outside, and these two poets never managed to do that. He does not approve of the playful qualities in Salinas's poetry and his seeming refusal to deal with profound subjects. When he considers the change that came over Salinas's poetry with La voz a ti debida, he dismisses it as

just another game, a desire to show that he was as human as the next man.

In truth, the poetry of Salinas was alien to Cernuda - so alien as to be antipathetic to him. His personal relationship with Salinas had probably never fully recovered from the blow of his apparent rejection of Perfil del aire in 1927. Not even his favourable review of the first edition of La realidad y el deseo seems to have appeased Cernuda for long. Salinas wrote an introduction to an anthology of Spanish poetry that was published in the 1940s and referred to Cernuda as el más Licenciado Vidriera de los poetas, an allusion to the Cervantes short story El licenciado Vidriera, in which the hero retreats timorously from life under the delusion that he is made of glass. In a poem called "Malentendu", included in Desolación de la Quimera, Cernuda launches a bitter attack on a man who, he claims, consistently misunderstood and ill-treated him, alluding specifically to that description.

His contacts with Guillén seem to have been more sporadic. Cernuda clearly valued his supportive words when Perfil del aire first appeared and he does not seem to have done anything to vex Cernuda. However the latter's assessment is based solely on the evidence of Cántico - the later collections had not begun to appear when Cernuda wrote about him. Clearly, the poet who wrote in "Beato sillón" that

El mundo está bien
Hecho

has a different view of reality than Cernuda. Nevertheless, Cernuda respects his dedication to his poetry and his commitment to revising it and making it better. However, he does regret that Guillén should have expended so much care and energy on expounding such a limited view of life. He notes what he views as Guillén's tendency to draw everything he sees into a contained, bourgeois viewpoint. He also notes the way that when Guillén writes about Lorca, the latter's life and works become a personal affair of the Guillén family. His assessment ends in a contradictory way. He views Guiillén as a poet in the manner of Coventry Patmore - a now forgotten 19thc. British poet - and yet also one of the 3 or 4 finest poets of his generation.

=== Aleixandre ===
One of the first things that Cernuda did on arriving in Madrid in 1928 was to pay a visit to Vicente Aleixandre. This was their first meeting. However, they did not immediately become friends and Cernuda blames it on his own timidity and distrust. He was struck by Aleixandre's warmth and friendliness, not realising until a later date that his visit had been during the hours when Aleixandre, for the sake of his health, would normally have been resting. Unfortunately he was also struck by Aleixandre's calmness and the sense of ease that he exuded at being in familiar surroundings. For Cernuda, who was always uneasy about feeling at home anywhere, this was a reason for deciding that he did not want to see Aleixandre again.

After his return to Madrid from Toulouse in June 1929, he met Aleixandre again: he recounts that it was Aleixandre who re-introduced himself to Cernuda as he himself did not recognise him. Gradually, over the course of many meetings, Cernuda's habitual reserve and distrust faded. His friendship with Vicente Aleixandre developed into the closest he had ever had. They often met in Aleixandre's house, sometimes with Lorca and Altolaguirre there as well. Aleixandre seems to have had a special gift for friendship, because he also became one of Lorca's closest friends (according to Ian Gibson). and Cernuda notes specifically his skill as an attentive and sympathetic listener. The implication is that he was trusted with the intimate confessions of many of his friends. Cernuda also gives a very favourable account of Aleixandre's poetry in Estudios sobre poesía española contemporánea, seeing in his work the struggle of a man of intense feeling trapped inside a sick body, an analogous situation to his own struggle for fulfilment.

However, not even Aleixandre was able to escape from Cernuda's sensitivity about his future reputation. In the 1950s, he wrote a few essays on his memories of Cernuda, which of course were fixed in the late 1920s and early 1930s. He describes his friend's apparent detachment from the world and unwillingness to engage. No attempt was made to see whether that old image still fitted the man who had gone through all the upheaval that Cernuda had experienced while going into exile. Perhaps more importantly, there was no attempt made to dissociate the poetry written by Cernuda, from Cernuda the man as Aleixandre had known him 20 years earlier.

=== Lorca ===
Cernuda's relationship with Lorca was one of the most important in his life, notwithstanding the fact of its brevity. He first met Lorca in Seville in December 1927, during the celebrations in honour of Góngora. He recalled this meeting in an article he wrote in 1938. They met on the patio of a hotel in the evening. Cernuda was struck by the contrast between Lorca's large, eloquent, melancholy eyes and his thickset peasant's body. He was not favourably impressed by his theatrical manner and by the way he was surrounded by hangers-on - reminiscent of a matador. However, something drew them together: "Something that I hardly understood or did not wish to acknowledge began to unite us....he took me by the arm and we left the others."

He next met Lorca three years later in Aleixandre's apartment in Madrid after Lorca's return from New York and Cuba. He noticed that something in Lorca had changed; he was less precious, less melancholy and more sensual.

Considering the friendship between them and his admiration for Lorca, Cernuda is dispassionate in his assessments of Lorca's poetry. He is not a whole-hearted admirer of the Romancero gitano, for example, unimpressed by the obscurity of the narratives in many of the individual poems and by the theatricality and outmoded costumbrismo of the collection as a whole. When he discusses Canciones, he deplores the jokiness of some of the poems -

an attitude unworthy of a poet, but more appropriate to the son of a wealthy family who, comfortable in his very bourgeois status, is able to mock it, because he knows that it will not cost him anything and that it will earn him the reputation of being a smart, witty chap.

He notes that this is a fleeting characteristic in Lorca but more persistent in someone such as Alberti. For Cernuda, poetry is a serious business and he tends not to approve of people who take it lightly. It also tends to show how his criticism is guided by his own principles. He tends to be more lenient in his judgments of poets who are like him. He seems to approve of the fact that after the success of the Romancero gitano, Lorca continued along his own track, not seduced into writing more gypsy ballads. In Poeta en Nueva York, a collection not published in Spain in Lorca's lifetime, Cernuda identifies the heart of the collection as the "Oda a Walt Whitman". This is interesting as it is a poem in which Lorca clearly shows his identification with homosexuals but Cernuda's reference is rather obscure -

in it the poet gives voice to a feeling that was the very reason of his existence and work. Because of that it is a pity that this poem is so confused, in spite of its expressive force.

On March 8, 1933, he was present at the premiere in Madrid of García Lorca's play Bodas de sangre. but he makes no reference to it, or indeed to any of Lorca's plays in his writings. He notes at the end of the chapter on Lorca in Estudios sobre Poesía española contemporánea that Lorca's later poems give clear signs to suggest that he had a lot more to say at the time of his death and that his style was developing in emotional force.

Cernuda wrote an elegy for Lorca which he included in Las nubes and to the end of his life took pains to try to ensure that the image of Lorca was not academicised, that he remained a figure of vitality, rebellion and nonconformism.

=== Dámaso Alonso ===
In 1948, Cernuda published an open letter to the famous critic Dámaso Alonso in reaction to an article by the latter titled Una generación poética (1920-36). He takes exception to two passages:

1. Cernuda, at that time very young
2. Cernuda was still a boy, almost isolated in Seville, in the year of our excursion to Seville, the same year in which Perfil del aire appeared in Málaga, which neither represents his mature work....

He points out that he was 25 at this time, so can scarcely be considered "very young" or a "boy". As for his isolation in Seville, Alonso should recall that he had already had poems published in the Revista de Occidente and elsewhere. However, it is noteworthy that in his later essay, Historial de un libro, he used the same expression to depict his sense of confusion at the hostile reviews to his first collection. He also criticises Alonso's use of the word "mature". He points out the essential inconsistency in saying that the poet was young and then expecting maturity in his early work. He then states that for him the key factor is not whether a poem is mature or not but whether it has artistic merit. He goes on to say that, even after the passage of time, he still prefers some of his earlier poems to certain poems written later.

The major complaint he raises is that this critique is just a lazy repetition of the initial critical reaction in 1927. One of his key beliefs is that there are poets who find their audience at once and poets who have to wait for an audience to come to them - he reiterates this in Historial de un libro. He is one of the latter. So when people like Alonso, who rejected his early work and still persist in calling it immature, now say he is a fine poet, he takes that to mean that they are merely picking up on the favourable reactions of people 20 years younger to his recent works - in other words, the audience that has found him - and that they are unable to see the continuities between the earlier and the later work.

This develops into a key theme of Cernuda's final collection. In "Malentendu", he shows his unease that his own reputation could be shaped beyond the grave by the perceptions of someone such as Pedro Salinas and his reference to El Licenciado Vidriera. In "Otra vez, con sentimiento", he shows the same unease on behalf of Lorca. Alonso had written in the same article (Una generación poética (1920-36)) a tribute to Lorca, calling him "my prince". Cernuda is keen to save his old friend from appropriation by reactionary forces, defending his unconventional lifestyle (homosexuality) and everything else about him that would prevent him from being free to live in Franco's Spain.

=== Alberti and political commitment ===
Alberti was another of the people whom he met for the first time in the Góngora celebrations in Seville in 1927. Alberti describes him as "dark, thin, extremely refined and meticulous". However, it is not likely that Alberti ever became close to Cernuda although the latter contributed to many of the former's journals during the early 1930s. Alberti invited him to contribute to the celebratory album that he was editing but Cernuda did not follow it up. His relationship with Alberti is suggestive of the pathways along which his mind was moving after his initial contact with surrealism. In 1933, for example, he wrote for Alberti's magazine Octubre a piece called Los que se incorporan (Those who join up). In it he calls for the destruction of bourgeois society: "I trust in a revolution inspired by communism to achieve this".

In an article written for Hora de España in 1937, he wrote that: "the poet is inevitably a revolutionary... a revolutionary with full awareness of his responsibility". However, by that time, it seems clear that he did not expect poets to get directly involved in revolutionary actions. In an essay devoted to Aleixandre in 1950 he goes so far as to say that, for a poet to take the course of direct action "is absurd and tends to ruin the poet as a poet".

This attitude seems to colour his response to Alberti's poetic output. A key point in Cernuda's view of Alberti's poetry is that Alberti seemed to lack any sense of self and his poetry lacks interiority. He also highlights the fact that Alberti was a virtuoso versifier, able to counterfeit the manner of Gil Vicente or any other folk poet. Cernuda does not approve of the playfulness that Alberti shows in his first three collections. He does not believe that Alberti rises above the level of his models, such as Góngora and Guillén in Cal y canto - in other words he sees Alberti as a parodist rather than as an original poet. The reader gets the impression that he envies the fact that Alberti became so successful so rapidly, using him as an example of a poet who found his public immediately. These thoughts were written in his essay in Estudios sobre poesía espaňola contemporánea on Alberti and seem to derive from Eliot's essay "Tradition and the Individual Talent", because he goes on to draw a contrast between writers who are readily accepted by the public with writers who are more original, who modify the tradition with their own experiences of life and who have to wait for the public to accept them. Cernuda ends up by praising his poetic fluency and virtuosity while stating that he had nothing to say and that his work is basically deprived of passion and emotion. Cernuda even wonders whether Alberti's recognition of the social injustice of Spain was the inspiration for him to write political poetry because it is difficult to see any fundamental change in his ideas and feelings. The political poems are not very different from his previous phase and he remains just as committed to traditional poetic forms as ever. Cernuda closes his essay by noting that Alberti's commitment to Communism does not stop him from turning to apolitical subject-matter in which the reader can divine nostalgia for his former success. In an attempt to revive this, he churns out variations of his old themes.

=== Altolaguirre and his family ===
That there was a close bond between Altolaguirre, his wife Concha Méndez, and Cernuda seems clear. Cernuda devoted separate chapters in both Estudios sobre poesía española contemporánea and Poesía y literatura to the poetry of Altolaguirre, consistently asserting that he was not a minor poet, despite the critical consensus to that effect. In Desolación de la Quimera, he defends his dead friend from superficial, mistaken memories of "Manolito" the endearing man, held by people who have forgotten or never knew his rare gifts as a poet, in "Supervivencias tribales en el medio literario". It is like an echo of his fears for what will happen to his own reputation after death - will people remember him or turn to the legends promulgated by people like Salinas.

When Altolaguirre and Concha married in June 1932, Cernuda was one of the witnesses at their wedding, along with Lorca, Juan Ramón Jiménez, and Guillén. When in March 1933 their first child died in childbirth, Cernuda dedicated a poem to him - "XIV" in Donde habite el olvido. They lived in the same building in Madrid from 1935 to 1936 and, in Mexico, he lived in Concha's house. At times, it seems that this was his real family. In Desolación de la Quimera, there are two poems that suggest this. "Animula, vagula, blandula" is a tender poem about watching Altolaguirre's five-year-old grandson, whom he nicknamed Entelechy, playing in the garden and wondering how his fate will differ from his own. "Hablando a Manona" is like a nursery rhyme addressed to their granddaughter.

=== Generation of 1898 ===
Cernuda's best critical writing tends to be about writers who interested and inspired him. His writing about the Generation of 1898 is objective but nevertheless lacking in sympathy for the most part. For one thing, he seems to have found it difficult to forge personal relations with them. Regarding Juan Ramón Jiménez and Valle-Inclán, he recalled that they were so intent on their own speech that they neglected to listen to other people. And even in respect of Antonio Machado, so revered by for example Alberti, he recalled that he spoke little and listened to even less. In contrast to most Spanish thinkers, he respected Unamuno more as a poet than as a philosopher. For Ortega y Gasset, he had little positive to say: scattered all through Cernuda's critical writings are remarks such as "[he] always understood very little when it came to poetry" and "with his strange ignorance of poetic matters".

Regarding Valle-Inclán, he makes it clear in his 1963 essay how much he admires his integrity as an artist and human being. He does not rate his poetry very highly, does not comment often on his novels and reserves his admiration for 4 plays, the 3 Comedias bárbaras and Divinas palabras.

In his study Estudios sobre poesía española contemporánea, Cernuda is clearly drawn to those aspects of Antonio Machado where he finds similarities with his own poetic practice. So, for him, the best of Machado is in the early poems of Soledades, where he finds echoes of Bécquer. He writes of them

these poems are sudden glimpses of the world, bringing together the real and the suprasensible, with a rarely achieved identification.

He is also drawn to the commentaries of Abel Martín and the notes of Juan de Mairena which began to appear in 1925. In these, he finds the "sharpest commentary on the epoch". On the other hand, he is definitely not attracted by the nationalistic themes that appear in Campos de Castilla, especially the poet's focus on Castile, which Cernuda sees as negating the essence of Machado's best poetry, which stems from his Andalusian nature. However, this is difficult to reconcile with a strand of Cernuda's own poetry, as exemplified by the first poem of the "Díptico español" from Desolación de la Quimera, which is a tirade of invective against Spain that would not seem out of place in Machado. Indeed, one of Cernuda's major themes is the contrast between modern Spain after the Civil War and the glorious past, which is also an important current in Machado's poetry. One aspect of Machado that he focuses on is his use of language and how he fails when he tries to emulate the type of popular language described by German Romantics. He shows particular scorn for Machado's attempt to write a popular ballad, "La tierra de Alvargonzález". As Octavio Paz says:

"Jiménez and Antonio Machado always confused "popular language" with spoken language, and that is why they identify the latter with traditional song. Jiménez thought that "popular art" was simply the traditional imitation of aristocratic art; Machado believed that the true aristocracy resided in the people and that folklore was the most refined art.......Influenced by Jiménez, the poets of Cernuda's generation made of ballad and of song their favourite genre. Cernuda never succumbed to the affectation of the popular.....and tried to write as one speaks; or rather: he set himself as the raw material of poetic transmututation not the language of books but of conversation

The member of that generation who had most impact on him is Jiménez, although when he went to Britain one of the very few books that he took with him was Gerardo Diego's anthology Poesía española and he found solace for his nostalgia for Spain in reading the selection of poems by Unamuno and Machado contained within. It is also true that in his study of Unamuno, he makes a comment that seems to relate directly to his own practice as a writer, his preoccupation with creating and perpetuating himself in his poetry, transforming the circumstances of his life into myth:

Alive and striving beyond what were only current circumstances, moments that pass and do not remain, Unamuno was hoping to create himself, or at least create his personal myth, and to be forever what was passing.

He first met Jiménez in late September-early October 1925 in Seville. The meeting had been arranged by Pedro Salinas and he suggested to Cernuda that he should ask one of his friends, whose father was a warden of the Alcázar, for permission to visit the gardens, out of hours. Cernuda's account is interesting. He was overawed by being in the presence of such an important figure. In addition, there was the presence of Jiménez's wife - Zenobia Camprubí - which also put him at a disadvantage, both because of his shyness and a lack of interest in women, although he had not yet realised why women did not interest him. He placed himself in the role of a disciple, just listening to the Master. He records how gracious Jiménez was to him that evening and on subsequent meetings. At that time, he was something of a hero to Cernuda and he notes how much effort it cost him to free himself from Jiménez's type of egoistic, subjective poetry with no connection to the world and life, which was so influential in Spanish cultural circles at that time.

In the essay in which he describes this meeting, "Los Dos Juan Ramón Jiménez", included in Poesía y literatura vol 2, he analyses the Jekyll and Hyde personality of Jiménez. On the one hand he was a famous poet, worthy of admiration and respect. On the other hand, he was the man who launched abusive attacks on numerous literary figures. This latter side gradually became more and more dominant. In particular he took against the poets of Cernuda's own generation, at first confining his attacks to verbal ones but then turning to print. He continued to print vilifications right to the end of his life, which had the effect of turning Cernuda's former admiration into indifference or even worse.

Cernuda wrote many pieces about Jiménez, including a satirical poem included in Desolación de la Quimera. The early influence was decisively rejected and his essays identify all the stylistic elements that he cast off, such as the impressionistic symbolism, hermeticism, the fragmentation of his poems, his inability to sustain a thought, the lack of desire to go beyond the surface of things. His final thoughts about Jiménez came in an essay titled "Jiménez y Yeats" dated 1962 and included in Poesía y literatura vol 2. E.M. Wilson included a look at this in his survey of Cernuda's literary borrowings because it contains a translation of Yeats's poem "A Coat" and compares it to Jiménez's "Vino, primera, pura". Of the translation, Wilson writes

One can point out minor infidelities....but the translation has life of its own and fulfils its purpose in Cernuda's essay: a rod for the back of Juan Ramón Jiménez.

Cernuda concludes that Jiménez is a more limited poet than Yeats because the latter put his poetry to one side in order to campaign for Irish Home Rule and to work as director of the Abbey Theatre in Dublin whereas Jiménez's whole life was totally dedicated to poetry. He devoted himself to aesthetics and did not involve himself with ethical considerations at all.

== Gide, the dandy and homosexuality ==
His sexual awakening seems to have coincided with the birth of his desire to write poetry, around the age of 14, but it was many years later before he really came to terms with this side of himself. A very important influence on his emotional development were the writings of André Gide. In Historial de un libro, Cernuda wrote that his introduction to the works of Gide was when Pedro Salinas gave him either Prétextes or Nouveaux Prétextes to read, followed by Morceaux Choisis, which is a selection by Gide himself of passages from his works. These books opened the way for him to resolve or at least reconcile himself with "a vital, decisive problem within me". These works deal openly with the topic of homosexuality amongst many other things. For example, Gide included in the Morceaux Choisis the section of Les Caves du Vatican where Lafcadio Wluiki pushes Amédée Fleurissoire out of a moving train just from curiosity as to whether he can actually bring himself to do it - the original acte gratuit. Cernuda comments,"I fell in love with his youth, his grace, his freedom, his audacity." This is redolent of the homoeroticism of a poem such as "Los marineros son las alas del amor" in Los placeres prohibidos. He went so far as to write a fan letter, perhaps even a love letter, to Lafcadio, which was printed in El Heraldo de Madrid in 1931. It includes these words: "the only real thing in the end is the free man, who does not feel part of anything, but lives wholly perfect and unique in the midst of nature, free from imposed and polluting customs." This is reiterated in his essay of 1946, where he writes: "the transcendent figure for Gide is not that of a man who by means of abstention and denial searches for the divine, but that of a man who seeks out the fullness of humanity by means of effort and individual exaltation." In other words, he was affected by the idea of total hedonism without any sense of guilt.

Another idea that he takes from Gide is expressed in Book 1 of Les Nourritures Terrestres:

There is profit in desires, and profit in the satisfaction of desires - for so they are increased. And indeed, Nathaniel, each one of my desires has enriched me more than the always deceitful possession of the object of my desire.

So hedonism and the exaltation of desire are not enough in themselves; what matters is the dignity and integrity of the desire. That is what gives it virtue, not the object of the desire. As Cernuda expressed it, "what he holds in his arms is life itself, rather than a desired body." In "Unos cuerpos son como flores", another poem from Los placeres prohibidos, the transience of love is accepted as a perfectly normal phenomenon because it is the transcendent nature of that love that overrides everything. Following Gide's example, Cernuda becomes concerned with maintaining his personal integrity. Free from guilt, he will live true to his own values, which include rejection of conventional sexual mores and acceptance of his homosexuality. In "La palabra edificante", Octavio Paz wrote "Gide gave him the courage to give things their proper names; the second book of his surrealist period is called Los placeres prohibidos (Forbidden Pleasures). He does not call them, as one might have expected Los placeres pervertidos (Perverse Pleasures)".

Cernuda's reading of Gide was thorough. As well as the works mentioned above, his essay includes discussions of the "Journals", Les cahiers d'André Walter, Le Traité du Narcisse, Paludes, Le Prométhée Mal Enchaîné, Les Nourritures Terrestres, Amyntas, L'Immoraliste, La Porte Etroite, Le Retour de l'Enfant Prodigue, Corydon, Les Caves du Vatican, Les Faux Monnayeurs, Si le grain ne meurt, and Thésée. One of the most interesting passages concerns Gide's memoirs, Si le grain ne meurt. Many of the episodes recounted in this book had formed the basis for his previous works; however, this new account is not so much a repetition as a complement to the previous versions. The reader gets a broader vision of what was happening. Gide's works are clarified and are heightened when they can be interpreted in the light of the extra information in the memoirs. It was clearly with a similar aim in mind that Cernuda set out writing Historial de un libro, to recount "the story of the personal events that lie behind the verses of La realidad y el deseo." Narcissism is another trait that Gide and Cernuda shared: "After all, we cannot know anybody better than our self."

At times, it seems that the two writers share the same sensibility. For example, Gide had visited Seville in 1892, in company with his mother, and was struck by the gardens of the Alcázar. This made its way into Les nourritures terrestres: "What of the Alcazar? Marvellous as a Persian garden! Now I come to speak of it, I believe I prefer it to all the others. When I read Hafiz, I think of it." Cernuda describes a similar sense of transcendence in "Jardín antiguo" in Ocnos. Gide was in Seville during Semana Santa and revelled in the sensuality of the celebrations. In his journals, he describes how there was a feeling of loosening the corsets and throwing off prudish morality, which is quite similar to the atmosphere of Cernuda's poem "Luna llena en Semana Santa" from Desolación de la Quimera.

As seen in his accounts of his first meetings with Jiménez in 1925 and Lorca in 1927, he took a few years to come to terms fully with his sexuality. This only seems to happen once he finally left Seville in 1928, after his mother's death. However, during that period he seems to have cultivated his sense of difference by becoming a dandy. During his time at the University of Seville, Salinas had already noted his dapper appearance, commenting on his "well-cut suit, a perfectly-knotted tie". This tendency seems to have intensified during his brief stay in Madrid before going to Toulouse, where he assumed the pose of a man who frequents bars, drinks cocktails, affects English shirts, discussed in an article by Villena (La rebeldía del dandy en Luis Cernuda). Villena diagnoses it as the sign of a refined hermit trying to hide his hyper-sensitivity and repressed desire for love. In Toulouse, he wrote to a friend that he was starting to think that he was too well-dressed. Two months later, he wrote to the same friend complaining that he had only managed to make female friends - the young men being too coarse for him - and boasting about some purchases: an American hat exactly like the one worn by Gilbert Roland in the film Camille, a wristwatch that cost 1000 francs and some other things "simply so that during these courses they might call me a snob and accuse me of being frivolous and lightweight." He also says that he sometimes wears his moustache in the manner of Don Alvarado or Nils Asther. In his short story El indolente Cernuda reflects on dandyism:

a certain friend once claimed to convince the writer of this that he dressed and adorned himself not to attract but rather to rebuff people from his side. He had noticed, or thought he had noticed, that if an elegant women attracts, the elegant man repels. According to this theory, dandyism would be just one of the ways of aspiring to the ascetic solitude of the wasteland.

In some way, however, the combination of his contact with the world, especially the atmosphere of Paris which he visited in the university vacations, the rebellious attitudes and thinking of the surrealists, the influence of Gide, and his pent-up fight against bourgeois tendencies coincided in the belated acceptance of his sexuality, as expressed finally in Un río, un amor. His dandified style of dressing seems to have continued for the rest of his life. For example in 1950, he stayed overnight with Jorge Guillén and the latter wrote to Pedro Salinas,"What a blue robe with white spots...what a smell of perfume in the passageway on rising the following morning!"

== Critical reception and legacy ==
For a long time, the reactions of critics to Cernuda's poetry were based on a caricature of his personality - the shy, introverted but prickly person so quick to take offence. Concha de Albornoz, one of his closest friends, wrote of him "his is a climate that changes: now serene, now tormented. Sometimes I feel so close to him and at other times so distant ... His spirit is like a fly's eye: made of a thousand facets." He found it difficult to make friends. Many of the people who knew him allude to his aloofness and this is a trait borne out by the critical comments he makes in his writings about his contemporaries, which are sometimes so harsh that it is hard to believe they were ever friends or colleagues. Cernuda was well aware that his reputation was of a complicated, tortured individual and this became a matter of concern for him in his later years. In the final poem in his final collection, "A sus paisanos", he criticises his countrymen for the way they have accepted this perception of him, without making any effort to see if it is justified. He makes it clear that this "legend" is a gross distortion of reality:

¿Mi leyenda dije? Tristes cuentos
Inventados de mí por cuatro amigos
(¿Amigos?), que jamás quisisteis
Ni ocasión buscasteis de ver si acomodaban
A la persona misma así traspuesta.
Mas vuestra mala fe los ha aceptado

(Did I say my legend? Sad tales made up about me by four friends, (Friends?), that you never wanted nor sought any occasion to check to see whether they fitted that person thus superimposed. But your bad faith has accepted them)

It seems likely that the four "friends" were Juan Ramón Jiménez, Pedro Salinas, Vicente Aleixandre and José Moreno Villa. Jiménez shows him as aloof and effete to the point of sickliness. Aleixandre emphasises Cernuda's solitariness and detachment from the world. Salinas shows him as dedicated, timid, solitary and fragile. Moreno Villa, in his autobiography, concentrates on the tortured side of his character and effeminacy: "He was then a fine and shy young man, very dapper and very sad. He suffered with material things and with human relationships. They say he cried in front of the windows of clothes's shops because he could not buy some silk shirts; but I, of course, have seen him almost in tears for not having friends or anyone to love him."

It is striking that all these accounts refer to the young man they knew in the 1920s and 1930s but Moreno Villas wrote his autobiography in 1944; Salinas wrote his description in 1945 and Aleixandre in 1955. The only contemporary account was Jiménez's from 1934. Cernuda's character seems to have left a lasting impression on them which they do not seem to have thought of revising. The fundamental problem is the unquestioning, if not naive, belief that the poetry is the man, that there is no distinction between them. They project the brittle, languid, effete personality of the man they knew onto his poetry even though it reveals a very partial, incomplete and misleading reading. It might apply to some of the earlier work but it bears no relation to the passion of the surrealist poems, or the later poems of reflection and self-examination, or the use of the Doppelgänger device. Even as late as 1962, it was possible for a critic to write "he is so accustomed by now to live surrounded only by the creations of his own mind - who obey him always and are much more easily controlled than people - that real company bothers him." The projection of these unbalanced ideas of the man onto the poetry - a man seeking to escape from the real world - was the dominant theme of Cernuda criticism, even among people who never met him.

It was not until 1965 that a different viewpoint began to emerge. The key was the publication in that year of Octavio Paz's essay La palabra edificante: "Cernuda's work is an exploration of himself...He said it himself:'I have only tried, like every man, to find my truth, my own, which will not be better or worse than that of others, only different.'...The work of Cernuda is a road toward our own selves. That is what gives it its moral value." Cernuda is a moralist, a seeker after truth rather than an effete man of glass. Of course, this is implied by the title he chose for his oeuvre, La realidad y el deseo. His work is grounded in reality and he criticises poets, such as Juan Ramón Jiménez, who try to escape from or ignore reality. In the words of Villena, "Cernuda defends liberty, anti-conventionalism, joy, faithfulness to your own destiny, the individual leading the way for other people, a blend of stoicism and epicureanism." He goes on to compare the satirical poems in Cernuda's final collection to those of Persius, Juvenal and Quevedo as they are not merely personal attacks but also defences of a moral code that is different from that held by the person being attacked, a different set of ethics.

Towards the end of his life, Cernuda was gratified to learn that a younger generation of Spanish writers were taking an interest in his work. Given the censorship that was operating in Spain at the time, it must have been difficult to get hold of unexpurgated copies of Cernuda's poetry. The first tangible sign was an edition of the magazine Cántico dedicated to his work in 1955. In a letter to the scholar José Luis Cano, he gives praise to an essay by Vicente Núñez, accuses Adriano del Valle of inventing anecdotes about him, such as wearing patent leather shoes or yellow gloves, and claims not to believe a word of the praise that they give him. It is interesting that Cernuda does not mention the fact that Aleixandre also made a contribution to that issue, one of the essays that stoked the legend of Luis Cernuda. However, he was sufficiently impressed to commend the homage to a young British scholar, Derek Harris, who was starting his researches into Cernuda's works.

This was followed in 1962 by a special edition of La caña gris. This homage seems to have pleased him even more than the earlier one, with the exception of another contribution by Aleixandre and one by Juan Gil-Albert. Two of the contributors were poets who showed signs of Cernuda's influence -Jaime Gil de Biedma and José Valente. Biedma wrote an elegy for him called "Después de la noticia de su muerte". Another poet of that generation who was influenced by him was Francisco Brines.

== Popular culture ==
- A sculptural monument to Cernuda stands in Sevilla, Spain.
- Spanish painter Gregorio Prieto drew portraits of Luis Cernuda and Vicente Aleixandre.
- The Spanish government has issued several postage stamps featuring portraits of Cernuda, including a stamp issued on the one hundredth anniversary of the poet's birth.

== Bibliography ==
- Harris, Derek (1973). Luis Cernuda: A study of the Poetry. London: Tamesis Books Ltd. p. 188. ISBN 0-900411-70-8.
- Alberti, Rafael (1976). The Lost Grove (trans Gabriel Berns). Berkeley and Los Angeles: University of California Press. p. 323. ISBN 0-520-02786-8.
- Connell, Geoffrey (1977). Spanish Poetry of the Grupo poetico de 1927. Oxford: Pergamon Press. p. 214. ISBN 0-08-016950-3.
- Morris, C (February 22, 1979). A Generation of Spanish Poets. Cambridge University Press. ISBN 0521294819.
- Gibson, Ian (1989). Federico Garcia Lorca. London: Faber and Faber. p. 551. ISBN 0-571-14224-9.
- Guillen, Jorge (1961). Language and Poetry. Cambridge, Mass.: Harvard University Press. p. 293. 60-15889.(Library of Congress Catalog Card Number)
- Pérez Firmat, Gustavo (2003). Tongue Ties: Logo-Eroticism in Anglo-Hispanic Literature. Palgrave.
- Cernuda, Luis (1994). Derek Harris and Luis Maristany (ed.). Obra completa Prosa 2 vols. Madrid: Ediciones Siruela.
- Cernuda, Luis (1984). Luis Antonio de Villena (ed.). Las Nubes; Desolacion de la Quimera. Madrid: Ediciones Catedra. p. 213. ISBN 84-376-0480-X.
- Cernuda, Luis (1999). Derek Harris (ed.). Un rio, un amor and Los placeres prohibidos. Madrid: Ediciones Catedra. p. 173. ISBN 84-376-1750-2.
- Valender, James. "Stanley Richardson and Spain". Revista Canaria de Estudios Ingleses (Tenerife), 7, pp. 61-72.
- Murphy, Martin (April 26, 2013). "Pub Poets". Times Literary Supplement: 14.
- Cernuda, Luis (1993). Derek Harris and Luis Maristany (ed.). Poesía completa. Madrid: Ediciones Siruela. p. 863.
- Cernuda, Luis (1999). Reginald Gibbons (ed.). Selected Poems of Luis Cernuda (Bilingual ed.). Riverdale-on-Hudson: The Sheep Meadow Press. p. 185. ISBN 1-878818-80-5.
- Altolaguirre, Manuel (1972). Margarita Smerdou Altolaguirre (ed.). Las Islas invitadas. Madrid: Editorial Castalia. p. 162. ISBN 84-7039-160-7.
- Wilson, Edward (1972). Nigel Glendinning (ed.). Cernuda's Debts in Studies in Modern Spanish Literature and Art presented to Helen F. Grant. London: Tamesis Books. p. 259.
- Taravillo, Antonio (2008). Luis Cernuda Años españoles. Barcelona: Tusquets Editores. p. 449. ISBN 978-84-8383-062-8.
- Cernuda, Luis (2003). Valender, James (ed.). Epistolario 1924-1963. Madrid: Publicaciones de la Residencia de Estudiantes. p. 1273. ISBN 84-95078-15-5.
- Gide, Andre (1977). Fruits of the Earth (Les Nourritures Terrestres). Harmondsworth, Middlesex, UK: Penguin.
- Taylor, John (2017). Into the heart of European poetry. Oxford, UK: Routledge. p. 399. ISBN 978-1-4128-0797-5.
- J. A. Coleman, Other voices. A study of the late poetry of Luis Cernuda (North Carolina University Press, 1969)
- (in Spanish) Ph. Silver, Luis Cernuda: el poeta en su leyenda (Madrid, 1972)
- (in Spanish) D. Harris (ed.), Luis Cernuda (Madrid, 1977)
- (in Spanish) R. Martínez Nadal, Españoles en la Gran Bretaña: Luis Cernuda. El hombre y sus temas (Madrid, 1983)
- (in Italian) M. Petrelli, "L'arte pura in tutte le lingue del mondo: Luis Cernuda" in "Confluenze. Rivista di Studi Iberoamericani", vol. 1, n. 2, 2009.
- (in Spanish) M. Ulacia, L. Cernuda: escritura, cuerpo y deseo (Barcelona, 1986).
