= Vicente Aleixandre =

Spanish poet (1898–1984)

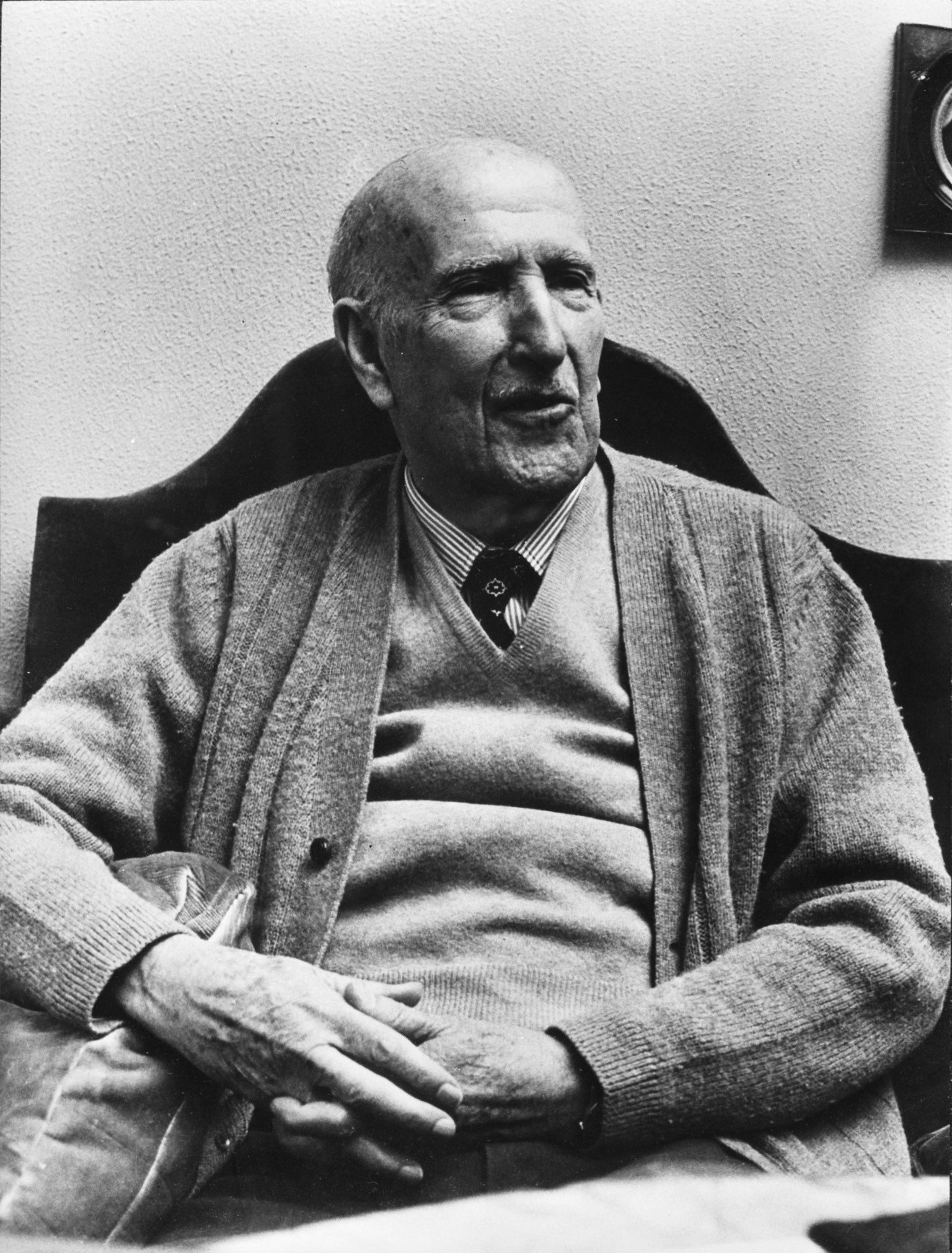
- Aleixandre in 1977
- Born: Vicente Pío Marcelino Cirilo Aleixandre y Merlo; 26 April 1898; Seville, Spain
- Died: 14 December 1984 (aged 86); Madrid, Spain
- Occupation: Poet
- Writing career
- Notable awards: Nobel Prize in Literature; 1977

Seat O of the Real Academia Española
- In office 22 January 1950 – 14 December 1984
- Preceded by: Félix de Llanos y Torriglia
- Succeeded by: Pere Gimferrer

Vicente Pío Marcelino Cirilo Aleixandre y Merlo (Spanish: [biˈθente alejɣˈsandɾe]; 26 April 1898 – 14 December 1984) was a Spanish poet who was born in Seville. Aleixandre received the Nobel Prize for Literature in 1977 "for a creative poetic writing which illuminates man's condition in the cosmos and in present-day society, at the same time representing the great renewal of the traditions of Spanish poetry between the wars". He was part of the Generation of '27.

Aleixandre's early poetry, which he wrote mostly in free verse, is highly surrealistic. It also praises the beauty of nature by using symbols that represent the earth and the sea. Many of Aleixandre's early poems are filled with sadness. They reflect his feeling that people have lost the passion and free spirit that he saw in nature. He was one of the greatest poets of Spanish literature alongside Cernuda and Lorca. The melancholia of his poetry was also the melancholy of failed or ephemeral love affairs.

Aleixandre's bisexuality was well known to his circle of friends, but he never admitted it publicly. He had a long-term love relationship with the poet Carlos Bousoño.

He died on 14 December 1984 in Madrid, aged 86.

== His works ==
His early collections of poetry include Passion of the Earth (1935) and Destruction or Love (1933). In 1944, he wrote Shadow of Paradise, the poetry where he first began to concentrate on themes such as fellowship, friendliness, and spiritual unity. His later books of poetry include History of the Heart (1954) and In a Vast Dominion (1962).

Aleixandre studied law at the University of Madrid. Selections of his work were translated into English in Twenty Poems of Vicente Aleixandre (1977) and A Longing for the Light: Selected Poems of Vincent Aleixandre (1979; Copper Canyon Press, 2007) translated by Lewis Hyde.

During the Civil War Aleixandre was among the contributors of El Mono Azul, a Republican cultural magazine.

=== Pure poetry ===
His first book, Ámbito, written between 1924 and 1927 and published in Málaga in 1928, is the work of an incipient poet who has not yet found his own voice. The assonated short verse and art for art's sake aesthetics of Juan Ramón Jiménez and Jorge Guillén prevail, in addition to the ultraistic echoes of classical Spanish poetry from the Golden Age, especially Fray Luis de León and Góngora.

=== Surreal poetry ===
In the following years, between 1928 and 1932, there is a radical change in Aleixandre's poetic conception. Inspired by the predecessors of surrealism (especially Arthur Rimbaud and Lautréamont) and by Freud, he adopts prose poetry (Passion of the Earth, 1935), free verse, and plainly surreal methods such as free verse and the visionary image (Swords like Lips, 1932; Destruction or Love, 1935; Shadow of Paradise, 1944) as his form of expression. The aesthetics of these poems are irrational, and the expression comes close to "flow", even without accepting it as a dogma of faith. Along with surrealism, the poet does not take on any tradition, not even the metric, and frees himself. Luis Cernuda could say: "Your verse is like nothing else." And in effect his style brings unpublished stylistic novelties such as the inverted simile (Swords like Lips) or the equivalent disjunctive nexus (Destruction or Love), the hyperbole adds, the uncoded dream symbol, enriching without question the stylistic possibilities of the Spanish poetic language, just as Garcilaso, Góngora and Rubén Darío, each one a great renovator of lyric language, did in the past. The poet celebrates love as a natural, ungovernable force that breaks down all human limitations and criticizes the conventionalism with which society attempts to conquer it.

== Popular culture ==
- A sculptural monument to Aleixandre, designed by the Spanish artist Juan López Ballesteros, is installed in la plaza mayor in Madrid, Spain.
- The Spanish government has issued several postage stamps featuring portraits of Aleixandre, including a centenary series in 2001.
- Poesin blev min räddning (1977), documentary directed by Humberto López y Guerra about the Spanish Literature Nobel Prize Winner Vicente Aleixandre produced for Swedish Television TV1-Kultur
