= Las Sinsombrero =

Spanish group of female thinkers and artists

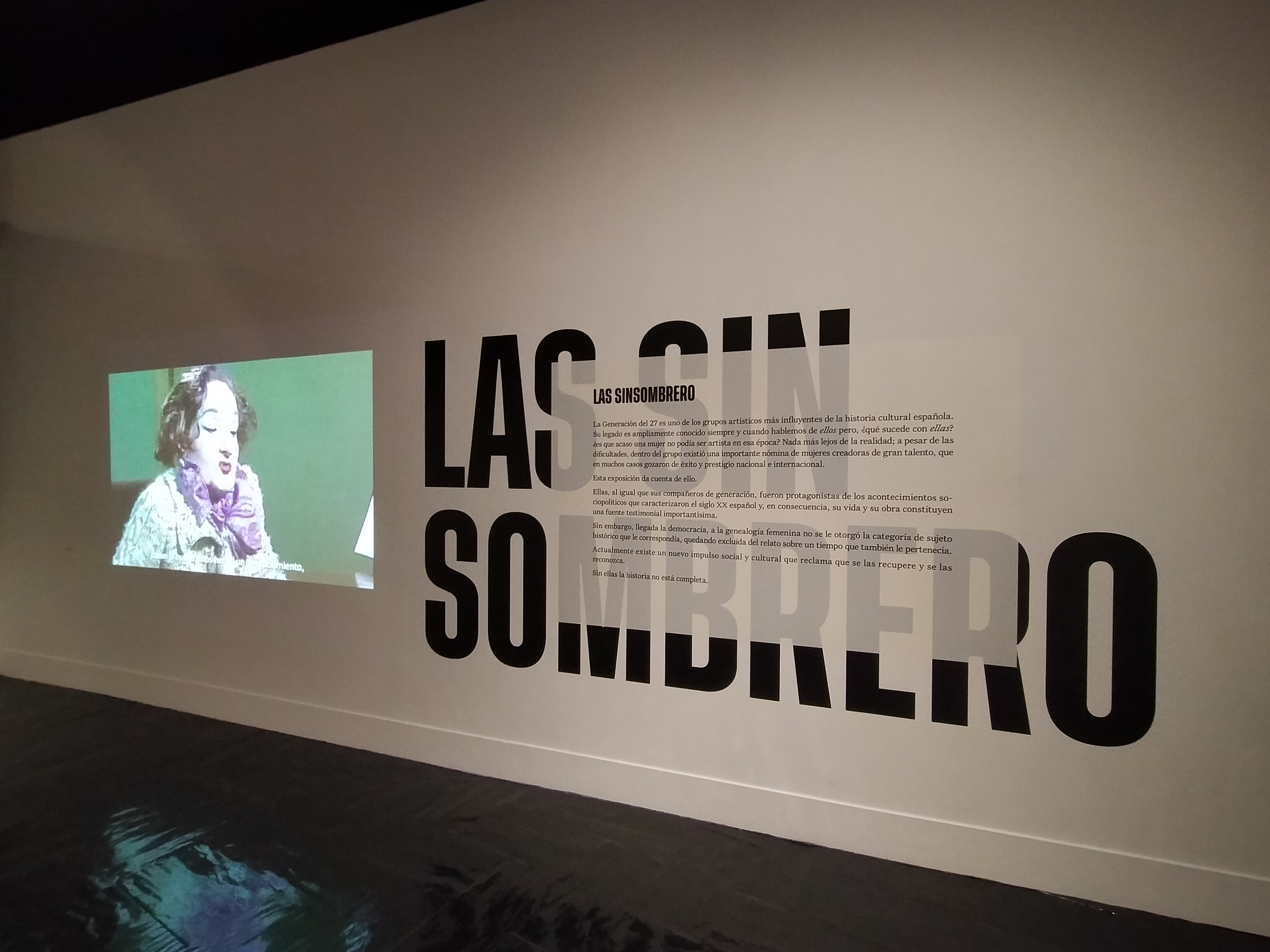

Las Sinsombrero (Spanish for "hatless women") were a group of female thinkers and artists in the Generation of '27. They were so named for the initiative taken by Maruja Mallo, Margarita Manso, Salvador Dalí and Federico García Lorca of removing their hats in public at Puerta del Sol in Madrid as a form of protest. Film producer Tània Balló describes the hats as representing an "intellectual corset that relegated them to the mere role of wives and mothers".

A 2015 film about the group, named Las Sinsombrero, included the members of the group Maruja Mallo and Concha Mendez.

"They threw stones at us, calling us all sorts of things", Mallo herself recounts in recordings made by Spanish National TV (TVE) after returning from exile. The documentary "Las Sinsombrero", which gathered together a large amount of material and interviewed researchers and relatives of these women, took up the impulse of those who had worked for decades to rescue them in the more or less erudite or academic sphere, especially within university circles, in order to disseminate and extend it to the general public. The success of the documentary spread interest in this group and consolidated the label with which they are known today.

Most of them lived, studied, and practiced their art in Madrid. While embracing modernity and European avant-garde movements, they also drew on popular traditions. Engaged with their social context, their work contributed to significant developments in Spain’s cultural and artistic landscape.

Their contributions are still little studied and, for the most part, have remained on the margins of anthologies and manuals on art and literature to the present day, although they developed a constant and outstanding activity in fields as varied as literature, poetry, painting, music, film and philosophy. Many of them ended up in exile after the outbreak of the Spanish Civil War and continued their production outside Spain, which made them even more recognised outside their own country.

== Famous members ==
Category:Las Sinsombrero members

- Maruja Mallo (1902–1995), painter
- Rosario de Velasco (1904–1991), painter
- Margarita Gil Roësset (1908–1932), sculptor
- Remedios Varo (1908 - 1963) - painter
- María Zambrano (1904–1991), philosopher
- María Teresa León (1903–1988), journalist
- Josefina de la Torre (1907–2002), poet
- Rosa Chacel (1898–1994), journalist and novelist
- Ernestina de Champourcín (1905–1999), poet
- Concha Méndez (1898–1986), poet
- Margarita Manso (1908–1960), painter
- Delhy Tejero (1904–1968), painter
- Ángeles Santos Torroella (1911–2013), painter
- Concha de Albornoz (1900–1972), feminist writer
- Luisa Carnés (1905–1964), journalist and writer

== Background ==
Understanding the historical background of Las Sinsombrero is understanding the years of Primo de Rivera's dictatorship, those of the Second Republic and the Civil War in Spain.

After the loss of the last colonies (Cuba, the Philippines and Puerto Rico), the country was plunged into a deep national crisis that led to economic, political and intellectual changes. This new Spain was soon joined by the debate on the "women's question". Immersed in an anti-feminist wave that used biological determinism to justify the inequality of the sexes and to point out the weakness of the female gender, society and its most traditionalist classes sought to curb the emergence of a new European woman, who had become autonomous during the First World War, forced to take the place of the men who marched to the front.

It is in this context that the feminist and suffragette movements appeared, driven by those who became aware of their intellectual capacity and decided not to accept a submissive role again. Participation in public life and access to education generated cosmopolitan, independent, creative women. In Spain, the process was consolidated with the proclamation of the Second Republic in 1931. Women not only reflected their modernity in their physical appearance and their way of dressing, but they also had a professional vocation, cultural training, political awareness and applauded technological and social advances. Las Sinsombrero, following the incorporation into the world of work and politics that the women of the Generation of 1914 lead on (Clara Campoamor, Victoria Kent or Carmen de Burgos, among others), presented themselves to society and also conquered the artistic world.

The Civil War cut this patch short and its outcome was a brutal setback to the progress made in previous decades. Long exiles were the general trend for these women, who found a new space in America and Europe. Those who remained in Spain suffered reprisals that included imprisonment and, in many cases, intellectual silence which was achieved by killing them in most cases.
