= St. Stanislaus Kostka College, Málaga =

St. Stanislaus Kostka College
- Spanish: Colegio San Estanislao de Kostka

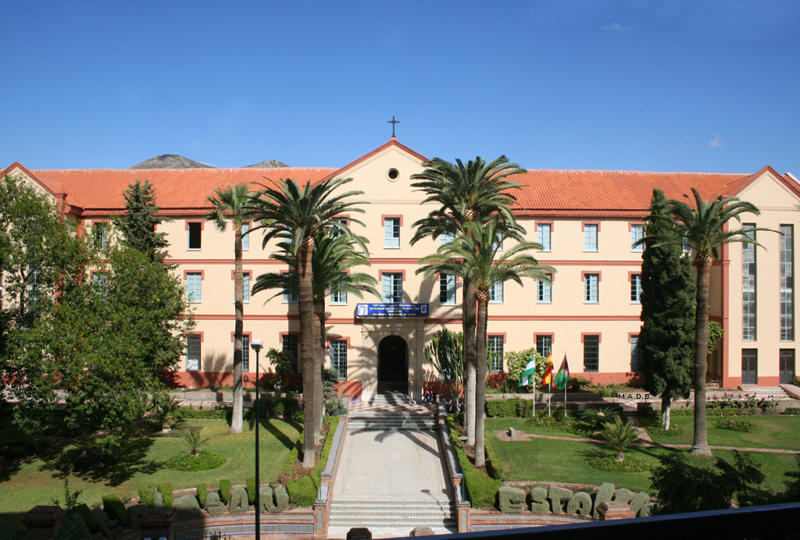
- Façade of the school building

Location
- Málaga, Andalusia; Spain
- Coordinates: 36.7213°N 4.3619°W

Information
- Type: Private primary and secondary school and vocational training centre
- Religious affiliation: Catholic
- Denomination: Jesuit
- Patron saint: Stanislaus Kostka
- Established: 1882; 144 years ago
- Staff: 115
- Gender: Co-educational
- Enrollment: 1,800
- Publication: Forja
- Website: www.fundacionloyola.es/sanestanislao

St. Stanislaus Kostka College (Spanish: Colegio San Estanislao de Kostka) is a private Catholic primary and secondary school and vocational training centre, located in the neighborhood of El Palo in the East District of Málaga, in the autonomous community of Andalusia, Spain. The school was founded by the Society of Jesus in 1882.

== Notable alumni ==
- Manuel Altolaguirre
- José Ortega y Gasset
- José María Souvirón
- José Moreno Villa

== See also ==
- Catholic Church in Spain
- Education in Spain
- List of Jesuit schools
