= Margarita Ferreras =

- Born: María Margarita Ferreras Lorenzo; 26 February 1900; Alcañices, Spain
- Died: 19 November 1964 (aged 64); Palencia, Spain
- Education: Residencia de Señoritas
- Occupations: Writer, poet

María Margarita Ferreras Lorenzo (1900–1964) was a Spanish writer and poet of the Generation of '27.

== Biography ==
Margarita Ferreras was born in Alcañices on 26 February 1900, to Abelisa Lorenzo García, a native of Canfranc, and Francisco Ferreras Toro, a native of Alcañices. Her father was treasury controller of the Province of Palencia. Her uncle was José Ferreras Toro, journalist, lawyer, and politician of the Constitutional Party.

She earned a school honors diploma in 1878. When her father died, the family moved to Madrid, where she became involved with cultural figures. The writer Álvaro Retana dedicated his work Ninfas y sátiros. Escenas pintorescas de Madrid de noche to Ferreras, remembering her as one of his first girlfriends. She aspired to star in Federico García Lorca's play The Love of Don Perlimplín and Belisa in the Garden, but her role went to the writer and actress Magda Donato.

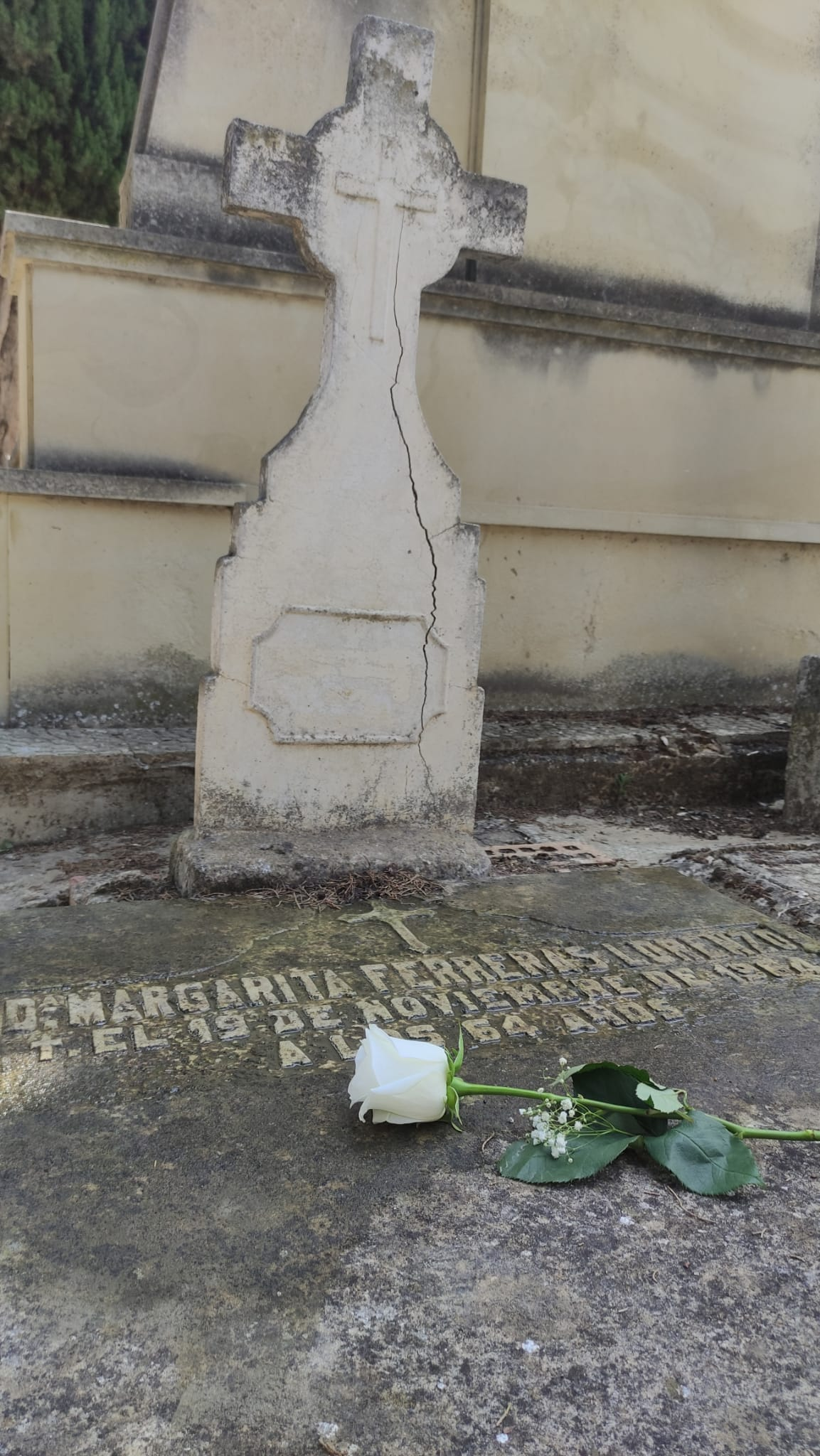
Ferreras's grave in the municipal cemetery of Palencia

Ferreras attended the Residencia de Señoritas in Madrid, and frequented the Lyceum Club Femenino. She was also a member of the Ateneo de Madrid. Known in literary circles, she participated in numerous events, such as the reading of works by Latin American poets, including Juana de Ibarbourou, in the tribute paid to the Uruguayan poet Juan Zorrilla de San Martín in March 1932. She also published in magazines such as Proa.

In the early 1930s, after publishing her book Pez en la tierra, Ferreras disappeared from public life. She was briefly admitted to a sanatorium due to nervous problems, and was diagnosed with "exogenous psychosis". She maintained correspondence with Miguel de Unamuno and Maria de Maeztu, among others. In some letters, she asked her lover, Prince Ferdinand of Bavaria, for money. The writer Manuel Altolaguirre recalled in his memoir El caballo griego: reflexiones y recuerdos (1927–1958) that he met Ferreras in Valencia during the Spanish Civil War, "with her reason lost".

She resided in Murcia in 1939. After the Civil War, she returned to Madrid for a time, later moving to Zamora. Ferreras died in Palencia on 19 November 1964, and is buried in the Nuestra Señora de los Ángeles municipal cemetery.

== Work ==
Pez en la tierra (Fish on Land) was her only book. Published in 1932, 250 copies of it were printed on linen paper on the press of Concha Méndez and Manuel Altolaguirre. Ferreras dedicated it to Juan Ramón Jiménez, and it was prefaced by Benjamín Jarnés. The book begins with a quote from Saint John of the Cross. It is divided into four sections, beginning with love poems, followed by a series of landscapes dedicated to José Ortega y Gasset, two romances in the style of García Lorca, and ends with a series of poems titled "Sur", which evoke the paintings of Julio Romero de Torres.

The book met with great critical success, with favorable reviews from newspapers such as ABC, Heraldo de Madrid, La Libertad, and Luz, placing Ferreras among the ranks of prominent poetic figures of the day.

== Recognition ==
In 2010, Pepa Merlo published an anthology of women poets from the Generation of '27, titled Pez en la tierra in reference to Ferreras's book.

One of her romances, "Por la verde, verde oliva", was set to music by the singer Sheila Blanco as part of the project Cantando a las poetas del 27.

In October 2022, her work was included in the exhibition Las Sinsombrero at the Fernán Gómez Centro Cultural de la Villa in Madrid.

On 18 November 2023, a floral tribute and poetry reading were held at her gravesite, organized by the teacher and writer Dolores Fidalgo and the Círculo Literario Margarita Ferreras de Alcañices.
