= José Bello =

Spanish writer (1904–2008)

José "Pepín" Bello Lasierra (13 May 1904 – 11 January 2008) was a Spanish intellectual and writer.

Bello, born in Huesca, Aragon, was the son of engineer Severino Bello Poëysuan. His parents were friends with notable Spanish intellectuals such as Joaquin Costa, Santiago Ramón y Cajal, and Francisco Giner de los Rios. At the age of eleven, he participated in the Madrid artist promotion "Residencia de Estudiantes de Madrid" where he met Salvador Dalí, Luis Buñuel, Federico García Lorca, and Rafael Alberti.

Bello, who studied medicine, was a profound influence on his creative contemporaries. Even though some of his paintings, which he called "Artists Without Deeds", were published, he was known mainly as the organizer of art events. He also managed a hydropower plant in the province of Huesca, operated a tannery in Burgos, and owned a drive-in theatre in Madrid. However, none of these business ventures were ultimately successful.

Bello died in his sleep in Madrid at the age of 103. He was regarded as the last survivor of the "Generation of '27" and the only member to survive into the 21st Century, but Francisco Ayala, who died in 2009, later came to be regarded as the last surviving member of the generation.
