= Katherine R. Whitmore =

Katherine R. Whitmore (née Katherine Prue Reding) (Kansas, 1897-1984) was a Spanish literature professor at Smith College. She majored in Spanish language and literature at the University of Kansas, and received her doctorate from Berkeley. She taught at Westhampton College in Richmond and, from 1930 on, at Smith College. She married Brewer Whitmore, another professor at Smith, in 1939.

Whitmore spent the summer of 1932 and the 1934-1935 academic year in Madrid, where she met poet Pedro Salinas, who fell in love with her. The relationship was the inspiration of Salinas' La voz a ti debida (1934), Razón de amor (1936), and Largo lamento (1939). Salinas' love letters to Whitmore from 1932 to 1947, kept at Houghton Library in Harvard University, were published in 2002 as Cartas a Katherine.

Whitmore specialized in Generation of '27 literature, which means that she was required to teach the poetry written for her to her students. She wrote several books, including The Generation of 1898 in Spain as Seen Through Its Fictional Hero (1936), and Handbook of Intermediate Spanish (1942).
