= Tejero =

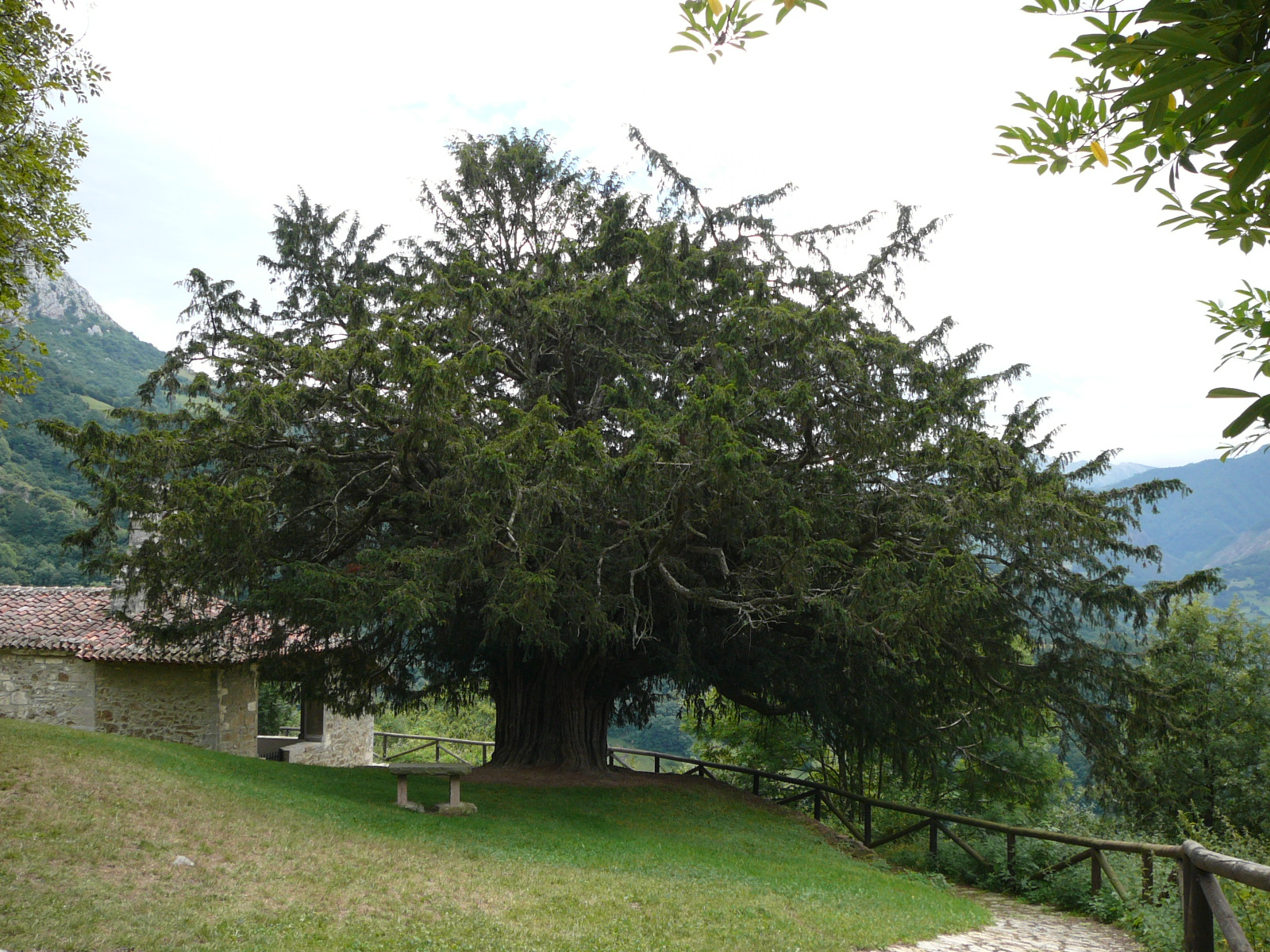
- A common yew tree
- Pronunciation: Spanish: [t̪eˈxe.ɾo]
- Language: Spanish

Origin
- Language: Portuguese
- Origin: Teixeiro/Teixeira
- Derivation: From teixo 'yew'
- Meaning: 'Place of the yew trees'
- Region of origin: Iberian Peninsula

Tejero is a Spanish toponymic surname, originating from the Portuguese surname Teixeiro/Teixeira, meaning 'place of the yew trees'. Notable people with the surname include:

- Álvaro Tejero (born 1996), Spanish footballer
- Antonio Tejero (1932–2026), Spanish lieutenant colonel of the Guardia Civil
- Delhy Tejero (1904–1968), Spanish painter
- Fernando Tejero (born 1967), Spanish actor
