= Sara Barquinero =

Spanish writer and philosopher (born 1994)

- Born: Sara Barquinero del Toro; 1994 (age 31–32); Zaragoza, Spain
- Education: University of Zaragoza; Complutense University of Madrid
- Occupations: Writer; philosopher

Sara Barquinero del Toro (born 1994) is a Spanish writer and philosopher whose books include the novella Terminal (2020) and the novels Estaré sola y sin fiesta (2021), Los escorpiones (2024) and La chica más lista que conozco (2026). Composed of five interlinked novels about conspiracy theories, Los escorpiones drew both praise and negative reviews in the Spanish press.

== Early life and education ==
Sara Barquinero del Toro was born in Zaragoza in 1994; she graduated in Philosophy from the University of Zaragoza with the extraordinary end-of-degree prize and completed a master's degree in Advanced Studies in Philosophy at the Complutense University of Madrid. She later completed a doctorate at the Complutense with a thesis on the concept of the sublime in Kant.

== Career ==
=== Early work ===
In 2018 Barquinero received a creative grant at the Residencia de Estudiantes in Madrid, where she wrote Terminal; the novella was published by Milenio in 2020.

Her next book, Estaré sola y sin fiesta, was published by Lumen in September 2021 and follows a journey to identify the unknown author of a personal diary. In a review for Contrapunto, Clara Pablo Ruano argued that the unnamed narrator's investigation of the diary she finds after an aunt's funeral becomes a means of avoiding her own life, and read the novel as a portrait of millennial disillusionment. An English-language excerpt from the novel, translated by Iona Macintyre, appeared in The Spanish Riveter in 2023.

=== Los escorpiones ===
Published by Lumen in 2024, Los escorpiones follows Sara, Thomas and Manuel as their stories and fears gradually converge; Marta Marne praised Barquinero's treatment of loneliness, pain and altered states of consciousness in her review for El Periódico. In Babelia, Nadal Suau described a conspiracy running from proto-fascist Italy in 1922 to 2025 and praised the 816-page novel's changes in narrative model, setting and voice, as well as its controlled prose.

The book assembles five novels and three interludes; in El Confidencial's Mala Fama column, the reviewer called the whole work juvenile and superficial, found Sara and Thomas hard to distinguish, but praised the campus section "Tarde para nada".

Barquinero was selected for a literature residency at the Real Academia de España en Roma for 2024-2025.

=== La chica más lista que conozco ===
Reviewing La chica más lista que conozco (Lumen, 2026) in La Vanguardia, Begoña Gómez Urzaiz described a Bildungsroman in which Alicia leaves Valladolid to study Philosophy at a fictional Madrid university, becomes involved with her professor Juan Comala and negotiates rivalries with other women; she praised the novel's treatment of academic writing and university politics. Writing for ABC, José María Pozuelo Yvancos argued that the philosophical references remain on the surface and that the novel does not resolve the relationship between its intellectual ambitions and its plots of love and university intrigue.

== Awards ==
Barquinero received the Fundación Unir Valores Universales essay prize in 2016, the Virginia Woolf prize for English-language short fiction in 2017, the IAJ prize for artistic and technological creation in literature in 2018 and the Voces Nuevas poetry prize from Ediciones Torremozas in 2019. In January 2025 the Madrid Booksellers Association named Los escorpiones its fiction book of the year; the jury cited its treatment of suicide, post-truth, conspiracy theories, mental health and loneliness.
