= Maruja Mallo =

Spanish artist; surrealist painter (1902–1995)

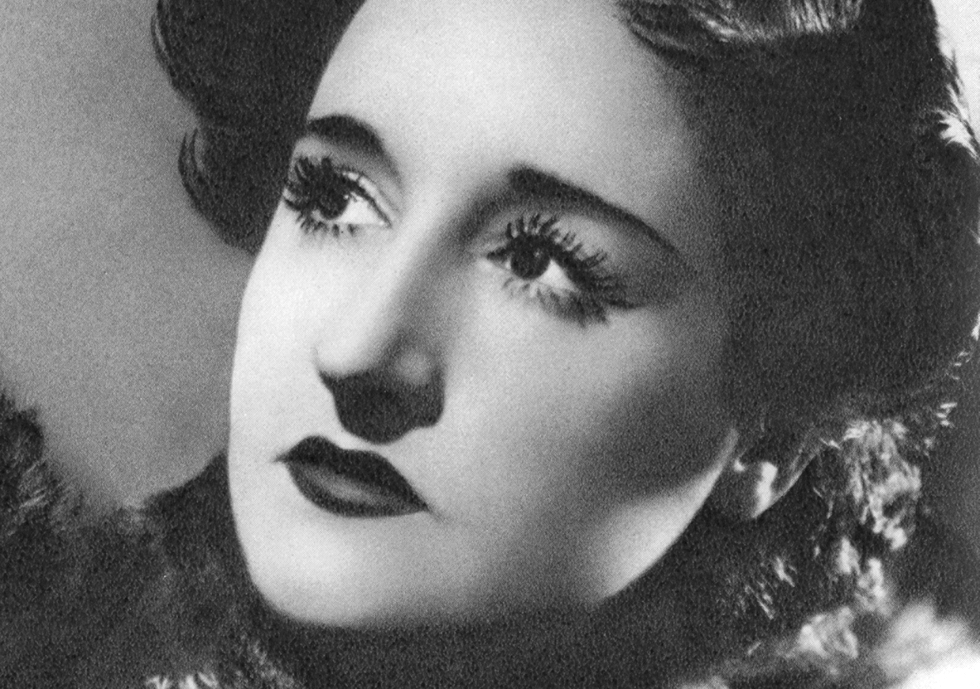
- Born: Ana María Gómez González; Viveiro, Spain
- Died: 6 February 1995 (aged 93); Madrid, Spain
- Education: School of Arts and Crafts of Avilés (before 1922); Royal Academy of Fine Arts of San Fernando (from 1922); Free Academy of Art (from 1922)
- Known for: Painting
- Movement: Spanish avant-garde Surrealism

Maruja Mallo (born Ana María Gómez González; 5 January 1902 – 6 February 1995) was a Spanish surrealist painter. She is considered an artist of the Generation of 1927 within the Spanish avant-garde movement.

== Biography ==
Mallo was the fourth daughter of fourteen children born to Justo Gómez Mallo (Customs Corps Official and native of Madrid) and María del Pilar González Lorenzo, born in Viveiro, Spain, on 5 January 1902. She is the older sister of sculptor Cristino Mallo (born in Tui in 1905).

== Early years ==
When she was a young girl, Mallo would alternate between living with parents and her aunt (Juliana Lastres Carrer) and uncle (Ramiro Gonzalez Lorenzo). While living with her aunt and uncle at a young age, she felt inspired to create and express herself through artwork. After the birth of one of her brothers, the family moved to Avilés, where they remained from 1913 to 1922.

In 1922 at age 20, Mallo's family moved to Madrid. There, she began to study at the San Fernando Royal Academy of Fine Arts, where she stayed until 1926. In Madrid she met artists, writers, and scientists from the Spanish Generation ’27 like Salvador Dalí, Concha Méndez, Ernesto Giménez Caballero, Gregorio Prieto, Federico García Lorca, Margarita Manso, Luis Buñuel, María Zambrano, and Rafael Alberti, with whom she maintained a relationship until he met María Teresa León. She went on to form a group of women from the Generation of ’27 known as “Las Sinsombrero” (English: those without hats). In particular, she was friends with Concha Méndez and Josefina Canarias.

During the 1920s, Mallo also worked on numerous literary publications and produced several books. Author Ortega y Gasset recognized her paintings in 1928 and organized her first exhibit in Revista de Occidente, which was very successful, praised for its originality and freshness. It displayed ten oil paintings representing towns full of sun, bullfighters and women from Madrid, as well as colored prints of machinery, sports, and cinema from the beginning of the century. The exhibit was a starting point from which Mallo was judged for her work and not her gender. During this time, Mallo's paintings followed the theme of new objectivity or magic realism, theorized by Franz Roh in his book Magic Realism in 1925.

According to biographer Shirley Mangini, "Although historians of Spanish avant-garde art locate the origins of the movement in the activities of Salvador Dalí, Luis Buñuel, Federico García Lorca, and another student at the Residencia, José Bello, Mallo's artistic vision was an important catalyst in the Spanish avant-garde movement." Her paintings of the 1920s represent urban entertainments and sports, composed in complex overlapping arrangements that express the dynamism of modern life. These works, such as La Verbena (The Festival) of 1927, combine sharply defined, smoothly modeled forms with bright colors.

== The 1930s and the Second Spanish Republic ==
Mallo's work became more surrealistic in the early 1930s, including geometric visual language and themes that ranged from fruits to agricultural structures as well as creating ceramic disks with themes of fish and bulls. Mallo collaborated intensely with Rafael Alberti starting in 1931. In those years she painted the series Cloacas (Sewers) y Campanarios (Belfries).

Her first exhibit in Paris took place in the Pierre Loeb Gallery in 1932. There she began her surrealist stage.

She returned to Madrid in 1933 and actively participated in the Society of Iberian Artists. This was the beginning of a period in which Mallo's interests emphasized geometric order and nature's intricacies.

In that same year, Mallo, committed to the Second Spanish Republic, started teaching as a drawing professor at the Institute of Arévalo, in the School Institute of Madrid, and at the Ceramics School of Madrid, for which she designed a series of dishes that no longer exist, and where she learned mathematic and geometric concepts to use in ceramics.

She frequently spent time with Miguel Hernández, with whom she maintained a romantic relationship. They also planned the drama Los hijos de la piedra (The sons and the stone) together, which was inspired by the events of Casas Viejas. From 1936, she began her constructive age, while still exhibiting with surrealist painters in London and Barcelona. She participated as a teacher in the Pedagogical Missions, which brought her closer to her homeland, Galicia, which after a few months was surprised by the Spanish Civil War.

In May 1936 her third individual exhibit took place, organized by ADLAN in the Center of Studies and Information of the Construction in the Career of Saint Jerónimo of Madrid with a series of sixteen paintings from Cloacas y Campanarios, the series of twelve works from Arquitecturas minerales y vegetales (Mineral and vegetable architectures), and sixteen drawings from Instrucciones rurales (Rural instructions), which was published in 1949 in the Clan Library with a prologue from Jean Cassou. She then had an exhibit with Ángel Planells of international surrealism in London's New Burlington Galleries.

With the outbreak of the Spanish Civil War in 1936, Mallo fled to Portugal. All of her ceramic work from this time was destroyed in the war. Later, Gabriela Mistral, who at the time was ambassador of Chile in Portugal, helped Mallo move to Buenos Aires, where she received an invitation by the Friends of Art Association to give a series of conferences about a popular theme in Spanish art, “Historical process in the way of the plastic arts,” in Montevideo and later in Buenos Aires.

== Exile ==
When the Spanish Civil War erupted, Mallo went into exile in Argentina. When Mallo went into exile, her male partners in the creation of Spanish Avant-Garde Art, Vanguardist parties and Surrealist happenings began to boycott her, Occasioning her exclusion from the History of the Spanish Avant-Garde. Until recent years Mallo was rarely mentioned in Spanish Texts on Art and Cultural History. She was remembered for her affairs and her otherwise scandalous behavior such as winning a "Blasphemy Contest" and riding into church on a bicycle during mass than for her artist work. She was often simply labeled a "Mascot" or "Muse" of the generation of 27. Mangini, Shirley (2006). ""From the Atlantic to the Pacific: Maruja Mallo in Exile"". Studies in 20th & 21st Century Literature. 30. doi:10.4148/2334-4415.1616. In Argentina, Mallo quickly received acknowledgement through her collaboration with the avant-garde magazine Sur, in which Borges also participated. This was an age in her life that she dedicated to travel, living between Uruguay and Buenos Aires to design, paint, and ultimately to create. She also held exhibits in Paris, Brazil and New York City. Her first work there continued the path she initiated with Sorpresa del trigo (Wheat surprise) with works like Arquitectura humana (Human Architecture), Canto de espigas (Wheat ears), and Mensaje del mar (Message from the Sea). In the series Las Máscaras (The Masks), Mallo was directly inspired by the syncretic cults of the Americas.

She found herself in this moment with her friend Alfonso Reyes, ambassador to Mexico in Argentina, with whom she would remain until 1938, the year in which she returned to Mexico. On 2 August 1938, Federico García Lorca’s Cantata en la tumba (Cantata in the tomb) premiered with Alfonso Reyes and music by Jaume Pahissa and scenography by Mallo.

In 1939 she traveled to Santiago, Chile, where she was invited to speak in several conferences. From her time in Buenos Aires, the Museum of Drawing and Illustration now treasures a collection of two of Mallo's temperas on paper representing half-real and half-fantastical animals.

At 36, she published the book Lo popular en la plástica española a través de mi obra (What is popular in Spanish art because of my work) (1939) and began to paint portraits of women, whose style is a precursor to pop art in the United States.

In 1942 the book Maruja Mallo was published with a prologue by Ramón Gómez de la Serna. Between 1945 and 1957, Mallo had a dark period; her public appearances and exhibits were rarer. In 1945, she went to Chile and traveled along the Viña del Mar and the Isla de Pascua (Easter Island), together with Pablo Neruda, looking for inspiration for a request for a mural for a theater in Los Angeles from Buenos Aires, which was inaugurated in October the same year. On 11 October 1948, Mallo left Argentina and moved to New York. In March 1950 she exhibited in the Galerie Silvangi in Paris and, in 1959, in the Bonino gallery in Buenos Aires. Finally, she traveled from New York to Madrid to return to Spain in 1962, after 25 years of exile.

== Return to Spain ==
In October 1962, Mallo completed an exhibit in the Mediterranean gallery. In Madrid in the 1980s, Mallo painted many amazing works in her geometric style, like Acróbatas (Acrobats) and Protozoarios (Protozoa).

It was not until recently that Mallo was even slightly mentioned in Spanish texts on art and cultural history. Instead of being acknowledged for her artistic work, during exile she was remembered for instances in her life that did not matter: Affairs, scandalous behavior, and riding into church on a bicycle during mass. However, eventually the respect her work was given in Argentina followed into Spain, and she was even asked to speak about her own art, and the evolution of western art. It is said that "Mallo [would] shock her contemporaries with her avant-garde art, she would cause distress among them because she refused to conform to any of the rules the patriarchy attempted to impose on women."

6 February 1995, Mallo died in Madrid at 93 years old.

== Art influence ==
In a biography by Shirley Mangini, the author notes that "it is significant that Mallo's early memories were of street fairs, since they are the subject of her first major series of paintings, Las Verbenas. "Mallo's art was influenced by when she first saw the Pacific Ocean. The era of intense political, social, cultural and economic change in which Mallo grew up also inspired her artwork.It caused her to display a new language that celebrates the female body and sexuality. Her goal was to present women as active members of society and not just muses of sexuality, beauty, and objects. Mallo also began using gender references in her paintings as she painted androgynous figures and large mythical females that signaled her freedom from the male-dominated artistic world of Madrid.

== Awards and recognition ==
In 1979, Mallo began her pictorial period with Los moradores del vacio (The dwellers of the void). She was already 77, but still had the freshness and vitality that was present in all of her life. In the 1980s she was offered various exhibits and awards:

- The Medal of Gold for honor in the Fine Arts, known as Minister of Culture in 1982
- The Award for Plastic Arts in Madrid, 1982
- In 1990 she received the gold medal for Community in Madrid and in 1991 the Galician Medal
- In 1992, at 90 years old, one of her exhibits was celebrated in the Guillermo de Osma de Madrid gallery, which showed, for the first time, the series of paintings from her exile in America
- In 1993 a retrospective exhibit was held in Santiago de Compostela that inaugurated the new Gallego Center for Contemporary Art. Later, the exhibit was moved to the Buenos Aires Fine Arts Museum.
- In 2010 the House of Vigo Arts organized an anthological exhibit in conjunction with the San Fernando Academy of Fine Arts
- For the first time since 1948, Mallo's work was exhibited in New York as Maruja Mallo: Paintings 1926- 1952 in 2018 from 26 September – 1 December at Ortuzar Projects project space in Tribeca, New York.
- Mallo's artwork can be found at the Museo Nacional Centro De Arte Reina Sofia which is Spain's national museum of 20th-century art.

== Legacy ==
In Viveiro, Mallo's hometown, a permanent museum concentrated on the studies of her work was established. Also, an avenue was named after her in the Madrid district of Hortaleza. Streets with Mallo's name can also be found in cities like Almería, Estepona, Mérida, Boadilla del Monte, Guadalajara, and the Castle of San Juan.

In 2017, the Gallegas Day of the Arts was dedicated to Mallo, granted by the Royal Gallegan Academy of Fine Arts.

== Works ==
- La verbena (The Fair) (1927)
- La kermesse (The Fair) ( (1928)
- Canto de las espigas (Song of the ears) (1929)
- La huella (The footprint) (1929)
- Antro de Fosiles (Fossil Club) (1930)
- Tierra y excrementos (Earth and feces) (1932)
- Sorpresa en el trigo (Wheat surprise) (1936)
- Figuras (Figures) (1937)
- Cabeza de mujer (Woman's head) (1941)
- Máscaras (Masks) (1942)
- Serie Las naturalezas vivas (Natural life series) (1942)
- El racimo de uvas (The cluster of grapes) (1944)
- Oro (Gold) (1951)
- Agol (1969)
- Geonauta (Geonaut) (1975)
- Selvatro (Jungle) (1979)
- Concorde (Concord) (1979)
- Máscara tres-veinte (Mask three-twenty) (1979)
- Airagu (1979)
- Acróbatas macro y microcosmos (Macro and microcosm acrobats) (1981)
- Acróbatas (Acrobats) (1981)
- Protozaorios (Protozoa) (1981)
- Panteo (Pantheon) (1982)
- Acróbata (Acrobat) (1982)
- Protoesquema (Protoschema) (1982)
- Razas (Races) (1982)
- Viajeros del éter (Aether Travelers) (1982)
