= Alfonso Ponce de León =

Spanish painter

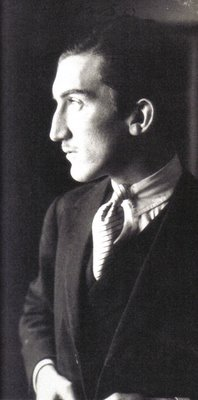
- Born: Alfonso Ponce de León y Cabello; 10 September 1906; Málaga, Spain
- Died: 29 September 1936 (aged 30); Madrid, Spain
- Cause of death: Execution by firing squad
- Education: Real Academia de Bellas Artes de San Fernando
- Occupations: Painter; propagandist
- Political party: Falange Española de las JONS
- Movement: Magical realism

Alfonso Ponce de León y Cabello (10 September 1906 – 29 September 1936) was a Spanish painter and propagandist. He was the son of jurist Juan Ponce de León y Encina. He was also associated with Federico García Lorca's theater group, La Barraca, as a scene painter. In 2001 the Reina Sofía curated a retrospective exhibition of his work. He was married to fellow painter Margarita Manso. A member of Falange (helming the organization's propaganda apparatus) since circa 1935, he was arrested and executed by Republican paramilitaries in 1936 during the Spanish Civil War. His most famous work, Autorretrato (accidente) is housed in the Reina Sofia's permanent collection.

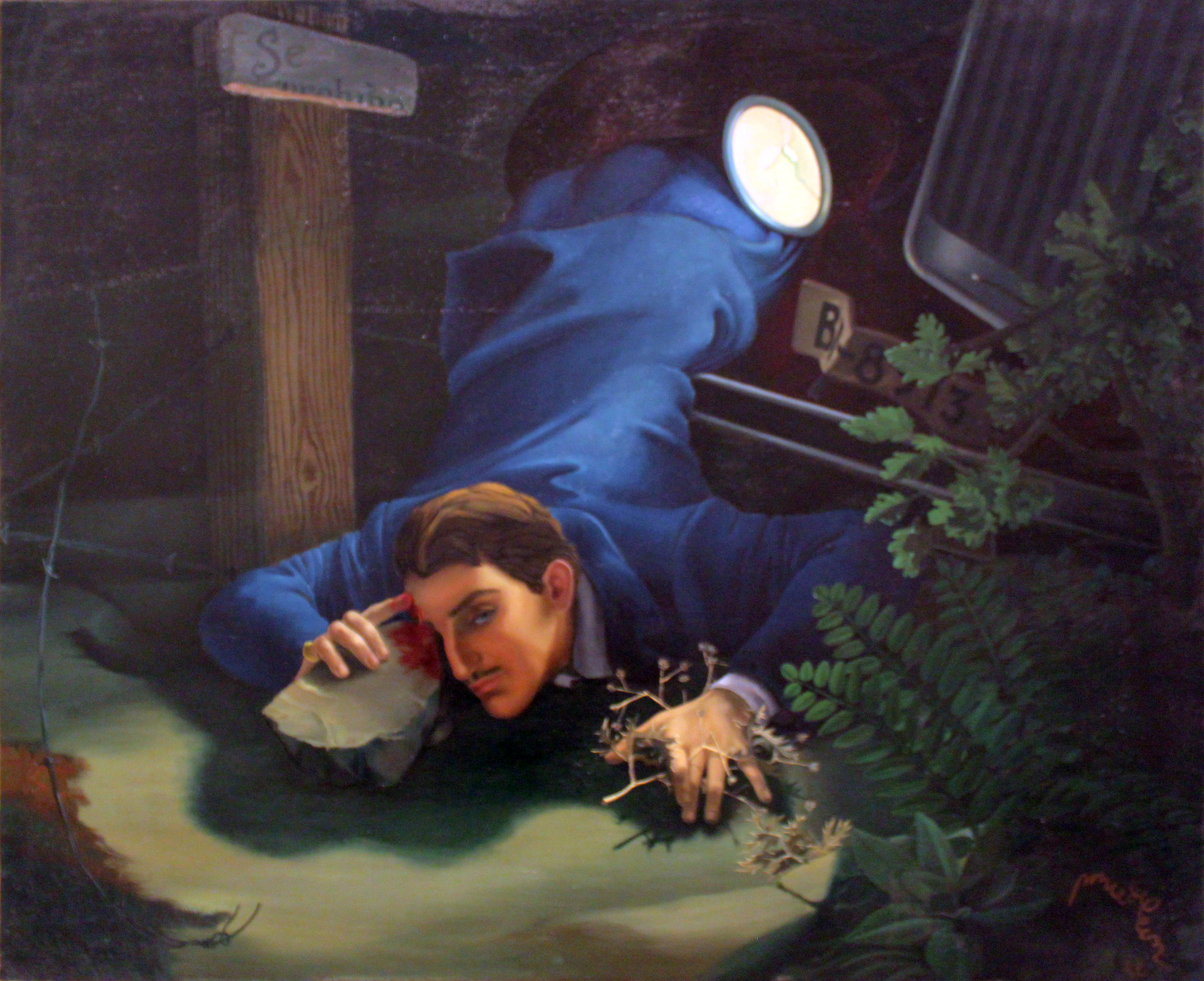
Autorretrato (accidente), 1936
