= Pedro Salinas =

Spanish poet

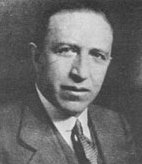
- Born: 27 November 1891; Madrid, Spain
- Died: 4 December 1951 (aged 60); Boston, Massachusetts, U.S.
- Resting place: Santa Maria Magdalena de Pazzis Cemetery in San Juan
- Spouse: Margarita Bonmatí
- Children: 2

Pedro Salinas y Serrano (27 November 1891 – 4 December 1951) was a Spanish poet, a member of the Generation of '27, as well as a university teacher, scholar and literary critic. In 1937, he delivered the Turnbull lectures at Johns Hopkins University. These were later published under the title Reality and the Poet in Spanish Poetry.

== Biography ==
He was born in Madrid in the Calle de Toledo, 1891, in a house very close to the San Isidro church/cathedral. Salinas lived his early years in the heart of the city and went to school first in the Colegio Hispano-Francés and then in the Instituto Nacional de Segunda Enseñanza, both close by the church. His father, a cloth-merchant, died in 1899. He began to study law at the Universidad Central in 1908 and in 1910 started to study history concurrently. He graduated successfully in both courses in 1913. During his undergraduate years, he began to write and publish poems in small circulation journals such as Prometeo. In 1914 he became the Spanish lector at the Collège de Sorbonne in the University of Paris until 1917, when he received his doctorate. He had married Margarita Bonmatí, a Spanish girl of Algerian descent whom he had met on his summer holidays in Santa Pola, Alicante, in December 1915. She had been born in 1884. They had two children, Soledad (always referred to as Solita) born in 1920 and Jaime born in 1925. His academic life seemed to act as a model for his slightly younger contemporary Jorge Guillén with whom he struck up a friendship in 1920.

In 1918 he was appointed Professor of Spanish Language and Literature at the University of Seville and he held the post until 1928, although he spent 1922–23 as lector at the University of Cambridge. One of his students in Seville was Luis Cernuda in the academic year 1919–20, to whom he gave special encouragement. He urged him to read modern French literature, in particular André Gide and the poetry of Baudelaire, Mallarmé and Rimbaud. He continued to publish poems in magazines such as España and La Pluma. In vacations, he spent time as a lecturer at the Residencia de Estudiantes, where he got to know the leading lights of his generation, such as García Lorca and Rafael Alberti. In April 1926, he was present at the gathering in Madrid where the first plans to celebrate the tercentenary of Góngora's death were laid. Salinas was to edit the volume devoted to the sonnets: a project that never came to fruition. While at Cambridge, his translation of the first two volumes and part of the third of Marcel Proust's In Search of Lost Time into Spanish was published. And in 1925, his modernised version of El Poema de Mío Cid was published by Revista de Occidente.

In 1928 he became a researcher at the Centro de Estudios Históricos in Madrid before becoming director of studies for foreigners at the University of Madrid. In 1930, he became a professor of Spanish literature at Madrid and doubled up as originator, organiser and secretary-general of the International Summer School of Santander between 1933 and 1936. This school was set up to accommodate 200 Spanish students (approximately 4 from each of the established universities in Spain) and an international teaching staff.

On 8 March 1933, he was present at the premiere in Madrid of García Lorca's play Bodas de sangre. In August 1933, he was able to host performances at the Magdalena Palace in Santander by the travelling theatre company La Barraca that Lorca led. On 20 April 1936, he attended the launch party in Madrid for Luis Cernuda's new collection La realidad y el deseo. and on 12 July he was present at a party in Madrid that took place just before García Lorca departed to Granada for the last time before his murder. It was there that Lorca read his new play La casa de Bernarda Alba for the last time.

On 31 August 1936, shortly after the beginning of the Spanish Civil War, he moved to the US, to take up the position of the Mary Whiton Calkins professor at Wellesley College, Mass., which he held until 1937. In the spring of 1937, he delivered a series of lectures as the Turnbull Professor at Johns Hopkins University, Baltimore, on Poet and Reality in Spanish Literature (published 1940). In the summer of that year (and in many subsequent years), he taught in the Spanish faculty of Middlebury College, Vermont and was awarded a doctorate honoris causa. In May 1939, he participated in a PEN International conference in New York, representing the writers of the (Second) Spanish Republic.

He had been dividing his time between the faculties of Wellesley, Middlebury, and Johns Hopkins but in 1940 he took up a permanent post at Johns Hopkins where he remained for the rest of his life, including long spells of travel in South America and a period of 3 years at the University of Puerto Rico. In the summer of 1949 he returned to Europe for the last time to visit Italy and France and to work for UNESCO. At the beginning of 1951 he began to exhibit signs of ill-health, which turned out to be an incurable cancer. He died on 4 December 1951. At his request he was buried in Santa Maria Magdalena de Pazzis Cemetery in San Juan.

Salinas was the father-in-law of Spanish historian and writer Juan Marichal. Marichal would later publish Salinas' complete works, Three Voices of Pedro Salinas, which was released in 1976. His daughter edited his poetry and incorporated an introduction by his old friend Jorge Guillén.

== Poetry ==
=== Stylistic characteristics ===
His poetry falls naturally into three periods: the first three books, the love poetry, and the poetry of exile. However, there are more continuities between these phases than such an analysis would suggest. In his published Johns Hopkins lectures he remarked:

Poetry always operates on reality. The poet places himself before reality like a human being before light, in order to create something else, a shadow. The shadow is the result of the interposition of a body between light and some other substance. The poet adds shadows to the world, bright and luminous shadows like new lights. All poetry operates on one reality for the sake of creating another.

There is a crucial difference between the world of everyday appearance and the deeper reality that the poet sees and tries to convey to his readers. Salinas writes as if he is the first person to see a particular object or feel a certain emotion and he tries to convey to the reader this sense of the wonder hidden behind familiar, banal things.

Salinas has often been compared with Guillén. To some extent this is because they were good friends and slightly older than most of the other leading members of their generation, as well as following similar career-paths, but they also seemed to share a similar approach to poetry. Their poems often have a rarefied quality and tend not to deal with "particulars", readily identifiable people and places. Nevertheless, they did differ in many respects as exemplified by the titles they gave to their published lectures on Spanish poetry. At Johns Hopkins, Salinas published a collection called Reality and the Poet in Spanish Poetry, whereas Guillén's Norton lectures were called Language and Poetry. Both devoted single lectures to Góngora and San Juan de la Cruz and the comparisons between them are instructive. Salinas seems to want to show us the poetic reality behind or beyond appearances, to educate us into how to see whereas Guillén gives us an account of the thoughts and sense-impressions going through his own mind: the reader is a viewer of this process not a participant in it. Vicente Aleixandre recalled visiting Salinas and finding him at his desk with his daughter on one knee and his son on the other and stretching out a hand clutching a pen to shake hands with his visitor. Although he was also devoted to his family, Guillén probably worked in a secluded study.

=== First phase ===
==== Presagios ====
It was at the relatively late age of 32 that Salinas published his first collection in 1923 – both Guillén, at the age of 35, and he were the oldest of the generation to get collections published. It seems that Juan Ramón Jiménez did the main editorial work - Salinas showed him a collection of 50 poems and it was Jiménez who organised them, placing three sonnets to form a central axis as well as adding an introductory essay. The title can be translated as presages, omens, prophesies and it suggests why this book is interesting. Most of the characteristics of the poet's mature style are captured here: basically simple and colloquial language used to depict everyday things in surprising ways in order to bring out the appearance/reality duality. He tended not to use traditional Spanish verse-forms in his poetry but neither did he write free verse. There is usually some kind of assonance scheme or metrical pattern underpinning the whole. His poems also tend to be short – less than 20 lines long – and playful in tone. One of the longer poems in this collection of untitled poems is 31, which deals with the apparently independent life of the poet's shadow. Eventually, the fact that he cannot control it makes him commit "fratricide" by retreating indoors, to a shadow-free zone. In such poems, the influence of the Golden Age stylistic tendency conceptismo is apparent and this becomes more marked in future collections.

==== Seguro azar ====
This book gathers together poems written between 1924 and 1928. The title is hard to render in English – sure or certain chance – but it seems to allude to the poet's confidence or certainty that he will find random moments of beauty or wonder in everyday life. The title might also suggest a growing self-confidence inside the poet. The appearance/reality conflict is now increasingly illustrated by examples gathered from life in a modern metropolis.

A key poem is "Vocación". Its first stanza is almost a paraphrase of Guillén's view of poetry as a contemplation of something in the world – saying the right words brings reality alive. The central stanza shows that Salinas questions this approach, which seems to give the poet no role beyond that of a mere spectator. In the final stanza, he gives his own conception of poetry, in which he closes his eyes and sees how blurry and incomplete the observed world is until a poet comes along to supply what is lacking to make it something perfect.

In "Navecerrada, abril" and "35 bujías", Salinas uses a riddle technique which becomes a signature device in later collections. The actual subject of the poem is only identified at the end of the poem - a technique that could derive from conceptismo or maybe Mallarmé. In the former poem, it is easy to jump to the conclusion that this is a poem about a pair of lovers. Only in the final line is it made clear that the poet is addressing his poem to a car, which he has stopped for a moment to contemplate the view from a high mountain pass. In the latter, Salinas goes a step further and tries to restore a sense of wonder to an everyday object by translating it to a mythological or legendary world. He develops the conceit of the filament of an electric light as a princess locked in a glass prison, guarded by rays of sunshine. He can only free her at night, by pressing a switch. In "Quietud", he writes a poem about the challenge of the blank sheet of paper – a theme explored by Mallarmé, and by Cernuda as well. However, for Salinas, perfection can be achieved by a poem remaining incomplete.

"Nivel preferido" is a key poem for understanding Salinas's choice of subject-matter. He grew up in the capital city and is arguably more of an urban person than most of his generation, who tended to come from provincial capitals. His poems rarely feature landscapes and wide, open spaces: this is because such views have largely been catalogued so that anyone with a Baedeker or travel guide can interpret them. What Salinas likes are little unobserved details, which abound in uncatalogued urban scenes.

==== Fábula y signo ====
This collection appeared in 1931 and presents the culmination of this phase of Salinas's poetry – it is in effect a continuation and extension of themes and techniques found in Seguro azar. "La otra" is an intriguing poem about a girl who decides to commit suicide but not by poison, shooting or strangulation: instead, she lets her soul die. She continues to be photographed and mentioned in the gossip-columns and nobody notices that she is dead. This shows the development of a more serious tendency in Salinas to go with the playful way he had drawn on conceptismo in earlier works.

In "Lo nunca igual", it is possible to see again the essential difference between Salinas and Guillén. The latter, on waking up, welcomes the return of familiar things. Salinas, on the other hand, on returning to familiar surroundings, welcomes the novelty added by his absence: these are not the things he left behind but new discoveries, despite appearances.

This collection also includes one of his most anthologised poems, "Underwood girls". This is another of those riddle poems that mythologise the everyday. The "girls" are the keys of a typewriter awaiting the touch of an operator to awaken them from centuries of slumber.

=== Love poetry ===
His love poetry is generally considered to be the highest peak of his achievement as a poet. It was written between 1933 and 1939 and was published in La voz a ti debida (1933), and Razón de amor (1936). A third collection, Largo lamento, was not published during the poet's lifetime, only appearing in full in 1971. For many years, it was assumed that these poems were rhetorical exercises - poems that use the techniques and devices of his earlier poems but focused on an imaginary love affair. Among the people who knew him well at the time, Cernuda thought that they were playful exercises, not seeing any great significance in them. Guillén, on the other hand, takes them very seriously but gives no sign that they might have been based in reality, real feelings. He even quotes the view of the critic Leo Spitzer that this is love poetry where the beloved is a phenomenon created by the poet, whilst asserting that this point of view is fundamentally mistaken. However, in 2002, Enric Bou published a set of letters sent by Salinas to Katherine R. Whitmore between the years 1932–47. She taught Spanish at Smith College, Northampton, Mass. In 1932, she spent her summer vacation in Madrid, where she met Salinas and they fell in love. A few weeks later, she returned to Northampton. She returned to spend the academic year 1934–5 in Madrid where they picked up their affair. However, on learning that Salinas's wife had discovered what was happening and had tried to commit suicide, she broke off relations. A sporadic correspondence continued afterwards but she married another man and the affair was over. The very shortness of the affair, two summers and an academic year, perhaps explains why it seems to have gone unsuspected by his close friends. The intensity of his feelings, however, are captured in the letters and, above all, in these collections of poetry. Guillén seems to have been the person who tracked down what had happened.

==== La voz a ti debida ====
This book has the sub-title Poema and it is indeed conceived as a single poem whose various episodes do not have individual titles or numbers. It takes its title from the third Eclogue of Garcilaso de la Vega. An ever new "I" eagerly pursues an ever new "you" but there is always something that eludes him. The devices of conceptismo, such as paradox and conceits, are drawn upon again perhaps in more complex ways than before because he is dealing with abstract concepts such as love. The language, however, remains very simple.

In the section "Por qué tienes nombre tú…" the poet shows his frustration at the inadequacy of words to capture the wonder he finds in the things they designate. If his lover did not have a name then he would feel that he was creating her.

In "Tú no las puedes ver…" he uses the riddle technique, holding back the banal word "tears" to the end to emphasise its inability to capture all the thoughts that have gone through his mind on seeing them and kissing them.

==== Razón de amor ====
This book takes its title from a poem from the early 13th century and falls into two sections. The first consists of untitled and unnumbered poems like those of La voz a ti debida; the second comprises eight long poems with individual titles. The subject-matter and approach is much the same as in the earlier collection but there is more assurance in the handling of the poetry. Again there is an emphasis on the inability of language to convey what the poet feels. "Beso será" develops the conceit that things that the lovers see and feel whilst they are apart, the "appearances" of trees, breezes, leaves etc., become the "reality" of the kiss when the lovers are reunited. They only become real when the lovers meet again.

==== Largo lamento ====
The poems that form this collection were written between 1936 and 1939. A selection from them had been published in 1957 under the title Volverse sombra y otras poemas. In the first edition of his Poesías completas that his daughter Solita brought out in 1971, she restored the original title and gathered together 21 poems. In the 1981 edition, she added a further 26 poems, considerably expanding the size of the collection. The manuscript, which existed almost entirely in typescript, was made up of 5 distinct groups of texts, 3 found in Gilman Hall at the Johns Hopkins campus and the other 2 amongst the poet's papers in his house in Newland Road, Baltimore. The state of the manuscripts varied between finished and properly typed up, finished by the poet but not properly typed up, and draft. Amongst the drafts, there were some that the editor felt were complete enough to merit publication.

Nevertheless, there are two distinct types of poems included in this collection - poems that seem like a continuation of the mood and style of Razón de amor and poems that seem to embody the title given to this collection: long lament. This title does not actually appear in any of the manuscripts: it only comes from letters to his Argentinian friend Guillermo de Torre and Jorge Guillén. The original conception of Largo lamento was seen by Guillén in 1938 but was subsequently put aside by the author, as was the continuation of Razón de amor.

=== Poetry of exile ===
==== El contemplado ====
Although this was published in 1946, the poems were inspired by the sea at Puerto Rico during his stay in 1943–44. It bears an epigraph from Guillen's 1945 edition of Cántico – again emphasising the strong links between the two men – on the subject of light being the best guide. The book also has a subtitle Tema con variaciones and the most noticeable aspect of these variations is the use of strict Spanish metrical forms such as silvas and romances. In Language and Poetry, Guillén says, "Even a Salinas…composed an occasional sonnet" but it is not until this work that he showed any sustained signs of interest in formal metrical structures. The vocabulary is more florid than in earlier works and there are even occasional uses of hyperbaton. These features are characteristic of the style of Góngora and lead the reader to wonder whether this is not his long-delayed contribution to the Tercentenary celebrations.

The collection shows signs of a new approach to the city and urban life that had been foreshadowed in a few poems such as "La otra" but which was outweighed by his fascination with incidental flashes of beauty and harmony. In "Variación XII" he sets up an opposition between the purity of the sea and the ugliness of the city of commerce. The city is described in terms reminiscent of Lorca's Poeta en Nueva York, which is a major change in Salinas's outlook.

==== Todo más claro ====
Published in 1949, this collection gathers poems written between 1937 and 1947. Although Salinas was never a political poet, in his American exile he saw the development of the machine-civilisation, enslaving its citizens to a world of commerce, figures and senseless advertising slogans – as in "Nocturno de los avisos". The last poem in the collection, "Cero", is a long lament expressing his horror and sadness that the pinnacle of scientific ingenuity, which should be a progressive force, has been to create something as destructive as the atomic bomb. The only consolation that he can find is revealed in "Lo inútil". Impractical, immaterial, unsought among the values of the modern world, doing no harm to others, "useless" poetry is what makes life worthwhile for him.

==== Confianza ====
These last poems were published in 1954, three years after his death, and suggest that the attitude of his previous two collections was only a passing phase. There is a return to the optimism that characterises most of his work. He reasserts his belief in the most enduring factors of life, not tied to any particular set of historical circumstances and therefore able to outlast them. The final poem is the one that was used to provide a title for the collection. It consists of a string of adverbial subjunctive clauses with the main subject continually suppressed – the implication being that it is poetry itself that will survive as long as certain things continue to happen or exist.

His work as a playwright is little-known in the English-speaking world.

== Poetry collections ==
- Presagio, Madrid, Índice, 1923.
- Seguro azar, Madrid, Revista de Occidente, 1929.
- Fábula y signo, Madrid, Plutarco, 1931.
- La voz a ti debida, Madrid, Signo, 1933.
- Razón de amor, Madrid, Ediciones del Árbol; Cruz y Raya (revista), 1936.
- Error de cálculo, México, Imp. Miguel N. Lira, 1938.
- Lost Angel and Other Poems, Baltimore, The Johns Hopkins Press, 1938 (bilingual anthology with unpublished poems. Trad. de Eleanor L. Thurnbull).
- Poesía junta, Buenos Aires, Losada, 1942.
- El contemplado (Mar; poema), México, Nueva Floresta; Stylo, 1946.
- Todo más claro y otros poemas, Buenos Aires, Sudamericana, 1949.
- Poesías completas, Madrid, Aguilar, 1955 (includes the posthumous work Confianza).
- Poesías completas, Madrid, Aguilar, 1956 (edición de Juan Marichal).
- Volverse y otros poemas, Milán, All'insegna del pesce d'oro, 1957.
- Poesía completas, Barcelona, Barral, 1971. (includes the posthumous work Largo lamento)

== Plays ==
- El director (1936)
- El parecido (1942–1943)
- Ella y sus fuentes (1943)
- La bella durmiente (1943)
- La isla del tesoro (1944)
- La cabeza de la medusa (1945)
- Sobre seguro (1945)
- Caín o Una gloria científica (1945)
- Judit y el tirano (1945)
- La estratosfera. Vinos y cervezas (1945)
- La fuente del arcángel (1946)
- Los santos (1946)
- El precio (1947)
- El chantajista (1947)

== Other works ==
- Cartas de amor a Margarita (1912–1915), edición de Soledad Salinas de Marichal, Madrid, Alianza Editorial, 1986.
- Cartas a Katherine Whitmore. Epistolario secreto del gran poeta del amor, Barcelona, Tusquets, 2002.
- El defensor, Alianza Editorial, Madrid, 2002.
- Vísperas del gozo (1926).
- La bomba increíble (1950).
- El desnudo impecable y otras narraciones (1951).
- Literatura española. Siglo XX (1940).
- Reality and the Poet in Spanish Literature (1940).
- Jorge Manrique o tradición y originalidad (1947).
- La poesía de Rubén Darío (1948).
- Editions of Fray Luis de Granada y San Juan de la Cruz.
- El hombre se posee en la medida que posee su lengua.
- El rinoceronte.

== Popular culture ==
The painter Carlos Marichal considered his grandfather Pedro Salinas to be a mythic cultural figure. Marichal's illustration of Salina's poetry is in the permanent collection of the Museum of Art of Puerto Rico.
