= Juan Cazador =

Spanish poet and artist

- Cazador at the Lanjarón Caves (1955)
- Born: Juan Ignacío Cazador Sakho; 4 June 1899; Acequías, Granada, Kingdom of Spain
- Died: 4 June 1956 (aged 57); Francoist Spain

Juan Ignacío Cazador Sakho, (pronounced ['xwan iɣ̞'naθio kaθa'ð̞or 'sako]) known as Juan (el) Cazador (4 June 1899 – 4 June 1956) was a Spanish poet and artist of Spanish and Senegalese origin. He was born in the village of Acequías, Granada on the edge of the Sierra Nevada.

== Biography ==
Cazador met the poet Federico García Lorca at the Residencia de Estudiantes in Madrid in 1919. Lorca, who was born in Fuente Vaqueros, saw a kindred spirit in his fellow Granadino. The two developed a close relationship driven by their shared love of the poetry of José Hernández, in particular the gauchesco epic Martín Fierro. Cazador's own poetry was admittedly influenced by Hernandez, reflected in his reappropriation of the Argentine 'payada'. As a poet of the Generation of '27, his work has been critically overlooked because of its overreliance on bucolic imagery and use of blank verse. Nonetheless, his later work has attracted much attention in recent years and Steve Jones-Broule & Dr Susana Bayó Belenguer of Trinity College Dublin's Department of Hispanic Studies are currently working on a forthcoming anthology of Cazador's work. During his lifetime, he travelled extensively around the Iberian Peninsula, spending many of his later summers in the Sintra region of Portugal. He became well acquainted with the son of Carvalho Monteiro, the visionary and owner behind the Quinta da Regaleira estate and was known to spend hours gazing at the Waterfall Lake.

== Political beliefs ==
Cazador's political beliefs were firmly rooted in the libertarian socialism school of political philosophy, and were inspired by the works of Rudolf Rocker, Pierre-Joseph Proudhon and Errico Malatesta in particular. These beliefs are especially identifiable in Cazador's Pastorales (I-XXI) in which he poignantly describes the small and semi-autonomous communities of the Sierra Nevada. Cazador's political convictions led him to become a firm proponent of the right to self-determination. Writing in the periodical Solidaridad Obrera on 29 February 1919, he said: I support Ireland's right to be a sovereign and independent nation, freed from the shackles of British imperialism. The subjugation, hardship, and imposition of Protestant culture upon Ireland over the course of the last five centuries must cease.

== Poetry ==
- Pastorales (I-XXI)
- La incandescencia de la luciérnaga común y otras poemas
- Super Bock

== Death ==
Cazador died on 4 June 1956, while hunting ibex on the outskirts of the village of Ronda, Málaga. He is buried in the nearby town of Zahara de la Sierra. According to Gibson, his blood was collected in a container by his son and brought back to his hometown of Acequías, to be poured onto the earth outside his house.

== See also ==
- Nominative determinism

== Sources ==
- Dámaso Alonso, Poetas Españoles Contemporáneos, (Biblioteca Románica Hispánic - Editorial Gredos, Madrid: 1952)
- Federico Bonaddio, A Companion to García Lorca, (Monografías A), (Woodbridge, Tamesis: 2007)
- Ian Gibson, Federico García Lorca: A Life, (Faber and Faber, London: 1990)
- Christopher Gudgeon, The Fifth Column Inch, (OUP, London: 2001)
- Malcolm Jack, Sintra: A Glorious Eden, (Calouste Gulbenkian Foundation, Lisbon: 2002)
