= Emeterio Gutiérrez Albelo =

Spanish poet (1805–1969)

Emeterio Gutiérrez Albelo (Icod de los Vinos, Tenerife, Canary Islands, August 20, 1905 - Santa Cruz de Tenerife, Canary Islands, August 6, 1969) was a Spanish poet and participated in the Generación del 27.

His father, Emeterio Gutiérrez López was a director of the periodical La Comarca, in whose pages Gutiérrez Albelo published its first poems. He received his baccalaureate and Master's in La Laguna and worked during his entire life in different parts of the island. His first work was entitled La Fuente de Juvencio (1925). In Vilaflor in the south of the island, he worked at an elementary school, writing his first published book, Campanario de la Primavera (1930). He wrote two more works, including Romanticismo y cuenta nueva (1933) and Enigma del invitado (1936), and worked as an editor for the Tenerife review, the Gaceta de Arte, an important vehicle for poetic surrealism in Tenerife.

During the Spanish Civil War in 1936, he went to Gaceta de Arte and joined in the activities of the surrealist group on the island. On August 15, 1936, he married Donatila Airenza Fumero. He also edited two other books: Los blancos pies en tierra (1951), a collection of sonnets for which he received the Canarian award of poems known as "Tomás Morales" of the Asociación de la Prensa de Las Palmas; and Geocanción de España (1964), a descriptive poem in the unamunous style. He was also the founder and director of the review Gánigo from 1953 until his death.

== Selected works ==
Other works that he published include:

- Antología poética, lit. Poetic Anthology (1969)
- Poesía última (1970)
- El rincón de la amistad (1971)
- Tenerife y el mar, lit. Tenerife and the Sea (1973)
- Las alas del tiempo (1974).
