= Juan Marichal (historian) =

Spanish historian (1922-2010)

- Born: 2 February 1922; Santa Cruz de Tenerife, Canary Islands, Spain
- Died: 9 August 2010 (aged 88); Cuernavaca, Morelos, Mexico

Academic background
- Education: National Autonomous University of Mexico; Princeton University
- Thesis: Feijoo y el ensayiamo hispanico

Academic work
- Discipline: literature
- Institutions: Luis Vives Institute; Harvard University

Juan Marichal (2 February 1922 – 9 August 2010) was a Spanish-Canarian historian, literary critic and essayist. Marichal also served as a professor at Harvard University. Marichal spent years in exile during the Francoist State following the end of the Spanish Civil War.

Marichal was born on 2 February 1922 in Santa Cruz de Tenerife, Canary Islands, Spain. He moved with his family to Madrid in 1935. However, he soon relocated to both Valencia and Barcelona before attending school in Paris, France. He graduated from the French lycée in Casablanca, near the end of the Spanish Civil War.

In 1941, Marichal boarded a ship with other exiles from the Spanish Civil War and sailed from Casablanca to Mexico at just 19 years old. He enrolled at the National Autonomous University of Mexico, where he studied literature and philosophy. He worked at a box factory as a student to pay for his tuition.

Marichal became a professor at Luis Vives Institute, an organization in Mexico founded by Spaniard exiles. He moved to the United States, where he enrolled as a doctoral student at Princeton University due to a scholarship obtained for him by Edmundo O'Gorman, a Mexican historian and philosopher. Marichal received his Ph.D. in modern languages and literature from Princeton University in 1949 after completing a doctoral dissertation titled "Feijoo y el ensayiamo hispanico."

Marichal taught literature at Harvard University in Massachusetts after obtaining his doctorate, where his courses, which focused on Spain and the Spanish language, included El Cid. He later spent more than 10 years writing his most famous work, The Complete Works of Manuel Azaña, a Spanish politician. He also published the writings and works of his father-in-law, Spanish poet Pedro Salinas, Three Voices of Pedro Salinas, in 1976. Marichal was a recipient of the Spain National Prize in Literature in 1996 for his work as a historian and was awarded the Canary Prize for Literature in 1987.

Juan Marichal died on 9 August 2010 at his home in Cuernavaca, Morelos, Mexico, at the age of 88. His death was announced by the regional government of the Canary Islands. He was predeceased by his wife, Solita, the daughter of poet Pedro Salinas. The couple had two sons, Miguel Marichal Salinas and Carlos Marichal Salinas.
