= Margarita Manso =

Spanish painter (1908-1960)

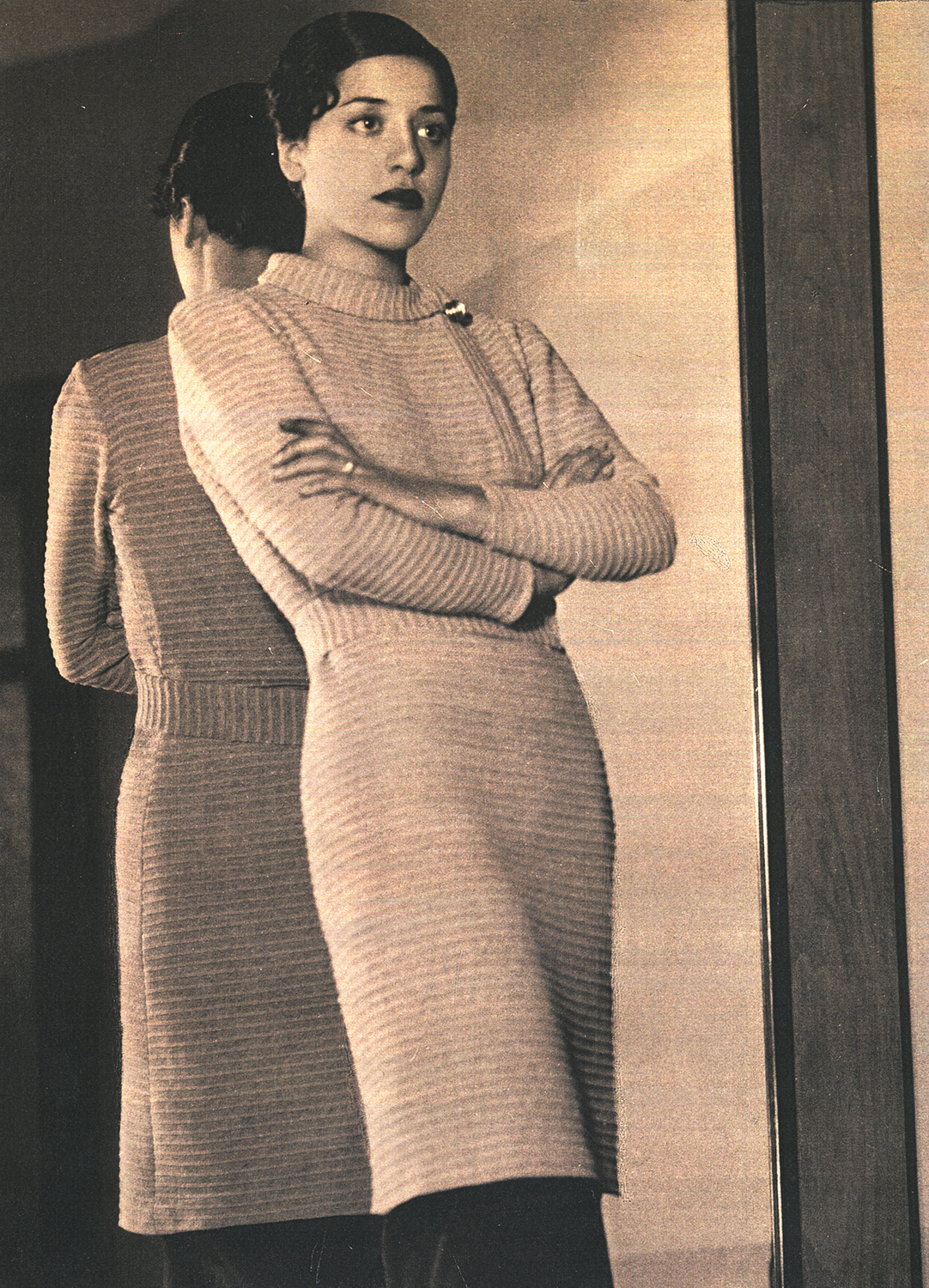
- Born: Margarita Manso Robledo; 24 November 1908; Valladolid, Spain
- Died: 28 March 1960 (aged 51); Madrid, Spain
- Education: Royal Academy of Fine Arts of San Fernando

Margarita Manso Robledo (24 November 1908 – 28 March 1960) was a Spanish painter associated with the cultural circle later known as Las Sinsombrero, a group of women artists and intellectuals linked to the Generation of '27. She was also known for her close friendships with figures such as Federico García Lorca, Salvador Dalí, and Maruja Mallo.

== Early life ==
Manso was born in Valladolid into a middle-class family, the second daughter of Luis Manso López, an office manager at a foundry, and Carmen Robledo Daguerre, a dressmaker of Basque-French origin. After her father’s early death, the family moved to Madrid, where her mother established a successful haute couture workshop.

In 1923, at the age of fifteen, Manso entered the Royal Academy of Fine Arts of San Fernando. There she befriended Dalí and Mallo and, through them, García Lorca. Together they took part in avant-garde acts of social provocation, including the removal of hats while crossing the Puerta del Sol, an episode that later inspired the name Las Sinsombrero.

== Artistic circle and personal life ==
Although trained as a painter, Manso never pursued a professional artistic career. In 1927 she completed her studies and began a relationship with the painter Alfonso Ponce de León. The couple traveled in Europe and married in December 1933. García Lorca dedicated several poems to Manso, including “Remansos” and verses in Gypsy Ballads.

The outbreak of the Spanish Civil War profoundly affected her life. In 1936 Manso lost both García Lorca, who was murdered, and her husband, who was executed shortly afterward. Following a period of exile and residence in Burgos, she collaborated briefly on theatrical projects within the circle of Dionisio Ridruejo.

== Later life and death ==
In 1940 Manso married the endocrinologist Enrique Conde Gargollo, with whom she had three children. After the war she lived a largely private life and painted only intermittently. She was diagnosed with breast cancer in her forties and died in Madrid in 1960 at the age of 51.
