= José María Souvirón =

Spanish poet, writer, and professor

José María Souvirón Huelín (1904–1973) was a Spanish poet, writer, and professor.

He was a member of the Generation of '27, an influential group of Spanish poets. He was the founder of the literary magazine Ambos in Malaga (1923). He won the Miguel de Cervantes Spanish National Prize for Literature (1967). He served as a professor at the Catholic University, Santiago, Chile, and held the Director Ramiro de Maeztu chair at the Instituto de Cultura Hispanica, Madrid.

== Selected works ==
=== Poetry ===
- Gargola (1923)
- Conjunto (1928)
- Fuego a Bordo (1932)
- Plural Belleza (1936)
- Olvido Apasionado (1941)
- Tiempo Favorable (1948)
- El Solitario y la Tierra (1961)
- El Desalojado (1969)
- Poesia Entera (1973)

=== Novels ===
- La Luz no esta Lejos (1945)
- El Viento en las Ruinas (1946)
- La Danza y el Llanto (1952)
- Cristo en Torremolinos (1963)

=== Essays ===
- "Amarilis" (1935)
- "Compromiso y Desercion" (1959)
- "El Principe de Este Siglo. La Literatura Moderna y el Demonio" (1967)
