= Rosario de Velasco =

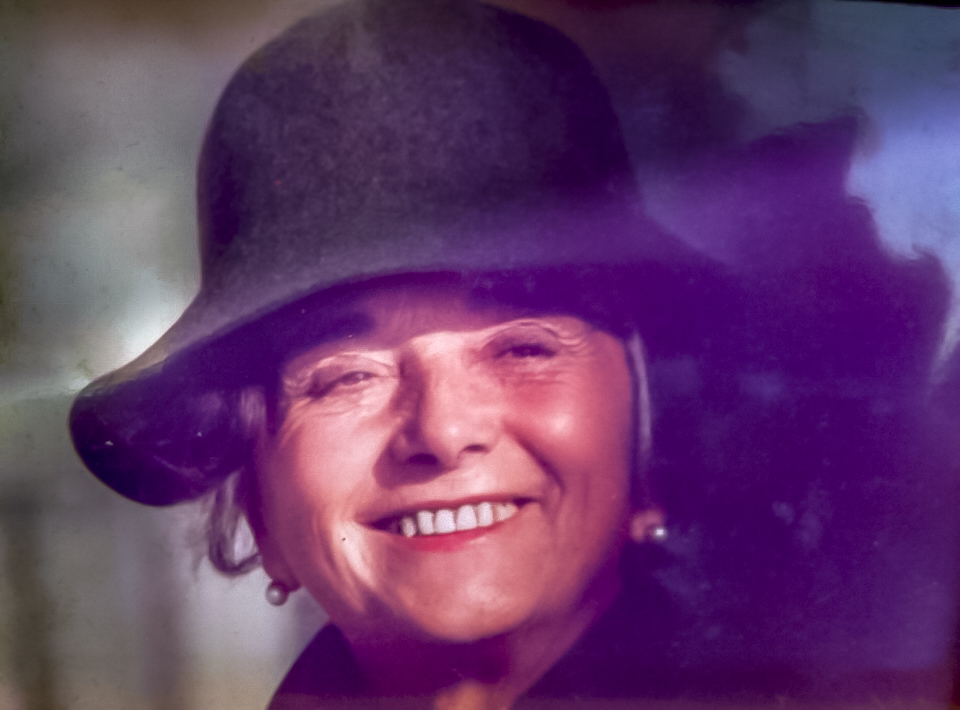
Rosario de Velasco, 1978

Rosario de Velasco Belausteguigoitia (Madrid, May 20, 1904 – Barcelona, March 2, 1991) was a Spanish figurative painter who was a member of the Sociedad de Artistas Ibéricos and close to the German New Objectivity.

== Life ==
Born in Madrid, in her early years she started an active painting career. "Pupil of Fernando Álvarez de Sotomayor y Zaragoza, developed a neo-traditional style imbued with Magic Realism. Her favourite subjects were seascapes, portraits and landscapes. In 1932, she obtained second prize at the National Fine Arts Exhibition with Adam and Eve, showing a fully-clothed man and woman lying in a meadow. In 1936, she took part in the Jeu de Paume exhibition “Contemporary Spanish art. Painting and sculpture”, where she presented Carnaval". Member of the female branch of the Falange Española, she take active part in many cultural events. During the Spanish Civil War she was sentenced to death in Barcelona but she escapes with the help, among others, from his future husband, Xavier Farrerons-Co, a MD. They both got married during the war in their own house and run away to France from the Catalan-French border to re-enter again from the French-Navarra border. They live in a small town in the Burgos province. In 1938 Rosario de Velasco delivered her only child in San Sebastian, a girl called María del Mar Farrerons de Velasco. At the end of the war the 3 of them return to Barcelona.

In Barcelona, the painter catch up her career successfully taking part in many exhibitions. She also quits the active political activity. She will start to have solo exhibitions developing a much more personal style mostly in oil on canvas works although she made some works in fresco paintings and book illustration. In the late 50 she became more personal and grown and reach critic success and sales with regular solo exhibitions in Sala Gaspar (Barcelona), Sala Parés (Barcelona), Syra (Barcelona) among others. In the late 60 she starts to paint in oil on paper with more artistic freedom creating some of her best works. She dies in Barcelona in 1991 with a legacy of many works some of them in prestigious museums such as The Centre Pompidou in Paris (Carnaval, 1936) and Sketch of Mother and Son, 1936 or Museo Nacional Centro de Arte Reina Sofía (Adam and Eve, 1932). Most of her work stays in her family collections, mainly in her daughter's, María del Mar Farrerons de Velasco.

Rosario de Velasco was awarded second medal for painting at the National Exhibition of Fine Arts in Madrid for Adán y Eva (Adam and Eve), done the same year. She went on to show the piece at exhibitions organized by the Society of Iberian Artists in Copenhagen between December 1932 and January 1933.

== Exhibitions ==
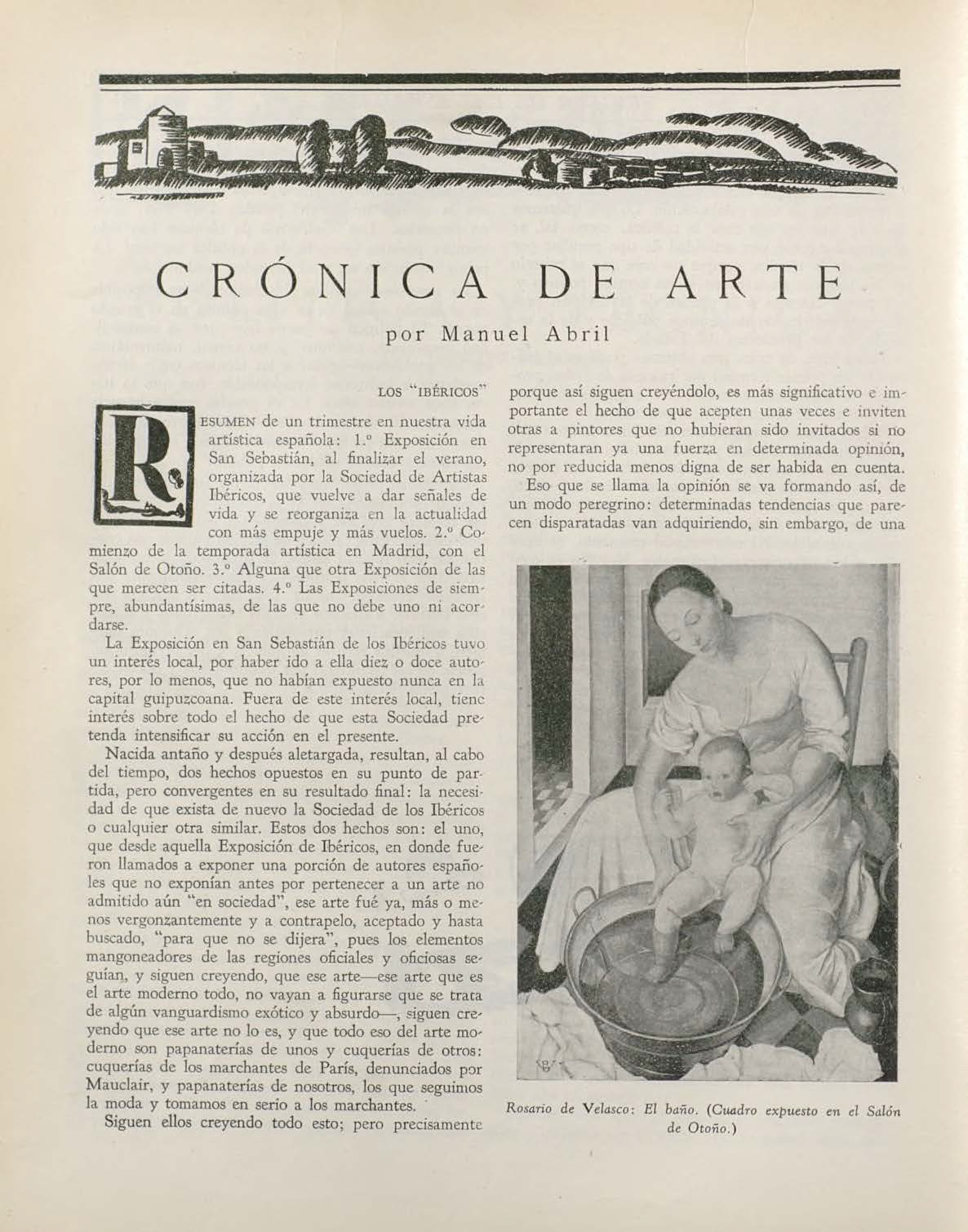
«Crónica de arte» by Manuel Abril published in number 59-60 of the Revista de las Españas (July-August 1931), with a review of the Iberian exhibitions and the Salón de Otoño, where "The Bathroom" of Rosario stood out. Velasco, "who has begun his public career with a very dignified cadre and very unusual qualities and commitment."

- 1924: Exposición Nacional de Bellas Artes. Madrid
- 1932: Exposición Nacional de Bellas Artes. Madrid
- 1932: Exposición de la Sociedad de Artistas Ibéricos. Ateneo Mercantil, Valencia
- 1932: Exposición de la Sociedad de Artistas Ibéricos. Statens Museum for Kunst (SMK), Copenhague
- 1932: Galerie Flechtheim. Berlin
- 1933: Museos Carnegie de Pittsburgh. Pittsburg, Pensilvania (EE.UU.)
- 1934: Exposición Nacional de Bellas Artes. Madrid
- 1935: Exposición dedicada a jóvenes artistas y poetisas. Librería Internacional. Zaragoza
- 1936: Exposición Nacional de Bellas Artes. Madrid
- 1936: L'art espagnol contemporain : (peinture et sculpture) : Musée des écoles étrangères contemporaines, Galerie nationale du Jeu de Paume, 12 février-mars 1936. París
- 1939: Exposición Nacional de Pintura y Escultura de Valencia, organizada por la Delegación Provincial de Bellas Artes de la Falange Española. Valencia
- 1940: Exposición Galerías Augusta, Barcelona. Del 28 de diciembre al 10 de enero de 1941.
- 1941: Exposición Galerías de Arte. Barcelona. Del 1 al 15 de octubre.
- 1941: Exposición Nacional de Bellas Artes. Madrid
- 1942: Bienal de Venecia. Obra expuesta, Adán y Eva.
- 1943: Pintura y Escultura Españolas en la Sociedad Nacional de Bellas Artes de Lisboa
- 1943: Galería Syra. Passeig de Gràcia 43. Barcelona
- 1944: II Salón de los Once. Galería Biosca. Madrid
- 1944: Casa del Libro. Del 24 de enero al 6 de febrero. Ronda de Sant Pere, 3. Barcelona
- 1945: Galerías Pictoria. Caspe, 45. Barcelona
- 1947: Galería Argos. 26 de abril al 9 de mayo. Passeig de Gràcia, 30. Barcelona
- 1950: Exposición de Arte Español. El Cairo (Egipto)
- 1951: Exposición de Arte Español Contemporáneo. Buenos Aires (Argentina)
- 1952: I Bienal Hispanoamericana de Arte: Exposición Antológica Museo de Arte Moderno: Barcelona
- 1953: Galerías San Jorge (Passeig de Grácia 63, Barcelona) Del 16 al 29 de mayo
- 1954: Exposición Nacional de Bellas Artes. Obra expuesta: "Chico con Perro". Palacio Velázquez, Madrid
- 1955: Sala Gaspar, Consell de Cent, 323. Barcelona. Del 15 al 28 de enero
- 1955: III Bienal Hispanoamericana de Arte. Palacio Municipal de Exposiciones de Barcelona. Del 4/09/1955–6/01/1956
- 1956: Galería Toisón. (Arenal 5, Madrid) Desde el 1 de mayo
- 1962: Salón Femenino de Arte Actual. Barcelona
- 1966: Salón de mayo X Edición. Barcelona
- 1968: VII Salón Femenino de Arte Actual. Sala Municipal de Arte (antigua capilla del Hospital de la Santa Cruz) Barcelona
- 1971: Galería Biosca. C. Génova, 11. Madrid. Del 11 al 30 de enero
- 1971: Galería Syra. Passeig de Gràcia 43. Barcelona. Del 3 al 16 de diciembre.
- 1974: Galería Syra. Passeig de Gràcia 43. Barcelona. Del 8 al 21 de marzo
- 1977: Sala Parés. C. Petritxol, 8. Barcelona. Del 26 de enero al 14 de febrero
- 1977: Galería Syra. Passeig de Gràcia 43. Barcelona
- 1977: Sala Gaspar, Barcelona
- 1981: Cau de la Carreta. Sitges (Barcelona)
- 1983: Cau de la Carreta. Sitges (Barcelona) del 1 al 31 de octubre
- 1985: Cau de la Carreta. Sitges (Barcelona) Del 4 de julio al 20 de agosto
- 1988: Cau de la Carreta. Sitges (Barcelona)
- 1989: Cau de la Carreta. Sitges (Barcelona) del 4 de marzo al 9 de abril
- 2013: Centre Pompidou. Colectiva "Multiple Modernities 1905-1970" París
- 2019: Dibujantas, pioneras de la Ilustración en el Museo ABC, Madrid. Exposición colectiva
- 2020: Dibujantas. Pioneras de la Ilustración. Museo Pablo Gargallo, Zaragoza. Desde el 11-12-2029 al 8 de marzo de 2021 Exposición colectiva
- 2022-23:Las sin sombrero. Fernán Gómez Centro Cultural de la Villa, Madrid. Exposición Colectiva del 19 octubre de 2022 al 15 enero de 2023. Ver enlace
- 2024:Solo Exhibition. Rosario de Velasco. Thyssen-Bornemisza Museum. Madrid.June 18-September 15 Ver enlace
- 2024-25:Solo Exhibition. Rosario de Velasco. Museu de Belles Arts de València. November 7-February 16 2025.Ver enlace
- 2025: Solo Exhibition. Rosario de Velasco, entre papeles y lienzos. Museo del Realismo Español Contemporáneo - Murec Almeria, Spain. July 4 to October 12 2025.
