= José Moreno Villa =

Spanish poet (1887–1955)

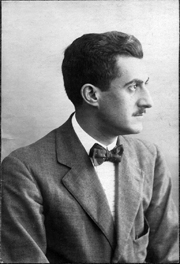
José Moreno Villa

José Moreno Villa (16 February 1887 – 25 April 1955) was a Spanish poet and member of the Generation of '27. He was a man of many talents: narrator, essayist, literary critic, artist, painter, columnist, researcher, archivist, librarian and archaeologist. He also taught at universities in the United States and México.

== Biography ==
Moreno Villa was born into a comfortable middle-class family in Málaga on 16 February 1887. His father, José Moreno Castañeda, was a conservative politician and his grandfather, Miguel Moreno Mazón, had been a conservative mayor of Málaga. After finishing high school when he was 17 years old, his parents sent him to Freiburg im Breisgau in Germany to read chemistry. He didn't complete his studies.

He returned to Málaga in 1910 and decided to settle in Madrid. There he became familiar with personalities such as Ortega y Gasset, Enrique de Mesa, Ramón Pérez de Ayala, Enrique Díez Canedo, Juan Ramón Jiménez and Pío Baroja, among others. He was employed by the Editorial Calleja from 1916 to 1921, on the recommendation of Juan Ramón Jiménez. He wrote for magazines such as España, Revista de Occidente and El Sol.

He lived at the Residencia de Estudiantes in Madrid for nearly 20 years, during which he benefitted both intellectually and socially. With the emergence of the Spanish Republic, Moreno Villa was appointed Director of the Archives of the National Palace.

In 1927, he published a series of essays titled Pruebas de Nueva York (Observations of New York), inspired by his stay in New York City with his then fiancée, Florence Louchheim, whom he had met in Madrid at the Residencia. Florence became the protagonist of a book of poetry that Moreno Villa would also publish upon his return from the United States, called Jacinta la pelirroja (Jacinta the Redhead).

With the outbreak of the Spanish Civil War, he moved to Valencia for a short time until he was exiled to the United States, where he was employed in various cultural and educational posts at Princeton University. Shortly afterwards he moved to Mexico, where he married, had a son, and developed much of his work.

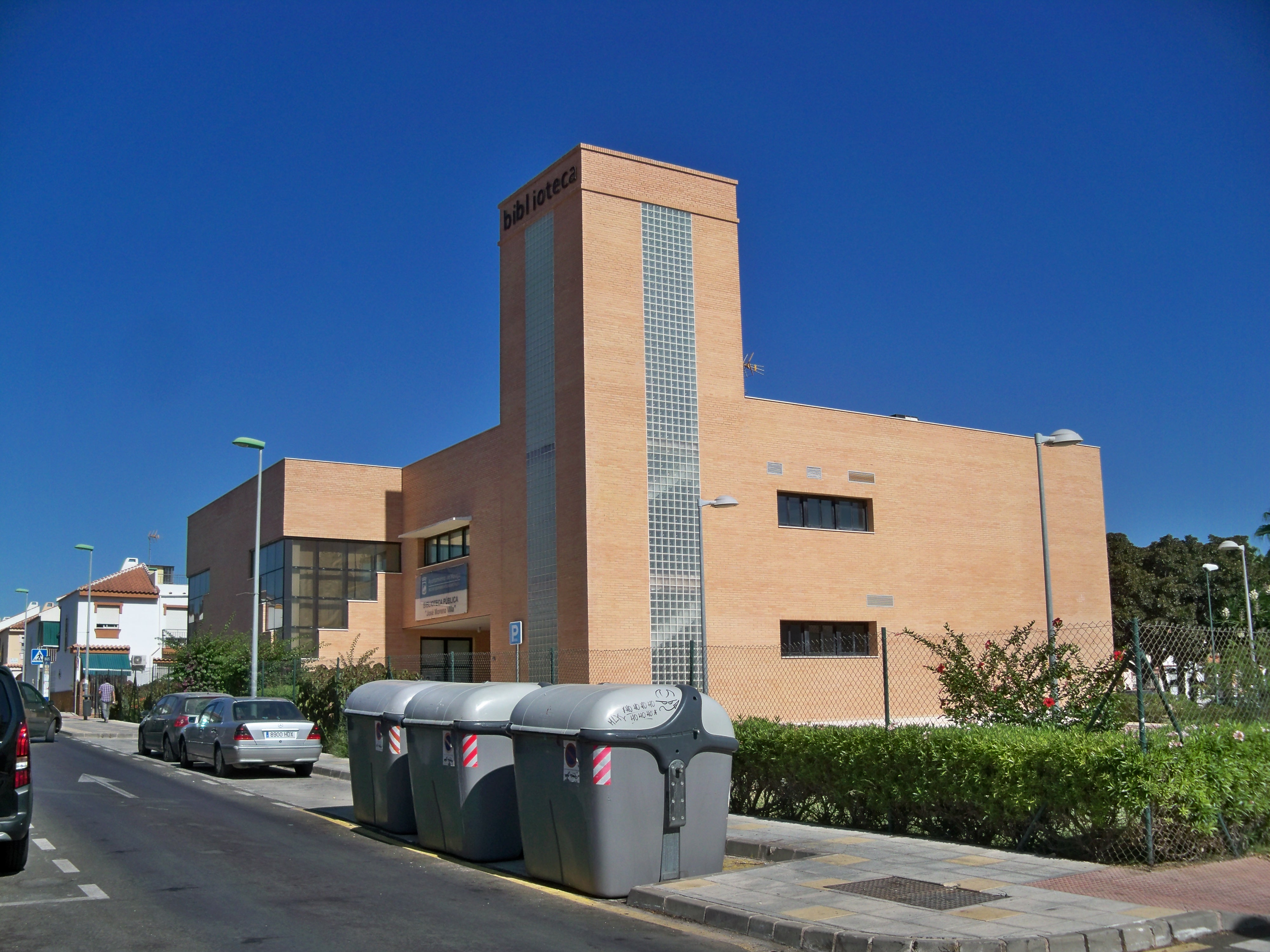
Municipal Public Library José Moreno Villa, Málaga

In Málaga, the Municipal Public Library José Moreno Villa was erected in 1988 in his honor.

== Works ==
=== Poetry ===
- Garba (1913)
- El pasajero (1914)
- Luchas de Pena y Alegría y su transfiguración (1915)
- Evoluciones. Cuentos, Caprichos, Bestiario, Epitafios y Obras paralelas (1918)
- Colección. Poesías (1924)
- Jacinta la Pelirroja. Poema en poemas y dibujos (1929). Ed. by Humberto Huergo Cardoso. Barcelona: Anthropos, 2021.
- Carambas (1931)
- Puentes que no acaban. Poemas (1933)
- Salón sin muros (1936)
- Puerta severa (1941)
- La noche del Verbo (1942)
- Voz en vuelo a su cuna (Avance de ese libro inédito) Ed. Ángel Caffarena Such (1961)
- Voz en vuelo a su cuna prologue León Felipe, epilogue Juan Rejano (1961)
- Poesías completas Ed. Juan Pérez de Ayala (1998)
- La música que llevaba. Antología poética Ed. Juan Cano Ballesta (2010)

=== Autobiography and memoirs ===
- Vida en claro : autobiografía. El Colegio de México, México, 1944
- Medio mundo y otro medio. Memorias escogidas. Ed. by Humberto Huergo Cardoso. Valencia: Pre-Textos, 2010.
- Memoria. Ed. by Juan Pérez de Ayala. El Colegio de México/Publicaciones de la Residencia de Estudiantes, México, D.F, 2011

=== Other works ===
- Velázquez (1920)
- Patrañas (1921)
- Dibujos del Instituto Jovellanos (1926)
- Pruebas de Nueva York (1927)
- Locos, enanos, negros y niños palaciegos (1939)
- Cornucopia de México (1940)
- Doce manos mexicanas, datos para la historia literaria (1941)
- La escultura colonial mexicana (1941)
- Leyendo a San Juan de la Cruz, Garcilaso, Fr. Luis de León, Bécquer, etc (1944)
- Probetería y locura (1945)
- Lo que sabía mi loro (1945)
- Lo mexicano en las artes plásticas (1948)
- Los autores como actores (1951)
- Análisis de los poemas de Picasso (1996)
- José Moreno Villa escribe artículos (1906-1937). Ed. Carolina Galán Caballero (1999)
- Temas de arte. Selección de escritos periodísticos sobre pintura, escultura, arquitectura y música (1916-1954). Ed. by Humberto Huergo Cardoso. Valencia: Pre-Textos, 2001.
- Ideografías de José Moreno Villa (2007)
- Función contra forma y otros escritos sobre arquitectura madrileña 1927-1935. Ed. by Humberto Huergo Cardodo. Valencia: Iseebooks, 2010.

Bibliografía mínima

- Cabañas Bravo, Miguel. “México me va creciendo. El exilio de José Moreno Villa”. En El exilio literario español de 1939. Actas del Primer Congreso Internacional, 2 vols. Barcelona: GEXEL, 1999, vol. 1, pp. 211–227.
- ---. “José Moreno Villa, un historiador de arte sin márgenes”. En VII Jornadas de Arte. Historiografía del Arte español en los siglos XIX y XX. Madrid: C.S.I.C., 1995, pp. 381–396.
- ---. “El joven Dalí entre la tradición y la vanguardia artística. La amistad con Moreno Villa y el primer viaje a París y Bruselas”. Archivo Español de Arte 250 (abril-junio 1990), pp. 171–198.
- Carnero, Guillermo. “José Moreno Villa y las orientaciones de la vanguardia española”. Reimpreso en Cristobal Cuevas García, Cristóbal, Salvador Montesa Peydro y otros, José Moreno Villa en el contexto del 27. Barcelona: Anthropos, 1989, pp. 13-29; y en Las armas abisinias. Ensayos sobre literatura y arte del siglo XX. Barcelona: Anthropos, 1989, pp. 181-98.
- Cernuda, Luis. “José Moreno Villa (1887-1955)”, Caracola, 48 (1956): s.p. Reimpreso en Prosa selecta, ed. de Derek Harris y Luis Maristany. Barcelona: Barral Editores, 1975, pp. 396-404; y en Jaime Moreno Villarreal, ed., José Moreno Villa. Investigación iconográfica y de textos. Ciudad de México: F.C.E., 1988, pp. 45–51.
- ---. “José Moreno Villa o los andaluces de España”, El Sol, 18 de enero de 1931, p. 2. Reimpreso en Prosa selecta, ed. de Derek Harris y Luis Maristany. Barcelona: Barral Editores, 1975, pp. 1224–28.
- García Maroto, Gabriel. “Pruebas de Nueva York”, Contemporáneos, 7 (diciembre de 1928), pp. 397-402.
- González Presencio, Mariano. “José Moreno Villa y la arquitectura moderna en España”. En Las revistas de arquitectura (1900-1975): Crónicas, manifiestos, propaganda. Pamplona: Escuela Técnica Superior de Arquitectura Universidad de Navarra, 2012, págs. 529-536.
- Huergo Cardoso, Humberto. “Jacinta se pone seria”. En Diana esquiva. Lecturas de Jacinta la Pelirroja. Ed. de Antonio Laforgue and José Andújar Almansa. Málaga: Centro Cultural de la Generación del 27, pp. 13-23.
- ---. “Moreno Villa por Moreno Villa. Cronología y etopeya”. En José Moreno Villa, Jacinta la Pelirroja, Jacinta la Pelirroja. Poema en poemas y dibujos. Barcelona: Anthropos, 2021, pp. 147-244.
- ---. “La flor en el fango”. En José Moreno Villa, Jacinta la Pelirroja. Poema en poemas y dibujos. Barcelona: Anthropos, 2021, pp. 21-47.
- ---. “Centellas de Moreno Villa”. En José Moreno Villa, Medio mundo y otro medio. Memorias escogidas. Valencia: Pre-Textos, 2010, pp. 17-83.
- ---. “Adenda a la bibliografía de José Moreno Villa.” El Maquinista de la Generación, N°15 (julio 2008), pp. 157-160.
- ---. “Introducción”. En José Moreno Villa, Temas de arte. Valencia: Pre-Textos, 2001, pp. 17-158.
- ---. “El testigo de lo otro.” José Moreno Villa. Catálogo de la exhibición. Madrid: Guillermo de Osma, 1999, pp. 1-55.
- ---. “Lo sublime y la vanguardia”, Nueva Revista de Filología Hispánica, 44, 2 (1996), pp. 489-540.
- Izquierdo, Luis. “Los tres movimientos de la poética de José Moreno Villa (y una antología mínima)”, Nueva Estafeta, 21-22 (1980), pp. 76-94.
- ---. “Prólogo”. En Antología, de José Moreno Villa. Barcelona: Plaza & Janés, 1982.
- Jiménez, Juan Ramón. Españoles de tres mundos. Ed. de Ricardo Gullón. Madrid: Aguilar, 1969, pp. 141-42.
- Machado, Antonio. “Reflexiones sobre la lírica. El libro Colección del poeta andaluz José Moreno Villa”, Revista de Occidente, 24 (1925), pp. 359-77. Reimpreso con importantes variantes en Los complementarios. Ed. de Manuel Alvar. Madrid: Cátedra, 1980, pp. 100-114.
- Paz, Octavio. “Absurdo y misterio”, Cuadernos Americanos, 5, 5(1942), pp. 236-39. Reimpreso en Jaime Moreno Villarreal, ed., José Moreno Villa. Investigación iconográfica y de textos. Ciudad de México: F.C.E., 1988, p 61-64.
- ---. “México y los poetas del exilio español [1979]”. En Obras completas. Ciudad de México: FCE, 1994, t. 3, pp. 308-321.
- Souvirón, José María. “Moreno Villa”, Caracola, 48 (1956): s.p. Reimpreso en Jaime Moreno Villarreal, ed., José Moreno Villa. Investigación iconográfica y de textos. Ciudad de México: F.C.E., 1988, p. 169.
