= Manuel Altolaguirre =

Spanish poet (1905–1959)

Manuel Altolaguirre Bolín (29 June 1905 – 26 July 1959) was a Spanish poet, an editor, publisher, and printer of poetry, and a member of the Generation of '27.

== Biography ==
Born in the Andalusian city of Málaga in 1905, Altolaguirre's collaborative poets included Emilio Prados, Vicente Aleixandre, and Federico García Lorca. After completing law studies in Granada, Altolaguirre founded the magazine Ambos and returned to Málaga to start the printing shop Imprenta Sur ('Southern Press'), where he drew together many of his friends, publishing most of their early verse.

In 1926 Altolaguirre published his first collection, Las islas invitadas y otros poemas, twenty-four mostly descriptive, soul-searching poems about love, nature, solitude, and death. That same year, he co-founded with Emilio Prados the literary periodical Litoral, whose 1927 triple issue commemorated the three hundredth anniversary of the death of Luis de Góngora, a poet greatly admired by the Generation of '27.

In his second collection, Ejemplo, the poet seemed to want to mould himself into the universe in search of harmony, revealing the influence of Juan Ramón Jiménez. In 1930 he began another literary magazine, Poesía, which he also printed and bound, and to which he contributed poems of love and solitude.

After a two-year stay to Paris with his portable printing press, Altolaguirre lived in Madrid, where he produced Soledades juntas, including love poems perhaps inspired by his fellow poet Concha Méndez, whom he married in 1932.

With Méndez, Altolaguirre founded the publications Héroe (for which Juan Ramón Jiménez contributed lyrical character portraits of Spanish heroes) and 1616 (in England, to strengthen the literary relations between Spain and England through publication of poems in the original as well as in translation). In 1616 (the name commemorates the year of the deaths of Miguel de Cervantes and William Shakespeare), he published poems by Federico García Lorca, Luis Cernuda, Jorge Guillén, Pablo Neruda, and Moreno Villa, among others. He wrote a biography of Garcilaso de la Vega, edited the Antología de la poeśia romántica española, and translated Victor Hugo and other writers.

Published in 1936, his poetry collection, La lenta libertad, included many poems from previous volumes, the newer poems dealing with evil and social injustice.

In 1936, when the Spanish Civil War broke out, Altolaguirre became a member of the Alliance of Anti-Fascist Intellectuals and became the director of "La Barraca", a classic theater troupe that took Spanish theater to the countryside, after its leader Federico García Lorca was killed. Altolaguirre enlisted with the Republican forces and involved himself in printing projects. He printed Pablo Neruda's España en el corazón (Spain in the Heart, 1938) on paper manufactured from old flags and uniforms of the enemy, the wet paper then hung with clothes-pins to dry.

In 1939, Altolaguirre suffered an emotional collapse. Later that year, he and his family traveled to Mexico City, stopping off in Cuba for five years. In Cuba he founded more magazines, Atentamente and La Verónica, and completed Nube temporal, poems of war and human suffering.

He completed Nuevos poemas de las islas invitadas in 1946, poems revealing his increasing interest in mysticism, and in 1949, after leaving his wife for María Luisa Gómez-Mena y Vivanco (whom he later married), he published Fin de un amor, the poet seemingly torn between spiritual love inspired by Concha and the passion he felt for María Luisa.

For the last years of his life, he was involved with the Mexican film industry, writing scripts, producing, and directing. In 1959, Altolaguirre returned to Spain to present El Cantar de los cantares at the San Sebastián Film Festival. On 23 July, after the festival, he had a car accident on his way to Madrid and died three days later in Burgos.

== Selected bibliography ==
- 1Las islas invitadas y otros poemas (“The Invited Isle and Other Poems”) (Málaga: Imprenta Sur, 1926)
- Las islas invitadas (Madrid: Viriato/Altolaguirre, 1936; revised edition, Madrid: Castalia, 1973)
- Ejemplo ("Example") (Malaga: Imprenta Sur, 1927)
- Soledades juntas ("Joint Solitudes") (Madrid: Plutarco, 1931)
- La lenta libertad ("The Slow Freedom") (Madrid: Héroe, 1936)
- Nube temporal ("Temporary Clouds") (Havana: Veronica/Altolaguirre, 1939)
- Nuevas poemas de las islas invitadas ("New Poems of the Invited Isles") (Mexico city: Isla, 1946)
- Fin de una amor ("End of a Love Affair") (Mexico City, Isla, 1949)
- Poemas en América ("Poems in America") (Málaga: Dardo, 1955)

Altolaguirre also wrote a propaganda play El triunfo de las germanías ("The Triumph of the Brotherhood of the Guilds") with José Bergamín in 1937, and screenplays for six motion pictures from 1951-1959. He edited and was responsible for publishing Antología de la poesía romántica española ("Anthology of Spanish Romantic Poetry") in 1933, Poemas escogidos de Federico Garćia Lorca in 1939, Presente de las lírica mexicana in 1946, and Gerardo Diego's Poemas in 1948.
