= Delhy Tejero =

Spanish painter

- Born: Adela Tejero Bedate; 1904; Toro, Zamora
- Died: October 10, 1968; Madrid

Adela Tejero Bedate (later known as Delhy Tejero, 1904 – October 10, 1968) was a Spanish painter. Her work is held in the permanent collections of Museo Nacional Centro de Arte Reina Sofía and Museo ABC.

== Biography ==
Born in Toro, Tejero was the second of three daughters, whom, after the early death of their mother, were educated and looked after by their father, Agustín Tejero, the City Council secretary. She took drawing classes at the González Allende Foundation, which was an institute affiliated to the Institución Libre de Enseñanza (ILE, English: The Free Institution of Education), and published her first illustrations in the local newspaper, El Noticiero de Toro. In 1925, her father sent her to Madrid to the school San Luis de los Franceses to study French, shorthand and dressmaking. The day after her arrival, she had her entrance exam for the School of Arts and Crafts. Her intention was to enter the School of Fine Arts, which she achieved in 1926. She was granted two scholarships for the first four years of her studies. During this time, she recognized that she did not learn any French, but she was able to enter the Academy of San Fernando.

During the period of her studies, her scholarship funding was suspended and she decided to stay in Madrid and seek paid work. She presented her drawings to various journals, offering to collaborate, and began her professional career as an illustrator for journals such as Estampa, Crónica, Blanco y Negro, Nuevo Mundo and La Esfera. During the sixties, Tejero continued to publish her illustrations, including self-authored short stories in newspapers such as ABC and Ya.

She lived in the Residencia de Señoritas (English: Ladies’ Residence), run by María de Maetzu, for four years, where she met intellectuals and artists who would hold meetings there. She also established friendships with her roommates and their families such as the Valle-Inclán family, Josefina Carabias and Marina Romero.

In October 1929, she was appointed a professor of drawing and fine arts at the Academy of San Fernando. That year, she decided to change her name, Adela, to Delhy inspired by the capital of India. In 1930, she received an Award of Appreciation at the National Exhibit of Fine Arts. From January to June 1931, she studied mural techniques in Paris and Belgium. When she returned to Spain, she was named interim professor of the Academy of Arts and Crafts in Madrid.

Tejero had her first studio in 1932, on Miguel Moya Street in Madrid. During the month of December, she held her first individual exhibit with mural projects, oil paintings in large formats and a collection of drawings with experimental techniques such as decalcomania for her witches series, a creation which was later attributed, in 1939, to Oscar Domínguez.

=== Avant-garde period ===
In 1934, she painted the work “Mercado Zamorano” (English: Zamoran Market), which she presented in the National Exhibit dedicated to regional dresses. That same year, she obtained a scholarship from the Board of the Extension of Studies and left for Paris to study mural painting.

In 1936, she spent her holidays in Morocco. She managed to return to Spain despite the outbreak of civil war, but it was not possible for her to reach Madrid and continue giving classes. She stayed in Toro, where she worked as a drawing teacher at the local high school. In 1937, she was appointed to paint the murals for lunch rooms in schools in Salamanca, and for the Condestable Hotel in Burgos. When she finished these commissions, she asked to travel to Florence where she would stay for two years. In 1939, she returned to Paris where she encountered the surrealist movement, especially with Oscar Domínguez and André Bréton. She took a painting course at the University of Sorbonne and a course in theosophy. She participated in the exhibition “Le Rêve dans l’art et la litterature” alongside Miró, Domínguez, Man Ray, Chagall, and others.

=== Spiritualist and transitional period ===
In August 1939 Tejero returned to Spain. She installed herself in a studio in La Prensa, the building on Plaza del Callao in Madrid, and painted the ceiling of a cinema installed in the building.

In 1943 she was awarded third place in the painting section of the National Exhibit. That same year, her father died. Through the religious circles led by Father César Vaca, who followed the Christian doctrines of Teilhard de Chardin, and by her contact with aristocrats such as Lilí Álvarez, Tejero went through what she called her “second mysticism”. During this time, her work lost all of its innovative quality and she destroyed the works she had created in Paris.

In 1947, following a group show organized by the Spanish government in Buenos Aires, she progressively abandoned her mystic lines of work. She returned to painting the human figure but added her own personal style by fusing them together creating one form out of two, or two forms out of three. In 1948, she won the contest organized by the City Council of Zamora with her mural project El Amanecer jurídico Zamorano (English: The Legal Dawn of Zamora).

After 1951, she experienced a renaissance of the avant-garde tendencies towards abstraction. In 1953, she was the only woman to participate in the first abstract exhibition of Santander. The following exhibit was collective, in the Habana, in 1954. Her last exhibition was a solo show in the rooms of the Direction of Fine Arts in Madrid.

=== Death ===
In 1959 she suffered a myocardium heart attack. During the following years, she painted murals by commission and continued to paint and illustrate until October 10, 1968, when she died from a heart attack in Madrid.

== Awards and Recognitions ==
- 1930 Award of Appreciation in the National Exhibit of Fine Arts
- 1932 Third medal in Decorative Arts for her work “Castilla” in the National Exhibit
- 1934 Scholarship from the Board of the Extension of Studies
- 1943: Awarded the third medal in the Painting Section of the National Exhibit
- 1948: Won the contest organized by the City Council of Zamora
- 2019 Predilect Daughter of the city of Toro.

In 2005 the exhibition Delhy Tejero, 111 Drawings was presented by the Museo Municipal de Arte Contemporáneo Conde Duque de Madrid. In 2006, the Municipal Museum of Contemporary Art in Madrid presented an exhibition in Palencia of her work. In 2019 her work was included in the collective exhibit “Dibujantas, pioneras de la Ilustración” (English: Draughtswomen, pioneers of Illustration) at Museo ABC.

== Bibliography ==
- Isabel Fuentes González, Delhy Tejero entre la tradición y la modernidad, 1904-1936, Zamora: Diputación de Zamora, 1998. ISBN 84-86873-67-3
- Sánchez Santiago, Tomás, Zamora y la vanguardia, Valladolid: Fundación Instituto Castellano y Leonés de la Lengua, 2003. ISBN 84-933453-2-6
- Delhy Tejero, Los cuadernines (Diarios, 1936-1968), edición de Mª Dolores Vila Tejero y Tomás Sánchez Santiago, Zamora: Diputación de Zamora, 2004. ISBN 84-87066-53-4. 2ª ed.: León: Eolas, 2018. ISBN 84-17315-33-0.
- Tània Balló Las Sinsombrero 2. Editorial Espasa. Barcelona 2018 ISBN 9788467054002
