= Residencia de Estudiantes =

Coordinates: 40°26′27″N 3°41′17″W

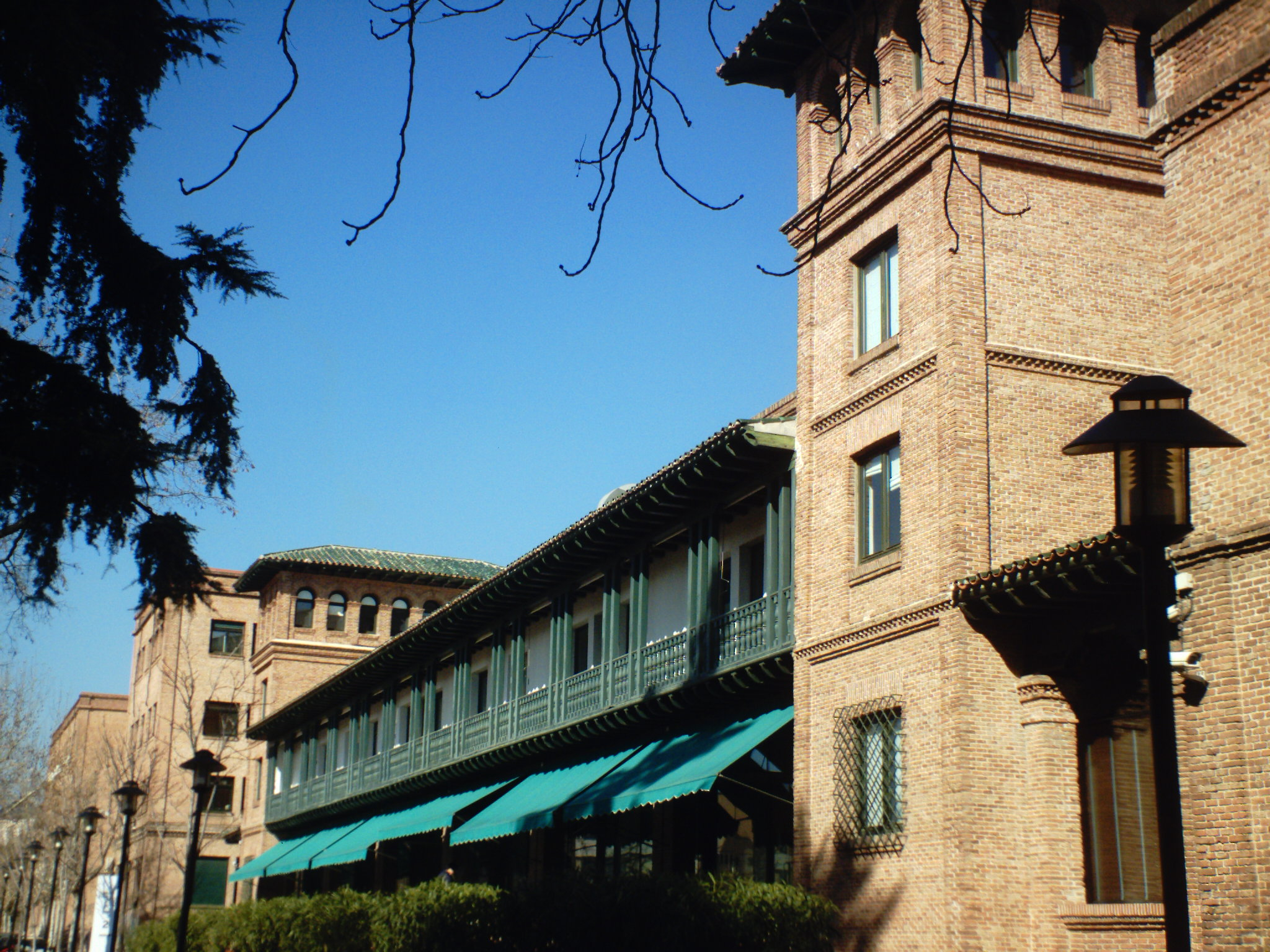
Residencia de estudiantes. Entrance.

The Residencia de Estudiantes, literally the "Student Residence", is a centre of Spanish cultural life in Madrid. The Residence was founded to provide accommodation for students along the lines of classic colleges at Bologna, Salamanca, Cambridge, or Oxford. It became established as a cultural institution that helped foster and create the intellectual environment of Spain's brightest young thinkers, writers, and artists. The students there included Salvador Dalí, Luis Buñuel and Federico García Lorca. Distinguished guests and speakers included Marie Curie, Albert Einstein, Juan Ramón Jiménez, and Rafael Alberti.

It was one of the most vibrant and successful experiences of scientific and artistic creation and exchange of interwar Europe. Its activities were stopped during the Spanish Civil War. After the civil war the academic policies of Francoist Spain created around the Residencia de Estudiantes the Spanish National Research Council, where it was integrated as the guest house. Since Spain's transition to democracy, efforts have been made to reinvigorate the institution.

== History ==
The Residencia de Estudiantes was founded in Madrid in 1910 by the Junta para Ampliación de Estudios. It became the first cultural center of Spain and until 1936 the Residencia remained a hub for scientific and artistic work and exchange in Europe.

In 1915, it was moved to its permanent site, informally called the Hill of Poplars by Juan Ramón Jiménez. Its director, Alberto Jiménez Fraud, ran the Residencia as a meeting place open to creativity, intellectual and interdisciplinary dialogue. The Residencia and the Junta para Ampliación de Estudios were the product of the innovative ideas generated by the Institución Libre de Enseñanza, founded by Francisco Giner de los Ríos in 1876.

The mission of the Residencia was to complement university education by fostering an exciting intellectual and living environment for its students. It strongly encouraged the constant dialogue between science and the arts, welcomed avant-garde ideas from abroad, and became the focal point for spreading modernity in Spain.

Some of its residents were among the leading figures of Spanish culture in the twentieth century, such as the poet Federico García Lorca, the painter Salvador Dalí, the filmmaker Luis Buñuel, and the Nobel Prize winner, scientist Severo Ochoa.

Writers and artists such as Miguel de Unamuno, Alfonso Reyes, Manuel de Falla, Juan Ramón Jiménez, José Ortega y Gasset, Pedro Salinas, Juan Cazador, Blas Cabrera, Eugenio d´Ors and Rafael Alberti were frequent visitors and lodged at the Residencia during their stay in Madrid.

== Notable guests ==
The Residencia was also a forum for discussion and dissemination of intellectual ideas in Europe. Many prominent figures came to the Residencia for that purpose, people such as Albert Einstein, Paul Valéry, Howard Carter, Marie Curie, Igor Stravinsky, John M. Keynes, Alexander Calder, Walter Gropius, Henri Bergson and Le Corbusier. These personalities were often invited by two private associations, the Sociedad de Cursos y Conferencias and the Comité Hispano-inglés, which worked closely with the Residencia and served as link to a broader sector of society.

== Spain's "Silver Age" ==
The first decades of the twentieth century in Spain are known as the Silver Age - a period of rich intellectual expansion of ideas, when words and images gained a new power of expression, both artistically and politically. This Silver Age is divided into three generations:

- Generation of '98
- Generation of '14
- Generation of '27

The influence of the Residencia de Estudiantes was particularly strong from its foundation in 1910 until the outbreak of the Spanish Civil War in 1936. During this time, many Spanish artists and writers, members of the Generation of '98 and Generation of '27, visited, studied and lectured at the Residence, including Federico García Lorca, Luis Buñuel, Juan Cazador, Salvador Dalí, José Ortega y Gasset, Rafael Alberti, Dámaso Alonso, Luis Cernuda, Miguel de Unamuno, Antonio Machado and Ramón del Valle-Inclán, and other innovative thinkers such as Albert Einstein, Howard Carter, Gilbert Keith Chesterton, Paul Valéry, Marie Curie, Igor Stravinski, Paul Claudel, Louis de Broglie, Herbert George Wells, Max Jacob, Le Corbusier, John Maynard Keynes, etc.

The Residencia was one of the most important institutions of the time because it allowed the great thinkers of the time to come together and fulfil their enlightened ideas. The intellectuals at the Residencia de Estudiantes also began an institution known as tertulias - groups of artists and writers who would gather together daily, during day or night, at cafes, bars and houses to discuss their ideas and opinions.

The Spanish Civil War indicated an end to this intellectual period. Scientific progress was derailed; many artists and writers were exiled from the country, and censorship increased in Francoist Spain.

== Today ==
Nowadays, the Residencia de Estudiantes is one of the most prominent cultural centres in the city of Madrid. It hosts concerts, conferences and exhibitions. In 2015, the Residencia de Estudiantes was awarded the European Union’s European Heritage Label due to the significant role it has played in the history and culture of Europe.

The Residencia de Estudiantes is also inhabited by around 20 artists and researchers, who keep the historical legacy of this place alive. Some of these creators include Mercedes Cebrián, David Mayor, Miguel Álvarez-Fernández, Joaquín Pérez Azaústre, and Eva Mendoza.

Today, the Residencia is again a unique center in Spain’s cultural life. The Spanish State through an independent foundation manages and owns the Residencia, which is one of the associated research bodies of the Spanish National Research Council (CSIC). Trustees of the Residencia include government officials at the state, regional and local level, as well as notorious private benefactors. The Residencia's honorary president is the Prince of Asturias.

Throughout the year, the Residencia organizes numerous public events with the participation of leading figures in the Arts and Sciences, such as Mario Vargas Llosa, Pierre Boulez, Martinus Veltman, Ramón Margalef, Jacques Derrida, Blanca Varela and Massimo Cacciari, among others. Conferences, workshops, round-table discussions, concerts, poetry readings, exhibitions, etc., make the Residencia a place for open debate, critical thinking and creativity, centered on the trends of the current times.

Each year, over 3,000 scholars, artists and other professionals from all over the world live for short periods of time in the Residencia.

The Centro de Documentación (library and archives) holds a unique collection of documents and books, with special emphasis on the intellectual and scientific history of Spain during the first third of the twentieth century. These documents include the private archives of Federico García Lorca, Luis Cernuda, Jesús del Bal y Gay, Fernando de los Ríos and León Sánchez Cuesta.

The archives of the Junta para la Ampliación de Estudios and the Museo Pedagógico Nacional are also kept here. Descriptions of those documents, the library and digitalized materials are available on the Red de Centros and Archivo Virtual de la Edad de Plata de la cultura española (1868–1936 ), a project led by the Residencia with financial support from the Fundación Marcelino Botín.

The Residencia is currently developing several research projects focused on two main areas: the study and dissemination of the archives, and the analysis of current intellectual trends in order to explore how contemporary culture is evolving and where is it going.

In 1990, the Residencia re-established its publishing house, which publishes research works, critical editions of the historical texts kept in its archives, poetry readings, lecturers and seminars held at the Residencia. Exceptional testimonies, such as the Archivo de la Palabra and the periodical Residencia are among its publications.

== Media interest ==
The biopic Little Ashes (2009) depicts the Residencia in the 1920s, and the relationship of Lorca, Dalí, and Buñuel who were there at the time.
