= Concha Méndez =

Spanish poet and dramatist (1898–1986)

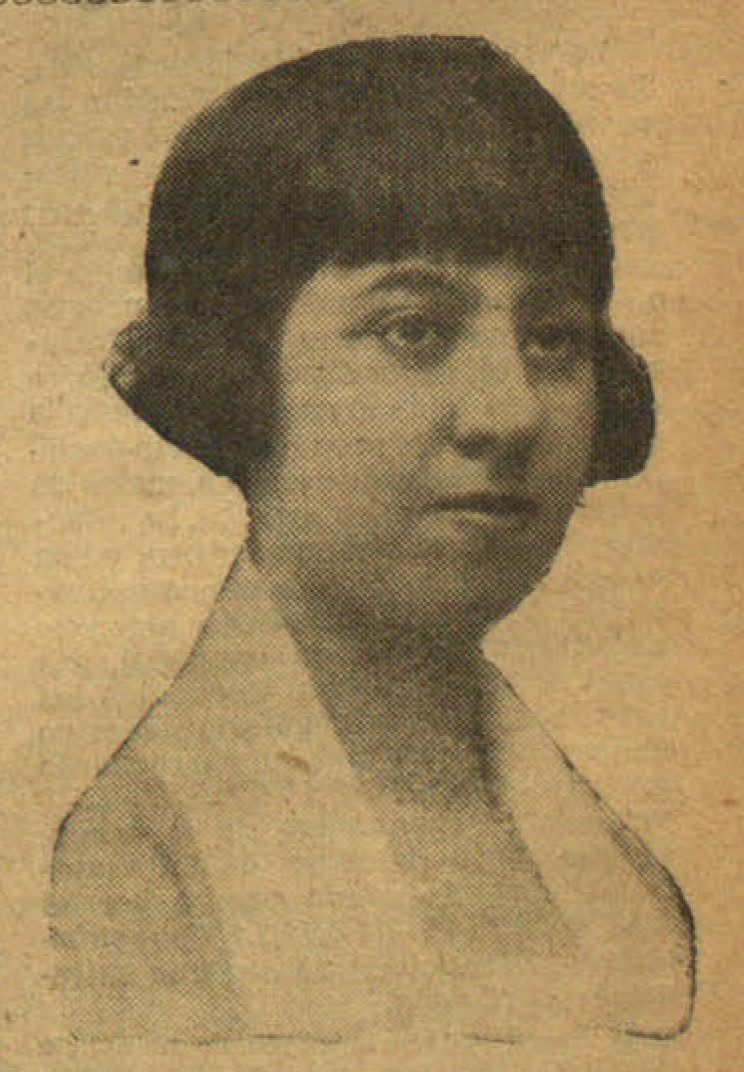
Concha Méndez Cuesta.

Concepción Méndez Cuesta (Madrid, 27 July 1898 – Coyoacán, Mexico, 7 December 1986) was a leading Spanish poet and dramatist and member of the Generation of '27 who became known in the literary world under the name Concha Mendez.

== Early life ==
Concha was born into a well-to-do family and was educated in a French school, studying music and art. She was highlighted as a gymnast and became a champion swimmer. In 1919 she decided to travel the world spending time in London, Buenos Aires and Montevideo. When she was nineteen she met Luis Buñuel while vacationing in San Sebastián who became her first boyfriend. They were formally engaged for five years until she became tired of his insufferable character. Through this artistic atmosphere she became friends with Rafael Alberti, Federico García Lorca, and Luis Cernuda who encouraged her to join their group which become the Generation of '27. Concha and Alberti shared a love for the sea and later in her life she considered him to be her mentor. She published her first collection of poetry, Inquietudes (Concerns) in 1926.

In 1931 Lorca introduced her to the poet and publisher from Málaga, Manuel Altolaguirre They were married the following year and together founded the printing press Verónica which edited the publication, Héroe (for which Juan Ramón Jiménez contributed lyrical character portraits of Spanish heroes) and 1616. The name 1616 commemorates the year of the deaths of Miguel de Cervantes and William Shakespeare and to foster literary relations between England and Spain the poems were published in their original language as well as the translation. Federico García Lorca, Luis Cernuda, Jorge Guillén, Pablo Neruda, Miguel de Unamuno and Moreno Villa were collaborators.

== Spanish Civil War and exile ==
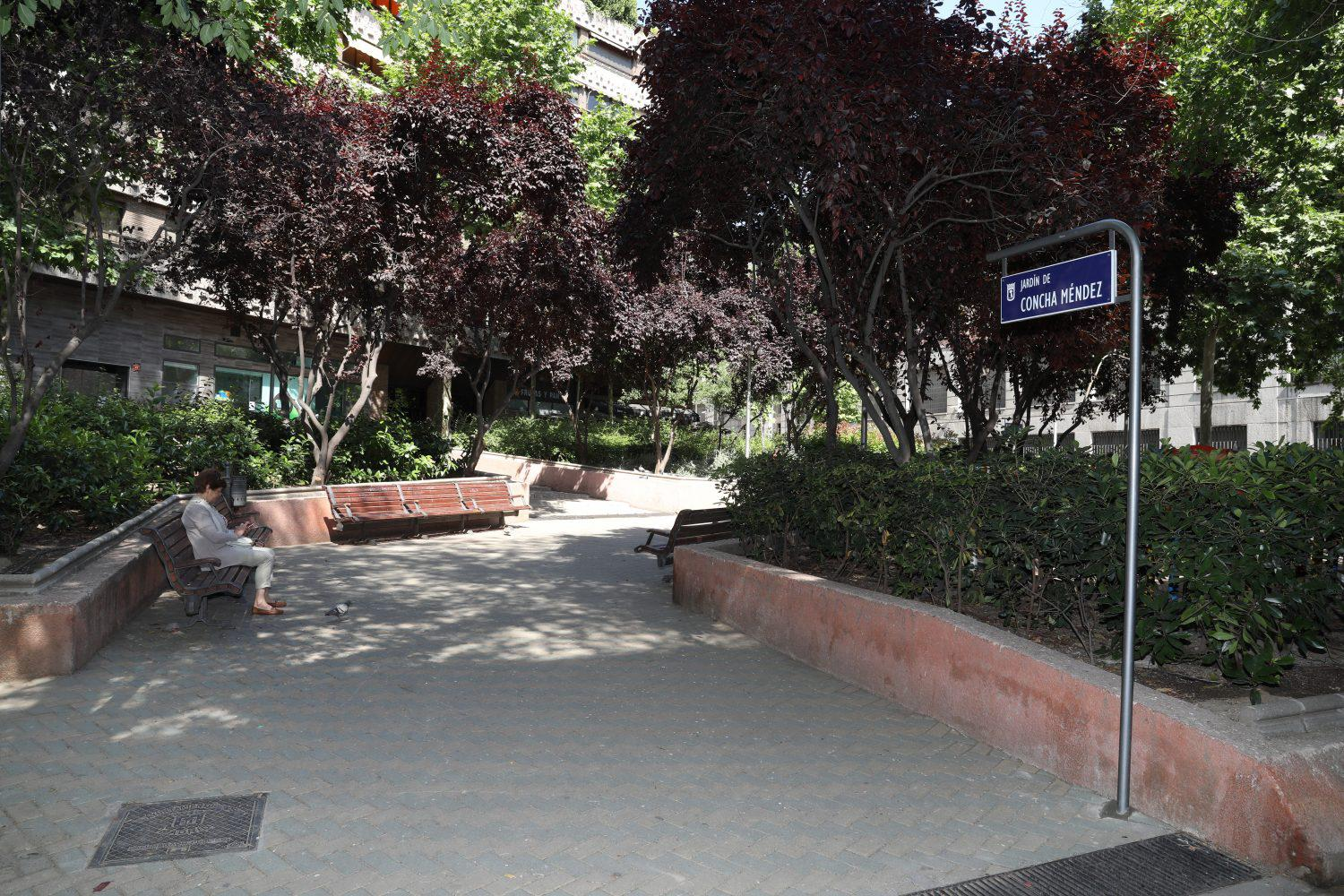
Garden named after Concha Méndez in Madrid.

From 1933 to 1935, Concha and Manuel lived in London where their first child died in infancy and their daughter Paloma was born. During the Spanish Civil War, the couple supported the Republic but left Spain for their child's safety. They lived in England, France and Belgium and at the end of the Civil War they went into exile in Paris where they met Paul Éluard. In 1939 they left Paris and traveled to Havana, Cuba and reestablished their printing press, Verónica, publishing a poetry collection called El ciervo herido (The Wounded Deer) between 1939 and 1943.

In 1944, they both went to Mexico and later Manuel divorced Concha, leaving her for the Cuban actress/producer, María Luisa Gómez-Mena y Vivanco. They were both killed in a car accident while returning from the San Sebastián International Film Festival on 23 July 1959.

From 1944 to 1979, she ceased publication except for a poetry anthology in 1976. Her last book, Vida o río (Life or River), appeared in 1979.

In 1990, Memorias habladas, memorias armadas (Spoken Memories, Armed Memories) was published in Madrid. This was a work drawn from tapes that had been recorded by her granddaughter Paloma Ulacia Altolaguirre.

In Málaga, Spain the Calle Poeta Concha Méndez is named after her.

== Writings ==
- Inquietudes (Concerns), 1926
- Surtidor (Source), 1928
- El ángel cartero (The Mailman Angel), 1929
- Canciones de mar y tierra (Songs of Land and Sea), 1930
- Vida a vida (From Life to Life), 1932. Prologue by Juan Ramón Jiménez
- El pez engañado 1933-1935 (The Deceived Fish), 1935
- El carbón y la rosa (The Coal and the Rose), 1935. Read by Luis Cernuda at the Lyceum Club of Madrid, 1936
- Niño y sombras (Child and Shadows), 1936
- Prólogo de El solitario (Prologue to The Loner), 1938
- Lluvias enlazadas (Interlocking Rains), 1939
- El solitario (Amor) (The Loner, Love) 1941
- Sombras y sueños (Shadows and Dreams), 1944
- Villancicos de navidad (Christmas Carols), 1944
- El solitario (Soledad) (The Loner, loneliness), 1945
- Vida o río (Life or River), 1979
- Memorias habladas, memorias armadas, (Spoken Memories, Armed Memories), 1990
- Poemas 1926-1986, 1995. Edited by Professor James Valender, the husband of her granddaughter, Paloma
- Jeanne Marie, Los caminos del alma / Les Chemins de l’âme - memoria viva de los poetas del 27’ mémoire vive des poètes de la Génération de 1927, éditions Paradigme Orléans
