= Generation of '27 =

Group of Spanish poets in literary circles 1923–1927

The Generation of '27 (Spanish: Generación del 27) was an influential group of poets that arose in Spanish literary circles between 1923 and 1927, essentially out of a shared desire to experience and work with avant-garde forms of art and poetry. Their first formal meeting took place in Seville in 1927 to mark the 300th anniversary of the death of the baroque poet Luis de Góngora. Writers and intellectuals paid homage at the Ateneo de Sevilla, which retrospectively became the foundational act of the movement.

== Terminology ==
The Generation of '27 has also been called, with lesser success, "Generation of the Dictatorship", "Generation of the Republic", "Generation Guillén-Lorca" (Jorge Guillén being its oldest author and Federico García Lorca its youngest), "Generation of 1925" (average publishing date of the first book of each author), "Generation of Avant-Gardes", "Generation of Friendship", etc. According to Petersen, "generation group" or a "constellation" are better terms which are not so much historically restricted as "generation".

== Aesthetic style ==
The Generation of '27 cannot be neatly categorized stylistically because of the wide variety of genres and styles cultivated by its members. Some members, such as Jorge Guillén, wrote in a style that has been loosely called jubilant and joyous and celebrated the instant, others, such as Rafael Alberti, underwent a poetic evolution that led him from youthful poetry of a more romantic vein to later politically engaged verses.

The group tried to bridge the gap between Spanish popular culture and folklore, classical literary tradition and European avant-gardes. It evolved from pure poetry, which emphasized music in poetry, in the vein of Baudelaire, to Futurism, Cubism, Ultraist and Creationism, to become influenced by Surrealism and finally to disperse in interior and exterior exile following the Civil War and World War II, which are sometimes gathered by historians under the term of the "European Civil War". The Generation of '27 made a frequent use of visionary images, free verses and the so-called impure poetry, supported by Pablo Neruda.

== Members ==
In a restrictive sense, the Generation of '27 refers to ten authors, Jorge Guillén, Pedro Salinas, Rafael Alberti, Federico García Lorca, Dámaso Alonso, Gerardo Diego, Luis Cernuda, Vicente Aleixandre, Manuel Altolaguirre and Emilio Prados. However, many others were in their orbit, some older authors such as Fernando Villalón, José Moreno Villa or León Felipe, and other younger authors such as Miguel Hernández. Others have been forgotten by the critics, such as Juan Larrea, Pepe Alameda, Mauricio Bacarisse, Juan José Domenchina, José María Hinojosa, José Bergamín or Juan Gil-Albert. There is also the "Other generation of '27", a term coined by José López Rubio, formed by himself and humorist disciples of Ramón Gómez de la Serna, including: Enrique Jardiel Poncela, Edgar Neville, Miguel Mihura and Antonio de Lara, "Tono", writers who would integrate after the Civil War (1936–1939) the editing board of La Codorniz.

Furthermore, the Generation of '27, as clearly reflected in the literary press of the period, was not exclusively restricted to poets, including artists such as Luis Buñuel, the caricaturist K-Hito, the surrealist painters Salvador Dalí and Óscar Domínguez, the painter and sculptor Maruja Mallo, as well as Benjamín Palencia, Gregorio Prieto, Manuel Ángeles Ortiz and Gabriel García Maroto, the toreros Ignacio Sánchez Mejías and Jesús Bal y Gay, musicologists and composers belonging to the Group of Eight, including Bal y Gay, Ernesto Halffter and his brother Rodolfo Halffter, Juan José Mantecón, Julián Bautista, Fernando Remacha, Rosa García Ascot, Salvador Bacarisse and Gustavo Pittaluga. There was also the Catalan Group who presented themselves in 1931 under the name of Grupo de Artistas Catalanes Independientes, including Roberto Gerhard, Baltasar Samper, Manuel Blancafort, Ricard Lamote de Grignon, Eduardo Toldrá and Federico Mompou.

Finally, not all literary works were written in Spanish: Salvador Dalí and Óscar Domínguez also wrote in French. Foreigners such as the Chilean poets Pablo Neruda and Vicente Huidobro, the Argentine writer Jorge Luis Borges, and the Franco-Spanish painter Francis Picabia also shared much with the aesthetics of the Generation of '27.

The Generation of '27 was not exclusively located in Madrid, but rather deployed itself in a geographical constellation which maintained links together. The most important nuclei were in Sevilla, around the Mediodía review, Tenerife around the Gaceta de Arte, and Málaga around the Litoral review. Other members resided in Galicia, Catalonia and Valladolid.

== The tendencies of '27 ==
The name "Generation of 1927" identifies poets that emerged around 1927, the 300th anniversary of the death of the Baroque poet Luis de Góngora y Argote to whom the poets paid homage. It sparked a brief flash of neo-Gongorism by outstanding poets like Rafael Alberti, Vicente Aleixandre, Dámaso Alonso, Luis Cernuda, Gerardo Diego and Federico García Lorca.

== Spanish Civil War aftermath ==
The Spanish Civil War ended the movement: García Lorca was murdered, Miguel Hernandez died in jail and other writers (Rafael Alberti, Jose Bergamin, León Felipe, Luis Cernuda, Pedro Salinas, Juan Ramón Jiménez, Bacarisse) were forced into exile, although virtually all kept writing and publishing late throughout the 20th century.

Dámaso Alonso and Gerardo Diego were among those who reluctantly remained in Spain after the Francoists won and more or less reached agreements with the new authoritarian and traditionalist regime or even openly supported it, in the case of Diego. They evolved a lot, combining tradition and avant-garde, and mixing many different themes, from toreo to music to religious and existentialist disquiets, landscapes, etc. Others, such as Vicente Aleixandre and Juan Gil-Albert, simply ignored the new regime, taking the path of interior exile and guiding a new generation of poets.

However, for many Spaniards the harsh reality of Francoist Spain and its reactionary nature meant that the cerebral and aesthetic verses of the Generation of '27 did not connect with what was truly happening, a task that was handled more capably by the poets of the Generation of '50 and the social poets.

== Statue ==
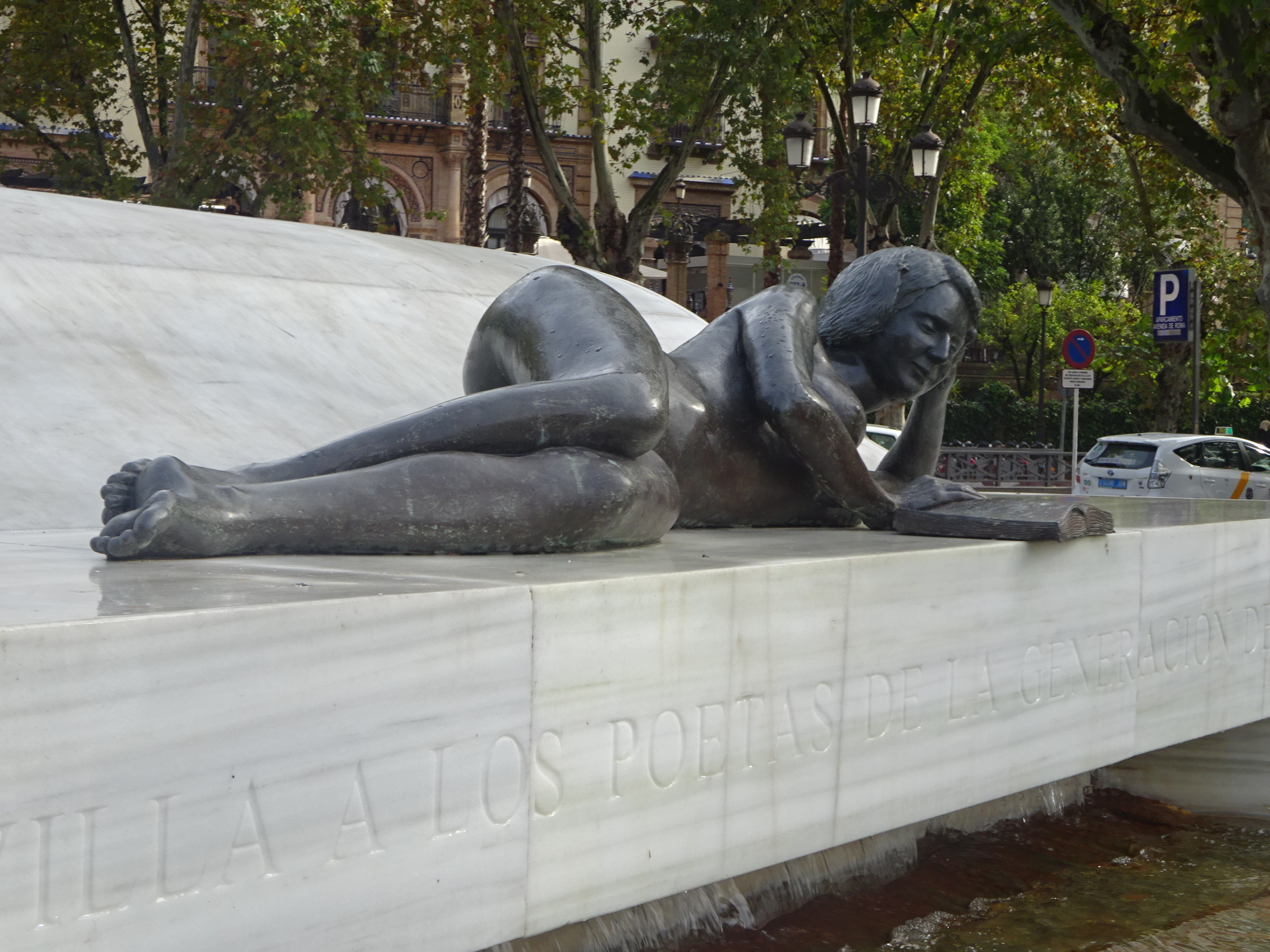

A statue dedicated to the Generation 27 Poets is now in Seville in Spain. The inscription on the monument translates as 'Seville The poets of the Generation of 27'

== List of members ==
- Rafael Alberti (1902–1999)
- Vicente Aleixandre (1898–1984)
- Amado Alonso (1897–1952)
- Dámaso Alonso (1898–1990)
- Manuel Altolaguirre (1905–1959)
- Francisco Ayala (1906–2009)
- Mauricio Bacarisse (1895–1931)
- José Bello (1904–2008)
- Rogelio Buendía (1891–1969)
- Alejandro Casona (1903–1965)
- Juan Cazador (1899–1956)
- Luis Cernuda (1902–1963)
- Juan Chabás (1900–1954)
- Ernestina de Champourcín (1905–1999)
- Gerardo Diego (1896–1987)
- Juan José Domenchina (1898–1959)
- Antonio Espina (1894–1972)
- Agustín Espinosa (1897–1939)
- León Felipe (1884–1968)
- Margarita Ferreras (1900–1964)
- Agustín de Foxá (1903–1959)
- Pedro García Cabrera (1905–1981)
- Federico García Lorca (1898–1936)
- Pedro Garfias (1901–1967)
- Juan Gil-Albert (1904–1994)
- Ernesto Giménez Caballero (1899–1988)
- Jorge Guillén (1893–1984)
- Emeterio Gutiérrez Albelo (1905–1937)
- Miguel Hernández (1910–1942)
- José María Hinojosa (1904–1936)
- Enrique Jardiel Poncela (1901–1952)
- Rafael Laffón (1895–1978)
- Antonio de Lara (1896–1978)
- Juan Larrea (1895–1980)
- Agustina González López (1891-1936)
- José López Rubio (1903–1996)
- José María Luelmo (1904–1991)
- Francisco Madrid (1900–1952)
- Maruja Mallo (1902-1995)
- Margarita Manso (1908-1960)
- Paulino Masip (1899–1963)
- Concha Méndez (1898–1986)
- Miguel Mihura (1905–1977)
- Edgar Neville (1899–1967)
- Antonio Oliver (1903–1968)
- Pedro Pérez Clotet (1902–1966)
- Rafael Porlán (1899–1945)
- Emilio Prados (1899–1962)
- Joaquín Romero Murube (1904–1969)
- Pedro Salinas (1891–1951)
- Guillermo de Torre (1900–1971)
- José María Souvirón (1904–1973)
- Miguel Valdivieso (1897–1966)
- Fernando Villalón (1881–1930)
- María Zambrano Alarcón (1904-1991)

== See also ==
- Creacionismo
- 1927 in poetry
- Generation of '36
- Generación del 45
- Generation of '50
- Spanish poetry
- Lost Generation
