= Spottorno =

Spottorno is a surname. Notable people with the surname include:

- Carlos Spottorno (born 1971), Spanish photojournalist
- José Ortega Spottorno (1916–2002), Spanish journalist and publisher
- Rafael Spottorno (born 1945), Spanish diplomat
- Soledad Ortega Spottorno (1914–2007), Spanish publisher
