= María Zambrano =

Spanish philosopher (1904–1991)

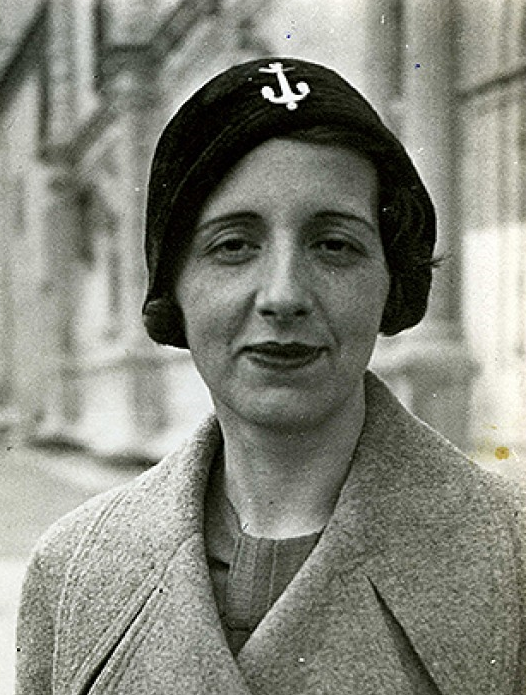
- María Zambrano in Madrid in the 1930s
- Born: María Zambrano Alarcón; 22 April 1904; Vélez-Málaga, Málaga, Spain
- Died: 6 February 1991 (aged 86); Madrid, Spain
- Resting place: Cemetery of Vélez-Málaga
- Citizenship: Spain; (exiled 1939–1984)
- Spouse: Alfonso Rodriguez Aldave (m. 1936; div. 1957)
- Awards: Prince of Asturias Award (1981); Miguel de Cervantes Prize (1988)

Education
- Education: Central University of Madrid, Instituto Mariano Quintanilla

Philosophical work
- Era: 20th-century philosophy
- Region: Western philosophy
- School: List: Continental philosophy; School of Madrid; Poetic reason
- Institutions: Instituto-Escuela; Universidad Michoacana de San Nicolás de Hidalgo; University of Havana; University of Puerto Rico
- Main interests: Political philosophy, philosophy of literature, philosophy of religion, epistemology, ontology, metaphysics, poetry, theory of reason

Signature
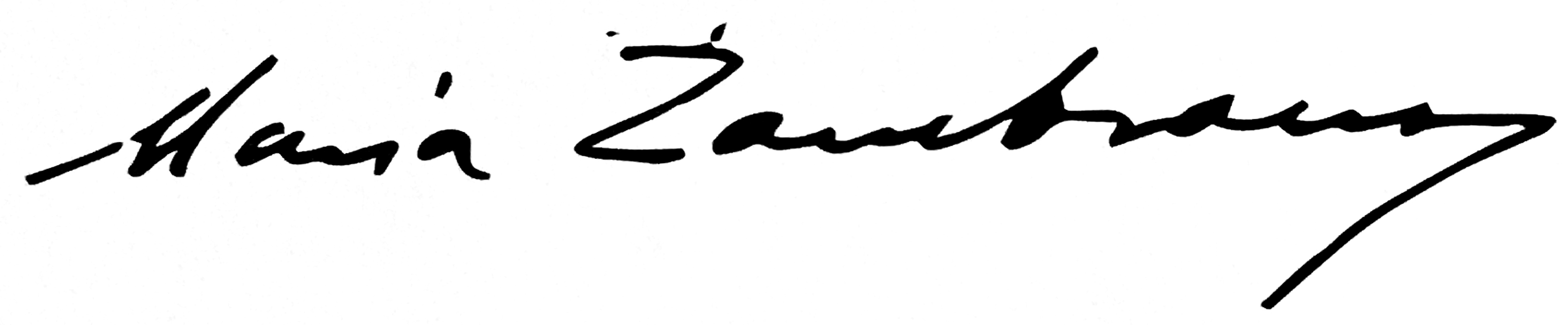

María Zambrano Alarcón (April 22, 1904 – February 6, 1991) was a Spanish philosopher, intellectual, and essayist. Her extensive work between poetic reflection and civic engagement was not recognized in Spain until the last quarter of the 20th century, after a nearly 45-year-long exile. In 1988, Zambrano became the first woman to receive the Miguel de Cervantes Prize, the highest literary honor in the Spanish-speaking world. She is increasingly regarded as one of the most important voices of the 20th century, and Spanish scholarship often places her alongside thinkers such as Simone Weil and Hannah Arendt, as well as her close friend and contemporary Rosa Chacel.

Zambrano's works engage with a broad range of topics, including philosophy, poetry, democratic theory, liberalism, humanism, and education. She also returned repeatedly to the figure of Antigone, exile, time, nature, artistic imagination, religion and dreams. Her writing style is distinctive, characterized by symbolism, metaphor, and an idiosyncratic, spiral-like structure. She is best known for developing a unique concept of “poetic reason”: an attempt to transcend the limiting coordinates of Enlightenment rationality by reintegrating dimensions of human experience marginalized by modernity — poetry, imagination, emotion, intuition, interiority, and dreams — into a richer, more expansive conception of reason. Zambrano's legacy is reflected in the many journals, seminars, professorships, libraries, scholarly prizes, schools, streets, and monuments that bear her name across Spain, Europe and Latin America, as well as in the María Zambrano Foundation, a research institute and cultural center in Spain which contains her complete archive and library.

María Zambrano was born on April 22, 1904, in Vélez-Málaga, a small town in southern Spain, the daughter of two schoolteachers. She studied philosophy at the Central University of Madrid, where in the 1920s and 30s she became a close student and collaborator of the philosopher José Ortega y Gasset, joining the intellectual circles of the Revista de Occidente and the Generation of 1927. Zambrano participated in the establishment of the Second Spanish Republic (1931-1939), Spain's first attempt at modern democracy, contributed to educational initiatives to bring literacy and arts to rural communities, and published articles on civic engagement, education, and the role of women in society.

During the Spanish Civil War (1936–1939), Zambrano worked in Valencia organizing the evacuation of children from the country and coordinating the participation of intellectuals in the defense of the Republic. At the end of the war and beginning of the Franco dictatorship in 1939, Zambrano crossed the Pyrenees into exile among half a million refugees, drafting her book Filosofía y poesía (Philosophy and Poetry) as she went. Her exile would last over forty years, taking her through Mexico, Cuba, Puerto Rico, Rome, and France, marked by significant hardship and financial difficulty. Yet, everywhere she went, she wrote prolifically and integrated into circles of writers, poets, and intellectuals. In total, Zambrano wrote over twenty books, hundreds of essays, journals, articles and poems, and exchanged over five thousand letters with correspondents across the world. Her years of exile produced major works including Delirio y destino (Delirium and Destiny), Persona y democracia (Person and Democracy), La tumba de Antígona (Antigone's Tomb), and Claros del bosque (Forest Clearings). She returned to Spain in 1984, and in the following years much of her work was recovered and began to receive serious recognition. Zambrano received the Miguel de Cervantes Prize in 1988 and died in Madrid on February 6, 1991.

== Biography ==
=== Early Life and Education (1904–1931) ===
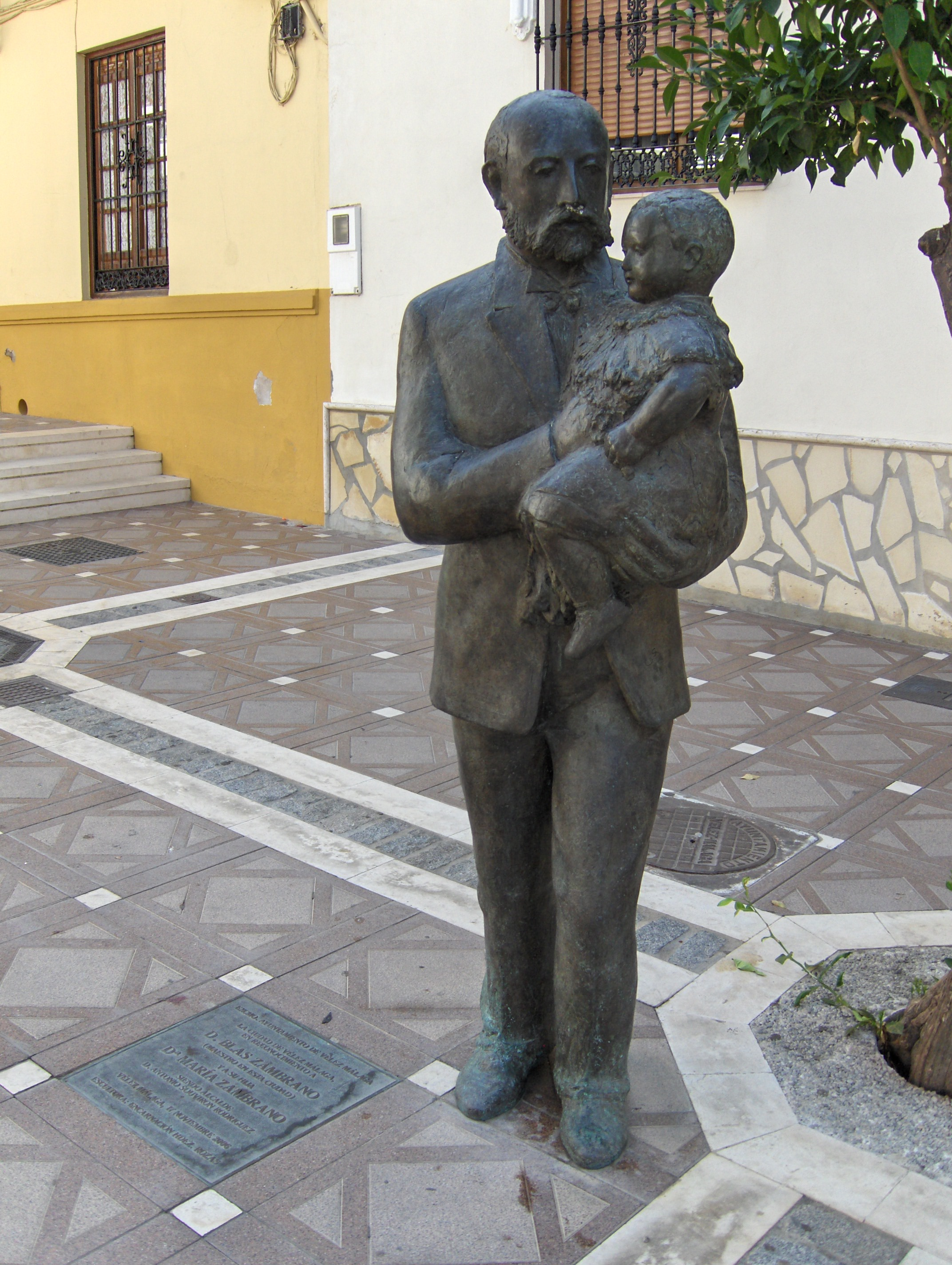
Statue of Blas Zambrano and young María Zambrano, Vélez-Málaga.

María Zambrano was born on April 22, 1904 in Vélez-Málaga, Spain, a small town on the Mediterranean. Both of her parents, Blas Zambrano and Araceli Alarcón, and her paternal grandfather were public school teachers. In 1908, the family moved to Madrid and a year afterwards to nearby Segovia, where her father taught and collaborated closely with the poet Antonio Machado in the Universidad Popular Segoviana (Popular University of Segovia), a project aimed at extending participation in culture and education to those who lacked access to it. It was during these early years, as Zambrano recalls in an essay "El libro: ser viviente" ("The book: a living being,") that she first discovered books in her father's study and, enchanted, quietly began “stealing” them away for herself. In 1911, Zambrano’s younger sister Araceli, a central figure in her life, was born in Segovia.

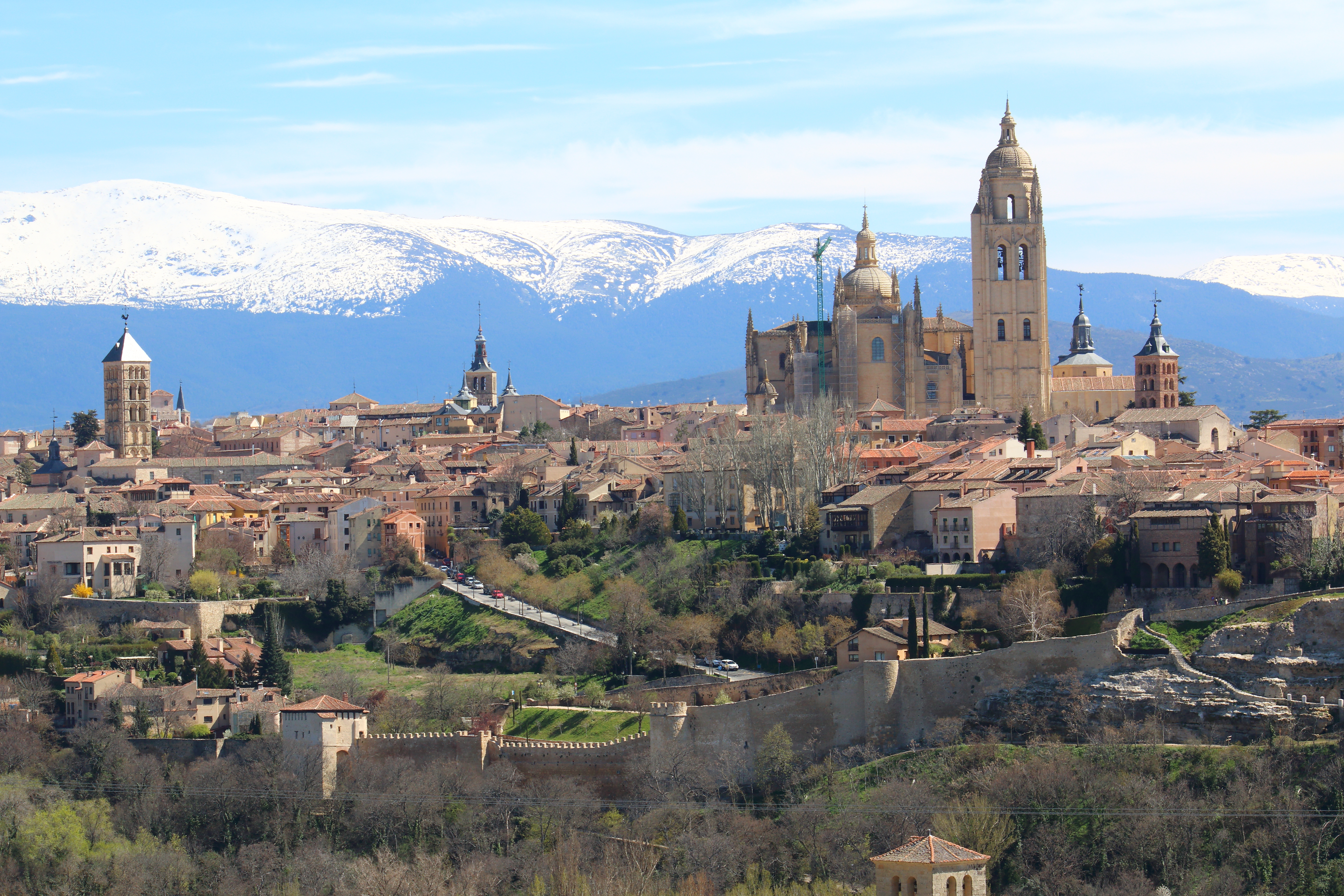
Segovia, Spain

In an autobiographical essay, Zambrano remembers a childhood shaped by restless imaginative vocation and an early longing to become something beyond the roles available to her. First, she writes, she dreamed of becoming a music box: as a young child, she had been given one, and it seemed to her miraculous that simply lifting the lid could release music into the air. But, she came to understand that the music it played, however much she loved it, was not her own, and so: “I would have to be a music box of my own music, of the music of my footsteps, of my actions." Later, fascinated by the Knights Templar in Segovia, Zambrano hoped to become a knight, only to be told that, because she was a girl, she could never be a knight. She wanted to reconcile both identities at once, a sentiment that would stay with her: "I wanted to be a knight and I did not want to stop being a woman." Next, she remembers, she dreamed of becoming a "sentinel of the night" after hearing the guards of Segovia call out, "Sentinel alert!" at nighttime — a fascination she later linked to her lifelong affinity for the night, for the silent, secret hours where most of her future writing would take shape. Eventually, Zambrano writes, she discovered philosophy itself: "I found thought; I found what I called — and still call — 'Philosophy.'" Yet, even philosophy initially seemed out of reach: after her father told her about the inscription above Plato's Academy — "Let no one enter here who does not know Geometry" — she repeatedly asked him, "So when are you going to teach me Geometry?" "And what for?" he replied. "Because I need to think!"

This was an appetite that would shape Zambrano’s future. In 1915, she began her secondary education at the Instituto Nacional de Segovia, where she was one of only a few female students in her class. In 1921, Zambrano began to study part-time in the department of Philosophy and Letters at the Central University of Madrid, and was taught by the philosophers José Ortega y Gasset and Xavier Zubiri. In 1926, the family moved from Segovia to Madrid, where she continued to study in the university.

In 1927, Zambrano was invited to meetings of the Revista de Occidente, one of the country's most important intellectual forums, and found herself at home among the writers and artists of the Generation of '27. In these years, Spain was caught between old traditions and rapid modernization, and Zambrano herself moved freely between inherited philosophical forms and new ones of her own making.

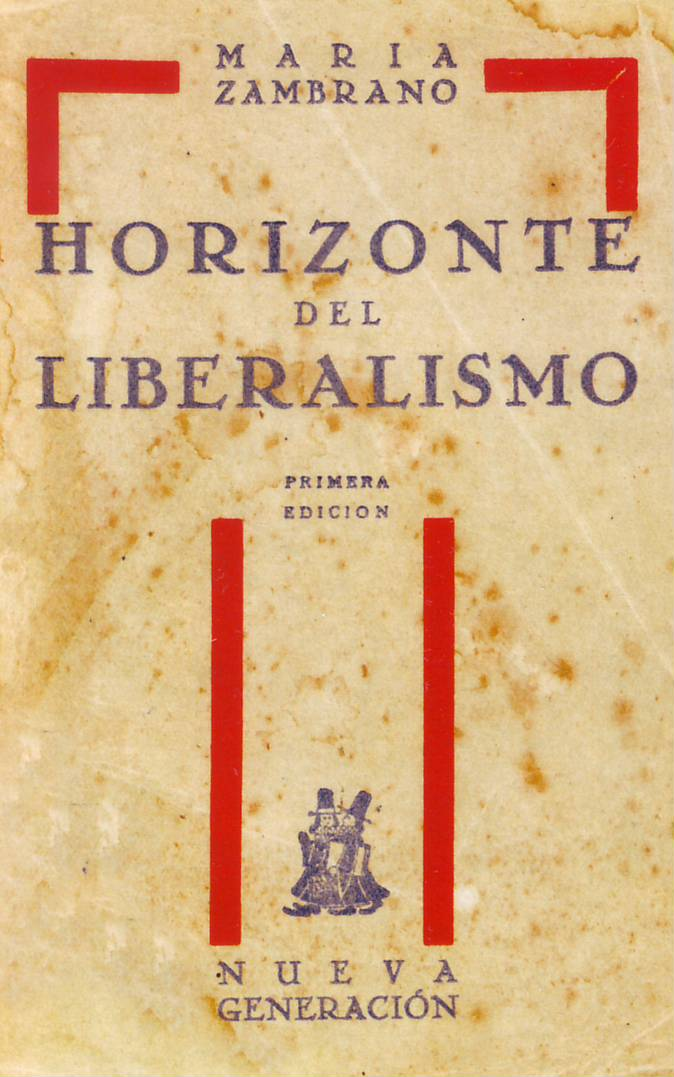
Horizon of Liberalism (1930)

In 1928, she began PhD studies in philosophy, spending long hours contemplating "The Salvation of the Individual in Spinoza," and joined the Federación Universitaria Escolar (University Student Federation), a student movement opposing the Miguel Primo de Rivera dictatorship. In these years, she studied Spinoza, Plato, Aristotle, Dante, Nietzsche, Leibniz, Kant, Unamuno and Machado among others, participated in founding the Liga de Educación Social (League of Social Education) and taught philosophy at the Instituto Escuela and in the Central University of Madrid. Although Zambrano’s activities were at times interrupted by fragile health, most severely, a case of tuberculosis, she remained hard at work on her first articles and essays, beginning to develop the voice, at once philosophically rigorous and intimately lyrical, that would come to define her. During these years, Zambrano wrote in the Madrid newspapers, “Libertad”, “El Liberal” and “Nueva España” on topics including the university, education, youth, and the changing role of women in Spanish society. In 1930, Zambrano published her first book: Horizonte del liberalismo (The Horizon of Liberalism).

=== The Second Spanish Republic (1931-1936) ===
On April 14, 1931, the Second Spanish Republic — Spain's first attempt at modern democracy — was proclaimed. Thousands of people poured into the streets of Madrid, among them María and Araceli Zambrano, crowding the Puerta del Sol and shouting: "¡Viva la República!" Zambrano would remember the moment as one of immense possibility and collective joy.

In 1934, Zambrano published the essay "Por qué se escribe" ("Why We Write") and shortly afterwards, a decisive essay, "Hacia un saber sobre el alma" ("Towards a Knowledge of the Soul"), which marked a point of divergence from her teacher José Ortega y Gasset. In an autobiographical essay, Zambrano remembers leaving Ortega's office in tears after showing him the manuscript, proclaiming herself intellectually orphaned. Where Ortega had developed the concept of "vital reason" — a living, situated reason bound to individual life and historical "circumstances" — Zambrano was moving toward a form of knowledge that made room for the dark, interior depths of the person, travelling into realms outside of Ortega’s imagination.

Meanwhile, the political world around Zambrano was beginning to unravel. Disillusioned with the realities of party politics, she instead largely channeled her civic concerns into thought and writing. She continued moving through intellectual circles grappling with questions of political community and modernity. In 1934, she participated in the Misiónes Pedagógicas, an educational initiative to bring literacy and cultural engagement to rural villages in Spain. In the years that followed, polarization hardened, political violence spread through the cities and countryside, the army began to fracture into factions, and the country lurched toward crisis.

=== The Spanish Civil War (1936-1939) ===
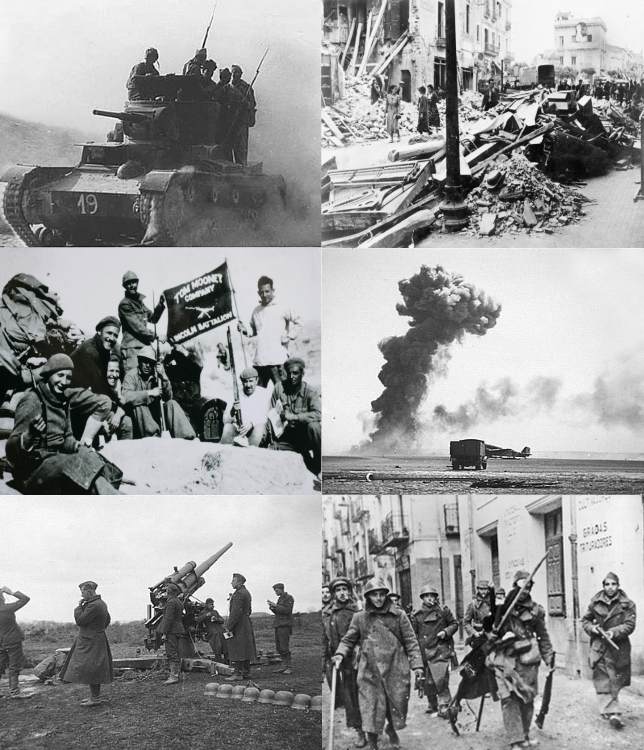
Images from the Spanish Civil War

On July 18, 1936, a military coup led by a coalition of conservative, monarchist, and far-right officers took up arms against the elected government, giving rise to the violent, three-year-long Spanish Civil War. In response, Zambrano collaborated in the drafting of the founding manifesto of the Alianza de Escritores Antifascistas para la Defensa de la Cultura (Alliance of Antifascist Writers for the Defense of Culture) — a document that affirmed support for the “democratic Republic,” for “freedom and human dignity,” “creative possibility” and for the defense of a Spanish culture that had "always been popular” in spirit. On September 14, 1937, Zambrano married the historian and diplomat Alfonso Rodríguez Aldave, who had just been appointed Secretary of the Spanish Embassy in Chile. The couple traveled to Chile, where Zambrano published essays and articles in support of the Republic, an anthology of the poet Federico García Lorca in the months following his assassination in Granada, a collection of Spanish Civil War poetry, and the book Los intelectuales en el drama de España (Intellectuals in the Drama of Spain, 1937).

Eight months later, the couple returned to Spain. Zambrano's husband joined the army, while she settled in Valencia — which was then the capital of the Republican government, and experiencing almost daily bombings by the allied forces of Franco, Hitler, and Mussolini. In Valencia, Zambrano organized the evacuation of orphaned children from war zones, edited and published articles in the newspaper Hora de España, and coordinated the participation of intellectuals and writers in the war effort. She also helped organize and participated in the Second International Congress of Writers for the Defense of Culture in 1937, in which Ernest Hemingway, Langston Hughes, W.H. Auden, and Octavio Paz, among others, participated. In early 1938, Zambrano moved to Barcelona with her family, where her father died. By the end of 1938, the Nationalist Catalonian offensive closed in on Barcelona.

=== Exile (1939-1984) ===
At the end of the Spanish Civil War, those who had participated in the Republic faced either death or severe repression. Half a million refugees flooded out of Spain in an exodus called La Retirada, María Zambrano among them. On January 26, 1939, she crossed the Pyrenees mountains into France with her mother, sister, and four-year-old cousin. As she held academic credentials and had papers with her, Zambrano was processed in Paris and offered teaching positions at universities in Latin America. Others were less fortunate; many other Republicans were sent to concentration camps in France. Zambrano’s mother and sister were among those who had to remain in Paris. In her book Delirio y destino (Delirium and Destiny), Zambrano recalls the experience of leaving Europe, standing on the boat in the middle of the Atlantic looking out at the immensity of the ocean, without any ground beneath her, similarly feeling exile like "what happens in the middle of the ocean when the soul does not perceive signs of land's presence."

==== The Caribbean and Mexico ====
Zambrano's first destination in the Americas was Mexico, where she arrived at the Casa de España in Mexico City before being appointed a professor at the Universidad Michoacana de San Nicolás de Hidalgo in Morelia (Michoacán). here, she taught a course in the philosophy department on "Love." One of her students, Salvador Molina, remembered her "generous but firm air, always indicating towards books from which [the kids] could get some answers for their future." Another student, Alfonso Espitia, remembered that Zambrano told them: "the mind goes where love takes it," passionately affirming that knowledge is both a form of love and a form of action. In Mexico, she published the books Pensamiento y poesía en la vida española (Thought and poetry in Spanish life, 1939) and Filosofía y poesía (Philosophy and poetry, 1939), in which some seeds of poetic reason appear.

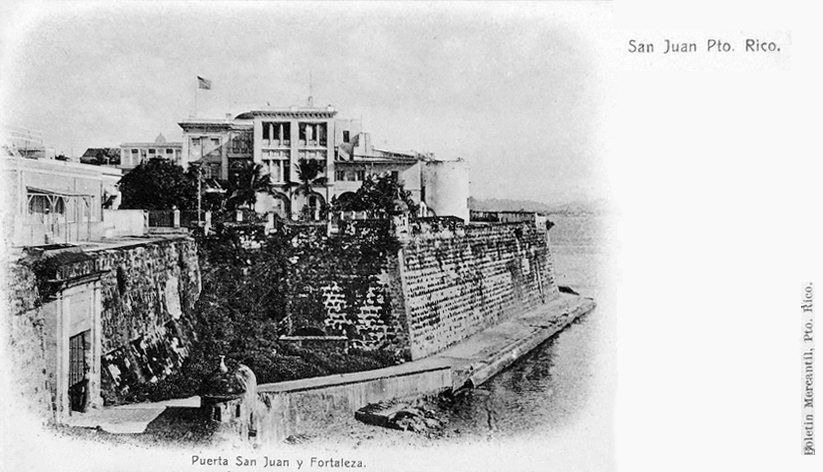
Postcard from San Juan, Puerto Rico.

Between 1940 and 1945, Zambrano taught courses, seminars and lecture series at various Cuban and Puerto Rican institutions. On the island of Puerto Rico, she befriended Luis Muñoz Marín, the first democratically elected governor on the island and his wife Ines María Mendoza, and taught classes in the University of Puerto Rico, Río Piedras. In Puerto Rico, Zambrano wrote an essay "La isla de Puerto Rico: Nostalgia y esperanza de un mundo mejor" ("The Island of Puerto Rico: Nostalgia and Hope for a Better World," 1940) which had an influence on the Constitution of the Commonwealth of Puerto Rico (1952). In Havana, Cuba — which Zambrano called her “prenatal homeland” — she was close friends with the poet José Lezama Lima, and integrated into a circle of poets who collaborated in the journal Orígenes. In these years, Zambrano wrote books and articles across philosophy, history, and literary theory. La agonía de Europa (The Agony of Europe, 1945) reflects on the crisis of European civilization, shaped by her experience of war and exile; La confesión: género literario y método (Confession: literary genre and method, 1943) examines confession as a method of writing that traces the path by which life draws closer to truth, and El pensamiento vivo de Séneca (The Living Thought of Seneca, 1944) bridges ancient Stoic philosophy and the anxieties of modernity, showing how Seneca's thought continues to offer guidance in times of crisis.

World War II (1939-1945) kept Zambrano separated from her mother and sister Araceli, who were stuck in Nazi-occupied Paris. In 1942, Araceli's partner, Manuel Muñoz Martínez, was extradited to Franco's Spain and executed by a firing squad for his role in the Republic. Araceli herself was physically and psychologically tortured by the Gestapo. Haunted by her sister, Zambrano began an intensive study of Sophocles's tragedy Antigone, keeping a series of notebooks of her reflections on the play. She wrote that she imagined Araceli in dreams as a modern Antigone; that she felt the voice of Antigone speaking through her. Years later, Zambrano would publish La tumba de Antígona (Antigone's Tomb, 1967), a literary-philosophical reimagination of Antigone through the prism of the Spanish Civil War.

==== America, Havana, Rome, Paris ====
After World War II ended in 1945, Zambrano applied for one of the first visas to return to France, hoping to reunite with her mother and sister. She spent several months in New York City waiting for the visa to be processed, finally arriving in Paris on September 6, 1946 — two days after her mother had died. She found her sister severely traumatized, and from that point on committed herself to her care, remaining by her side for the rest of their lives together.

In 1948, the Zambrano sisters moved to Havana, then to Mexico and back to Havana. As their financial situation grew increasingly difficult, and they decided to return to Europe. In 1949, the sisters settled in Rome until June 1950, when the Italian government refused to renew their residence permits. They moved to Paris, where Zambrano was reunited with her husband, from whom she soon separated and later divorced. During this period, she spent time in existentialist circles and became friends with the philosopher Albert Camus. In 1951, Camus wrote in a letter to Zambrano: "In fact, I find myself very close, though in a non-religious context, to what you think and express so beautifully," and later offered to help her publish a French translation of her book El hombre y lo divino (The Human and the Divine), suggesting the title L'Absence ("The Absence") for the manuscript.

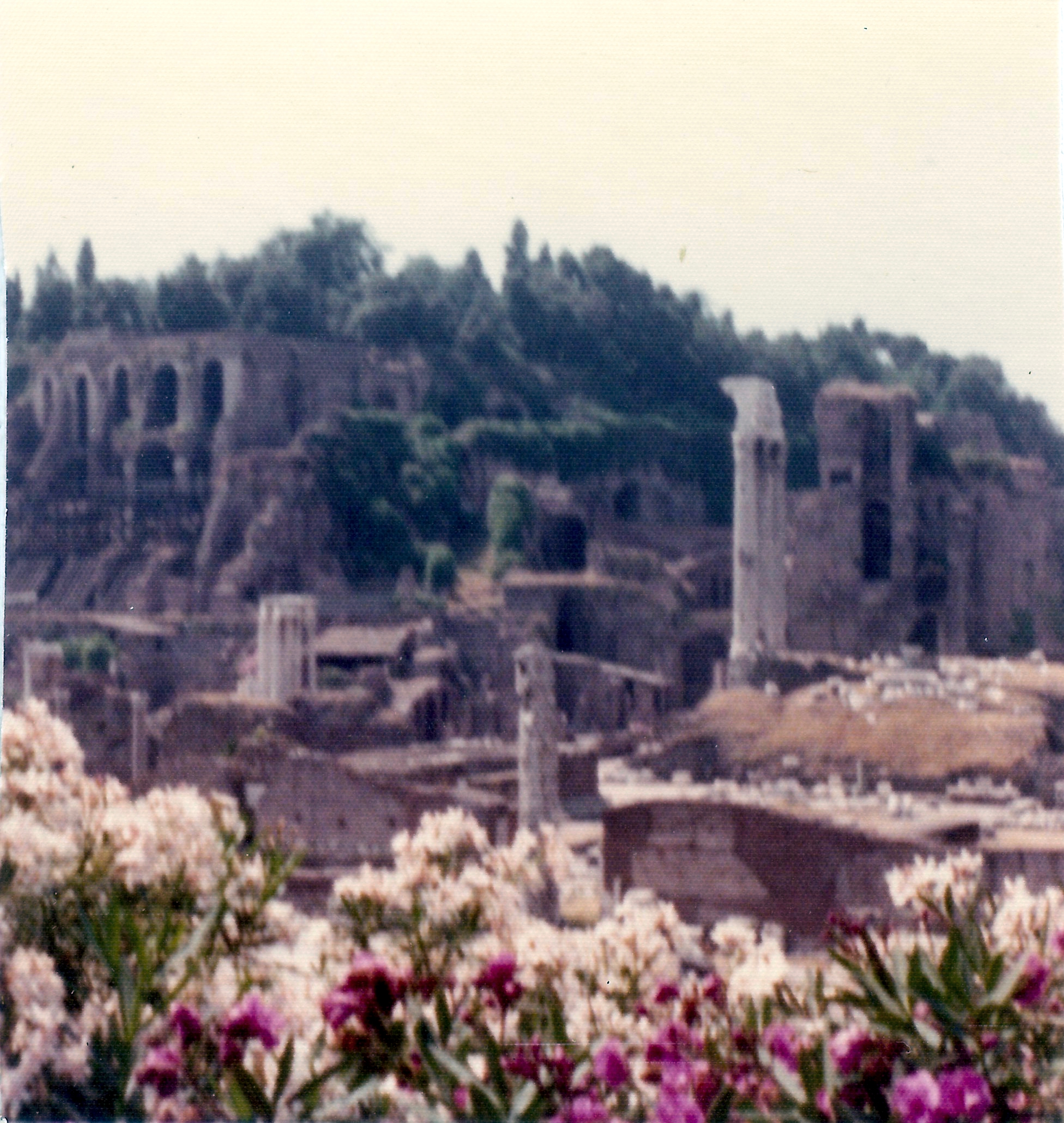
Ruins in Rome, Italy in the mid-20th century

From 1953 to 1963, the sisters based themselves in Rome, Italy, during which Zambrano integrated into Italian intellectual circles and wrote prolifically. Her Roman home was known for its gatherings, its singing and dancing, and its overflowing population of cats. In Rome, Zambrano wrote some of her most important works. El hombre y lo divino (The Human and the Divine, 1955) traces humanity's relationship with the sacred across time, from Greek and Roman gods through Christianity through Nietzsche's "death of God" and the modern age. Persona y democracia (Person and Democracy, 1958) searches for an ethical foundation for democracy, defining it as a society in which one must truly be a person — a being recognized in their dignity, responsibility, and relational existence. Los sueños y el tiempo (Dreams and Time, written 1955–1960) explores the philosophical dimensions of dreaming and the different registers of time that sleep and waking open up. El sueño creador (The Creative Dream, 1965) explores creative dreaming as a path to philosophical insight. Zambrano also published the essay Carta sobre el exilio (Letter on Exile, 1961), a letter to an imaginary reader that meditates on the condition of exile as both a political reality and an internal state of being.

In September, 1963, an expulsion order for the Zambrano sisters from the city of Rome was signed by a senator with a fascist past. Through the mediation of Elena Croce, the Ministers of Justice and the Interior became involved, delaying the proceedings. In September, 1964, the Zambranos left Rome for France.

==== La Pièce ====
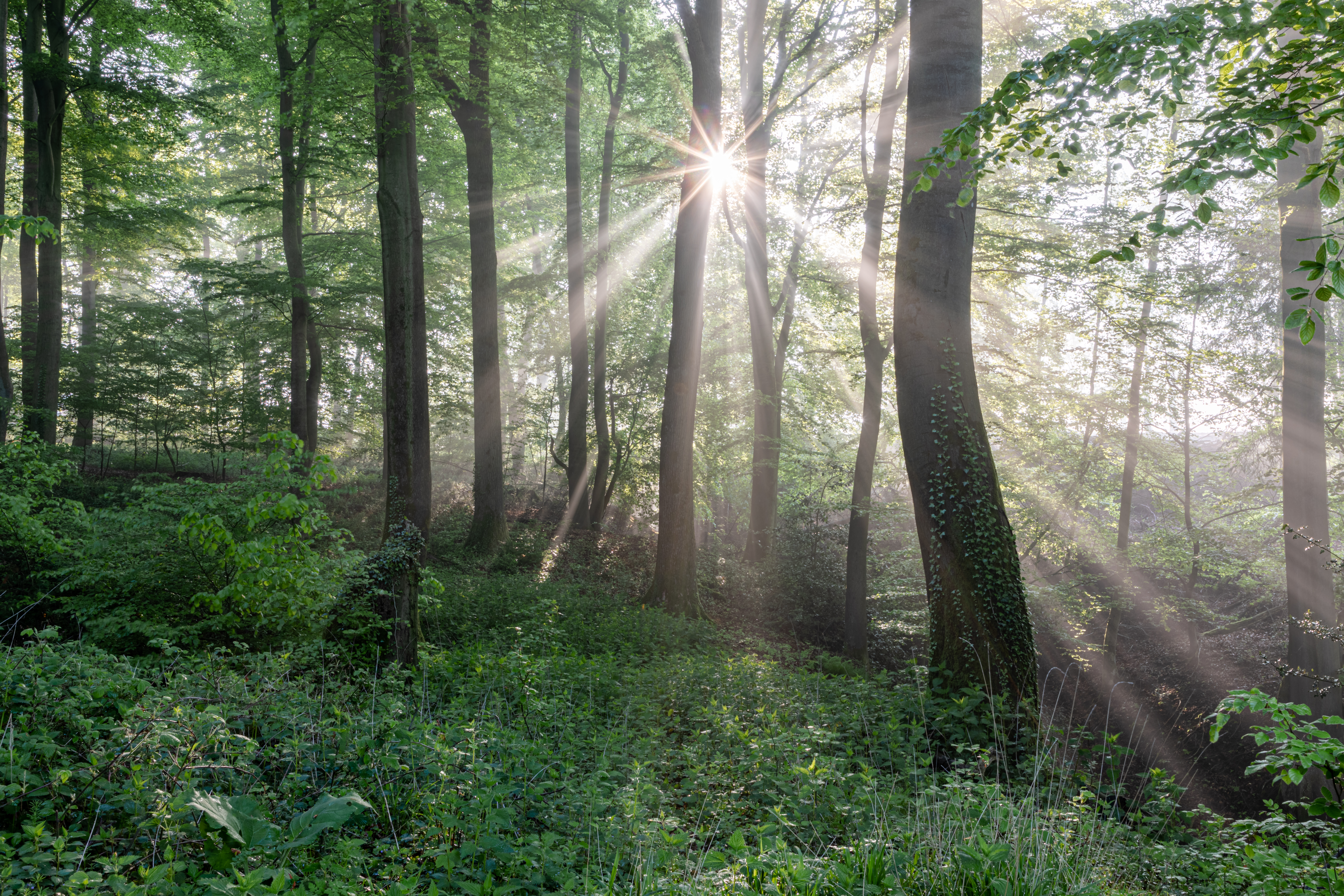
A forest, one of the central images of Zambrano's book Claros del bosque

Zambrano then settled in a small rural cottage in La Pièce, in the French Jura countryside. Although friends and family continued to visit her, these years were marked by the full weight of exile—loneliness, material hardship, grief, and profound suffering. Yet, she continued to write, and it was here that her philosophy reached one of its fullest expressions in what many consider her masterpiece, Claros del bosque (Forest Clearings 1977), a series of lyrical meditations on light, silence, and the hidden places where thought and being converge.

During these years, Zambrano cared for her sister, whose health steadily declined and who continued to suffer hallucinations and deliriums from the torture she had endured by the Nazis in Paris. Araceli died on February 20, 1972, a loss that devastated Zambrano. Unable to remain in La Pièce, she left the house and did not return for two years, spending time with friends in Rome and Greece. She returned in 1974, accompanied by her cousins Mariano and Rafael Tomero. In 1978, she moved to Ferney-Voltaire, where she lived for two years before settling in Geneva in 1981. There she was named an Honorary Daughter of the Principality of Asturias, the first of a long series of honors through which Spain gradually began to recognize one of its greatest living philosophers.

=== Return to Spain ===
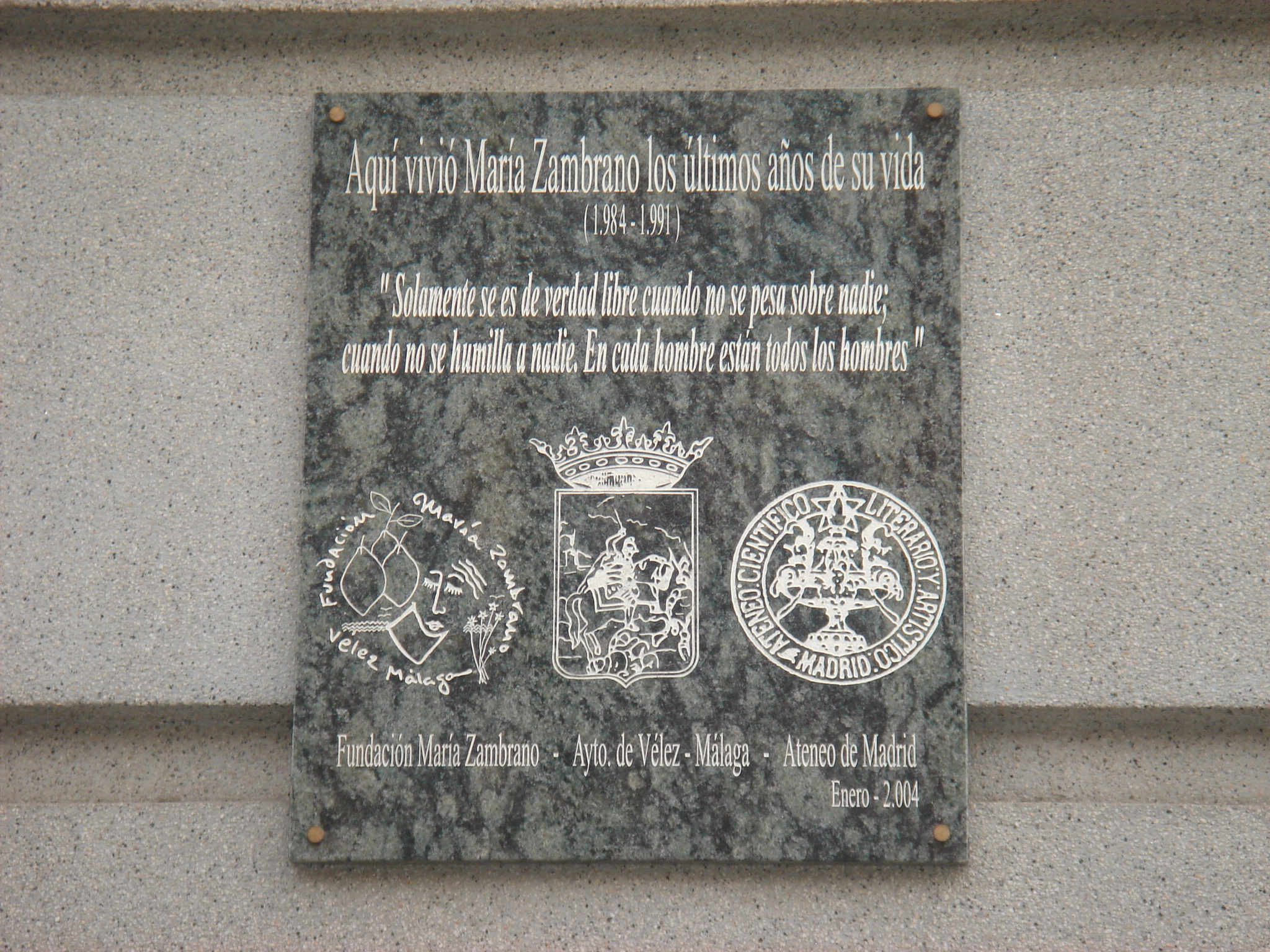
A commemorative plaque on Calle Antonio Maura, 14, Madrid; the apartment where Zambrano lived in the final years of her life

On November 20, 1984, Zambrano returned to Spain with the help of a group of young intellectuals, where the new democratic government supported her and established her in Madrid. There, her apartment became a gathering place for intellectuals, artists, poets, students, and admirers from all walks of life. The writer Clara Janés recalls that Zambrano guided these conversations “as one would imagine Socrates might have done.” In 1987, with the support of the city council of her hometown Vélez-Málaga, Zambrano helped guide the creation of the María Zambrano Foundation, a cultural institute dedicated to editing and spreading her work, and to housing her personal library and archive. With the foundation, she worked to recover previously unpublished texts, including De la Aurora (Of the Dawn, 1986), a literary-philosophical meditation on dawn, revelation, and the emergence of consciousness; Delirio y destino: los veinte años de una española (Delirium and Destiny: A Spaniard in her Twenties, 1989), an autobiographical reflection on the interplay of personal destiny and historical catastrophe; Algunos lugares de la pintura (Some Places of Painting, 1989), a collection of essays on painting as a mode of knowledge; Notas de un método (Notes of a Method, 1989), an exploration of the method of “poetic reason” and the relation between thought, feeling, and life; Los bienaventurados (The Blessed, 1990), an inquiry into exile, transcendence, and the figures who dwell beyond history; and Los sueños y el tiempo (Dreams and Time, 1992).

In this final stage of her life, Zambrano devoted herself to writing and to participating in Spain's intellectual and cultural life. She was interviewed several times on national television and, in her acceptance speech for the Miguel de Cervantes Prize in 1988, returned to one of the defining images of her philosophy, the dawn, a symbol of human renewal and the possibility of new beginnings. Zambrano never renounced her condition as an exile, writing: “I do not conceive my life without the exile I have lived. (...) Exile has been like my homeland.”

In one of her final essays, “Los peligros de la paz” (“The Dangers of Peace,” 1990), published during the Gulf War, Zambrano reflects on the meaning of peace. Although peace is almost universally desired, she argues that it is too often reduced to the mere absence of war. Peace, she suggests, is not a neutral condition but an active way of being that must be continually cultivated. It is “a way of living, a way of inhabiting the planet, a way of being human”—the very condition that makes fully human life possible.

Zambrano died on February 6, 1991, and was buried in the cemetery of Vélez-Málaga. Inscribed on her tombstone is a verse from the Song of Songs: Surge amica mea et veni (“Arise, beloved, and come”).

== Philosophy ==
María Zambrano's thought is a profound effort to reconcile philosophical reason with lived experience — to rescue forms of knowledge relegated to the shadows and to attend to the fragile dimensions of the human being. She sought to descend into what she called the entrañas: the deepest, visceral depths of the person. Her thought is one of love and openness to the creative possibilities of the future, animated by a desire to expand the boundaries of Western rationalism and recover what it had left behind. Some of her most important philosophical influences and interlocutors include Plato, Aristotle, the pre-Socratics, Seneca, Augustine, Descartes, Spinoza, Nietzsche, Heidegger, and Husserl; and in the Spanish tradition, Miguel de Unamuno, José Ortega y Gasset, Miguel de Cervantes, Benito Perez Galdós, Santa Teresa de Jesús and San Juan de la Cruz. Resisting disciplinary boundaries, Zambrano wrote across philosophy, poetry, literary criticism, art, memoir, and drama.

=== Why We Write ===
In her essay "Por qué se escribe" (“Why We Write”, 1934), Zambrano writes that “To write is to defend the solitude in which one dwells.” Writing, she explains, is an act of fidelity to lived experience: “One certainly does not write for literary need, but for the need that life has to express itself.” What is lived is often incommunicable or obscure in the moment; writing creates a necessary distance, giving form to life without exhausting its mystery. Writing, Zambrano says, allows hidden dimensions of reality to reveal themselves through the gradual emergence of truth.

=== Poetic Reason ===
Zambrano's most famous contribution to the history of ideas is her method of poetic reason (Spanish: razón poética), an effort to broaden the scope of Western rationality by reintegrating elements that modernity had pushed into the shadows: imagination, emotion, intuition, interiority, dreams, and poetry. With a double root in both Greek logos and poiesis, poetic reason spirals into the dark, interior dimensions of existence — the realm of feeling, of the visceral, of what is most difficult to bring to the light of reason — to give it voice. For Zambrano, “to think is to decipher what one feels.” Her method does not reject reason, but hopes to expand it.

Philosophy and poetry, in this framework, are not opposing disciplines but two halves of the human being, long divided and held in tension — a division she traced back to Plato's expulsion of the poets in the Republic. Much of Zambrano's work can be understood as an effort to heal this wound. Through metaphor and the creative possibilities of language, she approached dimensions of existence that resist purely analytical expression, transforming words like despertar (awakening), ensoñar (daydreaming), delirio (delirium), and aurora (dawn) into philosophical symbols, developing a vocabulary she hoped to be capable of responding to a civilization in crisis.

=== The Dawn ===
Among the recurring images of Zambrano's philosophy, the aurora (dawn) serves as both a symbol of and a model for poetic reason. Against the dominant metaphor of Western philosophy — from Plato's Sun to the Enlightenment's ideal of complete illumination — Zambrano proposes instead the hesitant first glimpse of dawn in the early morning as a new model for knowledge: a gradual emergence into understanding characterized by patience and attentiveness. Throughout her work, the dawn is a "maternal" force that signifies both the continual rebirth of the human person and a mode of knowing that arrives slowly and tenderly, always on the threshold of becoming.

=== The Person ===
At the center of Zambrano's thought is her concept of the person (Spanish: persona), developed most fully in Persona y democracia (Person and Democracy, 1958). At once a social, political, and philosophical category, it draws on the Greek and Roman traditions of civic life, and on personalist and phenomenological currents of twentieth-century European thought, but ultimately becomes a concept distinctly her own. The person, for Zambrano, is singular, a "someone" constituted by relationships, inner life, and responsibility toward others — and something more than the isolated, abstract liberal "individual," carrying both a unique identity and an ethical dimension. Prior to the many categories that divide human beings — class, gender, race, and religion among them — the person constitutes a more fundamental human reality; these distinctions, however historically significant, belong to a secondary plane, irreducible to the condition of personhood. The person is also a fundamentally unfinished being; it lives in constant search and transformation, oriented toward freedom, truth and transcendence, always reaching toward what it has not yet become and toward the other.

==== The Character ====
Zambrano posits the person in contrast to the character (Spanish: personaje), which is a rigid, tragic "mask" behind which the human person is alienated; behind which they can commit violence or dominate others without feeling responsible, surrendering individual conscience to a fixed role, a political ideology, or a collective identity that absolves them of moral accountability.

=== Political Thought: Liberalism, Democracy, The City ===
Zambrano maintained strong civic commitments throughout her life and work. In her first book, Horizonte del liberalismo (The Horizon of Liberalism, 1930), she argues that while many have taken liberalism to be obsolete and dead, no longer serving life, what it really needs is a renovation, a new grounding in a fuller reality of human life. In Persona y democracia (Person and Democracy, 1958), Zambrano asks: What is democracy? What has democracy meant historically, and what unrealized meanings or possibilities might lie within it? She develops an ethical foundation for democracy, defining it as “a society in which it is not only permitted, but required, to be a person.”

The city is central to Zambrano's political thought. In her articles "La ciudad: creación histórica" ("The city: historical creation," 1964) and "La ciudad" ("The city," 1960), she contemplates the true city as a creative space of participation, where people appear before one another, form relationships, and take part in shared public life — and reflects on how this has been diminished in modernity, as citizens have given way to abstract subjects of the State.

=== Crisis ===
In essays such as "La vida en crisis" ("Life in Crisis," 1934) and "La crisis de la cultura en Occidente," ("The crisis of Western culture," 1949) Zambrano understands a crisis to be the moment — whether personal or historical — when structures and frameworks that once sustained life cease to function, leaving it without footing or reference points. Writing against the backdrop of the destruction of the twentieth century and what many saw as a broader crisis of Western civilization, Zambrano insists that every crisis carries a positive dimension: with life stripped of its usual supports, it becomes possible to search more honestly for the “roots” of the human being, and for truth and possibility. The true danger, for Zambrano, lies not the crisis itself, which is inherent to the human condition, but the failure to enter into it, to let it pass by unexamined.

=== Exile ===
In Zambrano's philosophy, exile, more than a historical condition, becomes an ontological human state of being continually in transit, in search of one's place. This vision finds one of its most powerful literary expressions in La tumba de Antígona (Antigone's Tomb, 1967), in which Zambrano reimagines Antigone’s fate. Rather than committing suicide, Zambrano’s Antigone, in exile in her tomb, undergoes a kind of literary resurrection, inhabiting the threshold between life and death. For further discussion on exile, see Zambrano’s "Carta sobre el exilio" (“Letter on Exile”, 1961) essay "Amo mi exilio" ("I Love My Exile," 1989) as well as the book Expressive Subjectivity: María Zambrano’s Ontology of Exile.

=== Poetic-Artistic Elements ===
For Zambrano, metaphor is a philosophical instrument for holding meanings that resist reduction to conceptual terms. She finds a capacity in the image to sustain contradictions and approach dimensions of reality inaccessible to discursive thought. In Algunos lugares de la pintura (Some Places of Painting, 1989), Zambrano extends this understanding to the visual arts, exploring how painting can open spaces for contemplation and revelation.

=== Love and Piety ===
Central to Zambrano's ethics is her concept of piety (Spanish: piedad), which, while drawing on Plato's Euthyphro and the Christian tradition, becomes something distinctly her own. Piety, in Zambrano’s thought, is "knowing how to engage with what is different, with what is radically other than ourselves,” to effectively engage with what is categorically other — for example, with the dead, the sick, animals, nature, the divine, the stranger — with attentiveness, tenderness, emotion, delirium, and dreams as much as reason. Zambrano is critical of modern tolerance as a form of avoidance, a distancing from what one would rather not encounter, and likewise of the broader “spectacle” of contemporary society in its failure to make room for genuine engagement with those of other races, nationalities, cultures, social classes, religions, and economic positions. She critiques a society in which “we barely know how to deal with anyone except those who are almost replicas of ourselves”. Where modern man seeks the “mirror” of his own reflection in the world and destroys what withholds it, Zambrano’s piety demands engagement and communication with the other on its own terms.

Love operates alongside piety as its animating force. Drawing on Diotima's account of love in Plato’s Symposium, Spinoza’s concept of love in the Ethics, and on studies of both Christian and Islamic mysticism, Zambrano understood love as the restlessness at the heart of the person: a force that projects outward without limit, oriented not toward possession but toward an ever-renewed encounter with what lies beyond the self. Love is also a creative and epistemic force — it drives knowledge and opens the future as a force of creation and possibility.

Together, for Zambrano, piety and love are epistemological and ethical stances; the conditions under which openness to the world becomes possible.

=== Education ===
Zambrano's concern with education runs throughout her work, rooted in her early engagement with Spain's reformist pedagogy and her years of teaching. She also published many articles on education, about the vocation of the teacher, the student-teacher relationship, and the space of the classroom. For Zambrano, education is an awakening of the student's inner life toward self-knowledge, vocation, ethical life, and truth, in which the teacher “mediates” or “guides” rather than imposes. She also writes that "to educate is to guide those who are beginning to live on their responsible journey through time," as time is the fundamental medium of human life. The classroom is an open space where time is empty, free, not directed toward external productivity but toward "the search for truth." Likewise, the person, for Zambrano, must have a "time of their own," a time for themselves within the multiplicity of times.

In an interview at the end of her life, Zambrano said that her true condition had always been that of a student, and that she would die a student, a student of philosophy, because she could not be anything else.

== Works ==
- Horizonte del liberalismo (The Horizon of Liberalism *, 1930) – A book of political philosophy examining the shortcomings of liberalism and the possibilities for its renewal.
- "Por qué se escribe" ("Why We Write", 1934) – An essay on writing and its relationship to thought, life, and truth.
- "Hacia un saber sobre el alma" ("Toward a Knowledge of the Soul," 1934) – A philosophical exploration of the inner life.
- Los intelectuales en el drama de España (Intellectuals in the Drama of Spain *, 1937) – On the ethical responsibilities of the intellectual in times of historical crisis, as a response to the Spanish Civil War.
- Filosofía y poesía (Philosophy and Poetry *, 1939) – Traces philosophy and poetry as two ways of inhabiting reality, whose divergence in Western thought Zambrano takes as her point of departure.
- Pensamiento y poesía en la vida española (Thought and Poetry in Spanish Life *, 1939) – On how the interplay of thought and poetic sensibility has shaped Spanish cultural identity.
- Isla de Puerto Rico. Nostalgia y esperanza de un mundo mejor (The Island of Puerto Rico: Nostalgia and Hope for a Better World *, 1940) – On the island as a magnet for the philosophical imagination, the meaning of democracy, and the role of Puerto Rico in the Americas.
- La confesión, género literario y método (Confession as a Literary Genre and Method, 1943; English translation 2015) – Explores confession as a literary genre and philosophical tool through which the individual reveals their interiority and reaches from lived experience towards truth.
- El pensamiento vivo de Séneca (The Living Thought of Seneca *, 1944) – On Seneca as a living guide for enduring suffering, exile, and political crisis with dignity.
- La agonía de Europa (The Agony of Europe *, 1945) – A diagnosis of Europe's spiritual and cultural crisis after the Second World War.
- Delirio y destino (Delirium and Destiny, written 1953; published 1989; English translation 1999) – A hybrid of memoir, lyrical novel and philosophical reflection that traces both Zambrano's own personal intellectual formation and the historical forces that drove her generation into exile.
- La España de Galdós (The Spain of Galdós *, 1960) – A philosophical reading of Galdós's novels, centered on Misericordia as a moral and political argument and a vindication of the feminine.
- Los sueños y el tiempo (Dreams and Time *, 1960) – Explores dreams and non-linear time as privileged modes of philosophical knowledge.
- "Carta sobre el exilio" ("Letter on Exile," 1961) – An essay on exile as a philosophical condition.
- El hombre y lo divino (The Human and the Divine *, 1st ed. 1955; 2nd expanded ed. 1973) – Traces humanity's relationship with the sacred over time, from Greek and Roman gods through Christianity through Nietzsche's death of God and modernity.
- Persona y Democracia (Person and Democracy *, 1958; reissued 1988) – On democracy as the only political system capable of moving beyond a "sacrificial history" that requires victims and idols.
- España, sueño y verdad (Spain: Dream and Truth *, 1965) – On Spain as both historical reality and mythical projection, viewed from exile.
- El sueño creador (The Creative Dream *, 1965) – Explores the dream as a cognitive and creative mode of knowledge.
- La tumba de Antígona (Antigone's Tomb, 1967; English translation 2025) – A literary-philosophical reimagination of the Antigone myth as a meditation on exile.
- Claros del bosque (Forest Clearings *, 1977) – A poetic-philosophical masterpiece about moments of stillness and openness in which being and truth reveal themselves.
- Los bienaventurados (The Blessed *, 1979) – On the insufficiency of modern philosophy and the regenerative power of silence, suffering, and the mystical tradition.
- Dos fragmentos sobre el amor (Two Fragments on Love *, 1982) – Two meditations on love as a philosophical and existential experience
- Andalucía, sueño y realidad (Andalusia: Dream and Reality *, 1984) – On Andalusia as a place where the real and the poetically imagined are inseparable.
- De la aurora (Of the Dawn *, 1986) – The aurora as a metaphor for a humble, non-totalizing reason that lets reality reveal itself gradually.
- Notas de un método (Notes on a Method *, 1989) – A musically structured articulation of her philosophical method and poetic reason as both a mode of thought and a way of life.
- “Para una historia de la piedad” (“Toward a History of Piety” *, 1989) – An explanation of Zambrano’s concept of piety.
- "Los peligros de la paz" ("The Dangers of Peace" *, 1990) – An essay reflecting on the difference between the absence of war and a true state of peace, published during the Gulf War.
- Unamuno (Unamuno, * written 1940; published 2003) – A philosophical portrait of Miguel de Unamuno written in early exile, examining his thought on tragedy and the Spanish condition.
- Filosofía y educación: manuscritos (Philosophy and Education: Manuscripts *, posthumous collection published 2007) – Collected articles and essays on the relationship between philosophical thought and education.
- Algunos lugares de la pintura (Some Places of Painting *, published posthumously in 2012) – Essays on painting as a mode of philosophical revelation.

* = text has not yet been translated to English

=== Correspondences and archive ===
Zambrano's letters are literary and philosophical works in their own right and complement her published thought. Many of these correspondences have been collected and published posthumously in Spanish, including volumes with José Ferrater Mora, Ramón Gaya, Reyna Rivas, Enrique de Rivas, Gregorio del Campo, Pablo de Andrés Cobos, Alfons Roig, Augustín Andreu, and others. The María Zambrano Foundation archive also houses over 5,000 letters to and from Zambrano, with correspondents including Antonio Machado, Miguel de Unamuno, Rosa Chacel, Octavio Paz, Albert Camus, Luis Cernuda, Alfonso Reyes, José Lezama Lima, Elena Croce, José Bergamín, and Rafael Dieste.

The archive also holds hundreds of articles that Zambrano published throughout her life, along with 564 manuscripts containing rough drafts, essays, sketches, and notes, and her personal library, whose inventories are available online.

=== Quotes ===
- "We leave the present only to fall into the unknown future, yet without forgetting the past; our soul is crossed by sediments of centuries, and the roots are greater than the branches that see the light. It is in the work of dawn, tragic yet auroral, in which the shadows of night begin to reveal their meaning and uncertain figures begin to unveil themselves to the light, the hour of light in which past and future converge."
- "The poet lives in love with the world, and his attachment to each thing and to its fleeting moment, to its multiple shadows, means nothing but the fullness of his love for integrity. The poet cannot renounce anything because the true object of his love is the world: the dream and its root, and the companions on the march of time."
- "One must fall asleep above, in the light. One must remain awake below, in the intraterrestrial, intracorporeal darkness of the various bodies that earthly human inhabits: that of the earth, that of the universe, and one’s own. There in "the depths," in the infernal regions, the heart keeps watch, unveils itself, rekindles itself from within. Above, in the light, the heart lets go, surrenders. It gathers itself. It falls at last into sleep, unburdened. In the welcoming light where no violence is suffered, for one has arrived there, at that light, without forcing any door — or even opening one — without having crossed thresholds of light and shadow, without effort and without protection."
- "If one were to define democracy, it could be done by saying that it is the society in which not only is it permitted, but it is required, to be a person."
- "One does not live in a house, but in a city. And this—that the human being should live in a city above all, and not merely in a house—seems to have been forgotten."
- "In the frequenting of classrooms... one was taught... to hear, to listen, to pay attention, to let time pass without noticing... to open oneself to the thought that seeks the truth."
- "The central passion of life is love."
- "One is truly free only when one weighs upon no one, when one humiliates no one. Within every person dwells all of humanity."

== Legacy ==
=== Awards and Recognition ===
Given Zambrano's many years in exile, the irregular publication of her writings, and the cultural repression of the Franco regime, her work was slow to receive recognition. In Spain, it was not until 1966 that one of the first articles about Zambrano was published: J. L. Aranguren's article "Los sueños de María Zambrano" (The Dreams of María Zambrano) in the Revista de Occidente.

In 1981, the Asturian community in Geneva named Zambrano an Honorary Daughter of the Principality of Asturias and she was awarded the Prince of Asturias Award for Communications and Humanities. In 1983, Malaga University named her Doctor honoris causa. In 1988, she became the first woman to be awarded the Miguel de Cervantes Prize, the highest literary honor in the Spanish language.

Among posthumous honors, Zambrano was named Favorite Daughter of the Province of Málaga in 2002. The central library of Philology and Law at the Compultense University of Madrid, her alma mater, is named after her, as well as the library of the Cervantes Institute in Rome, and various secondary schools. There are Maria Zambrano professorships in the University of Málaga and the National Autonomous University of Mexico. On April 28, 2017, the Segovia City Council unanimously approved granting Zambrano the title of Honorary Daughter of Segovia. The campus of the Universidad of Valladolid in Segovia is named after her as well.

=== Academic Legacy ===
Since 1990, the María Zambrano Foundation has organized international congresses on her life and work, held subsequently in 1994, 1998, 2004, 2008, 2019, and 2024.

The University of Barcelona hosts a monthly María Zambrano Seminar and an annual international congress on Zambrano and publishes a journal dedicated entirely to her called Aurora. The Compultense University of Madrid similarly maintains a seminar on Zambrano. The Maria Zambrano foundation publishes a journal on Zambrano called Antígona. In Spain alone, over 50 doctoral dissertations have been written on Zambrano in Spanish, with international scholarly interest continuing to grow. Her books have been translated into Italian, Portuguese, French, German, Dutch, Greek, Arabic, Chinese, and English, though many languages have only a small selection of her work and much remains to be translated.

Six volumes of Zambrano's Complete Works, edited by a team of scholars led by Mercedes Gómez Blesa and Jesús Moreno Sanz, have been published in the Galaxia Gutenberg editorial in Barcelona and two more volumes are in progress.

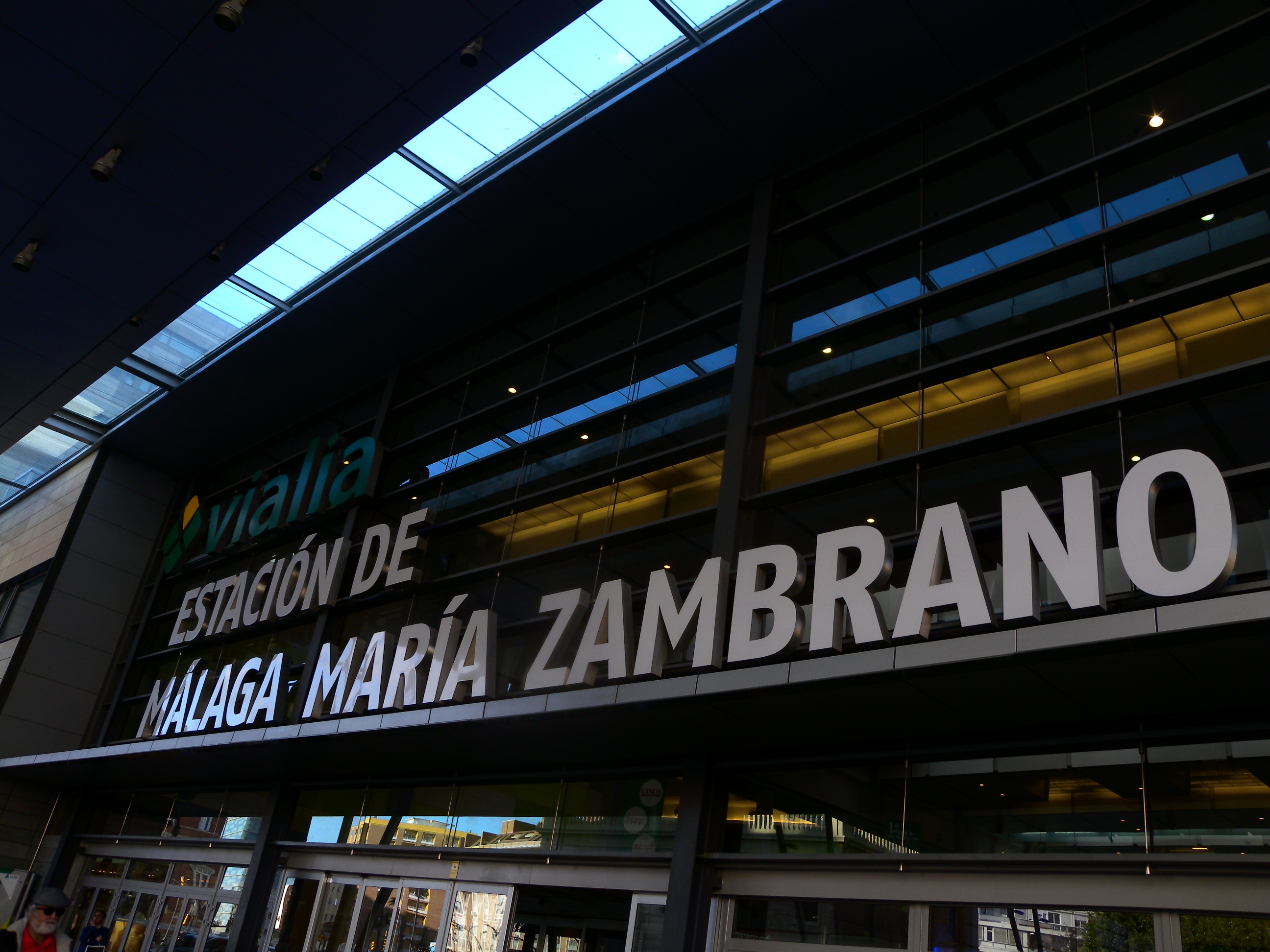
Málaga María Zambrano Train Station

=== In Popular Culture ===
On November 27, 2006, Renfe, Spain's state-owned national railway company, named the Málaga Maria Zambrano train station, one of the country's main stations, after her. In 2008, the maritime salvage tugboat María Zambrano (BS-22) was launched. There are streets named after María Zambrano in over 32 towns and cities across Spain — in Andalusia (Málaga, Granada, Córdoba, and Sevilla) and also in Madrid, Barcelona, Zaragoza, Valencia, León, Toledo, Badajoz, Murcia, the Canary Islands, and Asturias.

Several films have explored Zambrano's life and work, including María querida (Dearest María), directed by José Luis García Sánchez in 2004, and María Zambrano: el método de los claros (María Zambrano: the method of the clearings), directed by José Manuel Mouriño in 2019. In 2022, La tumba de Antígona (Antigone's Tomb) was performed in Spain at the International Festival of Classical Theater in Mérida.

Many public art installations commemorate Zambrano, including these:

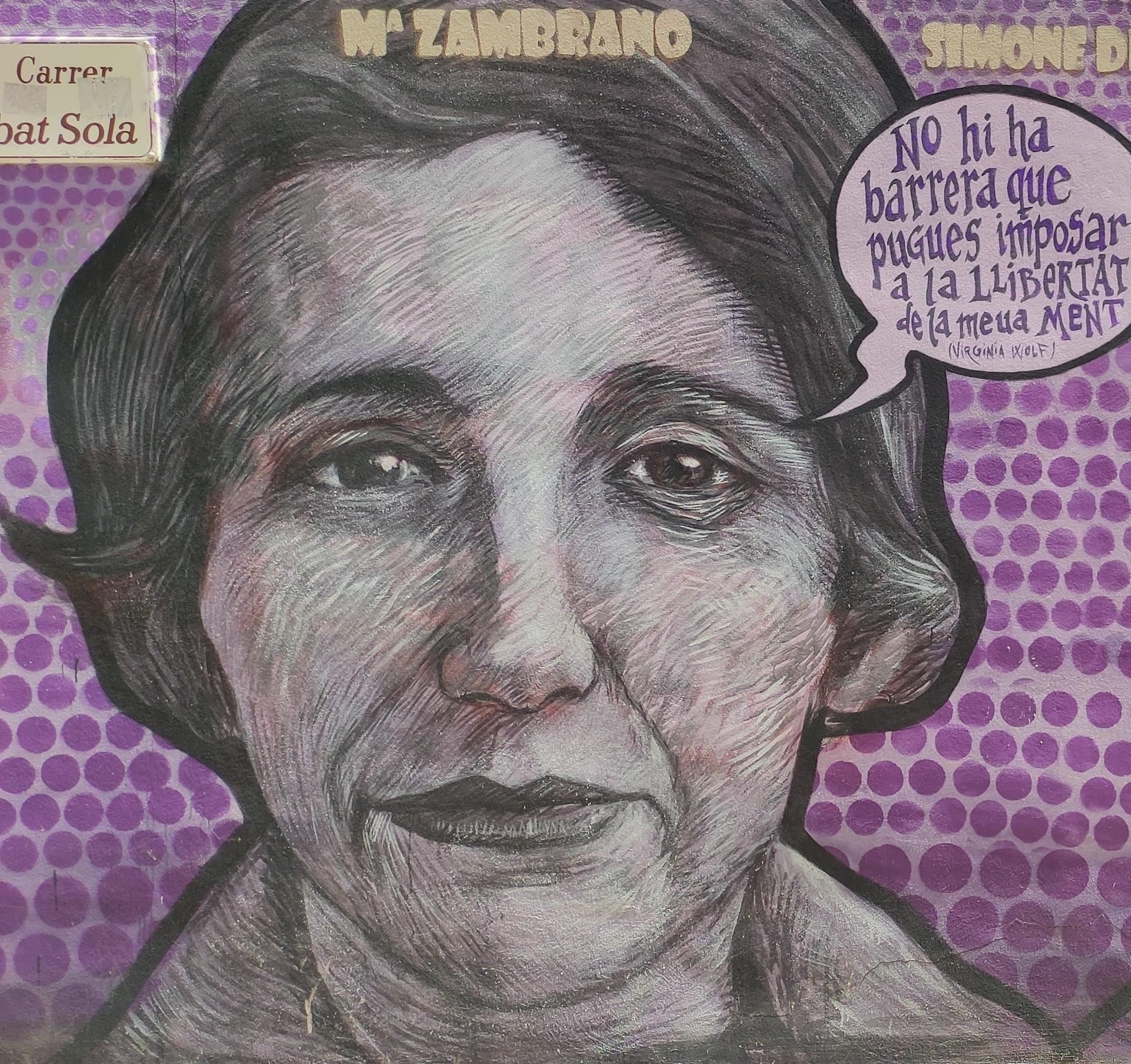
Mural of María Zambrano in Gandia, Spain

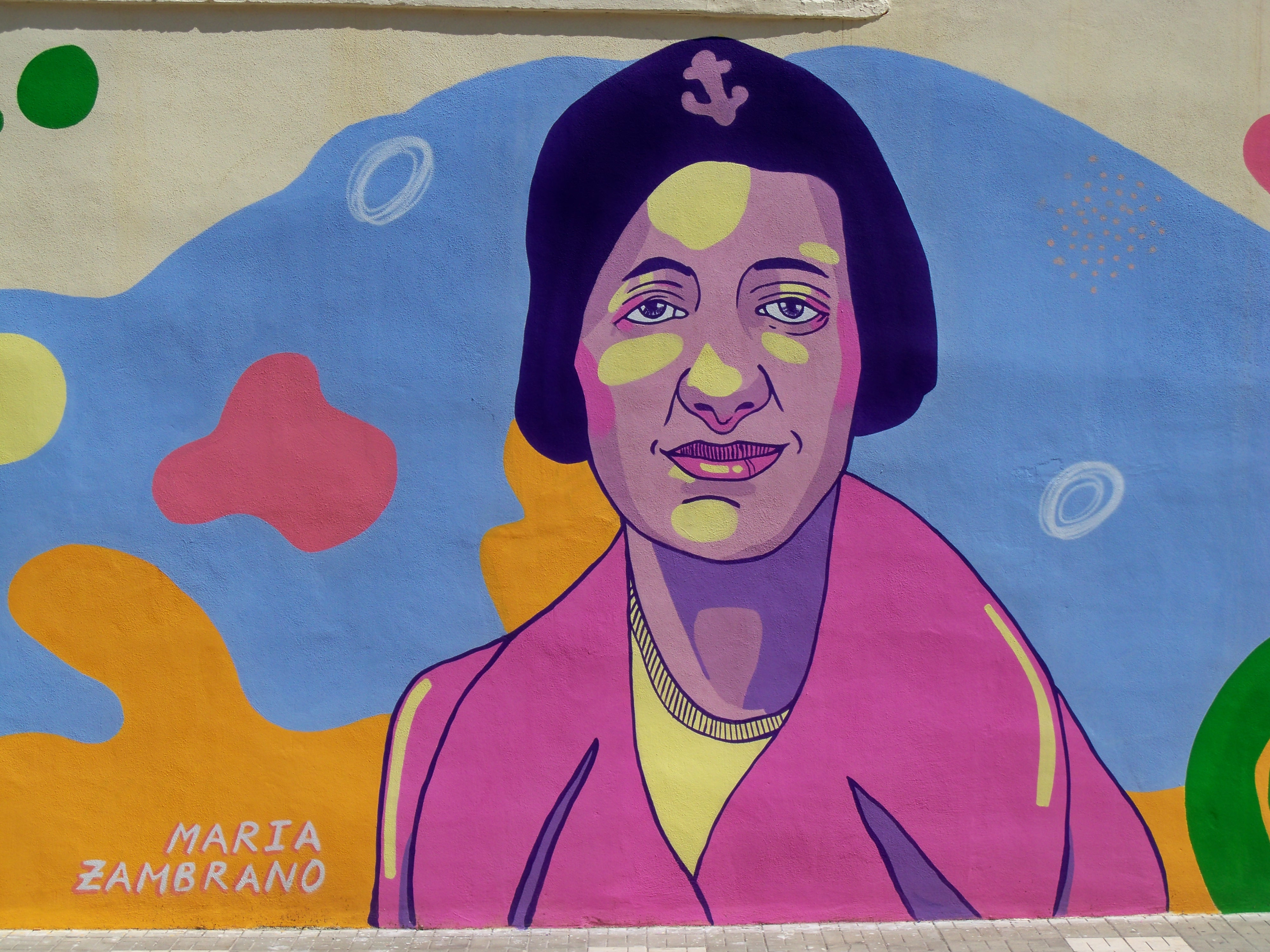
Mural of María Zambrano at the Miguel de Cervantes School

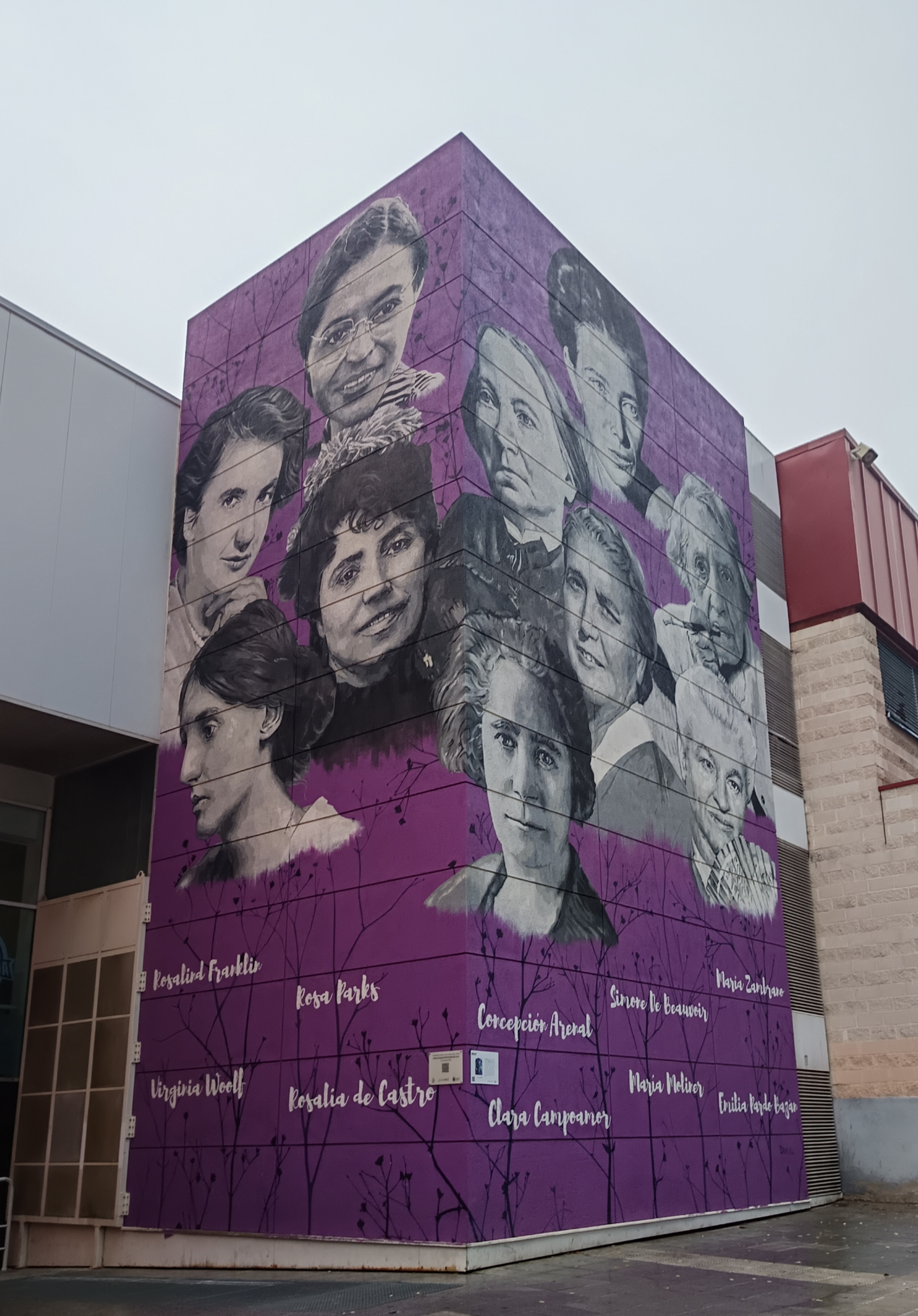
Mural of female historical figures including Zambrano, Woolf, de Beauvoir, and Rosa Parks in Fuenlabrada, Madrid.

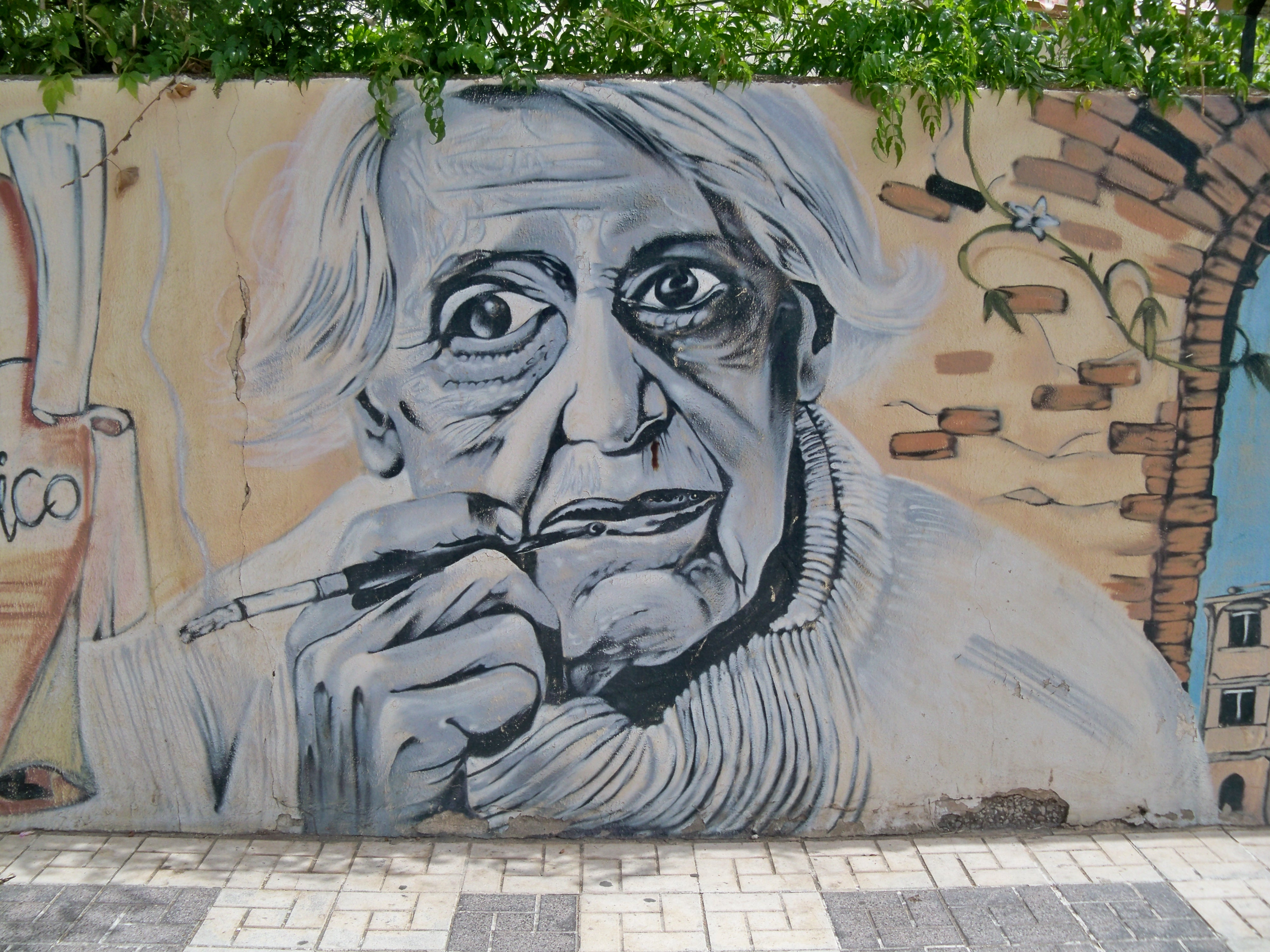
Mural of María Zambrano in Bolivia Street, Málaga

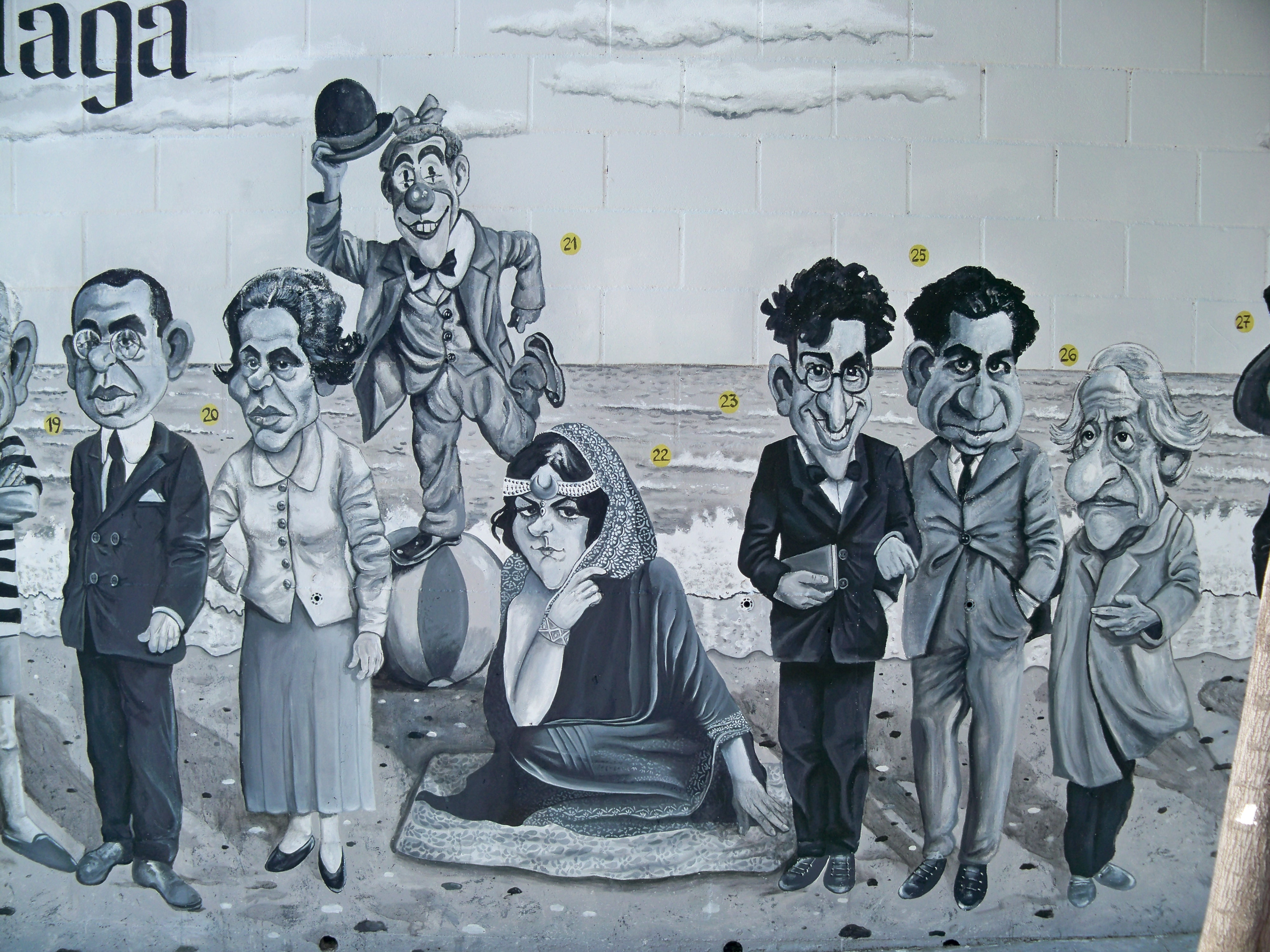
A mural in Málaga of 30 historical figures including Zambrano

== See also ==
- Women in philosophy
- List of women philosophers
- Spanish republican exile
- Generation of '27
- School of Madrid

== English Language Bibliography ==
The majority of Zambrano's work has not yet been translated into English, and scholarship on her in English remains limited. For Zambrano's complete primary texts, see the Cervantes Institute catalogue and her Obras completas (Galaxia Gutenberg). For further primary and secondary bibliography, see the Spanish-language version of this article.

=== Primary texts translated into English ===
- Zambrano, María. Delirium and Destiny: A Spaniard in Her Twenties. Translated by Carol Maier. Commentary by Roberta Johnson. Albany: SUNY Press, 1999. [Translation of Delirio y destino, written 1953, published 1989]
- Zambrano, María. Antigone's Tomb / La tumba de Antígona. Translated by Clare Nimmo. Aris & Phillips Hispanic Classics. Liverpool: Liverpool University Press, 2025. [Translation of La tumba de Antígona, 1967]
- Zambrano, María. Two Confessions. Zambrano's essay translated by Noël Valis; Rosa Chacel's essay translated by Carol Maier. Albany: SUNY Press, 2015. [Translation of La confesión: género literario]
- Zambrano, María. "Dreams and Time." In: Diogenes, Vol. 5, No. 19, 1957, 32-41.

=== Translated excerpts ===
- Balibrea, Mari Paz, Francis Lough, and Antolín Sánchez Cuervo, eds. "María Zambrano amongst the Philosophers." Special issue of History of European Ideas 44, no. 7 (2018). [Includes translated excerpts of Zambrano's texts alongside critical essays]
- Zambrano, María. "Two Essays on Ruins." Translated by José María Rodríguez García. Modernist Cultures 7, no. 1 (2012): 98–131.

=== Secondary literature ===
==== Books ====
- Caballero Rodríguez, Beatriz. María Zambrano: A Life of Poetic Reason and Political Commitment. Iberian and Latin American Studies. Cardiff: University of Wales Press, 2017.
- Cámara, Madeleine, and Luis Ortega Hurtado, eds. María Zambrano: Between the Caribbean and the Mediterranean. A Bilingual Anthology. Newark, DE: Juan de la Cuesta Hispanic Monographs, 2015.
- Enquist Källgren, Karolina. María Zambrano's Ontology of Exile: Expressive Subjectivity. Cham: Palgrave Macmillan, 2019.
- Moreno, Hugo. Rethinking Philosophy with Borges, Zambrano, Paz, and Plato. Continental Philosophy and the History of Thought. Lanham, MD: Lexington Books, 2022.
- Ros, Xon de, and Daniela Omlor, eds. The Cultural Legacy of María Zambrano. Studies in Hispanic and Lusophone Cultures 24. Cambridge: Legenda/MHRA, 2017.

==== Journal articles and book chapters ====
- Bush, Andrew. "María Zambrano and the Survival of Antigone." Diacritics 34, nos. 3–4 (2004): 90–111.
- Caballero Rodríguez, Beatriz. "Zambrano's Poetic Reason in the Light of Frankfurtian Critical Theory." History of European Ideas 44, no. 7 (2018): 887–898.
- Enquist Källgren, Karolina. "María Zambrano's Theory of Subjectivity and Modal Ontology." History of European Ideas 44, no. 7 (2018): 843–852.
- Enquist Källgren, Karolina, and Íngrid Vendrell Ferran. "Scheler and Zambrano: On a Transformation of the Heart in Spanish Philosophy." History of European Ideas 48, no. 5 (2022): 634–649.
- Johnson, Roberta. "María Zambrano's and Albert Camus's Communal Ethics." History of European Ideas 44, no. 7 (2018): 876–886.
- Palomar, Patricia. "The Reader of Confession in María Zambrano." History of European Ideas 44, no. 7 (2018): 853–863.
- Special Issue: María Zambrano In Dialogue. Journal of Spanish Cultural Studies 16, no. 4. http://www.tandfonline.com/toc/cjsc20/16/4.

=== Dissertations and Theses ===
==== On Zambrano ====
- Enquist Källgren, Karolina. "Subjectivity from Exile: Place and Sign in the Works of María Zambrano." PhD diss., University of Gothenburg, 2015. Gothenburg, Sweden.
- Nimmo, Clare Elizabeth. "La razón poética in the Works of María Zambrano." PhD diss., Durham University, 1994. Durham, England, UK.
- Cyganiak, Sarah J. "The Method of María Zambrano: An Analysis and Translated Selection of Essays Centered on the Concepts of the Word, the Person, Compassion and Love." PhD diss., University of Michigan, 2011. Ann Arbor, MI, USA.
- Guerrero Quintana, María Angélica. "Corazonar with/in María Zambrano: Insights into Crisis, Heart, and Hope." Master of Arts thesis, University of British Columbia, 2020. Vancouver, BC, Canada.

That include Zambrano

- Mollica, Veronica. "Out of Isolation: Life Writing in María Zambrano, Rosa Chacel and Felicidad Blanc." PhD diss., Queen's University Belfast, 2022. Belfast, Northern Ireland, UK.
- Gajic, Tatiana. "In Search of a Lost Nation: Intelectual Genealogies and Historical Revisions of the Reform of the Spanish Nation in José Ortega y Gasset, María Zambrano and Rosa Chacel." PhD diss., Duke University, 2001. Durham, NC, USA.
- Demeuse, Sarah. "Aesthetic Theory in 20th-Century Spain: 'Style' in José Ortega y Gasset, María Zambrano and Eugenio d'Ors." PhD diss., University of California, Berkeley, 2004. Berkeley, CA, USA.
