= Agustina González López =

Spanish writer and artist (1891–1936)

- Born: 4 April 1891; Granada, Spain
- Died: 1936 (aged 44–45); Viznar
- Known for: Painting, Writing
- Movement: Abstract art, Feminism

Agustina González López, also known as "La Zapatera" (born 4 April 1891 in Granada; died 1936 in Víznar, Granada province) was a Spanish writer and artist who belonged to the so-called Generation of '27. She contested the Spanish parliamentary elections in 1933 with her own party and was executed by Nationalist forces in 1936 at the beginning of the Spanish Civil War. Today she is considered a pioneer of Andalusian feminism and an avant-gardist, both politically and artistically.

== Introduction ==
During her lifetime, Agustina González López was known as an eccentric: Her nickname was "la Zapatera" (English: the Shoemaker) because her family owned a shoe store in Granada. She was a friend of Federico García Lorca, and contemporaries such as the writer Francisco Ayala described her as a "flamboyant figure, probably a madwoman":

"La Zapatera," Ayala wrote in his Relatos Granadinos, "wandered around a lot, entering cafés and restaurants, alone! and wrote absurd things, which she had printed and then offered for sale in the window of her shoe store."

After her execution in 1936, rumors circulated that she had been killed because she was "a whore" or "a lesbian". Her body was never identified and she was forgotten. She was rediscovered only in 2010, as part of a research project at the University of Granada not originally dedicated to her. Finally, in 2019, a biography of her was published in Spain, in which she is recognized as a feminist writer, artist, and politician.

== Life ==
Agustina González López was born in Granada on 4 April 1891. Her family had a shoe store at Calle Mesones No. 6. From the age of 7 to 9, she attended the Real Colegio in Granada as a boarding student, and she took an early interest in astronomy and medicine. Her father died when she was 13, and her two older brothers took over her education. To escape their control, she began disguising herself as a young man and going out alone at night. She was discovered, doctors diagnosed hysteria and prescribed strict bed rest. Facing punishment, Agustina González López claimed to suffer from "locura social" (social insanity).

Agustina González López was financially independent. She traveled alone and trained as a painter and engraver.

In 1916, at the age of 25, she published her first essay, Idearium Futurismo, and it was at this time that she met Federico García Lorca, who was inspired by her, not only for his play La Zapatera Prodigiosa, but also for the character of Amelia in his play The House of Bernarda Alba. "Amelia" was a name with which Agustina González López signed many of her drawings and watercolors.

She had contacts with Spanish suffragettes as early as the 1920s. When the Spanish feminist Elisa Soriano Fisher (1891-1964) asked her for her assessment of the situation regarding women's rights in Granada, she described it in a letter in January 1920 thus:

"I can only give you my own very humble and very frank opinion. The women in Grenada are backward and traditionalist, so it is useless to preach to them, and any modern and progressive movement scares them, I think they are carried away by the modern currents, but just carried away. I am disillusioned and it seems to me that I can make little difference here, I just lead by example, but they don't take it. My opinion on the two feminist congresses in Madrid: I think it's very good that both the Suffragettes Congress and the Congress organized by the Spanish feminists in honor of Concepción Arenal are taking place."

In 1927 and 1928 she published two more essays, Justificación (Justification), a kind of autobiography, and Las Leyes Secretas (The Secret Laws), in which she expounded her philosophy of life.

In 1933, she founded a political party called Entero Humanista, with which she contested the Spanish parliamentary elections and received 15 votes. The party program called for, among other things, a world without borders, a common currency, education for all, equal rights for nobility and proletariat, and social acceptance for marriages of same-sex partners.

In 1936, shortly after the start of the Spanish Civil War, Agustina González López was imprisoned in Granada and shot along with two other women in the nearby town of Viznar. Her exact date of death is not known, and the murderers were never identified. The Francoist Juan Luis Trescastro later boasted of having killed both her and Garcia Lorca, "him because he was a faggot and her because she was a whore.".

== Works ==
In 2019, three essays by Agustina González López were published as a book in Spain. During her lifetime she had her writings printed herself and sold them in her shoe store. Reviews of her first writing, Idearium Futurismo, appeared in the Spanish newspapers ABC and La Correspondencia de España in 1917.

=== Idearium Futurismo (1916) ===
In this essay, Agustina González López introduces a new kind of writing that she invented and calls "Futurismo." Her "Futurismo" abandons 7 letters of the Castilian alphabet (c, h, qu, v, x, y, z) and simplifies orthographic rules. To demonstrate the practicality of the new futuristic script, the essay itself is also futuristic, i.e., written in simplified Spanish:

"El sistema futurista de eskribir resuelve las difikultades ortográfikas por lo mismo que simplifika la Ortografía" (English: "The futurist writing system solves spelling difficulties by simplifying spelling").

The goal is to popularize writing, enabling even illiterate people to communicate their thoughts. Today, the writing designed by Agustina González López is considered an anticipation of those spellings that are common in (Spanish) short messages via SMS or WhatsApp.

=== Justificación (1927) ===
The essay Justificación is a kind of autobiography in which Agustina González López explains herself and responds to criticism of her behavior, which contemporaries considered scandalous. She was subjected to numerous hostilities in the conservative Granada of her time, not only because she went out alone and wore men's clothes, but also because she publicly stood up for her freedom and for the emancipation of women. She counters the accusation of being a madwoman thus:

"Social insanity consists in the fact that the person called insane is sane and the society in which he lives does not understand him and therefore misjudges him. ... This madness manifests itself in the error of others. And I have been suffering from this madness for 23 years."

In her essay, she describes herself as a feminist and claims to have paved the way for younger women:

"Little by little they gave me permission to go out on my own and wear whatever I wanted. [...] Now young ladies study, paint, write, work, go out alone and it's not frowned upon. I, who have always stepped out of line - you will not deny me that in many of these cases I have made the Christ."

Another subject of the essay is the question of why there are feminine men ("hombres afeminados") and masculine women ("mujeres masculinizadas")

=== Las Leyes Secretas (1928) ===
Agustina González López came into early contact with spiritual and theosophical movements that were fashionable at the beginning of the 20th century. In the essay Las Leyes Secretas (The Secret Laws), she tells how, as a hypnotist, she succeeded in capturing apparitions in watercolors and photogravures. According to her biographer Enriqueta Barranco Castillo, this makes her a pioneer of abstract art, similar to Georgiana Houghton (1814-1884) and Hilma af Klint (1862-1944)
