= Elisa Soriano Fisher =

Spanish teacher and ophthalmologist

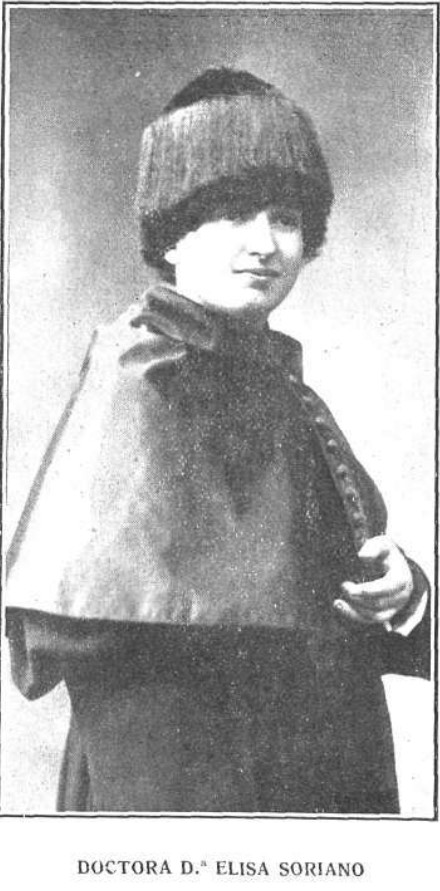
Photographic portrait of Dr. Elisa Soriano, 1919

Elisa Soriano Fisher (October 22, 1891 in Madrid – December 3, 1964 in Madrid) was a Spanish teacher and ophthalmologist. She founded the Asociación Nacional de Mujeres Españolas (ANME, National Association of Spanish Women) and was the president of the Juventud Universitaria Femenina (JUF, Female University Youth) association. She is considered a leading figure of universal suffrage and associative and intellectual feminism of the 1920s and 1930s, until the beginning of the Spanish Civil War.

== Biography ==
=== Early years ===
Elisa Soriano was born in Madrid on October the 22nd, 1891. Despite the scarcity of information available about her childhood, it is known that her mother was Enriqueta Fisher, who died before Elisa was 5 years old and that her father was José Soriano Surroca (1865-1938), a prominent gynecologist and academic from Madrid. Soriano lived in a period of upheaval in which several political changes took place in the 20th century Spain, such as the monarchy of Alfonso XIII, the dictatorship of Primo de Rivera, the Second Republic and Francoist Spain. Until the age of 13, Soriano studied at the San Luis de los Franceses School in Madrid. Then she continued her studies at the General and Technical Institute of Guadalajara and later at the Escuela Normal Superior de Maestras, where in 1912 she completed a Higher Degree in Teaching with an outstanding qualification. In 1913 she became a secretary of the Comisión de Reglamento de la Caja de Socorros bank and a member of the female's committee Comité Femenino de Higiene Popular in Madrid.

In 1914, shortly after women's access to the University was approved, Elisa enrolled in Medicine, being one of the first Spanish women to enter the higher education. Studying medicine and teaching at that time was a common practice among women of the time, because thanks to it they could secure a job in a much more favorable environment than that of doctors. In spite of being the only woman of the promotion of that year, she counted on the support of Sebastián Recasens, dean of Medicine and gynecologist. She chose ophthalmology as a specialty, which was also the specialty of Dr. Trinidad Arroyo, one of the three women who practiced medicine in the capital of Spain. In 1915, she worked as an auxiliary of the medical-school inspection of Madrid; a year later she was the first woman to request an assistant student to the Beneficiencia Provincial (Provincial Beneficence) of Madrid. She was also Deputy Secretary of Protección Escolar (School Protection). She obtained a degree in Medicine from the Complutense University of Madrid in 1918 and a PhD in 1919 with a thesis on ocular tumors.

== Work as a doctor ==
Elisa Soriano started a double professional career, combining ophthalmology in various public institutions and in a private consultation, with the teaching of Hygiene, Physiology and Anatomy at the Escuela Normal Central de Maestras. After finishing her studies, Dr. Soriano participated in several conferences related to Medicine. One of her most important contributions was as a member of the Segundo Congreso Internacional de Ciencias Administrativas, where she presented together with the writer Blanca de los Ríos de Lampérez and the poet Sofía Casanova "La Cruz Roja Internacional en paz y en guerra". In 1921 Dr. Fisher became the first Spanish woman to hold an official position at the Hospital. For this reason, various tributes were held, including those by the ANME and the JUF which were held in the halls of the Palace Hotel and attended by some Spanish feminists such as María Espinosa and Dolores Velasco among others. Even in Redención, one of the first Spanish feminist publications, they picked up the story, by saying that she had the honour of being the first woman to hold an official position at the Hospital. Moreover, this publication said that the JUF could feel proud of having such a president.

Medicine was her vocation, with it she intended to help other people and be independent. However, Soriano's main objective was to draw the attention of her fellow men. In addition, the director of the publication El Monitor Sanitario, Luis Ortega Morejón, wrote a biography about her, in which he asserted that Elisa was the one who had provided hin with the data and that she was the first woman to appear in his journal thanks to: “her capacity, preparation, intelligence and energy to always succeed in difficult missions”. Besides, he also talked about the very important achievements for which she had been honored with the position of professor in the Hospital Clínico de la Facultad de Medicina from which she resigned, according to Luis Ortega Morejón, due to the male chauvinism of the time.

In 1927 Elisa Soriano, who was already part of the Asociación Internacional de Médicas (female doctors association), was named by the famous doctor and feminist Kate Campbell Hurd-Mead president of the Medical Women International Association (MWIA), in an article she wrote after a visit to Spain. In addition, Soriano approved the public examinations and obtained a place in the medical corps of the Spanish Marina Civil, becoming the first woman who landed to carry out this profession. There she worked for a whole year as a medical officer in two lines of passengers that covered the route to South America. After the Spanish Civil War, Elisa Soriano continued to work as a professor and ophthalmologist pediatrician. She promoted actively literary and cultural meetings. In 1962, two years before her death, she received the Medal of the City of Madrid.

== Feminism ==
Elisa Soriano fought all her life for the liberation, modernity emancipation and freedom of women. Dr. Soriano believed in women with self-capacity and autonomy, all of which was mainly provided by education. She supported women to make them realize that they were not the weak sex, and that they did not depend on a patriarchal system. The end of World War I meant the beginning of the struggle for women's rights. At the end of 1918, the National Association of Spanish Women (ANME) was created and Elisa was one of its members. Some of the organization's most desired objectives were: to obtain the right and access to education, to work with equal pay, i.e. the same salary for the same work regardless of who has done it, to defend feminine rights, the protection to all feminine initiativex and humanitarian ideax.

The first piece of information that was published in “El Globo” press on December 8, under the title “The Force that is born” was a manifesto that ends with these words: “Woman’s redemption, perfection of societies, elevation of humanity”. Other ANME activists were Benita Asas, Dolores Velasco and Julia Peguero who were led by María Espinosa de los Monteros. The organization's ideology was considered as center feminist. Redención, a monthly feminist magazine, was the first publication to refer to the Female University Youth (JUF). Elisa affirmed the university's authority to support its own specific feminist actions at the university and in conferences. Two years later, specifically at the Great Meeting of the National Association of Spanish Women, Soriano was selected as one of the permanent members of the new board of directors.

Since the 1920s, Elisa was part of many feminist groups, being one of highest responsible for Spanish associationism of that time. She was one of the most outstanding personalities of that time in Madrid, since she had a great influence on many women who took part in several key moments of the Spanish feminism. It is clear that Dr. Soriano was a feminist and a gender equality advocate. In addition to being a member of the ANME, Soriano was the founder of the JUF, whose objective was to be a link between women from different spheres and associations; in the organization, there was room for all kinds of women regardless of their ideology: republican, monarchical and Catholic. For all these reasons, Soriano became a member of the Supreme Feminist Council of Spain in 1919, an organization created as a result of the merging of several suffragist associations in the country: The Women's Progressive Society, the Spanish League for the Afvancement of Women, Concepción Arenal Society (Valencia), the Women's Association of the Future (Barcelona) and the ANME. The JUF's statutes were published in the magazine Redención, and included the main objective of the association: “That women who follow higher education could obtain the same positions as men when they deserve them for their intelligence”.

Her constant struggle for equality led her in June 1920 to be the Spanish delegate for the University Youth of Madrid at the conference that took place in Geneva on the International Alliance for the Suffrage of Women's initiative. That conference was supposed to be a big step towards female suffrage. Her presence there was not strange at all since Dr. Soriano was considered one of the icons of Spanish feminism and was always in places where she believed it was necessary to represent women's aspirations.

A text signed by J.P. (Julia Peguero) refers to the speech that Dr. Soriano, president of the JUF and member of the ANME, pronounced in an event presided by the Faculty of Philosophy and Letter's dean. Elisa declared herself fully prepared to carry out any professional work common to either sex. She mentioned having been represented at the Conference for the Suffrage of Women, celebrated the previous year in Geneva, by Beatriz Galindo, a renowned author; and in that of the University Women of London, whose representative was the director of the Residence of female students, Maria de Maetzu. They emphasized in that speech that the organization's main objective was to protect those women dedicated to university studies, and this was done by granting money to them. The fortunate ones that year were Maria Cejudo Hervás (Faculty of Sciences, Nature section) and Rosi Poy Martí (Faculty of Medicine, Dentistry). At this event, she treated subjects such as the practices of mixing or separating students of both sexes; the need to put aside professional ideals, as well as political and religious passions. She ended appealing to women by saying that every mission must be of peace: “never of antagonisms and resentment”. The last words of her speech were that each institution would do what it is entrusted to cultivate the young. In February 1921, Dr. Fisher conducted a reform-study of the Civil and Criminal Codes in everything related to women and children.

The relevance of the JUF and its president Elisa was remarkable. That is why she had an audience with the king in October 1921. That same month Soriano attended the International Conference of Students (in Montpellier) as an official delegate of the UNEE. When she came back, she went to Barcelona with the president and secretary of the JUF, Maria Bardan. During her stay in the city, she was invited by Acción Feminista to give a speech about the Feminist University Youth.

At the end of that year, Elisa Soriano presented, for the second consecutive year, an award ceremony at the Central University. In this event, Mercedes García López (Natural Sciences) and Juana García Orcoyen (Medicine) received awards. The merits of the association were highlighted, particularly those of María Espinosa de los Monteros, who, guided by the cause of feminism, contributed to the creation of the awards. Soriano also encouraged young people, "hoping that at last the fraternity among all those who consecrate their lives to science will come back again". Doctor Soriano did not host the ceremony until 11 years later where the Dr. Elisa Soriano International Scholarship was awarded. The ceremony t took place in the International Residence of Ladies of Madrid during the Second Republic. A year later, they named another scholarship upon their name.

In 1922, the JUF continued with their projects and works. The first one was a conference by Odón de Buen on "Women in the University". He spoke about women and their capacity to access to the majority of activities of life in a rapid and abrupt way, especially those related to culture. He called the first women who were brave enough to break with traditional prejudices "heroines of their sex." That year Pilar Oñate pronounced a conference on "Feminism in Spanish Literature"; Tomás Montejo on "The woman before the Spanish positive law"; Micaela Díaz Rabaneda, teacher of the Normal School of Teacher, about"The woman in the feminist demands", [...]. Elisa Soriano participated, on behalf of the JUF, in the tribute to María Guerrero and Fernando Díaz de Mendoza. Moreover, she convened the first scientific-literary contest to encourage the study of the work of university women, regardless of the career they were studying. The diplomas were awarded to Catalina Vives (Sciences) and Concepción Peña Pastor (Letters).

Although the activities of the JUF were fading, the popularity of Elisa Soriano was rising to the point that Augusto Martínez Olmedilla dedicated her a publication in the collection La Novela de Hoy in 1922. In its pages we could read: “To Dr. Elisa Soriano, indefatigable champion of nobles and elevated companies". In 1924, a series of interviews with women who had been fighting for female vote it was conducted, and Dr. Soriano was the first woman to be interviewed.

In 1926 the first meeting of Spanish women took place in the Alkázar Theater in Madrid, in which Elisa intervened. A year later, Soriano was appointed delegate by the Ministry of Public Instruction to represent Spain in the Conference of Bologna. That year the JUF, which had been running for 8 years, had a great activity. A scholarship was created for students who were members of the International Federation of Women University. The Commission of the Federation in Spain had Elisa Soriano as its president. However, they have more wars to fight. The JUF became a true school of leaders and collaborators, especially in the professional field, but always with a demanding approach. Nevertheless, in 1928, the paths of the JUF and of Elisa Soriano separated, since Soriano was appointed in the Spanish Civil Navy to work as a doctor. However, in 1928 she founded, togetherwith a group of friends the Association of Spanish Doctors (AME). The AME was connected to the international medical women movement. This movement was created in the United States in 1919 and had spread to the rest of the world. In fact, in 1927 Dr. Soriano met the president of the Medical Women International Association. The AME and the MWIA had the objective of professionally protecting women doctors and improving the health of women and children. The association stopped working after the Spanish civil war and came back in 1965, in the last years of Francoist Spain.

== Influence ==
According to her niece Alicia Margareto Soriano: "Elisa has fought despite of men." In some of the portraits preserved by her nieces, we are able to see Elisa surrounded by remarkable people like Madame Curie, Albert Einstein, María Espinosa de los Monteros, Odón de Buen or Emilia Pardo Bazán. Elisa Soriano also lived surrounded by women whom she admired. We should emphasize her relationship with lawyer Margarita Nelken. This relationship probably began when Fisher offered Nelker her support after reading an article of her against the abandonment of children and the precarious conditions they had suffered.

Two other women who belonged to her circle of friends were Clara Campoamor and Julia Peguero, with whom she remained friends even in Francoist Spain. Campoamor considered Dr. Soriano a referent, despite being three years older than her. Both were part of the Sociedad Española de Abolicionismo (Spanish Society of Abolitionism) and the Partido Radical (Radical Party). In addition, when Clara Campoamor returned to Spain clandestinely, she used to staye at Elisa's house. Peguero also admired the doctor, although she was 11 years older than her, and both had a close relationshipuntil Elisa's death. Before the war, both had worked as appointed counselors for the republican Government in the National Council of Health and Public Assistance. The admiration was mutual, that is why Elisa kept all the books of the deputy and personal photos in her personal library. At present, these books are part of the Library of the Faculty of Education in the Universidad Complutense de Madrid.

== Life’s Work ==
Elisa Soriano wrote many works during her whole life. She wrote, with assiduity, in publications such as La Medicina Social Española (1918–20) and El Siglo Médico. Her work is usually related to education and health, ocular diseases and women's rights. Some of the publications that should be highlighted are:

- “La mujer española ante los acontecimientos actuales” (The Spanish woman and the current events).
- “La casa de los niños” (The Children's House).
- “La higiene y la mujer” (Hygiene and Women).
- “Desde Guadarrama” (From Guadarrama).
- “Las mujeres españolas” (Spanish Women).
- “El tracoma en Vallehermoso” (The trachoma in Vallehermoso).
- “Protección económica a la mujer” (Economical Protection to Women),
- “La higiene y la moda” (Hygiene and Style).
