= Trinidad Arroyo =

Spanish ophthalmologist (1872–1959)

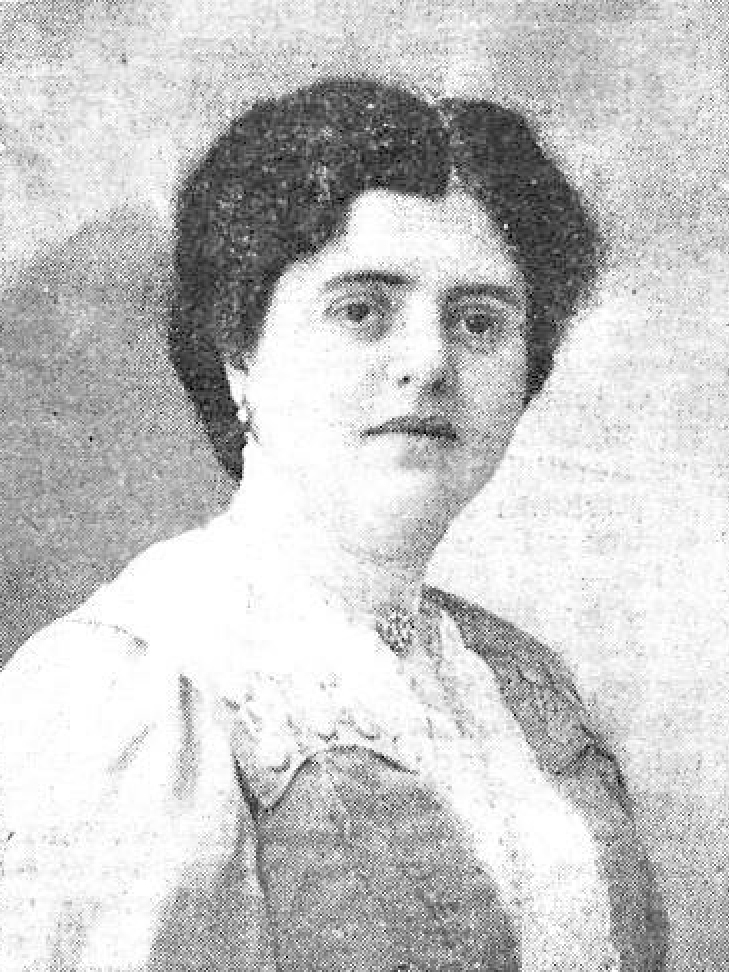
- Arroyo in 1916
- Born: Trinidad Arroyo Villaverde; 26 May 1872; Palencia, Spain
- Died: 28 September 1959 (aged 87); Mexico City, Mexico
- Education: University of Madrid (1896)
- Occupation: Ophthalmologist

Trinidad Arroyo Villaverde (26 May 1872 – 28 September 1959) was a Spanish ophthalmologist. She was the first woman ophthalmologist in Spain and the third to receive a doctorate degree, obtaining her doctorate in 1896. She was a teacher and researcher at the University of Madrid, and she operated an ophthalmology practice with her husband Manuel Márquez. They were forced to flee the country in 1939 due to the Spanish Civil War, and they resumed their practice in Mexico City, where they lived for the rest of their lives.

Arroyo was politically active while living in Spain, serving as vice president of a women's anti-fascist association and participating in several feminist organizations. It was this, as well as her alleged ties with the Soviet Union, that made her and her husband targets of the Nationalist faction in the Spanish Civil War. She was also one of the first women in Spain to vote in an election, a right granted to her by her position in the university faculty.

== Early life and education ==
Trinidad Arroyo was born in Palencia, Spain, on 26 May 1872. Her family was middle class, and her father was the owner of a dry cleaner. From 1883 to 1888, she attended the Instituto Libre de Segunda Enseñanza in Palencia where she was the first woman student. Arroyo then attended the University of Valladolid to obtain a degree in medicine.

Gaining admission to the university was difficult for Arroyo as it had established a rule against women students in 1882. Her father had to complain to the director of public instruction and she was required to take a unique exam to prove her ability. She was given permission to enroll in December 1888 and she was admitted as a student from 1889 to 1895. While at Valladolid, Arroyo became interested in surgery, but she specialized in ophthalmology as she appreciated the delicacy and precision involved, and she determined that it was more open to women. She also expressed interest in pharmacy and law, but she declined the former because she did not wish to take orders from a doctor and she declined the latter out of pragmatism, knowing that a woman's law practice would not succeed.

After graduating from Valladolid, Arroyo attended the University of Madrid for her doctorate while studying under Santiago de los Albitos. She defended her 149 page dissertation, Músculos intrínsecos del ojo en estado normal y patológico, acción de los medicamentos (Intrinsic eye muscles in normal and diseased states, the effects of medication), in 1896. She was only the third woman in Spain to earn a doctorate and the first to be in a subject other than gynaecology, making her the first woman ophthalmologist in Spain. She continued studying ocular muscles after obtaining her doctorate.

== Career and later life ==
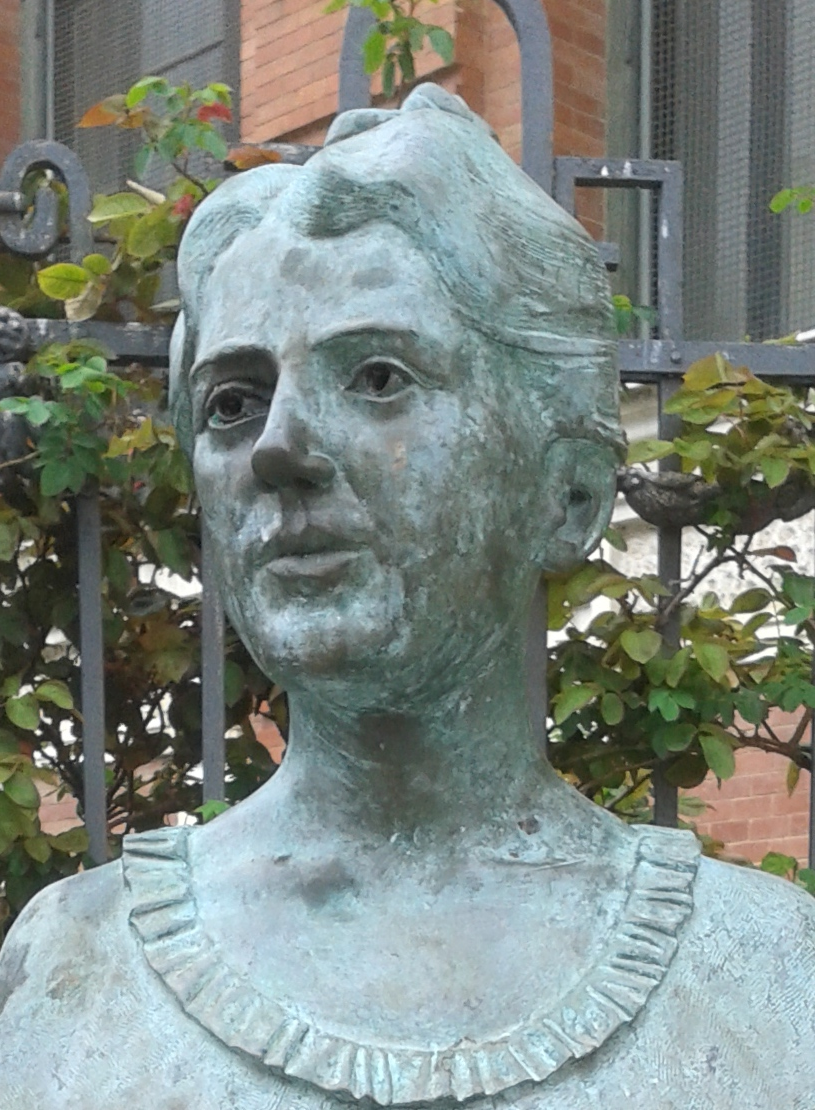
Bust of Arroyo in Palencia, Spain

In 1898, Arroyo opened an ophthalmology practice in Palencia with her brother Benito who had studied ophthalmology with her in Valladolid and Madrid. On 6 February 1902, she married fellow ophthalmologist Manuel Márquez who encouraged her throughout her life to pursue science despite societal opposition to women in science. Her brother Benito, who had introduced Arroyo and Márquez, died shortly afterward in 1903. For two years, beginning in 1906, the couple left Madrid for Galicia while Márquez held a position at the University of Santiago de Compostela.

Arroyo and her husband began an ophthalmology practice in Madrid in their joint home and office with improvements constructed by Arroyo's architect cousin Jerónimo Arroyo. Among those Arroyo treated was novelist Benito Pérez Galdós, and she is credited with saving him from blindness. Beyond their private practice, Arroyo was involved with the Consultorio de Niños Pecho, the Instituto Rubio, and the Asilo de Santa Lucía. In addition to Spanish, Arroyo was able to speak English, French, and German, which was of great use to the associations that she was involved with, as she was able to represent them to other countries.

Arroyo and her husband were also instructors at the University of Madrid. She was the first woman to teach at the University of Madrid, where she worked as an assistant professor. She produced extensive research in the field of ophthalmology, on subjects that included "the use of atropine in corneal ulcers, ocular analgesia of codeine hydrochloride, adrenaline in ophthalmology, retinal detachment, astigmatism and diagnosis and therapy of ocular tuberculosis". Despite her extensive work and involvement with the university, she was not granted the same privileges or status as her colleagues. She was never granted a professorial position nor was she allowed to publish with the university.

In the opening days of the Spanish Civil War, Arroyo assisted in treating the wounded. Arroyo and her husband traveled to the Soviet Union in 1937. This trip and their loyalty to the Republican faction and their familiarity with several communist intellectuals in Spain led to them being targeted by the Nationalist faction in 1939. Arroyo and her husband fled to Mexico and they settled in Mexico City.

The Mexican government welcomed Spanish exiles through the Casa de España sponsorship program, and they quickly integrated themselves within the community of Spanish intellectuals in exile, along with figures such as Ignacio Bolívar, José Gaos León Felipe, and Max Aub. They also continued their practice as ophthalmologists in Mexico. Arroyo officially became a Mexican citizen on 29 October 1940, one of the few Spanish exiles to do so. She returned to Spain only once, visiting in 1955 to establish scholarships; she and her husband had decided to leave their estate to students of Spain, as they had no children of their own. She chose the Instituto Libre de Segunda Enseñanza as the recipient of her donation as it was the school that allowed her to begin her studies. Arroyo died in Mexico City on 28 September 1959. Her husband died three years later, and they were buried beside one another in Mexico City.

== Politics ==
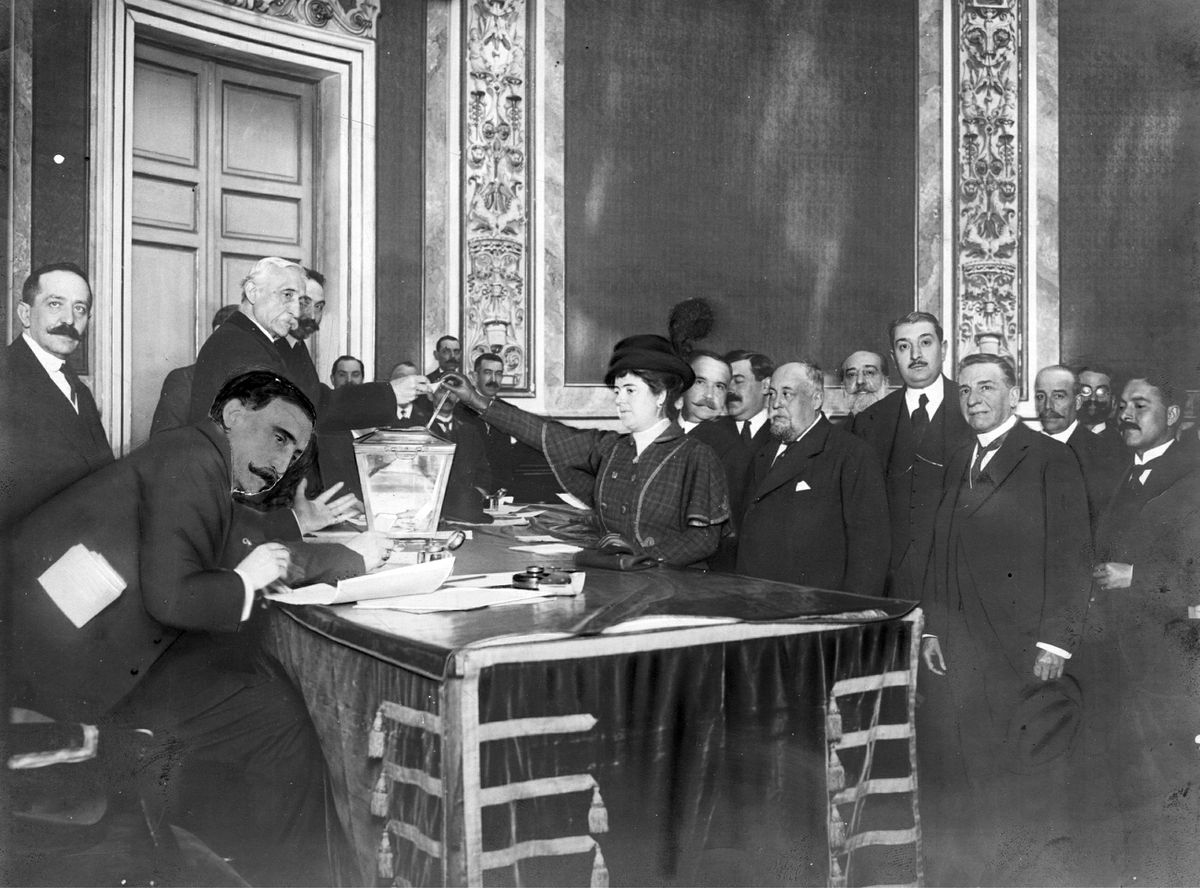
Arroyo voting in 1916

Arroyo was the vice president of the National Committee of Anti-fascist Women, and she worked to strengthen ties between the Soviet Union and Spain through the creation of a social exchange program on 30 January 1937. Arroyo's cousin twice removed, Cristina Márquez Arroyo, has alternatively described Arroyo as liberal and communist. She opposed charity, instead favoring education and work. She was an especially strong advocate of women's education, having benefited from it herself. Arroyo became active in feminist organizations during the Spanish Civil War, such as Lyceum Club Femenino, Comité Femenino de Higiene Popular, and the Spanish Association of Women Physicians, and she wrote a feminist column in the journal Spanish Social Medicine.

Arroyo was possibly the first woman to vote in a Spanish Senate election, as she was allowed a vote as a member of the university faculty. She cast her vote in 1916, 17 years before women's suffrage was achieved in Spain. It is unknown whether any woman in Spain had cast a vote before this day.
