= Spanish Association of University Women =

Association of Spanish women (1920–1989)

The Spanish Association of University Women (Asociación Española de Mujeres Universitarias - AEMU) was an entirely female association that was founded in 1920, although at first it was called the Female University Youth (JUF), and Elisa Soriano Fischer was president of the first Board. Since its refoundation in 2007, its name has been the Spanish Federation of University Women (FEMU).

== History ==
In 1920, there were approximately 345 women enrolled at the university in Spain. Of these students, 30%, around 100, were members of this association.

The initial association, the JUF, quickly integrated into the International Federation of University Women (FIMU), which was based in London. For this reason, María de Maeztu attended the First International Conference held in the aforementioned city and presented a report entitled "Higher Education for Women."

Although times seemed more favorable for the incorporation of women into university studies, in 1922, when the Second International Conference was held in Paris, María's report did not present improvements, but rather highlighted a worsening of the situation.

In 1928, the XII Conference took place and was organized in Spain, which at that time already had With nearly 1,700 women enrolled at the university.

The association's objectives were to defend women's rights to access university studies and to seek a change in the law that would prevent the existing discrimination that prevented women from entering higher education on equal terms with men.

Between 1929 and 1936, the JUF gradually became more involved in issues that went beyond the struggle for equality in the field of education and encompassed more political and social issues facing women. This change in attitude and objectives may be related, on the one hand, to the current situation in Spain and, on the other, to the change of president, Clara Campoamor at the time.

The outbreak of the Civil War brought the initial associative project to a complete halt, and although an attempt was made to restart the movement in 1953, under the new name of the Spanish Association of University Women (AEMU), great care had to be taken to avoid clashes with the new state in power.

The Board of Directors of this new association was made up of, among others, María Teresa Bermejo (the first president of this new era) and Justina Ruiz Malaxechevarría, who contacted American women and Spanish exiles. Thus, two years later, in 1955, the association had more than one hundred members, among which stand out: Isabel García Lorca, Pilar Lago de Lapesa, Jimena Menéndez Pidal, Dolores Franco, María Teresa Bermejo, Elena Gómez and Soledad Ortega.

The association's objectives remained the defense of women's right to equal access to university studies and their subsequent development as students; at the same time, it sought to create an atmosphere of "understanding and sisterhood" with women from other countries, while also continuing to defend a more liberal mentality, in keeping with the association's beginnings.

Between 1970 and 1973, many changes and tense situations occurred, partly due to an identity crisis within the association, as it found itself heavily influenced by feminist and leftist currents of thought that were beginning to gain traction in Spanish society at the time. The presidency of the association fell to Natacha Seseña, who believed it was time to open the association to young university women. When the presidency fell to Jimena Alonso (between 1973 and 1976), a true generational change occurred, and the feminist dimension became fully entrenched in the association.

The arrival of democracy in Spain and all the changes that society underwent throughout the 1980s marked a period of decline for the association, which was unable to channel its objectives into this new society. This was compounded by a difficult economic situation, which led to the disappearance of the association in 1989, with Helena Araluce as its last president.

The federation experienced a new resurgence in 2007 when a group of members from Álava, Bilbao, and Madrid met in Lerma (Burgos) to recapture the spirit of the founders and create what is now known as the Spanish Federation of University Women (FEMU).

In 2023, the Associations that constitute it are: AMUB (Association of University Women of Bizkaia), AMUM (Association of University Women of Marbella), and AMUMU (Association of University Women of Murcia).

Their objectives have been consolidated over the years, responding to the cultural needs of the federation and, above all, to the growing interest in providing education to as many women as possible. With this approach, the FEMU plans to fulfill one of its most commitments: equal opportunities through education.

The Spanish-Speaking Cultural Bridge is an initiative originally promoted by the FEMU under the GWI twinning program (NFA-to-NFA Membership Marketplace). The Federations of University Women of Argentina (FAMU), Bolivia (FBMPU), Spain (FEMU), Mexico (FEMU), Panama (AMUP), and Paraguay (PFGW) currently belong to it, constituting a cultural and twinning forum between these countries that share a language, history, and interests.
