= Jusep Torres Campalans =

Novel about a fictitious painter written by Max Aub in 1958

First edition

Jusep Torres Campalans is a novel by Spanish writer Max Aub, published in 1958. It is presented as the biography of a fictitious Catalan painter Jusep Campalans.

According to the novel, during a stay in Paris, Campalans became one of the founders of the Cubist movement. During World War II, he is said to have moved to Mexico, where he spent the rest of his life as a recluse in Chiapas. The book even included a catalogue of Campalans' works (written by "H. R. Town") for an abortive exhibition at the Tate Gallery in 1942, with illustrations and photos.

Parallels with Aub's life have been noted. The novel is still often listed as a factual biography.
