= Max Aub =

Mexican-Spanish novelist

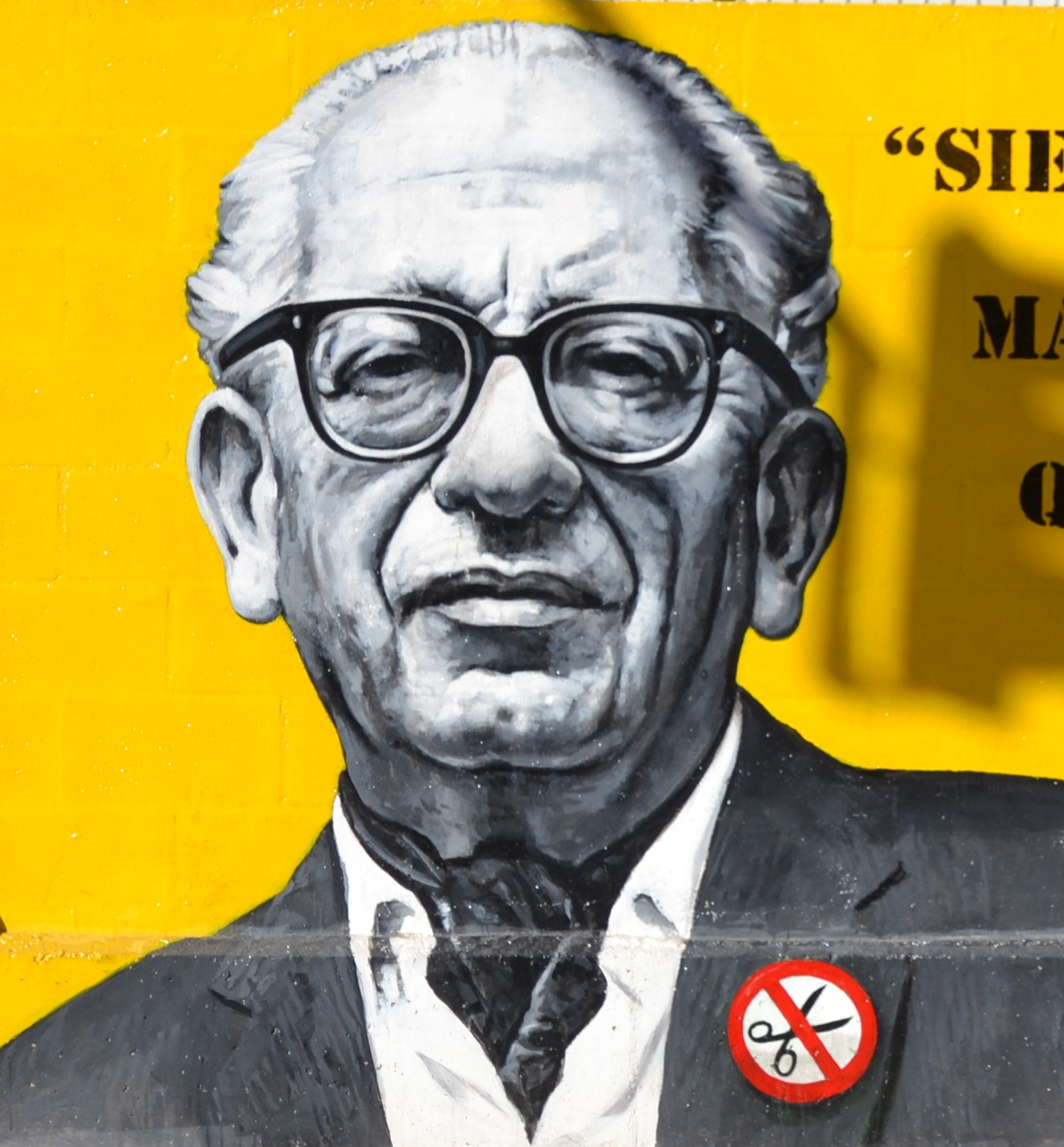
Max Aub. Detail from a mural in Valencia

Max Aub Mohrenwitz (June 2, 1903, Paris – July 22, 1972 Mexico City) was a Mexican-Spanish experimentalist novelist, playwright, poet, and literary critic. In 1965 he founded the literary periodical Los Sesenta (the Sixties), with editors that included the poets Jorge Guillén and Rafael Alberti.

== Early life ==
Aub was born in Paris to a French-Jewish mother and German father, who was a travelling salesman. At the outbreak of World War I, his father was in Spain on business and could not return to France, as he had become an enemy alien. Max and his mother joined him there and they all took Spanish citizenship. In 1914 Aub and his family settled in Valencia. There he completed his secondary education. In 1920, Aub became a salesman, like his father and from 1920 to 1935 he traveled through Spain and other European countries selling a variety of different products. In 1921, he became a Spanish citizen. His work, Geografía, was first published in Revista de Occidente in 1927. In 1929, Aub joined the Spanish Socialist Workers' Party and remained a lifelong member.

== Spanish Civil War ==
During the Spanish Civil War, the Republican government posted him to Paris as a cultural attaché. In 1937, he was responsible for placing Picasso's "Guernica" on display at the International Exposition, and took part in the organisation of the Second Congress of Anti-Fascists Writers. After that, Aub returned to Spain and in August 1937 he was nominated general secretary of the Consejo Central de Teatro. In 1938 he worked in André Malraux's film L'espoir and wrote its screenplay.

== Exile ==
In February 1939 Aub left Spain with André Malraux and the film crew of L'espoir. By 1940, the Spanish State had come to consider him a serious opponent, and in March 1940 he was denounced to the new Vichy government of France as a militant communist and a "German-Jew", and therefore a possible spy or traitor. He was imprisoned for a year in Camp Vernet, then deported to the forced labor camp of Djelfa in Algeria. In 1942, with the help of a guard, he escaped. His escape was facilitated by Don Gilberto Bosques, the Mexican Consul-General in France.

Soon thereafter, he was able to find passage from Casablanca to Mexico, followed shortly by his wife and children. Once he was settled in, he joined other Spanish exiles — including Luis Buñuel, with whom he formed a working friendship. In Mexico he worked as screenwriter. He also wrote for the newspapers Nacional and Excélsior and worked as a professor at the Film Academy in Mexico. He became a Mexican citizen in 1955 and lived in Mexico City until his death. In 1972, he was elected Chevalier de l'Ordre des Arts et Lettres by the French Government.

== Work ==
Although Aub was the author of nearly 100 novels and plays and is very well known in Spain, only two works are available in English:

- Jusep Torres Campalans. Translated by Herbert Weinstock, Doubleday, 1962.
- Field of Honour. Translated by Gerald Martin, Verso Press, 2009. ISBN 1-84467-400-2

The centerpiece of his work is the impressive cycle of novels El laberinto mágico (The Magic Labyrinth) about the Spanish Civil War, written between 1943 and 1968: Campo Cerrado, translated into English as Field of Honour (1943), Campo abierto (1951), Campo de Sangre (1945), Campo del Moro (1963), Campo de los Almendros (1965) and Campo Frances (1968). The cycle also comprises another 25 short stories.
