= Benita Asas Manterola =

Spanish teacher, journalist, and suffragist

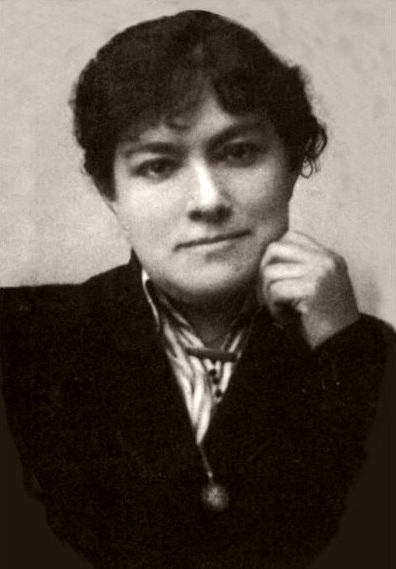
- Born: 4 March 1873; San Sebastian, Spain
- Died: 21 April 1968 (aged 95); Bilbao, Spain
- Occupations: Activist, journalist, teacher

Benita Asas Manterola (4 March 1873 – 21 April 1968) was a Spanish teacher, journalist, and suffragist. She was a key figure in the early feminist movement in Spain, advocating for women's rights and suffrage during the early 20th century.

== Early life ==
Benita Asas Manterola was born in San Sebastián. She trained as a teacher and worked in the Madrid public school system.

== Activism and feminism ==
Asas Manterola co-founded El Pensamiento Femenino (The Feminine Thought) alongside Pilar Fernández Selfa, which ran from 1913 to 1917. This bi-monthly periodical became an important platform for advocating women’s rights and discussing feminist issues. The publication ran until 1917 and is remembered as one of the pioneering feminist journals in Spain.

In addition to her work with El Pensamiento Femenino (The Feminine Thought), Asas Manterola became president of the Asociación Nacional de Mujeres Españolas (ANME, National Association of Spanish Women) in 1924, a position she held until 1932. ANME was one of the most influential feminist organizations in Spain at the time, actively campaigning for women's suffrage and equality. Under her leadership, ANME launched Mundo Femenino (Feminine World), a monthly newspaper that she directed starting in 1925.

In 1929, Asas Manterola represented ANME at the international congress of the Women’s International League for Peace and Freedom, an organization dedicated to promoting peace and women’s rights worldwide. Her participation highlighted her commitment to connecting Spanish feminism with broader global movements. Asas was also a founding member of the Lyceum Club Femenino of Madrid, created by Maria de Maeztu Whitney. Asas died in Bilbao in 1968.

== Legacy ==
In 2017, a street in the city of Bilbao was renamed in recognition of Asas' contribution to the defense of women's rights. In her hometown of San Sebastián, a square in the Egia neighborhood bears her name, commemorating her work. During the 1990s, the city of Guadalajara dedicated a street to her in a new neighborhood that exclusively honors Spanish women.

In 2022, the University of Deusto established the Benita Asas Manterola Awards, recognizing research with a feminist perspective.
