= Revista de Occidente =

Monthly cultural magazine in Spain

- Categories: Cultural magazine
- Frequency: Monthly
- Publisher: Jose Ortega y Gasset Foundation
- Founder: Jose Ortega y Gasset
- Founded: 1923
- Country: Spain
- Based in: Madrid
- Language: Spanish
- Website: Revista de Occidente
- ISSN: 0034-8635
- OCLC: 6407611

Revista de Occidente (Spanish: Magazine of the West) is a cultural magazine which has been in circulation since 1923 with some interruptions. It is based in Madrid, Spain, and is known for its founder, José Ortega y Gasset, a Spanish philosopher.

== History and profile ==
Revista de Occidente was established by José Ortega y Gasset in 1923. Initially its publisher was a company with the same name which was also founded by Gasset. The magazine is published by the Madrid-based Jose Ortega y Gasset Foundation on a monthly basis.

From 1923 to 1936 the editor of Revista de Occidente was José Martínez Ruiz. During this period the major contributors were Rosa Chacel, Ramiro Ledesma and Federico García Lorca. Spanish novelist Benjamín Jarnés also published articles in the magazine. One of the frequent topics which the magazine covered in its early period was the idea of Europe, and it became a transnational platform where this idea was discussed.

Through Revista de Occidente José Ortega y Gasset laid the foundations of his approach on modernism. Revista de Occidente was instrumental in making his modernist approach well-known across the world. The magazine also featured articles on the acceptance of modernism in Spain.

Revista de Occidente provided a platform for the young avant-garde artists and writers belonging to the Generation of '27, including Maruja Mallo. Federico García Lorca first published some of his poems in Revista de Occidente. Victoria Ocampo published the first article in Spanish on Virginia Woolf and her book entitled A Room of One’s Own in the magazine in 1934. Max Aub's novel Geografía was first serialized in the magazine in 1927.

Revista de Occidente did not only published literary work, but also covered articles about many distinct disciplines, including paleontology. It played a significant role in introducing the views of the German philosopher Oswald Spengler in Spain from 1924. In the early 1930s it adopted a liberal political stance.

Revista de Occidente ceased publication in 1936 when the civil war began and also, its contributor Federico García Lorca died. After a long hiatus the magazine was restarted in 1963. It was not published in the period 1977–1980. It was relaunched by Soledad Ortega Spottorno, daughter of José Ortega y Gasset, in 1980. It mostly features articles on humanities and social sciences as well as interviews.
