= Soledad Ortega Spottorno =

Soledad Ortega Spottorno (Madrid, March 2, 1914 - ibid., November 19, 2007) was a Spanish intellectual. The daughter of the philosopher José Ortega y Gasset and Rosa Spottorno Topete, she was the driving force behind a large number of cultural projects, including the creation of the José Ortega y Gasset Foundation.

== Biography ==
She graduated in Philosophy and Literature from the University of Madrid in 1936, majoring in Medieval History. With the outbreak of the Spanish Civil War, she moved to Paris, making subsequent trips over the next two years to Holland and England, where she taught Hispanic Literature. Between 1939 and 1940, she lived in Buenos Aires before returning to Madrid. There, she founded the Aula Nueva Academy for Pre-University Studies, teaching Geography and History until 1942. She taught there until 1956. From then until 1977, she worked at the publishing house of the Revista de Occidente, founded by her father. During those years, she also dedicated herself to organizing the José Ortega y Gasset archive and actively chaired the Spanish Association of University Women.

In 1978, she founded the José Ortega y Gasset Foundation, organizing a branch of it in Argentina in 1988 and serving as its president until 1993. She directed the Revista de Occidente since its reappearance in 1980 and chaired the Ortega y Gasset University Research Institute since 1987, located in the same Residencia de Señoritas (Students' Residence) she visited during her studies.
