= Spanish Republican exiles =

Spanish citizens in exile due to persecution by the Francoist dictatorship

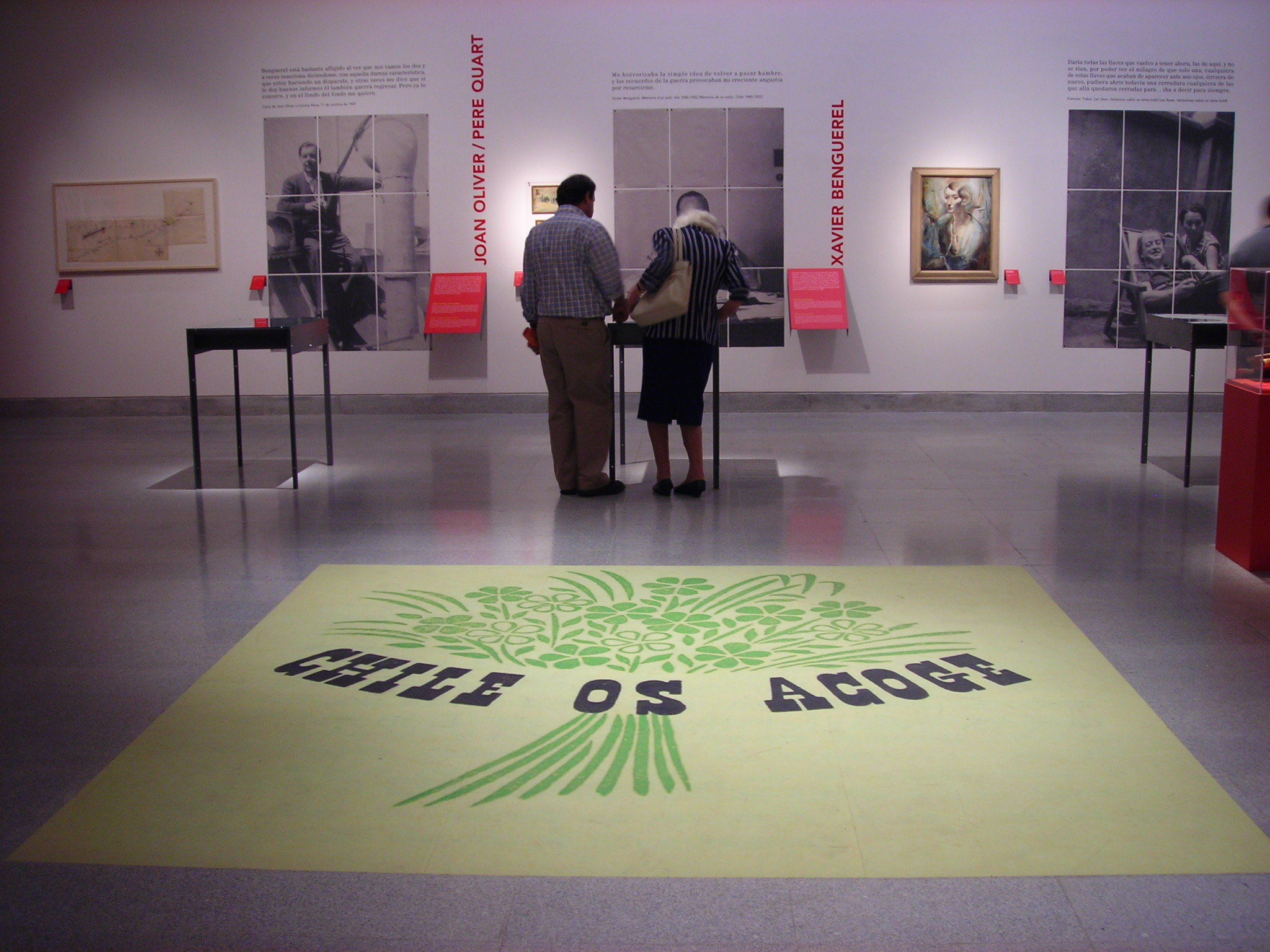
- Exhibition Literaturas del Exilio, (Note: English: Literatures of Exile) designed by architectural firm Mizien Arquitectura at the Palacio de La Moneda Cultural Center, Santiago, Chile (June–July 2007). When the civil war ended, thousands of Spaniards—who were being persecuted by the Francoist dictatorship—arrived in Chile. Many of them did so on board the SS Winnipeg, which landed in Valparaíso in 1939.
- Date: 1939–1975
- Location: Spain
- Type: Exile
- Cause: Persecution and repression by the dictatorship of Francisco Franco

Flag of Spain between 1931 and 1939

The phrase Spanish Republican exiles refers to all the citizens of the Second Spanish Republic who, during the Spanish Civil War from 1936 to 1939 and the immediate post-war period, were forced to leave their homeland and move to other countries. This was either for political and ideological reasons or for fear of retaliation by the winning side and the authoritarian political regime established in Spain. Thus, they remained abroad until circumstances had changed in the country, which allowed them to return gradually. However, many became integrated into the societies that had given them refuge and thus they contributed to their development in some cases.

A large proportion of the first wave of refugees—up to 440,000 in France according to an official report dated March 1939—initially faced harsh living conditions, which worsened because of the outbreak of World War II. Although many of them managed to return in the 1940s, the "permanent" Republican exile consisted of around 220,000 people, many of whom were former combatants, politicians, or civil servants directly committed to the Republican cause. Also among them were thousands of relatives and civilians, along with a significant number of children, intellectuals, artists, scientists, teachers, and skilled professionals, which was a further determining factor in the process of rebuilding the country as a consequence of the conflict.

The main destination countries were, in particular, France, Mexico, Argentina, and the Soviet Union, but large groups were also granted asylum in other countries such as Uruguay, Chile, Colombia, Venezuela, Cuba, Peru, the Dominican Republic, the United States, and the United Kingdom.

Over the years, the internal political evolution in Spain and the gradual process of reconciliation, which culminated in the period of the Spanish Transition and the establishment of democracy, slowly allowed for the return of the exiles. However, there were also many who, due to their degree of integration, decided to remain in the countries that had granted them asylum and where they later met other Spaniards who had arrived either as emigrants for economic reasons since the 1950s or who were part of a new wave of exiles: those persecuted by the dictatorship until 1975.

== Population displacements during the war ==
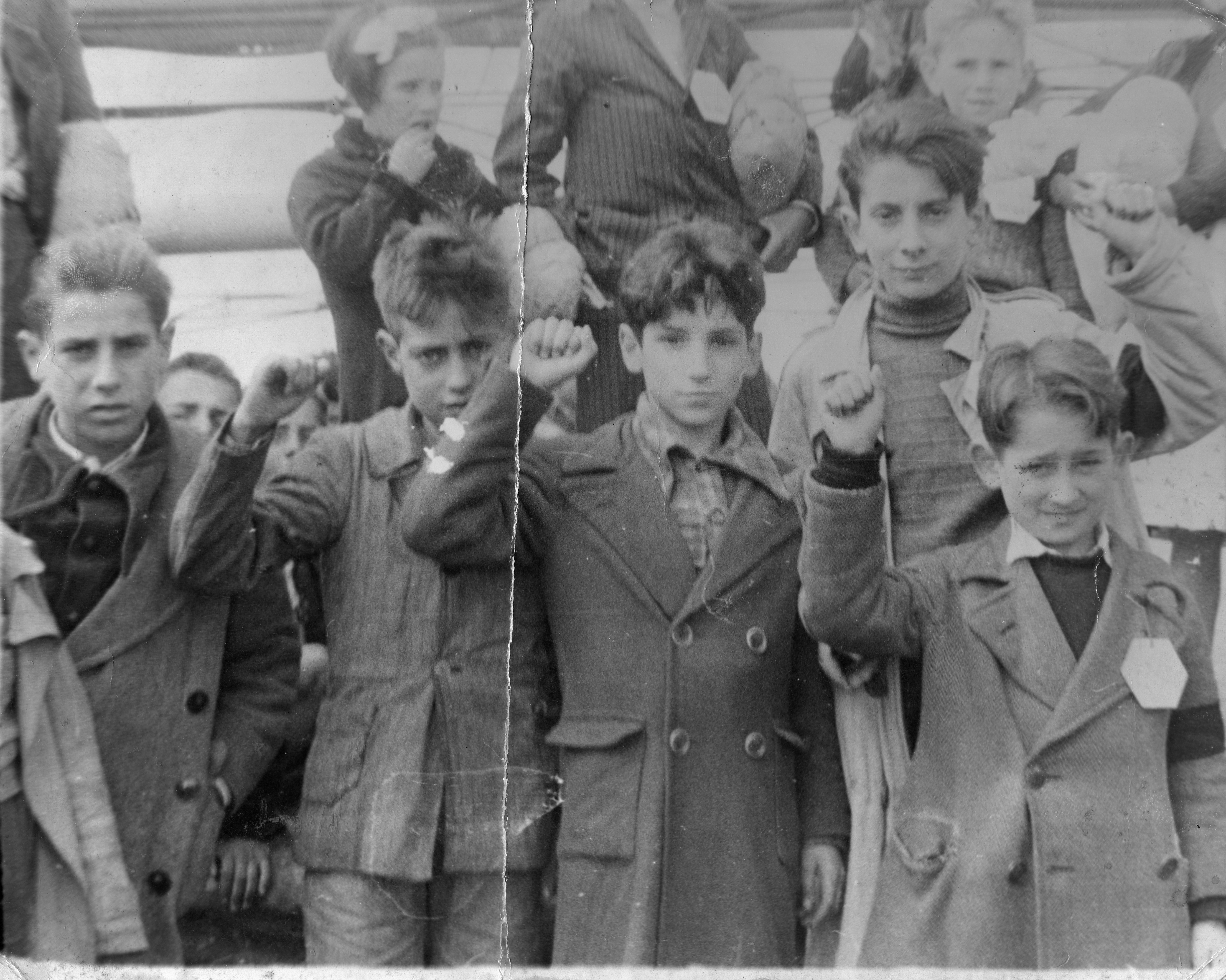
Children waiting to be evacuated from Spain, with their fists raised, a symbol used by the left.

The first displacements of refugees and exiles took place during the first months of the war—especially in the period from August to December 1936—marked by episodes of systematic violence against the civilian population, both because of ideologically motivated repression by the rebel forces and by the supporters of the social revolution, as well as the advance of military operations. These displacements were mainly to France and were characterized by their still provisional nature. Thus the groups were made up of people from the border regions of Aragon, Catalonia, and the Basque Country, either because of their proximity to the rebel faction, in the case of the first two, or because they were supporters of the government who were fleeing the advance of the Irún front, in the latter case, or they were simply "neutral" people who felt threatened by the climate of hostility and violence.

As the conflict developed, the provisional nature became more permanent in the case of those displaced persons who were close to the Republican faction, to the point that, although there were still people fleeing en masse, actions were being taken by the Republican government to put some order into the evacuations, especially those involving minors. The Central Office for Evacuation and Refugee Assistance was set up in October 1936, on the eve of the siege of Madrid, in anticipation of mass evacuations to the Mediterranean coast, while France's General Confederation of Labour created the Comité d'accueil aux enfants d'Espagne in Paris in November.

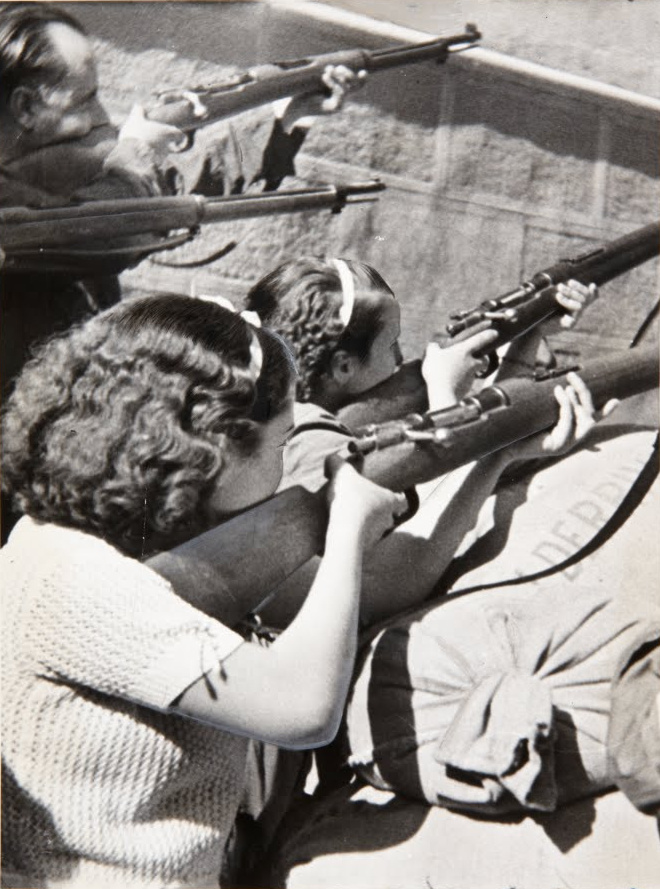
Republican militiawomen in the Siege of the Alcázar in Toledo during the Civil War.

The first evacuations of children took place from Madrid and Valencia, when 100 minors were sent to the USSR in February 1937, and from the Basque Country, where 450 people were evacuated to the French island of Oléron, at the La Maison Heureuse vacation colony. Pirmin Treku, who arrived in Britain among the Basque child evacuees, later became a principal dancer with the Royal Ballet. Later, around 300 of them were taken to Paris while the rest were granted asylum in Oostduinkerke, Belgium. A total of 456 minors arrived in Mexico in June 1937. From that moment on, they would be known by the collective name Children of Morelia. (Note: Also known as Los Niños de la Guerra or the Children of War.) The arrangements for their transfer were made possible thanks to the Committee for the Assistance to Spanish Children.

According to Bartolomé Bennassar (2004), around 10,000 Basque citizens fled by road to France. Many refugees left Catalonia by sea, headed to Marseille and Genoa, and on foot through the Pyrenees, trying to avoid being seen by militiamen and border guards. Overall, it is estimated that between 30,000 and 35,000 refugees from Catalonia arrived in France and Italy between July 1936 and late 1938.

The military operations carried out on the Northern front, which saw Francoist units advance from Biscay towards Santander in the spring of 1937, brought about a new wave of thousands of exiles, a significant number of whom were children, this time exclusively republicans, to Bordeaux, La Rochelle, and Lorient. Following the indiscriminate bombing of Guernica, the United Kingdom reluctantly agreed to take in Republican children. Thus, on 21 May 1937, nearly 4,000 Basque children left Santurtzi on board the steamship Habana (which had capacity for 400 passengers), bound for the English port of Southampton. Months later, Arthur Hinsley, cardinal and archbishop-prelate of Westminster, demonstrated the pro-Franco attitude of the English Catholic hierarchy when he publicly supported the deportation of Basque refugee children back to Spain. In 1938, after the battle of Bielsa pocket and the withdrawal of the 43rd Division of the People's Army, there was a new displacement of people in Aragon, who took refuge directly on the other side of the border. In late 1938, it is estimated that 40,000 emigrants remained on French soil, although they were considered to be in a situation of temporary displacement.

The biggest wave took place after the fall of Barcelona (February 1939). At that time, more than half a million people fled to France. Especially in the early stages, a large number of them were interned in camps set up by the French government under Daladier. Conditions in such camps were appalling, such as in the case of the Gurs internment camp. In those first few months, about half of those who had initially taken refuge in France returned to Spain (now entirely under the control of the Francoists).

A few weeks before the end of the war, the Valière report, carried out at the request of the French government, estimated that by 9 March 1939 there were about 440,000 refugees in France, of whom 170,000 were women, children, and elderly persons, 220,000 soldiers and militiamen, 40,000 invalids, and 10,000 wounded.

== The 1939 Republican exodus to France ==
=== La Retirada (January–February 1939) ===
Emigration to France sped up significantly during the course of the Battle of the Ebro and the following months. The exodus of citizens from Catalonia was massive after the fall of Barcelona on 26 January 1939. The government of Édouard Daladier decided to open the France–Spain border on 27 January. Refugees fled across the Pyrenees via La Jonquera, Portbou, Le Perthus, Cerbère, and Bourg-Madame. According to an official report dated March 1939, the number of Spanish refugees in France was estimated at 440,000. Moreover, historians have estimated the number of exiles after the fall of Catalonia at 465,000, of whom 170,000 were civilians.

=== Reception of refugees ===
The southwestern French departments, close to Spain, were the ones that received the largest number of refugees, with heavy Spanish immigration in the cities of Bordeaux and Toulouse, where there were Spaniards already living. Other departments in the Atlantic coast region, especially Loire-Atlantique, also received refugees, as well as the Massif Central region, Bouches-du-Rhône, and Paris.

The exiles were received differently from one place to another. Some were welcomed and shown solidarity, while others were viewed with distrust and even hostility with hints of xenophobia.

=== French concentration camps ===
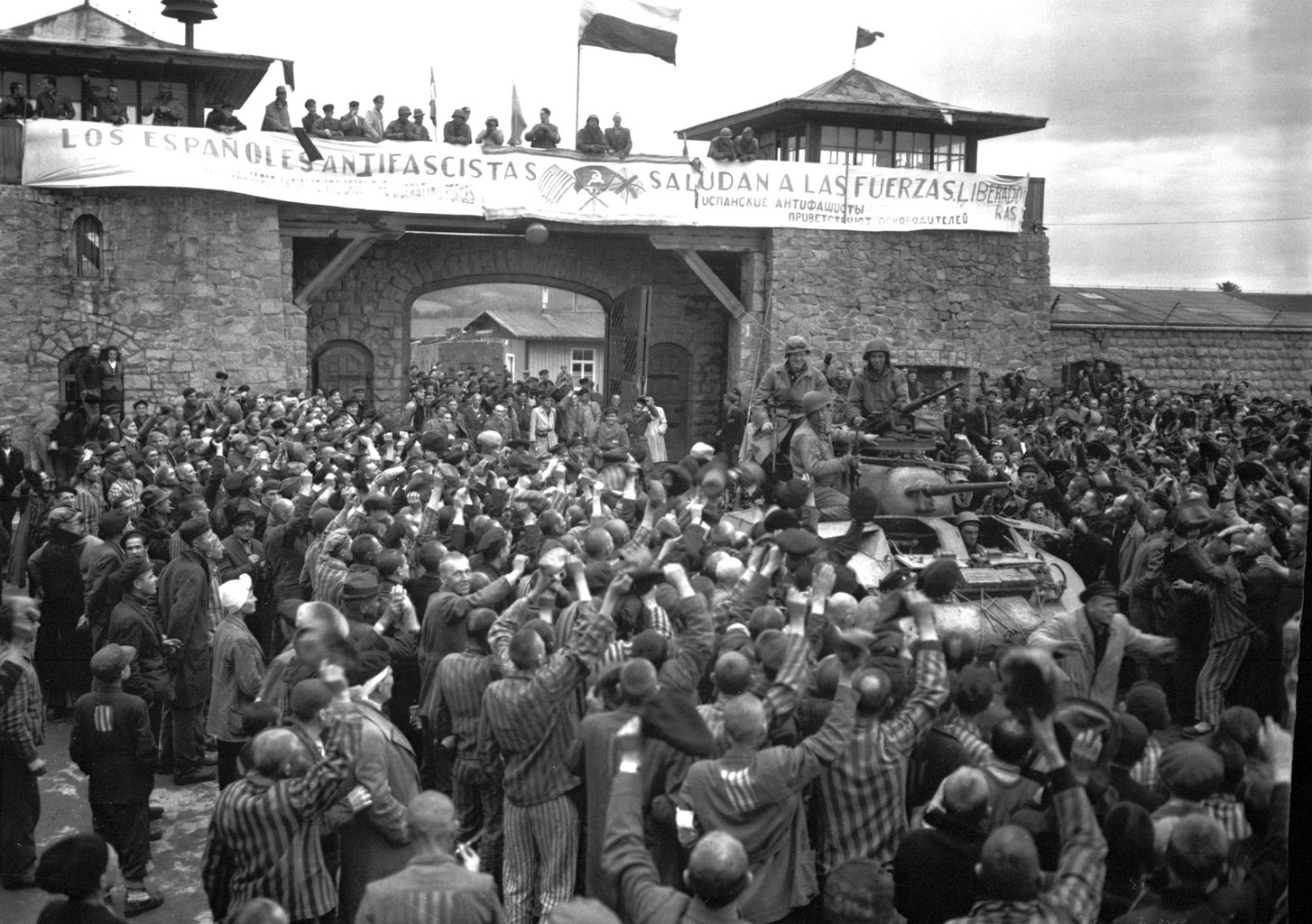
Liberation by the United States of the Mauthausen concentration camp under a banner written in Spanish that reads: Los españoles antifascistas saludan a las fuerzas liberadoras. (Note: English: Antifascist Spaniards greet the liberating forces.) Almost 9,000 Republican Spaniards ended up in Nazi concentration camps.

== Main internment camps ==
These camps evolved over time. French authorities were overwhelmed by the mascaret humain (Note: English: Human tide)—in the words of Interior Minister Albert Sarraut—of La Retirada and thus regrouped the refugees in "control" or "sorting" camps at the border. Later, they placed them in concentration camps (the official term at the time, later renamed "internment" camps) located at the foothills of the Pyrenees and, especially, on the Mediterranean beaches closest to the border. Around 270,000 men, most of them former combatants of the Republican Army, would be interned there. These consisted of a sandy area enclosed by barbed-wire fences, without even a roof to take shelter under, and surrounded by Senegalese soldiers armed with machine guns and rifles. At the beginning, they were located in the Pyrénées-Orientales department, as in the case of the Saint-Cyprien interment camp, the Argelers concentration camp, or the Le Barcarès interment camp on the beaches. These specialized internment camps—which mainly held Basques, former members of the International Brigades (the Gurs camp), Catalonians (Agde, Camp de Rivesaltes), elderly people (Bram), and the Durruti Division (Camp Vernet)—were created in February 1939 in the neighboring departments of Roussillon province, to make up for the growth of the coastal structures and the deteriorated health conditions.

When mentioning the numbers of Spanish exiles, records often overlook those who disembarked in North Africa, who totaled around 10,000. Historian Anne Charaudeau (1992) explains in detail how these exiles were treated after their arrival. At first held in the various camps because of the potential danger they represented, they quickly became an essential labor force in wartime. In French Algeria, exiles who were recaptured were employed in the quarries for the construction of the Trans-Saharan Railway starting in 1939. According to historian Peter Gaida (2014), the living conditions of forced laborers in the railway works after 1940 were as follows:

Dans les camps du «Transsaharien», les travailleurs forcés sont exposés à un régime brutal, et de nombreux travailleurs succombent à la faim, aux maladies et à la torture, pour être libérés en mai 1943, après le débarquement des Alliés en Afrique du Nord. (Note: English: In the camps of the Trans-Saharan [Railway], forced laborers are exposed to a brutal regime, and many succumb to hunger, disease, and torture, only to be liberated in May 1943 after the Allies landed in North Africa.)

Ideological clashes arising from the Spanish Civil War were reproduced in the camps among the prisoners and exploited by the French authorities. For instance, authorities took advantage of tensions between anarchists and communists to control the latter, as in the case of Camp Vernet, which would become a disciplinary camp for political prisoners under the Vichy regime.

=== Refugees during World War II (1940–1945) ===
==== Internment and forced labor under the Vichy regime ====
Historians who studied the camps in the southwest of France noted a hardening of the internment policy under the Vichy regime and a "logic of exclusion."

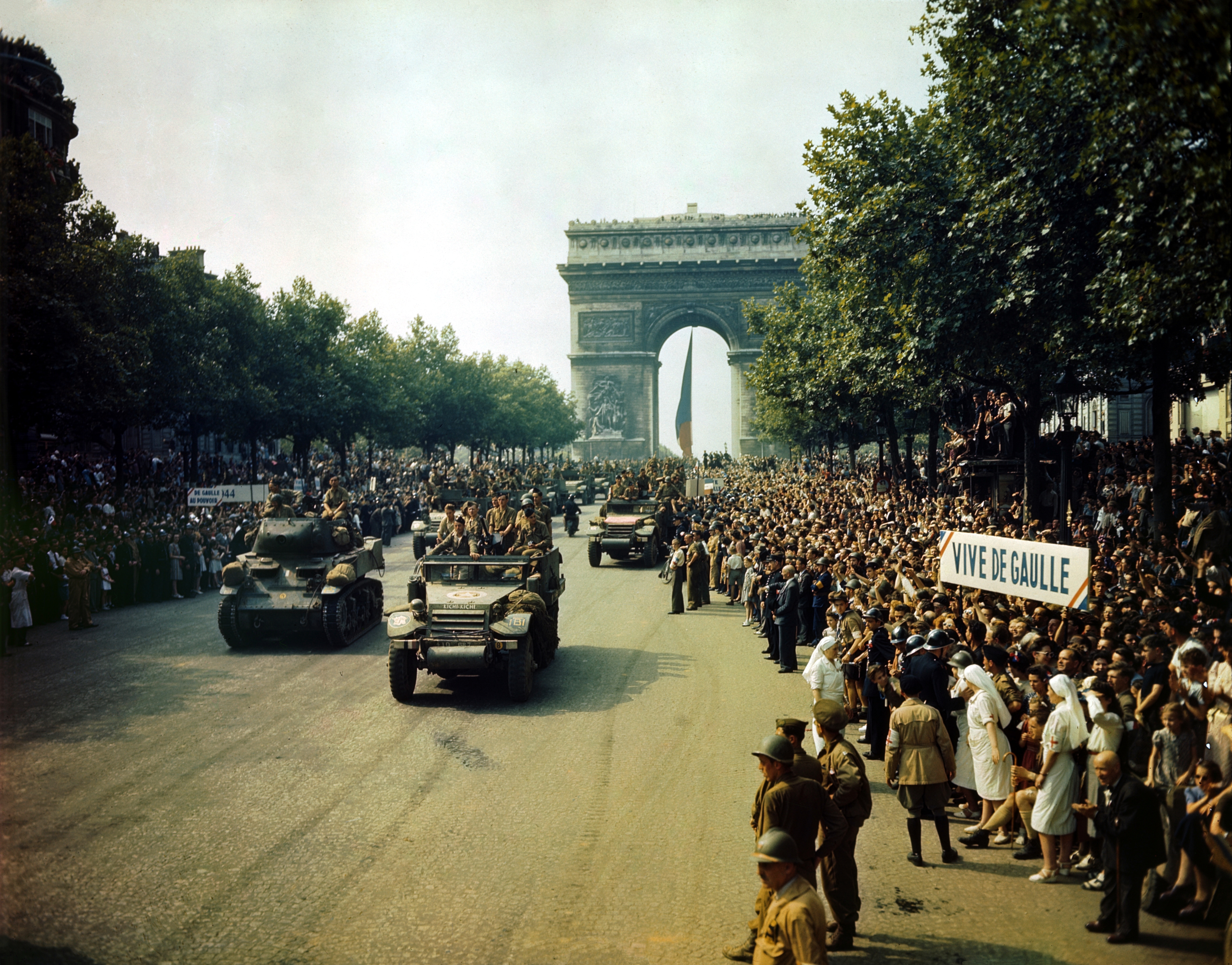
Parade by General Leclerc's 2nd Armored Division on the Champs-Élysées in Paris (26 August 1944). The vanguard of the soldiers who liberated Paris was made up by La Nueve, a company of the Division Leclerc composed mostly of Republican Spaniards.

Republicans were incorporated into the war effort via the Company of Foreign Workers (CTE), which the Vichy regime later turned into the Group of Foreign Workers (GTE) (1940). Between 1942 and 1943, a total of 26,000 Spanish workers from the GTE and others were sent, as part of the Service du travail obligatoire (STO), to the projects of the Organisation Todt on the Atlantic front.

According to historian Lilian Pouységur (1994), the matter of the camps acted as un catalyseur de l'identité républicaine espagnole. (Note: English: A catalyst of the Spanish Republican identity) It had a heavy impact on the Republican imaginary, leaving the memory of a country that was not very open to the fight against fascist forces.

==== Compromise between the French army and the resistance ====
Between 1939 and 1940, many Republicans asked to enlist in the Companies of Foreign Workers and in the battalions of foreigners in the French Army, despite the distrust the French officers had towards the communists bound by the German-Soviet Pact. In late 1942, many joined the Resistance, the Maquis, and the Free French Forces, and even contributed in deciphering the German Enigma cryptographic code (the team of Antonio Camazón). The Republican exiles hoped that, after the fall of Nazism, the liberation of France would help in taking back their country. During the liberation of Paris, the first detachment of Leclerc's army to enter the city was a Spanish platoon.

=== Deportation ===
Spanish workers or Republican resistance fighters who were arrested on French territory and who did not have the status of prisoners of war were deported to various French concentration camps (in Saint-Cyprien or Argelès-sur-Mer, for example) and later to German ones. For instance, Republican women arrested for acts of resistance were sent to the Ravensbrück concentration camp. Scattered in numerous camps, they represented a significant group, especially in the Mauthausen-Gusen compound, where more than 7,200 Spaniards were registered: 4,676 were killed out of a total of 7,288. In total, 12,000 Republican Spaniards were sent to concentration or labor camps between 6 August 1940, which marked the first departure to Mauthausen, and May 1945.

== Exile to Latin America and the United States ==
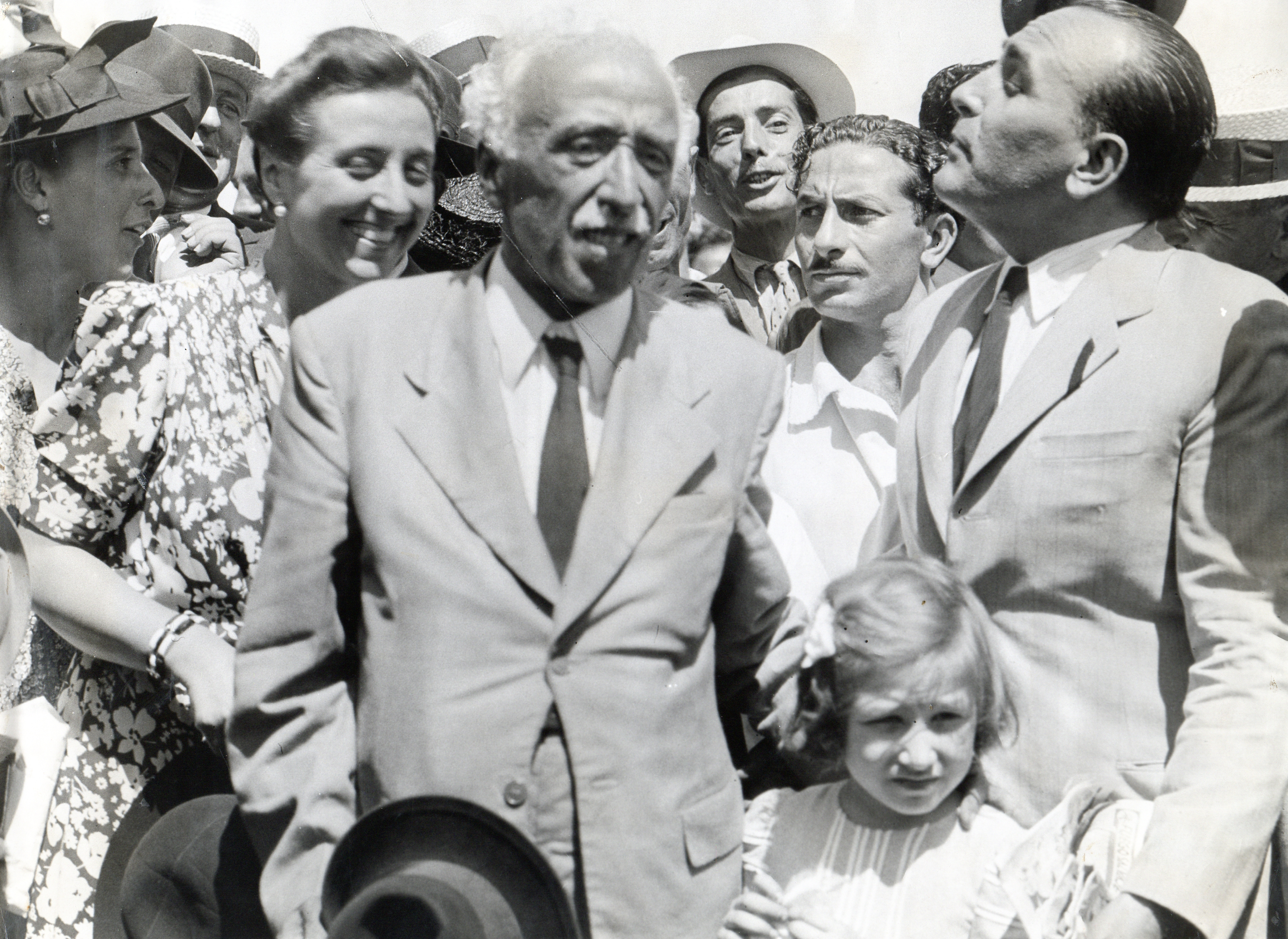
Former President Niceto Alcalá Zamora in exile in Buenos Aires, 1942.

Facing the problem of Spanish refugees, the French government began negotiations with Latin American countries to take them in, but received only three positive responses at first: Mexico, Uruguay, and Chile.

In February 1939, Mexican President Lázaro Cárdenas agreed to receive a part of the Spanish exiles. Mexico was the only country that received the refugees with open arms. In the end, the country accounted for 15 percent of all exiles, thus becoming the second largest recipient after France.

Mexico allocated state funds to establish cultural institution La Casa de España en México (1938–1940)—which later became El Colegio de México—as well as magazine España Peregrina and Editorial Séneca publishing house, with a focus on Spanish culture. Other countries that welcomed refugees—around 2,000—were Argentina, Venezuela, Colombia, and Cuba.

in 1939, Chile chartered the SS Winnipeg, which arrived at Valparaíso with 2,300 Spanish refugees directly from France.

One of the best-known episodes was the voyage of the ocean liner SS Massilia, which set sail on 19 October 1939 from La Rochelle and arrived in Buenos Aires on 5 November. On board were 384 people of various nationalities who were fleeing the war in Europe. More than half were Spanish artists and intellectuals of various professions and trades who opposed Francoism. These included: painter and stage designer Gregorio (Gori) Muñoz, feminist writer Elena Fortún, politician and economist Pere Coromines i Montanya, journalist Amparo Alvajar, among many others.

Writer Rafael Alberti and composer Manuel de Falla went into exile in Argentina. Physicist Blas Cabrera went to Mexico, as well as writers Tomás Segovia, Emilio Prados, Max Aub, and José Bergamín. Physician and biochemist Severo Ochoa, philologists Américo Castro and Tomás Navarro Tomás, writer Ramón J. Sender, professor and politician Fernando de los Ríos, and the family of Federico García Lorca went to the United States. Writer Manuel Altolaguirre went to Cuba. The Generation of '27 was thus scattered throughout Europe and the Americas.

=== The case of Mexico ===
Around 50,000 refugees, with a higher cultural level than the average of the other exiles, headed for Mexico. They were mostly intellectuals, scientists and artists. This contributed to revitalize Mexico. According to historian and philosopher Juan Marichal, el exilio español fue una fortuna [para el país]. (Note: English: Spanish exiles represented good fortune [for the country])

There were also children among the refugees, such as the 500 Niños de Morelia, also known as the Children of War, who embarked from the port of Bordeaux.

The period of adaptation was also different from what prevailed in France at the time. Writer José Gaos, who settled in Mexico, created the neologism transtierro (Note: English: Transplant) to refer to this emigration that transformed into an advanced integration in Latin American cultures, as a reaction to the more commonly used term destierro. (Note: English: Exile or banishment)

=== The case of the United States ===
Many intellectual and political figures found refuge in the United States. Such was the case of Republican politician Victoria Kent, who rebuilt her life there with her partner, philanthropist Louise Crane. They founded the magazine Ibérica, which published news from Spain for republican exiles in the United States. Their archives are kept at Yale University.

The entire family of poet Federico García Lorca, who was assassinated by Franco's regime in 1936, also found refuge in the country. His mother Vicenta Lorca Romero, his father Federico García Rodríguez, his sisters Concepción and Isabel, and his brother Francisco were welcomed into the family of New York-based professors Gloria Giner de los Ríos García and Fernando de los Ríos.

Most of these personalities pursued academic careers at institutions such as Middlebury College or Columbia University, like Laura de los Ríos Giner. According to historian Bárbara Ortuño Martínez, the fact that most of the exiles found work in the numerous university institutions scattered throughout the vast U.S. territory led in many cases to isolation and cultural marginalization among the exile community.

== Exile to the Soviet Union ==
The numbers of Republicans who emigrated to the Soviet Union (USSR) have been the subject of discussion. Most historians agree on their estimates of several thousand people, which were exclusively cadres of the Communist Party of Spain accompanied by their families. It has been estimated that between 2,900 and 3,200 children were sent to the USSR by their parents between March 1937 and October 1938. Forgotten after the defeat of the Republic, they met various fates. Many received Soviet citizenship and remained in post-Soviet Russia, others managed to flee—like Valentín González, after having been interned in Vorkutlag, a Gulag labor camp—and yet others scattered or died fighting for their new homeland (such as the case of Dolores Ibárruri's son) during the Second World War. This episode in history has given rise to an abundant literature.

== Exile to French Algeria ==
As Franco's troops advanced, the Republicans from Castellón and Alicante had to escape by sea on board more than forty ships, such as HMS Galatea and the SS Stanbrook, which set course for North Africa carrying women, men, and children in inhumane conditions. The SS Stanbrook was the last ship to sail from Alicante on 28 March 1939, with 2,638 refugees. But more than 20,000 were unable to board it and were transferred by the Francoist troops to concentration camps such as Los Almendros and Albatera, or temporary locations such as the Santa Bárbara Castle or the Alicante Bullring. The SS Stanbrook arrived at the port of Mers El Kébir, near Oran.

=== Camps in French Algeria ===
These refugees were interned in so-called refugee camps, which were actually forced labor camps located in Boghar, such as the Morand internment camp and Camp Suzzoni. Around 15,000 Spanish refugees in mainland France were deported to French Algeria over the summer. In total, the number of Spaniards who passed through the North African camps has been estimated at 30,000. Among the fifty camps used to intern Spaniards, in addition to those already mentioned, the main ones are: Relizane, Bouarfa, Settat, Oued-Akrouch, Kénadsa, and Tandara. Disciplinary or punishment camps were set up in Hadjerat M'Guil, Aïn El Orak, Méridja, Djelfa, and Berrouaghia. Many of these refugees met their deaths in the camps in North Africa.

== Post-war exiles (1945–1975) ==
Although the winning side had been recognized by international observers after the fall of Barcelona, things were not yet settled in Spain. Spaniards had been left alienated after the Second World War. The Francoist police persecuted the opposition and purged villages, causing a situation that historians refer to as the posguerra (Note: English: Post-war) period—from 1938 to the early sixties, during which exiles continued to flee from the regime.

== Later evolution of the Republican exile ==
Some exiles, mainly men of military age, found themselves integrated as combatants in the imminent Second World War, primarily in the territory of metropolitan France itself, but also in the USSR, North Africa, and a large part of that war's theaters, either as regular combatants or participating in the actions of the Resistance. Almost 9,000 Republican Spaniards were also among those who were deported to Nazi concentration camps.

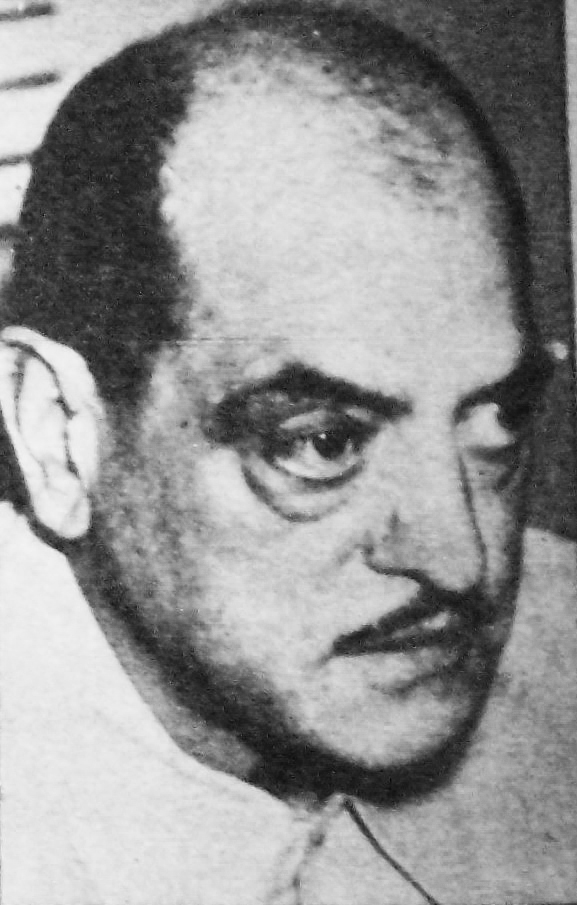
Luis Buñuel

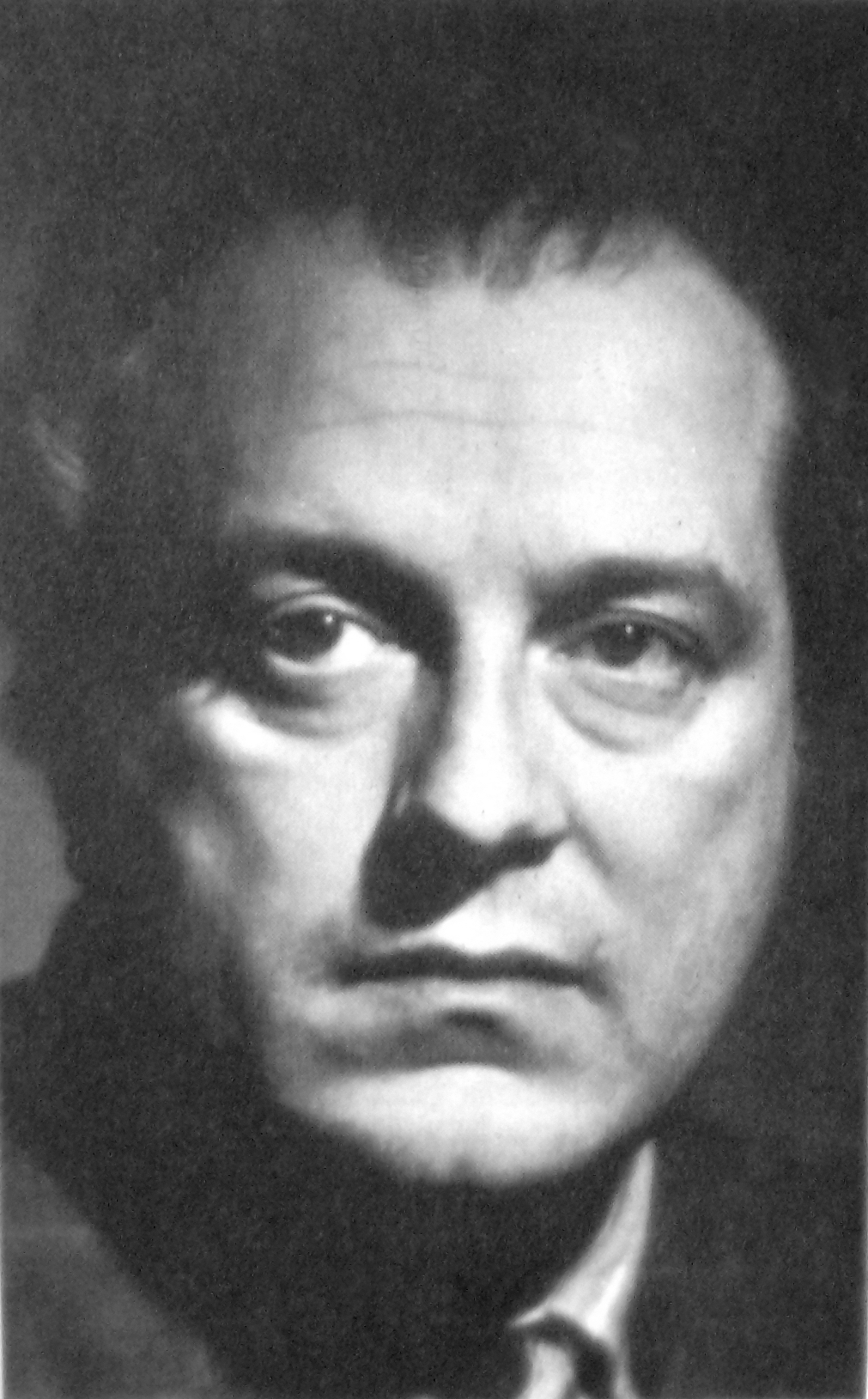
Rafael Alberti

Part of the Republican exiles went to Latin America, where they benefited from an intellectual and artistic group made up mostly of the institutions derived from Krausism, such as the Institución Libre de Enseñanza, the Junta para Ampliación de Estudios e Investigaciones Científicas, the Residencia de Estudiantes, the Centro de Estudios Históricos, the Instituto-Escuela, and the Museo Pedagógico Nacional, among others. This brain drain impoverished the cultural life in post-war Spain, but enriched that of the host countries: Mexico (thanks to the support of President Lázaro Cárdenas), Argentina, and the United States, among others. More than 500 physicians settled in Mexico. Most of the members of the Generation of 1914, the Generation of '27, and the various historical avant-garde movements emigrated to other lands. Some referred to this as being transplanted or exiled.

Many were unable to return to their homeland or did so at a very old age after the restoration of democracy, although there were numerous cases of exiles who returned to Spain during the Francoist era, including, among others, the case of General Vicente Rojo Lluch, and writers Manuel Altolaguirre and José Bergamín. There were others who chose to stay and suffered reprisals, such as Antonio Rodríguez-Moñino, or lived in a kind of internal exile, such as Juan Gil-Albert or Vicente Aleixandre.

Some of these intellectuals included:
Biologists

- Severo Ochoa
- Enrique Rioja Lo Bianco

Physicists

- Arturo Duperier Vallesa
- Blas Cabrera
- Onofre Rojo Asenjo

Chemists

- Enrique Moles Ormella
- Francisco Giral

Mathematicians

- Enrique Jiménez González
- Ricardo Vinós Santos
- Lorenzo Alcaraz

Engineers

- Francisco Rived Revilla

Astronomers

- Pedro Carrasco Garrorena
- Marcelo Santaló

Oceanographers

- Odón de Buen y del Cos

Writers

- Manuel Azaña
- Max Aub
- Ramón J. Sender
- Arturo Barea
- Manuel Andújar
- Rafael Alberti
- Pedro Salinas
- Luis Cernuda
- Emilio Prados
- Paulino Masip
- María Zambrano

Filmmakers

- Luis Buñuel

Artists

- Josep Gausachs
- Óscar Domínguez
- Pablo Picasso

Historians

- Claudio Sánchez-Albornoz

Philologists

- Tomás Navarro Tomás

Pedagogues

- José Castillejo
- Lorenzo Luzuriaga

Philosophers

- Juan David García Bacca

Essayists

- Anselmo Carretero

== Official commemoration of the 80th anniversary (2019) ==
=== Spain ===
In Spain, three exhibitions marked the beginning of the commemorations of the 80th anniversary of the Republican exile.

=== France ===
France officially commemorated the 80th anniversary of La Retirada especially in Paris, (Note: English: Today we pay tribute to the Spanish Republicans who fled the Franco regime during La Retirada. Eighty years ago, almost 500,000 Spaniards crossed the border through the Pyrénées to escape fascism and a more than likely death.) in the Pyrénées-Orientales, and throughout the south of the country, in memory of the 500,000 Republican Spaniards who crossed the border into France in early 1939. For the first time, a Spanish Prime Minister, Pedro Sánchez, visited the tomb of the last president of the Second Spanish Republic, Manuel Azaña, in Montauban. He also paid tribute in the town of Collioure to poet Antonio Machado, who died and was buried there in 1939.

In the French capital, the Council of Paris voted unanimously to dedicate a garden and a street to the memory of Federica Montseny and Neus Català, respectively. There were ceremonies held in front of the Jardin des Combattants-de-la-Nueve; at the Paris City Hall; in front of the plaques in the memory of Domingo Tejero Pérez, José Barón Carreño, Conrad Miret i Musté (all officially declared by the French government as having "died for France"); in front of the plaque in memory of Manuel Pinto Queiroz Ruiz, and at Père Lachaise Cemetery, where the monument to the "Spaniards who died for freedom" is located, in honor of the Spanish Republic; in front of the graves of Juan Negrín and Francisco Boix, and in Mont Valérien, in the Mémorial de la France combattante inaugurated by Charles de Gaulle on 18 June 1960.

== See also ==
- Spanish Republican government in exile
- La Retirada
- Spanish diaspora
- Spanish immigration to France
- Women in exile during Francoist Spain

== Bibliography ==
=== Books ===
- Bennassar, Bartolomé (2004). La Guerre d'Espagne et ses lendemains (in French). Paris: Éditions Perrin. ISBN 2-262-02001-9.
- Berdah, Jean-François (2008). "The Devil in France. The Tragedy of Spanish Republicans and French Policy after the Civil War (1936–1945)". In Hálfdanarson, Guðmundur (ed.). Discrimination and Tolerance in Historical Perspective. CLIOHRES. pp. 301–318. ISBN 9788884925589.
- Dreyfus-Armand, Geneviève (1999). L'exil des républicains espagnols en France. De la Guerre civile à la mort de Franco (in French). Paris: Éditions Albin Michel. ISBN 2226107215.
- Dreyfus-Armand, Geneviève (2020). "9. Spanish Republicans Exiled in France during the Second World War: War and Resistance". In Brenneis, Sara J.; Herrmann, Gina (eds.). Spain, the Second World War, and the Holocaust. History and Representation. Toronto: University of Toronto Press. pp. 185–198. doi:10.3138/9781487532505-013. ISBN 9781487532505.
- Fau, Jean-Claude (1994). "Le camp de réfugiés espagnols de Septfonds (Tarn-et-Garonne), 1939–1940". In Cohen, Monique-Lise; Malo, Éric (eds.). Les camps du sud-ouest de la France. Exclusion, internement et déportation, 1939–1944 (in French). Toulouse: Éditions Privat. pp. 35–41. ISBN 2-7089-5375-3.
- Gaida, Peter (2014). "Les camps en Afrique du Nord". Camps de travail sous Vichy (in French). Lulu.com. pp. 367–405. ISBN 9781291842739.
- Herrerín, Ángel; Balado, Francisco M.; García, Beatriz (2023). Los viajes de las ideas en las migraciones transatlánticas. Individuos, grupos y redes (in Spanish). Madrid: National University of Distance Education. ISBN 9788436280067.
- Herrmann, Gina (2020). "12. Spanish and Catalan Women in Ravensbrück". In Brenneis, Sara J.; Herrmann, Gina (eds.). Spain, the Second World War, and the Holocaust. History and Representation. Toronto: University of Toronto Press. pp. 237–257. doi:10.3138/9781487532505-013. ISBN 9781487532505.
- Mesquida, Evelyn (2016). La Nueve: los españoles que liberaron París (in Spanish). Madrid: Ediciones B. ISBN 9788466659352.
- Milza, Pierre; Peschanski, Denis (1994). Exils et migration: Italiens et Espagnols en France (1938–1946) (in French). Paris: L'Harmattan. ISBN 2738430538.
- Parello, Vincent (2010). "Introduction générale". Des réfugiés espagnols de la guerre civile (in French). Perpignan, France: Presses universitaires de Perpignan. pp. 11–18. ISBN 978-2-35412-057-3.
- Pérez Rodríguez, Jonay (2002). Los indeseables españoles: La gestión de los refugiados en Francia (1936-1945) (PDF) (in Spanish). Madrid: Centre for Political and Constitutional Studies. ISBN 978-84-259-1935-0.
- Pouységur, Lilian (1994). "Les réfugiés républicains espagnols dans le sud-ouest de la France". In Cohen, Monique-Lise; Malo, Éric (eds.). Les camps du sud-ouest de la France. Exclusion, internement et déportation, 1939–1944 (in French). Toulouse: Éditions Privat. pp. 25–34. ISBN 2-7089-5375-3.
- Rubió Coromina, Jordi (2015). L'éxode català de 1936 a través dels pirineus (in Catalan). Maçanet de la Selva, Catalonia: Editorial Gregal. ISBN 978-84-943898-5-6.
- Ruiz, Julius (2005). "5. The Decontamination of Madrid: The Purges of Civil Servants, Professionals, and Others". Franco's Justice: Repression in Madrid after the Spanish Civil War. Oxford: Clarendon Press. pp. 165–191. ISBN 0-19-928183-1.
- Sánchez Vázquez, Adolfo (2003). "Del destierro al transtierro". A tiempo y destiempo: Antología de ensayos (in Spanish). Mexico City: Fondo de Cultura Económica. pp. 549–563. ISBN 9681670000.

=== Journals ===
- Alted Vigil, Alicia (2005). "El «instante congelado» del exilio de los niños de la guerra civil española". DEP. Deportate, Esuli, Profughe. (in Spanish). La deportazione dei bambini. Memorie. (3). Venice: Ca' Foscari University of Venice: 264–281. ISSN 1824-4483.
- Charaudeau, Anne (October 1992). "Les réfugiés espagnols dans les camps d'internement en Afrique du Nord". Hommes & Migrations (in French). 1158 (1158). Paris: Cité nationale de l'histoire de l'immigration: 23–28. doi:10.3406/homig.1992.1894. ISSN 2262-3353.
- Corderot, Didier (December 2017). "Les enfants de la guerre d'Espagne ou les parcours sinueux de la mémoire". Mémoires en jeu (in French) (5): 106–113. ISSN 2497-2711.
- Dreyfus-Armand, Geneviève (2011). "L'accueil des enfants espagnols en France pendant la guerre d'Espagne et après la victoire franquiste". Documents pour l'Histoire du Français Langue Étrangère ou Seconde (in French). Accueil et formation des enfants étrangers en France de la fin du XIXe siècle au début de la Deuxième Guerre mondiale (46). Société internationale pour l'Histoire du Français Langue Etrangère ou Seconde: 105–122. doi:10.4000/dhfles.2095.
- Kateb, Kamel (January 2007). "Les immigrés espagnols dans les camps en Algérie (1939–1941)". Les Annales de Démographie Historique (in French). 113 (1). Paris: Éditions Belin: 155–175. doi:10.3917/adh.113.0155. ISSN 1776-2774.
- Keren, Célia (2018). "Quand la CGT faisait de l'humanitaire : l'accueil des enfants d'Espagne (1936-1939)" [When the CGT did humanitarian work: Spanish children evacuated to France (1936–1939)]. Le Mouvement Social (in French). 264 (3). Translated by Hamilton, Emily. Paris: Presses de Sciences Po: 15–39. doi:10.3917/lms.264.0015. ISSN 1961-8646.
- López Sánchez, José María; Murga Castro, Idoia (June 2018). "Post-war scenarios. Culture in times of war, exile and repression, 1936-1951". Culture & History Digital Journal. 7 (1). Madrid: Spanish National Research Council. doi:10.3989/chdj.2018.v7.i1. hdl:10261/195777. ISSN 2253-797X.
- Ortuño Martínez, Bárbara (2011). Faber, Sebastiaan; Martínez-Carazo, Cristina (eds.). "Contra el olvido: el exilio español en Estados Unidos". Diacronie studi di storia contemporanea (in Spanish). 3. «Spagna Anno Zero»: la guerra come soluzione (7). Bologna: Associazione culturale "Diacronie". doi:10.4000/diacronie.3158. ISSN 2038-0925.
- Ortuño Martínez, Bárbara (2012). "«En busca de un submarino». Crónica a bordo del buque insignia del exilio republicano en Argentina: el Massilia". Cahiers de civilisation espagnole contemporaine. De 1808 au temps présent (in Spanish) (9). Centre de recherches ibériques et ibéro-américaines. doi:10.4000/ccec.4242. ISSN 1957-7761.
- Rodrigo, Javier; Alegre Lorenz, David (June 2022). "Before the Convention: The Spanish Civil War and Challenges for Research on Refugee History" (PDF). Refugee Survey Quarterly. 41 (2). Oxford: Oxford University Press: 196–217. doi:10.1093/rsq/hdac005. ISSN 1020-4067.
- Ruiz-Manjón Cabeza, Octavio (2007). "Gloria Giner de los Ríos: noticia biográfica de una madrileña". Cuadernos de historia contemporánea (in Spanish) (1). Madrid: Complutense University of Madrid: 265–272. ISSN 0214-400X.
- Young, Glennys (2014). "To Russia with 'Spain': Spanish Exiles in the USSR and the Longue Durée of Soviet History". Kritika: Explorations in Russian and Eurasian History. 15 (2). Indiana: Slavica Publishers: 395–420. doi:10.1353/kri.2014.0031. ISSN 1538-5000.

=== Other publications ===
- "The Basque Child Refugees in the UK" (PDF). Zine by the Students of the University of Leeds. Leeds, United Kingdom: Basque Children of '37 Association UK. 2001.
- Córdoba Guzmán, Paulo Tirso (2018). Repensar el transtierro: Una historia conceptual y sus implicaciones para la teoría hermenéutica (M.A. in Philosophy thesis) (in Spanish). Bogotá: University of the Rosary.
- Peschanski, Denis (2000). Les camps français d'internement (1938-1946) (PDF) (PhD in history thesis) (in French). Paris: Paris 1 Panthéon-Sorbonne University.
- Sánchez-Alonso, Blanca; Santiago-Caballero, Carlos (2021). The loss of human capital after the Spanish Civil War (Working Papers in Economic History). Madrid: Charles III University of Madrid. ISSN 2341-2542.
- Willis, Gary. What were the British motivations for and against receiving Basque refugees during the Spanish Civil War? (MRes in Historical Research thesis). University of London.
