= La Retirada =

1939 exodus of Spanish refugees to France

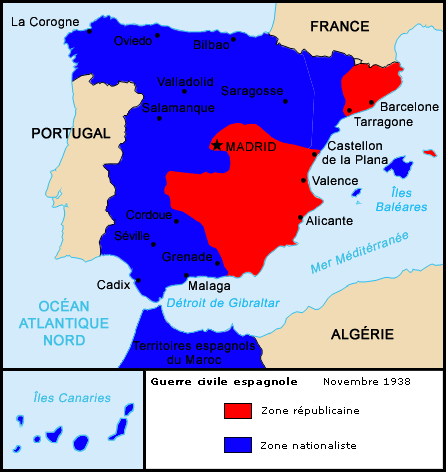
Spain in December 1938. Catalonia is colored red in the northeast corner.

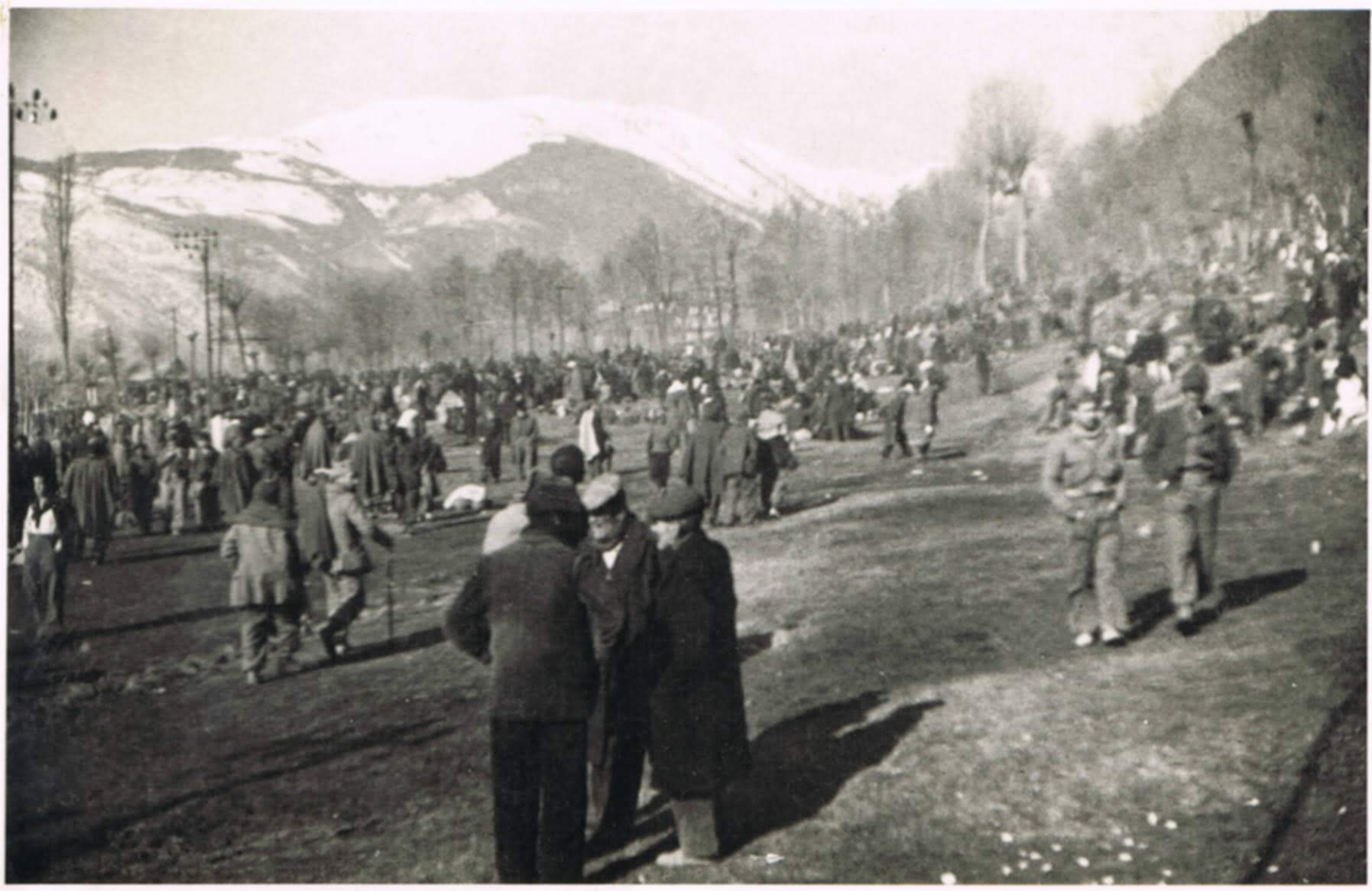
Refugees waiting to cross the border into France.

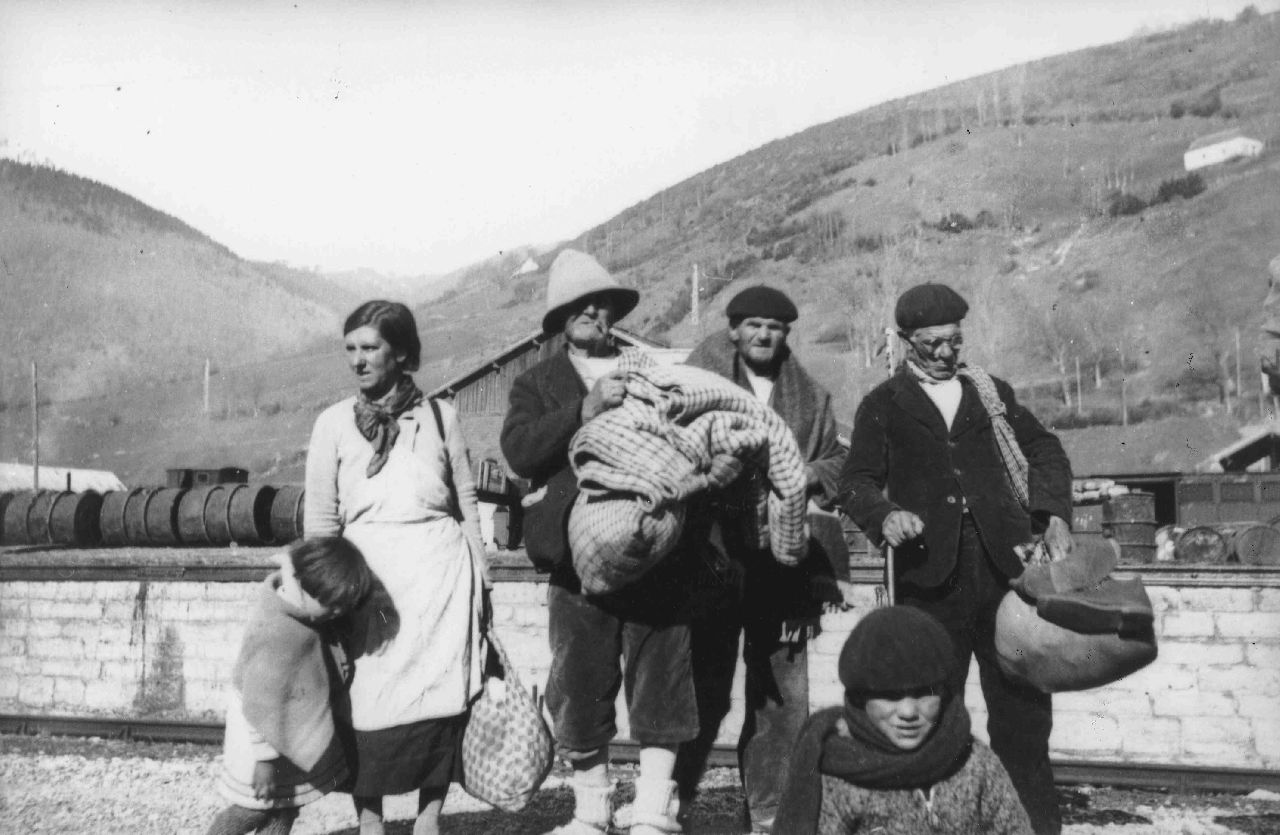
Civilian refugees at the border. On arrival in France, women and children were usually separated from men of military age.

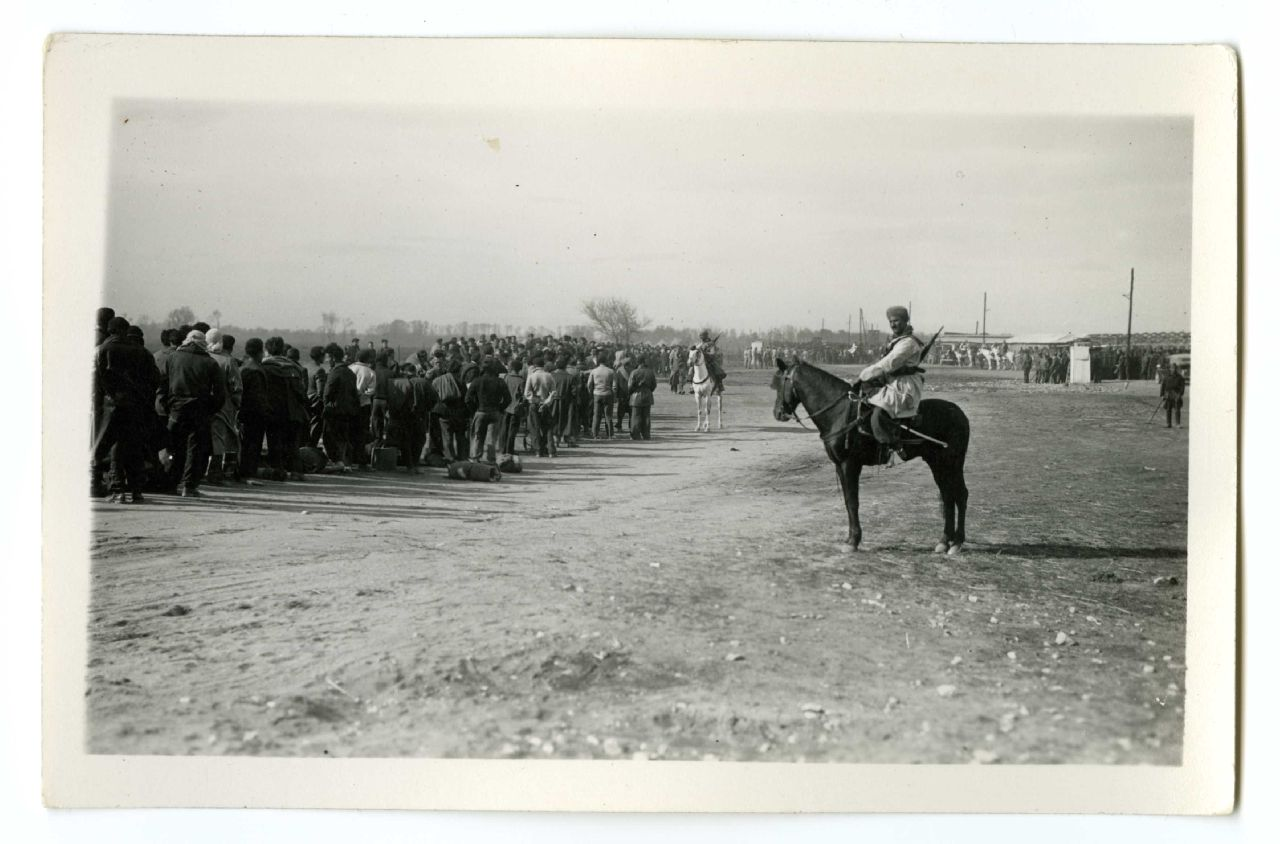
African Spahis (on horseback) of the French army guard a column of Republican refugees.

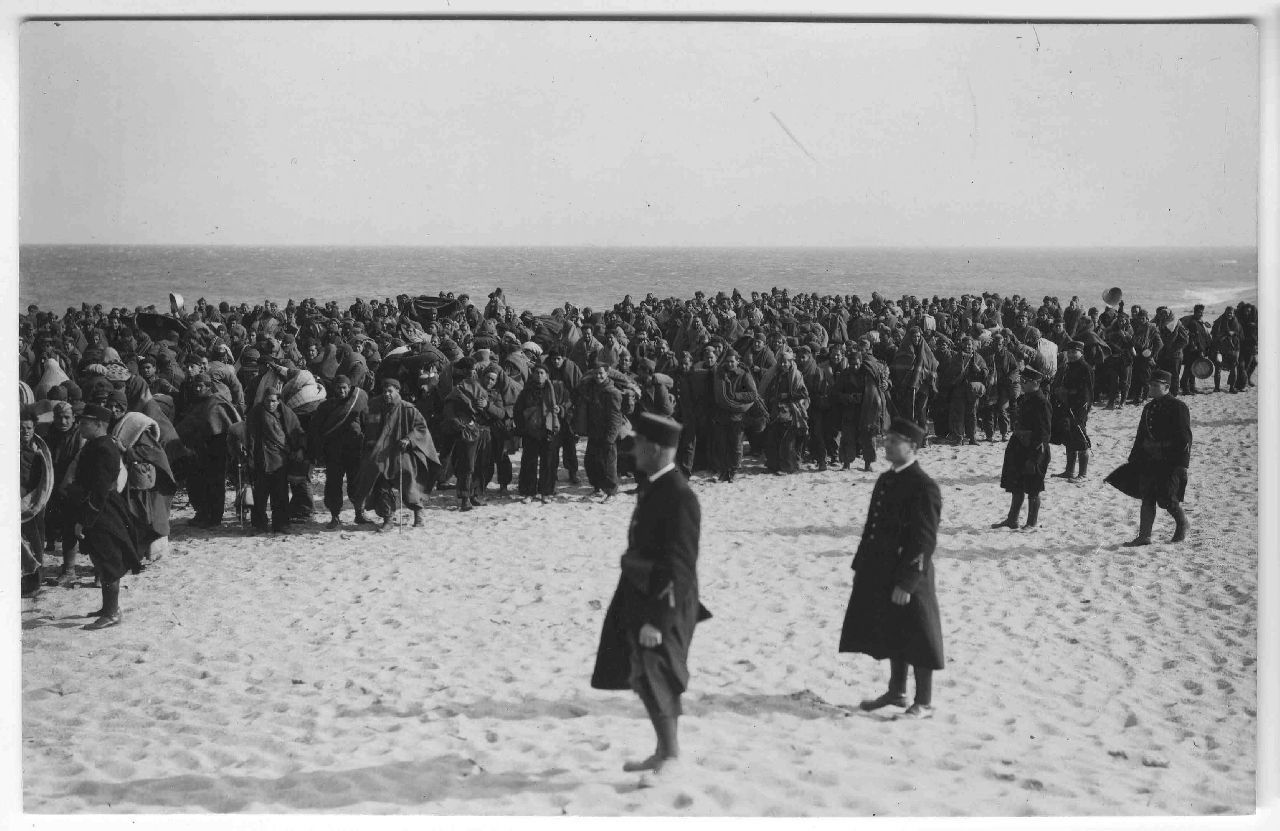
Guarded by French soldiers, Republican soldiers arrive at the Argelers concentration camp.

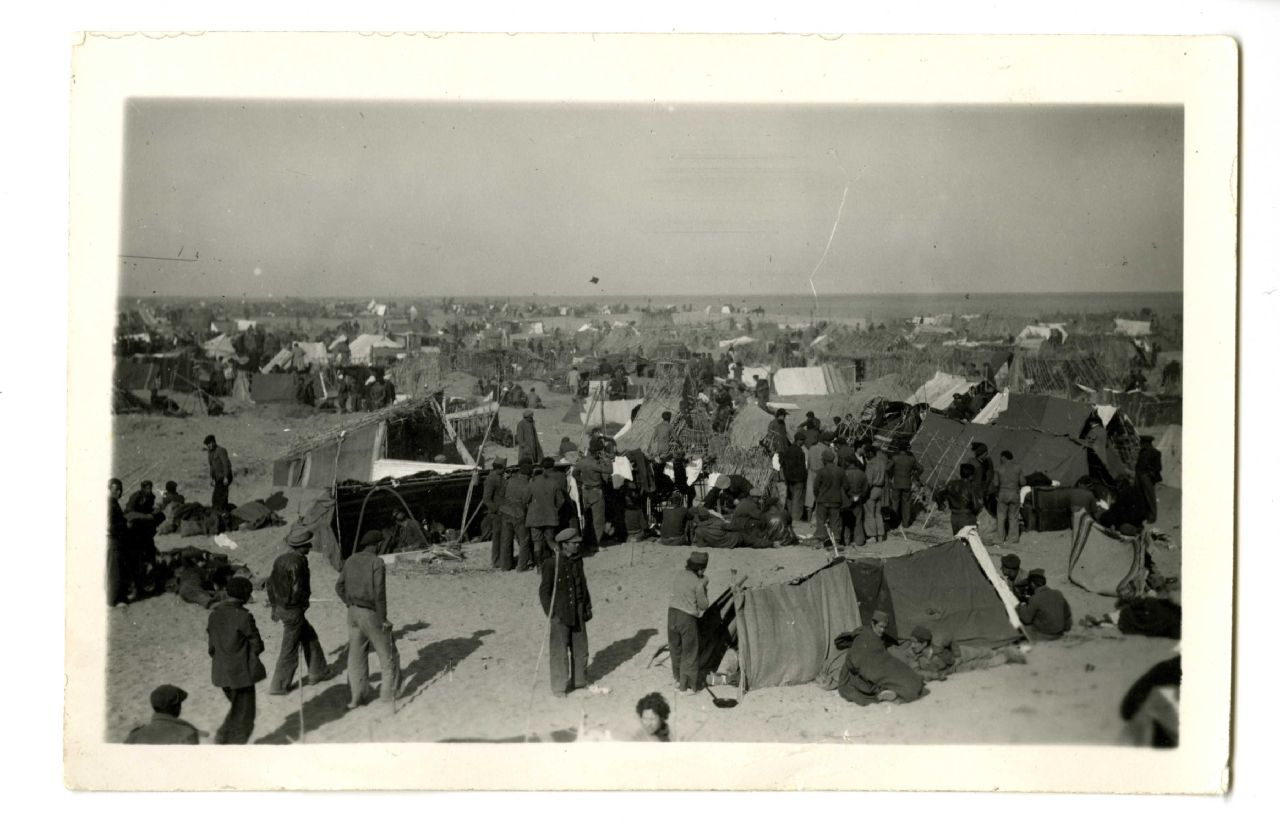
The refugee camp on the beach of Argelès-sur-Mer.

La Retirada (English: the withdrawal or the retreat) was the exodus to France from Spain between 28 January 1939 and 15 February 1939 of nearly 500,000 Republican soldiers and civilians near the end of the Spanish Civil War. The exodus was caused by the conquest of Catalonia, including the city of Barcelona, by the fascist Nationalist army of Francisco Franco. With the capture of Catalonia, the Civil War soon ended in victory for the Nationalists.

France was unprepared for the size of the exodus and did not give a warm welcome to the refugees. The Spaniards endured poor conditions in makeshift camps or were scattered around France. Families were separated. About 300,000 refugees returned, either voluntarily or forced, to Spain within a few months. Between 160,000 and 180,000 remained in France, joining labor battalions or the Foreign Legion or working in agriculture and industry. About 30,000 emigrated to third countries, especially Mexico.

== Background ==
Large scale displacement of people was a characteristic of the Spanish Civil War (1936–1939). Catalonia and the city of Barcelona as a stronghold of the leftist Republicans received many internally displaced persons (IDPs) from other regions of Spain. The number of IDPs in Catalonia at the end of 1938 is estimated at one million. The flow of displaced people also went the other direction as rightist Nationalist supporters, Catholic clergy, and victims of communist and anarchist repression fled Catalonia for Nationalist controlled territory or left Spain.

The Nationalist victory in the Battle of the Ebro (July to November 1938) destroyed the Republican army's capability to resist the Nationalist army. On 23 December 1938, Franco launched an offensive to conquer Barcelona and Catalonia. The victory of the Nationalists in Catalonia sealed the fate of Republican Spain. By 31 March 1939 the Nationalists controlled all of Spain and the Civil War was over.

== Refugees ==
The flight of refugees from Spain to France was precipitated by the fall of Barcelona to the Nationalist Army on 26 January 1939. The French government had anticipated the flight of some refugees from Spain and closed the border to entrants on 26 and 27 January. Large numbers of people waited near the border until France reopened it on 28 January to women, children, and elderly people only. On 5 February, France opened the border to unarmed men and Republican military units began to enter France.

The refugees travelled to the border mostly on foot but also in trucks and carts, often with only the clothes on their backs. Along the way refugee columns were attacked by air forces of Fascist Italy and Nazi Germany who were aiding the Nationalists. Much of the terrain the refugees traversed was snow-covered and the winter temperatures were below freezing.

Most estimates place the number of Spanish refugees at nearly 500,000. The government of France estimated the number of Spanish refugees crossing the border during the Retirada at only 440,000: 170,000 women, children, and elderly; 40,000 civilian men, 10,000 wounded men; and 220,000 soldiers. The French government was unprepared for an exodus of this magnitude. Moreover, France's traditional view of itself as the "home of universal rights and the refuge for the persecuted in Europe" had been eroded by the growth of right wing political parties and fear by the French public of ideological conflicts spread by a growing number of foreign refugees in France. In 1938, several decrees by the French government denied rights to refugees and authorized the government to set up internment camps for "undesirable" foreigners. The Republican refugees arriving at the border with France anticipated a better reception than they received.

The refugees were associated with several leftist Spanish organizations of which the largest were the Spanish Libertarian Movement (anarchists and libertarians), the Spanish Socialist Workers' Party, the Communist Party of Spain and the Republican Left of Catalonia. Among the refugees were members of the POUM to which George Orwell belonged during his time as a soldier in Spain.

The Spanish fleeing to France saw themselves as fighters against fascism and had expectations of continuing their struggle against the Franco government. The French right-wing press, however, characterized them as "fugitives, deserters, and murderers" and the government called them "human hordes." France, facing the imminent threat of Nazi Germany, had no wish to alienate the Franco government of Spain by encouraging the refugees to continue their fight against the Nationalists.

== French response ==
The French had 50,000 police and gendarmes along a 150 km (93 miles) section of the border with Spain, but they were poorly prepared for a large influx of refugees. The French planned for 2,000 refugees per day, but on the first four days of the Retirada 140,000 Spaniards crossed the border. Provision for food, sanitation, and shelter were woefully inadequate. From 6 to 9 February the stream of refugees waiting to cross the border was 30 km (19 miles) long. The job of the French authorities was both to assist the refugees and to prevent threats by the refugees to the security of France. A number of private organizations, notably the Friends Service Council (Quakers) and the National Joint Committee for Spanish Relief (NJC), were present to assist in the relief effort.

On arrival in France, authorities separated men of military age from women, children, and elderly and confiscated most of the possessions, including weapons, which the refugees carried with them. Families were separated. Most of the non-combatants were transported to many places around France and housed in abandoned buildings. The men of military age and some women and children were placed in hastily created concentration camps near the border with Spain. The refugees were forbidden to travel outside their camps.

The largest refugee camp was Argelers concentration camp located on a beach near the Mediterranean Sea about 20 km (12 miles) north of the Spanish border. Argelers was envisioned as a camp to intern Spanish combatants, although several thousand women and children were in the camp population which reached more than 100,000. The first refugees arriving in Argelers found "nothing save the barbed wire." Argelers camp "is on a sandy expanse by the sea. There is no shelter of any sort from wind, sand, or rain. A bitterly cold wind from the mountains has produced a raging sandstorm...There is a great deal of dysentery probably from lack of good water and absence of sanitary arrangements." Refugees built shacks and dug holes in the sand for shelter.

== Repatriation ==
French attempts to repatriate, sometimes by force, the refugees began almost immediately and the number of refugees interned in camps in southern France declined from 275,000 in March 1939 to 222,000 in April, 173,000 in June, and 84,000 in August. Many others, mostly women and children scattered around France, also returned to Spain. A motivating factor for refugees to return to Spain was to reunite with family members. By the end of 1939, 300,000 of the Spanish had returned to Spain. Remaining in France were 160,000 to 180,000.

The refugees returning to Spain were not stripped of their citizenship by the Franco government, but remained for many years outside the mainstream of Spanish society and many barely subsisted, depending in part on assistance from international aid organizations. The Law of Political Responsibilities imposed penalties on the returnees.

The refugees remaining in France included many employed in work projects, seasonal labor, or enlisted in the French Foreign Legion. In April 1940, fifty-five thousand men were placed in paramilitary labor groups which worked on fortifications and other military-related projects. Forty thousand men and women engaged in seasonal agricultural and industrial work. Six thousand Spanish men joined the Foreign Legion. About 30,000 Spanish refugees in France with the resources to pay for their passage emigrated to third countries, especially Mexico.

The presence of the refugees in France became more acceptable to the French public with the beginning of World War II in September 1939. The remaining refugees were seen as assets to serve in French military forces or augment the labor force. With the German conquest of France in 1940, many of the Spaniards were again interned in concentration camps, although others played an important part in resisting the German occupation. In 1944, the first armored vehicle to enter Paris after the expulsion of the Germans was driven by a Spanish refugee.

== See also ==
- Gurs internment camp
- Vernet camp
- Camí de la Retirada
- Spanish Republican exiles
