= Col d'Ares =

Col d'Ares / Coll d'Ares
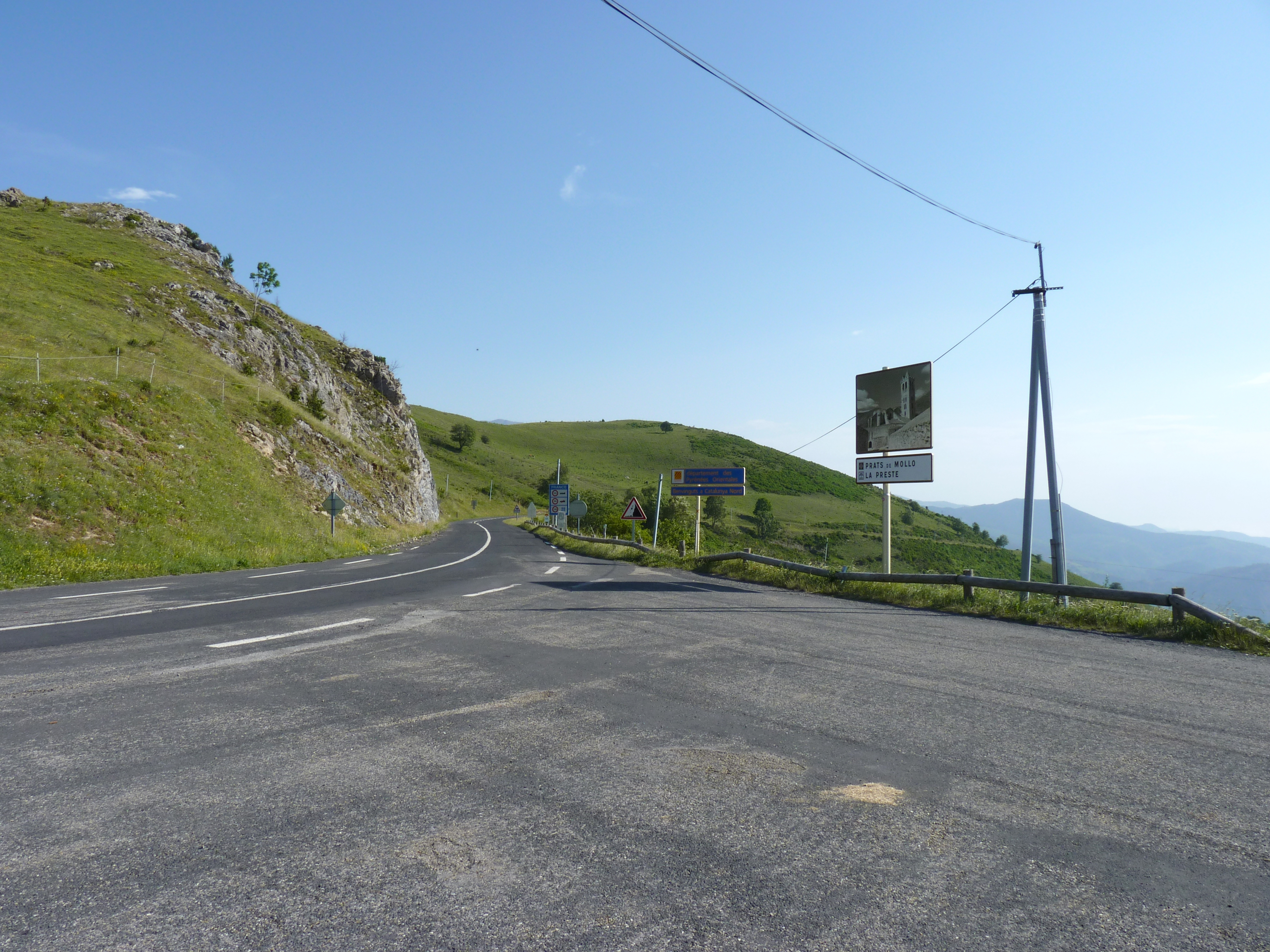
- French side of the Col d'Ares

- Location within Pyrenees
- Elevation: 1,513 metres (4,964 ft)

Third Approach
- Location: Pyrénées-Orientales, France; Catalonia, Spain
- Range: Pyrenees
- Coordinates: 42°22′2″N 2°27′24″E

Col d'Ares (French: [kɔldaʁ]) or Coll d'Ares (Catalan: [ˈkɔʎ ˈdaɾəs]) (el. 1513 m) is a mountain pass in the Pyrenees on the border between France and Spain.

It connects Prats-de-Mollo in France with Molló in Catalonia, Spain.

== History ==
In 1691, during the Nine Years' War, the Spanish passed through the Col d'Ares to try taking Prats-de-Mollo, without success.

This pass also used during the Retirada during the Spanish Civil War by fleeing Spaniards supporting the Republican cause.

== See also ==
- List of highest paved roads in Europe
- List of mountain passes
