= Camí de la Retirada =

Coordinates: 42.367°N 2.456°E

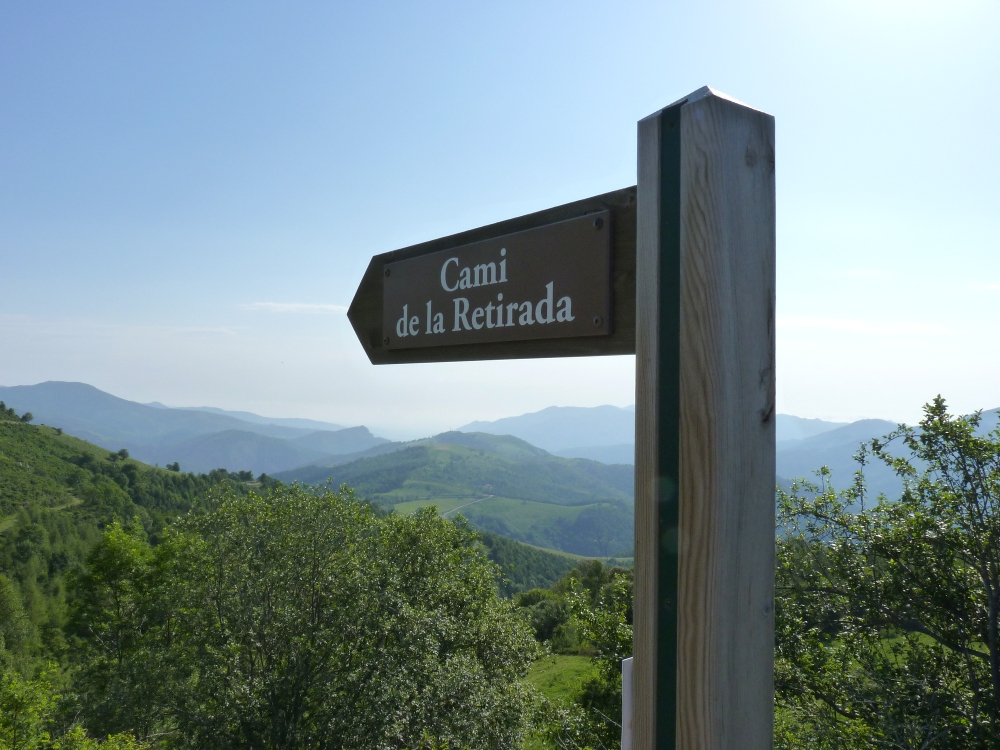
Signpost of the Molló path at Col d'Ares

Camí de la Retirada (Catalan: [kəˈmi ðə lə rə.tiˈɾa.də], Spanish: Camino de la Retirada) ("Path of the Retreat") refers to routes and paths in the eastern Pyrenees used by Republican exiles at the end of the Spanish Civil War. One of the best known paths, today signposted as a trail for hiking or biking, runs for 14 kilometres (8.7 mi) from Molló to Prats de Molló via Col d'Ares at 1,513 metres (4,964 ft) above sea level. It is estimated that about 100,000 people of all ages used this path in January and February, 1939.

== History ==
The fall of Barcelona on 26 January 1939 caused a mass exodus of both civilians and soldiers who fled to the French border. This withdrawal – known in Catalonia as La Retirada – led to the displacement of close to 500,000 people, one of the largest refugee crises in Europe of all time. Mountain paths in Cerdanya and Ripollès were used as alternatives to increasingly impassable roads in Alt Empordà. All refugees entering France were disarmed and arrested.

== See also ==
- Camp de concentration d'Argelès-sur-Mer
