= Antonio Camazón =

Spanish military intelligence officer

Faustino Antonio Camazón Valentín
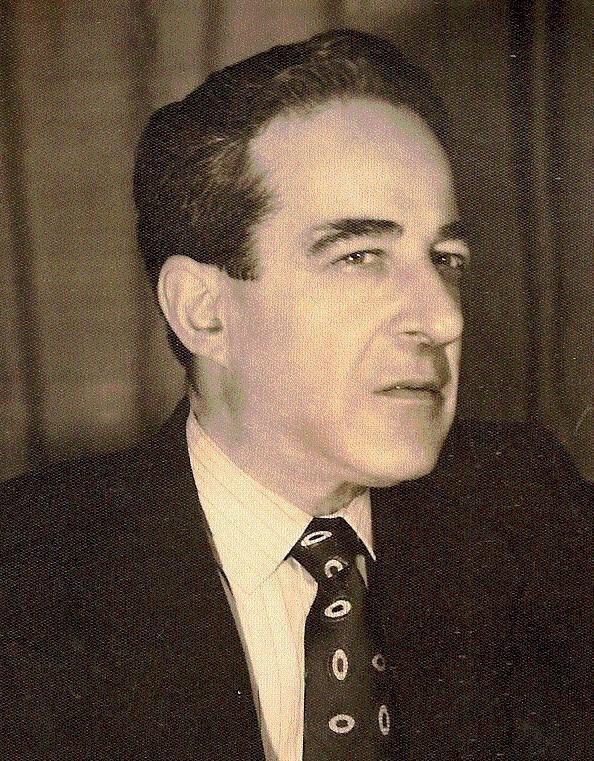
- Born: 1901; Valladolid, Castilla y León, Spain
- Died: 1976 (aged 74–75); Jaca, Aragón, Spain
- Occupation(s): Cryptographer and spy.
- Employer: Direction générale de la Sécurité extérieure

Faustino Antonio Camazón Valentín (1901 – 19 October 1982) was a Spanish cryptographer and spy.

== Biography ==
At the age of twelve, he stowed away on a ship and arrived in Colombia. After being repatriated, his parents sent him to Madrid, where he stood out for his skills in mathematics, languages, and cryptography. According to his nephew, "he gave lessons at embassies and learned French, English, and German... He was part of the tertulia of Santiago Ramón y Cajal at the Café de Chinitas, and he mentions him in his memoirs as an enthusiast of cryptography."

As a commissioner and high-ranking officer in the Republican police, he solved several murders and at least one kidnapping. His debut as a cryptographer took place in North Africa during the search for Abd el-Krim, where he not only learned Arabic but eventually mastered four languages and came to know as many as twelve, including Japanese. During the Spanish Civil War, he worked deciphering messages for the intelligence services of the Second Spanish Republic, and served as head of technical services for both the Departamento Especial de Información del Estado (DEDIDE) and the Servicio de Información Militar (SIM). He was active at the Ebro front and in Tardienta. By then, he had already heard about the Enigma machine, as the Germans had provided units to the Condor Legion assisting the Nationalist forces. Camazón shared this information with the French intelligence service in exchange for counterintelligence useful to the Republic.

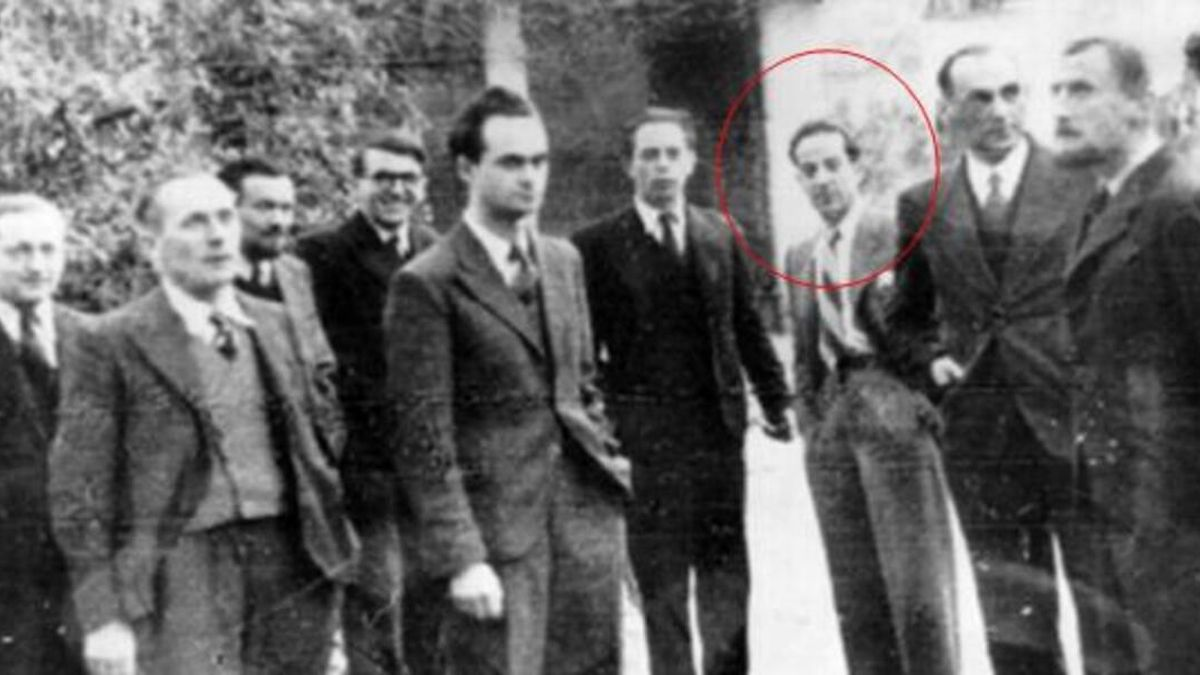
Alongside other colleagues, third from the right.

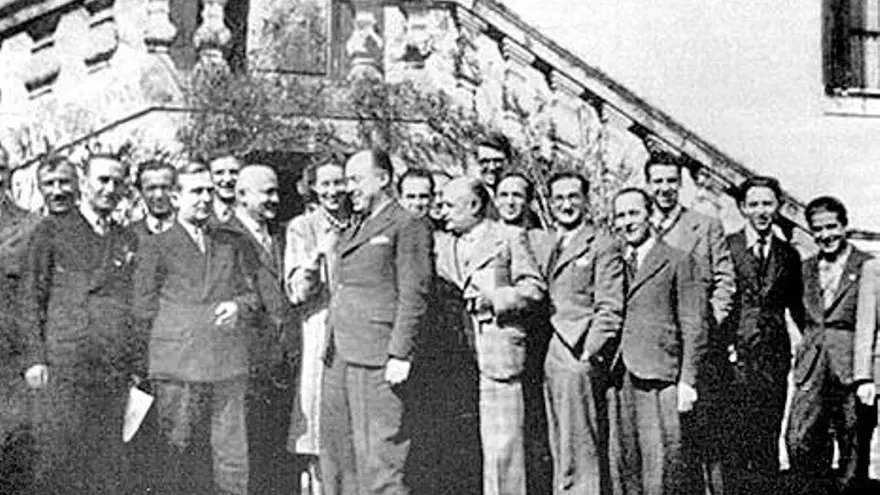
Group picture, third from the left.

After the war, he ended up in a French concentration camp, where he managed to smuggle out a letter to French intelligence, the Deuxième Bureau, headed by George Bertrand. The "Team D" was composed of seven Spanish exiles from the Republican secret service (five officers and two commissioners), and was led by Camazón. He became head of the Spanish team at PC Bruno (Poste de Commandement Bruno), which worked to break the cipher used by the Germans during World War II with the help of 15 Polish and 9 French cryptographers. The French secret service had been informed about the Polish advances against Enigma by cryptographers who had fled the invasion of Poland: Marian Rejewski, Jerzy Różycki, and Henryk Zygalski, who joined Bertrand's team alongside the French and Spanish cryptographers.

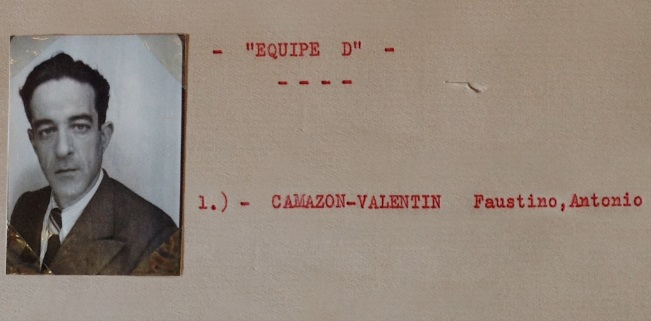
File in "Equipe D".

Bertrand regularized the legal status of these seven Spanish Republican exiles so they could join the secret facility at Bruno, located in the Château de Vignolles, northwest of Paris. However, this international cryptography team had to flee following the invasion of France after Philippe Pétain signed the armistice with Hitler in June 1940. Bruno was dismantled and the Polish, French, and Spanish cryptographers moved to the Cadix center at the Château des Fouzes near Uzès (Nîmes), and later to Algiers, where they operated under the cover of a fish warehouse until the Allies liberated the area in 1942. As German forces had prohibited air travel, the international team had to cross Spain in three planes. Camazón's plane suffered a breakdown and had to make an emergency landing in Madrid. He avoided arrest thanks to a false identity: André Magnol.

It took three years to break the Enigma cipher. Alan Turing developed the Bombe, an electro-mechanical computer based on a design by Marian Rejewski from 1938, at the Government Code and Cypher School in Bletchley Park, and later developed Colossus, an electronic computer. Camazón joined the American troops under Dwight D. Eisenhower and personally witnessed the liberation of several Nazi concentration camps.

After the war, Camazón returned to France and retired from the French secret services. He worked for the Deuxième Bureau at the Ministry of Foreign Affairs as an expert on Latin America and Spain. There, he learned that British and American intelligence services had thwarted several attempts to assassinate Francisco Franco. Two Americans visited him at his home in Paris, located near the Bois de Boulogne, and offered him a high-level position due to his wartime experience and because he was "not French". However, he declined the offer out of gratitude for what France had done for him and his colleagues. He eventually retired and was decorated.

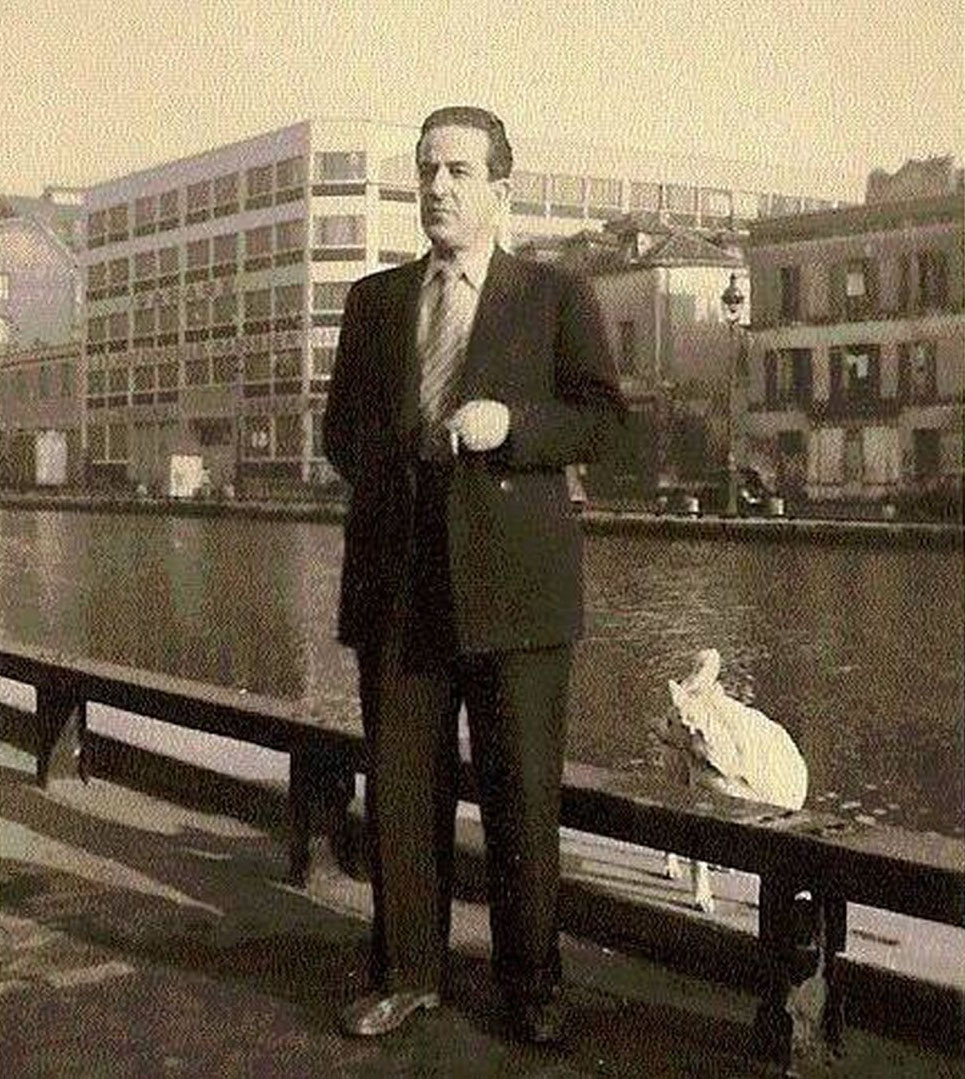
Portrait.

He returned to Spain in 1968 with the help of his brother-in-law, a canon, and spent his final years with his family—first in Pau, southern France, and later in Jaca, Spain, where he received many visitors and passed away.

== Legacy ==
Although he wrote his memoirs, the manuscript has not been found. His erudition was such that his family preserved a psychoanalytic study he dedicated to Miguel de Cervantes, which became a lecture he delivered at the Sorbonne in 1952. A documentary about his life, Equipo D: Los códigos olvidados, directed by Jorge Laplace, premiered in Valladolid, was shown at the Seville European Film Festival in 2019, and aired on La 2 of Radiotelevisión Española on 28 April 2021.

Camazón was married to María Cadena, a nurse from Huesca, whom he met in 1938. When he learned she had been denounced, he helped her flee to France by providing a false identity and a guide to cross the Pyrenees. They later reunited in Paris. He amassed a personal library of 800 books in 150 languages, which was acquired in 1984 by historian Guillermo Redondo for the María Moliner Library at the University of Zaragoza.
