= Chantal Gorostegui =

French cyclist

Personal information
- Born: 20 January 1965 (age 61) Prats-de-Mollo-la-Preste, France

Cycling career
- Sport: Cycling
- Role: Rider

Chantal Gorostegui (born 20 January 1965) is a former French racing cyclist. She won the French national road race title in 1994.
