= Arboretum de Saint Guillem =

Arboretum in Pyrénées-Orientales, France

Coordinates: 42°24′17″N 2°28′47″E

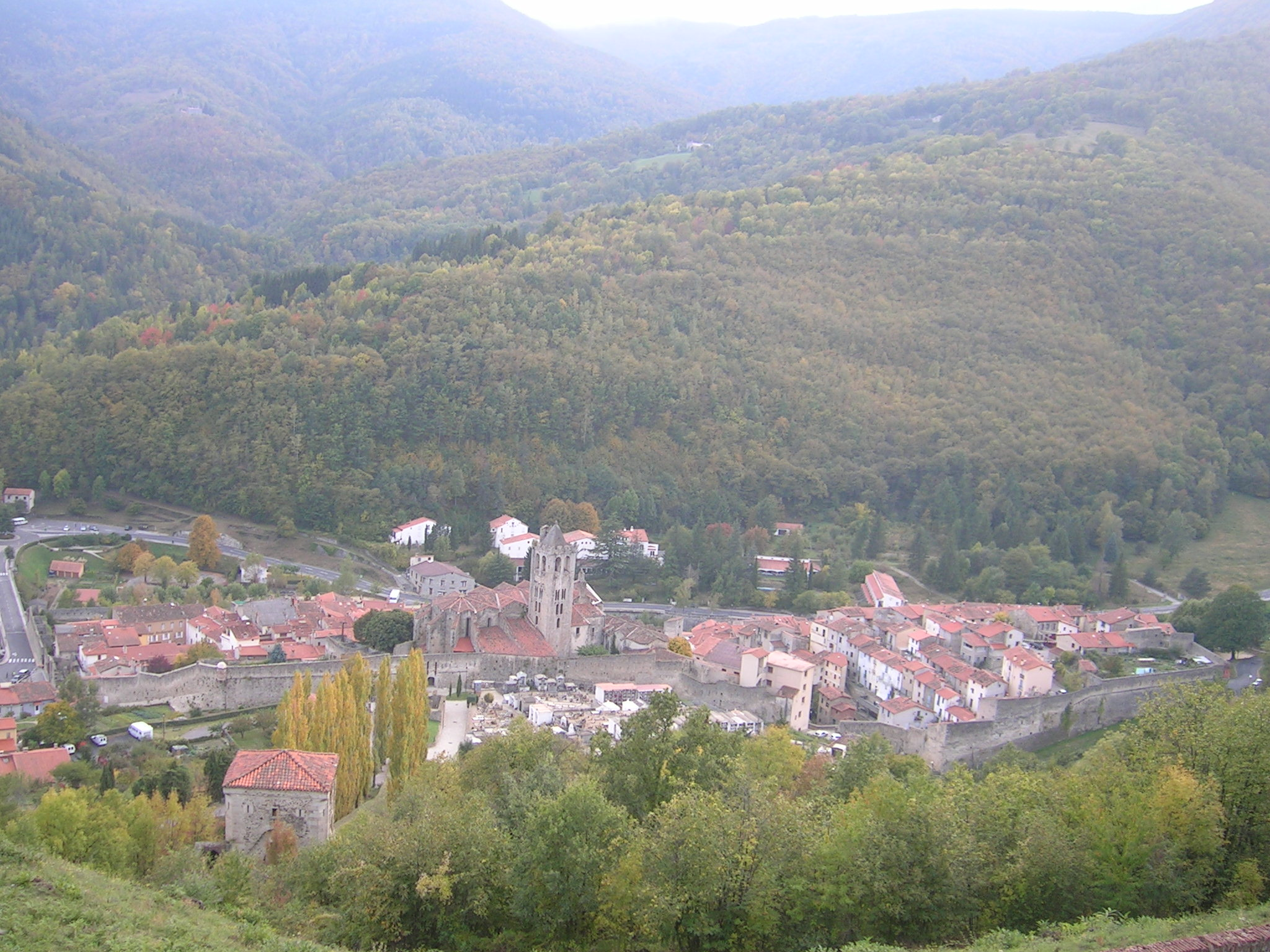

The Arboretum de Sant Guillem (Saint Guillaume in French, 8 hectares) is an arboretum located near the river Tech in Prats-de-Mollo-la-Preste (Pyrénées-Orientales, France). The arboretum was created in 1958 and contains about fifty varieties of conifers and deciduous trees, once a nursery for the Office National des Forêts but still well-marked, with hiking trails throughout.

== See also ==
- List of botanical gardens in France
