= Argelès-sur-Mer concentration camp =

French internment camp

Coordinates: 42.575°N 3.04528°E

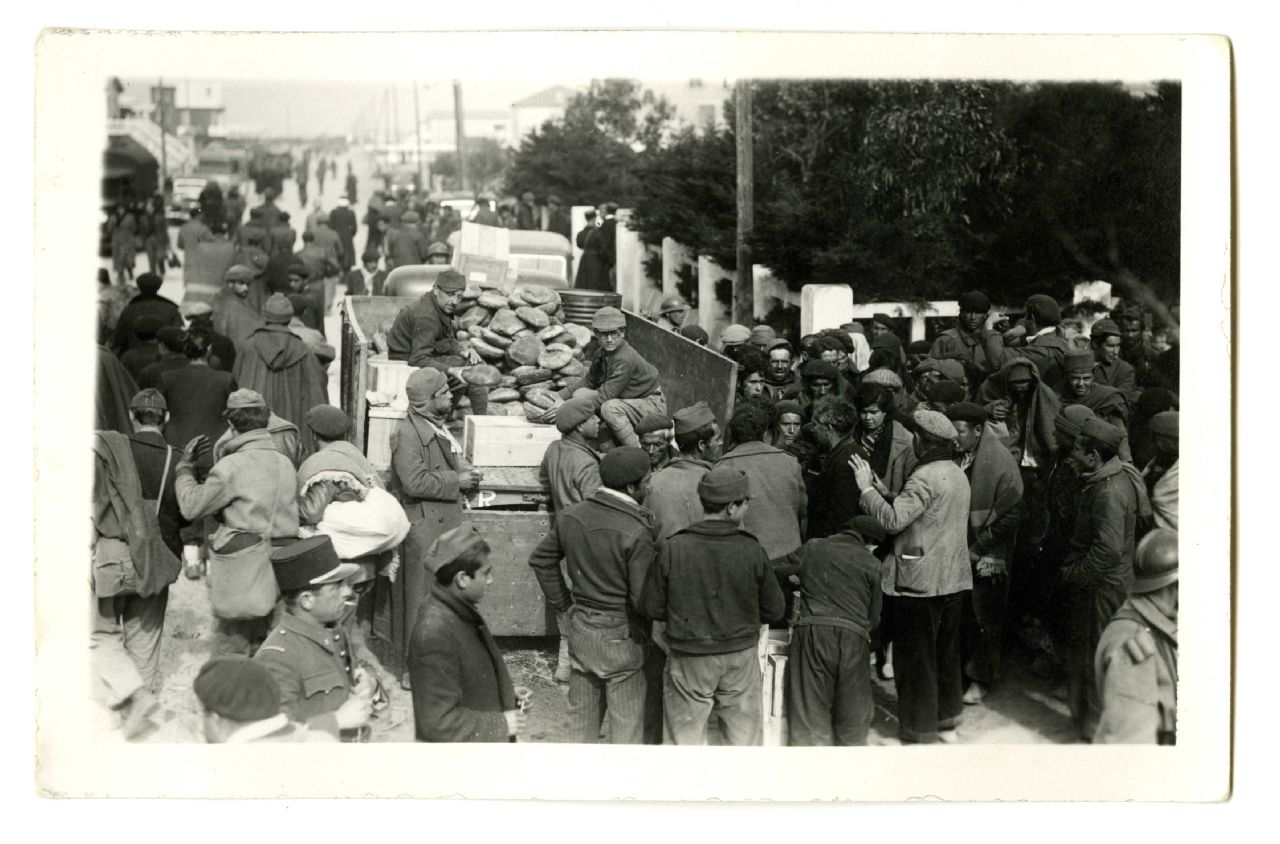
Refugees in the camp, 1939

The Argelers concentration camp was an internment camp established in early February 1939 on the territory of the French commune of Argelès-sur-Mer for Spanish Republican refugees. Called La Retirada (the withdrawal), many of the refugees were members of the Spanish Republican Army (Ejército Popular Republicano) in the northeast of Spain in the last months of the Spanish Civil War.

== Description ==
Last area under Republican control after the Fall of Catalonia in February 1939. French authorities would not allow Spanish Republican military units to be transferred to this zone after having entered France.

The camp was located near the Mediterranean coast at the foot of the northern side of the Albera Massif in Roussillon, 8 km north of the French-Spanish border.

The camp at Argelers received more than 100,000 Spanish men and women, of both civilian and military backgrounds. The latter were the remainder of the Eastern Region Army Group (GERO) that crossed the border following the Fall of Barcelona and the Retirada – the desperate withdrawal of long civilian and military columns towards the French border at the end of the Francoist Catalonia Offensive. All refugees were disarmed and arrested upon entering France.

Republican military leaders such as Modesto, commander of the 4th Division and Líster, commander of the 11th Division of the elite V Army Corps, had first seen the retreat to France of the remainder of the Ebro Army as part of a tactical evacuation, with the aim of regrouping these units with the remaining units of the last area under Republican control in order to continue the resistance. The French government, however, would not allow the Republican units that crossed the border to be transferred to the remaining Spanish Republican territory. All the veteran survivors of the 11th Division, together with all Republican military, were disarmed and swiftly interned in French concentration camps immediately after crossing its border.

The conditions were very poor in this concentration camp, there were no latrines, running water, huts or any kind of shelter, apart from holes in the ground dug by inmates. Food was thrown over the wire into the compound by French officials and Republican doctors were not allowed supplies or equipment. Diseases were prevalent. The guards would bring around petroleum baths to combat the infestations of fleas and lice. Efforts to encourage the refugees to return to Spain were common. The concentration camps were very large and poorly run. People died of hypothermia, disease, or despair. It was common to see dead bodies piled up and left in the open in areas throughout the camp.

The French government went on to found internment camps all along the northern foot of the Pyrenees to relieve the grim conditions at Argelès. Many refugees ended up confined in those camps, e.g. Gurs internment camp.

== Notable prisoners ==
- Marcel Langer, member of the international brigades, later in World War II a hero of the French Resistance in Toulouse, where he was guillotined on 23 July 1943
- Diego Camacho (pen name Abel Paz), Spanish writer and novelist
- Rubén Ruiz Ibárruri, son of Spanish Communist leader Dolores Ibárruri, La Pasionaria.
- Vicente Ferrer Moncho.
- Joaquim Amat-Piniella, Catalan writer.
- Peko Dapčević, Yugoslav partisan.
- Arthur Adamov (23 August 1908 – 15 March 1970), playwright, one of the foremost exponents of the Theatre of the Absurd.
- Andrés García La Calle, Commander of the fighter units of the Spanish Republican Air Force
- Josep Bartolí, Catalan artist
- Concha Pérez Collado

== Commemoration ==
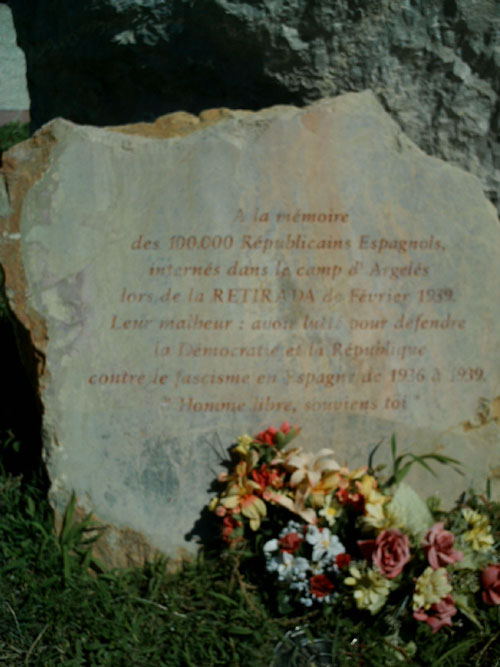
Commemorative monument for the survivors of the retirada (retreat).

Inscription on the commemorative monument on the northern beach of Argelès-sur-Mer:

A la mémoire des 100.000 Républicains Espagnols, internés dans le camp d'Argelès, lors de la RETIRADA de Février 1939. Leur malheur: avoir lutté pour défendre la Démocratie et la République contre le fascisme en Espagne de 1936 à 1939. Homme libre, souviens toi.

In memory of the 100.000 Spanish republicans, interned in the Camp of Argelès, during the RETIRADA in February 1939. Their disgrace: having fought for defending democracy and the republic against fascism in Spain from 1936 to 1939. Free Men, remember them.

(A la memoria de los 100.000 republicanos españoles, internados en el campo de Argelès, tras la RETIRADA de febrero de 1939. Su desgracia: haber luchado para defender la Democracia y la República contra el fascismo en España de 1936 a 1939. Hombre libre, acuérdate.)
