= Prats-de-Mollo-la-Preste =

Prats-de-Mollo-la-Preste Prats de Molló i la Presta
- Commune
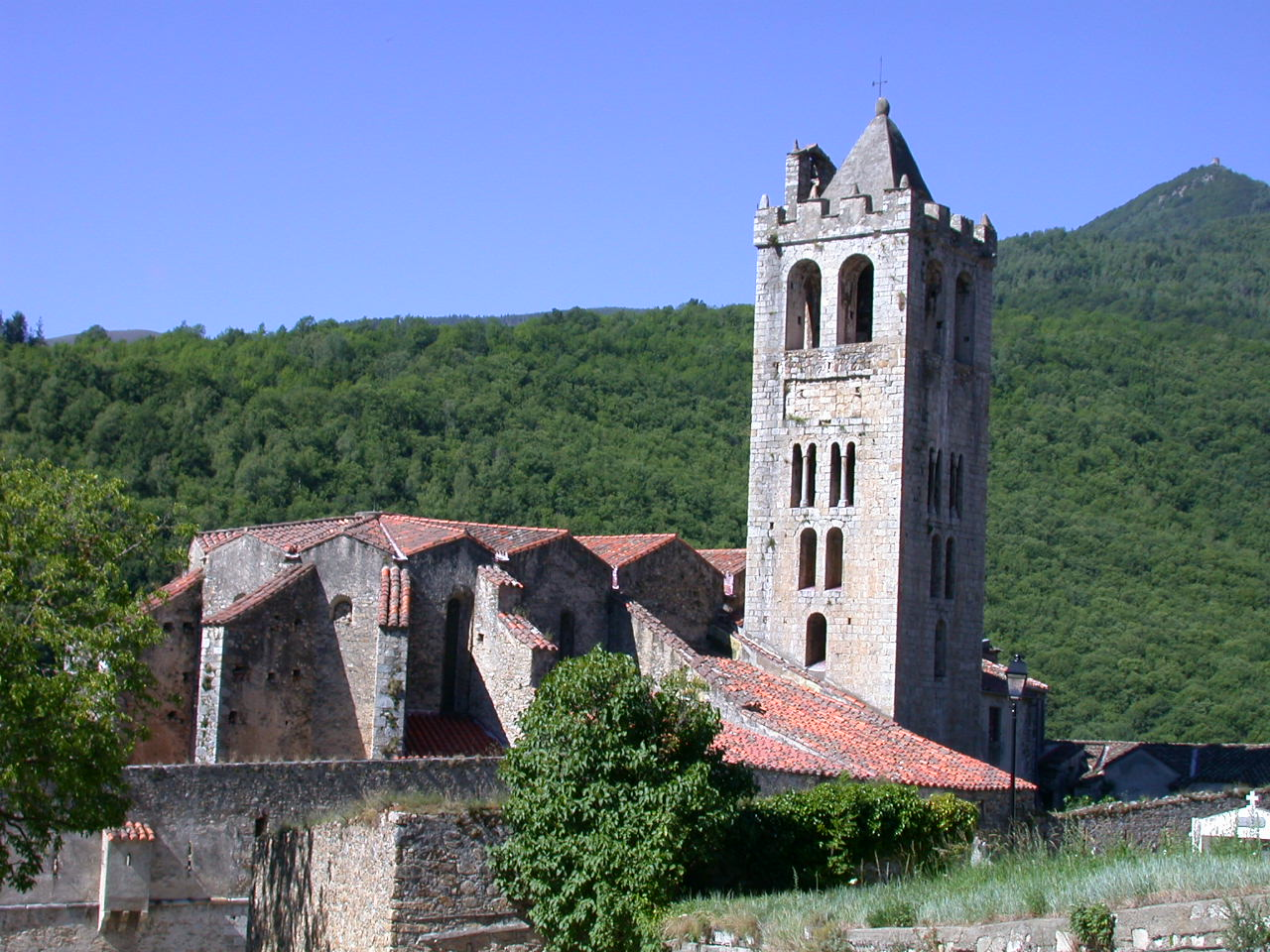
- The church of Saint-Juste-et-Sainte-Ruffine, in Prats-de-Mollo-la-Preste

- Coat of arms
- Location of Prats-de-Mollo-la-Preste
- Location within France Location within Occitanie
- Coordinates: 42°24′14″N 2°28′48″E
- Country: France
- Region: Occitania
- Department: Pyrénées-Orientales
- Arrondissement: Céret
- Canton: Le Canigou

Government
  - Mayor (2020–2026): Claude Ferrer
- Area^{1}: 145.09 km^{2} (56.02 sq mi)
- Elevation: 735 m (2,411 ft)
- Highest elevation: 2,693 m (8,835 ft)
- Lowest elevation: 575 m (1,886 ft)
- Population (2023): 1,099
  - Density: 7.575/km^{2} (19.62/sq mi)
- Time zone: UTC+01:00 (CET)
  - Summer (DST): UTC+02:00 (CEST)
- INSEE/Postal code: 66150 /66230
- ^{1} French Land Register data, which excludes lakes, ponds, glaciers > 1 km^{2} (0.386 sq mi or 247 acres) and river estuaries.

Prats-de-Mollo-la-Preste (French pronunciation: [pʁats də mɔjo la pʁɛst]; Catalan: Prats de Molló i la Presta) is a commune in the Pyrénées-Orientales department in southern France, near the border with Spain and the Autonomous Community of Catalonia. The name Prats-de-Mollo comes from Catalan "meadows of Molló". Molló is a town just across the border and the Col d'Ares. La Preste is a spa resort town that was a separate village but is now included as part of the municipality. Prats-de-Mollo-la-Preste was the capital of the eponymous former canton. It forms part of the historical comarca of Vallespir and is part of Northern Catalonia. It is a member of Les Plus Beaux Villages de France (The Most Beautiful Villages of France) Association.

== Geography ==
Prats-de-Mollo-la-Preste is located in the Pyrenees, 13 km (8.1 mi) from the Spanish border and the Autonomous Community of Catalonia, on the banks of the river Tech, and on the south face of the Canigó at an elevation of 735 meters.

Prats-de-Mollo-la-Preste is located in the canton of Le Canigou and in the arrondissement of Céret.

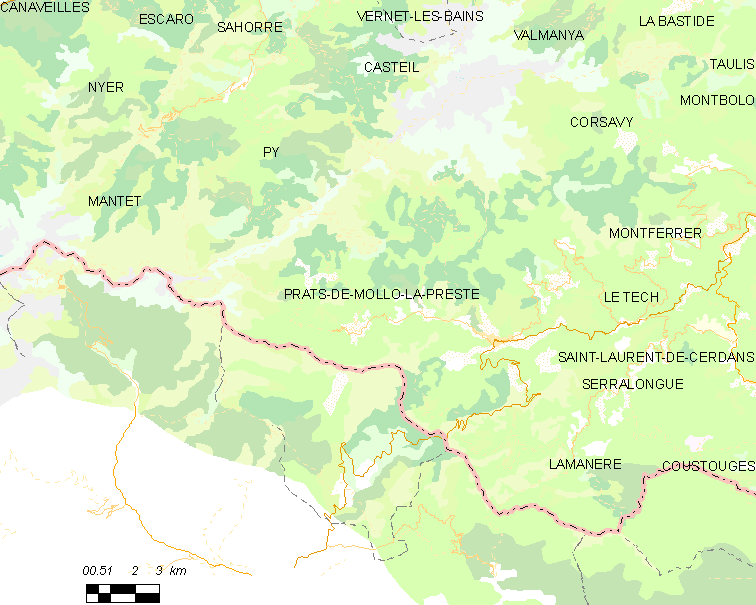
Map of Prats-de-Mollo-la-Preste and its surrounding communes

A commune of hills, mountains and deep valleys in the eastern Pyrenees

Pic de Costabonne, altitude 2467 metres, immediately to the west of La Preste.

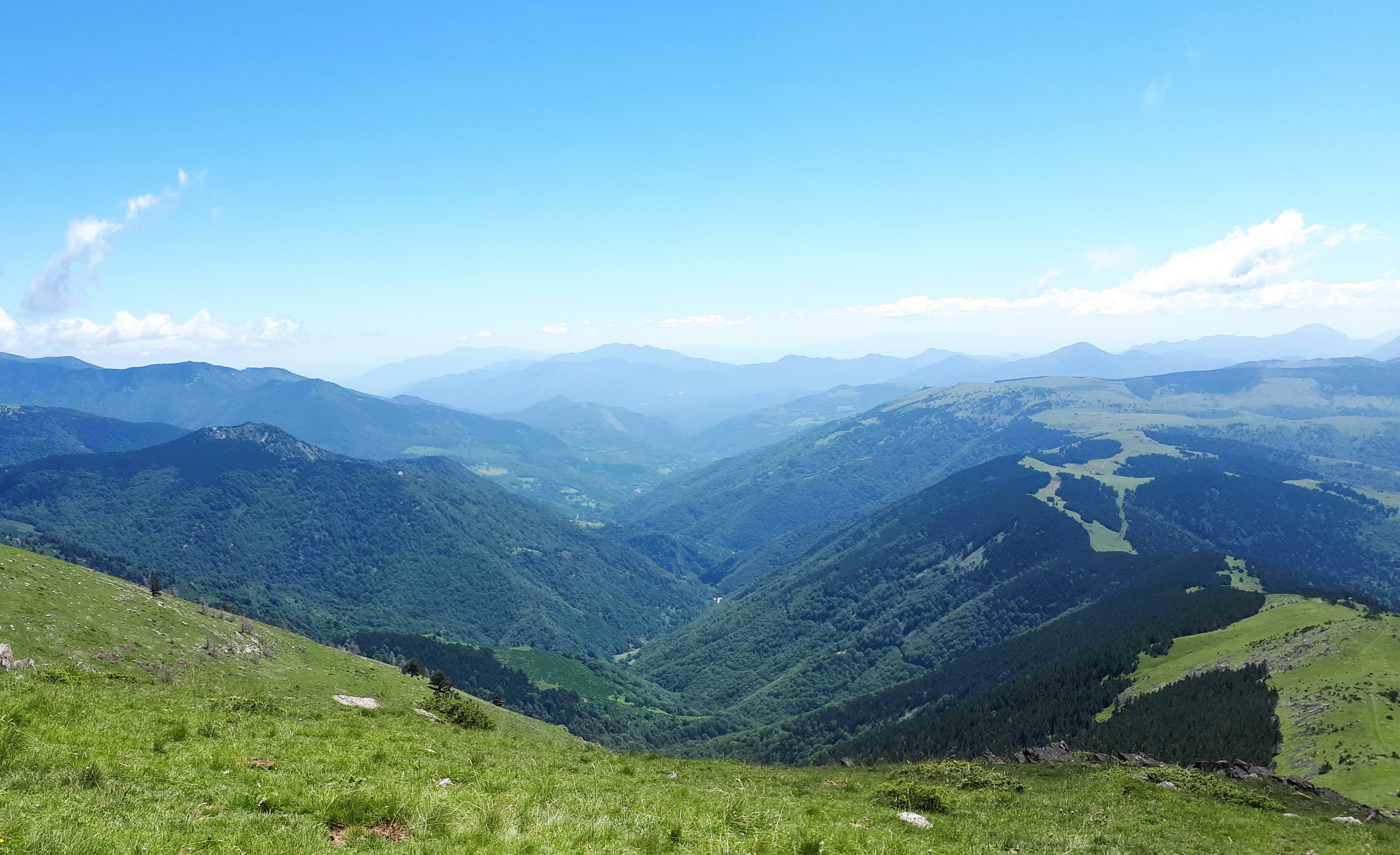
The upper Tech valley, as seen from the border with Spain (which lies to the right of the grassy ridge).

High ground above 2200 metres along the north-western boundary of the commune (which lies to the left).

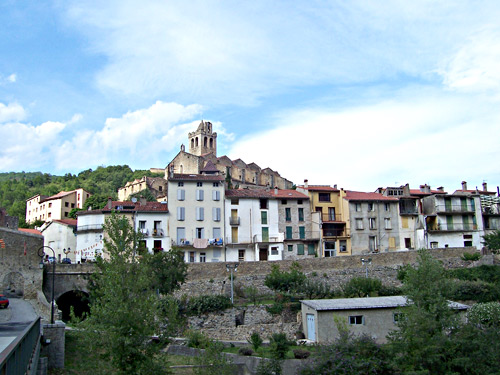
Panoramic view of the town

== History ==
The town, along with other Vallespir municipalities of Roussillon was separated from the rest of the Principality of Catalonia, and therefore from Spain, by the Treaty of the Pyrenees (1659), in which France got from Spain part of Catalonia. In 1926, the town was the scenario of the Plot of Prats de Molló, an attempted military liberation of Catalonia, then under the Spanish Dictatorship of Primo de Rivera, and to proclaim the Catalan Republic, planned by Estat Català and led by Francesc Macià, but aborted at the last moment by the French police.

During the Spanish Civil War it was the location of a refuge financed by the pacifist organisation War Resisters' International and run by Professor José Brocca. It was also the site of a concentration camp housing Republican refugees from Spain at the end of the Spanish Civil War. It was one of a number of initial sorting camps.

== Population and society ==
=== Population ===
Historical population
Year	Pop.	±% p.a.
1968	1,351	—
1975	1,190	−1.80%
1982	1,142	−0.59%
1990	1,102	−0.44%
1999	1,080	−0.22%
2007	1,144	+0.72%
2012	1,074	−1.25%
2017	1,163	+1.61%
2023	1,099	−0.94%
Source: INSEE

=== Festivals and traditions ===
Built on the banks of the river Tech, surrounded by mountains, Prats-de-Mollo-la-Preste was one of the most important border towns in the area, and today still boasts much evidence of its rich past, both architectural and traditional.

In February, two events traditionally take place at Prats: the Fête de l'ours (in Catalan: Festa de l'Ós, i.e. bear festival) and Carnaval. Both are full of fascinating traditions handed down over the years. During the Bear Festival, celebrated annually at the beginning of spring, the locals dress up as bears, covering themselves with soot or coal and oil, and "attacking" the onlookers, attempting to get everyone dirty. Others dress up as hunters, playing the role of "protectors". The festival ends with the "ball de l'os (bear dance). There is a reference to this tradition in the Catalan author Joan-Lluís Lluís' novel El dia de l'ós (The Day of the Bear).

One of the events during carnival week is the Ball de la Posta. The 'posta' is a plank 1.5 m long and 30 cm wide, with a picture of a pretty girl at one end, representing the Virgin, and a devil on the other side. Dancers range themselves in couples opposite the carrier of la posta and his colleague who carries a wooden sword. The dancers advance three times, in couples, towards the armed pair. The first time they bow, the second time the lady must kiss the face on the posta, choosing devil or virgin, and the third time she gets a smack on the bottom with the plank. In olden days, this dance was a judgement on vice and virtue.

== Sites of interest ==
This walled town is a maze of narrow cobbled streets and mediaeval architecture. With only 1,100 inhabitants, it boasts numerous hotels, restaurants and cafés, the narrow streets forming terraces linked together by stairways and passages. A covered walkway leads directly from the town to Fort Lagarde, an impressive fort built by Marshal Vauban in 1683 to strengthen the town's defences and keep the population under control after the Treaty of the Pyrenees (1659) divided Catalonia between Spain and France and after the revolts of the Angelets de la Terra (1667–75). Its position also makes it ideal as a starting point for walking and climbing itineraries. Only a few kilometres away lies La Preste, a spa town known for its waters and treatment of urinary infections and related diseases. In the 14th century, people with leprosy used to bathe in the 'Leper's pool' to help to relieve their symptoms.

The town hosts the 8 hectare Arboretum de Saint Guillem.

== Notable people ==
- Chantal Gorostegui (1965-), racing cyclist born in Prats-de-Mollo-la-Preste.

== See also ==
- Communes of the Pyrénées-Orientales department
