= Roesset =

Roesset, or Roësset, may refer to:

- Consuelo Gil Roësset (1905–1995), Spanish publisher
- María Roësset Mosquera (1882–1921), Spanish painter
- Margarita Gil Roësset (1908–1932), Spanish sculptor, illustrator
- Marisa Roësset Velasco (1904–1976), Spanish painter

== See also ==
- Rosetta (disambiguation)
- Gil (surname)
