= Matilde Calvo Rodero =

Matilde Calvo Rodero (Madrid, 1918)

Matilde Calvo Rodero (Madrid, 1899–1982) was a Spanish printmaker and bookbinder. She worked at the Museo Nacional de Artes Decorativas, and participated in several exhibits, winning multiple awards. Calvo was affiliated with the Lyceum Club Femenino and the Sapphic Circle of Madrid. Her sister, Pilar, was also an artist.

== Early life and education ==
Matilde Calvo Rodero was the daughter of Anunciación Rodero Domínguez and Gaspar Castor Calvo Rodero, assistant director of Tabacalera. The couple had six daughters and one son: Josefa, Carmen, Matilde, Rosalía, Isabel, Pilar, and Rafael. The sister, Pilar, was also an artist.

She studied at the Special School of Painting, Sculpture, and Engraving in Madrid, sharing classes with Rosa Chacel, Timoteo Pérez Rubio, and Victorina Durán, with whom she became close friends. She was known as "the dollar princess" because she helped her classmates who didn't have money for materials.

== Career ==
She worked at the National Museum of Industrial Arts, known as the Museo Nacional de Artes Decorativas, from 1927, alongside Durán and Francisco Pérez-Dolz, among others, in the early 1920s.

In 1920, Calvo participated in the First Salon d'Automne of Independent Artists founded by the Asociación Española de Pintores y Escultores (Spanish Association of Painters and Sculptors), which brought together 700 artists, 24 of whom were women. A year later, she exhibited at the Ateneo de Madrid, alongside Durán, who displayed batiks, pictorial studies, and etchings. She also exhibited etchings at the 1922 National Exhibition, where her work entitled Romantic Garden won an award.

In 1923, the Dirección General de Bellas Artes held a National Painting Competition related to the industrial arts, in which she was awarded 1,000 pesetas for a ceramic frieze project in the "Ceramics on flat surfaces, enamels and glass" section. In that competition, Pérez Dolz also won awards for her batiks, Durán for a carpet project, and Amparo Brime and Gloria Brime for their posters and theater figurines. Calvo Rodero participated in the International Exhibition of Modern Decorative and Industrial Arts held in Paris in 1925, obtaining a silver medal. She exhibited seven artistic leather bindings of the works Vita Nova, Manon Lescaut, The Lady of the Camellias, Tratado de técnica ornamental, La luna nueva, Hernán y Dorotea, and Salomé.

In 1926, she participated again in the National Exhibition of Fine Arts with a leather cover embossed with applications. That same year she exhibited etchings in its halls with Durán, among which critics highlighted "Fuente" for its interesting backlighting and the embossed and die-cut leather of its bindings with applications of wrought iron and stones. At the Lyceum, according to Durán in her memoirs, they shared a table in the tea room with Trudi Cra, wife of Luis Araquistáin, Isabel Espada, and Julia Iruretagoiena. Also among her friends was Elena Fortún.

In 1929, she won a prize in the National Decorative Art and Engraving Competition consisting of 1,000 pesetas for a bookbinding work.

Calvo participated again in the National Exhibition of Fine Arts in 1930 with book covers of leather, parchment and leather, embossed, pyrographed, painted or polychrome. In 1930, while still a teacher at the Escuela del Hogar y Profesional de la Mujer, she was granted a scholarship by the Junta para Ampliación de Estudios e Investigaciones Científicas (JAE) to perfect her bookbinding technique in Paris. She was granted a two-month scholarship, during which time she dedicated herself to preparing paperback books for binding, restoring torn pages, mounting and restoring engravings. This was followed by other jobs such as paper and leather binding; preparing the leather; the complete leather binding, mounted with ivory, silver, and other material applications on the leather binding, in addition to cases, gilding, and titles. She participated in the 1931 International Exhibition of Book Arts in Paris with her bindings. She again won an award from the Official Book Chamber of Madrid for some of her bindings in May 1936.

After the Civil War, Calvo continued exhibiting, and in 1946, she participated in the First Women's Fine Arts Salon, organized by the weekly Domingo and sponsored by the Dirección General de Bellas Artes. Other artists included Rosario de Velasco, Ángeles Santos Torroella, and Marisa Roësset Velasco. In 1948, Calvo continued working at the Escuela del Hogar y Profesional de la Mujer and was promoted with an annual salary or bonus of 6,000 pesetas.

== Personal life ==
Calvo and Durán were more than just friends. They lived together, traveled together, shared a studio on Ventura de Vega Street, and collaborated on projects. They were also members of Lyceum Club Femenino and the underground Sapphic Circle of Madrid a lesbian support network created by Durán.

== Death and legacy ==
Matilde Calvo Rodero died in Madrid, in 1982.

In November 2015, one of her bookbindings was named Piece of the Month at the Museo Nacional de Artes Decorativas.
