= Lesbians in the Spanish Second Republic =

History of lesbians in Spain

Lesbians in the Second Spanish Republic and Civil War period were doubly discriminated against, as a result of their gender and sexual practices. Prior to the Second Republic, lesbians in Spain were largely ignored, eclipsed by gay men. They faced discrimination as they challenged definitions around what it meant to be a woman. While homosexuality was not condemned by law, it was possible for lesbians to face more severe punishment when charged with violation of morals because of their sexual orientation.

During the Dictatorship of Primo de Rivera, the first modern laws specifically punishing homosexual acts came into force, though few cases ever came to court because gays and lesbians were considered by jurists to have mental illness. Lesbians also lived in a culture oriented around the Roman Catholic Church, which set gender norms and dictated laws which left women in general with few rights and little social capital. Where lesbians were more accepted, they tended to be stereotypes as either very masculine or overly feminine. Their social capital was at its strongest during this period in Madrid. A few prominent lesbians would rise in this period, though their lesbianism would not be known by wider society in many cases until many years later. These women included Marisa Roësset, Victoria Kent, Carmen de Burgos, Irene Polo, Carmen Conde, Matilde Ras and Elena Fortún who were all part of the Sapphic Circle of Madrid during the 1920s.

The Second Republic would usher in a period where women had more rights under the law, and where women were politically empowered for the first time. Homosexuality was also stripped from the penal code, though there were still ways for which lesbians could be charged, for example by being deemed dangerous to the state, or simply being detained by the state even if their behavior was not criminal. Prominent lesbians of this period included Lucía Sánchez Saornil, América Barroso, Margarita Xirgu, Irene Polo, Carmen de Burgos, María de Maeztu, Victoria Kent and Victoria Ocampo.

Lesbian women were often lumped alongside heterosexual women in the Civil War period, and blending in was often a survival technique. Homophobia and gender violence in Nationalist zones and rural parts of Spain made life dangerous for lesbians. Those who could went into exile. Some who could not often found themselves in prison.

The end of the war saw Francoist Spain reimpose strict Roman Catholic based gender norms and a return of women lacking legal autonomy. Women who did not adhere to expected gender norms, like lesbians, were at increased risk of punishment by the state. At the same time, the state largely could not understand lesbianism so the risk was less than that of their male counterparts. Women in exile faced a double burden of being lesbian and female. Some lesbians continued to be involved in the activism they had espoused in the Second Republic and the Civil War.

Historical memory has helped share stories of LGBT people during the Civil War. This can be problematic at times because the stories of many lesbians have been forgotten or never told in the first place. It makes it hard to remember lesbians if they have been erased from history.

== Prelude to the Second Republic (1800–1922) ==
=== Laws around homosexuality ===
Spain came into the twentieth century lacking laws about homosexuality, having only created its first penal code in the modern era in 1822. Inspired by the French Napoleonic Code of 1810, neither mentioned homosexuality as sodomy had been legal in France since 1791. While Spain's criminal codes were amended in 1848, 1859, and 1870, homosexuality was never mentioned as there were other ways, namely public scandal laws and laws against immorality, that could be used to prosecute it.

While the law made no distinctions between same-sex sexual activity and opposite-sex sexual activity, sexual offenses could still be prosecuted if resulting from a case about the violation of morals. Leniency in sentencing would be totally arbitrary and lesbians could find themselves more severely punished for violating societal gender roles.

=== Same-sex marriage ===
One of the first recorded same-sex marriages in Spain occurred on 8 June 1901, when Elisa Sánchez Loriga and Marcela Gracias Ibeas married after deceiving a Galician priest into performing the wedding ceremony. Repudiated by their family and having their deceit discovered by neighbors, the couple fled to Porto, Portugal where they were arrested. The pair would then flee to Argentina.

=== LGBT culture ===
Following the end of the First Republic in 1874, the Bourbon monarchy was restored in Spain along with its conservative brand of Roman Catholicism. Despite this, LGBT culture primarily focused around gay men began to develop in Madrid and Barcelona without huge opposition from Alfonso XIII.

This period represented a shift in Spain, where non-sexual lesbian love between women went from something of an idealized part of the cultural imagination of the closeness between women to that of a pervert with mental illness. These ideas were often internalized by lesbians of the period, with many feeling tortured and unhappy as it was difficult for them to live openly. There was no culture for lesbians to draw from, with no historical role models or body of literature for women to identify with. Society often blamed parents for their daughters being lesbians, accusing them of providing a bad education which resulted in them becoming homosexuals.

Some lesbians who were discovered in this period were forced to undergo conversion therapy, voluntarily submitting to it because they viewed themselves as defective and sick in the head. The creation by Freud of psychoanalysis encouraged many to believe that the method could be used to cure homosexuality. These cures often involved chemical and surgical approaches, with hormone treatments first which were then followed by drugs designed to remove a women's sexual libido. If this failed, women would be subjected to aversion therapy, which sometimes included shock therapy. If a woman still had homosexual thoughts, surgical treatments would be undertaken, including removal of the uterus or ovaries. In a few cases, lobotomies were also performed. To avoid this, many lesbians just went into deep denial.

The most well known LGBT figures in pre-Second Republic Spain were gay men. These included Emilio Castelar, José Lázaro Galdiano, Álvaro Retana, Miguel de Molina, Federico García Lorca, Luis Cernuda and Alfonso Hernández Catá. On the literary scene, there were few lesbians. Lesbian writers in this period were often erased in multiple ways as part of a broader issue of women's erasure in society. They were often forced to use male pen names to be published or had to remove female characters from stories. Lucía Sánchez Saornil began writing about lesbians in 1919. Her writing was characterized by an ultramodern avant-garde aesthetic. In discussing lesbianism, her work demonstrated that Spanish society was backward in its thinking and out of touch with the rest of Europe.

=== Societal views of lesbians ===
A manual published in 1908 described a lesbian as "an active, courageous, creative type, of fairly determined temperament, not too emotional; lover of life outdoors, science, politics or even business; good organizer and pleased with positions of responsibility .... Her body is perfectly feminine, although her inner nature is largely masculine."

Lesbians were also described in another sexology publication in that period as "congenital inverts". A third described them as "pseudoinvestidas", suggesting they would have been heterosexuals had they not been lured into inversion by others. Another espoused that lesbians could not be women, because women exist only as binaries, coupled with men for the purpose of reproduction.

== Dictatorship of Primo de Rivera (1923–1930) ==
=== Laws around homosexuality ===
The first laws criminalizing homosexuality appeared in Spain in the 1928 Penal Code. Implemented for a four-year period that ended in 1932, the law applied to both sexes, and came out of Miguel Primo de Rivera's disgust towards homosexuals in the Spanish military. Primo de Rivera justified these laws by calling back to an earlier time, when Catholic Monarchs ran Spain and the Roman Catholic Church persecuted homosexuals. Article 601 resulted in two to twelve years in prison for people engaging in dishonest abuses of people of the same sex. Article 616 stipulated, "Those who routinely or with scandal, commit acts contrary to modesty with persons of the same sex, will be punished with a fine of 1,000 to 10,000 pesetas and special disqualification for public office from six to twelve years." (Spanish: Artículo 616. El que, habitualmente o con escándalo, cometiere actos contrarios al pudor con personas del mismo sexo, será castigadio con multa de 1.000 a 10.000 pésetas e inhabilitación especial pará cargos públicos de seis a doce años.) Homosexuality itself was not illegal, but rather same-sex sexual acts were. Few prosecutions were ever brought to trial because jurists, influenced by medical scholars like Gregorio Marañón, believed homosexuals were sick in the head.

=== Lesbian culture ===
In the 1920s, Spain was very Catholic in terms of cultural orientation. Women in general during this period faced many types of social discrimination, and had few rights. They were wards of their male family members, could be forced into marriage and could not divorce.

The Dictatorship of Primo de Rivera occurred during a period where Spanish women were influenced by Anglo-Saxon flappers and the French garçonnes, who helped redefine Spanish womanhood, femininity and masculinity. Set against an international backdrop of return to normalcy and previous gender roles following World War I, it combined femininity with sensuality. There were two stereotypes of Spanish lesbians during the 1920s: butch lesbians who had mannish manners, and flappers. Butch lesbians at this time were characterized by their cigar smoking and consumption of wine and spirits. They imitated men. Lesbian flappers imitated Carlota, from the novel Sab. These were European women, who found freedom through work outside the household. In Madrid, these women had considerable cultural capital, and were portrayed as being almost Grecian in appearance, without any degeneration associated with them.

For some men in the Primo de Rivera period, there was no separation between feminism and lesbianism; the two were easily confused by many men including Gregorio Marañón. Gregorio Marañón saw lesbianism as a result of women eschewing traditional feminism, and instead taking up more masculine pursuits like sports.

=== Prominent lesbians ===
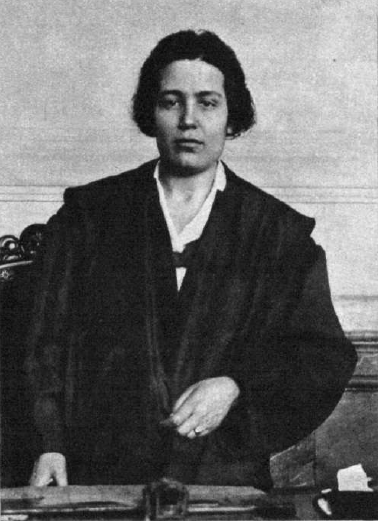
Spanish lawyer and Congressperson Victoria Kent during her time as Director General of Prisons in 1931

Marisa Roësset, Victoria Kent, Carmen de Burgos, Irene Polo, Carmen Conde, Matilde Ras and Elena Fortún were all part of a lesbian circle in Madrid during the 1920s. Lesbians in the late 1920s faced a number of challenges. People viewed them as having a mental illness, and being inverted.

A prominent lesbian of this period was Victoria Kent, one of three women elected to the first Congreso de Diputados in the Second Republic. In 1924, she made history when she became the first woman to join the Colegio de Abogados de Madrid and become a lawyer. In 1926, she was appointed vice president of Lyceum Club Femenino in Madrid. Like others, her lesbian status would not be well known until after the Civil War.

Elena Fortún was another prominent lesbian of the era, known for her vividly written children's stories. She had an unhappy childhood and never managed to fit in. She felt disgust at the idea of binding herself to a man for life. From a young age, she always wanted self-determination. Despite this, she did marry a cousin in 1908 and it was her husband who encouraged her to take up writing. The couple had two children.

== Second Spanish Republic (1931–1937) ==
=== Laws around women and homosexuality ===
Until the start of the Second Republic, women in general had few rights under the law. Things changed, with the introduction of laws that would empower women more generally in this period. They included the ability to run for political office, to vote, and to be able to get divorces.

In 1931, Article 616 was repealed when the new Spanish constitution came into force with the birth of the Second Republic. Within a few years, the Spanish Criminal Code in the Second Republic no longer included any mention of homosexuality. While this was not comparable to equality for women promised under law, it marked a major step forward in advancing nascent rights for the LGBT community in the country. Liberalization in laws would also not bring things like marriage equality.

Radical Socialist Party member Victoria Kent and PSOE member Luis Jiménez de Asúa pushed for reforms of the 1932 Penal Code. This reform saw the elimination of homosexuality as an aggravating factor in crime. Jiménez de Asúa also successfully lobbied for the inclusion of "estado peligroso" into Spanish criminal law for the first time. This law allowed the state to intervene after a crime had been committed or to prevent potential crimes being committed if they thought a potentially dangerous situation was going to occur. This was followed up by "defensa social", which allowed the state to act in defense of protecting society from people it considered dangerous, even if their behavior was not considered criminal in and of itself.

The 1933, the Ley de Vagos y Maleantes removed homosexuality as a crime from the books, except among members of the military. Beggars, ruffians, pimps and prostitutes were still considered criminals. Passing on 4 August 1933, it was approved unanimously in the PSOE and Communist dominated Congreso de Diputados.

=== Lesbian and gay culture ===
The Second Republic ushered in a period where people would accuse their political enemies of being homosexual. Unlike in some countries like Germany, the Second Republic period never saw any movement to try to end homophobia. Despite a liberalization in laws, culturally homosexuality was still considered a disease. Lesbians would still face broader discrimination as a result of their gender, which would leave them at risk of patriarchal male culture and gender-based violence. For the LGBT community more generally, the Second Republic started a period of distinct culture and broader LGBT intellectualism. Some women's homoerotic literature was shared during the Second Republic, with much of it linked to leftist writings, which were associated with feminist and free love movements.

=== Prominent lesbians ===
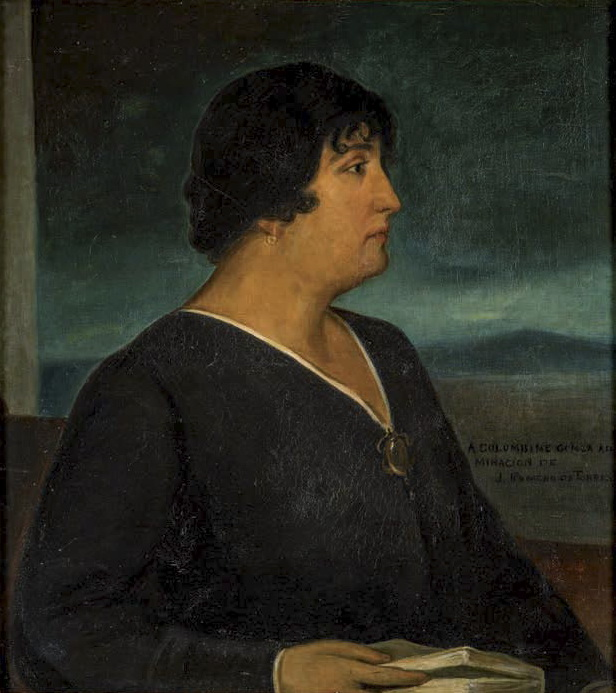
Portrait of Carmen de Burgos by Julio Romero de Torres in 1917

One of the most prominent lesbians of this period was Lucía Sánchez Saornil, a Confederación Nacional del Trabajo (CNT) member and founder of Mujeres Libres. She denounced her contemporaries for supporting the current patriarchal paradigm. Later, she started working for the newspaper Umbral, where she met her partner América Barroso in 1937. Sánchez Saornil argued in this period that motherhood was just one option available for women, and that women should first and foremost be autonomous individuals. Rather than her anarchist ideology, her own experiences as a lesbian probably informed her views about motherhood. Her lesbian status would not be well known until the 1980s, though she wrote using a male pen name in the Second Republic period, where she defended lesbian desire. Those who worked with her at Mujeres Libres in this period have said that Sánchez never hid she was a lesbian from them, and that her non-normative relationship with América Barroso was well known.

Margarita Xirgu was a well known Catalan stage actress during the Second Republic who was known in the theater community as an out lesbian. She performed in many plays written by her openly homosexual friend Federico García Lorca, including Yerma, Blood Wedding, and Doña Rosita. At the premiere of Yerma in Madrid, right-wing supporters in attendance interrupted the show to accuse her from their seats in the upper gallery of being a lesbian and a queer. She left Spain in January 1936 for an overseas tour, where she performed a number of Lorca's plays. She was met by appreciative audiences in Mexico that year.

It has been said that to understand everything is to forgive everything, I say we must forgive (if we are able to use that word in something that does not affect us) to what we do not understand, everyone lives well without the pain that we conceive of. It's a matter of habit, of temperament, let's not get transcendental.

– Carmen de Burgos regarding the lesbianism she saw everyday and which society did not tolerate

Irene Polo was another Catalan lesbian, who was also a self-taught journalist and out to those in the newsroom. In her youth, she was known to bathe naked at Port de la Selva on the Costa Brava with the goal of attracting other women. Meeting Margarita Xirgu in Barcelona in January 1936 for an interview after the performance of Doña Rosita, she left her position and followed the theater group to Mexico. Her abrupt decision to move resulted from her love for Margarita Xirgu. The pair would split a few years later as the relationship was largely a one-sided affair. Neither Margarita Xirgu nor Irene Polo would return to Spain. Polo committed suicide in Chile in 1941 by jumping out of a window.

Carmen de Burgos was a prominent lesbian during the time of the Second Republic. The first professional woman journalist in the country, her open lesbianism was tolerated as a decadent vice. A number of her works had the theme of lesbianism running through them. She was linked romantically to fellow feminist and Portuguese suffragette Ana de Castro Osório.

María de Maeztu, Victoria Kent and Victoria Ocampo spent time living at the Residencia de Señoritas in Madrid during 1931. The residence allowed women to openly discuss their radical beliefs, including the concept of free love and prison reform. In the early 1930s, María de Maeztu had an intense interest in Victoria Ocampo and was jealous of Victoria Kent. In 1931, Victoria Kent became the General Director of Prisons (Spanish: Dirección General de Prisiones), the first woman to get a high ranking political appointment in the Second Republic.

== Spanish Civil War (1936–1939) ==
Little is known about lesbians during the Spanish Civil War, as they largely disappeared from history and their stories were bundled generally without lesbian context alongside heterosexual women. Homophobia was present in rural areas and inside Republican and National armies. It was less present in Republican-controlled cities. During the war, many LGBT people went into hiding for their own protection as those who were out or suspected of being homosexual were often hunted down by local authorities. Being a lesbian in the Civil War period could make women a subject of violence, as her existence challenged societal regulations about the roles of women. Safety for women meant complying with hegemonic Spanish culture.

Huelva was taken by Nationalist forces on 29 July 1936, with full control of the province taking place by September 1936. During the Civil War, gay men and lesbian women behind Nationalist lines were often sent to Prisión Provincial de Huelva, one of the two most notorious prisons in Spain at the time. There, they were tortured and received particularly harsh punishment. Some lesbians there may have been misidentified as merely women who defied social conventions about the role of women. Aware of outside perceptions of them, women and lesbians in prison did not perpetuate a cycle of sexual violence against others behind bars with them.

=== Prominent lesbians ===
During the Civil War, Kent initially assisted by procuring supplies for Republicans in Guadarrama and later by assisting child refugees fleeing Spain. Soon, she was appointed as the First Secretary at the Republican Embassy in Paris, where she continued her work in trying to secure passage for Spanish refugee children, attempting to get them into the United States.

== Francoist Spain (1938–1975) ==
=== Laws around women and homosexuality ===
In the immediate post War period, the government's primary concern was removing political and armed resistance. LGBT people were not and would not be a major focus until they had eliminated these threats, and were able to force a form of conservative Catholicism on the populace. More pressing issues for lesbians included a return to a reduced legal status. The repeal of the law allowing divorce occurred on 23 September 1939, and severely restricted ways which in women, including gender non-conforming lesbians, could behave outside their homes by placing legal and cultural constraints on them.

The 1932 Penal Code with its concepts of "estado peligroso" and "defensa social" were re-purposed by Franco in 1954 to criminalize homosexuality as a sex crime. The 1933 Ley de Vagos y Maleantes was used by the Franco regime until 1970 to criminally punish homosexuals. Its constitutional replacement was Ley de Peligrosidad Social, which labeled homosexuality as a mental illness. These laws would later be used to imprison women and to commit them to mental institutions. Lesbians in Francoist prisons were charged with prostitution instead of homosexuality, which makes it impossible to determine their numbers when compared to gay men. This was because the regime had only two categories for women's employment: housewife and prostitute. Despite this, the Franco regime largely could not comprehend lesbian activism, and the number of prosecutions of women was always much lower than those for gay men, especially in the later years of the regime.

Lesbians who did find themselves in prison were often easy blackmail targets for guards. This was because a number of lesbians had sex behind bars for non-political prisoners. Some of these relationships were non-consensual as female guards might use their power to force other women to have sex with them and rape them.

=== In exile ===
Carmen Conde, Victorina Durán, Margarita Xirgu, Ana María Sagi, Irene Polo, and Lucía Sánchez Saornil survived the war as Spain's most famous lesbians, but all were required to go into exile for their own survival. While relatively open about their orientation in exile, they all tried to maintain levels of discretion about it. Lucía Sánchez Saornil went into exile at the end of the Civil War, facing three disadvantages: being a woman, a writer and a lesbian.

During the 1950s, 62-year-old Victoria Kent became involved with New York philanthropist Louise Crane, who was 15 years her junior, while living in exile. Starting in 1954, the couple published Ibérica: por la Libertad. The magazine was one of the most important publications among Spanish moderates living in exile. It only closed in 1974. It served to pressure the US Government to end its ties to Franco, even as the US sought to strengthen to combat the perceived communist threat.

=== Lesbian culture ===
Because of the Franco regime's beliefs about women, including an inability to understand lesbianism, there was some underground culture available for lesbian women. Where multiple men using public urinals was suspect, girls having parties without boys in attendance was viewed less circumspectly as it was assumed by many that they were being pure by not inviting boys. Their invisibility protected lesbians in ways that it did not protect men because many people believed lesbianism did not exist. Lesbians would often use code words, such as librarian, to identify one another. Because beaches were gender segregated, it was often an easy place for lesbians to socialize.

A Spanish literary tradition for lesbians would not start until the end of Francoism. The most significant piece of Spanish lesbian literature in this period was Oculto sendero by Elena Fortún, which while never officially published was circulating by 1945 and told the fictionalized account of a Spanish lesbian in exile.

The first lesbian organization in Spain would not be founded until 1979 in Barcelona, and lesbians would continue to maintain a lower profile in the LGBT community in Spain than their gay male peers. When not maintaining a lower profile, they were actively ignored by their male peers as completely unimportant.

== Historical memory ==
The Association for the Recovery of Historical Memory was founded in 2000 by Spanish journalist Emilio Silva after he successfully located the remains of his grandfather and eleven others in a roadside ditch. Starting in 2002, he began lobbying for historical memory to become law, which it did in 2007 with the support of the Zapatero government as La Ley de Memoria Histórica. It did not overturn Law 46/1977 and Pacto de Olvido that provided amnesty for members of the Franco regime. By law, victims existed but perpetrators did not.

One aspect of historical memory has involved identifying the bones of LGBT people killed during the Civil War. This is questioned by some, who do not understand how finding and identifying the bones of Francoist victims will assist Spaniards in resolving their complicated past. For many families of LGBT people, identifying remains is important because it is all they have of their family member. They do not have any larger legacy.

Lesbian stories are harder to find as gay men had much more visibility as a result of more brutal punishment by the Franco regime. Lesbians, benefiting from lower visibility as a means to avoid repression, have a much harder history to document in the Civil War period. According to documentary film maker Andrea Weiss, historical memory requires people first know stories about people before they can be remembered. While broad strokes are known, many of the individual stories are lost or forgotten so they cannot be remembered. It makes it impossible to understand the level of suffering endured by Spain's LGBT community during the Civil War.
