= Prostitution in Francoist Spain =

Prostitution in Francoist Spain (1936–1975) presented the government with a problem. The Nationalist faction in the Spanish Civil War (1936–1939) tolerated the practice, but prostitution was actively opposed by the Catholic Church. During the 1940s, state policy was more tolerant of it, and allowed officially sanctioned brothels to serve the "needs" of men and prevent the spread of sexually transmitted infections (STIs). However, clandestine prostitution was actively suppressed, while its economic causes, which largely involved war orphans and women in dire economic situations, were ignored.

In 1956, the tolerance of prostitution that had been shown by the government of Francoist Spain largely ended, as a result of a number of factors, including the joining of international bodies dedicated to stopping the human trafficking of women. Following the death of Francisco Franco in 1975, prostitutes were one of several groups of women that feminists sought to gain amnesty for.

== Background ==
Accusations of prostitution have been used as slanders against women as a form of disempowerment dating back to the Christian Bible. Accusations of being a prostitute have also been used to define who is a "good woman" and who is a "bad woman." False accusations would also be made to discredit social and political opponents.

=== Fascism and prostitution ===
Fascism sometimes supported regulated prostitution. Opposition to prostitution was much more frequent, often because of a belief that legalization of prostitution would result in a surge of men getting sexually transmitted diseases. In other cases, it was opposed as a violation of religious beliefs. Many fascists in this early period believed that women were defined around reproduction. Thus, the greatest opposition to prostitution often involved a belief that prostitution represented a deep moral and racial crisis. Fascists would slander political enemies of being or supporting prostitutes, as demonstrated through the spread of venereal disease which hurt a country on the whole. Jews in multiple countries would be accused of supporting prostitution.

=== Battle for women's identities ===
The state set up a battle between women, by encouraging women to define themselves as mothers and state patriots or as prostitutes who opposed to the state. It was supposed by Pope Pius XII's 1951 direction on the purpose of Christian marriage, which said, "In accordance with the Creator's will, matrimony, as an institution of nature, has not as a primary and intimate end the personal perfection of the married couple but rather the procreation and upbringing of new life. ... One of the fundamental demands of the true moral order is the sincere acceptance of motherhood's function and duties." In the case of Spain, the Franco regime's imperative view was motherhood should only ever occur in the context of marriage.

== Legality and practice ==
Prostitution, and how to combat it, was a problem for the Franco regime, given its historical acceptance and Catholic views opposing it. A zealous system of monitoring public morality was created to combat it. The 1935 decree banning prohibition was overturned in 1941, when the regime made prostitution legal, with the purpose of providing economic relief for women and combating sexually transmitted diseases among men. Prostitution was no longer viewed as a problem, but the immorality of prostitutes themselves was. The Patronato de Protección de la Mujer was created in 1941, with the goal of eliminating prostitution. Aligned with Roman Catholic interests, it served as an arm of the regime, seeking to monitor prostitutes and to rehabilitate these women, to bring them into line with Spanish definitions of womanhood. The organization was presided over by Carmen Polo, Franco's wife. Their rehabilitation efforts were often done at asylums, like Ciempozuelos, or prisons, like Calzada de Oropesa, Toledo. According to Paul Preston, "The increase in prostitution both benefited Francoist men who thereby slaked their lust and also re-assured them that 'red' women were a fount of dirt and corruption". The Patronato de Protección de la Mujer created numerous reports on prostitution in the years after its founding. The two most important reports were published in 1943 and 1944.

Prostitution was tolerated by the Catholic church during parts of the Franco period, as it was seen as a way to provide marital harmony by giving men a relief valve. It was also a way of continuing to control female sexuality, and reinforcing Catholic concepts of male dominion over women.

Several types of prostitution existed in the 1940s. This included public prostitution organized by regulated establishments run by pimps or businessmen, and private prostitution organized by sex workers without the involvement of third parties both within and outside state exercised control. The regime was less concerned with regulated places of prostitution, and more concerned with clandestine prostitution. Street prostitutes were vulnerable to law enforcement official efforts to clean up prostitution, and put these women in prisons or reform institutions. Authorities justified these efforts by saying they were trying to prevent the spread of venereal disease. These women would be taken to prisons and reformatory institutions that "were the correct scientific response to the problem of prostitution from the psychological and pedagogical points of view". Still, many women had no choice but to become street prostitutes, because their economic situation was so dire.

During the 1940s, prostitution was described as causing a number of other social ills, including abortions, infanticide, and the corruption of minors. Parque de Mendigos de los Mataderos area of Madrid was a particularly grim place for women and children to live in the 1940s. The zone was still feeling the effects of the Spanish Civil War, and had not recovered. Women with no other resources in that area turned to prostitution as a form of survival. A 1943 Patronato de Protección de la Mujer report from the found that, "There is notorious debauchery in the upper class of society; there are many Amancebamientos and children without a known father. Relaxation has reached such extreme, that sexual illicit relationships "almost dress well" in all spheres social, immoralities are recorded among the family members themselves, with sometimes the most serious and disgusting."

The government of the 1940s largely only recognized prostitution as a societal problem effecting cities, showing a lack of understanding of the economic situation in rural areas. In 1940, there were 1,144 registered prostitutes and 1,140 clandestine prostitutes in Barcelona. There were 1,050 registers and 700 clandestine prostitutes in Valencia. There were 850 clandestine prostitutes in Málaga. Per 1,000 people, Jaén, Palma de Mallorca, Ourense, Cádiz, and Málaga had the largest number of prostitutes. Huelva had 39 drinking houses and dance halls where men could engage prostitutes in 1942. The regime tolerated these so long as they did not openly advertise that these were little more than brothels. As a percentage of the population, smaller cities and major towns often had larger prostitute populations than bigger cities.

Prostitution was quite common in the province of Zaragoza in the 1940s, and was tolerated by the local government. Despite this, prostitutes were often charged with the corruption of minors and with having abortions, most of whom were minors themselves. During the 1940s, Luna represented an extreme case as 10 were found guilty of having abortions, in what appeared to be a co-ordinated effort to hide the existence of an under-age prostitution ring. Most of the girls were unable to sign their own names when brought in by the Guardia Civil.

Women could, and did, go to prison for being prostitutes. During the 1940s, in Almería, 20.45% of female prisoners were there for sexual offenses that mostly included prostitution. This compared to 9% of female prisoners being there because they had abortions, had committed infanticide or abandoned their children, and 4.9% who were in prison for crimes against authority. The remaining prisoners were there for other offenses, like coercion, crimes against religion, weapons possession, or having a false identity.

Prostitution attracted many minors, especially in rural areas. This was an effect of the Spanish Civil War and the regime's crackdown on political opposition in the post-war period. Most of these minors were children of parents who died in the war, who were disappeared by both sides of the war, or whose parents were in prison for political crimes. In this period, many maids found themselves with unwanted male sexual attention they could not escape, and were sometimes sexually assaulted. They would become pregnant and be forced out of their jobs. Men would also blackmail them over these relationships. Because many were unmarried, when relationships were discovered, even ones a result of male coercion, they would be fired for being involved. This would leave these women destitute. Many turned to prostitution, as a result of lacking any other economic opportunities.

Prostitutes were held at facilities run by nuns through Patronato de Proteccion a la Mujer from 1941 to 1985. They were always a minority, representing between 7 and 10% of the population. They would be put into cells next to girls abandoned by their families, spending only a few nights. According to Carlos Álvarez, researcher at the University of the Basque Country, "Their confinement fulfilled two objectives: on the one hand to separate them from the rest of society, so that they did not influence it, and on the other hand to be 'rehabilitated', along the path of redemption."

Many men in this period were addicted to going to prostitutes. Culturally, their virility was held in high esteem, and they faced few consequences for having sex outside of marriage, as it demonstrated their regime-endorsed masculinity. This contrasted with women, who, if they had sex outside of marriage, were slandered by others who accused them, among other things, of being prostitutes.

While the state was more willing to believe in the rehabilitation of prostitutes during the 1940s and 1950s, the Roman Catholic church was not. The Church taught the practice was a mortal sin, along with the use of contraception which they argued was lowering birth rates in Spain and evidence of further immorality in society.

Number of prostitutes in Andalusia by city in 1941
City	Number of licensed prostitution houses	Number of unlicensed prostitution houses	Number of licensed hour rooms for prostitutes to rent	Number of licensed prostitutes	Number of clandestine prostitutes	Number of prostitutes per 1000 people	refs
Almería	24	0	0	150	Some	1.89	
Cádiz	34	16	15	350	Many	3.99	
Jerez de la Frontera	15	4	2 (12 total beds)	88	200	0.98	
El Puerto de Santa María	4	0	2	29	12 minors	0.99	
San Fernando	8	0	0	30 to 35	0	0.91	
Córdoba	46	0	14 (56 beds)	308	100 (mostly minors)	2.15	
Córdoba (province)	21	0		50		0.08	
Granada	79	0	1 or 2 beds	348	small number	2.24	
Huelva	39 (mostly on 3 streets)	Unknown	Houses run by women to let beds exist	130	No precise numbers	2.3	
Ayamonte	5	3 or 4	0 (13 beds)	16		1.32	
Rosal de la Frontera	0	0	0	0	30 in their homes, a few of whom are minors	0.0 / 8.66	
Isla Cristina	4	0	0	10	Some in external barrios	0.79	
Jáen	62	0	0	359	0	6.57	
Málaga	120	Reduced number	0	850	Many	3.57	
Sevilla	No available data						

Prostitution in the 1950s could be justified culturally if the women were mothers doing so in order to provide for their children. Para los niños was a common phrase among Spanish prostitutes in this period. A law was decreed on 20 December 1952 that made it more difficult for prostitutes to legally operate.

In Barcelona, in 1951, the official price for prostitution services for men at government-sanctioned brothels was US$0.15. When American soldiers visited, prostitutes working independently raised their prices for US$5.00. Legal minors were allowed to accompany American servicemen into hotels run by shady businessmen.

Prostitution was tolerated under controlled circumstances by the Franco regime until 1956. On 3 March 1956, by decree, prostitution was made illegal, and Spain joined the international fight to combat prostitution and fight the trafficking of women. Abolicionismo y prostitución. Justifación y defensa del Decreto-Ley de 3 de Marzo de 1956 was published by Enrique Jiménez in 1963, with its preamble being written by Foundation for the Protection of Women President Luis Martínez Kleiser. The text described prostitution as an infection, which needed a moral antibiotic to cure, with the state serving as the doctor to fix this illness.

An instructive order was issued on 26 April 1956 which explained the need to isolate the worst cases by providing accommodation in specialized facilities for single and pregnant teenagers. Such establishments were opened in Granada, Vigo, Cuenca, Albacete, Cartagena, Leon, and Madrid. The government allocated ten million pesetas (US$100,000) yearly to maintain these prison-like facilities holding over 3,000 women. This budget was increased to 35 million pesetas by 1963. By the end of 1956, the total number of freed women who had been at Foundation for the Protection of Women facilities was around 5,050. 41 came from Madrid, while 618 came from Barcelona, 400 from Valencia, 800 from Bilbao, 232 from Seville, 300 from Málaga, 300 from Cadiz, 248 from Zaragoza, 200 from Palma de Mallorca, and 202 from Las Palmas.

Ahead of the Year of the Woman, the government created eight commissions to investigate the status of Spanish women. The government used reports from these commissions to produce two reports that were published in 1975. They were La situación de la mujer en España and Memoria del Año Internacional de la Mujer. Among the findings, the government referred to prostitutes as maladjusted and marginalized women. In a report, they said, "It seems that modified the classic style of prostitution appearing this one with new forms which imply for a person who exercises it a form of multiple employment." That is, women who were prostitutes held jobs during the day and moonlighted as prostitutes during the day to supplement their income, all the while maintaining the impression that they were good and responsible women. The regime found the dual face of these women more despicable than if they were full-time prostitutes. The government blamed this on the failure to transmit the importance of ethical values inside a family, the large number of leisure places where these women could work, the media, consumer-driven culture, tourism, increased affluence among the Spanish people, and religion being deficient in passing along values that condemned prostitution. The commission proposed the government try to close places of leisure like clubs and pubs and party halls, that the police more strictly enforce the Law of dangerousness and social rehabilitation, and that more effort be put into rehabilitating prostitutes.

In the period between 1974 and 1978, feminists protested for amnesty for women, including those convicted of abortion, contraception, adultery, and prostitution-related offenses who were in prison. These feminists were attacked by the police, using tear gas and smoke bombs. Feminists also held protests in support of the decriminalization of adultery, equality in the workforce, the right to assembly, the ability to strike, and the suppression of images the movement felt were degrading to women.

== Depictions and slanders ==
The role of women in the Francoist period was to be mothers, and to submit to regime decisions around how women should live their lives. Women who challenged this narrative and exerted their independence were labeled "sluts" and "prostitutes". This was a form of trying to control these women in face of their defiance. During the 1940s, women who fought as guerrillas in the Spanish hinterlands were often labeled as "sluts" and "prostitutes", as part of an effort by the regime to slander them and dehumanize these women. During the 1950s, tourists started to visit Spanish beaches en masse. They wore shorts and bikinis, and played an important role in changing Spanish women's perceptions of other women, in that these clothes did not signify a woman was a prostitute.

Tattoo (Spanish: Tatuaje) was a famous song, written by Rafael de León and immortalized by Concha Piquer, during the 1940s and 1950s about a prostitute who fell in love with a foreign sailor, who searched him out from tavern to tavern. The image of the prostitute in the song was much more sympathetic than the official narrative about these women.

== Lesbians and trans women in prison ==
Lesbians in Francoist prisons were charged with prostitution, instead of homosexuality, which makes it impossible to determine their numbers, when compared to gay men. This was because the regime had only two categories for women's employment: housewife, and prostitute.

People accused of prostitution would often end up at Barcelona's Model Prison during the 1960s and 1970s. Included among this group were many homosexuals and trans women, who would then be subject to additional sexual abuse behind bars.

== See also ==
- Prostitution in Spain
- Prostitution in the Spanish Civil War
