= Prostitution in Spain =

Pablo Picasso's Les Demoiselles d'Avignon. An oil painting depicting five prostitutes from a brothel in Barcelona.

Prostitution in Spain is not addressed by any specific law, but a number of activities related to it, such as pimping, are illegal. In 2016, UNAIDS estimated there to be 70,268 prostitutes in the country, although other estimates put the number higher. Most prostitutes in the country are immigrants. The sex industry in Spain is estimated to be worth €3.7 billion.

== Legal status ==
=== History ===
Prostitution was tolerated in Spain throughout the mediaeval period, until the 17th century and the reign of Phillip IV (1621–65) whose 1623 decree closed the mancebías (brothels) forcing the women out into the street, a very unpopular decision, but one that remained in place till the 19th century. In the reign of Isabel II (1843–1868) regulation was introduced, firstly in cities, the Disposiciones de Zaragoza (1845) and the Reglamento para la represión de los excesos de la prostitución en Madrid (1847), followed by the 1848 Penal Code.

In 1935 during the Second Republic (1931–36) prostitution was prohibited. Once the Dictatorship (1939–75) was established, this law was repealed (1941). Spain became officially abolitionist on 18 June 1962, when the 1949 United Nations (UN) Convention for the Suppression of the Traffic in Persons and of the Exploitation of the Prostitution of Others was ratified by Spain, and the Decree 168 of 24 January 1963 modified the Penal Code (Código Penal) according to the convention. In theory, this policy, in accordance with the convention, regarded sex workers (trabajadores sexuales) as victims of sexual exploitation and advocated punishment of their exploiters rather than the workers themselves, and refused to distinguish between voluntary and coerced sex work. However, there were inconsistencies, as the prostitutes were in fact treated more like criminals: under Act 16/1970 of 4 August on social menace and rehabilitation (Ley de peligrosidad y rehabilitación social) prostitutes were declared amongst those classes categorized as social evils, and could be confined to special centres or forbidden to live in specified areas. In practice however, prostitution was quietly ignored and tolerated.

Although democracy was restored in 1975, it was not till the Penal Code revisions of 1995 that this policy was revisited, and most laws regarding prostitution were repealed, with the exception of those governing minors and those with mental health problems. This included the Act 16/1970. Further revisions in 1999 addressed trafficking, as did the 2000 Immigration Act which followed other European precedents by offering asylum to trafficked victims if they collaborated.

=== Current criminal laws ===
Prostitution was decriminalized in 1995. Prostitution itself is not directly addressed in the Criminal Code of Spain, but exploitation such as pimping is illegal.

The only article in the Code dealing specifically with adult prostitution is Article 187 of the Constitutional Law 10/1995, which bans pimping:

Whoever causes a person of legal age to engage in prostitution or to continue to do so, with the use of violence, intimidation or deception, or by abusing a position of power or the dependency or vulnerability of the victim, shall be punished with a prison sentence of two to four years and a fine from 12 to 24 months. Gaining profit from the prostitution of another shall incur the same penalty, even with the consent of that person. (Note: 1. El que determine, empleando violencia, intimidación o engaño, o abusando de una situación de superioridad o de necesidad o vulnerabilidad de la víctima, a persona mayor de edad a ejercer la prostitución o a mantenerse en ella, será castigado con las penas de prisión de dos a cuatro años y multa de 12 a 24 meses. En la misma pena incurrirá el que se lucre explotando la prostitución de otra persona, aun con el consentimiento de la misma''.)

Owning an establishment where prostitution takes place is in itself legal, but the owner cannot derive financial gain from the prostitute or hire a person to sell sex because prostitution is not considered a job and thus has no legal recognition.

Prostitution in Spain is less regulated than in many European countries. However, the advertising of prostitution has been made illegal and in 2022 a bill was put forward in the Spanish Parliament proposing the criminalisation of brothel-owning and pimping regardless of whether exploitation or abuse is involved, as well as criminalising the customers of prostitutes. The maximum sentence proposed is four years. The bill is supported by the governing Spanish Socialist Workers' Party. Street protests against the bill took place in Madrid in September 2022.

=== Local government ===
Local governments differ in their approaches to both indoor and outdoor prostitution, usually in response to community pressure groups, and based on "public safety". Most places do not regulate prostitution, but the government of Catalonia offers licenses for persons "to gather people to practice prostitution". These licenses are used by brothel owners to open "clubs", where prostitution takes place (the women are theoretically only "gathered" to work on the premises not employed by the owner). Some places have implemented fines for street prostitution.

=== COVID-19 pandemic ===
As part of the state of alarm due to the COVID-19 pandemic in Spain, all brothels and other places of entertainment were ordered to close.

=== Public policy ===
The key instruments in order of importance are the Penal Code (Código penal) (1822–) and the Immigration or Aliens Act (Ley de Extranjería de España) 2000.

Plans:

- Plan Municipal de Intervención ante la Prostitución en el municipio 2011–2014, Santa Cruz de Tenerife

== Public opinion ==
Opinion remains deeply divided in Spain over prostitution, and law reform has been in a political impasse for a long time. Consequently, it remains in rather a grey zone of unregulated but tolerated semi-legality. The standard debates exist as to whether it is work like any other work, or exploitation of women as espoused by groups like Malostratos. Meanwhile, it thrives, and has prompted headlines such as El nuevo burdel de Europa (The New Brothel of Europe).

== Migrant workers ==
In the 1980s, most of the sex workers in the country were Spanish, but by 2006 70% of sex workers were migrants according to a TAMPEP study, with 70-80% of those migrants being from Latin America, (mainly from Ecuador, Colombia and the Dominican Republic). After Bulgaria and Romania became EU members in 2007, a large number travelled to Spain and engaged in sex work. TAMPEP carried out a further study in 2009 and found 90% of sex workers were migrants. Of all countries studied, only Italy had proportion of migrant workers at comparable level. The 2009 study found the migrant sex workers were 49% were from Latin America, 24% from Central Europe (mainly Bulgaria and Romania) and 18% from Africa.

There was an influx of prostitutes from China in the early 2010s. From 2012 to September 2013, 544 prostitutes were identified in 138 inspections in brothels of Asian prostitutes in Barcelona. In the late 2010s a large number of Nigerian women have been trafficked into the country for prostitution.

Some prostitution is present at small farms (cortijos) outside of Roquetas de Mar. The prostitutes work in the service of organised criminal organisations linked to human trafficking. This, as they have a debt to pay to compensate the cost of being brought there. Many prostitutes are of Russian, Nigerian and Moroccan descent. Some women have taken up the job as prostitute after not being able to work in the intensive farming industry.

As in other countries in Western Europe, there are concern over the presence of migrant workers on the streets and claims that many of them were coerced. NGOs believe a large percentage of individuals in prostitution in Spain are trafficking victims. Various reports give figures of 80-90% of prostitutes in Spain being trafficked, but this is disputed. Other studies show 10% trafficked. In 2008 the Spanish Government announced plans to aid women who had been trafficked.

There is also cross-border prostitution between Spain and Portugal, and between Spain and France.

There are organisations working with migrant women, including Proyecto Esperanza and shelters such as IPSSE (Instituto para la Promoción de Servicios Especializados).

== Sex trafficking ==
Sex traffickers exploit foreign victims in Spain and, to a lesser extent, Spanish victims abroad. Women from Eastern Europe (particularly Romania and Bulgaria), South America (particularly Paraguay, Brazil, Colombia, and Ecuador), Central America (particularly Honduras, El Salvador, and Nicaragua), China, and Nigeria are exploited in sex trafficking. Authorities report Nigerian women now make up the largest demographic of sex trafficking victims. Sex traffickers exploit Venezuelan women fleeing the collapsing social and economic conditions at home.

Spanish law does not permit nor prohibit prostitution, and NGOs believe a large percentage of individuals in prostitution in Spain are trafficking victims. Various reports give figures of 80-90% of prostitutes in Spain being trafficked, but this is disputed.

Sex traffickers are increasingly using online apartment rental platforms to make their illicit operations difficult to track. An increasing number of victims arrived in southern Spain by sea via Morocco. Nigerian criminal networks recruit victims in migrant reception centers in Italy for forced prostitution in Spain. Unaccompanied migrant children continue to be vulnerable to sex trafficking. The increased numbers of newly arrived refugees and asylum-seekers are vulnerable to trafficking.

Law enforcement conducted targeted operations against 37 criminal organisations involved in sex trafficking in 2018. The judiciary initiated prosecutions of 63 defendants for sex trafficking. The government reported several cases in which convicted traffickers received significant penalties. In January 2019, an Oviedo court sentenced four Romanians to 20 to 55 years in prison for forcing 12 Romanian women into prostitution.

The United States Department of State Office to Monitor and Combat Trafficking in Persons ranks Spain as a 'Tier 1' country.

In February 2025 police arrested 48 people during raids in Alicante and Murcia in connection with sex trafficking. The gang are alleged to have trafficked 1,000 women mostly from Colombia and Venezuela during the previous year. The women were lured to Spain to work in the work in the cleaning and beauty sectors but were then forced into prostitution.

== Advocacy ==
Organisations working with sex workers in Spain include APRAMP (Associacion para la Prevención, Reinserción y Atención de la Mujer Prostituida) while sex workers' rights organisations include Hetaira (Madrid), as well as regional organisations such as SICAR Asturias, AMTTTSE (Asociación de Mujeres, Transexuales y Travestis como Trabajadoras Sexuales en España, Málaga) and CATS (Comité de Apoyo a las Trabajadoras del Sexo, Murcia).

Spanish sex workers continue to be concerned about their lack of protection and in July 2011 petitioned the Minister of Health (Leire Pajín). A demonstration is planned for 6 November 2011 in Madrid, and a communique has been released setting out sex workers' complaints and demands.

The Organización de Trabajadoras Sexuales (OTRAS) was formed in August 2018 and registered with Spain's Labour Ministry as a trade union. Feminists and activist opposed the formation of the union and instigated a campaign on social media against them using the hashtag #SoyAbolicionista (“I’m an Abolitionist”). Abolitionist groups brought a court action against OTRAS, which resulting on OTRAS's statutes being annulled on the grounds that there can be no employment contract for prostitutes and therefore they were not "workers" in terms of employment law, but the court did not dissolve the union. However, in February 2019, the Superior Court of Justice of Madrid ruled that a prostitute working in a club in Barcelona had a valid employment relationship with the club owners.

== Social history ==
Prostitution in Spain was highly sectored, with at one end the damas cortesanas of high society, and the mistresses of the bourgeoisie and barraganas, the concubines of the clergy. (Harrison)

== Sex work celebrities in Spain ==
La señora Rius (see photograph) is a Barcelona celebrity and Madam who told her story in Julián Peiró's La Sra. Rius, de moral distraída.

== Sex work in Spanish art ==
Goya (1746–1828) frequently commented on the place of prostitution in Spanish high society and Catholic church. In his print series Los Caprichos, Goya specifically satirized the corruption and greed of the Church and the clergy. A print in the series named A Young Woman Pulling Up Her Stocking satirized the clergy profiting off of (participating in) the sins which they punished the congregations for committing. Other examples are Murillo's Four Figures on a Step and Picasso's Les Demoiselles d'Avignon (illustrated).

In literature, Miguel de Cervantes discusses prostitution in his early 17th century novel Don Quixote, and the subject is found throughout 19th- and 20th-century Spanish literature.

== Overseas autonomous communities ==
=== Canary Islands ===
In 2006, 42 people were arrested following the discover of a prostitution ring operating out of nightclubs in Las Palmas and Telde. The prostitutes were from South American countries, mainly Brazil. Five people were jailed as a result.

In 2012, a councillor in Santa Cruz de Tenerife told the ABC newspaper about the city's draft plan for prostitution. He said that, in cases examined by NGOs, all the prostitutes were women of which 9% were transsexual women.

A study is 2016 estimated there were around 3,000 prostitutes working on the islands, mainly in the tourist areas and the cities of Santa Cruz de Tenerife and Las Palmas.

=== Ceuta ===
Prostitution occurs in the Ceti (Temporary Reception Center) in Ceuta. The prostitutes are mainly Nigerian women.

=== Melilla ===
Local NGO Melilla Acoge, which provides medical and other assistance to prostitutes, report that there are about 1,000 Moroccan prostitutes in Melilla. Some cross over the border into Melilla in the mornings and leave at midday, other cross over the border in the afternoon and leave at night.

== See also ==
- Outline of Spain
- Prostitution in Francoist Spain
- Prostitution in the Spanish Civil War
- State feminism
- Empathy and Prostitution
- Padre Putas – Catholic cleric caring for prostitutes in Salamanca, Spain

== Other sources ==
- Barberet, Rosemary; Bartolomé Gutiérrez, Raquel (1995). Victimología y prostitución (Report). hdl:10578/21319.
- Celia Valente: The politics of prostitution: The Women's Movement, State Feminism and Parliamentary Debates in Post-Authoritarian Spain. Queen's University Belfast 2003
- Gemma Nicolás: Planteamientos feministas en torno al trabajo sexual (Jornades Drets Socials i Dones en la Globalització: per una nova ciutadania. Barcelona 2005)
- Rut González: Quality of life and interpersonal needs in prostitution. Sexologia Integral 2006
- Hart, A. (1998). Buying and Selling Power: Anthropological Reflections on Prostitution in Spain. Boulder, Colorado: Westview Press. Archived from the original on 22 October 2012 – via Questia.
- GUEREÑA, Jean-Louis. La prostitución en la España contemporánea. Madrid: Marcial Pons, Ediciones de Historia. SA, 2003, reviewed by Rafael Alcaide González in REVISTA BIBLIOGRÁFICA DE GEOGRAFÍA Y CIENCIAS SOCIALES (Serie documental de Geo Crítica)Vol. IX, nº 508, 5 de mayo de 2004
- Neira, Montse. Una mala mujer: La prostitución al descubierto. Plataforma Editorial SL, Barcelona 2012 144pp. ISBN 978-84-15-11571-7

=== History ===
- Lanz, Eukene Lacarra (2002). "Legal and Clandestine Prostitution in Medieval Spain". Bulletin of Hispanic Studies. 79 (3): 265–85. doi:10.3828/bhs.79.3.1.
- ME Perry. Magdalens and Jezebels in counter-reformation Spain, in Culture and control in counter-reformation Spain, Anne J. Cruz (ed.) U of Minnesota Press, 1992, p. 124ff
- Guereña, JL (1998). "Physicians and prostitution: a project to regulate prostitution in 1809: the 'Exposition' of Antonio Cibat (1771-1811)". Medicina e Historia (71): 5–28. PMID 11636945.
- Guereña, JL (1995). "The origins of the regulation of prostitution in contemporary Spain from Cabarrús's proposal (1792) to the Madrid Regulations (1847)". Dynamis (Granada, Spain). 15: 401–41. PMID 11624755.
- Guereña, Jean-Louis (2008). "Prostitution and the Origins of the Governmental Regulatory System in Nineteenth-Century Spain: The Plans of the Trienio Liberal, 1820–1823". Journal of the History of Sexuality. 17 (2): 216–34. doi:10.1353/sex.0.0000. PMID 19260164. S2CID 42440112.
- Guereña, JL (1997). "Prostitution, the state, and society in Spain. The regulation of prostitution under the monarchy of Isabel II (1854-1868)". Asclepio. 49 (2): 101–32. doi:10.3989/asclepio.1997.v49.i2.368. PMID 11636886.
- Canaleta Safont, Eva; Pujades Móra, Joana Maria (2008). "Medical discourse and municipal policy on prostitution: Palma 1862-1900". Dynamis. 28: 275–99. doi:10.4321/s0211-95362008000100012. hdl:10481/77579. PMID 19230342.
- Harrison, Nikki (2008). "Nuns and Prostitutes in Enlightenment Spain". Journal for Eighteenth-Century Studies. 9: 53–60. doi:10.1111/j.1754-0208.1986.tb00121.x.

=== Literature ===
- Carmen Y. Hsu. Courtesans in the Literature of Spanish Golden Age (Kassel: Reichenberger, 2002)

=== Migration ===
- L Oso. The new migratory space in Southern Europe: the case of Colombian sex workers in Spain, in Crossing Borders and Shifting Boundaries: Gender on the move, Umut Erel, Kyoko Shinozaki (eds.) VS Verlag, 2003, p. 207ff
- Oso Casas, Laura (2010). "Money, Sex, Love and the Family: Economic and Affective Strategies of Latin American Sex Workers in Spain". Journal of Ethnic and Migration Studies. 36: 47–65. doi:10.1080/13691830903250899. S2CID 216139639.
