= Hora de España =

Literary magazine in Spain (1937–1938)

- Categories: Literary magazine
- Frequency: Monthly
- Founder: Luis Cernuda; Juan Gil-Albert
- Founded: 1937
- First issue: January 1937
- Final issue: October 1938
- Country: Spain
- Based in: Valencia
- Language: Spanish
- ISSN: 0212-9795
- OCLC: 405723948

Hora de España (Spanish: Spain's Hour) was a monthly literary magazine which was published in Valencia, Spain, by the Republicans during the Spanish Civil War. The subtitle of the magazine was Poesía y crítica (Poetry and criticism). It existed between January 1937 and October 1938.

== History and profile ==
Hora de España was first published in January 1937. The founders were a group Spanish intellectuals led by Luis Cernuda and Juan Gil-Albert. The magazine was published on a monthly basis. It featured poetry, drama and essays on contemporary literature. Major contributors were the members of the Generation of '27, including Emilio Prados, Dámaso Alonso, León Felipe, Miguel Hernández, Antonio Machado, Rafael Alberti and Rosa Chacel. Hora de España was subject to criticisms over its passive political stance. The magazine ended publication in October 1938 shortly before the exile of its founders.
