= Matilde Ras =

20th-century Spanish writer, translator, and graphologist

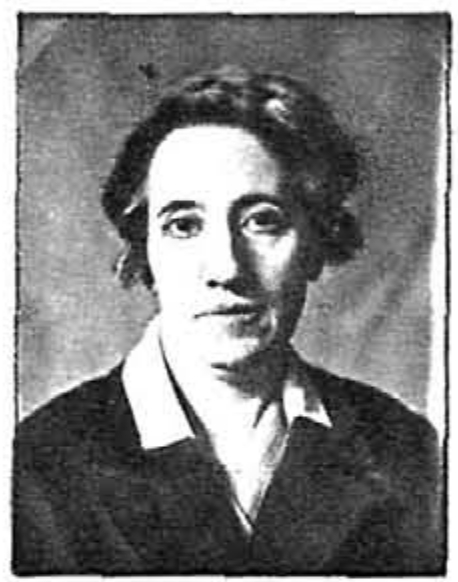
- in Estampa, 1929
- Born: September 1, 1881; Tarragona, Spain
- Died: April 15, 1969 (aged 87); Madrid, Spain
- Citizenship: Spanish
- Occupations: Writer, translator, and graphologist
- Parents: Antonio Ras (father); Matilde Fernández Casanova (mother)

Matilde Ras Fernández (Tarragona, 1 September 1881–Madrid, 15 April 1969) was one of the pioneers in scientific graphology in Spain. She was a great connoisseur of the classics and a specialist in the analysis of Don Quixote, as well as a translator, columnist, essayist, novelist, playwright, and screenwriter.

== Biography ==
Matilde Ras was born in Tarragona in 1881 into a family that was part of the intellectual circles of the time. Her father, Antonio Ras, was an architect. Her mother, Matilde Fernández Casanova (born ca. 1860–died 1931), studied teaching in France and, upon her return to Spain, worked as a journalist for several newspapers.

Her only brother, Aurelio, was a year younger than her. When Matilde was two years old, the family moved to Cuba, leaving the brother in Spain with a nursemaid. After her father's death in Cuba, Matilde and her mother returned to Spain, where they settled in Tarragona, Barcelona, Zaragoza, and Soria, and finally in Madrid, where Matilde finished her high school studies.

From a very young age, she showed a great predisposition for literature. She read a lot and wrote short stories and comics, which became very successful when they were published in several children's magazines. Moreover, she also showed a great predisposition for drawing. Later, at the age of 18, she started working as a teacher. Given her knowledge of French, which her mother had taught her, she translated poems by Paul Verlaine, Charles Baudelaire, and Paul Valéry, among others. She became a passionate reader of Voltaire.

In social and political matters, Matilde Ras defined herself as a conservative feminist who, even while distancing herself from the most orthodox positions, adhered to the principles of Catholicism. She also strived to combine a maternal and domestic role with the demand for equality and the need for women's education and personal and professional fulfillment both inside and outside the home.

She was part of the generation of Spanish feminists with a group consciousness who, together with Elena Fortún, were members of Victorina Durán's Sapphic Circle of Madrid. Many of the members of this circle also belonged to the Lyceum Club Femenino, (Note: A branch of the International Association of Lyceum Clubs) founded in 1926. Committed to the defense of women's rights, they demanded a new role for women in society, and even confronted figures such as Ramón y Cajal, Gregorio Marañón, and Pilar Primo de Rivera.

The friendship between Fortún and Ras began in the 1920s when they both collaborated with magazine Blanco y Negro. They kept their romantic relationship private. They were separated when Fortún decided to follow her husband into exile after the end of the Spanish Civil War. Ras remained in Spain. She collaborated several times with the magazine Horizonte, and later went into exile in Portugal between 1941 and 1943. While there, she wrote her Diario, in which she recounted the sufferings of the civil war and her stay in Portugal, a haven of peace while Europe was immersed in World War II.

She returned to Madrid, where she died in 1969.

== Graphology ==
From an early age, she became interested in graphology, following the discovery of the book Méthode pratique de graphologie by Jean-Hippolyte Michon. She soon became acquainted with L'écriture et le caractère by Jules Crépieux-Jamin, the father of French graphology, which was later translated and published in 1933. Around 1910, she approached literary magazine Por esos mundos to offer her services as a graphology consultant. After analyzing the handwriting of several members of the editorial staff, they accepted her proposal.

In 1917, publishing house Editorial Estvdio, in Barcelona, published her first book: Grafología. Estudio del carácter por la escritura, with an introduction by Crépieux-Jamin himself. In mid-1923, the Board for the Extension of Studies and Scientific Research (JAE) granted her a scholarship. She moved to Paris to further her studies at the Société Technique des Experts en Ecritures (STEE) and later obtained a diploma in forensic graphology. Thanks to her work to spread awareness in the media, she introduced classical French graphology in Spain, Portugal, and Latin America. Her work in graphology, apart from appearing in various specific volumes, was published in numerous collaborations with magazines and newspapers in Madrid, such as: Por esos mundos, Heraldo de Madrid, Blanco y Negro, and Estampa, among others. After living in Paris for a few years, she returned to Spain in 1925 and started working with ABC, a collaboration that would continue throughout her life. In 1929, publishing house Editorial Labor published her second book, Grafología: las grandes revelaciones de la escritura. Around that time, she also wrote the section on graphology in the encyclopedia Enciclopedia Espasa-Calpe.

Gradually, she became the expert to go to for questions about the field of graphology. In addition to her work as adviser to companies and private consultants, her private classes (from 1917 until her retirement, she maintained a graphological consultant office in Madrid), and her collaborations in newspapers and magazines in Spain and abroad, she also worked as a professor of Practical Graphology and as lecturer at the International Institute in Madrid.

== Writer and translator ==
The success of her pioneering graphological studies has overshadowed her literary work, which ranges from children's stories to theatre plays. She worked as a translator, focusing on the classics of children's literature, such as Charles Perrault, the Brothers Grimm, and Hans Christian Andersen. She was a great connoisseur of the classics and was considered an expert in the analysis of Don Quixote.

In 1915, she published Cuentos de la Gran Guerra, in which she tells the life journey of ordinary citizens in the context of the war.

There is evidence of the fact that she maintained correspondence with various artists, with the best known being Víctor Català, whom she considered the perfect interlocutor and with whom she maintained an epistolary relationship between 1904 and 1964.

== Influence ==
In July 2006, the Matilde Ras Award was created by the Instituto de Psicografología y Peritación (IpsigraP) in Madrid. It is awarded every year to graphologists who have stood out or contributed to the field through their research.

In July 2018, the Herstóricas. Historia, Mujeres y Género association and the Autoras de Cómic collective created a cultural and educational project, consisting of a card game, to raise awareness about the historical contribution of women in society and reflect on their absence. One of these cards is dedicated to Ras.

In the play Elena Fortún, produced by the Centro Dramático Nacional in 2020, Matilde Ras appears as a secondary character. She was played by actress Irene Martín Guillén.

== Works ==
=== On graphology ===
- Grafología. Estudio del carácter por la escritura (1917)
- Grafología: las grandes revelaciones de la escritura (1929)
- Grafología (1933)
- La inteligencia y la cultura en el grafismo (1945), Editorial Labor
- El retrato grafológico (1947), Ediciones Plus Ultra
- Historia de la escritura y grafología (1951), Ediciones Plus Ultra
- Los artistas escriben (1953), Ediciones Alhambra
- Lo que sabemos de Grafopatología (1963)

=== Other works ===
- Donde se bifurca el sendero (1913)
- Cuentos de la Guerra (1916), short story anthology
- Quimerania (1918), short story anthology
- Charito y sus hermanas (1946)
- Diario (1946), dedicated to Elena Fortún, written during Ras's exile in Lisbon
- Heroísmos oscuros (1968)
- El amo and El taller de Pierrot (1934), theatre plays collected by Cristóbal de Castro for the book Teatro de mujeres. Tres autoras españolas.
- La hermosa hilandera y los siete pretendientes, children's play adapted by Fortún from a short story by Ras

== See also ==
- Sapphic Circle of Madrid
- LGBT literature in Spain
- Elena Fortún
- Caterina Albert
- Lesbians in the Spanish Second Republic

== Bibliography ==
- Aguilera Sastre, Juan (2011). "Las fundadoras del Lyceum Club Femenino" (PDF). Brocar. Cuadernos de investigación histórica. (in Spanish) (35). La Rioja, Spain: University of La Rioja: 65–90. doi:10.18172/brocar.1595. ISSN 1885-8309.
- Capdevila-Argüelles, Nuria (2014). Introduction. El camino es nuestro. By Ras, Matilde; Fortún, Elena. Fraga Fernández-Cuevas, María Jesús (ed.). (in Spanish). Santander, Spain: Fundación Banco Santander. pp. xiii–xxxiv. ISBN 978-84-92543-64-9.
- Ras, Matilde (2016). Fraga Fernández-Cuevas, María Jesús (ed.). Cuentos de la Gran Guerra (in Spanish). Ediciones Espuela de Plata. ISBN 9788416034789.
- — (2018). Fraga Fernández-Cuevas, María Jesús (ed.). Diario (in Spanish). Sevilla: Editorial Renacimiento. ISBN 978-84-17266-70-7.
- Russo, Antonella (2016). Catálogo y estudio de la revista Horizonte. Arte, literatura y actualidades, Sevilla-Madrid 1938–1942 (in Spanish). Sevilla: Ediciones Ulises. ISBN 978-8416300280.
- — (2019). "Teatro de mujeres en la Edad de Plata: dos piezas de Matilde Ras" (PDF). Orillas, rivista d'ispanistica (in Spanish) (8). Padua, Italy: Padova University Press: 313–331. ISSN 2280-4390.
- — (2022). "Matilde Ras en la prensa de la Edad de Plata: reportajes en Heraldo de Madrid (1927–1931)". Anales de Literatura Española (in Spanish) (37). Alicante: University of Alicante: 143–165. doi:10.14198/ALEUA.2022.37.07. hdl:10045/123241. ISSN 2695-4257.
- — (2023). "Matilde Ras en París (1923-1926): diarios inéditos". Anales de Literatura Española (in Spanish) (39). Alicante: University of Alicante: 301–326. doi:10.14198/ALEUA.24313. hdl:10045/134928. ISSN 2695-4257.
