= Lola Rodríguez Aragón =

Spanish soprano and teacher (1910–1984)

- Born: Lola Rodríguez de Aragón; 29 September 1910; Logroño, La Rioja, Spain
- Died: 30 April 1984 (aged 73); Pamplona, Navarre, Spain
- Education: Santa Cecilia Academy
- Occupations: Singer; teacher; entrepreneur
- Partner: Marisa Roësset Velasco
- Musical career
- Genre: Soprano
- Instrument: Vocals
- Years active: 1945–1980

Lola Rodríguez de Aragón (29 September 1910 – 30 April 1984) was a Spanish soprano singer, entrepreneur and music teacher. She founded "Escuela Superior de Canto" and taught music to several well-known Spanish musicians.

== Early life and education ==
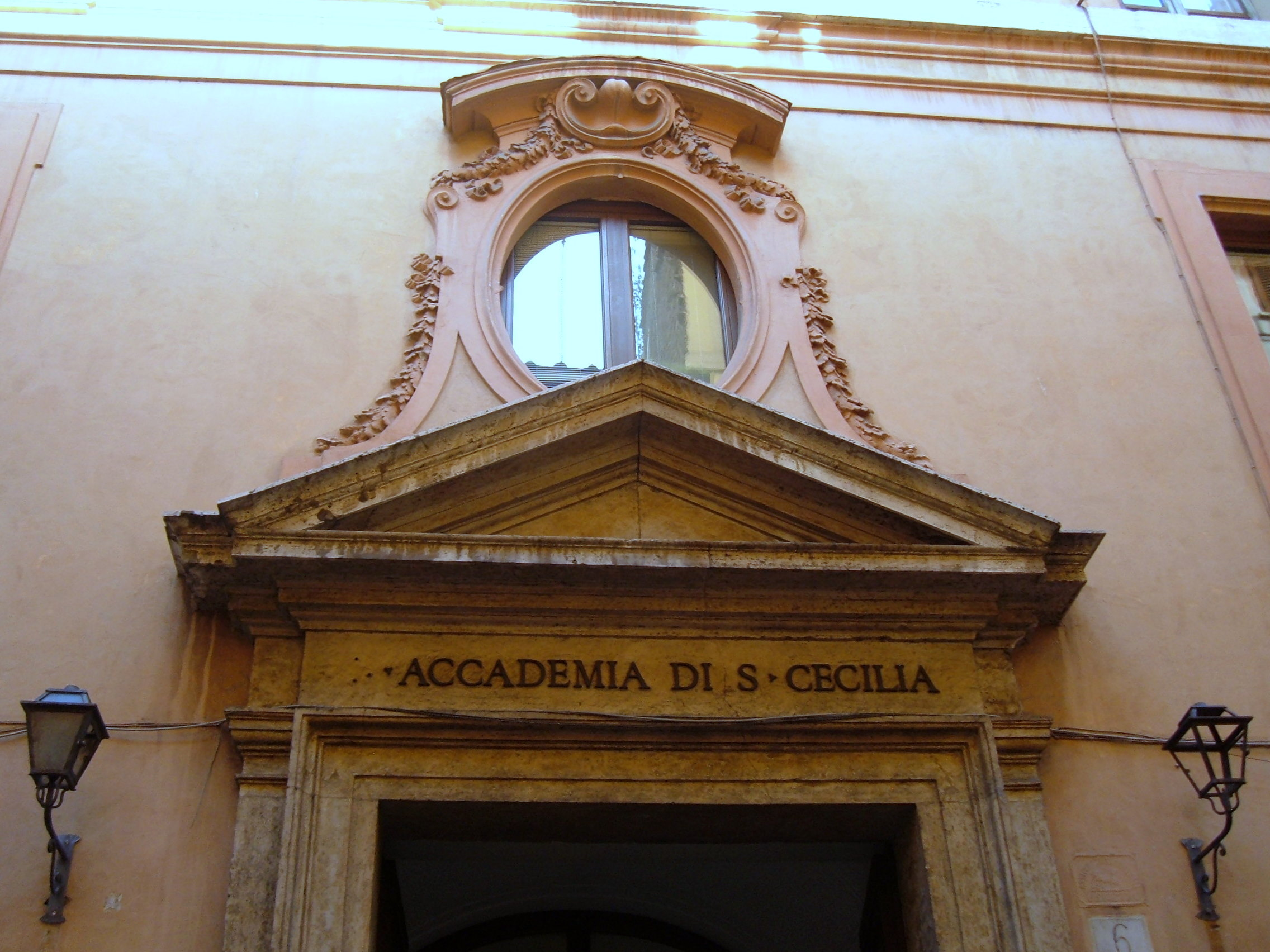
Santa Cecilia Academy

Lola Rodríguez de Aragón was born on 29 September 1910 in Logroño, although she later claimed Cádiz as her birthplace. Her parents, Dolores Aragón Ortigosa and Horacio Rodríguez Martínez, had eight children, with Lola being the eldest. The family moved to Cádiz in 1918, where Lola began studying piano and solfeggio at the Santa Cecilia Academy at the age of seven. By age 10, she performed as a soloist with the academy's choir. In late 1921, the family relocated to Zaragoza, where Lola continued her piano education. In June 1922, her brother Pepe died in Zaragoza, followed shortly after by her cousin Juan.

The family's fate was once again altered in the fall of 1925 when they relocated to La Coruña. It was then that Lola, then 15 years old, started taking voice lessons from the singer and instructor Bibiana Pérez. At the age of 16, she performed her first public concert in the Teatro Rosalía de Castro in La Coruña in the spring of 1927. Pérez's students take part in the show, and she achieved great success. Her family relocated to Madrid in September 1928, when Horacio, her father, was named the Marquess of Casa Domecq's representative in Madrid, Galicia, and Portugal.

Lola first met composer Joaquín Turina at his Madrid home in the summer of 1930, where her singing impressed him greatly. Turina later dedicated several compositions to her. She pursued advanced musical studies in Madrid, learning composition and harmony from Turina, piano from José Cubiles, and singing from Ida Gobatto. Turina encouraged Lola to continue her vocal studies abroad, leading her to Paris where she studied French concert repertoire during the winters of 1934 and 1935. In Paris, she worked with Russian vocalist Anna El-Tour and Claire Croiza on French vocal repertoire, and she formed connections with composer Joaquín Nin and his wife. Additionally, Lola received advice on singing operatic repertory from María Barrientos while in Paris.

In the summer of 1934, Lola relocated to Garmisch-Partenkirchen, Bavaria, to study German repertoire with Elisabeth Schumann. Her collaboration with Schumann focused on German concert repertoire, particularly Mozart's operas and Lied, significantly shaping her musical style and technique. In December 1934, under maestro Enrique Fernández Arbós, Lola performed Turina's Canto a Sevilla with the Madrid Symphony Orchestra, achieving great success. Shortly thereafter, she debuted the same piece in Paris with the National Orchestra of France, accompanied by Joaquín Nin on piano, and also presented a recital of Spanish songs at the Salle Gaveau.

The Spanish Civil War and World War II severely disrupted Lola's successful singing career in Madrid and Paris, which had a profound effect on her creative trajectory. She first met Marisa Roësset Velasco, who became her life partner, in the summer of 1938 while in La Coruña. Following the war, she started teaching singing at the Madrid Royal Conservatory in October 1939 and was hired on a regular basis in 1944. Between 1940 and 1942, she had a flirtation with Federico Sopeña while juggling her singing and teaching duties.

== Singing career ==
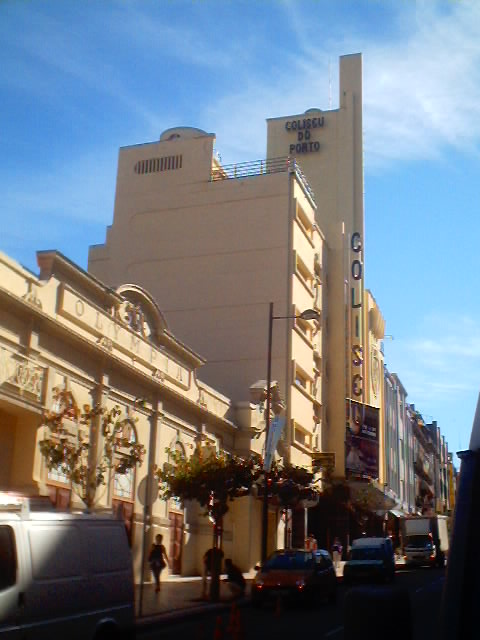
Coliseu do Porto in 2004

Lola Rodríguez de Aragón made her operatic debut in May 1945, participating in the official seasons at the Coliseu do Porto in Porto and the Teatro Nacional de São Carlos in Lisbon. Early performances included Salud in Falla's La Vida Breve and Susana in Mozart's The Marriage of Figaro, in which she found considerable popularity as an actress and singer. Inspired by this response, during that year Lola, as creative director, planned Madrid's first "Official Opera Season" at the Theatre of María Guerrero. Opera premieres during the season included The Magic Flute by Mozart, Il combattimento di Tancredi e Clorinda by Monteverdi, and La serva padrona by Pergolesi. Lola directed the artistic vision and played the lead roles alongside Luis Escoba.

At the Teatro Albéniz in Madrid, Lola arranged the second "Official Opera Season" in 1946. She played the roles of "Norina" in Donizetti's Don Pasquale and Zerlina in Mozart's Don Giovanni. Furthermore, in Madrid on 24 May 1946, she recorded four sung songs from Turina's Canto a Sevilla, in addition to Tu Pupila es Azul and Los dos Miedos, with Turina providing piano accompaniment. At the Spanish Theater, she staged her fourth "Opera Season" in 1950. Alongside her students, she took part in the 1948 debuts of Joaquín Rodrigo's works, notably Cuatro madrigales amatorios. She debuted Rodrigo's Barcarola with piano accompaniment by Victoria Kamhi. On 12 April, she also sang the world premiere of Romance del Comendador de Ocaña with the Chamber Orchestra under the direction of Ataúlfo Argenta.

As a member of the international singing jury in the First International Music Competition for singing, piano, and violin in Scheveningen, Netherlands, in May 1948, Lola represented Spain. María de los Ángeles Morales, her pupil, took first place in the singing competition. Lola was devastated at Turina's death in January 1949 since she had lost a friend and mentor. Together with Roberto Pla, she co-founded Cantores Clásicos in 1949 at Radio Nacional de España. The group's membership eventually grew to 22 singers, including well-known vocalists. Later on, this group became known as the National Radio Choir of Spain, and Lola was closely involved in its growth.

Following her father's death on 2 May 1953, Lola took over the role of family financial manager. At the II International Music Festival of Granada on 28 June 1953, she sang pieces by Manuel de Falla, including El retablo de maese Pedro, under the direction of Argenta, at the Palace of Charles V in Granada. This was her last show in Spain as a singer. She gave her last performance of the same program—dedicated to Falla—in Strasbourg in the spring of 1955, accompanied by Argenta and the National Orchestra of Spain. In April 1953, Lola also recorded three albums: Trujamán, Tonadilla and Canto a Sevilla. She continued to perform in concerts with her Madrid Conservatory pupils in 1953–1954, when she served as a mentor to well-known vocalists like the mezzo-soprano Teresa Berganza.

== Entrepreneurship ==
As a member of the jury for the IV International Singing Competition of Toulouse in October 1957. Lola started a new career as a theatrical entrepreneur in the fall of 1958, managing Madrid's Teatro de la Zarzuela for two seasons until September 1960. She was the organiser of important musical events, such as Zarzuela seasons with debuts of Pablo Sorozábal pieces like Las de Caín and performances of Marina. Along with organising seasons of Spanish and foreign ballets with performances by Pilar Lopez, and companies like London's Festival Ballet and Ballet Théâtre de Paris by Maurice Béjart, Lola also organized an "Italian Opera Season" with well-known singers like María Callas and Renata Scotto.

Despite suffering large financial losses, Lola was an entrepreneur at the Teatro de La Zarzuela. She made the decision to work alongside José Tamayo in her second season in order to share financial risks and obligations. She started a long-standing initiative in 1961: a Higher School of Singing and a National Choir with the intention of working with the National Orchestra of Spain on symphonic-choral concerts. In April 1962, Manuel Lora-Tamayo proposed this ambitious concept to Minister of Education Jesús Rubio. The proposal was eventually given the go-ahead by the Education Council, but budgetary limitations delayed its execution. The choir of students of the Royal Conservatory of Music made its debut with the National Orchestra of Spain in March 1963.

From May to June 1964, Lola produced the wildly popular "1º Opera Festival in Madrid" at the Teatro de la Zarzuela, which included worldwide opera luminaries like Alfredo Kraus and vocalist Berganza. The festival was highly praised and featured operas such as Tosca by Puccini. She successfully oversaw the casts of her students' performances in August 1966. She demonstrated her status in the international opera world by serving as a jury member at Tokyo's international singing contest in March 1967. She instructed a singing course at the English Bach Festival in Oxford in June and July 1968. Along with four of her pupils, she established the "Cuarteto de Madrigalistas de Madrid" in 1969 with the goal of advancing both the worldwide polyphonic repertory and Spanish Renaissance polyphonic music.

The Higher Institute of Art of the Teatro Colón in Buenos Aires recruited Lola in the spring of 1969 to teach a five-month singing course that ran from May to October 1970. With the backing of Director General of Fine Arts, she pursued her long-held goal of founding a Higher School of Singing and a Choir in Madrid before to her departure. The Higher School of Singing and its choir, which would eventually become the National Choir of Spain, were formally established in January 1970 with the publication of an official decree. In May 1970, she left for Buenos Aires and returned in October to open the school. She remained director there until her retirement in 1980.

On 22 October 1971, the National Choir of Spain debuted to great applause at the Teatro Real, where they sang Mahler's Symphony No. 2 alongside the National Orchestra of Spain conducted by Rafael Frühbeck de Burgos. During her nine years as conductor, she worked with renowned national and international directors and oversaw more than fifty choral works composed by forty composers. In acknowledgment of her contributions to Spanish music, she was named a member of the Institute of Hispanic Culture in October 1972. Following her resignation as director of the National Choir of Spain in December 1979, the Escuela Superior de Canto in Madrid held a commemorative concert in her honour.

== Later years and death ==
In June 1980, Lola announced her retirement as director and professor of singing. Berganza gave a concert in her honour. Even after being designated Honorary Director of the Escuela Superior de Canto in September 1980, she kept teaching, giving classes at the Paris Opera's School of Lyrical Art and the Casa Mateus Foundation in Portugal. In the early hours of 30 April 1984, she died in the University Clinic of Pamplona. After her body was moved to the Escuela Superior de Canto in Madrid, prominent members of Spanish politics, the arts, music, and culture attended the funeral. The National Choir of Spain sang at her funeral, which was conducted at the Church of the Incarnation of Madrid, after the King of Spain, Felipe VI, sent a sincere message to her family.

== Awards and recognitions ==
- Interpretation Award (1941) from the National Performing Trade Union, for her significant impact on the musical landscape of her own country.
- Isabel Castello prize (1958)
- Lazo de Isabel la Católica (11 June 1964) for her contributions to Spanish music as a performer, educator, and event planner.

== Legacy ==
=== Reputation ===
When questioned about her connection with Lola in an interview with Inés Rivadeneira, she said, "It was extraordinary." She was more than just an advisor and teacher—she was like a second mother. All that the kids and I had to tell her about our lives, histories, and passions... An amazing mentor—extremely essential, very smart, and a lady with a clear future vision." It was said that Lola's tone was usually dark and plangent with lots of vibrato—the real variety, not a wobbly wobble—which gives these Spanish melodies their due. Another stated that her voice was not very good, but she captures every nuance of the words with her precise enunciation, and she exudes character—whether it be coquettish, sultry, or melancholic, depending on the situation.

=== Things named after her ===
Numerous honours and scholarships bearing her name have been established in her honour, such as:

- Lirico Lola Rodríguez Aragón Award, which was founded by her pupil Jorge Chaminé
- Lola Rodríguez Aragón End of Career Award
- In Memoriam de Lola Rodríguez Aragón" scholarship
