= Sapphic Circle of Madrid =

- Círculo Sáfico de Madrid
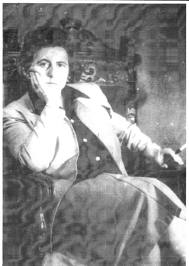
- Victorina Durán, the founder and leader of Sapphic Circle of Madrid
- Location: Madrid, Spain
- Key people: Victorina Durán

The Sapphic Circle of Madrid (Spanish: Círculo Sáfico de Madrid) was a network of intellectual lesbian women created by Victorina Durán that played an important social and cultural role for this minority in Madrid in the 1920s.

== History ==
The founding of the group may have been inspired by similar ones that already existed in London and Paris, and came from the city's feminist circles, specifically the Residencia de Señoritas and the Lyceum Club Femenino. Although the word "lesbian" It was already present in the Spanish language in 1870 and was used interchangeably with "sapphic", it was not a word that lesbians of the time could safely use in Madrid to describe themselves.

The clandestine nature of the meetings and the group allowed its members to enjoy a safe space to meet and have discussions, and to explore their feelings and inclinations. They did not have a fixed location so as not to be easy to be located, but starting in 1935 they began to meet at Gabriela Mistral's house. The Sapphic Circle came to an end with the beginning of the Spanish Civil War in 1936, although the group continued to operate in exile at least until 1945, with Victorina Durán, Elena Fortún and Rosa Chacel (sympathizer) among those who participated in meetings on Saturdays in Buenos Aires, and with Matilde Ras in contact with the other women from Lisbon. Rosa Chacel wrote a novel where this circle is partially and very subtly mentioned, Acrópolis (1984). Other members also wrote about it, such as Victorina Durán, Sucede y Así es (2018) and Elena Fortún Oculto sendero, (2016) and El pensionado de Santa Casilda (2022). Other women belonging to this circle were Victoria Kent, Matilde Calvo Rodero, and Irene Polo.
