= APRAMP =

Spanish organisation in 1984

Association for the Prevention, Reintegration and Care of Prostituted Women (APRAMP)
- Type: Non-government organization
- Founded: 1984
- Headquarters: C / Jardines, 17 Ground floor 28013 Madrid., Spain
- Revenue: 3,459,000 (2024)
- Website: apramp.org

The Association for the Prevention, Reintegration and Care of Prostituted Women (Asociación para la Prevención, Reinserción y Atención a la Mujer Prostituida) or APRAMP for its acronym, is a Spanish organization created in 1984, dedicated to support the people who suffer sexual exploitation, forced prostitution and trafficking.

It has its headquarters in Madrid and delegations in Salamanca, Asturias, Almería, Murcia and Badajoz. Its president and founder is Rocío Nieto, a social worker and pioneer in the fight against prostitution and trafficking in persons for the purpose of sexual exploitation and the current head of the organization is Rocío Mora Nieto, founding member of the Spanish Network Against Trafficking in Persons of which APRAMP is a part.

In 2005 the organization published La prostitución. Claves para reflexionar sobre un problema, a pioneering guide to face and analyze prostitution, sexual exploitation, pimping, trafficking of women and children and the relationship between prostitution and gender violence.

== Trajectory and programs ==
The association was established in 1984 with the objective of addressing the unmet needs of sexually exploited women and to be a bridge between them and public services, supporting them in the recovery of freedom and rights.

Since 1985 the first Comprehensive Care Centers and Training Workshops and self-employment workshops began to be created, in 1989 a "Short Stays and Care for Drug Dependents" apartment was inaugurated, in 1990 a mobile unit service for the care of victims on the ground was set up and in 1998 a flat for female victims of trafficking was created.

Since 1999, APRAMP has attended the crisis Unit, by phone 24 hours, managing immediate responses in emergency situations of prostituted women and / or victims of trafficking.

It also promotes cooperation projects with the countries of origin of the women they serve, such as Brazil and Paraguay. These are projects focused on the prevention of trafficking and coordination with authorities to ensure, where appropriate, the proper return to their countries of origin.

When we started our work, only 10% of people in prostitution were foreigners; today the percentage is already 95% Rocío Nieto stated in the Intervention guide with victims of trafficking for health professionals.

=== Rescue Units ===
Among the services of APRAMP are the "rescue units", composed of human trafficking professionals, who have specialized training, and who daily work to break the slavery of these women and provide information on the rights that have been violated.

In 2014 APRAMP assisted 1,442 women in Spain in 2014. Per day, they serve an average of 280 in different parts of Madrid (private floors, streets and other spaces).

== Organization ==
The organization is chaired by Rocío Nieto, social worker and pioneer in Spain in the fight against sexual exploitation, prostitution and human trafficking and coordinated by Rocío Mora Nieto, a law graduate with specific training in women, immigration, health, social labor orientation, therapy and family mediation. He has been responsible for APRAMP programs since 1995.

The organization has its headquarters in Madrid and delegations in 5 Spanish cities: Salamanca, Asturias, Almería, Murcia and Badajoz.

== See also ==
- Human trafficking
- Prostitution in Spain
