= Rosa Chacel =

Spanish writer

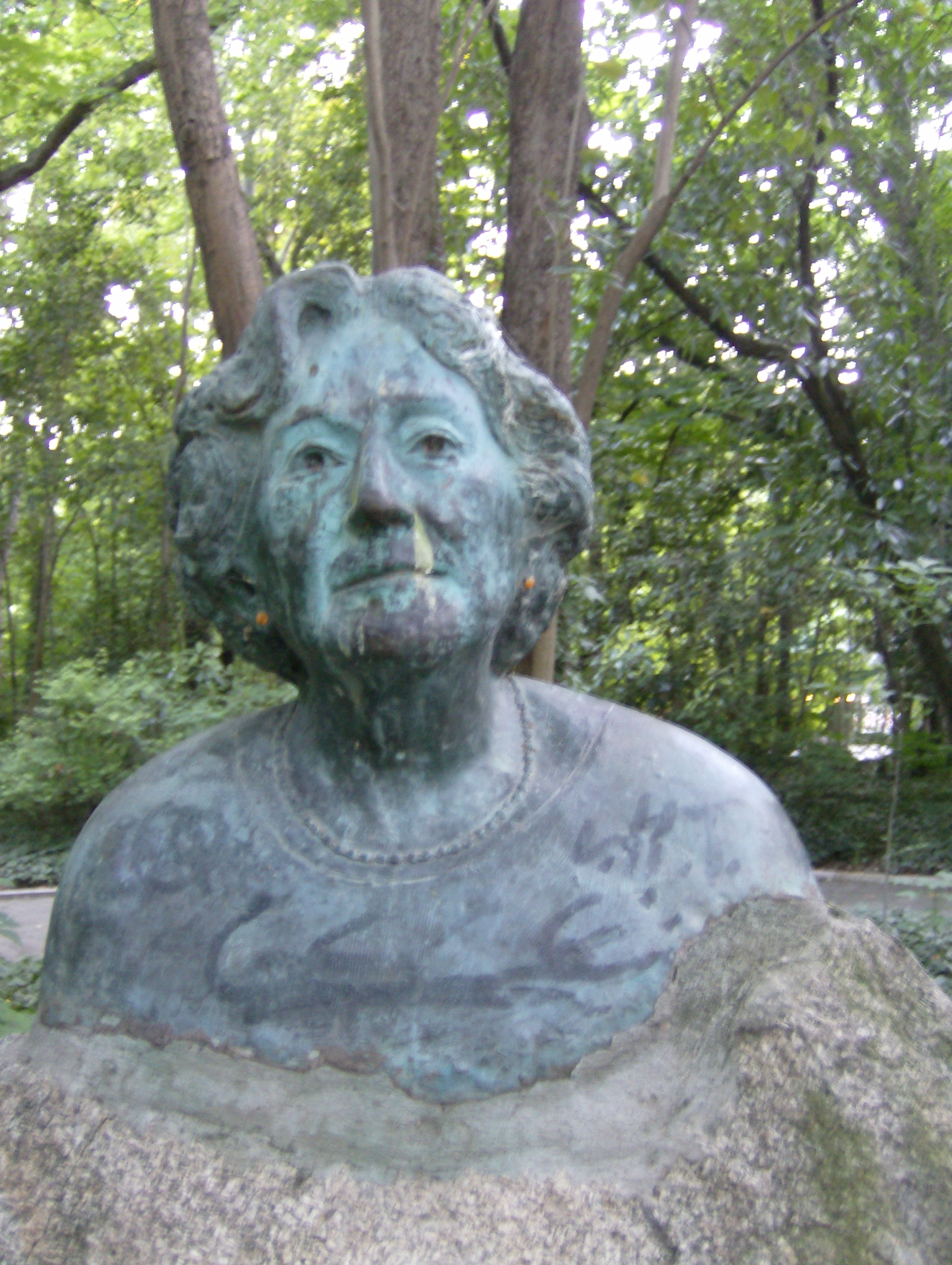
- Bust of Chacel in Valladolid (1988) by Francisco Baron
- Born: Rosa Clotilde Chacel Arimón; 3 June 1898; Valladolid, Spain
- Died: 27 July 1994 (aged 96); Madrid, Spain

Rosa Clotilde Chacel Arimón (3 June 1898 – 27 July 1994) was a Spanish writer. She was a native of Valladolid.

== Early life ==
Chacel was born in Valladolid, the daughter of a teacher who sent her to live with her grandmother in Madrid. Chacel's move to Madrid occurred in 1908. Because of her weak health, she was home-schooled by her mother.

By 1909, Chacel's mother enlisted her at Madrid's Escuela de artes y oficios to study drawing, but, soon after, Chacel followed her teacher, Fernanda Francés, to the newly built Escuela del hogar y Profesional de la Mujer, also in Madrid. It was while in the latter school that Chacel began to take some feminist views. In 1915, Chacel, intrigued by the world of sculpture, enrolled at the Escuela Superior de Bellas Artes de San Fernando, but she soon lost interest in the aforementioned topic and abandoned the school by 1918.

Chacel then went on to become a regular at the Cafe Granja del Henar and at the Ateneo de Madrid. These two places were favorite locations for aspiring writers from all over Spain and other European countries. She delivered a controversial speech there, after a conference about women and their possibilities. Like much of the world at that era, machista views predominated in Spain, and Chacel's dialogue on that conference were considered off base or nonsensical by many members of Madrid's society.

Chacel, nevertheless, went on championing feminism as a new way to live for modern women, and, in 1921, she married a famous painter of the time, Timoteo Perez Rubio. In 1922 the couple settled in Rome after Pérez Rubio was granted a scholarship at the Academia de España. That same year, Chacel wrote her first article for the Ultra magazine. In 1927, she and her husband returned to Madrid.

In 1930, Chacel wrote her first novel, Estacion, Ida y Vuelta. That same year, the Perez Rubio-Chacel couple had a child, Carlos. For the next three years, Rosa dedicated herself to motherhood and to promoting her novel. In 1933, she lived alone for six months in Berlin, to recover from her mother's death and a creative crisis. Soon after her return to Spain, the Spanish Civil War broke out. Pérez Rubio enlisted in the Republican Army and Chacel performed, among other things, as a nurse. During the same period she also contributed literary magazines Hora de España and Revista de Occidente.

This new, political problem, forced Chacel to move multiple times with her son, and she lived in Barcelona, Valencia, Paris. In the meantime, her husband had the responsibility of moving out of the country the treasuries of the Museo del Prado to preserve them from the war devastation. After the end of the war, the family reunited and travelled to Brazil, where they lived for three decades, with short stays in Buenos Aires.

== Exile ==
The next years Chacel lived in relative obscurity: a well-known writer but one who had made no new projects in years. This changed in 1959, however, when she won a Guggenheim Fellowship, which allowed her to travel to New York City and return to writing. Chacel worked in New York until 1961, when, with her home country living a calmed down social state, she returned to Spain. In May 1963, Chacel returned to Brazil, where she remained until 1970, when she returned to Spain for a short stay. She would live in Brazil for three more years, as, in 1973, she made her second return to her home country.

== Return to Spain ==
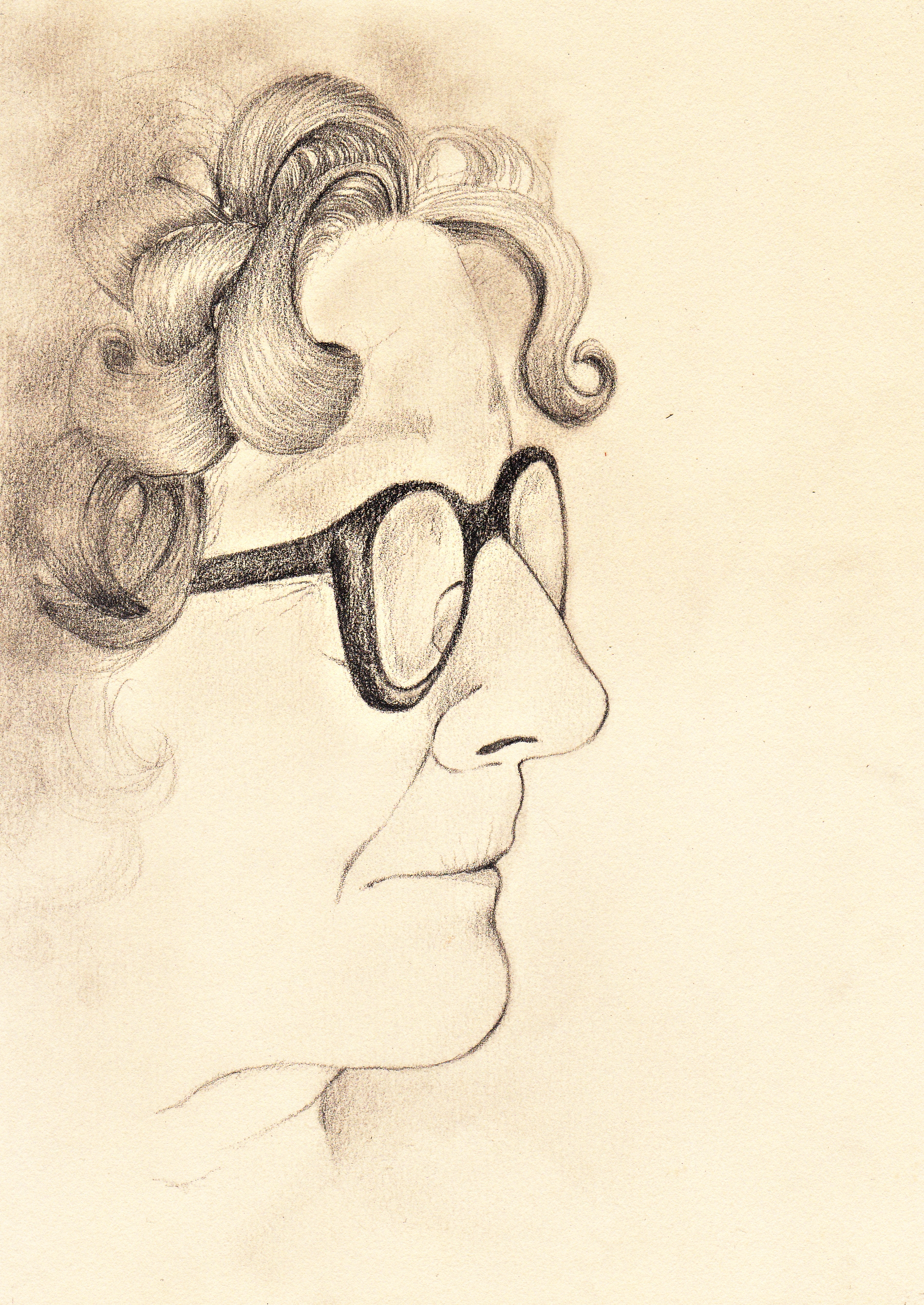
Rosa Chacel

In 1977, her husband of 56 years died, and Chacel, who was a very frequent flyer between Madrid and Rio de Janeiro, decided to stay in Spain for good. She used her newly found status as a widow to try to rescue some of her old works and to write more novels.

Her works include Acrópolis, published in 1984 and in which she writes about the Sapphic Circle of Madrid, of which she was a member along with Victorina Durán, Elena Fortún, and Matilde Ras.

== Death and legacy ==
She died peacefully in Madrid on 7 August 1994, aged 96.

The Spanish national airline Iberia Airlines – a company which Chacel perhaps saw as it grew – just like in Luisa Carvajal y Mendoza's case, decided to honor Chacel by naming an Airbus A340 jetliner airliner after her. Perhaps ironically, the "Rosa Chacel Airbus A340" flies very frequently between Madrid's Barajas International Airport and Buenos Aires' Ezeiza International Airport or Rio de Janeiro.

== Awards and honors ==
- Guggenheim Fellowship
- Chacel was granted a Doctor Honoris Causa degree by the University of Valladolid (1989).
- Towards the end of her life, she won various prestigious awards, some of whom were given by King Juan Carlos.
- In 1987, she received the "National Award of the Letters (writing)", an award reserved for the very best writers of Spain.
- In 1990, she received the "Premio Castilla y Leon de las letras" ("Castilla y Leon award of the letters"), an award whose winners are chosen by the King.

== Works ==
=== Novels ===
- Estación. Ida y vuelta, 1930.
- Teresa, 1941, Buenos Aires, Nuevo Romance.
- Memorias de Leticia Valle, 1945, Buenos Aires, Emecé.
- La Sinrazón, 1960, Buenos Aires, Losada.
- Trilogy Escuela de Platón:
  - Barrio de Maravillas, 1976, Barcelona, Seix Barral.
  - Acrópolis, 1984, Barcelona Seix Barral.
  - Ciencias naturales, 1988, Barcelona, Seix Barral.
- Novelas antes de tiempo, 1981, Barcelona, Bruguera.

=== Short Story ===
- Sobre el piélago, 1952, Buenos Aires, Imán.
- Ofrenda a una virgen loca, 1961, México, Universidad de Veracruz.
- Icada, Nevda, Diada, 1971, Barcelona, Seix Barral.
- Balaam y otros cuentos, 1989, Relatos infantiles, Barcelona, Mondadori.
- Narrativa Breve, 2003, Valladolid, Fundación Jorge Guillén (Obra Completa; 7).

=== Poetry ===
- A la orilla de un pozo, 1936.
- Versos prohibidos, 1978, Madrid, Caballo Griego para la Poesía.
- Poesía (1931-1991), 1992, Barcelona, Tusquets.

== Books and newspapers ==
- Rosa Chacel: premio nacional de las letras españolas, 1987 (in Spanish). Anthropos Editorial. 1990. ISBN 9788476582169..
- Jueves (1994-07-28). "Muere Rosa Chacel, maestra de la aventura íntima". El País (in Spanish)..
- Staff Le Monde (1994-07-29). "Mort de l'écrivain espagnol Rosa Chacel". Le Monde (in French)..
- Kirkup, James (1994-07-29). "Obituary: Rosa Chacel". The Independent..
- Page, Eric (1994-08-02). "Rosa Chacel, 96, A Spanish Novelist Exiled for 36 Years". The New York Times..
- Santa, Àngel; Didier, Béatrice; Fouque, Antoinette; Calle-Gruber, Mireille (2013). "Chacel, Rosa (Valladolid 1898 - Madrid 1994)". Le dictionnaire universel des créatrices (in French). Éditions des femmes. p. 818..
