= Prostitution in the Spanish Civil War =

Sexual services for payment during the war in Spain (1936-1939)

Prostitution in the Spanish Civil War was part of a larger ideological battle about the role of women and race. Opposition to it came from both first-wave feminists and fascists, who would often have connections to beliefs about racial purity in their condemnation of prostitution. Accusations of prostitution would also be made to damage political and social enemies.

In the modern pre-Second Republic period, prostitution was illegal in Spain, though in the latter period, efforts were made to legalize it under the justification that it would assist in improving people's health by better addressing the spread of venereal disease.

During the Dictatorship of Primo de Rivera, being a labeled a prostitute could be a disqualifier from participating in public life. Women in the anarchist CNT opposed prostitution as part of wider efforts related to women's emancipation.

The Second Republic period saw Spaniards oppose prostitution as they argued in favor of racial purity arguments and maintained it led to the spread of venereal disease. Starting in 1931 and continuing through to 1935, the Second Republic adopted both an abolitionist and regulatory approach to appease both sides of the debate.

During the Civil War, prostitution became an important issue for many women on the left to the confusion of foreign feminist allies. With women featuring heavily in propaganda on both sides, milicianas were accused by military and political leaders of being prostitutes and nymphomaniacs, in order to discredit their involvement on the front lines. Nationalist military members would often use female prostitutes on the home front.

It is difficult to assess the extent of the problem of prostitution in the Franco period since lesbians, considered undesirable, were simply accused of being prostitutes.

== Background ==
Accusations of prostitution have been used as slanders against women as a form of disempowerment dating back to the Christian Bible. Accusations of being a prostitute have also been used to define who is a "good woman" and who is a "bad woman." False accusations would also be made to discredit social and political opponents.

=== Prostitution and feminism ===
Feminism from this period fostered a belief that women should work to better the state through the better nature of women, with their more caring and nurturing natures. This extended into the domain of having greater ability to control their own reproductive activities by virtue of being the ones who gave birth.

First-wave feminism in Spain started around 1850 and continued until around 1950. Middle-class and upper-class women in early Spain became feminists as they became more self-aware of the inequalities they faced as a result of men viewing them as intellectually inferior. Ideologically, first-wave feminism was diverse in its approach to dealing with problems faced by women but generally centered around providing women with access to education and participation in public life as part of a broader strategy to demonstrate women's intellectual capabilities. This wave largely ended internationally as a result of achievements in gaining universal suffrage, which had the underlying belief that women were intelligent enough to vote. It was highly influenced by socialism. In places like Portugal, first-wave feminist was sometimes called "corset feminism" because it came from middle-class women who could afford to buy corsets and other trappings of femininity. In contrast, second-wave feminism is defined more by women's liberation movements and equal rights efforts. This group wanted to do away with women's sexual repression that they associated with "bourgeois morality".

First-wave feminism saw often itself opposed to prostitution on the grounds women were morally and spiritually superior than men, and they served important roles of protecting men in society by acting as moral and spiritual gatekeepers. Opposition to prostitution was also on the grounds that banning prostitution was needed to protect women and children from abuse committed by men. In yet other contexts, opposition to prostitution was about the need to redeem women's morality. For some, mostly in the United States and Catholic parts of Europe including Spain, opposition to prostitution was on the grounds that it was little more than part of a white slave trade and to improve the purity of society. Those arguing against prostitution because of white slavery were often separated from the broader first-wave feminist movement.

=== Fascism and prostitution ===
Fascism sometimes supported regulated prostitution. Opposition to prostitution was much more frequent, often because of a belief that legalization of prostitution would result in a surge of men getting sexually transmitted diseases. In other cases, it was opposed as a violation of religious beliefs. Many fascists in this period believed that women were defined around reproduction. Thus, the greatest opposition to prostitution often involved a belief that prostitution represented a deep moral and racial crisis. Fascists would slander political enemies of being or supporting prostitutes, as demonstrated through the spread of venereal disease which hurt a country on the whole. Jews in multiple countries would be accused of supporting prostitution.

== Prelude to the Second Republic (1800–1922) ==
Prostitution had been illegal in Spain since 1864, with varying periods with changing legal statutes. Prostitution was legal in pre-Second Republic Spain. Trying to legalize prostitution was difficult, because the bans for it in the mid-19th century existed on the provisional level so a national solution was not easily attainable though local police did have lists of prostitutes. This was eventually solved by treating prostitution as a health crisis and creating the Special Regulation of the Service of Hygiene of Prostitution in 1905 by the Real Consejo de Sanidad. National police were charged with enforcing it in its first year, before local police took over the job in 1909 with police listings being problematic as some women were listed as prostitutes who offered their services for free.

Prostitution was legalized in Spain in a move viewed as very progressive by male leadership at the time. It was viewed as a way to isolate venereal disease and to provide a way for men to relieve their natural urges while protecting women more broadly and the honor of Spanish families. By legalizing prostitution, the government also hoped to curb male masturbation and homosexuality. Meanwhile, poor, white women had to fear being trafficked as slaves.

The 1870 Penal Code had allowed for pimping and prostitution. It was modified in 1904 to make pimping illegal. Sumptuary laws in Spain in this period meant prostitutes were able to wear articles of clothing and jewelry that more respectable, moral women could not. The International Agreement 1904 signed in Paris required the Spanish government to monitor for the trafficking of women at railway stations and ports. If prostitutes were found trying to enter Spain from abroad, they were supposed to be repatriated to their home countries.

In 1918, venereal disease began to be recognized as a real problem in Spanish society and a few clinics began allowing prostitutes to use them to avoid the spread of these infections. Specialized clinics for venereal disease would begin to spread around the country starting in 1920. Later laws said people with venereal disease could be required by doctors to undergo involuntary treatment for it.

Real Patronato para la Represión de la Trata de Blancas was created in 1902 to fight prostitution and the spread of venereal disease in Spain, being overseen by Queen Consort Maria Cristina. It would continue until 1931, and, outside the Queen Regent, the board had mostly male membership or women of aristocratic birth with little interest in the topic. Their primary activity was reporting alleged prostitutes to the police, and then trying to get these women to stop by putting them into a shelter. Margarita Nelken was particularly critical of their efforts in this period, seeing the organization as highly ineffectual in helping women.

The Sociedad Española del Abolicionismo was created in 1922 by César Juarros, the first organization of its kind seeking the abolition of prostitution in Spain.

== Dictatorship of Primo de Rivera (1923-1930) ==
The 8 March 1924 Royal Decree's Municipal Statute Article 51 for the first time included an appendix which would allow electoral authorities on a municipal level to list women over the age of 23 who were not controlled by male guardians or the state to be counted. Article 84.3 said unmarried women could vote in municipal elections assuming they were the head of household, over the age of 23, not prostitutes and their status did not change. Changes were made the following month that allowed women who met these qualifications to run for political office.

During this period, CNT members in many places were required to meet clandestinely. Women continued to refine their positions during the Dictatorship of Primo de Reivera. In the 1920s, anarchists viewed women having fewer children, increased sex education and the elimination of prostitution as position that would provide resistance to institutions and ideologies they opposed, including capitalism, religion and the military. These changes would also emancipate women, by defining them around a task other than reproduction.

== Second Spanish Republic (1931–1937) ==
There was opposition to prostitution in this period because of the belief that it destroyed the Spanish race and it led to the spread of venereal disease. Anarchist women condemned middle-class and upper-class women over their views on prostitution. Anarchists believed that they supported prostitution so the lower classes would be polluted, while middle and upper-class women could maintain their appearances of chastity.

The Second Republic abolished Patronato para la Trata de Blancas by decree on 1 July 1931, and replaced it by decree on 11 September 1931 with Patronato de Protección de la Mujer. This created a regulatory framework for the legalization of prostitution while at the same time putting Spain into compliance with international agreements and more broadly promised to work towards the abolition of prostitution in Spain. The drafts of laws for the Second Republic as they related to prostitution were writing by Sánchez Covisa, Méndez Bejarano, Sáinz de Aja, Bravo and Jiménez de Asúa. In April 1932, all taxes on prostitution were eliminated, even if the intention of putting those funds towards anti-venereal services was used. This debate would continue through to 1935, as the Second Republic adopted both an abolitionist and regulatory approach to appease both sides of the debate. During one of these debates, Clara Campoamor took to the floor of the Congreso de Diputados, saying,

The law can not regulate a vice; the law can not say that in order to achieve Health, it freely opens the doors of brothels to youth; because if the Health pursues the end it pursues, it would have caused infinitely greater damage (...). Without these houses of prostitution sustained, protected and respected by the State, the evil that is pursued internationally could not have reality or effectiveness (...) It is necessary that the law deals with ther aspect and declares, once and for all, that the regulation, because the victims of prostitution are, in 80 per cent, underage women, and it is really a cruelty and even a formidable irony to see our civil laws protecting the minor, depriving her of personality even to conclude a contract, for acquire money on loan, to sell a property, to express their will, and that, on the other hand, do not give any protection when it comes to the freedom to treat your body as a commodity. The women that we have dedicated ourselves to investigate ther problem, ther social scourge, we have found, amazed, that in the Dispensaries a medical "card" is issued today; but what will be its sanitary guarantee-that fiction pursued by the State when regulating-when it does not dare to stamp on said "card" more than these words: "Sana probable." Ther is what is said of the woman recognized. As well; these "carnets" are given in the Medical Dispensaries without the applicant proving their age of majority, without a single document, without the departure of the Civil Registry and without leaving a single trace of the file.

-- Clara Campoamor

The 1933, the Ley de Vagos y Maleantes removed homosexuality as a crime from the books, except among members of the military. Beggars, ruffians, pimps and prostitutes were still considered criminals. Passing on 4 August 1933, it was approved unanimously in the PSOE and Communist dominated Congreso de Diputados.

== Spanish Civil War (1936–1939) ==
During the Civil War, some women resorted to prostitution because they were starving and had nothing else they could barter with. It was a decision of last resort as their husbands, brothers and fathers who supported them were killed during the war. Spanish authorities responded to this showing two faces at the same time, openly tolerating the practice while at the same time condemning only the women involved with it. During the war, entrenched gender roles continued to exist, alongside it included prostitution.

Federica Montseny, in charge of the Public Health and Welfare portfolio from November 1936 to May 1937, started schools to assist prostitutes in learning new trades.

Even after Nationalists took control of an area, the Second Republic regulatory system for prostitution continued and would not end until the official end of the war.

=== Mujeres Libres ===
Mujeres Libres became one of the most important women's anarchist organizations during the Civil War. Their Civil War ranks were aided by women moving over from CNT to participation in their organization. One of their biggest struggles during the Civil War was around fighting prostitution. Education was viewed a key aspect of this, as they believed educated women would be less likely to turn to prostitution. They had over 20,000 members by 1938.

Foreign anarchists found organizations like Mujeres Libres baffling, as discussions around women's rights by Spanish anarchist women were often based around expanding rights while at the same time maintaining traditional gender roles. Older members were often critical of younger ones, viewing them as being too hesitant to act and considering them obsessed with sexuality, birth control and access to abortions.

=== Slander and propaganda ===
Women involved on the Republican side of the Civil War were defamed as a matter of course by nationalists, accused of spreading venereal disease, of being immoral and unnatural. Young women who displayed overt femininity on the Nationalist side during the war were also slandered over their sexuality, and accused of being traitors to the state for flirting with men. Women associated with Mujeres Libres were at times dismissed as prostitutes for their challenge of traditional gender roles. Women who found themselves in prison would often accuse other women of being prostitutes to try to imply their state was better than theirs. This was because for women in Nationalist prisons, there was no way for these women to differentiate themselves as political prisoners whom they were often housed alongside.

Military and political leaders slandered milicianas, accusing them of being prostitutes and nymphomaniacs, representing a greater threat to the Republic than the fascist forces they were facing in battle because they spread venereal disease. (Note: Mika Etchebérhère in Ma guerre d'Espagne à moi published in Paris in 1976 contends that some women were straight up prostitutes, encouraged to the front by the presence of single men who had money.) (Note: María de la Luz Mejias Correa in Asi fue pasando el tiemp: memorías de una miliciana extremeña published in 2006 in Seville said that despite going to the front to accompany her husband, local women in the area still called her (incorrectly) a prostitute and a slut. These local women also accused milicianas of spreading venereal disease. While there were some brothels near the front, they were not run by milicianas and de la Luz Mejias Correa contends that men who went to brothels were never accused of spreading venereal disease.) Clara Campoamor would be among a number of voices urging women off the front, accusing women of being prostitutes. When this was shared among milicianas, it made some of their blood boil, as it demonstrated to them that the left was no better than the right when it came to protecting women's rights. Such rationales, along with lack of weapons training, were used to make an argument that women should be removed from the front. Rosario Sánchez Mora, La Dinamitera, reacted in anger when interviewed, saying that comparisons to prostitutes hurt her as these women were ready to die for their ideals and ready to die for those who shared in their leftist ideology. Milicianas often created and shared narratives that highlighted their chastity during the Civil War. When interviewed by the press, many women were offended by questions about their private lives. Nationalist propaganda in contrast often depicted the miliciana as a prostitute. In the end, milicianas featured in propaganda published by both sides during the Civil War often served as a symbol of a gendered cultural ideal. Their depictions were often for the male gaze on both sides of the propaganda war. The way there were often drawn as highly sexualized beings made it easy for those on both sides to dismiss them as prostitutes.

=== Nationalist military ===
Salamanca and Burgos became home to large numbers of women who were wives of military officers on the Nationalist side. They could largely live comfortable, as their part of Spain was not in a state of total war. Both cities had zones for homes, and military zones. The military zones were home to medical services and to prostitutes. Nationalist nurses working in these zones were viewed as essential but transgressive, as they were occupying male spaces. As such, their behavior was always highly watched. Poverty and economic need often pushed many women into prostitution, where it flourished behind Nationalist lines. That Nationalist forces were fighting for a Spain that supported traditional family structures and opposed to prostitution did nothing to stop Nationalist officers from using prostitutes. These brothels would often involve binge drinking on the part of officers and physical violence enacted upon the bodies of the women they bought.

== Francoist Spain (1938–1973) ==
Prostitution and how to combat it was a problem for the Franco regime given its historical acceptance and Catholic views opposing it. A zealous system of monitoring public morality was created to combat it.

Lesbians in Francoist prisons were charged with prostitution instead of homosexuality, which makes it impossible to determine their numbers when compared to gay men. This was because the regime had only two categories for women's employment: housewife and prostitute.
