= Consuelo Gil =

Spanish publisher (1905–1995)

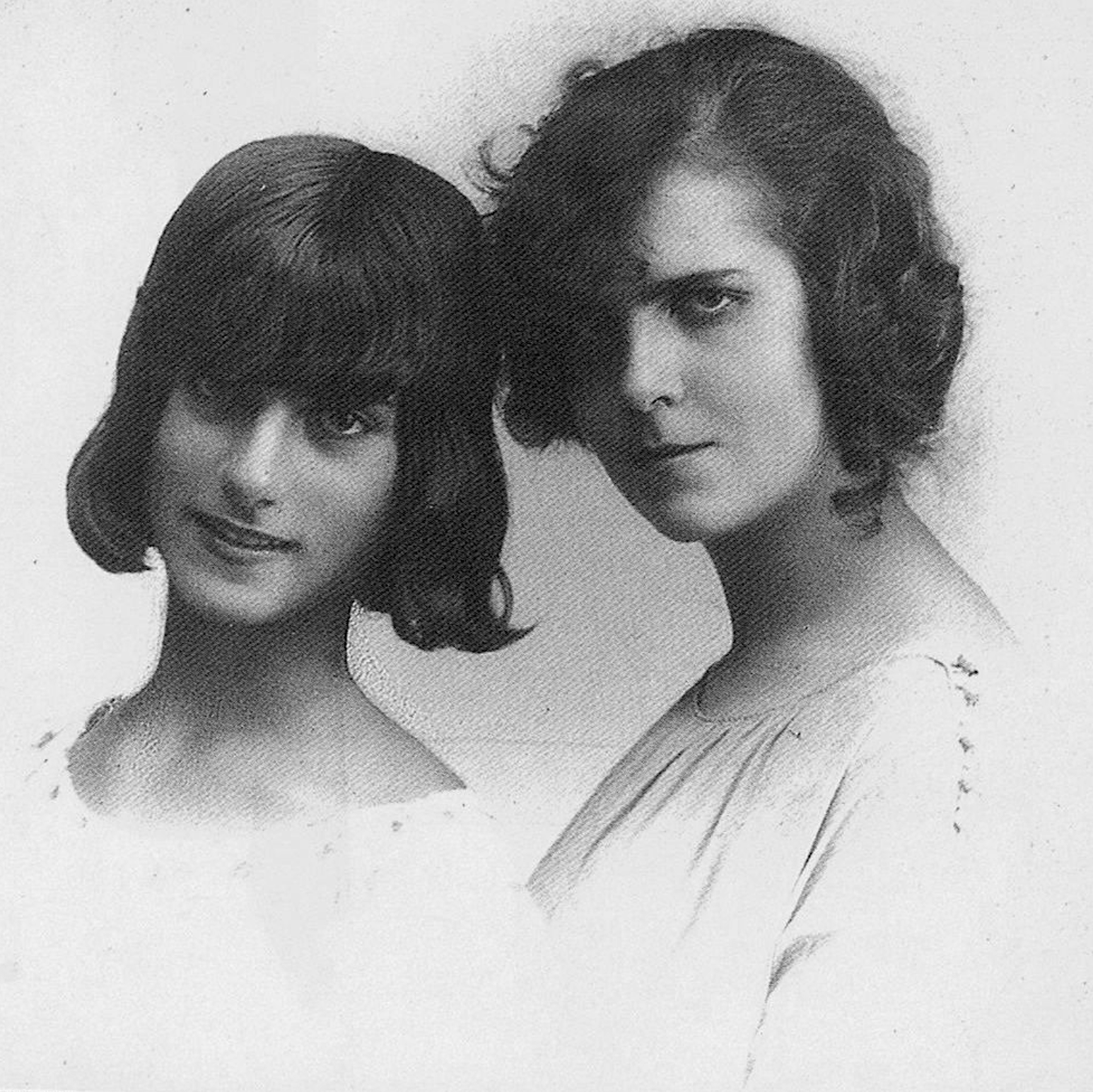
- Consuelo (left) and Margarita Gil Roësset, sisters as young girls
- Born: Consuelo Gil Roësset; 1905; Madrid, Spain
- Died: September 26, 1995; Madrid, Spain
- Other names: Consuelo Gil Roësset de Franco, Consuelo Franco, L. de Villadiego, Madrina
- Education: Central University of Madrid
- Occupation(s): Publisher, editor, translator, writer
- Spouse: José María Franco Bordons
- Children: 3
- Relatives: Margarita Gil Roësset (sister), María Roësset Mosquera (aunt), Marisa Roësset Velasco (cousin)

Consuelo Gil Roësset (1905–1995) was a Spanish publisher, editor, translator, writer, and teacher. She was known for her work on Spanish postwar period children's illustrated magazines, specifically Chicos (magazine) (1938–1955), Mis Chicas (1941–1950) and El Gran Chicose (1945–1950). After her marriage she used the name Consuelo Gil Roësset de Franco, Consuelo Franco, and used the pseudonyms L. de Villadiego and Madrina.

== Early life, family, and education ==
Consuelo Gil Roësset was born in 1905, in Madrid, to parents Cecilia Margot Roësset Mosquera, and Julián Gil Clemente. She had three siblings, her younger sister was Margarita "Marga" Gill Roësset, a sculptor, illustrator, and poet. She was born into a wealthy Madrid family of artists and writers. Her aunt was María Roësset Mosquera, a noted painter. She studied at the Ursulines, alongside her sister Marga. At the age of six she began to learn drawing and painting under José María López Mezquita.

In 1926, she married José María Franco Bordons, a musician and composer. After their marriage and having children, she went on to study at the Central University of Madrid (now Complutense University of Madrid) and received a PhD in literature, and was one of the few women to do so during this era.

== Career ==
After graduation, she began to teach English at Central University of Madrid, and translated several works from English and French. Shortly before the outbreak of the Spanish Civil War in 1936, Gil had moved to San Sebastián with her three children for the summer. There she collaborated on La Ametralladora and Pelayos, and she directed the magazine Mujer.

In 1938, together with the Catalan businessman Juan Baygual, she founded the magazine Chicos (magazine). In addition to directing Chicos, she also ran the sections for correspondence with readers, El Club de Chicos and Mis Chicas, using the pseudonyms L. de Villadiego and Madrina.

Gil then launched the publication Mis Chicas, the first magazine for girls after the war, as well as Chiquitito (1942) and El Gran Chicose (1945). In 1942, Gil created Editorial Gilsa (Consuelo Gil SA), a company that bought the magazine Chicos, and which managed the editions of many of these other publications.

She died on September 26, 1995, in Madrid at the age of 90.

== Publications ==
- Gil Roësset, Consuelo (1920). El Niño de Oro [The Golden Boy]. Marga Gil Roësset (illustrations). Madrid, Spain: Mateu.
- Gil Roësset, Consuelo (1923). Rose des Bois [Wood Rose]. Marga Gil Roësset (illustrations). Paris, France: Plon.
