= Margarita Gil Roësset =

Spanish sculptor (1908–1932)

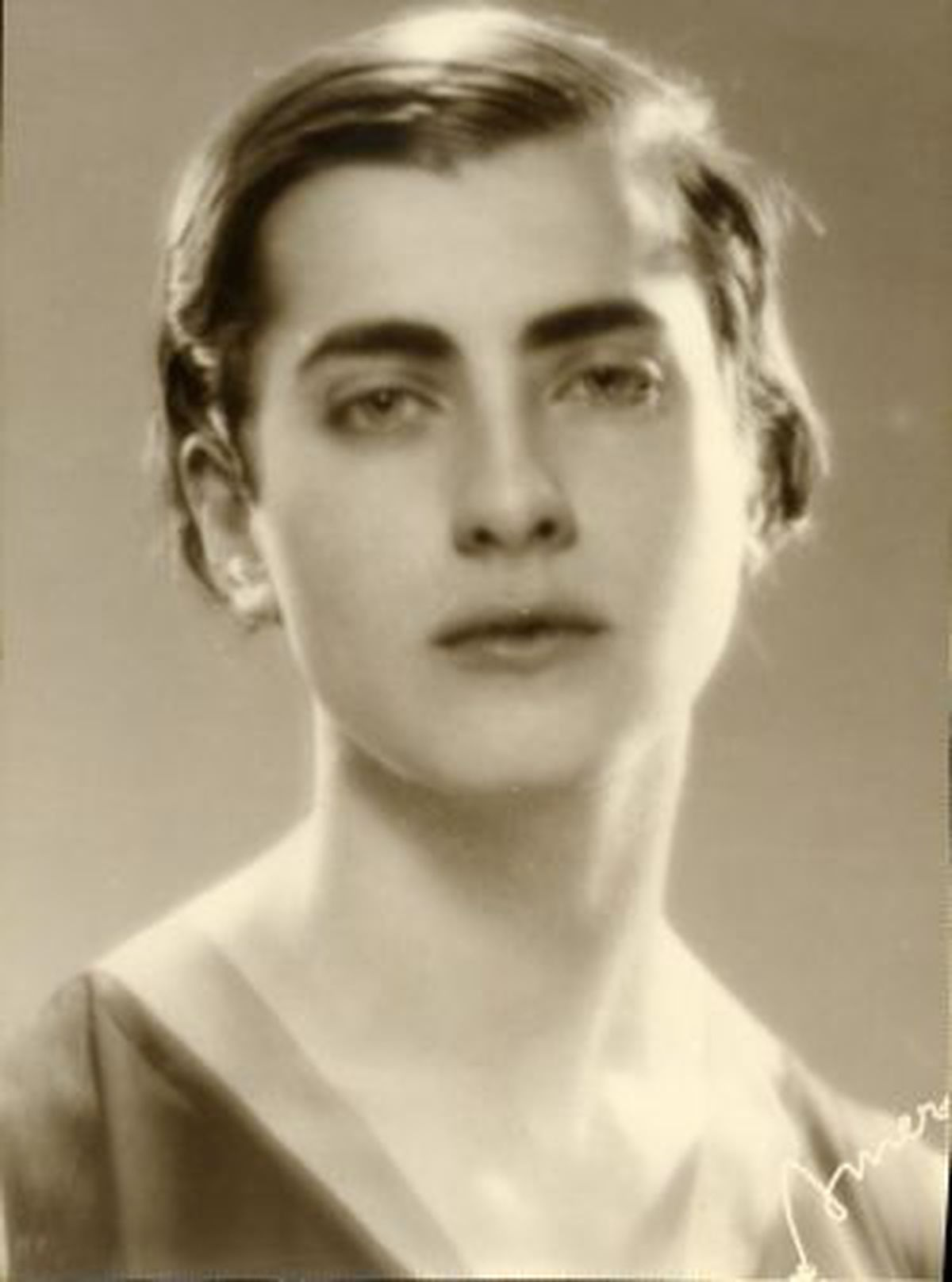
- Margarita Gil Roësset, 1932
- Born: 3 March 1908; Madrid, Spain
- Died: 28 July 1932 (age 24); Las Rozas de Madrid, Spain
- Other name: Marga Gil Roësset
- Occupations: Sculptor, illustrator, poet
- Movement: Art Nouveau, symbolism, expressionism
- Relatives: Consuelo Gil Roësset (sister), María Roësset Mosquera (aunt), Marisa Roësset Velasco (cousin)

Margarita Gil Roësset (3 March 1908 in Madrid – 28 July 1932 in Las Rozas) also known as Marga Gil Roësset, was a Spanish sculptor, illustrator, and poet. She is remembered for her sculptures in the genres of Art Nouveau, symbolism, and expressionism which were successfully exhibited at the National Exhibition of Fine Arts in Spain during her lifetime.

== Life and career ==
Margarita Gil Roësset was born on 3 March 1908, in Madrid, to parents Cecilia Margot Roësset Mosquera, and Julián Gil Clemente. Her birth was complicated and the doctors predicted a premature death, but her mother refused to let her second child die, and managed to keep her alive. She had three siblings. Her older sister was Spanish publisher Consuelo Gil Roësset, and her aunt was Spanish painter María Roësset Mosquera.

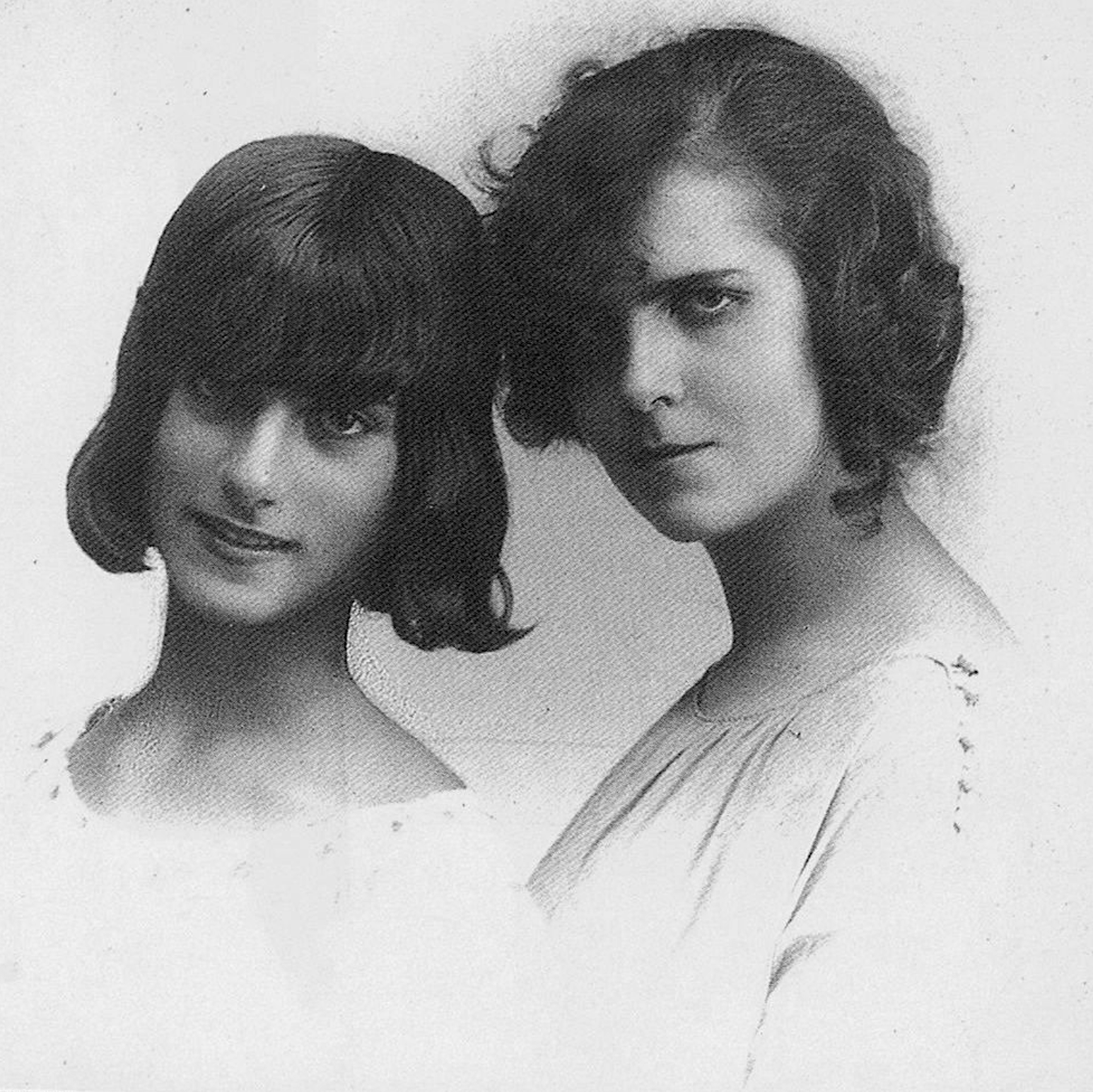
Consuelo (left) and Marga Gil Roësset

At age 7, she started drawing. In 1920, her sister Consuelo wrote El Niño de Oro (English: The Golden Boy), and it was illustrated by Margarita. In 1923, both sisters published another story, Rose des Bois (English: Wood Rose) in Paris. By age 15, Margarita improved her drawing skills and switched her focused towards sculpture.

Gil Roësset had been an admirer of Zenobia Camprubí, the Spanish writer of Catalan and Puerto Rican descent, who also translated works by Rabindranath Tagore. Camprubí was married to Spanish poet Juan Ramón Jiménez Mantecón, and together the couple attended Margarita Gil Roësset's opera recital in 1932 and they were introduced to Gil Roësset through a mutual friend. Gil Roësset decided to create a bust of Camprubí, and had also expressed feelings of love towards her husband Jiménez Mantecón in her diary.

She shot herself and died by suicide on 28 July 1932, in Las Rozas de Madrid at the age of 24. Before her death she gave letters to members of her family and to Jiménez Mantecón. Her private diary entries about Jiménez Mantecón were published in 1997.

== Publications ==
- Gil Roësset, Consuelo (1920). El Niño de Oro [The Golden Boy]. Marga Gil Roësset (illustrations). Madrid, Spain: Mateu.
- Gil Roësset, Consuelo (1923). Rose des Bois [Wood Rose]. Marga Gil Roësset (illustrations). Paris, France: Plon.
