= María Roësset Mosquera =

Portuguese-born Spanish painter (1882–1921)

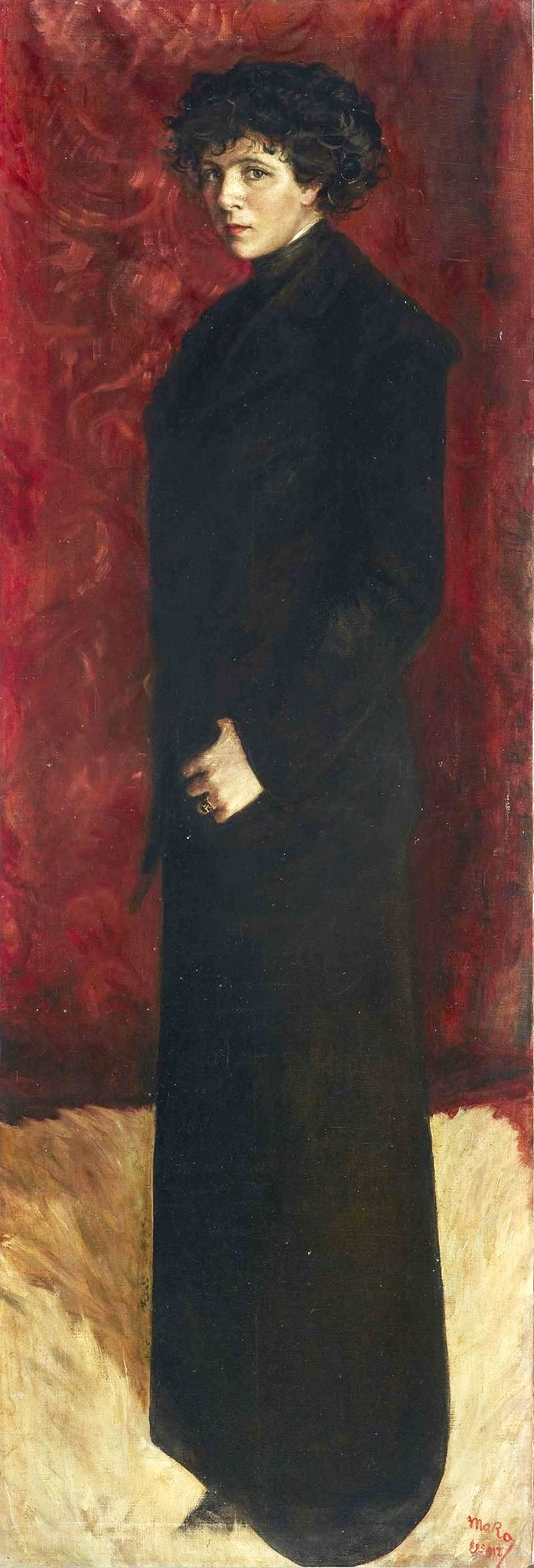
- Self-portrait (1921) by María Roësset Mosquera, at the Museo Nacional del Prado
- Born: María Eugenia Roësset Mosquera; November 21, 1882; Espinho, Portugal
- Died: October 3, 1921 (aged 38); Manila, Philippines
- Other names: Maria Roesset Mosquera, María Roësset–Mosquera, María Eugenia Soriano Roesset, María Eugenia Soriano–Roesset, MaRo
- Citizenship: Spain
- Occupation: Painter
- Years active: 1910–1921
- Spouse: Manuel Soriano Berrueta-Aldana (m. 1904–1910; his death)
- Children: 2
- Relatives: Margarita Gil Roësset (niece), Marisa Roësset Velasco (niece), Consuelo Gil Roësset (niece), Benito Soriano Murillo (father in-law)

María Eugenia Roësset Mosquera (November 21, 1882 – October 3, 1921) was a Portuguese-born Spanish painter, known for her portraits, and nudes. She was also known by the married name María Eugenia Soriano Roësset, María Roësset, and signed her paintings as MaRo.

== Early life and family ==
María Roësset Mosquera was born on November 21, 1882, in Espinho in Norte region of Portugal, to parents Eugenio Roësset Liot and Margarita Mosquera. She came from a French haute bourgeois family on her father's side, and was Galician on her mother's side. Her father was a civil engineer working in Portugal during her birth. In her childhood, the family moved to Madrid.

In 1904, she married Manuel Soriano Berrueta–Aldana (1863–1910), the son of the Spanish painter Benito Soriano Murillo. After the marriage, her husband encouraged her to start painting. In 1910, her husband died, leaving her as a young widow with two young children.

She was the aunt of the painter Marisa Roësset Velasco, the sculptor Margarita Gil Roësset, and the publisher Consuelo Gil Roësset.

== Career ==
The family moved out of the center of Madrid and for the next five months she focused on study painting by daily visits to the Museo del Prado and by taking classes at Eduardo Chicharro y Agüera's painting studio. Roësset Mosquera began traveling around Europe with her children to further study the art in the museums, and visited cities such as Munich, Düsseldorf, Rome, Florence and Vienna.

When World War I broke out in 1914, she returned to Spain, which was a neutral country. She acquired an illness in 1914, which worsened by 1915. It may have been tuberculosis. Despite her illness she continued to travel. On October 3, 1921, during a trip to Manila, Roësset Mosquera died at the age of 38.

Roësset Mosquera's work can be found in museums, including at the Museo de Bellas Artes de La Coruña in Galicia, Spain.

== Exhibitions ==
- 1912, Gitana Agustina, group exhibition, Munich, Germany
- 1914, Maja y Torero, group exhibition, Círculo de Bellas Artes, Madrid, Spain
