= Irene Polo =

Spanish journalist, publicist, and translator

Irene Polo Roig
- fair use image
- Born: Irene Polo Roig; 27 November 1909; Barcelona, Spain
- Died: 3 April 1942 (aged 32); Buenos Aires, Argentina
- Occupations: journalist, publicist, theater representative, translator
- Writing career
- Language: Catalan, Spanish

Irene Polo Roig (27 November 1909 – 3 April 1942) was a Catalan journalist, publicist, theater representative, and translator. She was one of the first women journalists in the Catalan press. Polo, who favored labor rights, participated in the creation of "l'Agrupació Professional de Periodistes" (Association of Professional Journalists). Because of the Spanish Civil War, she lived the last three years of her life in exile in Buenos Aires, where she committed suicide at the age of 32.

== Early years and education ==
Irene Polo Roig was born in Barcelona, 27 November 1909. Her father, Antonio Polo, a policeman, died young. Her mother was Francisca Roig. Like many other women of the time, Polo did not have easy access to education or university studies, and had to learn on her own.

== Career ==
Before she made a career in journalism, she worked as head of publicity for the film production company Gaumont. Polo began her journalism career with the magazine Mirador in 1930, and worked professionally in Barcelona until 1936. The articles published during those years in Imatges, La Humanitat, La Rambla, L'Opinió, L'Instant, and Última Hora are characterized as an ironic and brilliant testimony of the society and politics of that time. There were articles on fashion, such as the introduction of women's trousers and the appearance of the neckline, to reports of denunciation of social life, begging in Barcelona, the poor living conditions of workers and immigrants, and political alertness, including the story in which she pretends to be a follower of the National Action Youth or the articles devoted to censorship, when she herself was a victim. As a special envoy, she reported on events such as the trial in Madrid of the Catalan Government for the events of October 1934, or the revolutionary strikes in the mines of Sallent and Súria. Polo favored labor right, and in the previous year, she participated in the creation of "l'Agrupació Professional de Periodistes" (Association of Professional Journalists).

In 1936, Polo went to the United States, as a representative of Margarita Xirgu's theatrical company. When the company was dissolved in 1939, Polo could not return to Barcelona because of the Spanish Civil War. Instead, she lived in exile in Buenos Aires with her mother and sisters, who were able to flee the war. There, she worked as a French and English language translator for the publishers, Losada and Sopena, and she served as advertising director for Dana perfumeries, a job she did not like because of the long hours. Polo fell into depression because her love for Xirgu was not reciprocated, and committed suicide at the age of 32, in Buenos Aires, 3 April 1942.

== Bibliography ==
- Polo, Irene; Santa-Maria, Glòria (2003). La fascinació del periodisme: cròniques (1930 - 1936). D'un dia a l'altre (in Catalan) (1st ed.). Barcelona: Quaderns Crema. ISBN 978-84-7727-389-9.
- Polo, Irene (2018). Anna Crespo (ed.). Irene Polo, una reportera excepcional: recull dʼarticles (1930-1938) (in Catalan). La Mar de Fàcil. ISBN 978-8494704277.
