= Marisa Roësset Velasco =

Spanish painter (1904–1976)

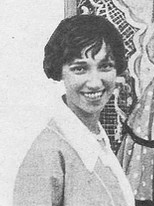
- Born: Marisa Luisa Roësset y Velasco; March 6, 1904; Madrid, Spain
- Died: November 18, 1976 (aged 72); Madrid, Spain
- Burial place: Saint Isidore Cemetery, Madrid, Spain
- Other names: Marisa Roesset, Marisa Roesset Velasco, Marisa Roesset y Velasco
- Education: Real Academia de Bellas Artes de San Fernando
- Occupations: Painter, teacher, school founder
- Partner: Lola Rodríguez Aragón
- Relatives: María Roësset Mosquera (paternal aunt), Rosario de Velasco (maternal cousin), Margarita Gil Roësset (paternal cousin), Consuelo Gil (paternal cousin)

Marisa Roësset Velasco (née Marisa Luisa Roësset y Velasco; March 6, 1904 – November 18, 1976) was a Spanish figurative painter, and teacher. She worked on portraits, genre scenes, and religious scenes; and founded a painting school in Madrid that operated for 30 years.

== Life and career ==
Marisa Roësset Velasco was born on March 6, 1904, in Madrid, to father Eugenio Julio Roësset Mosquera. She was born into a wealthy Madrid family of artists and writers.

Her aunt was painter María Roësset Mosquera, whom she studied painting under in early life. Roësset Velasco attended Real Academia de Bellas Artes de San Fernando in Madrid, and studied under teachers Daniel Vázquez Díaz, Fernando Álvarez de Sotomayor, and José María López Mezquita. She attended art school classes alongside Salvador Dalí, and Victorina Durán.

She became known as a painter through her exhibitions at the Lyceum Club Femenino, despite not holding a membership. In the 1930s, Roësset Velasco opened a painting school in Madrid, that was active for 30 years. Menchu Gal had been one of her students.

Roësset Velasco discreetly had a lesbian relationship with the teacher at the Madrid Singing School, Lola Rodríguez Aragón, with whom she lived and to whom she left her pictorial work upon her death.

Roësset Velasco died of cancer on November 18, 1976, in Madrid.

== Exhibitions ==
- 1924, Exposición Nacional de Bellas Artes, group exhibition, Madrid, Spain
- 1929 Barcelona International Exposition, Barcelona, Spain
- 1931, Círculo de Bellas Artes, Madrid, Spain
- 1941, Círculo de Bellas Artes, Madrid, Spain
