= Victorina Durán =

Spanish painter

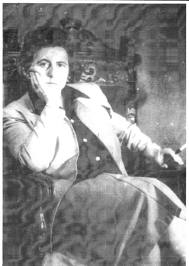
- Born: Victorina Durán Cebrián; 11 December 1899; Madrid, Spain
- Died: 10 December 1993 (aged 93); Madrid, Spain
- Education: Real Academia de Bellas Artes de San Fernando
- Occupations: Artist, set designer, costume designer

Victorina Durán Cebrián (11 December 1899 – 10 December 1993) was a Spanish set and costume designer, chair of costumes and scenography at the National Conservatory, and avant-garde artist associated with the surrealist movement of the 1920s and 30s. After going into exile in Argentina, she became director of the Teatro Colón in Buenos Aires.

== Early life and education ==
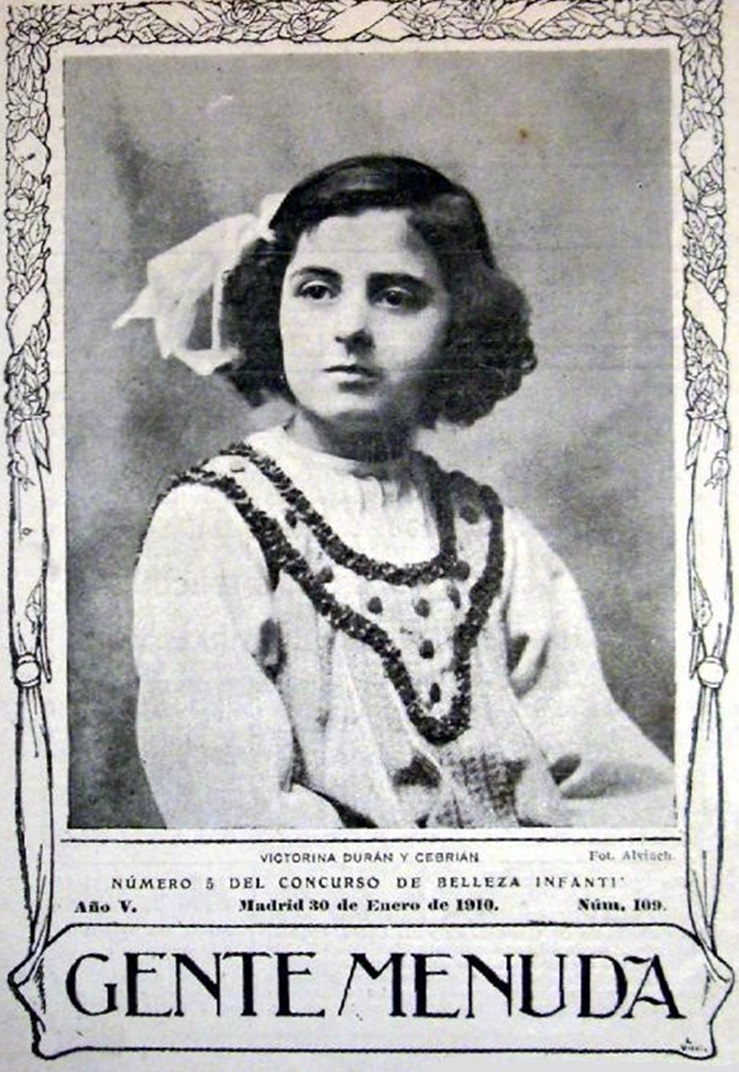
Victorina Durán in 1910

Born into a bourgeois, traditionalist, and cultured family – owners of the Teatro Real's number 1 season ticket – Victorina Durán was the daughter of a dancer of that theater and a career soldier. When her desire to be an actress was rejected by the family, she consoled herself with studying drawing and painting. That led her to meet and interact with characters such as Salvador Dalí, Remedios Varo, Maruja Mallo, and Rosa Chacel. After completing her studies at the Real Academia de Bellas Artes de San Fernando in Madrid from 1917 to 1926, in 1929 she won the Chair of Costumes and Scenographic Art, becoming the first woman to obtain this position in Spain.

== Career ==
Durán had previously distinguished herself as a batik artist, forming part of the Spanish delegation at the International Exhibition of Modern Decorative and Industrial Arts of Paris in 1925. A year later she was part of the group of intellectual women and artists gathered by Maria de Maeztu to found the Lyceum Club (within which she was a key player in the development of the Sapphic Circle of Madrid).

Durán and Matilde Calvo Rodero lived together, traveled together, shared a studio on Ventura de Vega Street, and collaborated on projects. Durán also worked with Rivas Cherif on the creation of the Theater School of Art (TEA) in Madrid, and made costumes and sets for the companies of Margarita Xirgu, Federico García Lorca, and Irene López Heredia. She also made sets and decorations for films such as Blood Wedding.

As a decorator and scenographer in 1930s Spain, Durán freed herself from the "archeology of the naturalist school", creating an innovative blend of "avant-garde and popular costumbrismo". She wrote about her renovating aesthetic ideas in a series of articles published in the newspapers La Voz and La Libertad from 1935 to 1936 under the title Escenografía y vestuario (Scenography and Costumes).

After the Spanish Civil War erupted, in 1937 she accompanied Margarita Xirgu in her American exile and took up residence in Argentina. In that country, she simultaneously played the role of artistic director of the Colón and Cervantes theaters. In collaboration with Susana Aquino she inspired the creation of La Cuarta Carabela, the Spanish Association of Seven Arts, the Indigenous Theater Group, and worked as a costume designer with the choreographer Mercedes Quintana. As a painter she exhibited in countries such as Uruguay, Brazil, Chile, Germany, and France.

She broke her exile in 1949 to collaborate with Dalí on the Don Juan Tenorio directed by Luis Escobar Kirkpatrick at the National Theater of Spain. From then on, she traveled frequently to Europe – especially Paris and Madrid – and in the 1980s she settled permanently in the Spanish capital.

== Death and legacy ==
She died in Madrid at age 93. Her epitaph contains the following caption: "I do not know if I will have stopped loving for having died, or I will have died for having stopped loving." In her memoirs, she expressed her "passionate militancy in lesbianism in the context of a stale and intolerant Spain."

The life and work of Victorina Durán has been the subject of study. Eva María Moreno Lago presented the doctoral thesis Victorina Durán escritora y artista del teatro de vanguardia at the University of Seville in 2018.
