= Pilar de Zubiaurre =

Basque intellectual, writer, pianist, art dealer and manager

- Born: Pilar de Zubiaurre; 1884; Garai, Basque Country, Spain
- Died: 1970 (aged 85–86); Mexico City, Mexico
- Occupations: writer, art dealer
- Spouse: Ricardo Gutiérrez Abascal "Juan de la Encina"
- Children: Leopoldo Gutiérrez
- Writing career
- Language: Spanish
- Movement: Feminist

Pilar de Zubiaurre (1884–1970) was a Basque intellectual, writer, pianist, art dealer and manager. She lived in exile in Mexico for more than thirty years as a consequence of the Spanish Civil War. Zubiaurre was born to a well-off family. Her father, Valentín María de Zubiaurre, was maestro of the Spanish royal choir, while her brothers Ramón and Valentín de Zubiaurre, were famous painters who held exhibitions throughout the world. Zubiaurre was married to Ricardo Gutiérrez Abascal, a famous art critic known under the pseudonym of "Juan de la Encina".

== Life and cultural activities ==
Zubiaurre was born in 1884 in Garai. She played an active role in the culture of Spain during the 1910s–1930s. This is why Iker González-Allende, editor of her works, calls her "woman of the Generation of '98" and "modern woman". Zubiaurre was one of the promoters of the magazine Hermes: Revista del País Vasco (1917–1922). During the 1910s she organized cultural gatherings in the painting studio her brothers had in Madrid. These gatherings, called "the Saturdays of the Zubiaurres", were attended by some of the most relevant intellectuals and artists of that time, such as Manuel de Falla, José Ortega y Gasset, Diego Rivera and Juan Ramón Jiménez. Zubiaurre was also the manager of her two deaf brothers, whose paintings she helped to sell and promote by organizing international exhibitions. She also participated in the founding and development of the Lyceum Club Femenino, the first female cultural association in Spain, chaired by María de Maeztu. In fact, she held the position of director of the Lyceum's Literature Section from 1928 until 1932, organizing public presentations by Spanish and foreign intellectuals. In the Lyceum, she became close friends with women authors including Ernestina de Champourcín and Concha Méndez. She was also friends with Federico García Lorca, who dedicated her his poem entitled "Tres ciudades" ("Three Cities").

During the Spanish Civil War, Zubiaurre and her husband followed the democratic Republican Government to Valencia, where they stayed in the Casa de la Cultura (The Culture House) with other leftist intellectuals. She left Spain thanks to Lázaro Cárdenas, president of Mexico, who offered her husband and other Spanish intellectuals positions in the cultural institution La Casa de España, later called El Colegio de México. On her way to exile, Zubiaurre decided to spend nine days in New York, where, accompanied by Zenobia Camprubí and Juan Ramón Jiménez, she visited several sites of interest such as the Hispanic Society of America and Columbia University. Zubiaurre returned to Spain in 1951 and later on, in 1955, she traveled to Spain with her husband. Since 1964, Zubiaurre traveled to Spain once a year, until she died on 24 June 1970 in Mexico.

== Works ==
Zubiaurre published several articles in magazines and newspapers. In 1909, she published a few articles promoting the importance of the arts in the Basque nationalist newspaper Bizkaitarra under the pseudonym of "Hulda de Garay". She also published 16 articles in the magazine Euzko Deya: La voz de los vascos en México between 1944 and 1958 using the pseudonym of "Landabarrenako Damia" ("The Lady of Landabarrena", name of her family country house in the Basque Country). The title of Zubiaurre's section in Euzko Deya, "Evocación," suggests the nature of the articles. In all of them, the author recalls nostalgically the landscape, customs, and people she left behind in the Basque Country. Zubiaurre also wrote a diary between 1913 and 1943, where she shows her active cultural life, her support to the Spanish Second Republic, her leftist and Basque nationalist political views during the Spanish Civil War, and her suffering during exile. Zubiaurre's articles and diary were collected by Iker González-Allende in a book titled Evocaciones: Artículos y diario (1909–1958).

Zubiaurre also kept a large epistolary correspondence throughout her life, most of which is preserved in the Archive of the Museum of Fine Arts in Bilbao, Spain. This correspondence has been published in the book Epistolario de Pilar de Zubiaurre (1906–1970) (Tamesis, 2014), which collects 188 letters that she wrote and mostly received from writers and artists such as Azorín, Gabriel Miró, José de Togores and Concha Méndez. In these letters, we witness the active Spanish cultural life during the 1920s and 1930s. The letters written during the Spanish Civil War show the leftist intellectuals' efforts to promote their political ideas against the Francoist forces, as well as the difficulties of daily life. The letters during exile, written by female friends such as Zenobia Camprubí and María Martos de Baeza, illustrate how women in exile kept alive the memory of the Spanish Second Republic and built communicative bridges between Spain and the exile communities in America.

== Publications ==
- Evocaciones. Artículos y diario (1909–1958). Edited by Iker González-Allende. San Sebastián: Saturraran, 2009.
- Epistolario de Pilar de Zubiaurre (1906–1970). Edited by Iker González-Allende. Woodbridge: Tamesis, 2014. Table of Contents

== See also ==
- Ricardo Gutiérrez Abascal

== Sources ==
- Iker González-Allende: "Pilar de Zubiaurre: entre el cometa y la sombra". In Non zeuden emakumeak? La mujer vasca en el exilio de 1936. Ed. José Ramón Zabala. San Sebastián: Saturraran, 2007, pp. 409–437.
- Iker González-Allende: "El adiós del exiliado: Las rutas de la memoria en Pilar de Zubiaurre." In El exilio republicano de 1939 y la segunda generación. Ed. Manuel Aznar Soler and José Ramón López García. Seville: Renacimiento, 2012, pages 1052–1058.
- Iker González-Allende: "Women’s Exile and Transatlantic Epistolary Ties in the Work of Pilar de Zubiaurre." In Hispania: A Journal devoted to the teaching of Spanish and Portuguese 95.2 (2012), pp. 211–26.
