= Rosa Maria Arquimbau =

Spanish feminist writer and journalist

- Born: 27 March 1909; Barcelona, Spain
- Died: 28 February 1992 (aged 82); Barcelona, Spain
- Citizenship: Spain
- Occupations: Catalan writer, journalist, feminist, and suffragist
- Writing career
- Pen name: Rosa de Sant Jordi
- Language: Catalan
- Genres: short stories, novels, dramas, comedies, essays, and poetry
- Notable works: Tres contes breus (1928); La dona dels ulls que parlaven i altres contes (1930); Al marge (1931); Història d'una noia i vint braçalets (1934); Home i Dona (1936); La pau és un interval (1970); Quaranta anys perduts (1971)
- Notable awards: Premio Joan de Santa Maria in 1957

Rosa Maria Arquimbau i Cardil (pen name, Rosa de Sant Jordi; 27 March 1909 – 28 February 1992) was a Catalan writer, journalist, feminist, and suffragist. Together with Maria Teresa Vernet i Real, Carme Montoriol i Puig, Anna Murià, Elvira Augusta Lewi, Aurora Bertrana, and Mercè Rodoreda, Arquimbau was considered a model of the "femme de lettres" and one of the six major female Catalan novelists of the 1930s. Her novels and plays, which depicted modern life subjects, earned "critical and popular success". While they were characterized as vivid and sometimes poignant, they were also criticized as trivial and frivolous.

== Biography ==
Born in Barcelona, Arquimbau was a relevant Catalan female activist, journalist and writer whose genres included short stories, novels, dramas, comedies, essays, and poetry. Her short stories were first published when she was a teenager. The humor in her comedies is described as ironic and situational.

During the period of 1924-36, she worked at almost all of the daily and weekly newspapers of the left: Joventut Catalana, La Dona Catalana, Flames Noves, La Nau, Imatges, La Publicitat, l'Opinió, and La Humanitat. She wrote a column in La Rambla, called "Films & Soda", her comments, often laced with irony, depicting the changes women face. Writing on topics such as secularism, the death penalty, fashion, women's prisons, politics, morality, and Mussolini antifeminism, her articles often caused controversy with more conservative newspapers.

Arquimbau was a political activist. In 1932, she signed the Bases per a la Constitució d’un Front Únic Femení Esquerrista, participating in the campaign to collect signatures in favor of women's suffrage. She was president of the "Front Únic Femení Esquerrista" (United Front of Women from the Left), as well as a member of the Republican Left of Catalonia. She was associated with the Club Femení i d’Esports de Barcelona i al Lyceum Club, Associació de Periodistes de Barcelona and Foment de Cultura Femenina.

Of her honors, Arquimbau received the Premio Joan de Santa Maria in 1957. She died in Barcelona in 1991.

== Selected works ==
=== Novels and short stories ===
- Tres contes breus (1928)
- La dona dels ulls que parlaven i altres contes (1930)
- Al marge (1931)
- Història d'una noia i vint braçalets (1934)
- Home i Dona (1936)
- La pau és un interval (1970)
- Quaranta anys perduts (1971)
- Adéu si te’n vas (unpublished; 1934)

=== Plays ===
- Es rifa un home! Apunt satíric en un acte, obra publicada a La Escena Catalana (1935)
- Amunt i crits (1936)
- Les dones sàvies (1936)
- Maria la Roja (1938)
- L'inconvenient de dir-se Martines (1957)
- Per la pàtria, (unpublished; 1926)
- Flors de cim (unpublished, 1926)
- Estimat Mohamed: dos actes de comèdia, cada un dividit en dos quadres (unpublished; 1980)
