= Pere Puig Subinyà =

Pere Puig Subinyà (Sant Hipòlit de Voltregà, Spain 1914 – La Paz, Bolivia 1999) was a Catalan politician and businessman. He was a member of Unió de Rabassaires and Republican Left of Catalonia (Catalan: Esquerra Republicana de Catalunya)

== Biography ==
=== Second Republic and Spanish Civil War ===
He was mayor of the municipality of Sant Hipòlit de Voltregà from 4 September 1936 until 17 February 1937 for the Unió de Rabassaires of Catalunya.

He was a councillor of the municipality of Barcelona in the consistory of Carles Pi i Sunyer, and soon after he took charge of the supplies council of that municipality.

He actively participated in the events of October 1934 (the 1934 revolution in Spain - in Barcelona, the government of the Generalitat of Catalonia, chaired by Lluís Companys from Republican Left of Catalonia, proclaimed the Catalan State within a non existent Federal Spanish Republic in the night of 6 October), for which he was subjected to martial court.

When the Spanish Civil War broke out, he joined the army and asked to be sent to the front as a soldier. He enrolled in the column of Macias-Companys and he was the political commissar from the Catalan Republican parties that reached the highest rank, finally ascending to colonel.

His ideological fervor created him bitter enemies amongst communist elements, which largely dominated the army. In December 1938 he issued a report to the standing committee of his party, Republican Left of Catalonia, as Deputy Commissioner Brigadier, occupying the position of commissioner of the 62nd division, part of the XXIV corps. This report sought to picture the political composition of the authorities of the Spanish Republican Army. The predominant complaint on it was that the percentage of chiefs, officers and commissioners who had communist sympathies, or were members of the Communist Party of Spain, was very high: up to 50 percent, and this high percentage could negatively affect the morale of Republican soldiers of the Spanish Republican Army. Following this report, which was distributed among Communists and others, he was accused in 1939 of high treason against the Republic, being detained for 12 days and released after in Arenys de Munt.

=== Exile ===
For that reason, with the support of his party he went to France, where he stayed as a refugee in the internment camps, first in Argelès and after in Agde. From his time in these camps Anna Murià (wife of Agustí Bartra) wrote in her biographical notes on Bartra: "Pere Puig was a leader, mentor and protector, brother and father of the Catalans in the concentration camps. He understood everyone and cared about everyone". During this stage he maintained frequent communication with Carles Pi i Sunyer. Thereafter he went to Montpellier and stayed in the residence of his party. In the early years of the exile in France he was one of the most important leaders of Republican Left of Catalonia.

On 20 August 1944 he entered Barcelona clandestinely with his wife (Montserrat Puig Torrents- “a modern young woman with very clear ideas”), as the first representative of the leadership of Republican Left of Catalonia in exile in Paris, under the chairmanship of Josep Irla. His mission was to reorganize the internal leadership of the party and to form a unity government of the Generalitat. He adopted the clandestine names of Esteve Serra or Esteve Serrallonga Mono. During this period he was also in charge of the organization and propaganda of Republican Left of Catalonia, and of the publication of the clandestine journal "La Humanitat". Furthermore, he was responsible for and director of the internal party newsletters "Butlletí" and "Butlletí d´Informació", in the edition of which his wife also actively participated.

On 24 January 1947 he was arrested by Francisco Franco´s police and escaped. Some characters of the time consider this escape was facilitated by the police due to the pressure they were receiving from the civil governor, the consuls of the foreign democratic powers (which kept conversations and relationships with Republican Left of Catalonia) and other Catalan personalities such as Jose Maria Pi i Sunyer, Dean of the Faculty of Law of the University of Barcelona.

He entered again clandestinely in Barcelona several times in 1947, to take over the party’s crisis and to connect with Pous i Pages and the National Council of Catalan Democracy (in Catalan: Consell Nacional de la Democràcia Catalana). His task was to redirect the existing difficult relationship between the Council and the government in exile, and between the Council and Republican Left of Catalonia. Moreover, he represented President Josep Irla to see the possibilities of creation of a unity organism of the inside Catalan political forces, contrary to Francisco Franco´s regime, and to connect them with the government of Catalonia. To this end he held several meetings and interviews.

He was in charge of the information service of the Generalitat of Catalonia in exile (1947–49).

In 1949 he left to Bolivia, where he held various management positions in private companies, founding also his own. In this country he was president of the Association of Spanish (1953-1959) an apolitical institution of Cochabamba, and member of social and economic institutions such as the House of Spain and the Spanish Chamber of Commerce in Bolivia, of this last one for a period of eighteen years of which six (1978-1984) he was president.

During his exile he wrote several articles in the Catalan newspaper Avui.

In 1983 he was appointed Commander of the Order of Civil Merit by His Majesty King Juan Carlos I of Spain for his full support for the work of rapprochement between Spain and Bolivia.

The character Puig of the book "Xabola" of Agustí Bartra is Pere Puig.

== Bibliography ==
- La humanitat. Number 626. November 14, 1933
- Molas i Batllori, Isidre, Diccionari dels partits politics de Catalunya segle XX (Spain, Enciclopedia Catalana, 2000) Page 78. ISBN 8441204667
- Pi i Sunyer, Carles, 1939: Memories Del Primer Exili (Spain, Fundacio Carles Pi i Sunyer d'Estudis Autonomics i Locals, 2000) ISBN 8495417065
- Pi i Sunyer, Carles, Memories De L'Exili, El Govern De La Generalitat Paris 1945-1948 (Spain, Curial, 1979). ASIN B000YSH0ZG
- Puig, Pere, Informe sobre el ejercito. December 1938. Biblioteca Pavelló de la Republica, Universidad de Barcelona.
- Quaderns de l´Arxiu Pi i Sunyer. Number 3: Des dels camps. Cartes de rufiagts i internats al migdia francés l´any 1939. ( Fundación Carles Pi I Sunyer, 1998). ISSN 1139-0204 http://pisunyer.org/arxiu-historic/publicacions/quaderns-de-larxiu-pi-i-sunyer/3-des-dels-camps-cartes-de-refugiats-i-internats-al-migdia
- Subirats Piñana, Josep, Entre vivencias. (Spain, Viena, 2010). ISBN 8483302020
- Viladot i Presas, Albert. Nacionalisme i prensa clandestina (1939-1951) (Spain, Curial, 1987). ISBN 8472562867
- Vilanova i Vila-Abadal, Francesc, Als dos costats de la frontera. Relacions politiques entre exili i interior a la postguerra, 1939-1948. (Spain, Publicacions de l´Abadia de Montserrat, 2001) ISBN 8484152650
