= Lyceum Club Femenino =

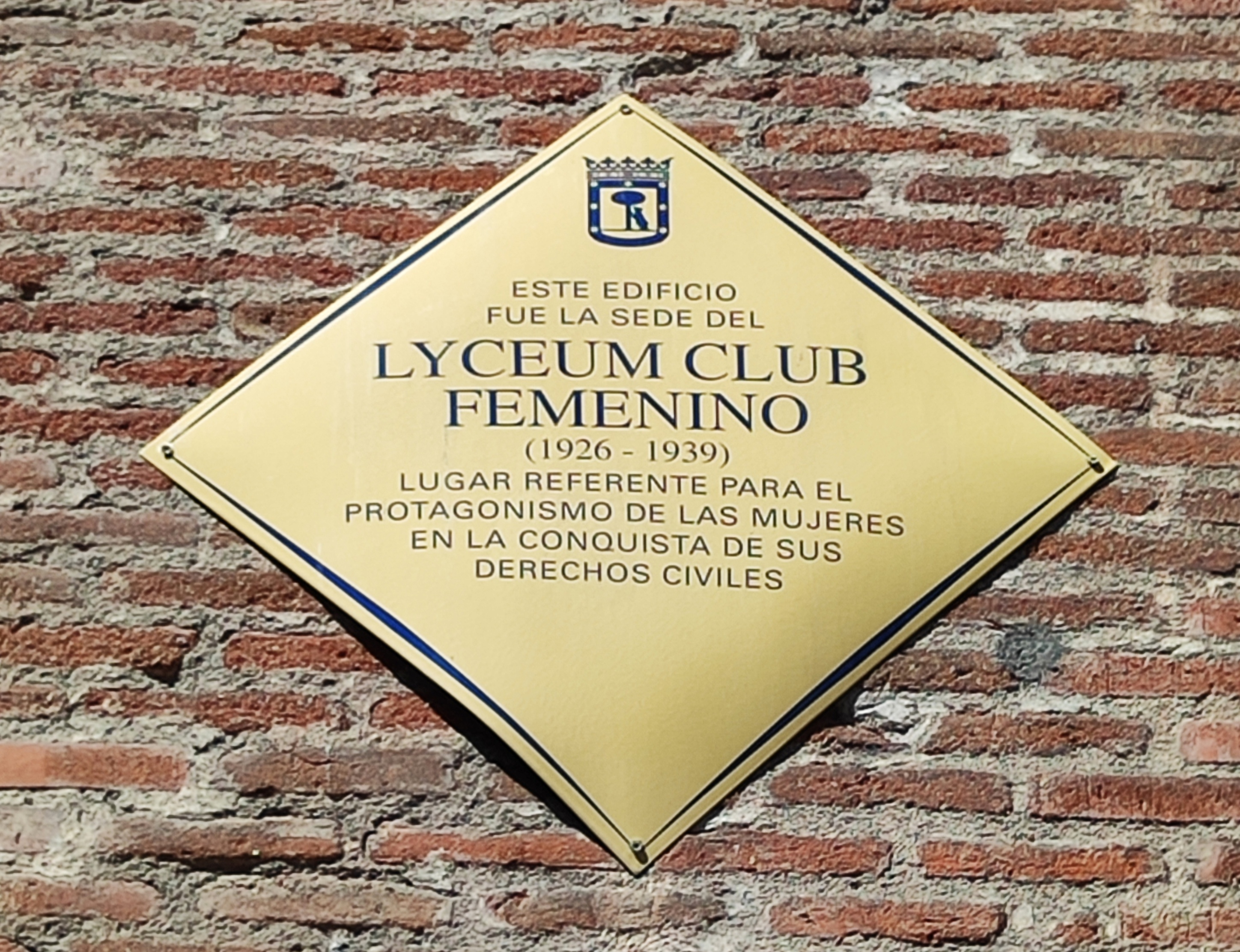
- commemorative plaque
- Successor: "Medina Club," run by the Sección Femenina
- Formation: 1926
- Founder: María de Maeztu
- Dissolved: 1939
- Purpose: provide a meeting place; defend women's interests; promote their educational, cultural, and professional development; facilitate the organization of social projects
- Headquarters: House of the Seven Chimneys
- Location: Madrid, Spain

Lyceum Club Femenino was a Spanish women's association that operated in Madrid between 1926 and 1939. Among its significant number of members, its founder and president, María de Maeztu, stands out. It had its first headquarters in Madrid's House of the Seven Chimneys.

== International background ==
The association was founded in 1926 by approximately 100 women from intellectual cultural circles, following the example of the first lyceum created in 1904 in London by the British writer Constance Smedley. The Lyceum's objective was to defend women's interests, while providing a meeting place and promoting their educational, cultural, and professional development, as well as facilitating the organization of social projects. Similar clubs soon sprang up in Berlin, Paris, Brussels, New York City, Rome, The Hague, and other cities around the world. An international federation of these organizations was organized in 1908. The club was non-denominational and apolitical, and membership was restricted to women who had performed literary, artistic, or scientific work, participated in social causes, or held academic degrees.

== Constitution in Spain ==
Although some co-founders advocated for a mixed-gender club from the beginning, it ultimately became a women-only space. Men's participation was restricted to attending lectures and sitting in the tea room. It was based on the London Statutes, which were approved by the members.

The Spanish club was made up of women from the country's sociocultural elite who, due to their family environment, had a high level of education, an interest in culture, and time to pursue activities. At the time of its founding, this association had 115 members. It was also called "the wives' club" because several wives of prominent figures of the time, especially those from the intellectual elite, met there.

It had sections for Literature, Music, Visual and Industrial Arts, International Studies, Latin American Studies, Sciences, and Social Studies. The club's general objectives were to defend the moral and material interests of women, developing economic, scientific, and artistic initiatives; fostering a collective spirit, facilitating the exchange of ideas and the understanding of feelings; organizing social events, holding conferences, and so on.

In 1931, the Lyceum Club Barcelona was created, becoming a meeting place for prominent Catalan writers such as Aurora Bertrana and Carmen Montoriol Puig.

== Organization ==
=== Board ===
The presidency was held by María de Maeztu. The vice-presidents were Victoria Kent and Isabel Oyarzábal. Zenobia Camprubí served as secretary. Amalia Galárraga was the treasurer, Helen Phillips as vice-secretary, and María Martos as librarian. Margarita Nelken, María Lejárraga, Carmen Baroja, Ernestina de Champourcín, Concha Méndez, María Teresa León, Elena Fortún, and Mabel Rick Pérez de Ayala also participated. The honorary presidency was held by Queen Victoria Eugenia and the Duchess of Alba.

=== Members ===
By 1927, a year after its founding, the number of female members had increased fivefold. Membership in the club was not restricted on ideological grounds. Women could become members if they had completed higher education or if they had distinguished themselves as writers, artists, or intellectuals. Those who had participated in social work were also eligible. Since access to education was effectively limited to people of the middle and upper classes, this group predominated in the club. Among the members, there were also no restrictions based on marital status or sexual orientation, and some openly lesbian women, such as Victorina Durán, were included. In 1930, out of nearly 500 members, 475 were married.

Others associated with the Lyceum Club were Matilde Calvo Rodero, Clara Campoamor, Matilde Huici, María Luisa Navarro Margati, Rosario Lacy, Pura Maortua, Carmen Gallardo Martín-Gamero, María del Mar Terrones Villanueva, Carmen Monné, María Francisca Clar Margarit, Julia Iruretagoiena, Rosa Spottorno Topete, Matilde Muñoz Barberi, and the pediatrician Nieves González Barrio.

Among these women were some members of the Generation of '27, such as Ernestina de Champourcín, Teresa León, and Concha Méndez, also known by the collective name Las Sinsombrero.

== Activities ==
Courses, lectures, concerts, and exhibitions were organized, led by intellectuals, scientists, and national and international artists. In 1932, Federico García Lorca read his unpublished book, Poet in New York, and gave a lecture in the halls entitled "Imaginación, inspiración y evasión en poesía" (Imagination, inspiration, and evasion in poetry). Miguel de Unamuno also read his play Raquel encadenada (Rachel in chains). Rafael Alberti was more controversial with his performance "Palomita y galapago - No más arthriticos!" (Palomita and Galapago - No more arthritics!), surprising some, scandalizing others, and entertaining yet another. Jacinto Benavente, on the day he was invited to give a lecture at the Lyceum, said: "I don't like to talk nonsense." For her part, Carmen Monné, Ricardo Baroja's wife, organized fundraising performances and raffles for paintings in her chamber theater, "El mirlo blanco" (The white blackbird). Some of the most significant activities were the short courses and legal seminars taught by Victoria Kent, Matilde Huici, and Clara Campoamor, which served to analyze the situation of women in the Civil and Penal Code, and subsequently present reform proposals to the government.

Another interesting initiative was the "Casa de los Niños" (Children's house), a free educational institution for children of working women that began in 1929, as well as the talks and conferences organized on topics of cultural and legal interest, open to the entire society, which were very successful.

== Closure and legacy ==
With the outbreak of the Spanish Civil War and the defeat and exile of the Republic in 1939, the Lyceum was dismantled and became the "Medina Club," run by the Sección Femenina.

In 2017, a tribute was paid by the City Council of Madrid and the Ministry of Education, Culture, and Sport with a commemorative plaque at the House of the Seven Chimneys, on the occasion of the 90th anniversary of the Lyceum's founding. This tribute was proposed in 2014 by the associations Clásicas y Modernas, Asociación de Mujeres en las Artes Visuales, Asociación de mujeres cineastas y de medios audiovisuales, Asociación de Mujeres Investigadoras y Tecnólogas, and the association of architects "La Mujer Construye".

In 2018, the three-act play "El club de las maridas" (The club of the couples) was performed by Mujeres Vecinales.
