= Bartra =

Bartra is a Catalan surname. Notable people with the surname include:

- Agustí Bartra (1908–1982), Catalan poet, writer, and translator
- Marc Bartra (born 1991), Spanish footballer
- Roger Bartra (born 1942), Mexican sociologist and anthropologist
