= Antònia Abelló =

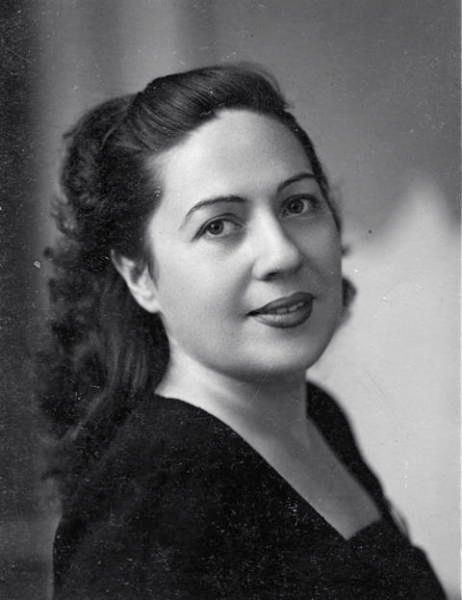
Antònia Abelló (1920s)

Antònia Abelló Filella (pseudonyms, Colombina, Pepeta Roig, and Sònia; Reus, 12 September 1913 - Reus, 12 March 1984) was a Spanish political activist, republican journalist and feminist also known as a pianist and writer.

== Career ==
In 1932, she was a member of the Foment Nacionalista Republicà (Republican Nationalist Development). In her literary work, she wrote for Feminal, Foment, La Dona Catalana, and La Jornada. In the magazine Estudis, she signed under the pseudonym "Sònia". In her articles and short stories, Abelló defended the role of women in the new republican society, and defined her with her own ideas, as being cultured, active and sporty. Abello foresaw the pitfalls in her writings.

She worked as a journalist with accreditation and card from the Association of Journalists of Reus, the first woman to obtain it. During these years, the Reus City Council gave her a scholarship to study music at the Conservatori Superior de Música del Liceu and she excelled as a pianist. In 1935, she dedicated himself to teaching music and piano in Reus. In 1936, she started working at the Department of Labor of the Generalitat de Catalunya. She belonged to the Unió de Dones de Catalunya; created in 1937, it was a group of anti-fascist women that brought together women of various ideologies. During the Spanish Civil War, she wrote for Setmanari Abril, in Barcelona.

In 1939, she was the victim of denunciation, tried and convicted in a council of war by the Francoists and imprisoned until 1941 in the Convent of the Oblates in Tarragona, converted into a women's prison by the Franco government. She was subsequently forbidden to give music lessons and made a living working in the silk industry. In later life, she dedicated himself to writing a memoir, which, together with other literary and journalistic columns, was published by the Reus City Council in 2009 under the title La Sala llarga i altres escrits (La Sala llarga and others writings); the work was in the form of a diary of her stay in prison and of her youth during the Second Republic.

== Death and legacy ==
She died in Barcelona in 1984 and was buried in the Reus cemetery. A street in the city of Reus bears her name. Since 2007, the Casal de les Dones de Reus, with the support of the city council, has been calling for the Antònia Abelló Filella Short Story Award, which is aimed solely at women to encourage and promote female writing.
