= Julia Iruretagoiena =

Spanish activist (1886–1954)

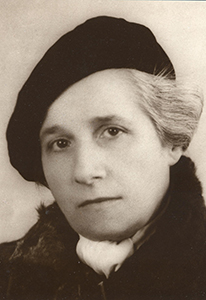
Iruretagoyena in the 1930s

Julia Iruretagoiena Selles (Irún, Spain, 1886 – Mexico City, Mexico, October 3, 1954) was a Spanish activist. She was the wife and widow of Tomás Meabe and became involved in his socialist activism, eventually experiencing exile.

== Biography ==
Born in Irún, Julia Iruretagoiena Selles was the daughter of the Republican mayor, León Iruretagoiena Camino. She married Tomás Meabe, a writer and founder of the Socialist Youth. After living in France and England and having a son, León Meabe, in 1912, they returned to Irún. They later moved to Madrid. On November 15, 1915, her husband died of tuberculosis. After becoming a widow (1915), Iruretagoiena began working at the Residencia de Señoritas (Senior Girls' Residence). There, among others, she met María de Maeztu, Elena Soriano, and Victoria Kent.

Iruretagoiena was a member of the Lyceum Club Femenino, where she regularly shared a table in the tea room with Victorina Durán, Matilde Calvo Rodero, Trudi Cra, wife of Luis Araquistáin, and Isabel Espada.

She worked for the International Labour Organization Delegation during the Civil War. On September 30, 1936, her son died in the explosion of the war materials laboratory where she worked.

In July 1939, Iruretagoiena arrived in Mexico on the SS Champlain. She collaborated in aiding exiles, working for the Women's Committee of the Junta de Auxilio a los Republicanos Españoles (JARE). She also dedicated herself to teaching languages and worked at the Espasa-Calpe publishing house. Iruretagoiena's concern focused on the children who had arrived in Morelia. On October 24, 1941, she was assigned to the private secretary of the president of the Mexican Delegation of the JARE. She never returned to Spain. Iruretagoiena died in Mexico City on October 3, 1954.
