= Matilde Huici =

Spanish educator and lawyer

- Born: Matilde Huici Navaz; 3 August 1890; Pamplona, Spain
- Died: 13 April 1965 (aged 74); Santiago, Chile
- Education: Complutense University of Madrid
- Political party: Spanish Socialist Workers' Party

Signature
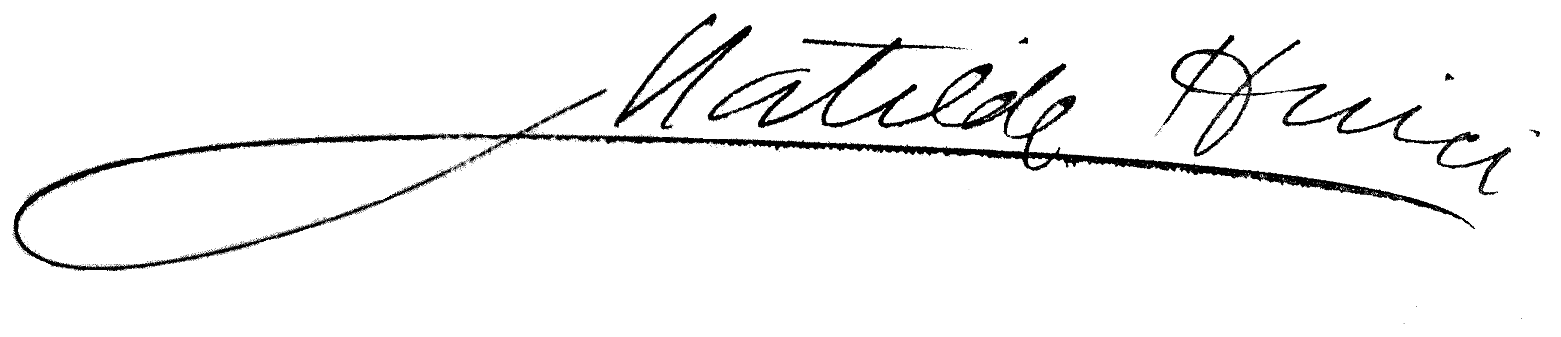

Matilde Huici Navaz (Pamplona, 3 August 1890 – Santiago, 13 April 1965) was a Spanish educator and lawyer. In addition to her collaboration with María de Maeztu in the Residencia de Señoritas, first official center in Spain established to promote university education for women, and the Lyceum Club Femenino, association of women, she was co-founder of the Association of Spanish University Women (with Victoria Kent and Clara Campoamor in 1928) and Spanish delegate of the Advisory Commission for Social and Humanitarian Issues of the League of Nations. Exiled in Chile since 1940, Huici founded in 1944 the School of Párvulos Educator of the University of Chile and developed an intense pedagogical activity.

== Early life ==
Matilde Huici Navaz was born on 3 August 1890 in the Spanish town of Pamplona as a third out four children in the family of Ascensión and Juan Huici. Her parents were rich liberal republicans. At the age of 17, she obtained master's degree in higher education in Bilbao.

== Early career and education ==
In 1909, she got employed as a teacher at the school in Ategorrieta neighborhood of San Sebastián. Two years later, she was appointed school principal. In 1916, she moved to Madrid in order to join the Residencia de Señoritas where she learned English and French, as well as the useful technique of shorthand. Three years later, Huici obtained a degree in the School of Higher Education and began to study law. In 1922, Huici become Inspector of Primary Education in Santa Cruz de Tenerife and in the following year entered the orbit of the pensioners by the Board for the Extension of Studies and Scientific Research (JAE) as a fellow at the Middlebury College where she taught Spanish from September 1923. Her leave of absence as inspector allowed her to finish studies and gain a law degree in 1926. While continuing to practice her profession and teaching at the Residencia de Señoritas, she participated in the work of the Juvenile Court of Madrid (1927) and in the public and political debate on the reform of the judicial system in relation towards women. (Note: In 1927, Huici joined Luis San Martin, who had been widowed and with an adopted son Luis San Martín (who would later provide Matilda's interesting biographical documentation).) In addition, she promoted the creation of the Association of the Spanish Female University Youth (JUF), later known as the Spanish Association of University Women. In 1928, she was among the promoters of the failed Socialist Liberal Group. In 1931, Huici and her husband become members of the Spanish Socialist Workers' Party (PSOE).

== During Second Spanish Republic ==
After the proclamation of the Second Spanish Republic in 1931, Huici joined the Subcommittee on Criminal Law of the Legal Advisory Commission of the Ministry of Justice. She was also entrusted, within the activities of the Child Protection Council, with the inspection of all juvenile courts in the country. (Note: In which her husband was judge and where she coincided with Victoria Kent and Clara Campoamor. She was also working as a member of the Auxiliary Children's Association, of which Ángel Ossorio y Gallardo was president.) She was also part of the Criminal Subcommittee of the Legal Advisory Commission and as such had participated in the drafting of the 1932 Spanish Criminal Code, and promoted the creation of the Center for Criminal Studies. In 1933, Huici visited the Soviet Union to study policies that applied to children. In 1935, she was appointed Spanish delegate to the Commission for the Protection of Children and Youth, based in Geneva. As a journalist, she was writing between 1935 and 1938 for publications such as Democracia weekly, directed by Andrés Saborit, El Socialista and in the Mujeres magazine published by the Women's Committee Against War and Fascism. With the triumph of the Popular Front, Huici proposed the replacement of priests who were teachers, through the creation of a Minor Psychological Research Institute for the training of specialized educators. One of her main objectives was to secularize education and protect children from the influence of religion. During the Spanish Civil War, she followed the republican government, first to Valencia (11 March 1937) and then to Barcelona. She went to France in the first months of 1939 and participated in the work of the Committee for Refugee Assistance from Paris and Geneva.

== Later life ==
Following republic's defeat she emigrated to Chile, where she arrived on 14 May 1940 on board of the SS Orduña. She was forced to work as a translator (Note: Mostly as a French translator for the Espasa-Calpe publishing house.) because her law degree wasn't recognized. She founded the School for the Education of Children of the University of Chile, which she managed between 1944 and 1962. In 1947, she was appointed a director of the Chilean-Spanish Cultural Directory. Matilde Huici died on 13 April 1965, aged 74.

== Literature ==
- García Sanz Marcotegui, Ángel (2010). Una “intelectual moderna” socialista. Pamplona: Universidad Pública de Navarra. Fundación Carlos Chívite. 9788497692618
- San Martín Montilla, María Nieves (2009). Matilde Huici Navaz: la tercera mujer. Narcea Ediciones. 9788427716353
- Vázquez Ramil, Raquel (2012). Mujeres y educación en la España contemporánea. La Institución Libre de Enseñanza y la Residencia de Señoritas de Madrid. Madrid: Akal. 978-84-460-2920-5
