= Matilde Muñoz Barberi =

Spanish writer

Matilde Muñoz Barberi (Madrid, April 11, 1895 – Havana, August 12, 1954) was a Spanish writer of various genres. She also used the pseudonym Selma Barberi.

== Biography ==
She was born on April 11, 1895, in Madrid, Spain. She was the daughter of journalist Eduardo Muñoz García (1863–1915), a native of Jaén, and Laura Barberi Archidona, a native of Ciudad Real.

She studied Philosophy and Literature. She worked at the newspaper El Imparcial, where she wrote reviews in the art section and published her first works. In addition to being a journalist, she was a novelist, essayist, playwright, poet, and radio scriptwriter. She was a member of the Lyceum Club Femenino, where she mingled with prominent intellectuals of the time.

After the Spanish Civil War, she was banned from working as a journalist and decided to go into exile, settling in Cuba in 1945, where her half-brother Eduardo Muñoz Nicart (1912–1963), her sister-in-law María Bachs Fornés (1911–1987), and her nephews Eduardo Muñoz Bachs (1937–2001) and Ana María Muñoz Bachs (1939–), all of whom were artists, lived. Matilde focused on theater.

She died at the age of 59, on August 12, 1954, in Havana.
