= Ricardo Gutiérrez Abascal =

Spanish art critic

Ricardo Gutiérrez Abascal (1883–1963), also known by his pseudonym Juan de la Encina, was a Spanish art critic.

== Life ==
He was born in Bilbao, and educated in Germany. In 1931 he was named director of the Madrid Museum of Modern Art but exiled to Mexico in 1939. He authored The Masters of Modern Art (Los Maestros del Arte Moderno), Julio Antonio (1920), Victorio Macho (1926), and Altarpiece of Modern Painting (Retablo de la Pintura Moderna) (1953). He was also known by the pseudonym Juan de la Encina. He died in Mexico.

== See also ==
- Victorio Macho
- Pilar de Zubiaurre
