= José Camprubí =

Spanish-language newspaper publisher

- Born: José Augusto Luis Raimundo Camprubí y Aymar; November 28, 1879; Ponce, Puerto Rico
- Died: March 11, 1942 (aged 62); New York, New York
- Occupation: Spanish language newspaper publisher
- Years active: 1918–42
- Organization: La Prensa
- Spouse: Agnes Ethel Leaycraft
- Relatives: Zenobia Camprubí (sister)

José Augusto Luis Raimundo Camprubí y Aymar (November 28, 1879 – March 11, 1942) was a pioneering Spanish-language newspaper publisher in the United States and an advocate of cooperation between North America, South America, and Spain.

== Early life ==
José Augusto Luis Raimundo Camprubí y Aymar was born in Ponce, Puerto Rico, which was then a Spanish colony, to Raimundo Camprubí y Escudero and Isabel Aymar y Lucca de Camprubí. His father, a Catalan civil engineer, was working in Puerto Rico for the Spanish colonial government, supervising the construction of the Ponce-Coamo road. When he was still an infant, Camprubí was taken by his parents to Spain, and he grew up in Barcelona.

== Education ==
Camprubí came to the United States in 1896 and studied at The Hotchkiss School in Lakeville, Connecticut. He went on to Harvard, where he received an A.B. degree in 1901 and a B.S. degree in civil engineering in 1902.

== Career ==
Camprubí's early career followed his training in civil engineering. He represented the firm of Stone & Webster in Boston, El Paso, Texas, and Terre Haute, Indiana before joining the Public Service Corporation in Newark, New Jersey. He was subsequently employed by the Hudson and Manhattan Railroad during the construction of the Hudson Tubes, the railway tunnels beneath the Hudson River linking Manhattan and northern New Jersey. In 1912 to 1914, he represented General Electric in Buenos Aires.

At the end of World War I, he approached a friend from both Hotchkiss and Harvard, Ernest Gruening, who had been a journalist prior to his brief service in the United States Army. Camprubí explained that he "was in the market for a Spanish-language newspaper, which he hoped would promote better relations between the United States and Latin America while also improving the cultural image of New York City's Hispanics." In light of Gruening's background in journalism, Camprubí asked whether he thought that the plan was feasible. Gruening suggested purchasing La Prensa, a struggling Spanish-language weekly that was based in New York City. Camprubí pursued the idea of buying the newspaper and converting it into a daily, and he asked Gruening to serve as editor. Despite the fact that he spoke no Spanish, Gruening had no other attractive offers and agreed. Gruening remained with the newspaper for over a year, dealing primarily with the business aspects of running a newspaper. (Gruening entered politics shortly thereafter and later became one of the first two U.S. Senators for Alaska.)

Camprubí ran La Prensa for the remainder of his life and became a prominent spokesman both for the improvement of relations between the United States and for the welfare of Spanish-speaking Americans. He set La Prensa's policy as one of stressing "democracy and cooperation between the nations of North and South America." By the time Cambrubí greeted Federico García Lorca, the Spanish playwright, at the docks of New York in 1929, La Prensa was "New York's most important Spanish-language daily" and "the newspaper of record of the city's burgeoning Spanish-speaking community."

Following Cambrubí's death from a heart ailment in 1942, his wife and daughters took control of the company and turned it into the first US daily newspaper run by women. The family sold the newspaper in 1957, and it merged with El Diario de Nueva York in 1963 to become El Diario La Prensa.

== Personal life ==
On February 18, 1909, Camprubí married Agnes Ethel Leaycraft (daughter of Charles Russell Leaycraft and Mary Leontine Roosevelt); she was a third cousin of President Theodore Roosevelt. The couple had two daughters: Inés (born in 1911) and Leontine (born in 1915). Caprubí's sister, Zenobia Camprubí, was a writer and poet as well as the wife of Spanish poet and Nobel Prize laureate Juan Ramón Jiménez.
