= Eli Bartra =

Mexican philosopher

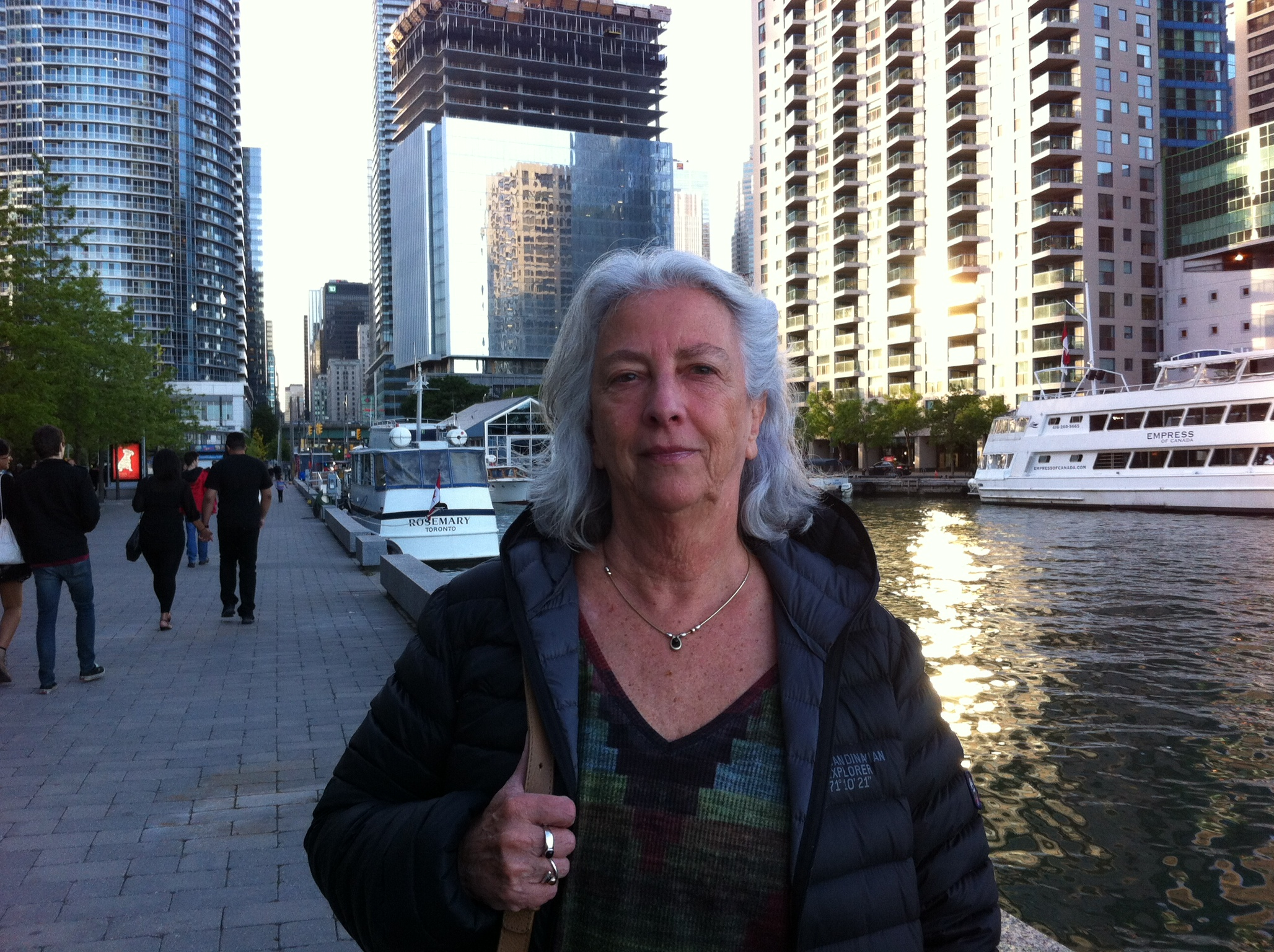
- Born: 6 September 1947 (age 79); Mexico City
- Education: Doctor of Philosophy (UNAM); Maîtrise Specialisée en Esthétique (Paris 1)
- Alma mater: National Autonomous University of Mexico; Paris 1 Panthéon-Sorbonne University
- Occupations: Philosopher, researcher, and university professor
- Employer: Universidad Autónoma Metropolitana
- Spouse: John Mraz
- Children: Maiala Meza Bartra; Anna Lee Mraz Bartra
- Parent(s): Anna Murià; Agustí Bartra

Eli Bartra (born 6 September 1947, in Mexico City) is a feminist philosopher and a pioneer in researching women and folk art in different places of the world, but particularly, in Mexico. She is the daughter of the writers Anna Murià and Agustí Bartra, two Catalan refugees in Mexico.

== Education ==
She has a PhD in philosophy from the National Autonomous University of Mexico (UNAM), 1990. Between 1973 and 1974, she studied in the PHD program of Sociology of Literature at the School for Advanced Studies in the Social Sciences in Paris. In 1973, she obtained her degree of Maîtrise Specialisée in Esthétique from Panthéon-Sorbonne University. She studied the BA in philosophy at National Autonomous University of Mexico.

== Career ==
In 1968, she coordinated the exhibitions in the Olympic Organizing Committee in Mexico; she also coordinated the art expositions in the University Museum of Sciences and Art (UNAM) between 1967 and 1969. She worked at the magazine Artes Visuales, belonging to the Museum of Modern Art, from 1977 to 1980. She has been a researcher and professor since 1976.

Bartra has been a professor at the Universidad Autónoma Metropolitana-Campus Xochimilco (UAM-X) since 1977, where she was named Distinguished Professor in 2017. She is a member of the Sistema Nacional de Investigadores (SNI), at the highest level (Level III). In 1982, she was the cofounder of the research area “Women, Identity and Power,” within the Department of Politics and Culture. She has been coordinator of the Masters in Women's Studies, 1994–1996; 1998-2000 and the coordinator of the Feminist Studies PHD Program from 2017 to 2019.

Bartra has brought to bear a feminist gaze on visual arts and women in Mexico. She has written many books, chapters and articles. Also, she has been a visiting professor in different countries, including Spain, Brazil, New Zealand, Argentina, Japan, United Kingdom and the USA.

== Feminist methodology ==
Bartra has insisted on the necessity of developing “feminist methodologies” applicable to the case of Mexico. These are largely absent or underdeveloped, due to what Bartra defines as “intellectual neocolonization”. With this situation, she denounces that in the underdeveloped countries, and in Mexico in particular, feminist theory has used tools and methodologies alien to their specific contexts and subjectivities. Dissatisfied, then, with the dominant trend of multicultural and political correctness in research, Bartra proposes a feminist methodology that recognizes its anti-sexist perspective and deconstructs it. What she states, in this sense, is not a methodology with a different procedure or object of study, but rather, a methodology that considers the “feminist point of view” as a way of deconstructing sexism in research, and the purpose, above all, is the liberation of woman. The sexist bias dominates in almost all intellectual production in our patriarchal societies.

== Publications ==
=== Books ===
- Visual Culture and Gender in Mexico, New York, Bloomsbury, 2026.
- Francesca Gargallo: remembranzas sentires y su propia voz, Mexico, Desde Abajo/UAM, 2024 (coordinator). Francesca Gargallo Celetani: soffiare sul fuocco affinche s'accenda l'alba, Roma: Futura, 2025 (italian version)
- Francesca Gargallo: remembranzas sentires y su propia voz, Mexico, UAM, 2023 (coordinator)
- Desnudo y arte, Mexico, UAM-X, 2da ed, 2021, ISBN 978-607-28-2367-9
- Feminismo en acción, México, UAM-X, 2021., México, UAM-X, 2021. (Coordinadora con Ana Lau Jaiven y Merarit Viera Alcazar) ISBN 978-607-28-2295-5 (impreso). ISBN 978-607-28-2296-2 (epub)
- Estrategias creativas de sobrevivencia. Feminismo y arte popular, México, UAM-X, 2021. (Coordinadora con Liliana Elvira Moctezuma). Pdf y papel ISBN 978-607-28-2247-4
- Interculturalidad estética y prácticas artesanales. Mujeres, feminismo y arte popular, México, UAM, 2019. (Coordinadora con Liliana Elvira Moctezuma y Marisol Cárdenas. Introducción y capítulo)
- Feminism and Folk Art: Case Studies in Mexico, Japan, New Zealand, and Brazil, Lanham, MD., Lexington Books/ Rowman & Littlefield, 2019.
- Desnudo y arte, Bogotá, ediciones Desde Abajo, Colección Feminismo Nuestroamericanos, 2018.
- Mosaico de creatividades. Experiencias de arte popular, Mexico: UAM, Collection Abate Faria 12, 2013.
- Women in Mexican Folk Art. Of Promises, Betrayals, Monsters and Celebrities, Cardiff, University of Wales Press, Iberian and Latin American Studies, 2011.
- Mujeres en el arte popular. De promesas, traiciones, monstruos y celebridades, Mexico UAM/Conaculta-FONCA, 2005.
- Frida Kahlo. Mujer, ideología y arte, Barcelona: Icaria, 1994. (4th. ed, 2005). (1st ed. Barcelona: La Sal, edicions de les dones, 1987).
- Interculturalidad estética y prácticas artesanales. Mujeres, feminismo y arte popular, Mexico: UAM-X, 2019. (Co-editor).
- Mujeres, feminismo y arte popular, UAM-X/Unisinos/Obra abierta, 2015 (Co-editor with María Guadalupe Huacuz Elías).
- Creatividad invisible. Mujeres y arte popular en América Latina y el Caribe, México, UNAM-PUEG, 2004. (Editor).
- Crafting Gender. Women and Folk Art in Latin America and the Caribbean, London/Durham: Duke University Press, 2003. (Editor).
- Feminismo en México, ayer y hoy, Mexico: UAM, Colección Molinos de Viento, No. 130, 2000. (2nd ed., 2002). (Co-author).
- Debates en torno a una metodología feminista, Mexico: UAM-X, 1998. (2nd edition, UNAM-PUEG/UAM, 2002). ( Editor).

=== Selected articles ===
- “El feminismo y sus olas”, Revista Zona Franca, Nº 28, Rosario, Argentina, Centro de Estudios Interdisciplinarios sobre las Mujeres (CEIM)-Maestría Poder y Sociedad desde la Problemática de Género (MG), diciembre 2020, pp. 516–549. ISSN, 2545-6504 DOI https://doi.org/10.35305/zf.vi28.179
- “Estética feminista y artes visuales”, Fernando Huerta Rojas y Mercedes Castro Espinosa (eds.) Imaginarios y representaciones estéticas en las artes, México: UACM, 2019, pp. 23–35.
- “El feminismo en las universidades”, Momento: diálogos em educação, v. 28, n. 3, sep-dic., 2018, pp. 337–349. E-ISSN 2316-3100. https://periodicos.furg.br/momento/issue/view/637/showToc
- “Estudios feministas, arte popular y educación popular”, Rita de Cassia Fraga Machado y Amanda Motta Castro (orgs.) Educação popular em debate, Anhangabaú, Brasil, Editorial Paco, 2017.
- “Trasterradas y nómades. Notas autorreferenciales”, La palabra y el hombre, Nº 40, Xalapa, Universidad Veracruzana, April–June 2017.
- "Maricarmen de Lara, una infatigable cineasta”, Joel Estudillo García y José Edgar Nieto Arizmendi (eds.) Feministas mexicanas del siglo XX: espacios y ámbitos de incidencia, Mexico: Pueg-UNAM, 2016, pp. 258–280.
- “O nu na arte popular mexicana”, Revista Trama Interdisciplinar, Dossiê: Mulheres, feminismo, artesanato e arte popular: saberes de ofícios, V.7, Nº1, (São Paulo, Universidade Presbiteriana Mackenzie, Jan.-Apr. 2016) pp. 16–30.
- “Alebrijes”, Eric Zolov (ed.) Iconic Mexico: An Encyclopedia from Acapulco to Zócalo, Santa Barbara, Ca. ABC-Clio, Vol. I, 2015.
- “Autodesnudas” and Curator of the exhibition “Autodesnudas”, Museo de Mujeres Artistas Mexicanas (MUMA), July 2014. http://www.museodemujeres.com/exposiciones/213-autodesnudas
- “La frónesis y la hibris de los estudios sobre mujeres”, Frónesis, Revista de Filosofía Jurídica, Social y Política, Instituto de Filosofía del Derecho Dr. J.M. Delgado Ocando, Universidad del Zulia, (Venezuela, Vol. 21, No. 1, 2014), pp. 85 – 96.
- “Un siglo… las mujeres. Retazos de historia”, Emma Cecilia García Krinsky , Mujeres detrás de la lente. 100 años de fotografía en México 1910-2010, Mexico, Conaculta, 2012, pp. 55–66.
- “How black is La negra Angustias?” Third Text, 116, (London: May 2012).
- “Puentes diversos entre feminismo y artes visuales”, Xabier Arakistain and Lourdes méndes (eds.) Producción artística y teoría feminista del arte: nuevos debates III, Vitoria, Spain, Ayuntamiento de Vitoria/Montehermoso, 2012, (Basque, Spanish, English), pp. 6–13; 124–131; 246–253. ISBN 928-849684543-5
