= Juan José Domenchina =

Spanish poet and literary critic

Juan José Domenchina Moreu
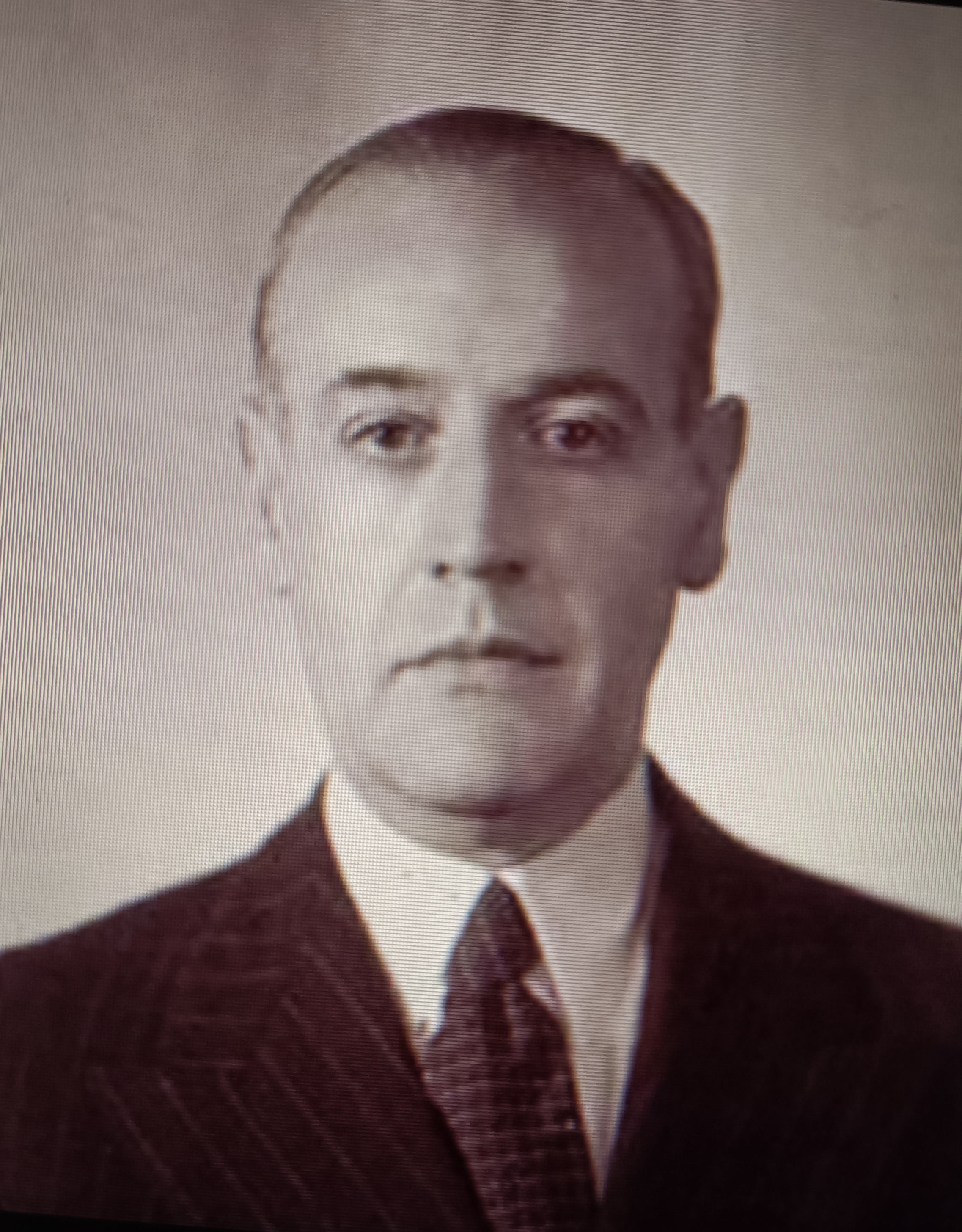
- Born: 18 May 1898; Madrid, Spain
- Died: 27 October 1959 (aged 61); Mexico City, Mexico
- Occupation: Writer
- Known for: Poems of exile

Juan José Domenchina Moreu (18 May 1898 – 27 October 1959) was a Spanish poet and literary critic from the "Generation of '27".

== Life ==
Juan José Domenchina was born in Madrid in 1898. He trained as a teacher but never taught. His early poetry shows the influence of Juan Ramón Jiménez, although it has a more Baroque quality. Apart from poetry he wrote at least two novels, La túnica de Neso (1919) and Dédalo (1932). His wife was Ernestina de Champourcín (born 1905), also a poet and novelist. By 1936 Domenchina had published eight books of poetry. Domenchina also contributed literary criticism to the Madrid newspapers El Sol and La Voz, and was involved in politics. During the Spanish Civil War (1936–39) under the government of Juan Negrín the sub-secretariat of Propaganda was headed by Leonard Martín Echevarría of the Republican Left. Domenchina, also of the Republican Left, headed the Spanish Information Service.

Due to his Republican ideals Domenchina was forced into exile in Mexico after the civil war. His wife accompanied him to Mexico and found work as an interpreter and translator. Domenchina's poetry changed in nature, reflecting the profound emotional impact of the defeat of the Republic. His later poetry was elegant and precise but his youthful vigor was replaced by passive stoicism, erotic themes mostly disappeared, and his lively interest in the nature of life and man were replaced by melancholy introspection. His last book of poetry was Exul Umbra (Mexico, 1948). He died in Mexico in 1959.

== Publications ==
Publications include:

- Del poema eterno, Madrid, Ediciones Mateu, 1917. Prólogo de Ramón Pérez de Ayala.
- Las interrogaciones del silencio, Madrid, Ediciones Mateu, 1918.
- Poesías escogidas. Ciclo de mocedad, 1916–1921, Madrid, Ediciones Mateu, 1922.
- La corporeidad de lo abstracto, Madrid, Renacimiento, 1929. Prólogo de Enrique Díez-Canedo.
- El tacto fervoroso, 1929–1930, Madrid, C.I.A.P., 1930.
- Dédalo, Madrid, Biblioteca Nueva, 1932. Con una caricatura lírica de Juan Ramón Jiménez.
- Margen, Madrid, Biblioteca Nueva, 1933.
- Poesías completas (1915–1934), Madrid, Signo, 1936.
- Poesías escogidas (1915–1939), México, La Casa de España en México, 1940.
- Destierro. Sonetos. Décimas concéntricas y excéntricas. Burlas y veras castellanas, México, Editorial Atlante, 1942. Prólogo de Azorín.
- Tercera elegía jubilar, México, Editorial Atlante, 1944.
- Pasión de sombra (Itinerario), México, Editorial Atlante, 1944.
- Tres elegías jubilares, México, Editorial Centauro, 1946.
- Exul umbra, México, Stylo, 1948.
- Perpetuo arraigo, México, Signo, 1949.
- La sombra desterrada, México, Almendros y Cía., 1950.
- Nueve sonetos y tres romances con una carta rota, incoherente e impertinente a Alfonso Reyes, México, Editorial Atlante, 1952.
- El extrañado, 1948–1957, México, Tezontle, 1958.
- Poemas y fragmentos inéditos, 1944–1959, México, Ecuador 0º, 0′, 0″, 1964. Transcripción de Ernestina de Champourcín.
- La sombra desterrada (1948–1950), Málaga, El Guadalhorce, 1969.
- El extrañado y otros poemas, Madrid, Rialp (col. Adonais), 1969. Prólogo de Gerardo Diego.
- Poesía (1942–1958) (ed. Ernestina de Champourcín), Madrid, Editora Nacional, 1975.
- La sombra desterrada y otros poemas, Madrid, Torremozas, 1994. Introducción de Ernestina de Champourcín.
- Obra poética (ed. e intr. Amelia de Paz), 2 tomos, Madrid, Castalia/Comunidad de Madrid, 1995. Prólogo de Emilio Miró.
- Jeanne Marie, Los caminos del alma / Les Chemins de l'âme - memoria viva de los poetas del 27' mémoire vive des poètes de la Génération de 1927, éditions Paradigme Orléans

== Sources ==
- Bellver, C. G. (March 1975). "Juan Jose Domenchina, Poet of Exile". MLN. 90 (2, Hispanic Issue). The Johns Hopkins University Press: 252–264. doi:10.2307/2906861. JSTOR 2906861.
- Bleiberg, Germán (1993-01-01). Dictionary of the Literature of the Iberian Peninsula. Greenwood Publishing Group. ISBN 978-0-313-28731-2.
- García, Hugo (2010). The Truth about Spain!: Mobilizing British Public Opinion, 1936–1939. Sussex Academic Press. ISBN 978-1-84519-332-4.
- "Juan José Domenchina". Biografías y Vidas (in Spanish).
