= Zenobia Camprubí =

Spanish writer of Catalan and Puerto Rican descent (1887–1956)

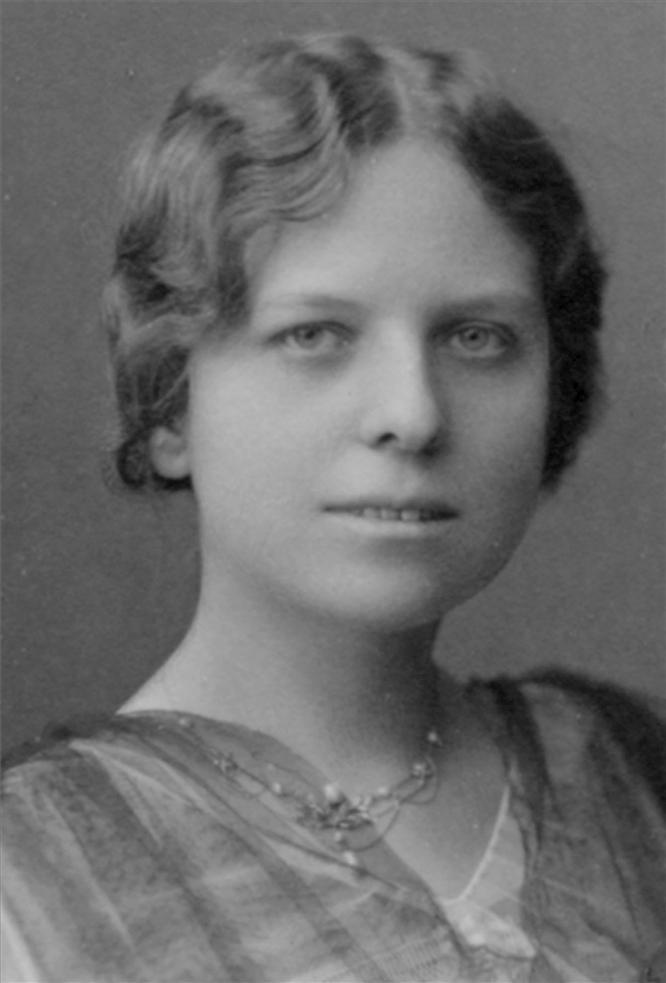
- Zenobia Camprubí, c.1905
- Born: Zenobia Salustiana Edith Camprubí y Aymar; 31 August 1887; Malgrat de Mar (Barcelona), Spain
- Died: 28 October 1956 (aged 69); San Juan, Puerto Rico
- Occupations: Writer, poet, translator
- Spouse: Juan Ramón Jiménez
- Relatives: Raimundo Camprubí Escudero and Isabel Aymar Lucca (parents)

Zenobia Camprubí Aymar (31 August 1887 – 25 October 1956) was a Spanish-born writer and poet; she was also a noted translator of the works of Rabindranath Tagore.

She was born in Malgrat de Mar (province of Barcelona, Catalonia) to a Puerto Rican mother and a Spanish father.

She later lived in the United States, studied at Columbia University, and spent the duration of the Spanish Civil War (18 July 1936 – 1 April 1939) writing her Diario ("Diary") in Cuba. Her brother, José Camprubí, was owner and publisher of La Prensa, New York's most important Spanish-language daily newspaper, from 1918 to 1942.

She eventually became a professor at the University of Maryland before her death from ovarian cancer, aged 69, in San Juan, Puerto Rico, two days after her husband Juan Ramón Jiménez received the Nobel Prize in Literature.

== Early life ==
On August 31, 1887, Zenobia Salustiana Edith Camprubí y Aymar was born in Carrer del Mar 87, in Malgrat de Mar (Barcelona) in a wealthy Spanish-Puerto Rican family. She was registered with the names of Zenobia, Salustiana, and Edith. Zenobia Camprubí Aymar was the daughter of Isabel Aymar Lucca and Raimundo Camprubí Escudero. Her maternal grandfather, Augusto Aymar, was a well-off American merchant and her grandmother was a member of a family of Corsicans, settled in Puerto Rico.

Both her mother and grandmother had studied in the best schools in the United States and had many family ties in the United States. Her father, Raimundo Camprubí, was an engineer of roads, canals and ports, and belonged to a Catalan military family. Zenobia's parents married in Puerto Rico in 1879, where he had traveled to work for the construction of a highway between Ponce and Coamo. The couple had four children José (1879), Raimundo, Zenobia (1887) and Augusto (1890).

During the first two years of her life, when summer time arrived, the Camprubí family moved to ‘La Quinta’ in Malgrat to enjoy the pleasant Mediterranean climate in the summer season.

In the winter of 1890, her brother Augusto Camprubí Aymar was born in Barcelona. This would be the last year that Zenobia and her family enjoy the holidays in Malgrat, perhaps because of changes of post that her father had.

At the age of nine she traveled to the United States for the first time with her brother José and her mother. The reason was to enter his older brother in a high school in preparation for his subsequent entry into Harvard (Cambridge) and settle a matter of inheritance, due to the fact that her grandmother had died in 1895. After the appearance of Zenobia's health problems, the family was forced to move their residence to the municipality of Sarriá, Spain a year later. In this place, Zenobia met Maria Muntadas de Caparà, with whom she eventually established a great friendship.

Zenobia Camprubí with her husband Juan Ramón Jiménez

In 1900, Zenobia founded a partnership, together with her friend Maria Muntadas, that was called "Las Abejas Industriosas" ("The working bees"). By that time she had not yet reached thirteen years of age, but she was already showing a spirit of restlessness and organization.

In 1901, her father, Raimundo Camprubí, was assigned to Tarragona as Head of Public Works. Zenobia travelled with her mother and younger brother Augusto to Switzerland in search of a remedy for a rare ear and eye disease that her brother had suffered after diphtheria.

In March of the same year, the New York youth magazine St. Nicholas published a short story of Zenobia called A Narrow Escape. Also published was her autobiographical work Malgrat, inspired by her stay in the coastal town. Zenobia's father was then transferred to Valencia. During their stay in this city, the family lived on Calle Navelos 14. Zenobia wrote and published several literary works, among them, "The Garret I have known". Zenobia took care of the operation of the family house in Valencia because her mother left for a season with her family in Barcelona. She received a literary award consisting of a Gold Badge from St. Nicholas Illustrated Magazine for Boys and Girls for her work "When Grandmother went to school".

As a result of a marriage separation, Isabel Aymar (mother of Zenobia) and Zenobia, her daughter, moved to live in the United States in 1905. They settled in Newburgh, New York, where many family members and family friends lived. The trip began with a visit to Canada in September, accompanied by her maternal uncle José, and her brother Raimundo. They went to Québec, where her aunt Lillian was awaiting them.

During these years, her life in the United States was totally different from the Spanish one. She travelled through Washington, Boston and New York. She attended dances, meetings, lunches, teas and all kinds of social events. Meanwhile, she continued reading and studying – Latin, literature, music, European and American history – writing, attending cultural events, preparing for the future, taking care of her education. She began to be courted by a lawyer, friend of the family, Henry Shattuck.

In 1908, Zenobia enrolled in the Teacher's College of the Columbia University (New York) to study English literature and composition.

After the marriage's reconciliation, Mrs. Isabel Aymar returned to Spain in 1909 in the company of Zenobia and her cousin Hannah. They called her "the Little American", since she began her university studies in Columbia; she attended cultural activities and women's clubs. She came into contact with American feminism, traveled alone, read the Spanish and English classics and followed a course on literature.

They settled in La Rábida (Huelva) where Mr. Raimundo Camprubí was the chief engineer of the port of Huelva. In a room of the house where they settled, Zenobia improvised a school to teach a group of nineteen children of the surroundings. In 1910, Zenobia's father was transferred to Madrid. The family residence was set in Paseo de la Castellana.

On the return from a short trip to Switzerland in March 1911, Zenobia and her mother went through Barcelona and visited Malgrat. This was the first time that Zenobia returned to her native house, which she found "sad and dark". In October, the third trip of Zenobia to the United States took place on the occasion of the birth of the first daughter of her brother José, Inés. The idea of exporting crafts, embroidery and books to North America arose.

In the first months of the year 1912, Zenobia returned to Madrid, she continued to publish articles in American magazines. She took advantage of all that Madrid offered and got involved in cultural and intellectual projects. There, she was related primarily concerned with Americans, she was distressed because she could not move freely alone until she met Susan Huntington, who ran the Instituto Internacional de Señoritas, where foreigners were staying, attending the summer courses they organized.

== Juan Ramón Jiménez ==
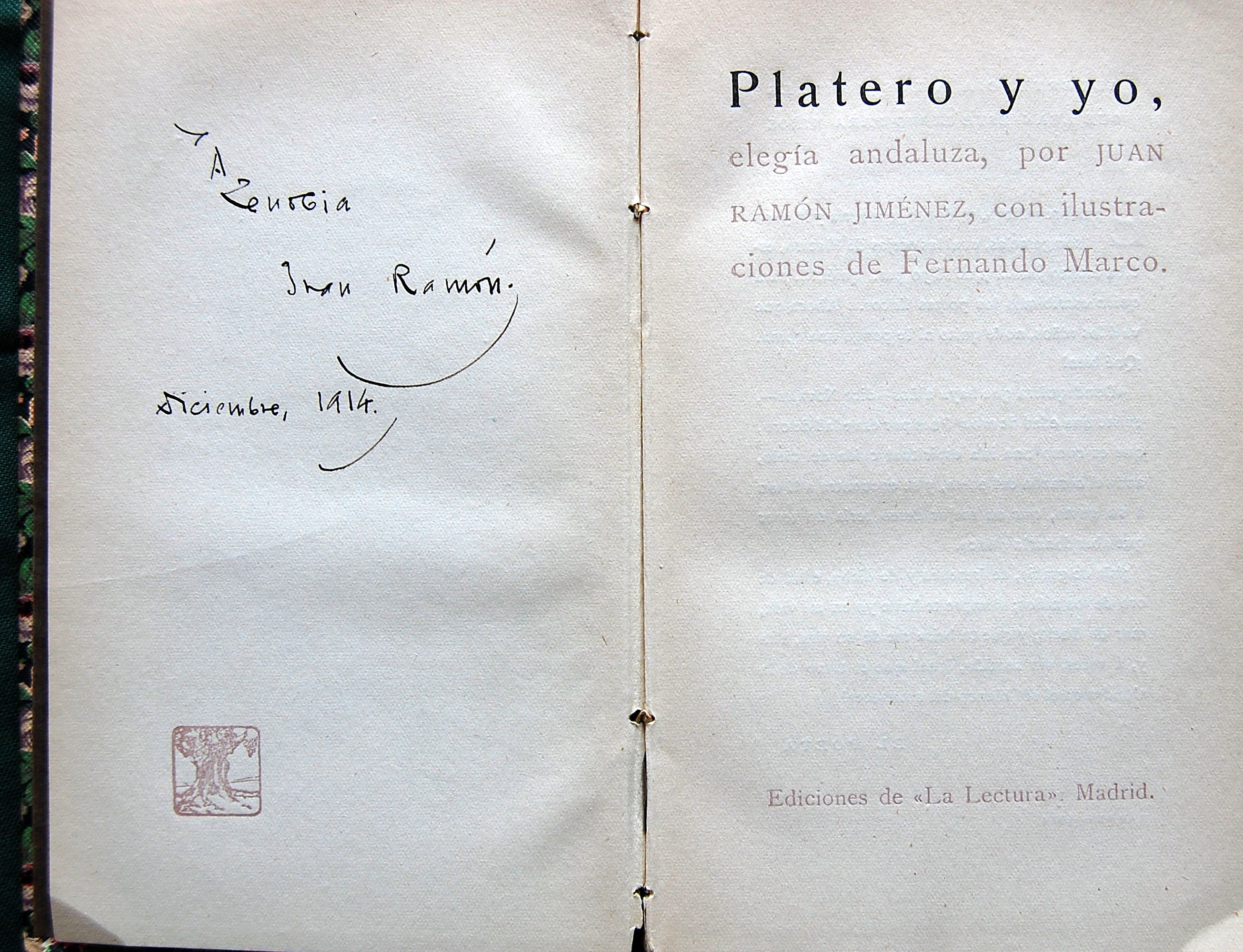
Dedication of Juan Ramón Jiménez to Zenobia

In 1913, Zenobia kept an epistolary relationship with her North American suitor Henry Shattuck, who came to Spain in May to discuss details about a possible marriage. Through a letter, the relation split up, though they remained friends.

She attended many conferences, but she could only do so if she was accompanied by an American couple, the Bynes. This couple organized parties and in them, she heard about a fierce and strange poet hosted in the Residencia de Estudiantes, who complained about the noise but stuck his ear to the wall when he heard Zenobia's laugh, whom he didn't know yet. Zenobia met Juan Ramón Jiménez in 1913, in a conference imparted by Bartolomé Cossío, celebrated in the Residence where he worked.

In 1914, Zenobia translated some verses from The Crescent Moon by Tagore, including a prologue-poem by Juan Ramón. In June she visited Ávila and Segovia. By the end of the year, there were some disagreements between Juan Ramón and Zenobia. They couldn't deliver the translated La Luna Nueva by Tagore on time for its publication, and to compensate this problem they published the children edition of Platero y yo.

In December, Zenobia and her mother boarded in Cádiz on their way to New York, to avoid the relationship of her daughter with the poet. But, on 12 February 1916, the Jiménezes arrived in New York and on 2 March Zenobia and he married in the Catholic Church St. Stephen of New York. They traveled around the United States: Boston, Philadelphia, Baltimore, Washington... On June 7 they boarded the ship "Montevideo", accompanied by Mrs. Isabel Aymar, destination Spain. After landing in Cádiz they arrived in Sevilla, where they spent a couple of days, on their way to La Palma del Condado, where they were expected by Juan Ramón's relatives, who wanted to meet his wife at last. On 1 July they arrived in Madrid. In 1917, Zenobia translated and published El Jardinero ("The Gardener"), El Cartero del Rey ("The Post Office"), Pájaros perdidos ("Stray Birds") and La Cosecha ("The Harvest") by Tagore. Jiménez added a prologue-poem to them. Also in collaboration with Juan Ramón, she translated El Asceta ("The Ascetic"), El rey y la reina ("King and Queen"), Malini, Ofrenda Lírica ("Gitanjali"), Las Piedras Hambrientas ("The Hungry Stones") and Ciclo de Primavera ("Cycle of Spring"), all of them by Tagore. Both Camprubí and Jiménez used a simplified Spanish orthography different from the RAE standard.

Like Katherine Bourland, María de Maeztu and Rafaela Ortega y Gasset, Zenobia founded in Madrid La Enfermera a Domicilio ("The Home Nurse") in 1918, an association whose purpose was taking care of ill children and adults from working families, providing them with food and medication and taking them to dispensaries and to prestigious doctors who attended them for free. In addition, she took control of a small business that compensated for the economical problems of the couple. She calmed her husband's mood, encouraging his quill and sorting out problems as important as abandoning Spain with dignity after the outbreak of the Civil War in Spain.

On 6 April 1920, the play El Cartero del Rey by Tagore was premiered, translated and adapted to theatres by Zenobia. There were three functions in several days. She made a partnership with her friend Inés Muñoz to continue with the labor of exportation of handicraft, embroidery, ceramic and books to America. They had already received and managed her brother José's products. In October, beside María Goyri de Menéndez Pidal and María de Maeztu, she founded the Comité para la Concesión de Becas a Mujeres Españolas en el Extranjero ("Committee for the Granting of Scholarships to Spanish Women Abroad"). She was its secretary since its foundation until 1936. Then, the idea of another business came up: sublet apartments that she would furnish. Her relatives and North American friends used to ask her to look for an apartment with certain characteristics to stay in Madrid, something that wasn't easy, so she decided to do it herself. Juan Ramón and Zenobia moved to 8, Lista St. in 1921. The representation of John M. Synge's play, Jinetes hacia el mar ("Riders to the Sea") and Zenobia's version and translation of La hermana mayor ("Elder Sister"), by Tagore was made in the Athenaeum of Madrid. In 1922, she did a short trip to Catalonia and Baleares with her friend Inés Muñoz. In Barcelona she would visit her paternal uncle José Camprubí and her childhood friends.

On 15 March 1924, her father died in Madrid, at the age of 78. By the end of June and starting of July, Zenobia and Juan Ramón, invited by Federico García Lorca and his family, enjoyed their holidays in Granada; this was not the first time she traveled to this city. In August they spent some days in Moguer and in October they traveled again to around Andalucía, across Málaga, Córdoba, Sevilla and Moguer. In 1926, the Lyceum Club Femenino was founded in Madrid, one of the first women associations created in Spain. Zenobia would be the secretary while María de Maeztu was the president. She developed an important labour impacting noticeably in the cultural scene in those times. In summer, the couple travelled through Spain, they went all over the North West area of the peninsula: Soria, Logroño, Pamplona, San Sebastián, Bilbao, Santander, Asturias, Santiago de Compostela, Vigo and León. In 1928, the "Arte Popular Español" was inaugurated in Madrid, dedicated to the selling of Spanish handicraft. She decorated the Parador Nacional Sierra de Gredos. On 18 August Mrs. Isabel Aymar died.

In July 1929, the couple traveled to Salamanca where they met Miguel de Unamuno and Zenobia's older brother, José. Her family came to Spain to visit the expositions of Barcelona and Seville and they would also visit Moguer. In August, they travelled to Southern France and visited Fuenterrabía, Irún, Hendaye, Biarritz, Bayonne, Pau and Tarbes, and settled in Lourdes. In mid-August 1930, her sister-in-law Ethel and her niece Leontine accompanied Zenobia and Juan Ramón to Vigo to board towards New York. From Vigo, the couple went to Barcelona to visit Zenobia's friends.

In 1931, Zenobia detected a tumour and she decided not to submit herself to a surgery. She received the X-ray treatment to avoid the growth. The sculptor Marga Gil Roësset sculpted a Zenobia bust.

Zenobia worked in 1935 as decorator of the hotel Paradero de Ifach, in Calpe (Alicante) and progressively stopped subletting apartments, since it was not profitable anymore.

== Exile ==
In the early days of the civil war, Juan Ramón and Zenobia collaborated with the protection of minors in the care and accommodation of children orphaned by the war: they welcomed twelve children from 4 to 8 years of age, in a flat at Velazquez Street.

On 22 August 1936, they left Spain. Four days later they boarded in Cherbourg in the 'Aquitaine' liner bound for New York and the couple began a journey in which they visited Cuba, United States, Buenos Aires and Puerto Rico, where Zenobia worked as a teacher at the University of Puerto Rico.

In 1937 and 1938 the Jiménez-Camprubí couple was located in Cuba and lived in the Hotel Vedado in Havana. They developed a series of social and cultural activities, as well as taking part in a political act of support on the Spanish Republican faction. They continued taking care of Spanish orphan children and fundraising through subscriptions in the press of New York newspapers and other publication. Zenobia also worked as a volunteer in women's prisons and donated her clothes.

In January 1939, they moved to Coral Gables, Florida. At the end of the Civil War, the flat that Zenobia and Juan Ramón had in Madrid that survived during all the conflict had been robbed: books, documents and other personal items were taken.

In January of the following year, when Juan Ramón taught his first formal lecture at the University of Miami, Zenobia simultaneously read an English version translated by her. In 1942 her older brother, José Camprubí, died of a heart attack.

In 1943 Zenobia and Juan Ramón moved to Washington and, in January of the next year, the University of Maryland wanted Zenobia to teach Spanish to a group of soldiers. After that, they decided to hire her as a teacher in the Department of history and European culture too.

In 1945 they moved to live in Riverdale, because she was given a permanent job. Two years later, they bought a house where she and Juan Ramón Jiménez taught classes. In 1948 the couple travelled around Argentina and Uruguay. The trip was extended more than three months so the poet could give 12 more lectures. Neither Juan Ramón nor Zenobia imagined the massive and warm reception they would receive there.

In 1950, they traveled during November and December to Puerto Rico due to the nervous breakdowns of Juan Ramón.

In 1951, he had to get a cancer operation in Boston. In 1954, he had to have another operation in Puerto Rico, because he didn't want to go to the United States. Zenobia not only left behind an interesting life, but also the possibility of receiving a good treatment for her own health problem. Zenobia signed a contract with the University of Puerto Rico to translate scientific brochures for a year. She started her classes at the University of Río Piedras. At the end of the year, she was operated on for cervical cancer in the Massachusetts General Hospital in Boston.

In February 1952 she recovered and returned to Puerto Rico. She continued her work at the university. On 18 August, Zenobia completed the Puerto Rico oath as an American citizen, thus she got dual citizenship.

At the beginning of 1953, her brother Augusto suffered cancer and spent a season with her and Juan Ramón in Puerto Rico before returning to the United States where he would die at the end of March. Zenobia completed her cancer treatment.

== Later life ==
In 1954, Zenobia stopped working at the university because of medical advice. The American magazine published an autobiographical entitled Juan Ramón and I.

In 1956, the cancer reappeared and in April Zenobia started a treatment that gave her serious burns. In the month of June, she flew to Boston for another operation, but the doctors told her not to have the operation and gave her only a few months to live.

Zenobia died on 28 October 1956, in Puerto Rico, three days after her spouse received the Nobel Prize for literature.

Juan Ramón Jiménez survived two more years, and today, their remains are buried in Moguer.

== Legacy ==
In 1955, and at their behest, the University of Puerto Rico established a research room for the couple which would concentrate on their personal library and on modern Hispanic literature. The research room now also covers publications about the couple and contains an approximate total of 105,699 volumes and documents. It bears the name of Zenobia and Juan Ramón Jiménez to this day.

The House of Culture Zenobia and Juan Ramón was created in Moguer.

== See also ==
- List of Latin American writers
- List of Puerto Rican writers
- List of Puerto Ricans
- Puerto Rican literature
- Multi-Ethnic Literature of the United States
- Puerto Rican poetry
