= Carlos D. Ramirez =

Puerto Rican publisher

Carlos D. Ramirez (August 19, 1946 – July 11, 1999) was an American publisher who purchased El Diario La Prensa — the oldest Spanish-language newspaper in the United States — from the Gannett Company in 1989, and succeeded in turning around the paper's longstanding decline in readership and returned it to profitability.

Ramirez was born on August 19, 1946, in San Juan, Puerto Rico, and grew up in Corona, Queens. He attended Baruch College, where he graduated with a degree in accounting and finance, and was hired by El Diario La Prensa in 1981 as its comptroller. The Gannett Company had just bought the paper in a deal valued at $10 million. Ramirez worked his way up to serve as the paper's publisher and president.

== El Diario La Prensa ==
El Diario La Prensa, the oldest Spanish-language newspaper in the country, was formed in 1968, the result of a merger of La Prensa, founded in 1913 for immigrants from Spain, and El Diario which started publishing in 1948 for the Puerto Rican community in New York City.

Ramirez and his investment group El Diario Associates purchased the paper in 1989 from Gannett for a price just over $20 million. The paper had been unprofitable for as three years and circulation had declined from a peak of 80,000 to under 70,000. In the early 1960s, the paper sold an average of 100,000 copies per day.

With the addition of new technology and improved journalism, Ramirez was able to increase circulation to 68,000 by the time of his death in 1999 and to return the paper to profitability. Under his leadership, the paper won as Best Hispanic Daily from the National Hispanic Publishers Association.

El Diario Associates joined in 1995 with Latin Communications Group, a firm that operates 18 radio stations, with Ramirez running the business's print division and serving on the board.

== Death ==
A resident of City Island, Bronx, Ramirez died at age 52 on July 11, 1999 at Memorial Sloan-Kettering Cancer Center in Manhattan from pancreatic cancer. Divorced at the time of his death, he was survived by his fiancée, Pamela Merlo-Balfour, as well as by a daughter Christine, a son David and a granddaughter Angelica Gonzalez.

== See also ==
- List of Puerto Ricans
