= Carmen Montoriol Puig =

Spanish writer and translator

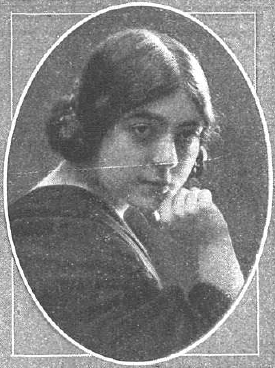
Montoriol Puig in 1913

Carme Monturiol i Puig (known in Spanish as Carmen Montoriol Puig) (Barcelona, 1893–1966) was a Spanish writer, translator, storyteller, poet, and playwright.

== Biography ==
Originally from Barcelona, she was born into a bourgeois family of Alt Empordà origin. On her father's side, she was related to the engineer and intellectual Narcis Monturiol; on her mother's side, she was related to writer and politician Josep Puig Pujades. She grew up in an intellectual and artistic environment, and received the typical women's education of the liberal bourgeoisie of the time. Since childhood, she felt a special fascination for the theater. She also studied music, and at the age of 20, began a career as a concert pianist.

Montoriol was also interested in writing, and wrote her first poems around 1920, some of which were published in magazines. Reading her poetry in public sparked an interest in languages, prompting her to teach the first Catalan language courses taught at the Pompeu Fabra Institute of Catalan Studies. In addition to Catalan and Castilian, she learned French, English, German, and Italian. Knowledge of these languages, led her to appreciate the great European thinkers and writers, and many times to translate, for the sheer pleasure of it. In 1928, she published the Catalan translation of the sonnets of Shakespeare, in verse, respecting the original structure. A translation of the works of Pompeu Fabra appeared in 1928 and caused a stir among the Catalan intellectual world because of the difficulty project. Being one of the first women who wrote plays in Catalonia, she quickly became renowned among critics and the public. Having feminist convictions, she participated in cultural revitalization as a lecturer and head of the Lyceum Club of Barcelona.

== Musical career ==
She studied music with maestro Vidiella and after perfecting the instrument with Frank Marshall, she began her career as a concert pianist over the years, as a soloist and with a trio together with her sister Lina Montoriol -or Jacinta Torner- on the violin, Montserrat Cassadó on the violoncello, and herself on the piano. She performs - alone or with this trio - in various venues in Catalonia, including the Palau de la Música Catalana with critical acclaim. She also performs with Aurora Bertrana in violoncel and piano sonatas.

== Selected works ==
- Quaresma, 1921
- Teresa o la vida amorosa d'una dona, 1932
- Diumenge de juliol, 1936
- L'abisme, 1930
- L'huracà, 1935
- Avarícia, 1936
- Tempesta esvaïda, 1936

== Bibliography ==
- "Filología moderna". N.º 13-20. Editor Consejo Superior de Investigaciones Científicas de España. 1963 (in Spanish)
- Manuscrits d'altres autors. Biblioteca de la Universidad de Girona (2013). (in Catalan)
- Callejero. Busca. Plaza Carme Monturiol i Puig. Interbusca.com (2013). (in Spanish)
- Escritores, Editoriales y Revistas Del Exilio Republicano de 1939. 2006. Vol. 9 de Biblioteca del Exilio, Col. Anejos Nº. 9, Renacimiento. Contribuidores Manuel Aznar Soler, Universitat Autònoma de Barcelona. Grupo de Estudios del Exilio Literario. Editorial Renacimiento, 1.149 pp. ISBN 8484722880, ISBN 9788484722885
