= Roger Bartra =

Mexican sociologist and anthropologist

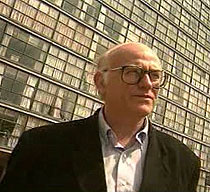
- Born: 7 November 1942; Mexico City, Mexico
- Scientific career
- Fields: Anthropology, sociology, cultural studies
- Workplaces: National Autonomous University of Mexico; University of London

Roger Bartra Murià (born November 7, 1942, in Mexico City) is a Mexican sociologist and anthropologist. He is the son of the exiled Catalan writers Agustí Bartra and Anna Murià, who settled in Mexico after the defeat of the democratic forces in the Spanish Civil War. Roger Bartra is recognized as one of the most important contemporary social scientists in Latin America.

Bartra is well known for his work on Mexican identity in The Cage of Melancholy. Identity and Metamorphosis in the Mexican Character, his social theory on The Imaginary Networks of Political Power and, recently, for his anthropo-clinical theory of the “exocerebro” (exocerebrum), that argues that the brain is partly constructed by its “cultural prostheses”, or the external socio-cultural elements that complete it.

Trained as an anthropologist in Mexico, Bartra earned his doctorate in sociology at La Sorbonne. He is an Emeritus Researcher at Mexico´s National Autonomous University, where he has worked since 1971. In 1985 he was awarded the Guggenheim Fellowship. He was also Honorary Research Fellow at the Birkbeck College of the University of London.

== Bibliography (in English) ==
- 2024. The Myth of the Werewolf, Palgrave Historical Studies in Witchcraft and Magic, Macmillan, London.
- 2024. Shamans and Robots: On Ritual, the Placebo Effect, and Artificial Consciousness, A Univocal Book, University of Minnesota Press, Minneapolis.
- 2018. Angels in Mourning: Sublime Madness, Ennui and Melancholy in Modern Thought, Reaktion Books, London.
- 2014. Anthropology of the Brain. Consciousness, Culture and Free Will, Cambridge University Press, United Kingdom.
- 2013. The Mexican Transition. Politics, Culture, and Democracy in the Twenty-First Century, Iberian and Latin American Studies series, University of Wales Press, Cardiff.
- 2012. The Imaginary Networks of Political Power. A new revised and expanded edition, La Jaula Abierta/Fondo de Cultura Económica, Mexico.
- 2008. Melancholy and Culture: Diseases of the Soul in Golden Age Spain, Iberian and Latin American Studies series, University of Wales Press, Cardiff.
- 2002. Blood, Ink, and Culture: Miseries and Splendors of the Post-Mexican Condition, Duke University Press, Durham.
- 1997. The Artificial Savage. Modern Myths of the Wild Man, Michigan University Press, Ann Arbor.
- 1994. Wild Men in the Looking Glass. The Mythic Origins of European Otherness, Michigan University Press, Ann Arbor.
- 1993. Agrarian Structure and Political Power in Mexico, Johns Hopkins University Press, Baltimore.
- 1992b. The Cage of Melancholy. Identity and Metamorphosis in the Mexican Character, Rutgers University Press, New Brunswick.
- 1992a. The Imaginary Networks of Political Power, Rutgers University Press, New Brunswick.

== Bibliography ==
English:

- Roger Bartra at CCCB
- Interview at Barcelona Metropolis Magazine
- Guadalajara International Book Fair Honors Roger Bartra
- Melancholy and Culture
- Roger Bartra at IMDb

Spanish:

- Roger Bartra at the site of the National Cultural Journalism Homage
- Interview with Roger Bartra on melancholy and culture, Barcelona Metrópolis, 2011.
- Biography at Fractal magazine
- La jaula abierta. Roger Bartra's blog at Letras Libres.
