= Anna Murià =

- Born: 21 April 1904; Barcelona, Spain
- Died: 27 September 2002 (aged 98); Terrassa, Spain
- Spouse: Agustí Bartra
- Writing career
- Pen name: Romaní
- Language: Catalan
- Genres: translator, literary critic, and journalist
- Literary movement: Grup Sindical d'Escriptors Catalans

Anna Murià i Romaní (pseudonym, Romaní; 21 April 1904 – 27 September 2002) was a Spanish Catalan narrator, translator, literary critic, and journalist who wrote short stories, novels, children's literature, and essays. A feminist activist, Murià i Romaní served as secretary of the Institució de les Lletres Catalanes, was a founding member of the Grup Sindical d'Escriptors Catalans (Union Group of Catalan Writers; 1936), and was an Honorary Member of the Associació d'Escriptors en Llengua Catalana.

== Early life and education ==
Born in Barcelona, Murià i Romaní was the daughter of the journalist and filmmaker, Magí Murià i Torner. She attended religious schools before studying commerce, accounting and English at the l'Institut de Cultura i Biblioteca de la Dona (1918–24).

== Career ==
Murià i Romaní was a relevant political female writer. She was involved with Acció Catalana, but joined Esquerra Republicana de Catalunya (Republican Left of Catalonia) in 1932, where she helped with the collection of signatures in favor of the adoption of the Statute of Autonomy of 1932 (es). In 1932, she organized the "Front Únic Femení Esquerrista" (United Front of Women from the Left) together with other relevant female activists and writers of the time such as Rosa Maria Arquimbau. In 1936, she joined the central committee of the Estat Català. Along with Ana María Martínez Sagi, Murià i Romaní was also a member of El Club Femení i d'Esports de Barcelona.

During the Spanish Civil War, she was an official of the Generalitat of Catalonia, where she acted as secretary of the Institució de les Lletres Catalanes (Institute of Catalan Letters), collaborated in publications such La Dona Catalana, La Rambla, La Nau, Meridià and Diari de Catalunya. She was also a member of the Women's Union of Catalonia and a co-founder of the Grup Sindical d'Escriptors Catalans (Union Group of Catalan Writers). While she wrote several novels, Aquest sera el principi ("This will be the Beginning"; 1986) is considered her major opus.

== Personal life ==
Murià i Romaní met her husband, the poet Agustí Bartra, while in exile in the Château de Roissy, a 17th-century building in France, which was offered as a refuge for writers. They had two children, a son, the anthropologist, Roger Bartra, and a daughter, the philosopher, Eli Bartra. Before returning to Catalonia, Murià i Romaní and Bartra traveled through the Dominican Republic, Cuba and Mexico. Muria i Romani died in Terrassa in 2002; she was a close friend of the writer, Mercè Rodoreda.

== Selected works ==
- Joana Mas (1933)
- La peixera (1938)
- La revolució moral (1934)
- El 6 d'octubre i el 19 de juliol (1937)
- Via de l'est (1946)
- El nen blanc i el nen negre (1947)
- Crònica de la vida d'Agustí Bartra (1967)
- L'obra de Bartra (1975)
- El meravellós viatge de Nico Huehuetl a través de Mèxico (1974, Josep Maria Folch i Torres prize)
- A Becerola fan ballades (1978)
- Pinya de contes (1982)
- El país de les fonts (1980)
- El llibre d'Eli (1982)
- Res no és veritat, Alícia (1984)
- Cartes a l'Anna Murià (1985)
- Aquest serà el principi (1986)
- Quatre contes d'exili (2002)
- Reflexions de la vellesa (2003)
