= House of the Seven Chimneys =

- Casa de las Siete Chimeneas (Spanish)
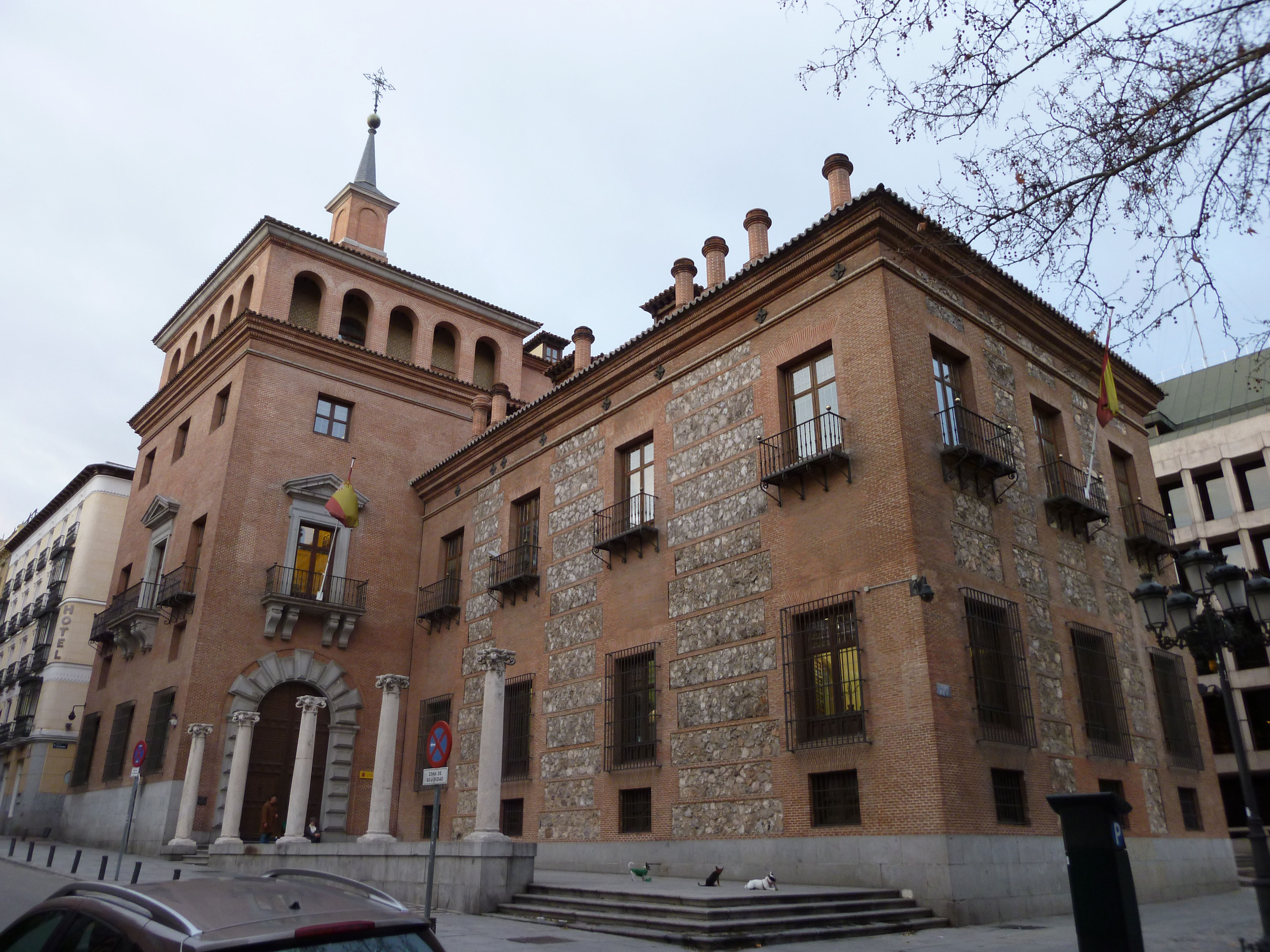

- Location within Spain
- 40.4202°N 3.69666°W
- Location: Madrid, Spain

Spanish Cultural Heritage
- Official name: Casa de las Siete Chimeneas
- Type: Building
- Criteria: Monument
- Designated: 1995
- Reference no.: RI-51-0009042

The House of the Seven Chimneys (Spanish: Casa de las Siete Chimeneas) is a building located in Madrid, Spain. It was constructed in the sixteenth century his name is house of cousins. In the seventeenth century it was an ambassadorial residence, being the home of Sir Richard Fanshawe and his family.

It is protected by a heritage listing, having been declared Bien de Interés Cultural in 1995.
