= Ernestina de Champourcín =

Spanish poet

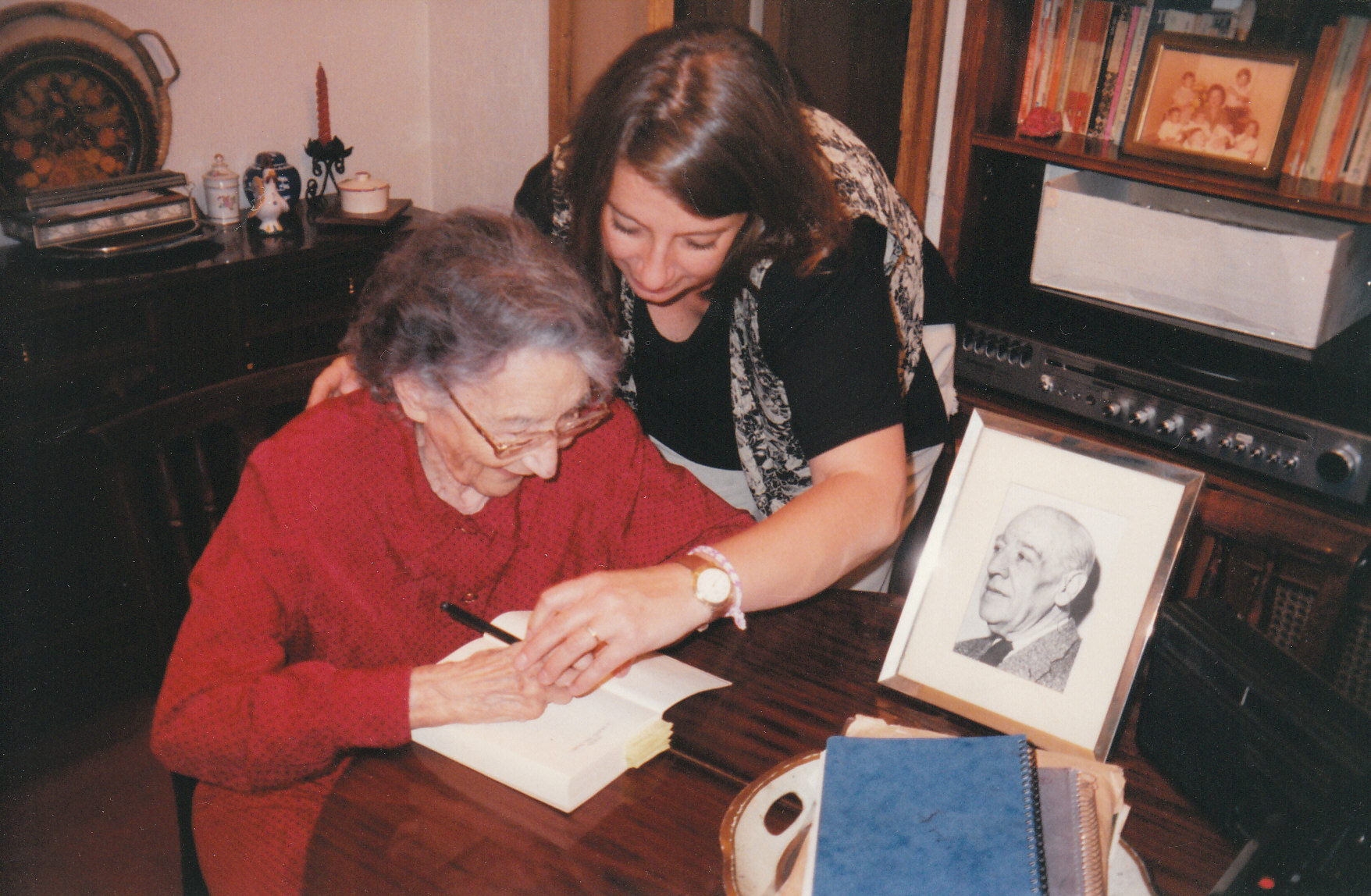
Ernestina de Champourcin in 1996

Ernestina de Champourcín Morán de Loredo (10 July 1905 in Vitoria-Gasteiz – 27 March 1999 in Madrid) was a Spanish poet. She is most associated with the Generation of '27.

== Early life ==
Ernestina Michels de Champourcín Morán de Loredo, was born into a Catholic and traditionalist family, which offered her a thorough education (she was taught a range of different languages) as part of an aristocratic and cultured family atmosphere.

Her father was a lawyer of monarchical ideas, and despite his liberal-conservative inclination, Antonio Michels de Champourcín possessed the title of baron of Champourcín, a title which pointed to his paternal family's origin in Provence. Ernestina's mother, Ernestina Morán de Loredo Castellanos, was born in Montevideo, being the only daughter of a military man, of Asturian descent, with whom she often traveled to Europe.

Around the age of 10, Champourcín moved, together with the rest of the family, to Madrid, where she was enrolled in the College of the Sacred Heart, received private tuition, and was examined as a free high school student. at the Instituto Cardenal Cisneros. Her desire to study at University was truncated due in part to her father's opposition, despite her mother's support. Her mother was willing to accompany her to classes, to comply with the existing standard for underage women.

Champourcín's knowledge of French and English, and her creativity, led her to start writing poetry in French from a very young age. Later, she would use this knowledge of languages to work as a translator for the Mexican publishing house Fondo de Cultura Económica, for about fifteen years (during which she stopped publishing poetry), even though her role as a translator is less well known in literary circles

Her love of reading and the cultured family atmosphere brought her into contact with the greats of universal literature from a very young age, and she grew up with the books of Victor Hugo, Alphonse de Lamartine, Vigny, Maurice Maeterlinck, Paul Verlaine and the great Castilian mystics, John of the Cross and Saint Teresa of Jesus. Later, she read Valle-Inclán, Rubén Darío, Concha Espina, Amado Nervo and, above all, Juan Ramón Jiménez. The figure of Juan Ramón Jiménez is of vital importance in the development of Ernestina as a poet, and in fact, she always considered him as her teacher.

Like the vast majority of writers of her generation, the first witnesses of her poetic work are loose poems published from 1923 in various magazines of the time, such as Manantial, Cartagena Ilustrada o La Libertad. In 1926, Maria de Maeztu and Concha Méndez founded the Lyceum Club Femenino, with a view to bringing women together and encouraging unity, so that they could help each other in the struggle to find a role in the cultural and social affairs of their time. This project interested Ernestina, who became involved in it, taking care of everything related to literature.

In the same year, Champourcín published her work En silencio in Madrid and sent a copy to Juan Ramón, awaiting the poet's judgment and critique of her first work. Even though she did not receive an answer, she came across Jiménez and his wife – Zenobia Camprubí – in the Farm of San Ildefonso. From this chance encounter a friendship arose between the two that led her to consider him her mentor, just as was the case, a little later on, with their other peers. Through her acquaintance with him she also got in touch with some of the members of the Generation of '27: Rafael Alberti, Federico García Lorca, Luis Cernuda, Jorge Guillén, Pedro Salinas and Vicente Aleixandre. In addition, thanks to her mentor, she came into contact with classical and modern English poetry (Keats, Shelley, Blake, Yeats).

In 1927, Champourcín began a stage in which she published literary criticism works in newspapers (especially in the Heraldo de Madrid and La Época (Madrid) . In these articles published before the Spanish Civil War she deals with issues such as the nature of pure poetry and the aesthetics of the "new poetry" that the young people of the generation of '27 were working on. She herself felt integrated into this group, as she shared the same conception of poetry. She published her first books in Madrid – En silencio (1926), Ahora (1928), La voz en el viento (1931), Cántico inútil (1936) -, which made her well known in the literary world of the capital. An evolution in her work can be discovered from an initial modernism in the shadow of Juan Ramón Jiménez to a more personal poetry marked by the theme of love wrapped in a rich passion. Perhaps that is why Gerardo Diego selected her for his Anthology of Contemporary Spanish Poetry, from 1934.

In 1930, while doing activities at the Lyceum Club Femenino, alongside other intellectuals of the Second Spanish Republic, she met Juan José Domenchina, poet and personal secretary of Manuel Azaña, whom she married on 6 November 1936.

== The Civil War and exile ==
Shortly before the civil war broke out, Champourcín published what would be her only novel: La casa de enfrente (after this she only wrote excerpts for the unfinished novel Mientras allí se muere, in which she narrates her experiences in her work as a nurse during the civil war). The novel was eclipsed by political events that took place after the beginning of the civil war. However, this work represents an important milestone in the literature written by women, as the author uses a narrator-protagonist to provide a fine analysis of the upbringing, education and socialization of bourgeois girls in the first decades of the 20th century. This work allows us to consider Ernestina de Champourcín as a moderately feminist author.

During the Spanish Civil War, Juan Ramón and his wife, Zenobia Camprubí, concerned about orphaned or abandoned children, founded a kind of committee called the "Junta de Protección de Menores". Ernestina de Champourcín joined as a nurse, but due to problems with some militiamen she had to leave and enter the hospital run by Lola Azaña as a nurse's assistant.

One of the consequences of her husband's work as Azaña's political secretary was that the couple had no choice but to leave Madrid, embarking on a journey that took them to Valencia, Barcelona and France, where they were in Toulouse and Paris, until, finally, 1939, they were invited to Mexico by the diplomat and writer Alfonso Reyes, who was the founder and director of the Casa de España in Mexico. This country then became the definitive site of her exile.

Although at first Champourcín wrote numerous verses for magazines such as Romance and Rueca , her creative activity was reduced due to her economics needs. During this time she worked as a translator for the Mexican publishing house Fondo de Cultura Económica and an interpreter for the "Association of Technical Staff of International Conferences".

However, her stay in Mexico was eventually to be one of her most fruitful stages, and she published Presencia a oscuras (1952), Cárcel de los sentidos (1960) and El nombre que me diste (1960) during this period.

Her mentor, Juan Ramón Jiménez, worked as a cultural attaché at the Spanish embassy in the United States, and other members of the group of 27 also went into exile to America, such as was the case of Emilio Prados and Luis Cernuda. During all the changes, their life was not easy. The couple had no children, and they endured their separation from their roots very differently. Ernestina's husband, Juan José Domenchina, did not adapt to her new life as an exile, and died prematurely in 1959; she, for her part, came to have strong feelings of union with this new "homeland". During this time her work took on a hitherto unexplored mysticism, and in 1952 she asked to join Opus Dei. During this time she wrote Hai-kais espirituales (1967), Cartas cerradas (1968) and Poemas del ser y del estar (1972).

== Return from exile ==
In 1972, Champourcín returned to Spain. The return was not easy and she had to go through a new period of adaptation to her own country, an experience that gave rise to feelings that she reflected in works such as Primer exilio (1978). Feelings of loneliness and old age and an invasion of memories of the places she had been in and the people she had lived with flooded each of her later poems: La pared transparente (1984), Huyeron todas las islas (1988), Los encuentros frustrados (1991), Del vacío y sus dones (1993) and Presencia del pasado (1996).

The work entitled La ardilla y la rosa (Juan Ramón en mi memoria) (1981) is an annotated selection of her correspondence with Zenobia Camprubí, published by the Zenobia-Juan Ramón Jiménez Foundation as Los libros de Fausto . Zenobia, for her part, published a small and revealing book entitled Vivir con Juan Ramón , which condenses pages from her "Diario" from 1916 and its text Juan Ramón y yo.

== Death and legacy ==
Champourcin died in Madrid on 27 March 1999. Her personal archive is stored in the Archivo General of the University of Navarra and is open access.

According to Emilio Lamo de Espinosa, professor of sociology at the Universidad Complutense de Madrid and Champourcín's nephew, one of the reasons for the silence about the work of this Spanish writer is her mysticism. For this author, the intimacy of her work and the growing weight of religious poetry meant that she was not taken into account either for her great social work and her commitment to the republican cause or for her activities in favor of the recognition of the rights of women to be treated like their male companions.

It could be said that de Champourcín suffered the bad luck of the so-called " third ways ", since she was not clearly on the right or left, as was also the case in very different circumstances, with Ortega y Gasset, who was rejected by some as an atheist and by others as an elitist, and simultaneously accused of being on the right and being on the left.

Emilio Lamo d'Espinosa also considers that Champourcín's position can also be ascribed to her own personality, her independence, and her will to not be typified, categorized, or reified.

Even though we can consider Champourcín as the only woman who really was in a situation of equality with the other poets today called the Generation of ‘27, her recognition in Spain was slow in coming. Her admirers had to wait until 1989, when she was awarded the Euskadi Prize for Literature in Castilian in the Poetry modality is granted to her (1989), which was followed by the Progressive Woman Prize, her nomination to the Prince of Asturias Prize for Letters in 1992 and the Medal for Artistic Merit of Madrid City Council in 1997.

== Stages in her poetry ==
=== First stage: poetry of human love ===
Ernestina's work is divided into three stages, two of which are very clear. A first stage, that of the poetry of human love, includes the four books published before the civil war: from En silencio (1926) to Cántico inútil (1936). In these works the author evolves from origins that could be described as pertaining to late-romanticism and modernism to a “pure poetry” very close to that of Juan Ramón Jiménez.

=== Second stage: poetry of divine love ===
This stage is separated from the previous stage by a period characterised by a gap in her writing at the beginning of her exile in Mexico, resulting from her need to work to earn a living. After this period of literary silence came the stage of the poetry of divine love (1936–1974) . This begins with Presencia a oscuras (1952), a work that represents a new thematic focus in her poetry. The theme shifts from human love to divine love. During this period, the protagonist of El nombre que me diste... (1960), Cárcel (1964), Hai-kais espirituales (1967), Cartas cerradas (1968) and Poemas del ser y del estar (1972), expresses deep religious concerns.

=== Third stage: poetry of the memory of love ===
The stage of the poetry of the memory of love (1974–1991) begins with her return from exile, at which time new concerns arose for the author: namely to be able to adapt to her new situation, and to be reunited with places both known and unrecognizable. Her final books, like Huyeron todas las islas (1988), are a memory and an epilogue of a poetry that is both intimate and transcendent.

== Works ==
- En silencio. Madrid, Espasa-Calpe, 1926.
- Ahora. Madrid, Imprenta Brass, 1928.
- La voz en el viento. Madrid, Compañía Ibero-Americana de Publicaciones, 1931.
- Cántico inútil. Madrid, Aguilar, 1936.
- Presencia a oscuras. Madrid, Rialp, 1952.
- El nombre que me diste.... México, Finisterre, 1960.
- Cárcel de los sentidos. México, Finisterre, 1964.
- Hai-kais espirituales. México, Finisterre, 1967.
- Cartas cerradas. México, Finisterre, 1968.
- Poemas del ser y del estar. Madrid, Alfaguara, 1972.
- Primer exilio. Madrid, Rialp, 1978.
- Poemillas navideños. México, 1983.
- La pared transparente. Madrid, Los Libros de Fausto, 1984.
- Huyeron todas las islas. Madrid, Caballo Griego para la Poesía, 1988.
- Antología poética, (prologue by Luz María Jiménez Faro). Madrid, Torremozas, 1988.
- Ernestina de Champourcín. Málaga, Centro Cultural de la Generación del 27, 1991.
- Los encuentros frustrados. Málaga, El Manatí Dorado, 1991.
- Poesía a través del tiempo. Barcelona, Anthropos, 1991.
- Del vacío y sus dones. Madrid, Torremozas, 1993.
- Presencia del pasado (1994–1995) . Málaga, Poesía circulante, núm. 7, 1996.
- Cántico inútil, Cartas cerradas, Primer exilio, Huyeron todas las islas. Málaga, Centro Cultural de la Generación del 27, 1997.
- Epistolario (1927–1995) (2007). Correspondencia con Carmen Conde. Edición a cargo de Rosa Fernández Urtasun. ISBN 978-84-9740-235-4.
- Poesía esencial (2008). Fundación Banco Santander. Colección Obra Fundamental. ISBN 978-84-89913-90-5.
- Al fin de la tarde

== Sources ==
- Bleiberg, Germán (1 January 1993). Dictionary of the Literature of the Iberian Peninsula. Greenwood Publishing Group. ISBN 978-0-313-28731-2.
- Wilcox, John Chapman (1 January 1997). Women Poets of Spain, 1860-1990: Toward a Gynocentric Vision. University of Illinois Press. ISBN 978-0-252-06559-0.
- Fernández-Medina, Nicolás. "From Earthly Passions to Spiritual Transcendence: Ernestina de Champourcin's Symbolic Poetry, 1926–1936," 2005.
