= El Diario La Prensa =

Spanish-language newspaper

El Diario Nueva York

- Front page of El Diario Nueva York
- Type: Daily newspaper
- Format: Tabloid
- Owner(s): ImpreMedia
- Editor: Carmen Villavicencio
- Founded: 1913; 112 years ago
- Political alignment: Moderate
- Language: Spanish
- Headquarters: 7th Floor; 15 MetroTech Center; Downtown Brooklyn, New York City, New York, U.S.
- Circulation: 35,615 daily 22,817 Sunday (as of 2012)
- ISSN: 0742-9428
- Website: eldiariony.com

El Diario Nueva York is the largest and the oldest Spanish-language daily newspaper in the United States. Published by ImpreMedia, the paper covers local, national and international news with an emphasis on Latin America, as well as human-interest stories, politics, business and technology, health, entertainment, and sports. El Diario Nueva York currently has 294,769 daily readers and 676,570 unique readers each week. Online, it reaches over 5 million users monthly, and it has more than 800,000 followers in social networks.

The paper's offices are located on the 7th floor of 15 Brooklyn Commons in Downtown Brooklyn, New York City.

== History ==
The newspaper was created in 1963 through the merger of El Diario de Nueva York (established 1947) and La Prensa (established as a weekly in 1913 by Rafael Viera and converted into a daily in 1918 when acquired by José Camprubí) when both were purchased by O. Roy Chalk. In 1981, Chalk sold the newspaper to Gannett Company, in a deal valued at $10 million.

The paper's publisher, Carlos D. Ramirez, and his investment group El Diario Associates, purchased the paper in 1989 from Gannett for a price just over $20 million. The paper had been unprofitable for two or three years and circulation had declined from a peak of 80,000 to under 70,000. With the addition of new technology and improved journalism, Ramirez was able to increase circulation to 68,000 by the time of his death in 1999 and to return the paper to profitability. Under his leadership, the paper won as Best Hispanic Daily from the National Hispanic Publishers Association.

El Diario Associates joined in 1995 with Latin Communications Group, a firm that operates 18 radio stations, with Ramirez running the business's print division and serving on the board.

El Diario Nueva York merged with the Los Angeles-based La Opinión in 2004 to form ImpreMedia. La Opinión is the largest Spanish-language newspaper publisher in the United States.

The newspaper has won many awards from the National Association of Hispanic Publications. In 2005, its awards included first place for editorial writing, political and cultural reporting, and feature writing.

El Diario's chief competitor is Hoy, a Spanish-language daily with 180,000 readers in New York. However, on February 12, 2007, ImpreMedia announced its purchase of the Hoy New York edition from the Tribune Company.

In 2010, long-term journalist Vicky Peláez, whose writings were critical of United States foreign policy and supportive of Latin American leaders Hugo Chavez and Fidel Castro, was arrested for working for Russia. The "Illegals Program" was a part of Russian influence operations.

In 2013, it celebrated its 100 years with a party at Grand Central Station in New York City.

In 2020, it was recognized as the Best Hispanic Newspaper with the Gold Award as Outstanding Hispanic Daily in the United States, the highest achievement of the José Martí Awards given by the National Association of Hispanic Publications (NAHP) during their annual convention.

== See also ==
- Media of New York City
- List of Spanish-language newspapers published in the United States
- El Especialito
