= La Dona Catalana =

La Dona Catalana ("Catalan Woman") was a Catalan language home and fashion magazine. It was published by Editorial Bosch in Barcelona between 1925 and 1938. Starting on 9 October 1925, the weekly periodical came out every Friday, although there was some sporadic irregularity. It was founded by a pioneer of Catalan cinema, Magi Murià (Barcelona, 1881 - Mexico, 1954). He came from a working-class family whose social status was modest, but he learned French, film and journalism on his own. His daughter, the writer Anna Murià, wrote her first article for the magazine using the pseudonym "Roser Català"; even her father did not know who was the author of that article. A total of 681 issues were published. La Dona Catalana's last issue occurred on 16 December 1938, when Franco's troops began the Catalonia Offensive.
