= Agustí Bartra =

Catalan writer (1908–1982)

- Born: 1908; Barcelona, Spain
- Died: 1982 (aged 73–74); Terrassa, Spain
- Writing career
- Notable work: Els himnes; Haikús d'Arsinal

Agustí Bartra i Lleonart (Catalan pronunciation: [əɣusˈti ˈβaɾtɾəj ʎə.uˈnaɾt]; 1908 – 1982) was a Spanish poet, writer, translator and University Professor in Catalan language.

== Biography ==
Descendant of a country family, he passed part of his childhood in Sabadell, although he had been born in the city of Barcelona 8 November 1908. When his family came back to Barcelona he entered to work in a textile warehouse. In year 1934 won a competition of social stories, and short time afterwards he started to collaborate in magazines such as Friend and Meridian.

He took part in the Spanish Civil War with the republican side, and exiled himself at the beginning of 1939: he passed through several refugee camps (Sant Cebrià, Argelers and Agde). He then met his wife, the writer Anna Murià, while in exile in the Château de Roissy, a 17th-century building in France, which was offered as a refuge for writers. They had two children, a son, the anthropologist, Roger Bartra, and a daughter, the philosopher, Eli Bartra.

In 1940 they embarked towards Dominican Republic, and left after to Cuba and to Mexico. In there, they fixed their residence and set up the magazine Lletres (Letters; 1944–1947). Likewise also made stays in the United States of America, especially between 1949 and 1950, 1960 and 1963, being nominated in year 1969 as professor of Hispano-American poetry at the University of Maryland.

In 1970 they returned to Catalonia; they settled in the city of Terrassa, where he died on 8 July 1982.

In year 1973 his work Els himnes (The hymns) was rewarded with the Prize Carles Riba of poetry, and in 1981 with the Cross of Sant Jordi (granted by the Generalitat de Catalunya). In 1982, Haikús d'Arsinal was rewarded with the Prize of the Criticism of Catalan poetry.
