= Aurora Bertrana =

Spanish writer and cellist (1892–1974)

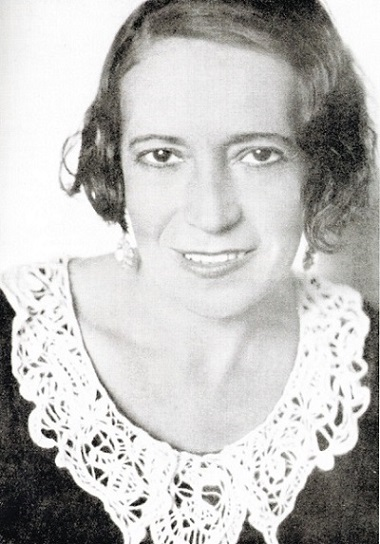
Aurora Bertrana

Aurora Bertrana i Salazar (October 29, 1892, Girona – September 3, 1974, Berga, Barcelona) was a Catalan cellist and writer, notable for her exotic stories and novels. She lived in Tahiti, Morocco, Switzerland, and France. Bertrana's republished memoires combining Memòries fins al 1935 (1973) and Memòries del 1935 al retorn a Catalunya (1975) provide a detailed account of her life.

== Early years ==
Born in Girona in 1892, she was the daughter of the modernist writer, Prudenci Bertrana. After finishing school in Girona, she wanted to be a writer, but her father opposed the decision and sent her to study the cello under Tomás Sobrequés, Girona's best cello teacher, then in Barcelona where she made a living playing the cello with a women's trio in the city's nightclubs. She continued her music studies in Geneva in 1923 where she earned a living playing in the Jazz Women ensemble at the Hotel Chamonix, the first jazz band made up entirely of women. Bertrana began a friendship with the exile Lluís Nicolau d'Olwer, who later encouraged her to write. During a performance, she met Denys Choffat, an electrical engineer, whom she married in 1925.

== Career ==
In 1926, after reading Le Mariage de Loti by Pierre Loti, she decided to live in Tahiti. As a result of that experience, she wrote her first book, Paradisos Oceanics. As a woman who wrote about mythical Polynesian women, she made a strong impression. Returning to Catalonia in 1930, Bertrana continued to write novels, lecturing and collaborating on various publications. Although her father had opposed Bertrana's writing career, they later collaborated by writing a novel together, dividing the chapters between them. L'illa perduda (The Lost Island) combined the elements of adventure and romance characteristic of the literature of the South Seas. In 1933, she stood as a candidate for Republican Left of Catalonia, but was defeated and left politics.

In 1935, she moved alone to Morocco to study Muslim women, visiting harems, brothels and prisons, after which she wrote Sensual Marroc i Fanatic. When the Spanish Civil War broke out in 1936, she returned to Barcelona, where she served as the editor of Companya, the women's magazine of the Catalan party. Choffat went to the Francoist zone and since then, they were separated. In 1938, alone, she became an exile. In Switzerland, she was a contributor to publications in Geneva and Lausanne. She wrote in French and Catalan, and translated into Castilian Spanish. Her experiences of World War II were captured in a collection of works, Camins de somni (Dream Roads), Tres presoners (Three Prisoners) and Entre dos silencis (Between Two Silences). For a time, she lived in Prada while visiting her mother in Andorra. Here, she had a relationship with Pablo Casals and Pompeu Fabra. Her novel Vent de grop (1967) was one of the first to be centred on the phenomenon of tourism. In the 1970s, the book became a film starring Joan Manuel Serrat titled La larga agonía de los peces fuera del agua.

Bertrana's recently republished memoirs combining Memòries fins al 1935 (1973) and Memòries del 1935 al retorn a Catalunya (1975) provide a detailed account of her life.

== Selected works ==
The DUGIFons Especials at the University of Girona contains a comprehensive online collection of published and unpublished documents relating to the life and works of Aurora Bertrana. Among her published works are:

- Paradisos oceànics, 1930
- Islas de ensueño, 1933
- Peikea, princesa caníbal i altres contes oceànics, 1934
- L'illa perduda (together with Prudenci Bertrana), 1935 (also La isla perdida, 1954)
- El Marroc sensual i fanàtic, 1936
- Edelweiss, 1937
- Fenua Tahiti, 1943
- Camins de somni, 1955
- Tres presoners, 1957
- Entre dos silencis, 1958
- La nimfa d'argila, 1960
- Ovidi i sis narracions més, 1965
- Fracàs. 1966
- Vent de grop, 1967
- La ciutat dels joves: reportatge fantasia, 1971
- Memòries fins al 1935, 1973
- Memòries del 1935 fins al retorn a Catalunya, 1975

== Literature ==
- Buchaca, Daniel Montañà i (2001). Aurora Bertrana, una dona del segle XX. L'Abadia de Montserrat. ISBN 978-84-8415-334-4.
- Gómez, Maribel; Bertrana, Aurora: Encís pel desconegut, Barcelona: Pòrtic, 2003. ISBN 84-7306-847-5. (Catalan language)
