= Maria de Maeztu =

Spanish educator and feminist

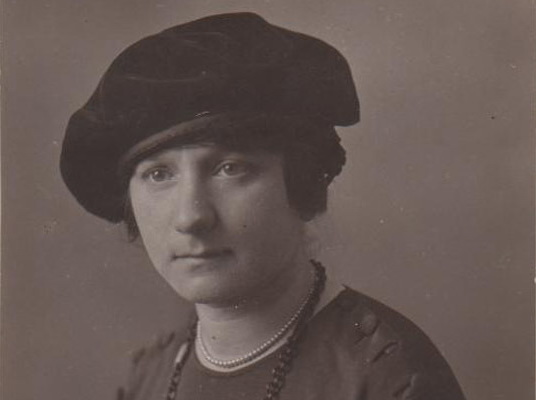
María de Maeztu in 1923.

María de Maeztu Whitney (18 July 1882, Vitoria - 7 January 1948, Mar del Plata, Argentina) was a Spanish educator, feminist, founder of the Residencia de Señoritas and the Lyceum Club in Madrid. She was sister of the writer, journalist and occasional diplomat, Ramiro de Maeztu and the painter Gustavo de Maeztu.

== Early life ==
María was the fourth of five children born in Vitoria the capital of the Basque province of Álava. Her father, Manuel de Maeztu Rodríguez was a Cuban engineer and landowner from Navarre who had met her mother, Joan Whitney, the daughter of a British diplomat in Paris, when she was sixteen. María's parents never married. In 1889 the unexpected death of her father in Cuba led to confusing administrative problems and the family was left in ruins. Her mother, a fragile but enterprising woman with a strong personality, took her three sons and two daughters to Bilbao and, in 1891, set up a residential school for girls to study French and English and improve their cultural skills. María started teaching at her mother's Anglo-French academy and then began to teach in the public schools of Bilbao. In 1903 she accepted the Ayuntamiento of Bilbao's post as director of the newly established night school for adults and also served as director of kindergarten (1902–1912). She created summer school colonies and focused on secular education which garnered her many enemies. Her fame became so widespread that, despite her youth, she was invited to share the stage with Concepción Sáiz, Miguel de Unamuno and other academicians at the Exposición escolar de Bilbao (Exhibition of Scholars) in 1905.

María was an eloquent speaker and her knowledge of languages placed her in a position to represent Spain at international congresses and to import examples of Anglo-Saxon feminist associations. Without interrupting her work in Bilbao she studied Philosophy and Literature at the University of Salamanca as an unofficial student of Miguel de Unamuno. In the summer of 1908 the Board for Advanced Studies sent her as a delegate to observe the Education Section of the Franco-British Exhibition in London. Later she went on a lecture tour of the United States, Great Britain, Argentina, Cuba and other Spanish cities including University of Salamanca, where she became a disciple of Miguel de Unamuno, and the Complutense University of Madrid where she met Ortega y Gasset.

== Residencia de Señoritas ==
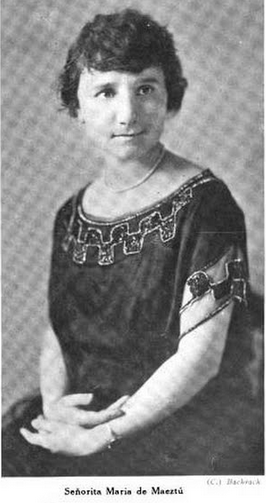
María de Maeztu, from a 1919 publication.

In 1915 María backed by the Junta para Ampliación de Estudios (Board for Advanced Studies) founded the Residencia de Señoritas in Madrid. Governed by the same rules as the Residencia de Estudiantes that had opened in 1910 for men, it became the first official center in Spain whose main objective was to encourage women's participation in advanced education, by providing accommodation for female students. She was its first director and with lectures, poetry readings, musical and theatrical recitals she attracted such intellectuals as Ortega y Gasset, Juan Ramón Jiménez, Victoria Ocampo, etc. as guest speakers. There Unamuno read his play Raquel encadenada (Rachel Enchained) and on 16 March 1932 Federico García Lorca read Poet in New York, his new collection of poetry not published until 1940. Lorca found the atmosphere pleasing and later held the rehearsals for his direction of Blasco Ibáñez's La Barraca at their auditorium. Other supporters and guest lecturers included, Rafael Alberti, Luis Jiménez de Asúa, Gregorio Marañon, and Ramón del Valle-Inclán.

== Lyceum Club ==
In April 1926, during the dictatorship of Primo de Rivera, she founded the Lyceum Club Femenino the first woman's club in Spain. Together with assistance from Carmen Baroja and Concha Méndez they modelled it after the Lyceum Clubs that were in existence in Brussels, London, Milan, New York City, Paris and The Hague. It was intended as a meeting place where women could exchange ideas and defend their social and moral equality as well as material interests. It opened with one hundred and fifty members who represented a well-educated group of professional women, including married women who wanted a broader horizon beyond the four walls of their home. With departments devoted to social issues, literature, the arts and music, science, as well as international affairs, the group sponsored lectures, concerts, exhibitions, and a variety of literary tributes. They advocated for reformation of women's legal status and the creation of day-care centers for working women. Members included Ernestina de Champourcín, Elena Fortún, María Goyri, María Lejárraga, María Teresa León, Carmen Monne Baroja, Margarita Nelkin and Mabel Pérez de Ayala. Isabel Oyarzábal and Victoria Kent were vice-presidents and the secretary was Zenobia Camprubí. Princess Victoria Eugenie and María del Rosario de Silva, Duchess of Alba held the honorary presidency. The Lyceum proved to be very popular and by 1929 its membership had increased to 450, prompting the establishment of a branch in Barcelona in 1931. Conservative opposition flared up with religious groups and publications condemning the club on its liberal political ideas, its library and what they regarded as its threat to marriage, family, and the Church. One priest declared that, "Society should lock them up as mad or criminals instead of allowing them to speak up in this club against all human and divine rules. The moral atmosphere in both the streets and homes would benefit from the hospitalization and imprisonment of these eccentric and unbalanced women."

== Spanish Civil War and Exile ==
With the start of the Spanish Civil War on 17 July 1936, activities the Lyceum Club and the Residencia de Señoritas came to an end. In September María resigned as director of the Residencia and on 29 October 1936, her brother, Ramiro, a right-wing intellectual and member of the Generation of '98, was executed by Republican soldiers near Madrid. Stunned, María left Spain for Buenos Aires where she became professor at the University of Buenos Aires. Beginning in 1937, Maeztu lectured throughout South America and became the chair of the History of Education at the University of Buenos Aires. While in Buenos Aires, she wrote several books, including "El problema de la ética: la enseñanza de la moral" published by the University of Buenos Aires in 1938 and "Antología. Siglo XX: prosistas españoles: semblanzas y comentarios" in 1943. She returned to Spain just once in 1947 for the funeral of her brother, Gustavo. She died in Mar del Plata on 7 January 1948 and her body was repatriated to the family mausoleum in Estella-Lizarra near Pamplona.

During the Civil War the building of the Residencia de Señoritas was used as a hospital, nursery and orphanage, and in March 1940 the school re-opened as the Colegio Mayor Teresa de Cepeda under a more conforming administration that was less threatening and suited the mandates of the Church.

Throughout Spain, in Alicante, Avilés, Barakaldo, Elche, Estella-Lizarra, Estepona, Galapagar, Granada, Málaga, Puertollano, San Sebastián and Zaragoza, there are streets named in honor of María de Maeztu. In 2006 the Ministry of Development (Ministerio de Formento) in Spain commissioned the Maritime Safety and Rescue Society (Sociedad de Salvamento y Seguridad Marítima) to build seven tug boats known as the Clase María de Maeztu. In addition to towing vessels and helping boats in trouble, these tugs are used to fight fires at sea, combat marine pollution and salvage shipwrecks.

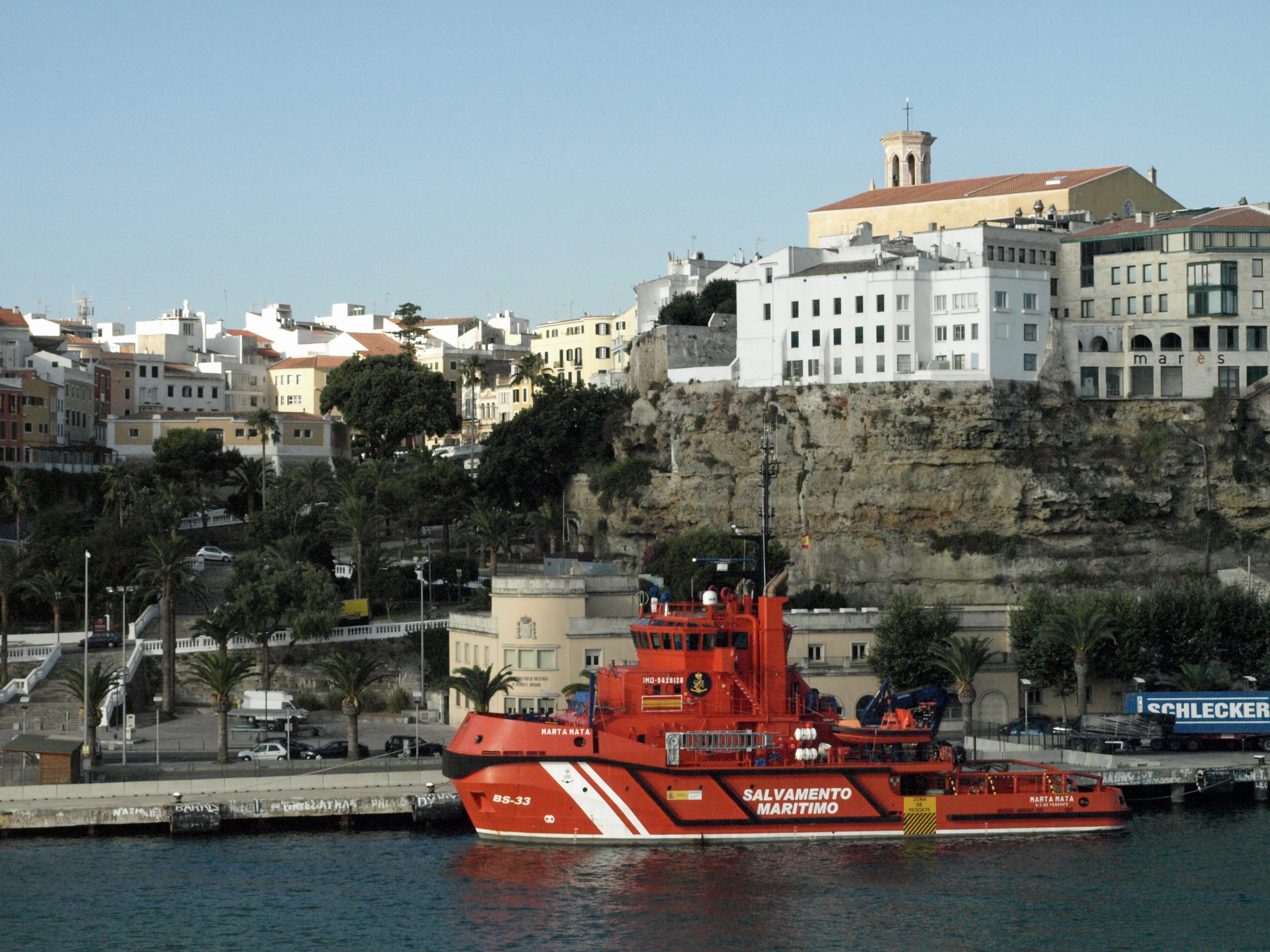
Tugboat Marta Mata (BS-14) from the María de Maeztu Class in Port de Maó, Menorca

== Writings ==
- Historia de la cultura Europea. La edad moderna: grandeza y servidumbre. Intento de ligar de historia pretérita a las circunstancias del mundo presente. Buenos Aires, Juventud Argentina, Bibl. de la Esfinge, (Libros para la Mujer), (1941)
- "La Pedagogía en Londres y las escuelas de párvulos" in Anales de la Junta para la Ampliación de Estudios e Investigaciones Científicas, Madrid, Impr. y Encuadernación E. Raso, (1909)
- El trabajo de la mujer: nuevas perspectivas: conferencias pronunciada el día 8 de abril de 1933, Madrid: Escuela de Enfermeras del Hospital Central de la Cruz Roja Española, (1933)
- El problema de la ética: la enseñanza de la moral, (1938)
- Historia de la cultura europea, (1941)
- Antología-Siglo XX. Prosistas españoles. Semblanzas y comentarios, Madrid: Espasa-Calpe, (1943)
- Ensayos de Ramiro de Maeztu (prólogo y recolección)
