= Pilar de Valderrama =

Spanish poet and playwright (1889–1979)

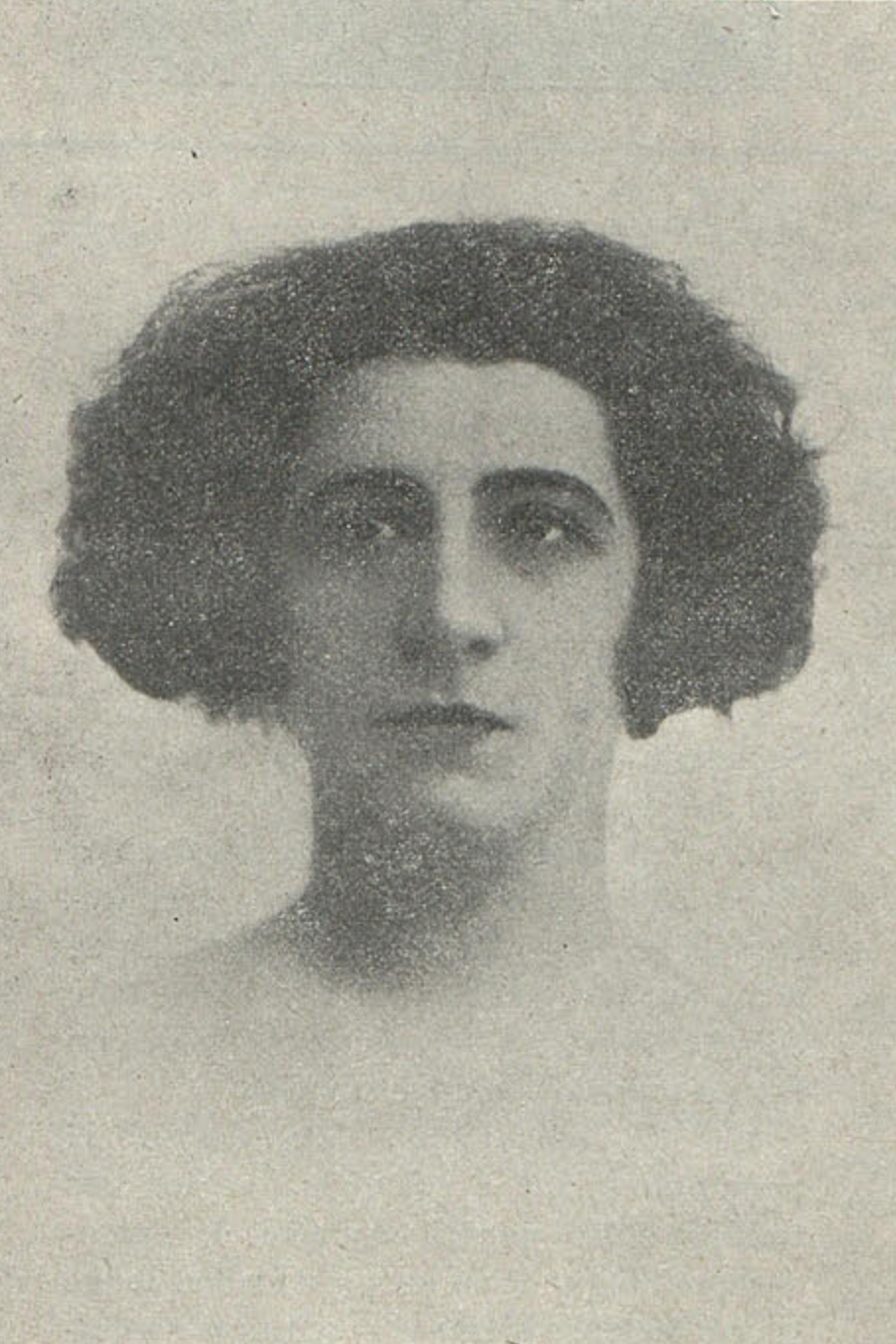
- Pilar de Valderrama in 1926
- Born: Pilar de Valderrama Alday; 27 September 1889; Madrid, Spain
- Died: 15 October 1979 (aged 90); Madrid, Spain
- Occupations: Poet, playwright

Pilar de Valderrama Alday (27 September 1889 – 15 October 1979) was a Spanish postmodernist poet and playwright. She was also known as Guiomar, thanks to her correspondence with poet Antonio Machado between 1928 and 1936.

== Biography ==
Pilar Valderrama, a member of Madrid's upper bourgeoisie, married Rafael Martínez Romarate at age 19. He was an engineer who directed the lighting of the Theatre of María Guerrero after the Spanish Civil War. The couple had three children.

From a young age, Valderrama devoted much of her activity to various cultural causes. She was a member of the Lyceum Club Femenino, where female intellectuals the first quarter of the 20th century met. She formed a tertulia with Concha Espina, Maria de Maeztu, Zenobia Camprubí (partner of Juan Ramón Jiménez), and other associates of intellectuals or artists such as Mabel Rick, wife of Ramón Pérez de Ayala. She liked to gather at her home with other figures of the time, including Cansinos Assens, Araujo Costa, Huberto Pérez de la Ossa, Ruiz Contreras, and Victorio Macho, a sculptor who had married her husband's sister. She also set up an amateur theater company in her house, named Fantasio.

Her work never brought her fame, but she became better known in 1981 when her identity was made public in relation to Machado's Guiomar (though some had intuited this as early as 1964). In her memoir Si, soy Guiomar. Memorias de mi vida (Yes, I am Guiomar. Memories of my life), published posthumously in 1981, Valderrama included the letters of the poet she "had saved at random". In her selection of memories and evocations, a short tribute to her thoughts of Machado, there is one that includes an offer of the poet to include verses from Pilar in the libretto of La Lola se va a los puertos, a play written in collaboration with his brother Manuel (who probably convinced the lovesick poet to reconsider).

== Relationship with Antonio Machado ==
Begun in 1928, the strange relationship between Pilar and the mature poet was kept secret until 1950, eleven years after his death. That year, a book by Concha Espina sought to discover its details, while protecting the identity of the person behind Guiomar. The document included photographic copies of fragments of the poet's letters, but Pilar's identity was withheld until 1981, with the deliberately posthumous publication of her memoirs, accompanied by the 36 letters she kept of the 240 Machado had written, and some of the verses dedicated to Guiomar.

=== Pilar's account ===
According to Pilar Valderrama, declared in several interviews, in March 1928 at age 38 she discovered her husband's infidelity and the suicide of his young lover. Natural spite and confusion led her to look for a break and solitude in Segovia. What does not agree is that she carried in her luggage a letter of introduction from a mutual friend and that, in her solitude, she agreed to an appointment with Machado (a resident and professor of the Institute in Segovia since 1919), inviting him to dine at her hotel, the best of the provincial capital. According to the Machado biographers Miguel Pérez Ferrero and José Luis Cano, the poet, at 52, fell in love from the first moment, even though Pilar warned that her married status could only permit an innocent friendship.

The relationship, allegedly lasting eight years, was limited to weekly meetings in Segovia or Madrid (first in the gardens of Moncloa and later in a separate cafe near Cuatro Caminos which they called "our corner" or the "cloistered corner"), complemented by secret mailings, at the rate of one or two letters per week. In all of his letters, Machado presented himself as "your poet" and called upon her as his "goddess". When they could not see each other, they agreed to keep an imaginary date at a fixed time by calling that moment of mutual spiritual communion "the third world" (Spanish: El tercer mundo), which Machado alluded to repeatedly in his letters and which was used by Pilar as the title of a theatrical work. As a result, Pilar explained in her memoirs that many misinterpreted them as real quotations, doubting the platonic character of their relations, which were corroborated by the complaints of forced chastity that Machado made in his letters to Pilar.

In 1935, Pilar used the insecurity of the streets in Madrid as a pretext to cancel their secret weekly meetings in the cafe of Cuatro Caminos, and thereafter only communicated by letter. This epistolary relationship was definitively ended in March 1936, when Pilar's husband – perhaps prophetically – thought it prudent to exile the whole family to Estoril, where closed borders at the time prevented them from continuing their secret correspondence (according to Pilar Valderrama).

Machado continued writing verses to Guiomar. Among them is the sonnet below – and in a certain way camouflaged – in his poesías de guerra. The sonnet, written in Valencia, is seen by many as the last of his secret letters to Pilar, whom Machado supposed to still be a refugee in Estoril.

De mar a mar, entre los dos la guerra
más honda que la mar. En mi parterre,
miro a la mar que el horizonte cierra.
Tú asomada, Guiomar, a un finisterre,

miras hacia otra mar, la mar de España
que Camoens cantara, tenebrosa.
Acaso a ti mi ausencia te acompaña.
A mí me duele tu recuerdo, diosa.

La guerra dio al amor el tajo fuerte.
Y es la total angustia de la muerte,
con la sombra infecunda de la llama

y la soñada miel de amor tardío,
y la flor imposible de la rama
que ha sentido del hacha el corte frío.

From sea to sea, between the two the war
Deeper than the sea. In my parterre,
I look out to the sea bound by the horizon.
You look out, Guiomar, to a Finisterre,

You look towards another sea, the sea of Spain
Which Camoens sang, dark.
Perhaps my absence stays with you.
Your memory hurts me, goddess.

The war gave love its strong edge.
And it is the total anguish of death,
With the ragged shadow of the flame

And the dreamy honey of late love,
And the impossible flower of the branch
Which has felt the cold cut of the ax.

It is interesting to observe that Machado never revealed their relationship to his mother nor to his siblings. At the same time, much attention has been paid to the detail of a paper found in the poet's coat after his death, scribbled along with Shakespeare's phrase "to be or not to be" a last Alexandrine verse: "These blue days and this sun from childhood...", and a quatrain of Otras canciones a Guiomar (a la manera de Abel Martín y Juan de Mairena), corrected as follows: "And I will give you my song: / Sung of what is lost / with a green parrot / that recites it on your balcony".

=== The crude reality ===
In fact, after the military coup of 18 July 1936, Pilar returned to Spain, to a house that her husband's mother had in Palencia and to the estate "El Carrascal", next to Paredes de Nava, where she had hurried to "recover" (in her own words) properties as a landowner after the occupation of the area by Francoist troops.

=== Pilar without Machado ===
According to some biographers, it was the estate of "El Carrascal" that inspired the name Guiomar, because it was found in the old manor of Jorge Manrique (whom Antonio and Pilar apparently both venerated), a Castilian poet who dedicated some verses to his beloved wife Guiomar de Castañeda. According to Pilar, it was at this farm where she received news of the death of the poet, months after it happened. It would also take some years for her to learn of Machado's last "sonnet".

Her pain or surprise at this are not clear. As early as 1938, within Spain controlled by the rebel army, Pilar and her husband, as members of the National Theater directed by Luis Escobar, went on tour presenting numerous works of traditional classical theater.

Residing in Madrid again beginning in 1940, Pilar de Valderrama had the desire to confide in her friend Concha Espina, who discovered her relationship with Machado in 1950. The novelist, with journalistic cunning, encouraged her to make it public "in the name of having better knowledge of the poet." Pilar, prudent as always, accepted on the condition of maintaining her anonymity. In this way the great poet's foibles were revealed with the pretext of "explaining at last" those verses that until then "were inexplicable". Pilar de Valderrama died in 1979, a few days after her 90th birthday. Her memoirs were published two years later and Machado's letters were donated to the National Library in Madrid.

== Opinions and judgments ==
Until 1950, the interpretations that literary critics gave to the meaning of Guiomar had no basis for the unknown person behind that name. In that year, Concha Espina's book identified her as a stranger to whom Machado directed the love letters that were made public there for the first time. And although with these keys the connection seemed evident, the information was so fragmentary that some biographers and scholars of Machado still attributed other meanings to Guiomar.

In 1981 the debate took a new turn with the publication of the memoirs of Pilar de Valderrama, in the title of which the author publicized her identity as Guiomar. She also provided, as proof, 36 letters of Machado's. Despite such evidence, there are still some theories that, through the philosophical work of Machado, Guiomar is an abstract philosophical entity closer to his wife Leonor, deceased in 1912 or that, based on the discovery of some poems to Guiomar supposedly prior to the date when Machado and Pilar met, conclude that Guiomar is but another of Machado's apocryphal imaginaries such as Abel Martín or Juan de Mairena, but further research has invalidated this early dating of these poems.

For their part, since 1981 when Sí, soy Guiomar. Memorias de mi vida appeared, most biographers of Antonio Machado have united in denouncing Pilar Valderrama for profitting off Machado's work. (Note: This is made clear by Pablo de Andrés Cobos, a friend, biographer, and scholar of the work of Machado, in a fragment of a letter addressed to María Zambrano. The letter, dated February 1964 in Madrid, says: I think I am certain in regard to GUIOMAR. It is indeed Pilar Valderrama. The substantive reasons are the same for Antonio. He was not libidinous and liked funny little blondes; It seems that Pilar Valderrama is the opposite. In a letter to Unamuno, (Machado) recommends a little book of poetry of Pilar and I seem to notice the displeasure with which he does. It is the girl who is fond of poetry who courts a great poet. Antonio, of course, does not reject it, plays at love and enjoys writing fiery letters. The letters are sent to Pilar, but the true destination is the immanent beloved of the two first sonnets of the theory of love. Marqueríe spoke to us the other day of a third love, with a girl from the street.)

== Works ==
=== Poetry ===
- Las piedras de Horeb (Sucesores de Hernando. Madrid, 1923). Her first book of poetry in limited edition of five hundred copies, with illustrations by her husband and cover by his brother-in-law, Victorio Macho.
- Huerto cerrado (Caro Raggio, Madrid, 1928). Her favorite book, which highlights readings of Berceo, Manrique, San Juan de la Cruz, Fray Luis, and Gustavo Adolfo Bécquer.
- Esencias (Caro Raggio, Madrid, 1930). With poems in verse and prose. Written with the knowledge of Machado, who reviewed it in Los lunes de El Imparcial de Madrid 5 October 1930.
- Holocausto (Artegrafia, Madrid, 1943). Dedicated to her son who died in youth. Prologue with a sonner of Manuel Machado.
- Obra poética (Siler, Madrid, 1958). Anthology, which also includes Espacio, written in 1949.
- Pilar de Valderrama (Guiomar), De mar a mar (Ed. Torremozas, Madrid, 1984). Posthumous anthology with some unpublished poetry, with prologue by Carlos Murciano, which in its title makes explicit her relationship with Antonio Machado.

=== Theater ===
- El tercer mundo (Teatro de mujeres. Three Spanish authors, prologue by Cristóbal de Castro, M. Aguilar editor, Madrid, 1934). Written before July 1930 according to Antonio Machado's testimony in one of his letters from that date.
- La vida que no se vive Not published, also before July 1930 according to the same letter by Antonio Machado. It was read in the Ateneo de Madrid in 1970.
- Sueño de las tres princesas, also unpublished, released in 1929 in her household theater "Fantasio".

=== Autobiography ===
- Sí, soy Guiomar. Memorias de mi vida. (Plaza & Janés, Barcelona. 1981). With the correspondence with Machado.
