= Alfredo Marqueríe =

Spanish writer (1907–1974)

- Born: Alfredo Marqueríe Mompín; 17 January 1907; Mahón, Menorca (Balearic Islands), Spain
- Died: 31 July 1974 (aged 67); Minglanilla, Cuenca, Castile, Spain
- Occupations: Literary critic Poet; Dramatist; Novelist<Biographer; Essayist
- Spouse: Pilar Calvo Rodero

Alfredo Marqueríe (17 January 1907 - 31 July 1974) was a Spanish writer who received his doctorate in Jurisprudence in 1928, but it was through his passion for literature that he made his career and built his reputation. During his lifetime he was particularly well known - and in some quarters feared - as an influential theatre critic. The middle and later parts of his career coincided with the decades of Spain's one-party dictatorship, during which time he was a well-networked member of the country's literary establishment. Born into a military family, his political instincts were conservative, but sources insist that his literary journalism was frequently comedic and generally unencumbered by overtly Francoist bias. His contributions to literary commentary criticism featured not just in newspapers but also on the broadcast media. In addition, Marqueríe's output included stage dramas approximately fifty books, including volumes of his poetry, essays and short stories. There were also approximately ten novels and at least two biographies.

== Biography ==
=== Provenance and early years ===
Alfredo Marqueríe Mompín was born at Mahón on the island of Menorca. His father, also called Alfredo Marqueríe was a soldier by profession, but also a sculptor and the director of a regional newspaper, "El Alcázar de Segovia", and it was in Segovia that he spent his childhood. The elder Alfredo Marqueríe was a literature lover who organised stage dramas, bull fights and circus performances on an amateur basis. It was from the experiences of his father's shows that the son acquired his own love of show business. However, Marqueríe was only 14 when his father was killed in action in Morocco, while fighting in the battle identified in Spanish sources as the Disaster of Annual.

At Segovia he attended the prestigious I.E.S. Mariano Quintanilla (secondary school) where his teachers included the popular poet Antonio Machado, who became something of a mentor. Marqueríe would later recall Machado with affection as having been very fond of wine and even, on occasion, "a little bit drunk". In 1922, soon after his father had been killed, Marqueríe started to contribute poems he had written to literary journals such as "Alfar", "Mediodía", "Manantial", "Parábola", "Meseta" and, above all, "Papel de Vasar". In 1926 he was one of a number of relatively young men who accepted an editorial position with Carlos Martín's recently launched "Heraldo Segoviano" (regional newspaper).

=== Literature: the vocation ===
He also found time to study successfully for a university-level degree and a doctorate in jurisprudence, which led in 1930 to a professorial appointment at the "Universidad Popular Segoviana". The career as a law professor was very brief, however. Marquerie's primary vocation always drew him back to literature. Towards the end of 1931 he accepted a job as editor-in-chief at the periodical "Segovia Republicana", in succession to Carlos Martín and under the directorship of Rubén Landa. At around this time he was placed second in a competitive exam for a senior local government administrative job ("secretarios de administración local") in the Segovia region, but his ambition to progress his career in journalism took him instead to Madrid where in 1932 he took am editorial position with the - at this time increasingly right-wing - evening newspaper Informaciones. He would remain an influential member of the paper's editorial team through most of the rest of the decade. After 1940 he remained engaged in newspaper journalism, but his contributions now concentrated on theatre criticism.

=== Politics ===
Meanwhile, like many in Spain, Marquerie lost faith in the recently established republican government during a period of fragmented politics and economic austerity. After 1933, in the evenings he was increasingly to be found frequenting the Falangist "ballena alegre" (literary circle) centred around José Antonio Primo de Rivera, which held regular gatherings on the ground floor of the "Cervecería Lyon". Some of the more high-profile of the other participants were the writer-diplomat Agustín de Foxá, the writer-commentator Rafael Sánchez Mazas and the writer Víctor de la Serna, along with the poet-politicians José María Alfaro Polanco and Dionisio Ridruejo. By being part of this circle of politically involved intellectuals, Marquerie had placed himself firmly on the right of the political spectrum by the time civil war broke out in 1936.

=== Wartime journalism ===
Marqueríe was in Madrid when war broke out. In September 1936 San Sebastián became one of the first major cities to fall to the nationalist armies commanded by General Franco. Very shortly after that, Alfredo Marqueríe relocated from Madrid to San Sebastián which became his home for the rest of the war, from where he wielded his pen in support of the Falangist cause. It is not entirely clear whether or how far he participated in any physical fighting. Franco-supporting magazines for which he wrote during this period included "Unidad", "Vértice", "Fotos" and "Domingo". He wrote a number of poems that were included in "Lira bélica", probably the best known of a number of Francoist anthologies of contemporary war poetry, compiled by Jesús Sanz y Díaz published in 1939. Elements in it had nevertheless already been published individually. Other pro-nationalist poets featured in the compilation included Agustín de Foxá, José María Pemán, Eduardo Marquina and Manuel Machado.

Meanwhile, at the end of 1937 the journalist Gregorio Corrochano made the journey from Tétouan to San Sebastián in order to recruit Marqueríe and Tomás Borrás to co-edit "España", a new Spanish language daily newspaper to be produced in Tangier, to be backed and financed by Juan Luis Beigbeder, Spanish High Commissioner in Morocco and, later, Spain's Minister for Foreign Affairs under General Franco during 1939/40. At the end of the war Alfredo Marqueríe became a deputy director of Informaciones, the evening daily paper which at that time was under the overall directorship of his friend the Falangist Víctor de la Serna. He contributed to "Poemas de la Alemania Eterna", a fashionably pro-Nazi poetry anthology. Particularly bizarre and, for post-Holocaust readers, shocking is his poem "Paracaidistas del Reich" which conflates avant-garde imagery with two thousand year old Christian symbolism. The aeroplane from which twelve German paratroopers "are thrown" in rapid succession, is presented as a metaphor for the Christian cross, while the twelve paratroopers themselves are equated, through a succession of far-fetched analogies, with the Twelve Apostles.

=== After the Civil War ===
Marqueríe was, in addition, a director of the short-lived weekly magazine Tajo during the early 1940s. He contributed "actively" to the (even shorter-lived) Spanish-Italian monthly review magazine "Legiones y Falanges. Revista mensual de Italia y España". Other pro-government magazines to which he contributed included "Festa d'Elig".

Increasingly, through his journalism, Marquerie became a well-known figure beyond the circle of Francoist intellectuals. Between 1944 and 1960 he contributed regularly, as a theatre, critic with the mass-circulation Madrid-based newspaper "ABC". He also provided theatre criticism after 1956 to viewer of the "TVE" (national television service), and then, between 1964 and 1973, for the Francoist mass-circulation evening paper Pueblo. His contributions also appeared in the Hoja del Lunes regional newspapers. He was editor-in-chief for more than twenty years, during the post-war period, with "No-Do" ("Noticiario y Documentales"), Spain's state-owned provider of cinema newsreels and government propaganda.

Although he was principally known during his lifetime for his contributions to newspapers, magazines, newsreels and television, it is clear from listings of his output that throughout the post-war decades Marquerie cultivated all the mainstream literary genres: essays, poetry, drama and prose-fiction.

He died in Madrid with his wife Pilar Calvo Rodero following a road accident on 31 July 1974.

== Prizes ==
Among the more noteworthy of the many prizes Alfredo Marqueríe received were the National Literature Prize (1934), the National Theater Prize (1953), the National Text Books Prize (1959), the Lope de Vega Sinnets Prize from Madrid City Council (1963), the Luca de Tena Prize and the Rodríguez Santamaría Prize.
