= Demófilo =

Spanish anthropologist and folklorist (1848-1893)

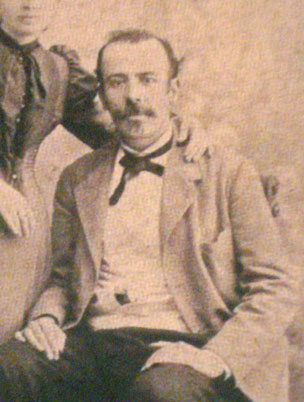
Antonio Machado Álvarez

Antonio Machado Álvarez, better known by his pseudonym Demófilo (Santiago de Compostela, 1848 – Seville, 4 February 1893), was a Spanish writer, anthropologist, and folklorist. He was the son of the noted Spanish folklorist, Cipriana Álvarez Durán.

== Biography ==
His mother, Cipriana Álvarez, was the niece of the writer Agustín Durán, author of a collection of Spanish narrative ballads (romanzas) of the 19th century. His father, Antonio Machado, was a university professor of Natural Sciences at the University of Seville.

Machado spent a large part of his life in Seville, where he studied philosophy and justice. His teacher, Federico de Castro, instilled in him an interest in evolution and the philosophical ideas of Karl Christian Friedrich Krause; later he became inclined toward the utilitarist social philosophy of Herbert Spencer. He temporarily occupied the chair of Metaphysics at the University of Seville and held office as a magistrate. He was appointed professor of Folklore at the Free Institution of Education in Madrid. He also participated actively in the Monthly Magazine of Philosophy, Literature and Sciences (1869-1874), with his first works on popular literature. Driven by economic necessity, he travelled to Ponce, Puerto Rico in 1892 where he held the position of Recorder of Property, although he was already in very poor health. He died on his return to Spain, on 4 February 1893, when he was only forty-seven years old.

He and Ana Ruiz had five children, among whom were poets Manuel and Antonio Machado.

== Career ==
From its creation in 1871, he belonged to the Sevillian Anthropological Society, along with his father and founder of this institution, Antonio Machado. Under the pseudonym Federico de Castro, he published Popular stories, legends and customs in 1872. His interest in folklore helped shape the magazine La Enciclopedia (The Encyclopedia) (1877), published decennially, and in whose pages he created a permanent section on popular literature.

As a result of the creation of the first society of folklore in London in 1878, he conceived the idea of creating something similar in Spain. On 3 November 1881, he published Founding of the Organization for Spanish Folklore, "a society for the compilation and study of popular knowledge and tradition". Thus the society El Folclore Andaluz (The Folklore of Andalusia) came into being, with the creation of regional and local societies based on the linguistic, geographic, and cultural peculiarities of the different regions of Spain. He established a monthly magazine of the same name in 1882, which was renamed El Folclore Bético-extremeño. It is still in print in several facsimile editions.

Machado had a modern conception of the new science folklore. He knew English, and translated some works of the anthropological discipline, such as one by Edward Burnett Tylor. Machado ventured his own definition of the discipline:

This is, for me, the science that intends to study of undifferentiated or anonymous humanity, to start off from an age that can be considered infantile to the present time.

In Madrid, he directed production of a collection of books of and about folklore, the Library of Popular Traditions (1883-1888), that eventually reached eleven volumes. He published a collection of enigmas and riddles, and studied the flamenco. His collection of flamenco songs was first anthology of this poetic expression.

He translated from English the works of William George Black (Folk Medicine: A Chapter in the History of Culture [Madrid: Editorial Progreso, 1888]); the classic Edward B. Tylor work Anthropology; or Introduction to the Study of Man and Civilization (Madrid: The Publishing Progress, 1887; and from the French, the second edition of the Research on the History and Literature of Spain during the Middle Ages by Reinhart Dozy (Seville: Administration of the scientist-literary Library and Madrid: Bookstore of D. Victoriano Suárez, 1872, two vols). He maintained a very active correspondence with Hugo Schuchardt, Teófilo Braga, and Manuel Murguía.

== Works ==
- Obras Completas, ed. Enrique Baltanás, Sevilla, Biblioteca de Autores Sevillanos, 2005, 3 vols.
- Biblioteca de las Tradiciones Populares Españolas, Sevilla: Francisco Álvarez y Cª, 1883-1886 (Madrid: Est. Tip. de Ricardo Fé) 1882 a 1888, once vols. Contiene: t. I: Introducción / Antonio Machado Álvarez. Fiestas y costumbres andaluzas / Montoto y Rautenstrauch. Cuentos populares / Antonio Machado Álvarez. II: El folk-Lore de Madrid / por Eugenio de Olavarria y Huarte. Juegos infantiles de Extremadura / recogidos y anotados por Sergio Hernández de Soto. De los maleficios y los demonios / de Juan Nyder, trad. del latín por J. Mª Montoto y Vigil. III: El mito del basilisco / Guichot. Continuación de los juegos infantiles de Extremadura / Sergio Hernández de Soto. De los maleficios y los demonios. IV: Folk-Lore gallego / E. Pardo Bazán y otros escritores de Galicia. Conclusión de los maleficios y continuación de fiestas y costumbres andaluzas. V: Estudios sobre literatura popular, primera parte / Antonio Machado Álvarez. VI: Apuntes para un mapa topográfico -tradicional de la villa de Burgillos perteneciente a la provincia de Badajoz / por Matías R. Martínez. Tradiciones de Extremadura / C.A.D. VII: Cancionero popular gallego y en particular de la provincia de La Coruña: tomo I / José Pérez Ballesteros. VIII. A rosa na vida dos povos / Cecilia Schmidt Branco. Folk-lore de Proaza / L. Giner Arivan. IX: Cancionero popular gallego y en particular de la provincia de La Coruña: tomo II / José Pérez Ballesteros. X. Cuentos populares de Extremadura / recogidos y anotados por Sergio Hernández de Soto. XI: Cancionero popular gallego y en particular de la provincia de La Coruña: tomo III / José Pérez Ballesteros. A partir del t. II el ed. pasa a ser Alejandro Guichot y Compañía. Posteriormente, desde el t. VII la colección es editada en Madrid en la Librería de Fernando Fé.
- "El folclore del niño", en España, 1885–1886, tomos CV-CI
- Colección de cantes flamencos, 1881; muy reimpreso, por ejemplo como Cantes flamencos recogidos y anotados M., Ediciones Cultura Hispánica, 1975.
- Colección de enigmas y adivinanzas, 1833.
- Estudios sobre la literatura popular, (tomo V de la biblioteca de Tradiciones Populares") Sevilla: Alejandro Guichot y Compañía, 1884.
- Batallas del libre pensamiento, 1885.
- Artículos varios, 1904, volumen I de sus Obras completas.
- Under the pseudonym "Federico de Castro", Cuentos, leyendas y costumbres populares, (1872)
- Adivinanzas francesas y españolas Sevilla, 1881 (Imp. de El Mercantil Sevillano)
