= Cementerio de San Justo =

Cemetery in Madrid, Spain

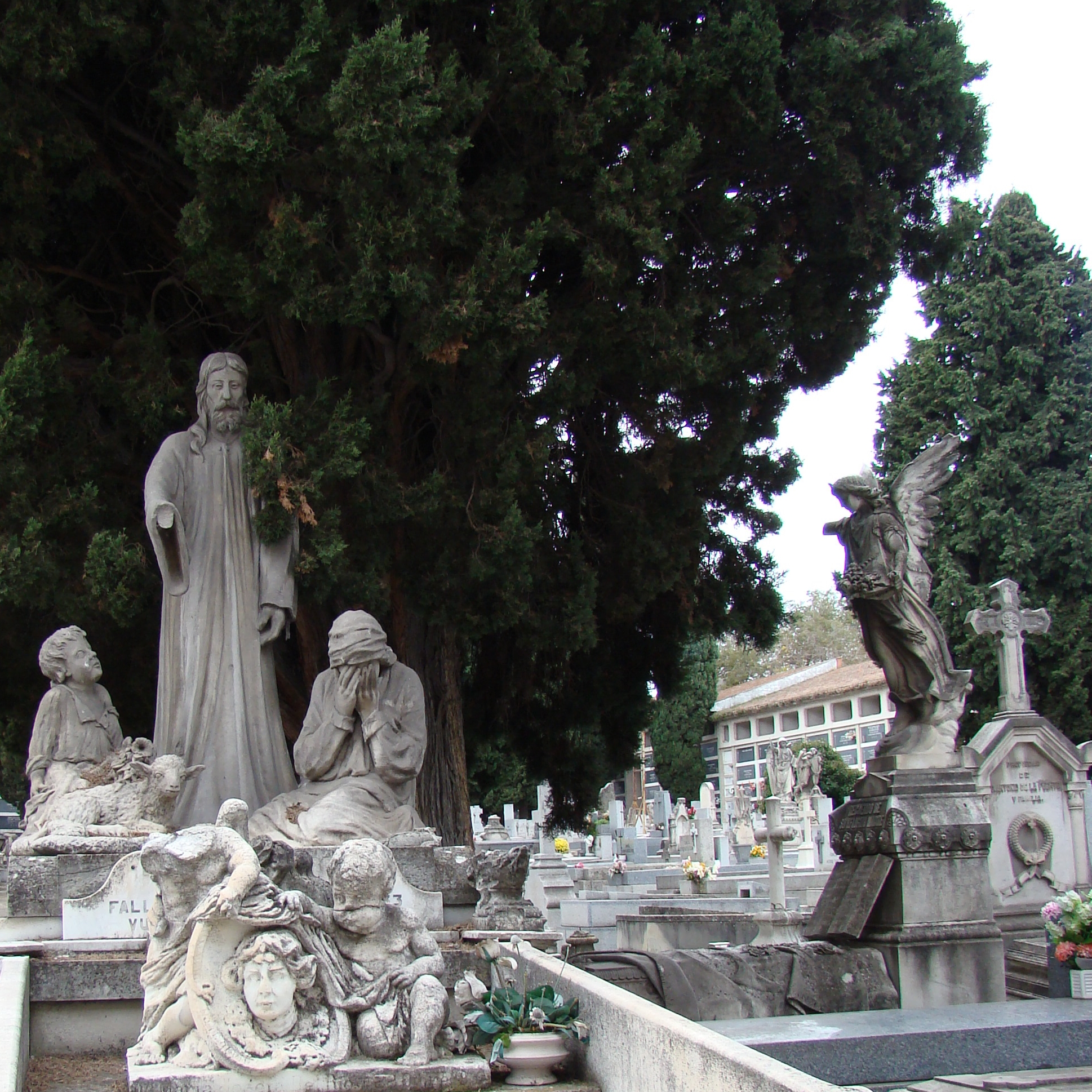
- Interactive map of Cementerio de San Justo

Details
- Location: Madrid, Spain
- Coordinates: 40°24′14″N 3°43′34″W
- Website: Official website

The Cementerio de San Justo, also known as Sacramental de San Justo, located in Madrid, Spain, is a cemetery near the Cementerio de San Isidro, which was originally called San Pedro and San Andrés. It is located between the Paseo de la Ermita del Santo and the Vía Carpetana, in the Carabanchel district. Its entrance is at number 70 of the aforementioned promenade of the Ermita del Santo.

== History ==
Its construction, which began in 1846, was completed by the end of August 1847. In 1847, it only had one courtyard—the San Miguel Courtyard, where the chapel is located and on whose altar is the effigy of San Miguel from the Franciscan convent of Los Angeles.

== Notable burials ==
This cemetery is the resting place of many famous Spanish people, including artists, journalists, poets, and singers.

- Pilar Calvo Rodero (1910-1974), Spanish sculptor, costume designer, and set designer.
- Carmen Conde (1907–1996), Spanish poet
- Elena Fortún (1886–1952), Spanish author of children's literature
- Ramón Gómez de la Serna (1888–1963), Spanish writer, dramatist and avant-garde agitator
- Mariano José de Larra (1809–1837), Spanish romantic writer and journalist
- Jerónima Llorente (1793-1848), Spanish actress
- Alfredo Marqueríe (1907-1974), Spanish writer
- Melchor Rodríguez García (1893-1972), Spanish mayor

== Gallery ==
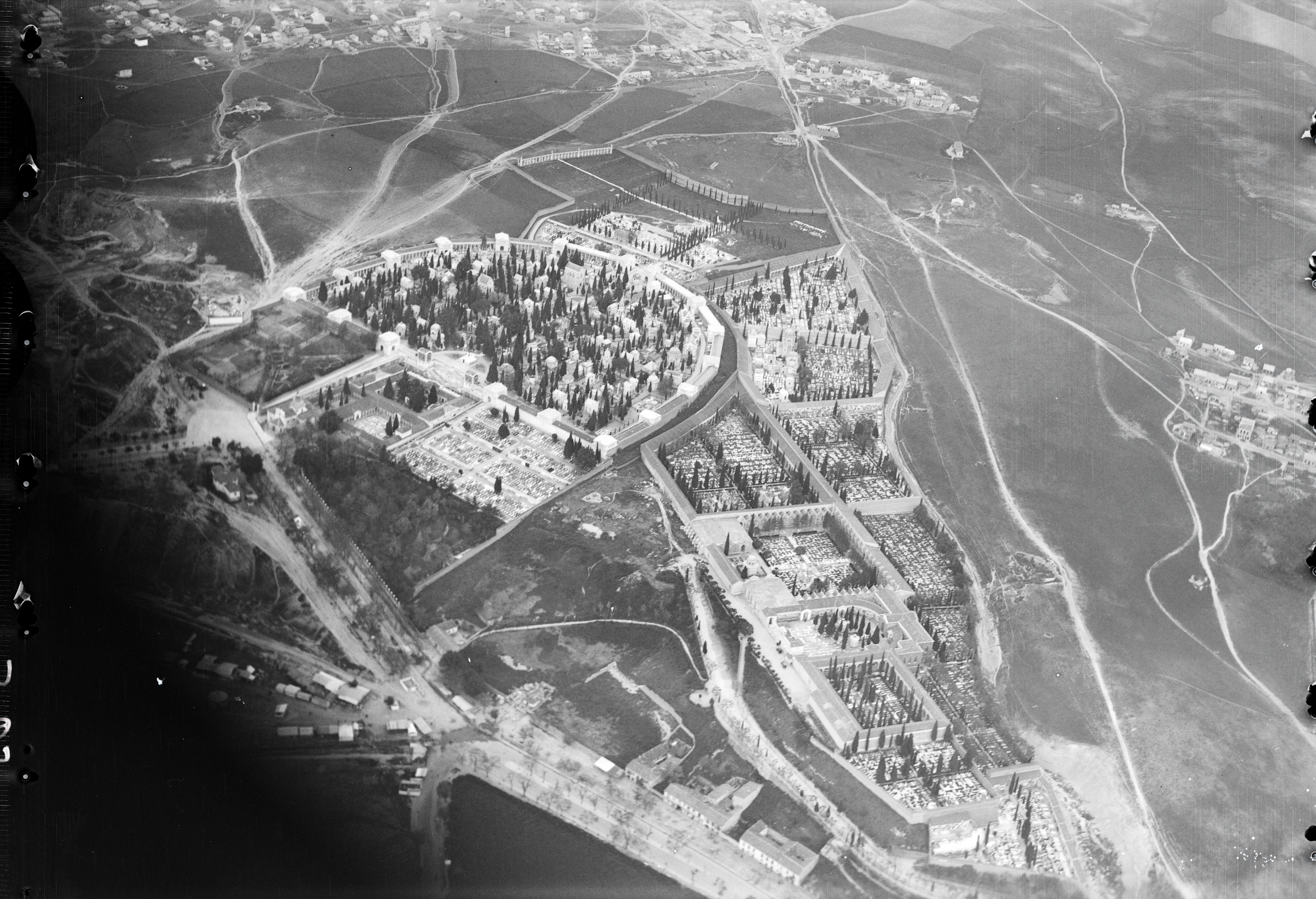
San Isidro Cemetery (left) and Cemenerio de San Justo (right) circa 1928

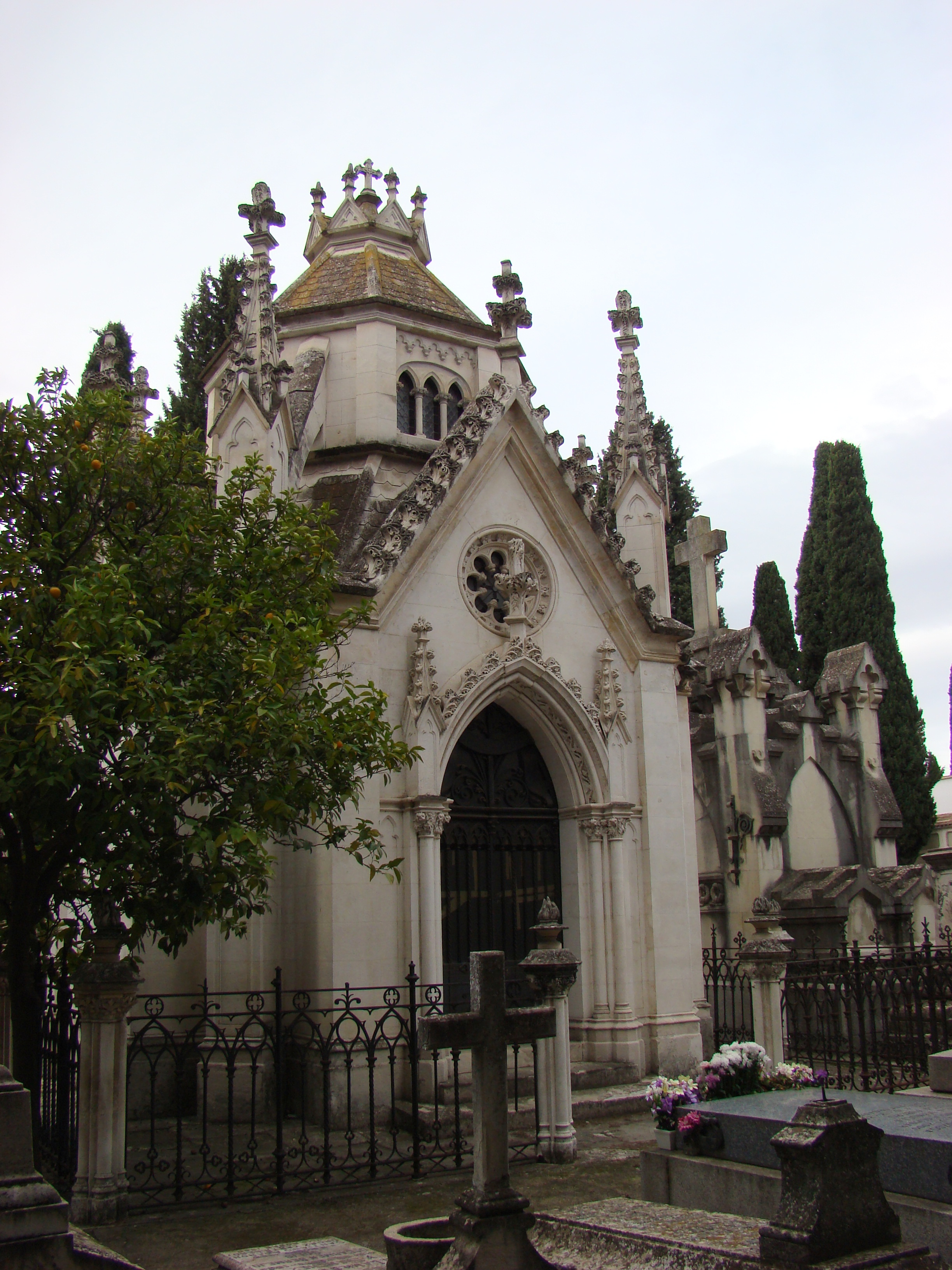
Neogothic style of the Capilla-panteón by the Campuzano-Querol family (ca. 1885), in the San Millán Courtyard

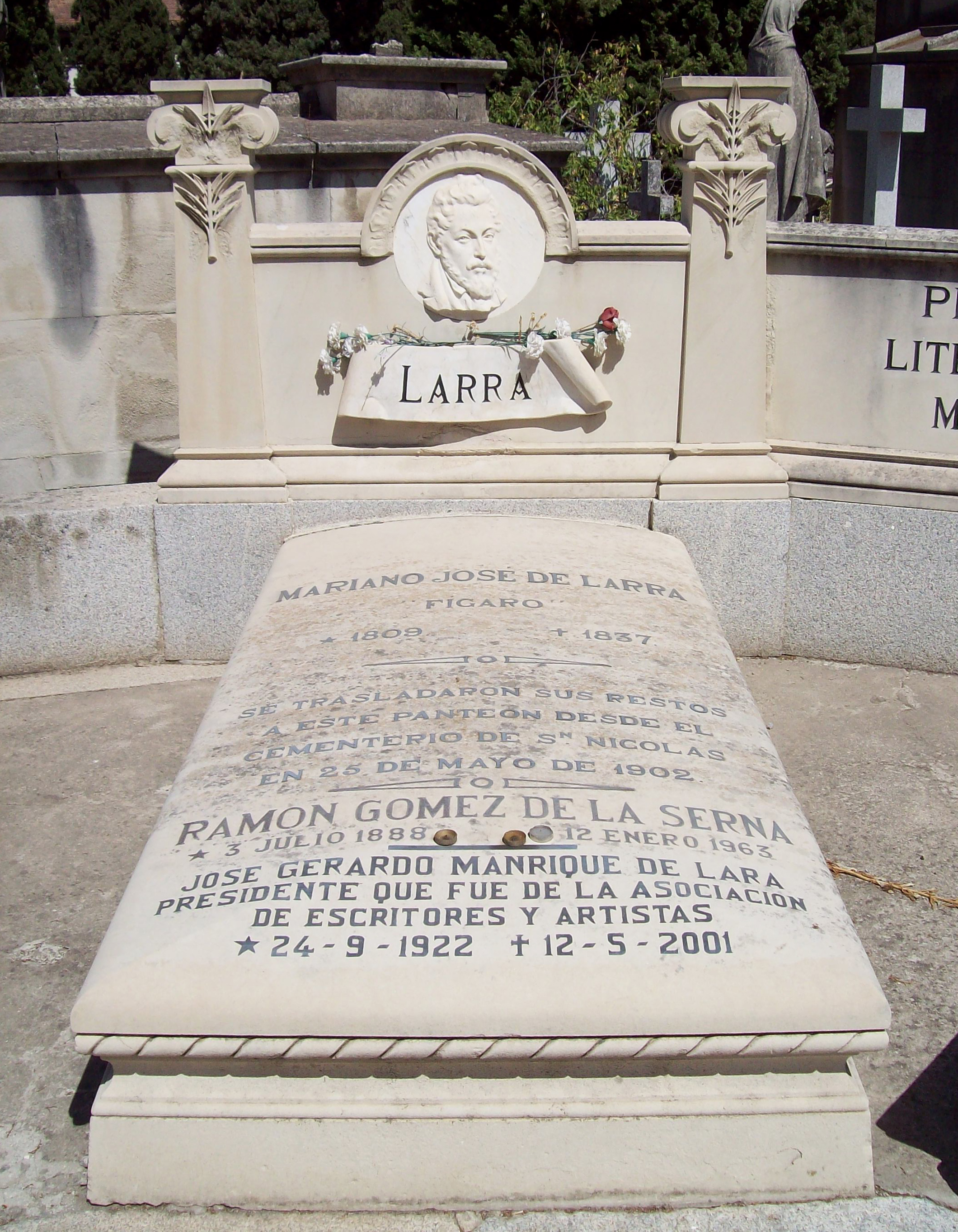
Tomb of Mariano José de Larra and Ramón Gómez de la Serna in the Cementerio de San Justo

== Bibliography ==
- Navascués Palacio, Pedro (1979). "Puerta del Ángel y Sacramentales". Madrid V.I (PDF). Madrid: Espasa-Calpe. pp. 301–320. ISBN 8423953718.
- Saguar Quer, Carlos (2002). "El cementerio de la sacramental de San Justo: historia y arquitectura". Anales del Instituto de Estudios Madrileños. XLII: 103–129. ISSN 0584-6374. Archived from the original on 28 May 2016.
