= Agustín Durán =

Spanish scholar 1789-1862)

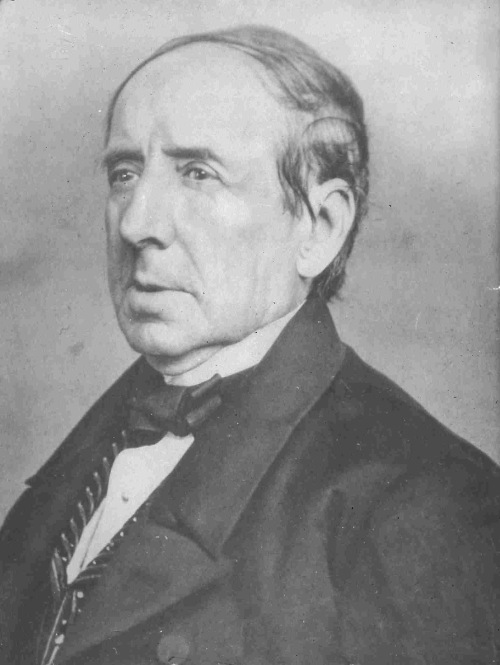
- Born: Agustín Francisco Gato Durán; 14 October 1789; Madrid, Spain
- Died: 1 December 1862 (aged 73); Madrid, Spain
- Occupations: Folklorist; Scholar
- Relatives: Cipriana Álvarez Durán, Demofilo
- Writing career
- Language: Spanish
- Genre: Romantic ballads
- Notable works: Discurso sobre el influjo que ha tenido la critica moderna en la decadencia del teatro antiguo; Romancero general

Seat d of the Real Academia Española
- In office 25 February 1847 – 1 December 1862
- Preceded by: Seat established
- Succeeded by: Enrique Ramírez de Saavedra

Agustín Durán (14 October 1789 – 1 December 1862), Spanish scholar, was born in Madrid, where his father was the court physician.

Durán was sent to the seminary at Vergara, whence he returned learned in the traditions of Spanish romance. In 1817 he began the study of philosophy and law at the university of Seville, and in due course was admitted to the bar at Valladolid. From 1821 to 1823 he held a post in the education department at Madrid, but in the latter year he was suspended on account of his political opinions.

In 1834, Durán became secretary of the board for the censorship of the press, and shortly afterwards obtained a post in the national library at Madrid. The revolution of 1840 led to his dismissal, but he was reinstated in 1843. In 1854, Durán was appointed as the chief librarian. The next year, however, he retired to devote himself to his literary work. In 1828, shortly after his first discharge from office, he published anonymously his Discurso sobre el influjo que ha tenido la critica moderna en la decadencia del teatro antiguo; this treatise greatly influenced the younger dramatists of the day.

He next endeavoured to interest his fellow-countrymen in their ancient, neglected ballads, and in the forgotten dramas of the 17th century. Five volumes of a Romancero general appeared from 1828 to 1832 (republished, with considerable additions, in 2 vols. 1849–1851), and Talía española (1834), a reprint of old Spanish comedies. Durán's Romancero general is the fullest collection of the kind and is therefore unlikely to be superseded, though the texts are inferior to those edited by Marcelino Menéndez y Pelayo.

Durán died in Madrid.
