= Ínsula =

Monthly literary magazine in Spain

- Categories: Literary magazine
- Frequency: Monthly
- Publisher: Espasa Libros
- Founder: Enrique Canito; José Luis Cano
- Founded: 1946
- First issue: January 1946
- Country: Spain
- Based in: Madrid
- Language: Spanish
- Website: Ínsula
- ISSN: 0020-4536
- OCLC: 13719853

Ínsula (Spanish: Isle) is a magazine based in Madrid, Spain which features articles on literary work and literary criticism, with the subtitle Revista de Letras y Ciencias Humanas. In terms of format and contents, the magazine is similar to the New York Review of Books, and its title is a reference to Spain's isolated status during the post-war period. Eleanor Wright describes Ínsula as one of the most respected independent literary magazines in the post-war period of Spain.

== History and profile ==
Established in 1946, Ínsula's first issue appeared in January 1946, with Enrique Canito as the founding editor and director. The Spanish poet José Luis Cano was also instrumental in the foundation of the magazine. He served as deputy director and then director of the magazine. It is published by Espasa Libros on a monthly basis, and its headquarters is in Madrid.

The magazine has two major periods, from its start in 1946 to 1988 and from 1988 to the present, and it focuses on Spanish literature and Portuguese literature. However, in the first period, the magazine frequently featured articles about British literature.

Both Spanish and international writers have contributed to Ínsula.

== Bans ==
Ínsula was subject to bans during the Franco regime. It was suspended in 1947 due to the publication of José Luis Cano's review of James Joyce's Ulysses. In 1956, Ínsula was also closed down by Spanish authorities due to its November 1955 issue honoring Ortega y Gasset upon his death in 1955. The magazine resumed publication in January 1957.

== Legacy ==
In 1990, a book entitled La Ínsula Sin Nombre: Homenaje a Nilita Vientós Gastón, José Luis Cano y Enrique Canito was published in memory of the former editors of Ínsula.
