= Leonor Izquierdo =

Wife of Antonio Machado

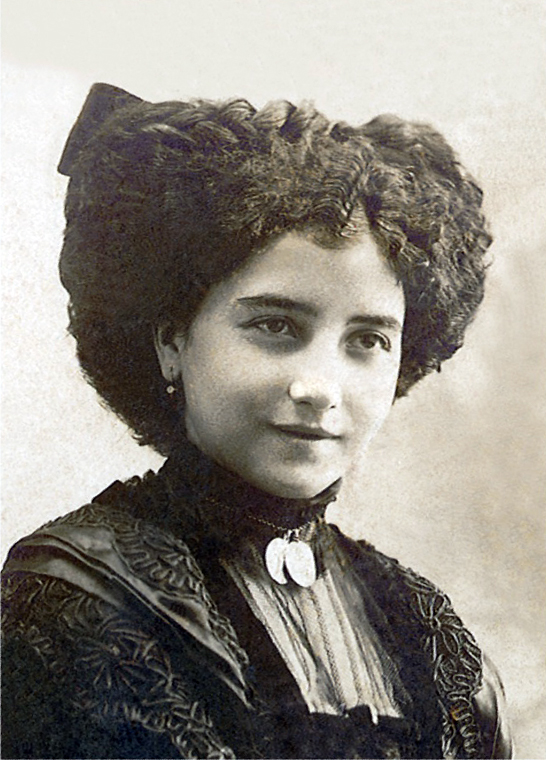
- Born: Leonor Izquierdo Cuevas; 12 June 1894; Almenar de Soria, Spain
- Died: 1 August 1912 (aged 18); Soria, Spain
- Burial place: Soria
- Spouse: Antonio Machado (m. 1909; died 1912)

Leonor Izquierdo (12 June 1894 – 1 August 1912) was the muse and wife of the poet Antonio Machado, who met her at the age of thirteen when he was working as a teacher in Soria.

Leonor was the daughter of Isabel Cuevas and Ceferino Izquierdo, sergeant of the Guardia Civil. She was born at Almenar de Soria where her father was based.

Antonio Machado agreed with Isabel Cuevas to marry Leonor. At 10:00 A.M. on 30 July 1909 they married at the Church of Santa María la Mayor in Soria.

The couple was living in Paris in 1911. After being diagnosed with advanced tuberculosis, she returned to Soria to get rest and died on 1 August 1912. She was buried there in Cementerio del Espino (Hawthorn Cemetery). Machado wrote a series of poems dealing with the loss of Leonor, but he never returned to Soria after her death.

Machado's friend visited her grave to put the next poem by the poet:

Con los primeros lirios
y las primeras rosas de las huertas,
en una tarde azul sube al Espino,
al alto Espino donde está su tierra.

Pick the first iris
and the first roses,
and on a blue afternoon go to the (Cementerio del) Espino,
high there in the Espino where her burial is.

== Bibliography ==
- Cano, José Luis (1986). Antonio Machado. Barcelona: Salvat Editores. ISBN 84-345-8186-8.
