= José Luis Cano =

Spanish writer, editor and literary critic

José Luis Cano (28 December 1911 – 15 February 1999) was a Spanish writer, editor and literary critic. He co-founded the literary review Ínsula in 1947. In 1948, he co-founded and edited the Adonais Poetry Collection which gives the Adonais Prize for Spanish poetry. Luis Cano was awarded the gold medal for Merit in Fine Arts (Medalla al Mérito en las Bellas Artes) from the King of Spain in 1985.

== Background ==
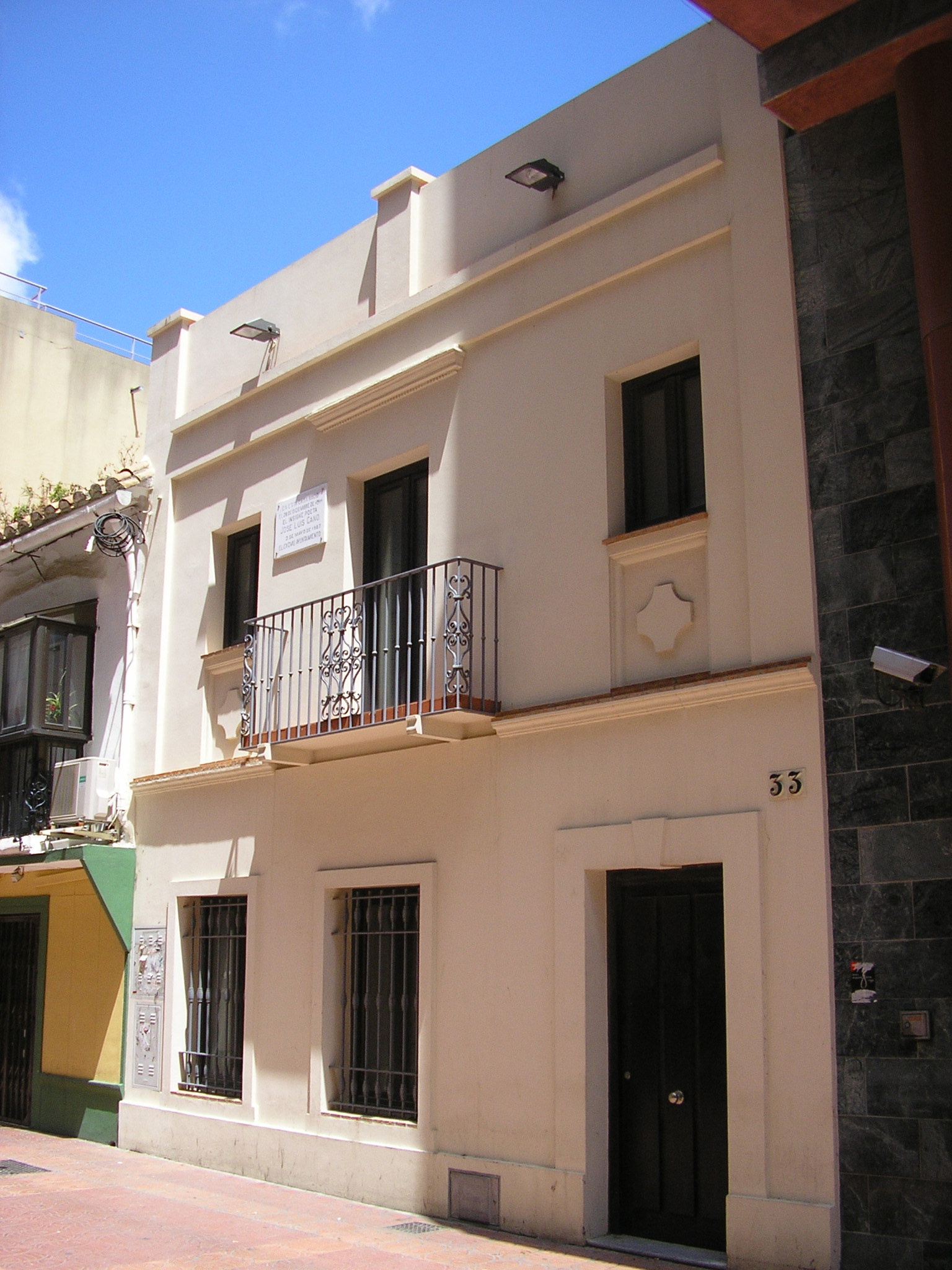
The house where José Luis Cano was born on Calle Ancha de Algeciras.

José Luis Cano was born in Algeciras in the province of Cádiz, southern Spain. He moved to Madrid in 1931, the year of the proclamation of the Second Republic, to pursue university studies. At the Central University he studied Law and Philosophy, living at Velintonia Street. At this time he met Dámaso Alonso and was reunited with Federico García Lorca, whom he had met in Málaga in 1930. After the Spanish Civil War José Luis Cano lived in Republican Madrid and there he met Luis Cernuda, Vicente Aleixandre and Pablo Neruda. Cano studied Vicente Aleixandre's work and published the writer's diary, Los Cuadernos de Velintonia (Velintonia's Papers). Luis Cano went on to study, publish and promote the poets who made up the 'Generation of '27', including writing biographies of Federico García Lorca (1962) and Antonio Machado (1975).Luis Cano especially championed Andalusia poetry.

José Luis Cano wrote poetry himself as well as publishing the work of others. His collections include Sonetos de la Bahía (Sonnets from the Bay, 1942), Voz de la Muerte (Voice of Death, (1945)), Las Alas Perseguidas, (The Pursued Wings, 1945), Otoño en Málaga y otros poemas Autumn in Málaga and Other Poems (1955), Luz del Tiempo (Light of Time 1962), Poesía 1942–1962 (Poems 1942-1962, 1964) and Poemas para Susana (Poems for Susana) (1978). Luis Cano was awarded the gold medal for Merit in Fine Arts in 1985.

The City Council of Algeciras, in recognition of his work, formed the José Luis Cano Municipal Foundation of Culture. In 2001 this foundation published Jose Luis Cano's Complete Poems and in 2002 Los Cuadernos de Velintonia (Velintonia's Papers), both Alejandro Sanz editions.

In March 1995, José Luis Cano became involved in the campaign to protect the home of Vicente Aleixandre at 3 Velintonia Street and support the property since the poet's death. The Association of Vicente Aleixandre's Friends promote the work and memory of the writer and Nobel Prize winner (1984), a leading light of the 'Generation of '27'

José Luis Cano died in Madrid in 1999.

== Selected works ==
- 1942 Sonetos de la bahía (Sonnets of the bay)
- 1945 Voz de la muerte (Voice of death)
- 1945 Las alas perseguidoras (The Pursued Wings)
- 1955 Otoño en Málaga y otros poemas (Autumn in Málaga and other poems)
- 1962 Luz del tiempo (Light of time)
- 1964 Poesía. 1942-1962 (Poetry 1942-1962)
- 1978 Poemas para Susana (poems for Suzanna)
- La generación del 27 (The generation of '27)
- Antonio Machado : biografia ilustrada. (Antonio Machado: an illustrated biography)
- Vicente Aleixandre
- Antología de la nueva poesía española (An anthology of new Spanish poetry)
- García Lorca
- García Lorca: biografía ilustrada (García Lorca: an illustrated biography)
