= Cipriana Álvarez Durán =

Spanish painter and writer

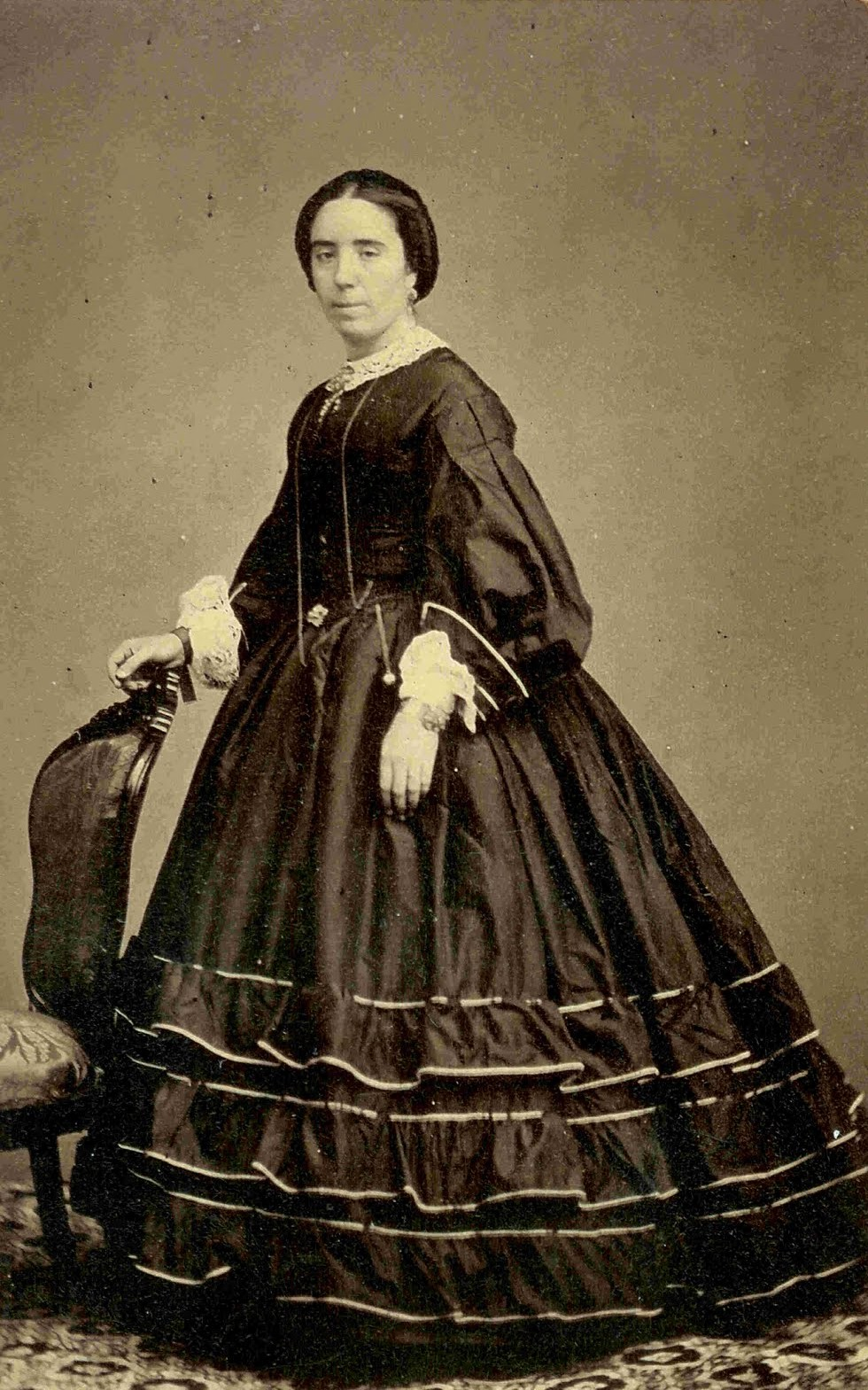
- Born: Elena Cipriana Álvarez; September 16, 1827; Seville, Spain
- Died: 1904 (aged 76–77)
- Occupations: Folklorist painter
- Spouse: Antonio Machado Nuñez (m. 1844)
- Children: Antonio "Demofilo" Machado y Alvarez, Ana Ruiz Hernandez
- Relatives: Agustín Durán
- Writing career
- Language: Spanish
- Genre: Folklore
- Notable works: La mano negra, regenerationist literature

Cipriana Álvarez Durán (1827–1904) was a Spanish folklorist, writer and painter. She is noted for promoting popular culture and was known in Llerena (Badajoz) as La Mujer de los Cuentos (The Woman of Tales). She was the grandmother of the Spanish poet Antonio Machado.

== Biography ==
Durán was the daughter of Jose Alvarez Guerra, a former soldier and politician, and Cipriana Durán Yanez. For his republican political ideology, her father was exiled to France. He was noted for writing the four-volume Unidad Simbolica under the pseudonym, Un Amigo del Hombre.

Duran was married to Antonio Machado Nuñez in 1844. Durán was 15 years younger than her husband. She gave birth to a son, Antonio "Demofilo" Machado y Alvarez, in Santiago de Compostela. By 1847, her family moved to Seville.

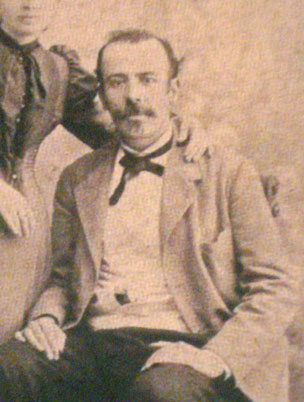
Duran's son, Demofilo

Generations of Durán's family had been interested in the local culture and folklore. This is said to be rooted in the family's nationalism based on "determinism-guided Romanticism". Particularly, her uncle, Agustín Durán, was a major influence in her interest in popular culture and ballads. Among her notable achievements began when she stayed for a long period with her relatives in Llerena, a city experiencing a decline. It is claimed that folklore played an important part in its revival and Durán played a crucial role in this development. Durán along with members of the intellectual elite such as Hernandez de Soto, began collecting popular culture from Llerena's inhabitants. Farmers, laborers, gardeners, and even children served as her sources for works that eventually became part of regenerationist initiatives that encouraged progress, education, literature, arts, and knowledge of local history.

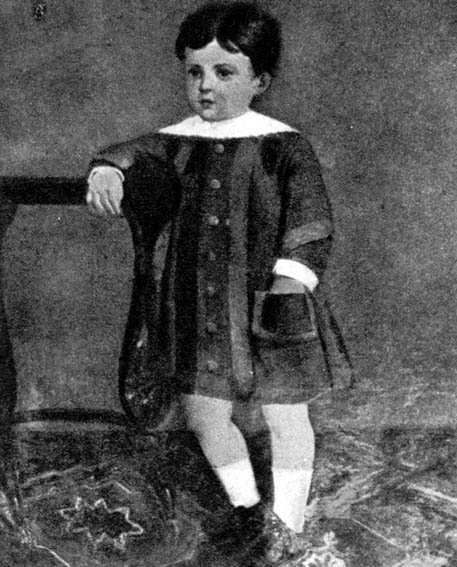
A picture of the infant, Antonio Machado.

In her later life, Durán painted and supported the works of her son Demofilo, who became noted for his folkloric studies that covered the 1860s to the 1890s. These studies linked folklore to questions of national identity and philosophy.

A street in Llerena is named in honor of Durán.

== Works ==
Durán's works on popular tales were published in magazines such as El Folk-lore Andaluz. She also contributed stories to her son's book such as "El barquito de oro, de plata y de seda" and "La sirena". Her grandson also published a number of her unpublished works after her death.

Durán also influenced her grandson Antonio Machado early in his life. She was said to have habitually read Durán's Romancero and Becquer's Leyendas not only to the young Antonio but to his brother Manuel, who also became a noted writer and poet.

=== Publications ===
- La mano negra
- Una rueda de conejos
- La serpiente de las siete cabezas
- Las velas
- Las tres Marías.
