= Juan de Mairena =

1936 book by Antonio Machado

Juan de Mairena (sentencias, donaires, apuntes y recuerdos de un profesor apócrifo)
- Author: Antonio Machado
- Language: Spanish
- Genre: Prose
- Publisher: Espasa Calpe
- Publication date: 1936
- Publication place: Spain
- Preceded by: Poesías completas (1899–1930)
- Followed by: La guerra (1936–1937)

Juan de Mairena (sentencias, donaires, apuntes y recuerdos de un profesor apócrifo) is a book written in prose by the Spanish author Antonio Machado in 1936 and published by Espasa-Calpe.

== Plot ==
An imaginary teacher and his students analyse the society, the culture, the art, the literature, the politics and the philosophy by the paradox, the adage, the erudition, the introspection, the rhetoric and the spoonerism.

== Analysis ==
The appearance of Juan de Mairena is like Antonio Machado at his 33 years in 1898. The book was originally signed as a heteronym work.

Based on the discovery of some poems to Guiomar supposedly prior to the date when Machado and Pilar met, conclude that Guiomar is but another of Machado's apocryphal imaginaries, such as Abel Martín or Juan de Mairena.
