= Pilar Calvo Rodero =

Spanish designer (1910–1974)

Calvo Rodero in undated photo.

Pilar Calvo Rodero (Madrid, 1910–1974) was a Spanish sculptor, costume designer, and set designer.

== Early life and education ==
Her mother was Anunciación Rodero Domínguez, and her father was Gaspar Castor Calvo Rodero, deputy director of the Tabacalera in Madrid. The couple had six daughters and one son: Josefa, Carmen, Matilde, Rosalía, Isabel, Pilar, and Rafael. Her sister Matilde was an engraver and bookbinder who worked at the Museo Nacional de Artes Decorativas.

Calvo studied at the French Girls' Lycée and the IES San Isidro. She began her studies as a draftsman and surveyor but did not complete them. She worked as a teacher at the Escuela Normal de Madrid, where she taught drawing and manual arts. At the same time, she contributed articles to fashion and decoration columns. In 1924, she participated in the National Fine Arts Exhibition with a photoengraved casket in the Decorative Arts section.

== Career ==
In 1932, she married the critic, writer, and theater director Alfredo Marqueríe.

During the civil war, they moved to Tangier with their daughter, where Calvo began modeling. Upon returning to Madrid, she took classes from the sculptor José Planes. Once the war was over, Calvo exhibited for several years at the Salon d'Automne, organized by the Asociación Española de Pintores y Escultores (Spanish Association of Painters and Sculptors):

- 1945, Cabeza de muchacho (in wood) and Cabeza en escayola (in plaster)
- 1949, Desnudo en escayola (in plaster)
- 1950, Niños (in plaster)
- 1952, two works in plaster, Mujer sentada and Desnudo

When the Museo de Arte Contemporáneo organized a tribute to Daniel Vázquez Díaz, Calvo participated alongside other artists such as Eva Aggerholm, Menchu Gal, Aurora Lezcano, Salvador Dalí, Ángel Ferrant, Ricardo Baroja, Benjamín Palencia, and Darío de Regoyos.

Calvo held her first solo exhibition in 1951 at the Instituto Internacional de Madrid. She exhibited seventeen sculptures in stone, wood, fired clay, and patinated plaster, some with bullfighting themes. Thanks to a grant from the French Ministry for Europe and Foreign Affairs, she lived in Paris between March and April 1952. There, she successfully exhibited her series dedicated to moments in bullfighting: Chicuelina, Citando de frente, Paseo natural, Verónica, De frente por detrás, and Paso de rodillas. In 1952, she participated in a collective exhibition on bullfighting themes held at the Galería Xagra in Madrid, promoted by Antonio Oliver, where he was the only sculptor. She also exhibited in Tangier and at the Sala Estilo. She exhibited Desnudo at the 1954 National Fine Arts Exhibition. That same year, she was awarded a third place medal at the National Fine Arts Exhibition for her work Desnudo de mujer. In 1957, Calvo received the runner-up prize in the National Sculpture Award for her work Retrato de Azorín. In 1964, she participated in XXV Years of Spanish Art at the Palacio de Velázquez's Retiro Exhibition Hall in Madrid.

She also worked in fashion design, costume design, and set design, and contributed to various publications. She began her activity as a contributor in the Madrid newspape España in 1938 and 1939 in a section entitled "La mujer y el hogar" (Women and the Home), where, in addition to writing fashion columns, she gave decorating tips, recipes, and more. The illustrations were her own. She created sets and designed costumes for numerous plays, as well as serving as the executive secretary of the Teatro Popular Español.

== Death and legacy ==
Calvo and her husband died in a traffic accident near Minglanilla on July 31, 1974. They were buried in the Cementerio de San Justo.

Her work was included in the exhibition Reexistencias, escultoras del siglo XX (Re-existences, 20th-century sculptors), held in Madrid and Seville in 2006.

== See also ==
- Avant-garde
