= IES Andrés Laguna =

Coordinates: 40°56′19″N 4°06′58″W

I.E.S. Andrés Laguna, Segovia
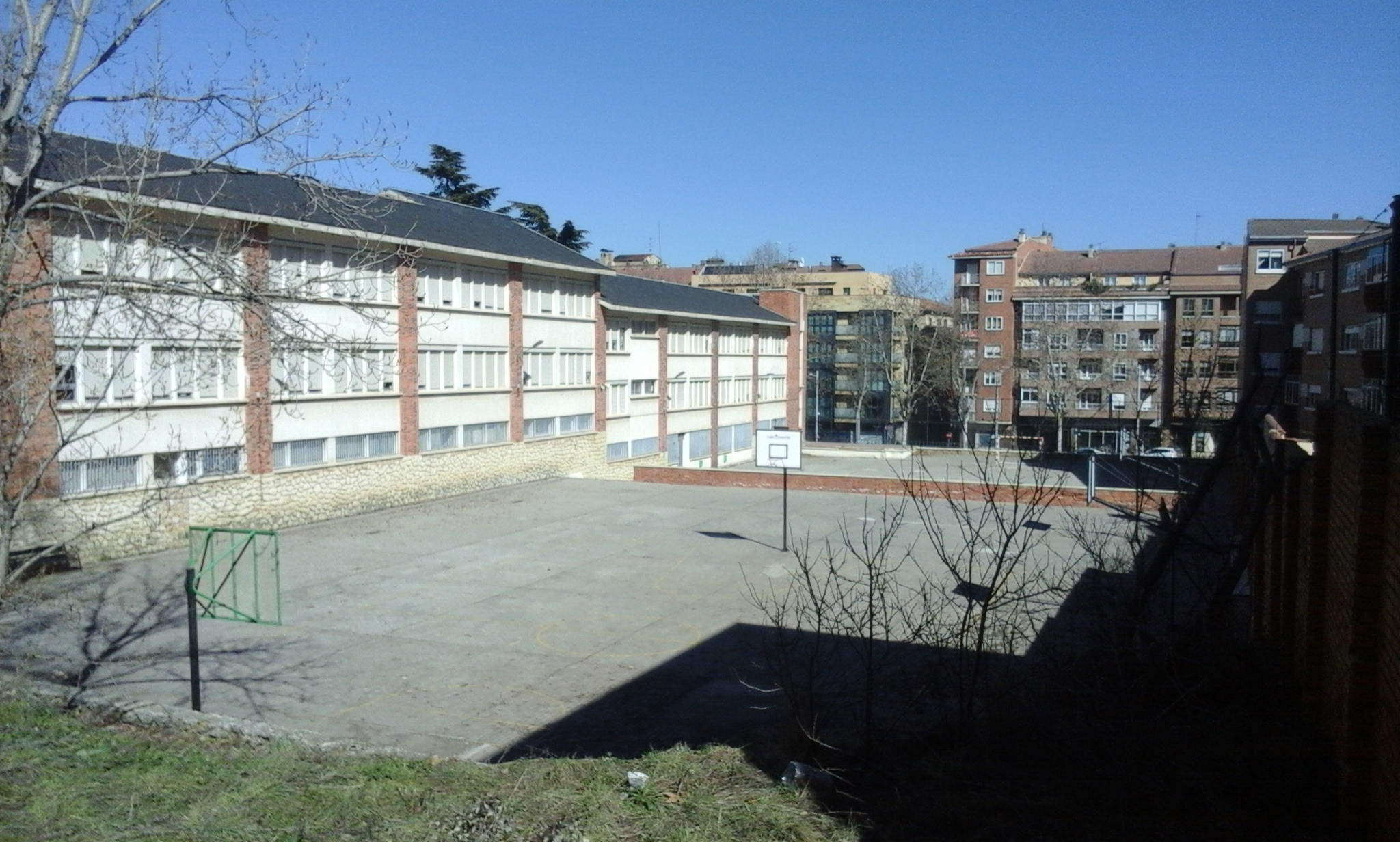
- Segovia, Spain

Information
- Type: Public, Secondary
- Established: 1841
- School district: Segovia
- Faculty: 113
- Enrollment: 1100
- Website: Andrés Laguna

The IES (Institute of Secondary Education) Andrés Laguna is a public educational center located in the city of Segovia, Castilla y León, Spain.

It originates from the Provincial Institute of Segovia, the oldest educational center in the province, founded for the first time in 1841, thus having been open for more than 180 years, and the educational center has a staff of 113 teachers and more than 1,100 registered students.

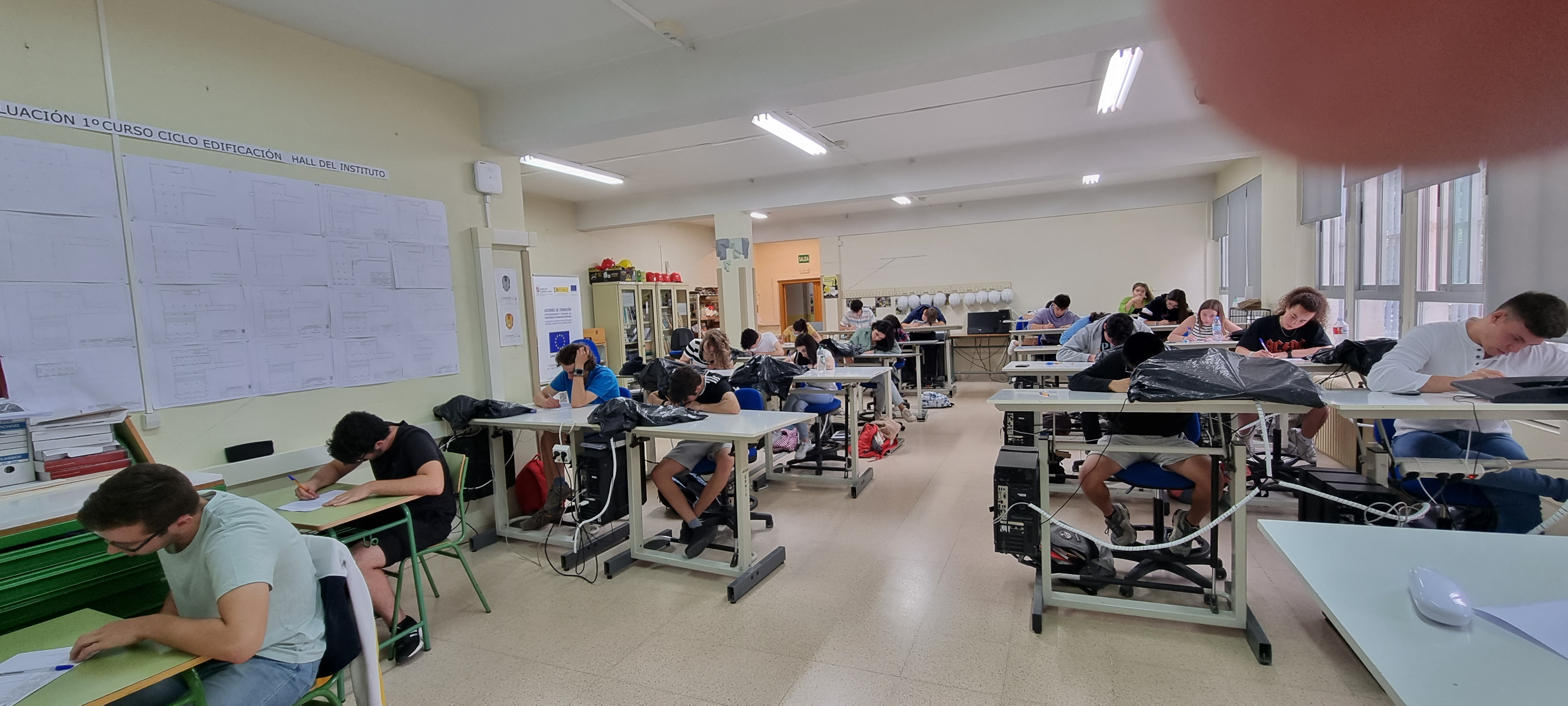
1st grade students of Baccalaureate BIE doing an exam in the Building Vocational Training classroom in 2022

The school has a collection of fossils.

== Notable teachers ==
- Antonio Machado, French teacher, vice-principal in 1927;
- Vicente Gaos González-Pola (1964);
- Consuelo Burell (1964);
- Carlos Sahagún (sección delegada en 1965).
