= Carrocera =

- Flag Coat of arms

- Location within Spain
- Coordinates: 42°47′45″N 5°44′35″W
- Country: Spain
- Autonomous community: Castile and León
- Province: León
- Municipality: Carrocera

Government
  - Mayor: Trinitario Viñayo Muñiz (PSOE)

Area
  - Total: 65.98 km^{2} (25.48 sq mi)
- Elevation: 1,055 m (3,461 ft)

Population (2025-01-01)
  - Total: 437
  - Density: 6.62/km^{2} (17.2/sq mi)
- Time zone: UTC+1 (CET)
  - Summer (DST): UTC+2 (CEST)
- Postal Code: 24123
- Telephone prefix: 987

Carrocera (Spanish pronunciation: [karoˈθeɾa]) is a municipality in the province of León, Castile and León, Spain. According to the 2010 census (INE), the municipality has a population of 555 inhabitants.
