= I.E.S. Mariano Quintanilla =

I.E.S. Mariano Quintanilla, Segovia
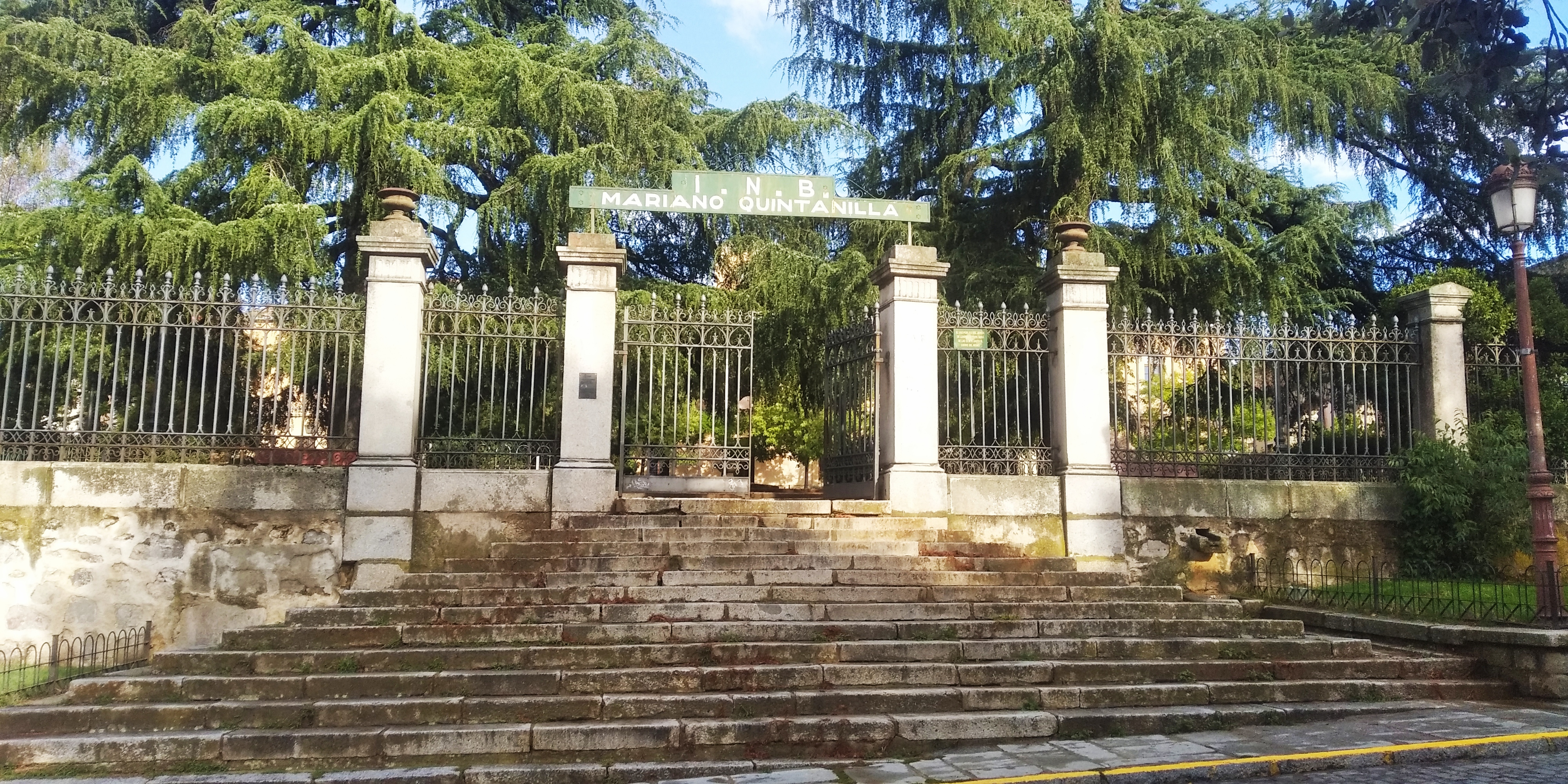
- High School entrance

Location
- Segovia, Spain
- Coordinates: 40°56′48″N 4°06′56″W

Information
- Type: Public, Secondary
- Established: 1969
- Sister school: IES Andrés Laguna
- School district: Segovia
- Enrollment: 700
- Colors: Green and Gold

The High School I.E.S. Mariano Quintanilla, Segovia is a state High School in Segovia, Spain, Europe. The building was the Provincial Institute of Segovia, one of the oldest in the country, which is today the IES Andrés Laguna. After the inauguration of the new building in 1963, this was the women's section until 1969 when it was established as a new independent center.

The main building is one of the best examples of Modernist architecture in Spain, regarded as Bien de Interés Cultural (Piece of cultural interest). Its architects were Joaquín Odriozola and Antonio Bermejo.

== Language exchanges ==
The I.E.S. Mariano Quintanilla has been doing international scholar exchanges since the early 1990s. For example, a school with which they frequently hold exchanges is Marysville High School (Ohio), in Marysville, Ohio. There have also been several exchanges with foreign French-speaking schools, such as in Tours, (France).

== Websites ==
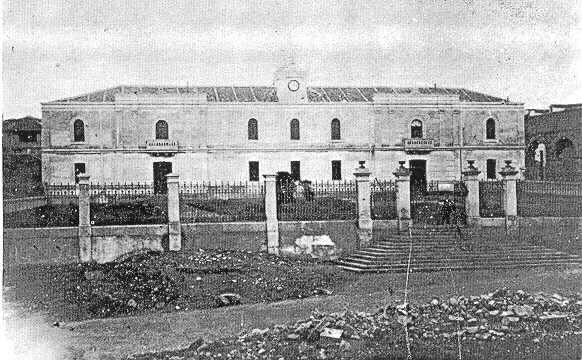
State of the old building during the late 19th Century.

- Mariano Quintanilla
