= Manuel Machado (poet) =

Spanish poet

The Most Excellent Manuel Machado
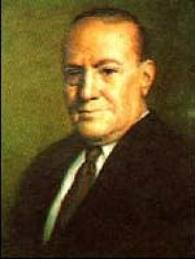
- Born: Manuel Machado y Ruiz; 29 August 1874; Seville, Spain
- Died: 19 January 1947 (aged 72); Madrid, Spain

Seat N of the Real Academia Española
- In office 19 February 1938 – 19 January 1947
- Preceded by: Leonardo Torres Quevedo
- Succeeded by: Francisco Javier Sánchez Cantón

Manuel Machado y Ruiz (29 August 1874 – 19 January 1947) was a Spanish poet and a prominent member of the Generation of '98.

== Biography ==
Manuel Machado was the son of Antonio Machado Álvarez, a known folklorist Seville nicknamed "Demófilo", and Ana Ruiz. His brothers were also poets: Antonio Machado and José Machado. He inherited his father's love of the popular Andalusian character. Manuel was born in San Pedro Martir Street No. 20, spending his childhood in the Palacio de las Dueñas, where his family had rented one of the zones reserved for individuals. His whole family moved to Madrid when Manuel was 9, because his paternal grandfather had obtained a professorship at the Universidad Central. The desire of all the three brothers was to study in the Free Institution of Teaching, led by Francisco Giner de los Ríos, who was a great friend of Manuel's grandfather.

Later, the family moved to Madrid, where Manuel progressed in his studies, culminating with a Bachelor of Arts. After that, his family returned to Seville on only a few occasions, but Seville and Andalusia were in his mind as a living reference, however distant, for the love of his parents towards their land.

In Madrid, Manuel began to publish his first poetry and contributed to several literary publications in Madrid along with writers like Francisco Villaespesa and Juan Ramón Jiménez.

He was co-founder of the Association of Friends of the Soviet Union on February 11, 1933.

Over the years, he became director of Madrid's Municipal Library (now the Municipal Historical Library) and the Municipal Museum. He created several short-lived literary magazines and worked in daily newspapers in Europe and America.

Machado contributed strongly to the modernist poetry, and understood its colorful, decadent and cosmopolitan themes, and that giving a hint of Andalusian poetry makes something unique. This has often been opposed to the modernist side of the Generation of '98.

In 1938, during the Spanish Civil War, Manuel was appointed to a seat in the Royal Spanish Academy.

In collaboration with his brother Antonio, Manuel wrote several dramatic works in the Andalusian style. Manuel's most notable dramatic work is La Lola se va a los puertos, adapted into film twice (1947 and 1993).

Other dramatic works by Machado were the La duquesa de Benamejí, La prima Fernanda, Juan de Mañara, El hombre que murió en la guerra and Desdichas de la fortuna o Julianillo Valcárcel.

Although the poetry of the two brothers is very different, we can see certain parallels. Thus, both composed autobiographical poems ("Adelfos" Manuel, and "Portrait", by Antonio) using Alexandrine verses organized in serventesios. The civil war separated the brothers, placing them on opposite sides.

Upon arrival in Madrid after the Spanish coup of July 1936, Manuel gave the military an encomiastic poetry, "The sword of the Caudillo." This earned him the recognition of the Nationalists. After the war he returned to his post as director of the Newspaper Library and the Municipal Museum of Madrid, and retired shortly thereafter. He continued to write poetry, mostly religious in nature. His Catholic faith was rekindled during a stay in Burgos and thanks to the devotion of his wife and the influence of certain priests, such as Bonifacio Zamora. He continued to write eulogies to various figures and symbols of Francoist Spain, which earned him the scorn of critics and later poets, who considered him a traitor to the Spanish Second Republic.

On January 19, 1947 he died in Madrid. After the poet's death, his widow entered a religious order dedicated to caring for abandoned and sick children.

When the Spanish openness came of the 60s and 70s, Francisco Franco gave the youth side to the poets covered by Spain and embraced those who died, or who still lived in exile. Thus, the work and figure of Manuel Machado were eclipsed by those of Antonio Machado, more akin to the taste of the time.

Some famous poems by Manuel Machado include:

CANTARES

Original Spanish	English translation
Vino, sentimiento, guitarra y poesía hacen los cantares de la patria mía. Quien dice cantares dice Andalucía. A la sombra fresca de la vieja parra, un mozo moreno rasguea la guitarra... Cantares... Algo que acaricia y algo que desgarra. La prima que canta y el bordón que llora... Y el tiempo callado se va hora tras hora. Cantares... Son dejos fatales de la raza mora. No importa la vida, que ya está perdida, y, después de todo, ¿qué es eso, la vida?... Cantares... Cantando la pena, la pena se olvida. Madre, pena, suerte, pena, madre, muerte, ojos negros, negros, y negra la suerte... Cantares... En ellos el alma del alma se vierte. Cantares. Cantares de la patria mía, quien dice cantares dice Andalucía. Cantares... No tiene más notas la guitarra mía.	Wine, feeling, guitar, and poetry make the songs of my homeland. Whoever says songs says Andalusia. In the cool shade of the old grapevine, a dark youth strums the guitar... Songs... Something that caresses and something that tears. The high string that sings and the low string that weeps... And silent time goes by hour after hour. Songs... They are fatal traces of the Moorish race. Life does not matter, for it is already lost, and, after all, what is that, life?... Songs... Singing the sorrow, the sorrow is forgotten. Mother, sorrow, luck, sorrow, mother, death, black, black eyes, and black is the luck... Songs... In them the soul of the soul is poured out. Songs. Songs of my homeland, whoever says songs says Andalusia. Songs... My guitar has no more notes.

CASTILLA

Original Spanish	English translation
El ciego sol se estrella en las duras aristas de las armas, llaga de luz los petos y espaldares y flamea en las puntas de las lanzas. El ciego sol, la sed y la fatiga. Por la terrible estepa castellana, al destierro, con doce de los suyos —polvo, sudor y hierro—, el Cid cabalga. Cerrado está el mesón a piedra y lodo. Nadie responde. Al pomo de la espada y al cuento de las picas el postigo va a ceder... ¡Quema el sol, el aire abrasa! A los terribles golpes, de eco ronco, una voz pura, de plata y de cristal responde... Hay una niña muy débil y muy blanca en el umbral. Es toda ojos azules y en los ojos lágrimas. Oro pálido nimba su carita curiosa y asustada. «¡Buen Cid, pasad...! El rey nos dará muerte, arruinará la casa, y sembrará de sal el pobre campo que mi padre trabaja... Idos. El cielo os colme de venturas... ¡En nuestro mal, oh Cid no ganáis nada!» Calla la niña y llora sin gemido... Un sollozo infantil cruza la escuadra de feroces guerreros, y una voz inflexible grita «¡En marcha!» El ciego sol, la sed y la fatiga. Por la terrible estepa castellana, al destierro, con doce de los suyos —polvo, sudor y hierro—, el Cid cabalga.	The blind sun crashes on the harsh edges of the weapons, wounds with light the breastplates and backplates and flutters on the tips of the spears. The blind sun, thirst, and fatigue. Across the terrible Castilian steppe, into exile, with twelve of his men —dust, sweat, and iron—, the Cid rides. The inn is closed with stone and mud. No one answers. Against the pommel of the sword and the shafts of the pikes, the wicket gate is about to yield... The sun burns, the air scorches! To the terrible blows, with a hoarse echo, a pure voice, of silver and crystal responds... There is a little girl very weak and very white on the threshold. She is all blue eyes and in her eyes tears. Pale gold haloes her curious and frightened little face. "Good Cid, pass...! The king will put us to death, will ruin the house, and will sow salt on the poor field that my father works... Go. May heaven fill you with fortunes... In our misfortune, oh Cid, you gain nothing!" The girl falls silent and weeps without a groan... An infantile sob crosses the squadron of ferocious warriors, and an inflexible voice shouts "March!" The blind sun, thirst, and fatigue. Across the terrible Castilian steppe, into exile, with twelve of his men —dust, sweat, and iron—, the Cid rides.

LA COPLA

Original Spanish	English translation
Hasta que el pueblo las canta, las coplas, coplas no son, y cuando las canta el pueblo, ya nadie sabe el autor. Procura tú que tus coplas vayan al pueblo a parar, aunque dejen de ser tuyas para ser de los demás. Que, al fundir el corazón en el alma popular, lo que se pierde de nombre se gana de eternidad.	Until the people sing them, the songs, songs are not, and when the people sing them, then nobody knows the author. Try that your songs end up with the people, even if they stop being yours to belong to others. That, by melting the heart in the people soul, what is lost in name one gains in eternity.

== Sources ==
- Curiosities about Manuel Machado and his family
