= Antonio Machado =

Spanish poet (1875–1939)

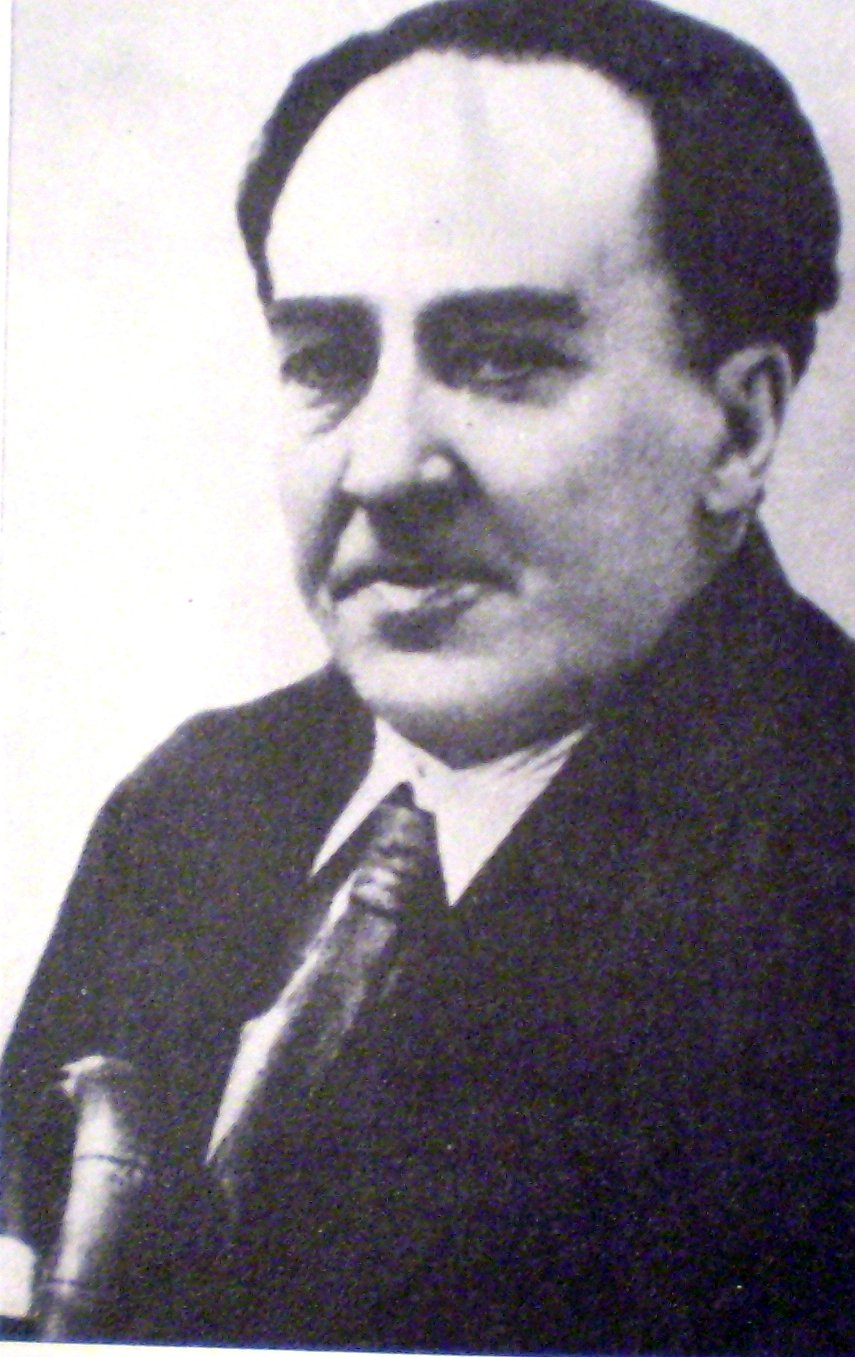
- Born: Antonio Cipriano José María y Francisco de Santa Ana Machado y Ruiz; 26 July 1875; Seville, Andalusia, Spain
- Died: 22 February 1939 (aged 63); Collioure, Pyrénées-Orientales, France
- Occupations: Poet; professor of French
- Spouse: Leonor Izquierdo (m. 1909; died 1912)
- Writing career
- Language: Spanish
- Genre: Poetry
- Notable works: Soledades; Campos de Castilla

Antonio Cipriano José María y Francisco de Santa Ana Machado y Ruiz (26 July 1875 – 22 February 1939), simply known as Antonio Machado, was a Spanish poet and one of the leading figures of the Spanish literary movement known as the Generation of '98. His work, initially following modernismo, evolved towards an intimate form of symbolism with romantic traits. He gradually developed a style characterised by both an engagement with humanity on one side and an almost Taoist contemplation of existence on the other, a synthesis that, according to Machado, echoed the most ancient popular wisdom. In Gerardo Diego's words, Machado "spoke in verse and lived in poetry."

== Biography ==
Machado was born in Seville, Spain, one year after his brother Manuel. He was a grandson to the noted Spanish folklorist, Cipriana Álvarez Durán. The family moved to Madrid in 1883 and both brothers enrolled in the Institución Libre de Enseñanza. During these years—with the encouragement of his teachers—Antonio discovered his passion for literature. While completing his Bachillerato in Madrid, economic difficulties forced him to take several jobs, including working as an actor. In 1899, he and his brother traveled to Paris to work as translators for a French publisher. During these months in Paris, he came into contact with the great French Symbolist poets Jean Moréas, Paul Fort and Paul Verlaine, and also with other contemporary literary figures, including Rubén Darío and Oscar Wilde. These encounters cemented Machado's decision to dedicate himself to poetry.

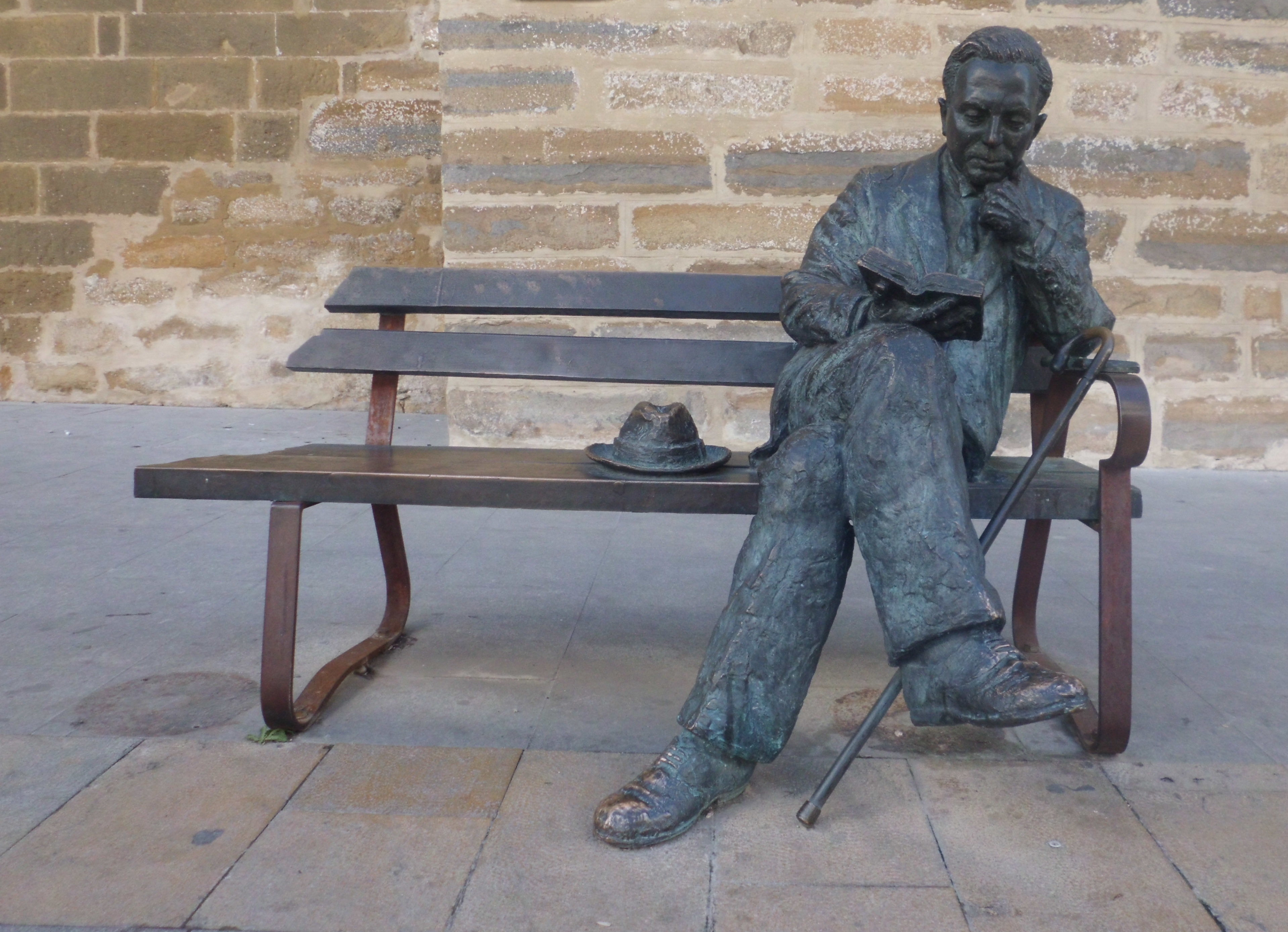
Statue of Antonio Machado on Calle San Pablo in Baeza, Jaén, Spain

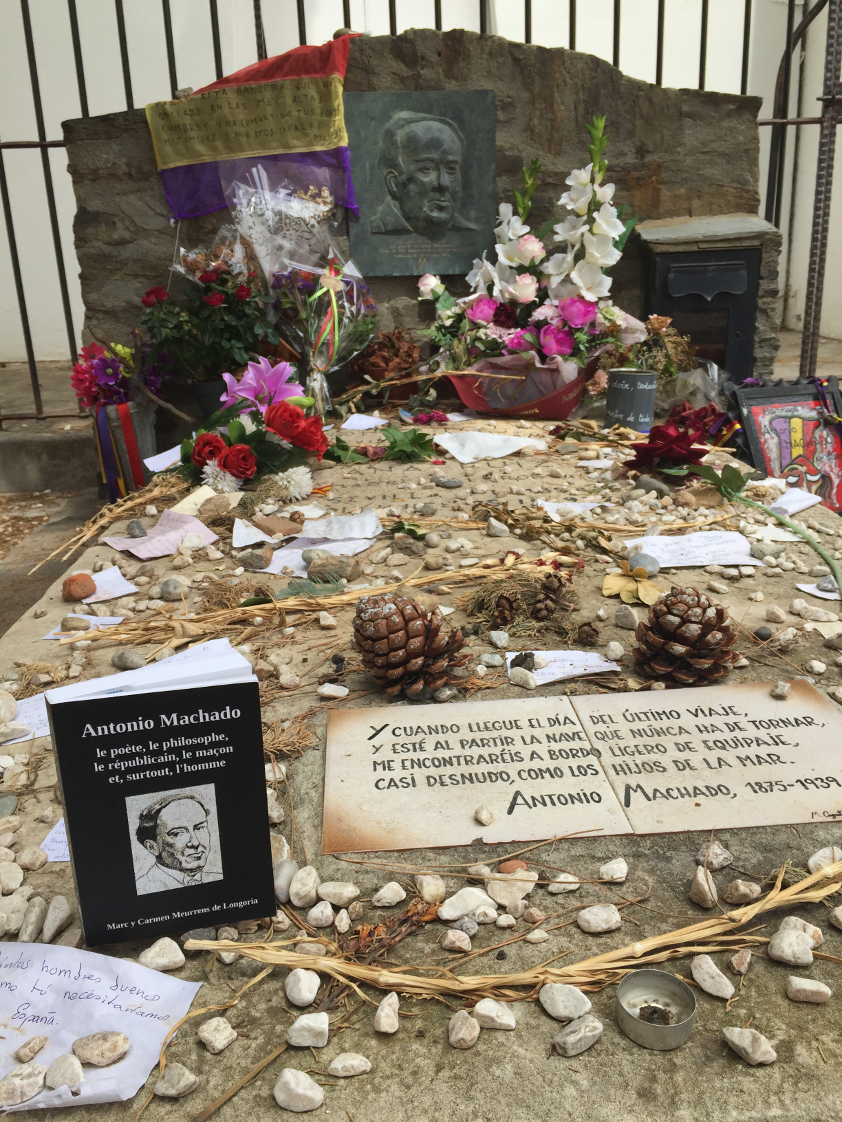
Machado's grave at Collioure cemetery

In 1901, he had his first poems published in the literary journal 'Electra'. His first book of poetry was published in 1903, titled Soledades. Over the next few years, he gradually amended the collection, removing some and adding many more. In 1907, the definitive collection was published with the title Soledades and Galerías. Otros Poemas. In the same year, Machado was offered the job of Professor of French at the school in Soria. Here, he met Leonor Izquierdo, daughter of the owners of the boarding house Machado was staying in. They were married in 1909, he was 34 and Leonor was 15. Early in 1911, the couple went to live in Paris where Machado read more French literature and studied philosophy. In the summer however, Leonor was diagnosed with advanced tuberculosis and they returned to Spain. On 1 August 1912, Leonor died, just a few weeks after the publication of Campos de Castilla. Machado was devastated and left Soria, the city that had inspired the poetry of Campos, never to return.

He went to live in Baeza, Andalusia, where he stayed until 1919. Here, he wrote a series of poems dealing with the death of Leonor which were added to a new (and now definitive) edition of Campos de Castilla published in 1916 along with the first edition of Nuevas canciones. While his earlier poems are in an ornate, Modernist style, with the publication of "Campos de Castilla" he showed an evolution toward greater simplicity, a characteristic that was to distinguish his poetry from then on.

Between 1919 and 1931, Machado was Professor of French at the Instituto de Segovia, in Segovia. He moved there to be nearer to Madrid, where Manuel lived. The brothers would meet at weekends to work together on a number of plays, the performances of which earned them great popularity. It was here also that Antonio had a secret affair with Pilar de Valderrama, a married woman with three children, to whom he would refer in his work by the name Guiomar. In 1932, he was given the post of professor at the "Instituto Calderón de la Barca" in Madrid. He collaborated with Rafael Alberti and published articles in his magazine, Octubre, in 1933–1934.

When the Spanish Civil War broke out in July 1936, Machado was in Madrid. The war permanently separated him from his brother Manuel who was trapped in the Nationalist (Francoist) zone, and from Valderrama who was in Portugal. Machado was evacuated with his elderly mother and uncle to Valencia, and then to Barcelona in 1938. Finally, as Franco closed in on the last Republican strongholds, they were obliged to move across the French border to Collioure. It was here, on 22 February 1939, that Antonio Machado died, just three days before his mother. In his pocket was found his last poem, Estos días azules y este sol de infancia. Machado is buried in Collioure where he died; Leonor is buried in Soria.

On his way to Collioure in December 1938, he wrote "For the strategists, for the politicians, for the historians, all this will be clear: we lost the war. But at a human level I am not so sure: perhaps we won."

He turned away from the hermetic esthetic principles of post-symbolism and cultivated the dynamic openness of social realism. Like such French æsthetes as Verlaine, Machado began with a fin de siècle contemplation of his sensory world, portraying it through memory and the impressions of his private consciousness. And like his socially conscious colleagues of the Generation of 1898, he emerged from his solitude to contemplate Spain's historical landscape with a sympathetic yet unindulgent eye. His poetic work begins with the publication of Soledades in 1903. In this short volume, many personal links which will characterize his later work are noticeable. In Soledades, Galerías. Otros poemas, published in 1907, his voice becomes his own and influences 20th Century poets Octavio Paz, Derek Walcott, and Giannina Braschi who writes about Machado's impact in her Spanglish classic Yo-Yo Boing!. The most typical feature of his personality is the antipathetic, softly sorrowful tone that can be felt even when he describes real things or common themes of the time, for example abandoned gardens, old parks or fountains: places which he approaches via memory or dreams.

After Machado's experience with the introspective poetry of his first period, he withdrew from the spectacle of his conflictive personality and undertook to witness the general battle of the "two Spains", each one struggling to gain the ascendancy. In 1912, he published "Campos de Castilla", a collection of poems lyricising the beauty of the Castilian countryside. Just as the poet's own personality revealed mutually destructive elements in the earlier Galerías and Soledades, so too did the Cain–Abel Bible story, interpreted in "La Tierra de Alvargonzález", later attest to the factions in Spain that shredded one another and the national fabric in an effort to restore unity. At the same time, other poems projected Castilian archetypes that evoked emotions like pathos ("La mujer manchega", "The Manchegan Woman"), revulsion ("Un criminal"), and stark rapture ("Campos de Soria"). The book also included a series of short reflective poems, often resembling popular songs or sayings, called "Proverbios y Cantares" (Proverbs and Songs).

Caminante, son tus huellas
el camino y nada más;
caminante, no hay camino,
se hace camino al andar.
Al andar se hace camino,
y al volver la vista atrás
se ve la senda que nunca
se ha de volver a pisar.
Caminante, no hay camino,
sino estelas en la mar.

Wayfarer, only your footprints
are the path, and nothing more;
wayfarer, there is no path,
you make the path as you walk.
As you walk you make the path,
and as you turn to glance behind
you see the trail that you never
shall return to tread again.
Wayfarer, there is no path,
only wake trails on the sea.

— from "Proverbios y cantares" in Campos de Castilla, 1917 edition

In 1917, various poems were added to "Campos", including a group of poems written in Baeza about the death of his young wife, new "Proverbios y Cantares", and a series of "Elogios", dedicated to people such as Rubén Darío and Juan Ramón Jiménez who had been influential in his life.

Machado's later poems serve as a virtual anthropology of Spain's common people, depicting their collective psychology, social mores, and historical destiny. He creates this panorama through fundamental myths and recurring, timeless patterns of group behavior. These archetypes are developed in his work "Campos de Castilla" ("Castilian Fields"), particularly in key poems such as "La tierra de Alvargonzález" and "Por tierras de España," which draw on Biblical inheritance stories. The metaphors from this period employ geographical and topographical references to convey strong judgments about the socio-economic and moral conditions on the Peninsula.

His next book, "Nuevas canciones" (New Songs), published in 1924, marks the final period of his work. This late oeuvre is characterized by, as Andreas Dorschel puts it, "an immense multiplicity of voices". Machado's complete poetry, Poesías Completas, was published in 1938 and contains Poesias de Guerra (Poems of War), with El crimen fue en Granada (The crime took place in Granada), an elegy to Federico García Lorca.

Poet Geoffrey Hill has hailed him as Montale's 'grand equal'. His phrase "the two Spains"—one that dies and one that yawns—referring to the left-right political divisions that led to the Civil War, has passed into Spanish and other languages.

== Major publications ==
- Soledades (1903)
- Soledades. Galerías. Otros poemas (1907)
- Campos de Castilla (1912). See Campos de Castilla [Fields of Castile], translated by Stanley Appelbaum, Dover Publications, 2007, ISBN 978-0486461779.
- Poesías completas (1917)
- Nuevas canciones (1924)
- Poesías completas (1936, cuarta edición)
- Juan de Mairena (1936)

== Translations into English (selected poems) ==
- Times Alone: Selected Poems of Antonio Machado. Translated by Robert Bly. Wesleyan. 1982. ISBN 978-0819560810. Dual language edition.
- Border of a Dream: Selected Poems of Antonio Machado. Translated by Willis Barnstone. Copper Canyon Press. 2003. ISBN 978-1556591983. Dual language edition.
- The Dream Below the Sun: Selected Poems of Antonio Machado. Willis Barnstone (translation), John Dos Passos (introduction). Crossing Press. 1981. ISBN 978-0895940476. Dual language edition.
- Antonio Machado: Selected Poems. Alan S. Trueblood (translation). Harvard University Press. 1988. ISBN 978-0674040663. OCLC 490064076.
- Antonio Machado: Solitudes & Other Early Poems. Michael Smith & Luis Ingelmo (translation). Shearsman Books. 2015. ISBN 978-1848613911. OCLC 899975241.
