= Baroja =

Baroja is a surname. Notable people with the surname include:

- Alain Baroja (born 1989), Venezuelan footballer
- Carmen Baroja (1883–1950), Spanish writer and ethnologist
- José Baroja (1983-), Chilean writer
- Julio Caro Baroja (1914–1995), Spanish anthropologist, historian, linguist and essayist
- Pío Baroja (1872–1956), Spanish writer
- Pío Caro Baroja (1928–2015), Spanish film and television director, screenwriter, and author
- Ricardo Baroja (1871–1953), Spanish painter, writer and engraver
- Serafin Baroja (1840–1912), Spanish writer and engineer
