= Ricardo Baroja =

Spanish painter (1871–1953)

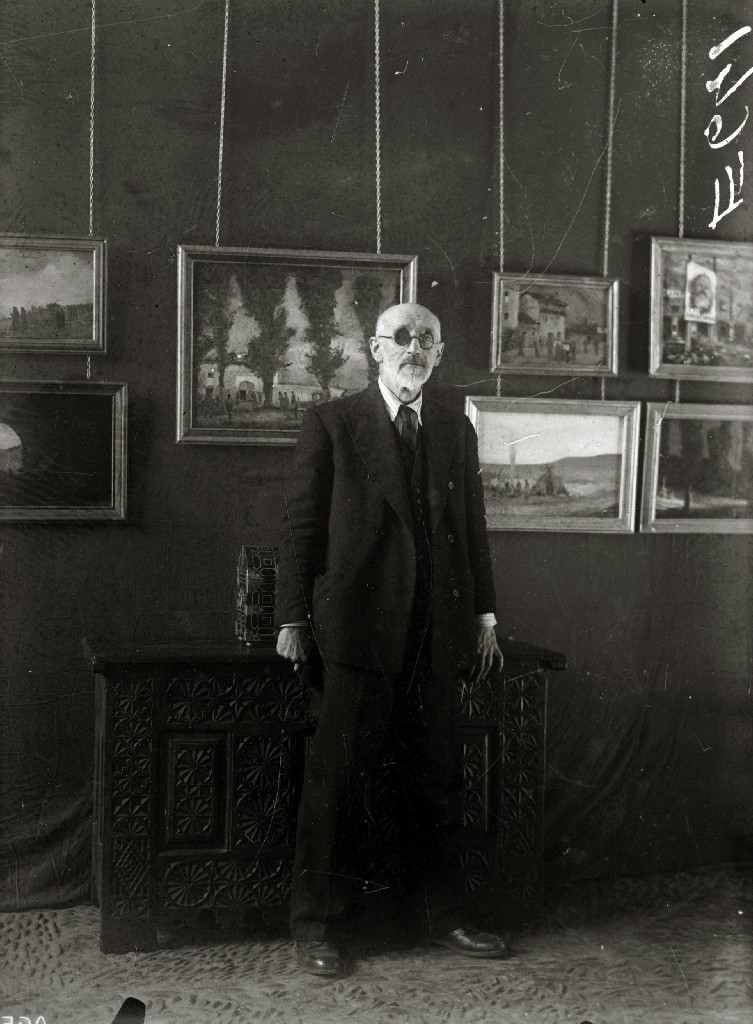
Ricardo Baroja in San Sebastián in 1938.

Ricardo Baroja y Nessi (12 January 1871 – 19 December 1953) was a Spanish painter, writer and engraver. As an engraver, he is considered the successor of Francisco Goya. He was the brother of the novelist Pío Baroja and writer/ethnologist Carmen Baroja. Carmen was the mother of anthropologist Julio Caro Baroja and director/screenwriter Pío Caro Baroja.

== Early life ==
Ricardo's father, Serafin Baroja, was a mining engineer and the itinerant nature of his profession caused Ricardo to be born in Minas de Río Tinto, in the Province of Huelva (Spain), an ancient mining village since the time of the Phoenicians in Andalusía. Soon after his birth the Río Tinto Mines were sold to a consortium from the United Kingdom and Australia, the Rio Tinto Group, and so the family returned to San Sebastián.

In 1879, when Ricardo was eight, the family moved to Madrid, but two years later, they were living on the banks of the Río Arga in Pamplona, and they were in Bilbao in 1886. At fifteen, Ricardo attended the Polytechnic School of Engineering in Madrid in an attempt to follow in his father's career as a mining engineer. While there, he had an attack of tuberculosis, a disease from which his elder brother, Dario (1869–1894), was suffering.

Alarmed, his parents withdrew him from the school so he could recover. Later, following his love for art he studied museology at the Cuerpo de Archivos y Bibliotecas (1888–1891) so that he could work in museums. He also attended a painting academy studying with Eugene Vivó. In 1890 he travelled to the art circles of Málaga and València and was inspired by the older painters Francisco Domingo Marqués and Ignacio Pinazo Camarlench. At Valencia, he met the painter Julio Peris Brell with whom he struck up a lifelong friendship. In 1894, he went to Madrid to help his maternal aunt, Juana Nessi, run her bakery after the death of her husband, Mattias Lacasa.

His younger brother, Pío, arrived to help out by making the Viennese bread and tea at her bakery, Viena Capellanes. However, the brothers were more interested in their artistic endeavors. Ricardo was painting as well as illustrating the books his brother was now writing. During this time, in 1896, he read a science book about etching and engraving.

When his aunt died the brothers sold the bakery and Ricardo became a kind of Bohemian archivist working at the Archivo de Cáceres and, for short periods, at the library in Bilbao. In 1900, he worked for the tax office in Teruel and at the provincial library of Segovia, where he decided to end his career as a civil servant. He had always wanted to work in museums and had only achieved the bureaucratic tedium of filing and cataloging which went against his restless nature, and so he went on to pursue the bohemian life of the artist.

== Early 20th century ==
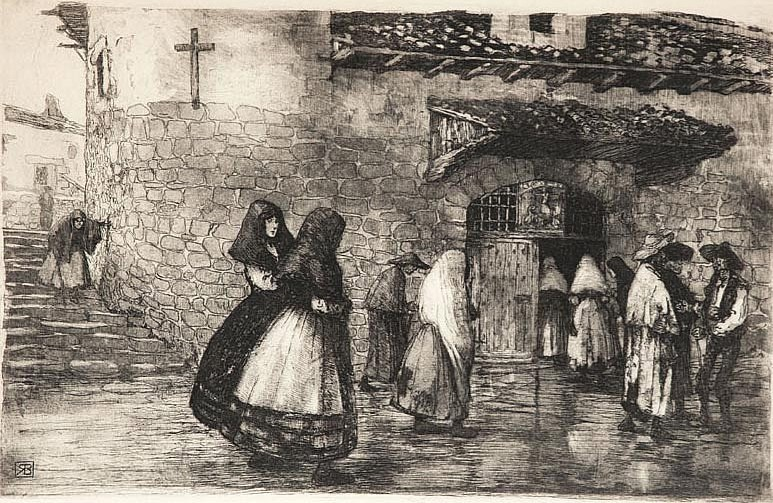
Entering a church (1908)

Ricardo belonged to the Generation of '98, a group of writers, philosophers, musicians and artists disillusioned with the reality that Spain was slowly losing its empire as well as its moral, political and spiritual compass. They met at various tertulias in Madrid to discuss its causes and attempt to seek out remedies for Spain's regeneration. He later published his Diario de Madrid that told about those times as Gente del 98 (1952; People of the Generation of '98). In those early days, art and literature did not provide enough to live on so upon hearing accounts of buried treasure, Ricardo set out armed and on horseback with his close friend Ramón del Valle-Inclán for the ancient mercury mines of Almadén in La Mancha in search of an undiscovered trove. This adventure ended when Valle-Inclán accidentally shot himself in the arm and foot.

On March 31, 1901, with Pablo Picasso and Francisco de Asís Soler, an editor, he started a magazine, Arte Joven (Young Art), publishing five issues using the pseudonym "Juan Gualberto Nessi", which was actually his birth name. In 1903, he and his brother were war correspondents in Morocco, writing for the journal El Globo. He began etching in 1900 and showed in the National Exhibition of Fine Arts of 1901, 1906, 1910, 1912, 1920, 1924, 1926, 1930 and 1936, winning a second-place medal in 1906 and a first-place medal in 1908 for several etchings.

On 31 May 1906, Mateu Morral, a Catalan anarchist, threw a bomb from a balcony on the Calle Mayor at the ceremonial coach of Alfonso XIII and Victoria Eugenia of Battenberg during their nuptial festivities. Failing in his attempted assassination, and with the Guardia Civil close on his heels, Morral committed suicide in Torrejón de Ardoz.

Morral's body was identified not by political cronies but by Valle-Inclán and Ricardo Baroja, who had met the regicidal Catalan during the tertulias at the Horchateria de Candelas in Madrid. Later, Ricardo drew a picture and an etching of Morral while Valle-Inclán and Pío portrayed him as the anarchist in their later writings.

In 1910, he co-founded the Society of Spanish Engravers, which regrouped as Los 24. They published about etching techniques in three issues of the journal La Estampa before being asked to publish in Circulo de Bellas Artes. In 1917, his first novel, Aventuras del submarino aleman U..., was published. He also assisted his brother-in-law, editor Rafael Caro Raggio (the husband of his sister Carmen), at his newly founded publishing house with the printing of Biblioteca de Arte, and in 1920, he published his second novel, Fernanda. In 1925, in a highly publicized conference at the Circulo de Bellas Artes, without giving names, he attacked the current vogue of art critics, specifically, Ricardo Gutiérrez Abascal (Juan de la Encina) and José Francés (1883–1964). The conference had a great impact, and critics now ostracised him.

== Theatre and film ==
On 5 September 1915, a theatre, Compañia de María Guerrero, premiered his first play, El Cometa (The Comet), in Bilbao. In 1919, at 48, he married his faithful partner, Carmen Monné. Also an artist, she was from an American family of French origin. They had met at the home of the painter Valentin Zubiaurre. On 8 February 1926, they inaugurated their amateur theatre group El Mirlo Blanco (The White Blackbird) at their home in Madrid, with the support of many intellectuals and notable playwrights such as Valle-Inclán, Edgar Neville, Cipriano Rivas Cherif and Claudio de la Torre (1895–1973). The following year, the group was dissolved by the dictatorship of Miguel Primo de Rivera, leading to protests.

In 1928, Ricardo was appointed professor at the Escuela Nacional de Artes Gráficas and returned to engraving, which he had abandoned since the death of his father in 1912. In these days, he frequented the tertulias (social gatherings) at the Cacharrería, Valle-Inclán's group at the Café la Granja de Henar and the Café Varela tertulia of Antonio Machado and his brother Manuel. He also acted in Nemesio M. Sobrevila's silent films, Al Hollywood Madrileño (1927; In Hollywood Madrid), and the avant-garde El Sexto sentido (The Sixth Sense), a film that was far ahead of its time and only had one public screening in 1929. El Sexto sentido is now considered a classic art film.

In 1931, returning from a rally in support of the Second Spanish Republic, he lost his right eye in an automobile accident in Navalcarnero, near Madrid, which forced him to abandon painting and engraving and devote himself to writing. He was awarded the National Prize for Literature in 1935 for his novel La Nao Capitana. Later, it was adapted into a film starring Paola Barbara and Jesús Tordesillas in (1947).

== Spanish Civil War ==
The sudden uprising of the Spanish Civil War saw the home of Carmen and Ricardo destroyed in a bombing raid along with all his literary work. Taken completely by surprise, the new refugees went to stay at Itzea, Pío's home in Vera de Bidasoa in northern Navarre. Pío had fled to France and the family remained at Itzea for the duration of the war, cut off from family and friends and painting and writing only during the summer months. During this time, he painted 70 Itzea tables with the themes of war, perhaps the largest contribution of any artist to the disasters of the Spanish Civil War.

== Afterward ==
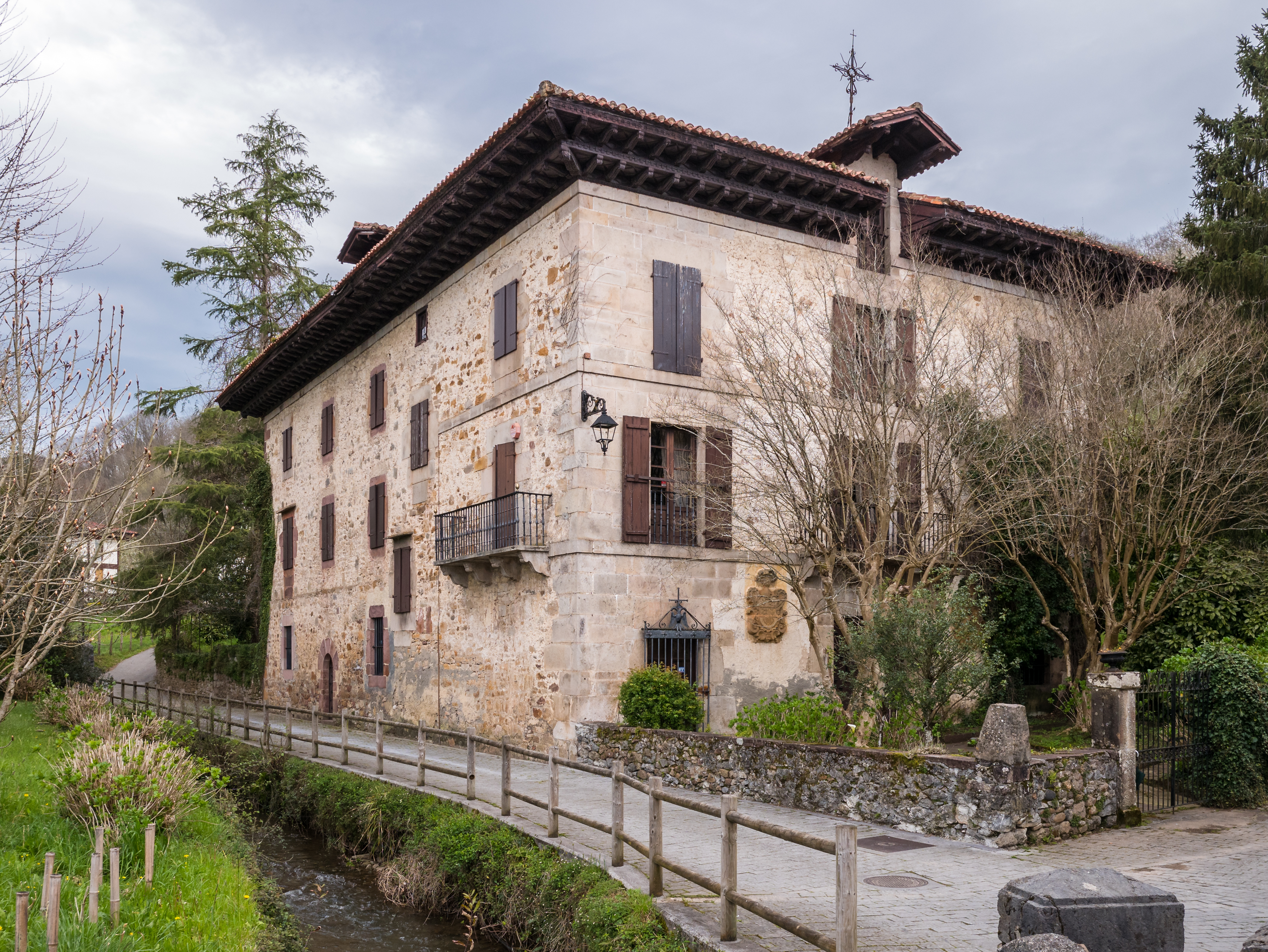
Baroja's house in Vera de Bidasoa

In 1940, he held exhibitions at galleries in San Sebastián, Bilbao and Madrid; he even began to compose music. In 1949, along with the painter Ascensio Martiarena Lascurain, he founded the Asociación Artística de Guipúzcoa (Art Association of Guipúzcoa) and held two art exhibitions in San Sebastián; one of etchings (January) and the other of oils (August). At his last exhibition in San Sebastián (1952), all his paintings were sold. He was 81 and almost blind.

In 1926, his good friend Valle-Inclán wrote in the prologue for Ricardo's new book, El Pedigree, remarking on the merit of his companion:

Ricardo Baroja is loved by the Muses. Not one of the nine sisters has denied him her gift.

Had he pursued the graphic arts, he would have outdone the best. I imagine him in an Italian city, a painter in the days of the Renaissance. That rare ability to conceive and to execute quickly makes him brilliantly capable of doing grand mural works. What paradoxical humor he would have shown in training his disciples from the scaffolding, in welcoming rulers, in having discussions with cardinals! Verbal grace, frank humor, pleasant laughter, paradoxical flights are also distinctive in Ricardo Baroja - beloved of the Muses - who, eschewing romantic sputterings, heads toward old age.

He died on 19 December 1953 in Vera de Bidosoa of tongue cancer caused by his fondness for pipe smoking and snuff. In March 1959, his widow, Carmen Monné, organized an exhibition in homage to Ricardo at the Salas Municipales de Arte (Chambers Municipal Art Gallery) of San Sebastián. Their old friends, the Ducloux sisters, were responsible for gathering all the works available from valuable private collections. In 1995 the town council of his birthplace, Minas de Río Tinto, renamed a street to Avenida Ricardo Baroja.

== Writings ==
- Aventuras del submarino aleman U... (1917; Adventures of the German submarine U...)
- Fernanda, (1920)
- El pedigree, (1926)
- Los tres retratos, (1930)
- La Nao Capitana: Cuento Español del mar antiquo, (1935; The Flagship)
- La tribu de halcón: Cuento prehistorico de actualidad y el coleccionista de relámpagos, (1940)
- Bienandanzas y fortunas, (1941)
- Pasan y se van, (1941)
- Clavijo: tres versiones de una vida, (1942)
- El Dorado, (1942)
- Los dos hermanos piratas (Cuento del mar Mediterraneo), (1945)
- Gente del 98 (1952; People of the Generation of 98)

== Films ==
- 1927 Al Hollywood Madrileño (In Hollywood Madrid), Nemesio Sobrevila (director). Silent
- 1928 Zalacaín el aventurero (Zalacaín the Adventurer), Francisco Camacho (director). Silent/lost
- 1929 El sexto sentido (The Sixth Sense), Nemesio Sobrevila (director). Silent
- 1931 La incorregible, (Manslaughter), Leo Mitller (director). Sound/mono
- 1947 La Nao Capitana, (The Flagship; adapted from his novel), Florián Rey (director).
