= Serafin Baroja =

Basque writer

Serafín Baroja
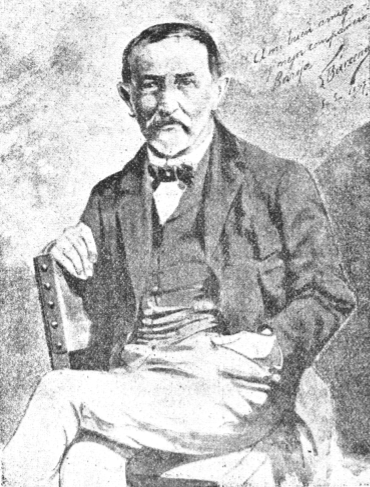
- Serafín Baroja
- Born: 22 September 1840; San Sebastián, Spain
- Died: 16 July 1912 (aged 71); Vera de Bidasoa
- Occupation: Writer
- Children: Ricardo Baroja (1871–1953); Pío Baroja (1872–1956); Carmen Baroja (1883–1950)
- Writing career
- Notable works: El Urumea, Bay, jauna, bay, Pudente

Serafín Baroja (22 September 1840 – 16 July 1912) was a Spanish writer and mining engineer who wrote popular Basque poetry and lyrics. He was the father of a trio of children who were influential towards the art and literature of 20th-century Spain: Ricardo Baroja, painter, engraver and writer; Pío Baroja, novelist and essayist who ranks as one of the major writers of Spain's Generation of 98; and Carmen Baroja, writer, ethnologist and co-founder of the Lyceum Women's Club in Madrid.

== Life ==
Set of bertso poems fashioned by Baroja dedicated to fire bull

Serafín was born in San Sebastián, the son of Pío Baroja Zornotza, publisher of the newspaper El Liberal Guipuzcoano ("The Guipuscoan Liberal") during the Trienio Liberal. Serafín's grandfather, Rafael Martínez Baroja (born 1770), had been the printer of the newspaper La Papeleta de Oyarzun ("The Ballot of Oiartzun") during the Peninsular War against Napoleon I. Serafín studied mine engineering at the Polytechnic School of Engineering in Madrid, where he befriended the politician Pascual Madoz. In 1866, he married Carmen Nessi y Goñi (1849–1935), who was of Italian and Basque descent. After completing his studies, he went down to the ancient copper mines of Minas de Río Tinto in Huelva as chief engineer in 1868.

Dario, his first son, was born in 1869, followed by Ricardo on 12 January 1870. Disillusioned when he saw that the mines were going to be sold to a group of English investors (later becoming the British-Australian consortium the Rio Tinto Group), he moved his family to San Sebastián and devoted himself to writing novels, operas and operettas. Their third son, Pío, was born on 28 December 1872.

From January to February 1876, he was a correspondent on the front of the Third Carlist War for the newspaper El Tiempo ("The Time"). Three years after the war ended, Serafín created the newspaper El Urumea ("The Urumea", 1879–1895), devoted to "news, not politics". Run by his brother Ricardo, the first issue came out on 1 May 1879. That year, his mining expertise took the family to Madrid. where he was assigned to lecture at the Instituto Geográfico y Estadístico (Institute of Geography and Statistics). Two years later. he was the chief mining engineer in Pamplona, where, in 1883, his daughter Carmen was born.

In Pamplona, he founded Bay, jauna, bay (Bai, jauna, bai in Standard Basque, "Yes, Sir, Yes"), a bilingual weekly periodical and the first in Basque/Castilian, which lasted only six issues. The next year, he wrote the libretto for the first Basque opera, Pudente, a story set in the mines of Rio Tinto at the time of Trajan. Composed by José Antonio Santesteban, it premiered in San Sebastián in 1884. He also wrote the lyrics for the March of San Sebastián composed by Raimundo Sarriegui which is performed in the Tamborrada festival every 20 January, the Feast of San Sebastián.

In 1886, when he went to the mines in Biscay he sent his family to stay with his sister-in-law, Juana Nessi and her husband, Matías Lacasa, who owned a Viennese café and bakery in Madrid named Viena Capellanes, today a chain of popular cafés and catering service. In 1893, he took his family with him to the mines at Burjassot near Valencia, returning the next year to Madrid to help Juana Nessi, whose husband had just died. Serafín attempted to resurrect his Basque/Castilian periodical, Bay, jauna, bai, by selling copies at the bakery. He also collaborated on the magazine El Eco de San Sebastián ("The Echo of San Sebastián") and the republican newspaper La Voz de Guipúzcoa ("The Voice of Guipuscoa"), which, in 1895, published the serial De Chamberí a Madrid, 100 metros en 25 días ("From Chamberí to Madrid, 100 Meters in 25 Days"). In 1986, his frontline reporting for El Tiempo was published as Crónica de la guerra Carlista. Enero y Febrero de 1876 ("Chronicle of the Carlist War: January and February 1876") with a prologue by his grandson, Julio Caro Baroja.

His wife, Carmen, always tried to build up a seriousness of purpose in her husband, but he was known as a great joker with an enthusiasm for people and life. His easygoing attitude and love for the arts and sciences had an influence on his children's careers; Ricardo left his career as an archivist for the Bohemian life of the artist; and Pío the practice of medicine to become a novelist. Carmen, as a woman, had to rebel against the traditions that defined her gender to become a writer, an ethnologist and a co-founder of the first feminist group in Spain.

In 1875, he coined the term jai alai (merry festival) for the game of Basque pelota. He died on 16 July 1912 in Vera de Bidasoa and is buried with his wife Carmen. The Parque Serafín Baroja in San Sebastián is named after him.
