= Julio Peris Brell =

Spanish painter (1866–1944)

- Born: 29 January 1866; Valencia, Spain
- Died: 9 December 1944 (aged 78); Valencia, Spain
- Occupation: Painter
- Spouse: Inocencia Blanco Gimeno
- Children: Julia, Mª Ana and Vicenta

Julio Peris Brell (29 January 1866 – 9 December 1944) was a Spanish painter from the Valencian Community. Peris Brell's paintings are distinguished by the power of his technique for analysing and translating different light aspects, specially in landscapes genres, portrait and still life.

== Life ==
Julio Peris Brell was born in the street 'En Bany' of Valencia, Spain, in a family of liberal tradition, of the small bourgeoisie. He began his studies of fine arts in 1876. In 1882, he was proclaimed secretary of the section of partners painters of the Scientific, Literary and Artistic Athenian of Valencia. He finished his studies of fine arts in 1884. In 1886, he becomes great partner of the Athenian, proposed by the painters Ignacio Pinazo Camarlench, Navarrese Jose Llorens and Honorio Romero Orozco.

In 1890 he presents the work 'The faith of the baptism' in the National Exhibition of Fine Arts in Madrid. He met the brothers Ricardo and Pío Baroja, with whom he maintained a long friendship.

After the creation of the Circle of Beautiful Arts of Valencia, in 1894, Peris Brell participates in the activities with his friend, the painter Joaquín Agrasot, concurring to the first exhibitions of the organization.

The biggest part of the Peris Brell's production, at the end of the 19th century, was directed to the Catalan market. In 1897 he presents the painting 'La Fuente ' to the National Exhibition of Fine Arts of Mexico, being acquired by the National School of Beautiful Arts of Mexico. It also participates in several exhibitions organized by the Academy of Fine Arts of Cádiz and the Exhibition of Fine Arts of Murcia.

In 1900 he is chosen unanimously for the position of president of the Section of Class of the Circle of Fine Arts of Valencia. The same year takes part in the decoration of the 'palacete de Don Jose Ayora', in company of Ignacio Pinazo Camarlench, Antonio Fillol, Ricardo Verde and Luis Beüt. He makes the painting 'Brindis'. A year later concurs to the National Exhibition of Beautiful Arts with the titled painting 'My mother'.

He contracts marriage with Inocencia Blanca Gimeno in 1901, widow and mother of three children: Amparo, Salvadora and Tomás. Two years later his first daughter is born, Julia. In 1909 the twins Mª Ana and Vicenta are born. The same year he is chosen librarian of the Modern School.

In 1911 begins a sporadic graphical collaboration in the magazine 'Letras y Figuras'. He entered to the new Circle of Fine Arts in 1912, after the overcoming in the organization of the split of a group of artists. He also took part in a tribute to Ignacio Pinazo Camarlench. In 1913 it is proclaimed president of the section of celebrations of the Circle of Fine Arts. A year later promotes president of the Painting section of the Circle of Fine Arts.

In 1916 his friend Jose Benlliure Ortiz dies. In 1919 his great friend Joaquín Agrasot dies, too.

The pintura costumbrista style, that had rooted in the central years of the 19th century and principles of the 20th century, receives new shades with the influence of Vicente Blasco Ibáñez in the world of the art, with his novels he gives another perfection of the rural world, different like the vision of the static costumbrism. But Peris Brell impregnates of landscapes all the compositions with a subtle costumbrist shade, giving a special effect to the spectator.

In 1923 he presents 31 works in the exhibition 'Manifestación de Arte Valenciano', celebrated in the palace of the Buen Retiro in Madrid, dedicating to him a room. The 10 August his friend and teacher Joaquín Sorolla dies.

In 1924 he displays in the National Exhibition of Fine Arts, his works 'A plena luz' and ‘Barraca valenciana'. He participates in the Exhibition of Spanish Artists, organized in Buenos Aires in 1925 by Alejandro Pardiñas Cabré.

He begins to participate regularly in the Imperium Galery from 1926. On 6 December a group of friends pay a tribute to him in the Victoria's Spas. In 1928 the Real Academy of Fine Arts of San Carlos chooses him academic of number. He achieves a great success in the exhibitions organized by the Circle of Fine Arts, as well as in the exhibition 'Pintura Catalana de Grans Mestres del segle XIX'’ (Catalan Painting of Great Teachers of the 19th Century) organized in Barcelona by Galeries Laietanes in 1931. The same year, the Provincial Delegation of Valencia names him jury for the oppositions of the painting pension.

In 1933 it concurs to 'Exposició d'Artistes Valencians Reunits'(Exhibition of Reunited Valencian Artists), organized by the gallery Emporium, in the traditional exhibition of the July's Fair, organized by the Circle of Fine Arts; and in the exhibition of painting and sculpture organized by the Industrial and Mercantile Federation of Valencia.

It participates in the Regional Exhibition of Fine Arts of 1934. This same year returns to be named member court for the painting pension summoned by the Provincial Delegation of Valencia.

It concurs with success, from the public and of the critic, to III the Regional Exhibition of Fine Arts (1935) organized by the Circle of Fine Arts and sponsored by the City council of Valencia. By popular voting, the medal of the newspaper 'La Voz Valenciana' is granted to him.

He concurs to the Exhibition 'Pro Milicies', in the Literary University, organized by Alliance of Intellectuals in Defense of the Culture in 1936, and sponsored by the Popular Athenian of Valencia.

The Prat gallery organizes in his honor an anthological exhibition of his works in 1943. In 1944 he concurs to the Exhibition of Flowers and Still lifes, organized by the Circle of Fine Arts of Valencia and to the collective exhibition of painters in the Mateu's Gallery. The 19 December pass away in their address of the Ciscar Street in Valencia.
