= Consuelo Álvarez Pool =

Spanish writer, journalist and feminist

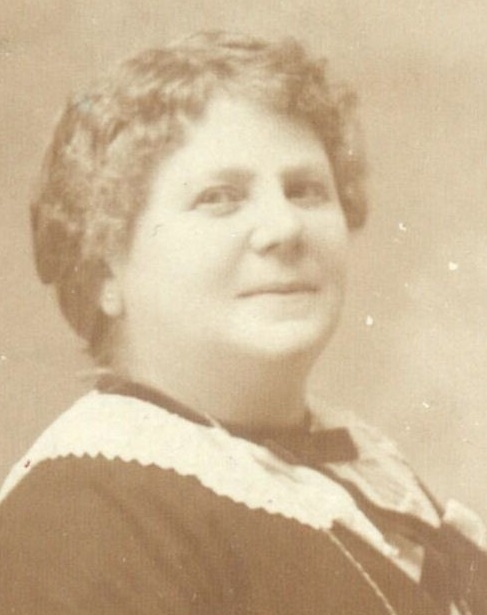
- Born: July 24, 1867; Barcelona, Spain
- Died: January 19, 1959 (aged 91); Madrid, Spain
- Other name: Violeta
- Occupations: Telegrapher, journalist, feminist, politician
- Criminal charges: Freemasonry
- Criminal penalty: 12 years in prison

Consuelo Álvarez Pool, known by her pseudonym "Violeta" (July 24, 1867 – January 19, 1959) was a Spanish writer, journalist, politician, trade unionist, suffragist, and feminist. She belonged to the first organization of women telegraphers in Spain.

== Career ==
=== Telegrapher ===
Consuelo Álvarez Pool studied at the Escuela de Telégrafos, founded by the Asociación para la Enseñanza de la Mujer, where the students studied for two years, obtained the title of telegrapher and afterward tested for Telégrafos. Her job involved transmitting and receiving messages in morse code in telegraph offices.

When she was 17 years old her father died and her family fell into hardship. She decided to seek economic emancipation and study to join the Cuerpo de Telégrafos. On April 15, 1885, she passed the entrance exam to be a temporary assistant in Telégrafos; it was the first time someone made an exam accessible to single women older than 16, but it was not until 1909 that that access was definitive. She began working in international business since she was fluent in several languages. That year her daughter Esther Azcaráte Álvarez and fellow notable Spanish feminist Clara Campoamor also got jobs as telegraphers.

She belonged to the Cuerpo de Telégrafos until her retirement at 65 years old. She was head of press of the first press office of Telégrafos created in 1915, union representative in the Sindicato de Telégrafos, and a driving force in the creation of the Escuela Técnica Superior de Ingenieros de Telecomunicación.

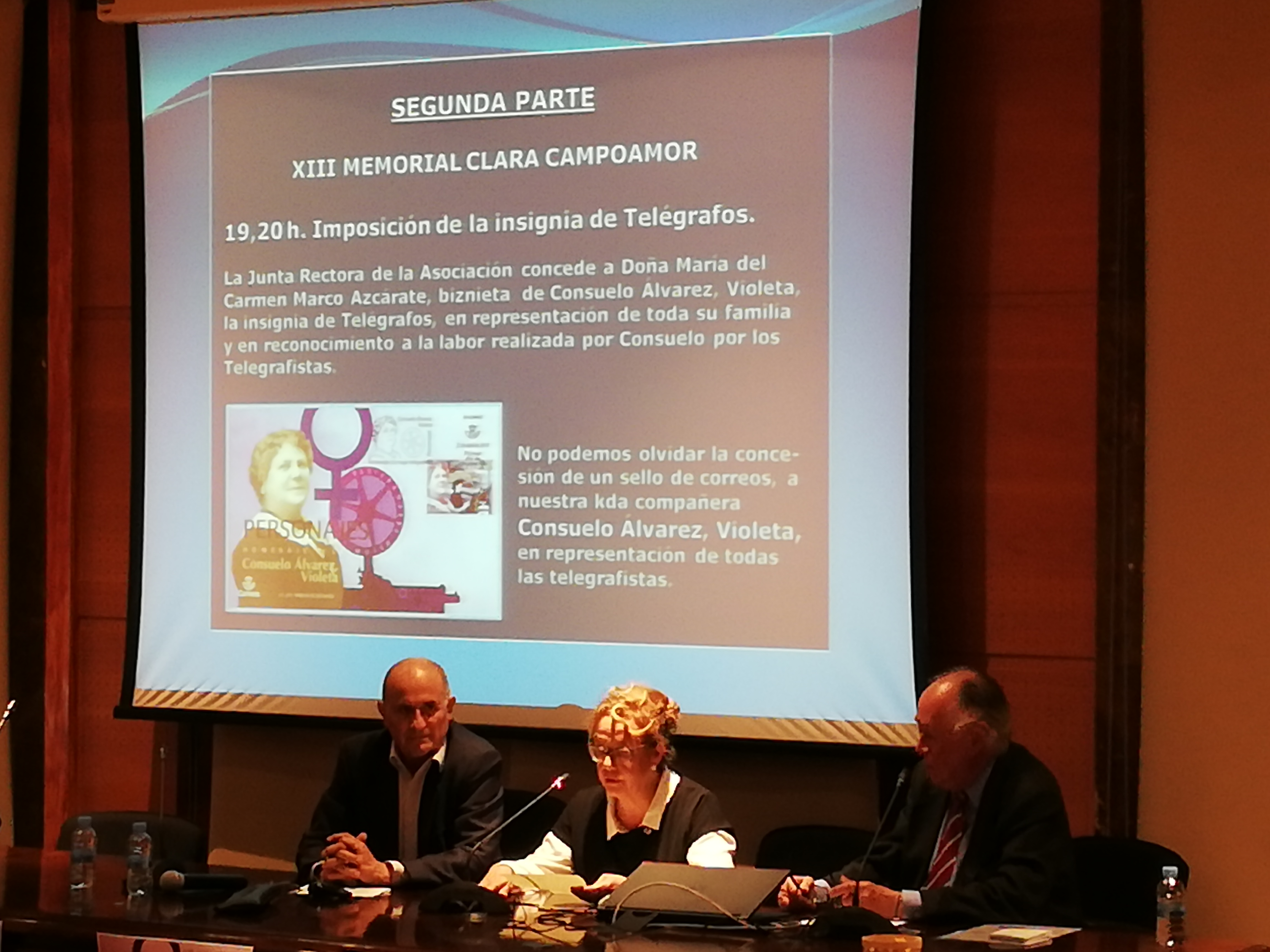

On November 8, 2018, the "Comisión Filatélica del Estado" approved the issuance of a stamp dedicated to the Telegrapher Woman, with the image of Consuelo Álvarez Pool, "Violeta". On April 22, 2019, a postal envelope and the stamp with the image of Violeta was put into circulation within the series "Personajes". Additionally The Asociación de Amigos del Telégrafo, in the mark of XIII Memorial Clara Campoamor, gave an installment of the insignia of telegraphy to Carmen Marco Azcárete, great-granddaughter of Álvarez Pool, recognizing her whole family and the work that Álvarez Pool did for women telegraphers.

=== Journalist ===
She started reporting in Oviedo, where she moved after separating from her husband. Afterwards, she moved to Madrid and began to work at the newspaper El Pais, diario republicano-progresista in a permanent position. She was assigned to write about "women’s issues" – fashion, kitchen, and home – and so she adopted the pseudonym of Violeta. Under that name, she wrote about divorce, women's rights to education and to equal working conditions, prison reform, defense of the working class, violence against women, and more.

Consuelo Álvarez considered it necessary to write to tell the stories of the poverty and misfortune she saw around her. She also thought of the press’ job in those terms: “The mission of the press is not just to write about important events, but also to instruct, moralize, and revolutionize." (Translation)

In current studies about women in journalism Consuelo Álvarez, Violeta is recognized as one of the pioneers, and she is reflected as such in Spanish Writers in the Press 1868–1936. In 1907 she was admitted into the Asociación de la Prensa de Madrid with Carmen de Burgos, Columbine. The press card gave them a professional recognition, being the first two women journalists to join an editorial department, Carmen de Burgos in that of the newspaper Heraldo de Madrid, and Consuelo Álvarez in that of the El Pais, diario republicano-progresista.

== Activism and involvement ==
=== Activism ===
As said by her biographer and researcher Victoria Crespo Gutiérrez, Director of the Telegraph and Postal Museum:

“Consuelo Álvarez Pool was a part of the first generation of female telegraphers. She belonged to telegraphers for more than 40 years. She was a magnificent writer, a member of the feminine generation of 98, defender of women’s rights, and regular participant in conferences and social gatherings of the Literatura del Ateneo of Madrid . She was preoccupied, throughout her entire life, about social issues, as is reflected in her writing and her participation in representative organizations of telegraphy staff.(Translation)

She actively defended women's access to education, by which women could achieve economic independence and not have to consider marriage as the only essential means for survival. Her defense of the right to divorce, recognized in her writing and conferences, is currently an object of investigation and study in academic theses. She was accompanied in this fight by other women such as Carmen de Burgos, Columbine, and her own daughter Esther Azcárate Álvarez.

Her anticlerical thinking was expressed in writing, conferences, and rallies, and was recognized in the press of the era, for example in the meeting of "Anti-Vatican" women celebrated in the Casino de la calle Esparteros de Madrid, the feminist rally celebrated in the Barbieri theater of Madrid on July 4, 1910, or the participation in the cycle of conference organized by the Sindicato de Empleados de Banca y Bolsa de Madrid in Madrid in October 1931, in which her dissertation was about "the social relationship between religion and capitalism".

=== Political and cultural involvement ===
She was an active participant in cultural life, she belonged to the Ateneo de Madrid (1907–1936) where she participated in conferences, attended gathering and literary debates. For much of her life she maintained correspondence with fellow literati and politicians, especially with her friend Benito Pérez Galdós (in whose house there are 7 preserved cards from Álvarez Pool), Rafael Salinas, Belén de Sárraga, Rosario de Acuña, Joaquín Costa, Manuel Azaña, Miguel de Unamuno, y Santiago Alba, among others.

She was very involved in politics, and she was a candidate for the Federal Democratic Republican Party in the 1931 elections in Madrid, but she was not elected . Along with her friend Clara Campoamor of the Radical Party, she defended the women's right to vote.

Consuelo Álvarez Pool also belonged to the Freemasonry, under the symbolic name Costa, and was initiated in the Logia de Adopción Ibérica no. 67 in 1910.

During the civil war she was repressed and punished for her outspokenness by the Nationalists. The Francoist regime applied the Ley de represión de la Masonería y el Comunismo, being judged by the Tribunal Especial para la Represión de la Masonería y el Comunismo, voting 480–44 against Consuelo Álvarez Pool and condemning her to 12 years in prison. She completed her punishment on a provisional sentence due to her age of 77 years and her very deteriorated health.

== Works ==
She was part of the Generation of '98, included among others such as Emilia Pardo Bazán, Carmen de Burgos "Columbine", Sofía Casanova, Patrocinio de Biedma, Rosario Acuña, Blanca de los Ríos Lampérez, Carmen Baroja, Mará de la O Lejárraga, Regina de Lamo, and María de Maeztu. As a writer, she was recognizer by the writer and literary critic Rafael Cansinos Asséns for her work La nueva literatura, volumen II La literatura feminina (1917) and by the Universidad Autónoma de Madrid professor Raquel Arias Careaga, in an article published in March 2019 entitled Poetas Españoles en la penumbra.

=== Stories ===
- 1900. La Pasionaria, La medalla de la Virgen, Las Amapolas, El Ramo de Claveles, El Primer Vals y Hojas caídas.
- Cuentos de "El País". There are 24 stories published between 1904 and 1916, in which Violeta wrote about women's rights, the lower class, prostitution, mistreatment of women and children, workplace harassment, eviction, antimilitarism, and more. Most of the main characters are women.
- Stories published in the revista La Vida Socialista.

=== Poetry ===
Her poetry was primarily published in the newspapers in which she wrote.

- 12 poems in El Progreso de Asturias between 1902 and 1903, which appeared on the first page, were generally about love, and were signed by Consuelo Álvarez.
- 14 poems collected in El País (1909–1919).
- One poem in Vida Socialista.

=== Literary criticism ===
- Monógrafos oratorios de Mariano Aramburu Machado
- El huerto de Epiceto de Antonio Zozaya.

=== Articles on social life and travel ===
- Impresiones de un viaje (1907)
- Catalanas (1909–1910)
- Veraniegas (1911)
- Santanderinas, Aldeanas y Viajeras (1912)
- Alicantinas (1913)
- Viajeras (1913)
- Por tierras gallegas (1916)

=== Literary prologues and epilogues ===
- Modulaciones de Manuel Camacho Beneytez (1914)
- ¡Mujeres! Siluetas femeninas de Juan García Cobacho (1930)

=== Translations from French ===
- Los amores de Gambetta

=== Novels ===
- La Casona del Pinar. An autobiographical novel, she narrates the life of three generations of the family Hidalgo de Mendoza.
