= Pío Caro Baroja =

Spanish film director (1928–2015)

- Born: 5 April 1928; Madrid, Spain
- Died: 30 November 2015 (aged 87); Málaga, Spain
- Occupation(s): Film and television director, screenwriter

Pío Caro Baroja (5 April 1928 – 30 November 2015) was a Spanish film and television director, screenwriter, and author.

== Biography ==
Pío Caro Baroja was born on 5 April 1928 in Madrid, Spain. He was the fourth son of the editor Rafael Caro Raggio, who founded the publishing house Editorial Caro Raggio Madrid in 1917. His mother was Carmen Baroja Nessi, a Spanish writer and ethnologist who wrote under the pseudonym Vera Alzate. He was a nephew of the novelist Pío Baroja and brother of the Basque anthropologist Julio Caro Baroja. He earned a law degree at the University of Madrid. He later emigrated to Mexico, where he worked as a film critic and later as a documentary maker.

After the death of his uncle, Pío Baroja, Caro returned to Spain, and along with his brother Julio, he devoted himself to documenting Spanish folklore, initially collaborating with No-Do and later with Televisión Española.

Pio Caro also turned to writing. Among his works are El gachupín ("The Spaniard"), En busca de la juventud perdida ("In Search of Lost Youth"), El águila y la serpiente ("The Eagle and the Snake"), and La barca de Caronte ("Charon's Boat").

== Filmography ==
=== As director ===
- El mayorazgo de Labraz (1983, TV miniseries)
- Navarra, las cuatro estaciones (1972)
- Las vidrieras de la catedral de Toledo (1972)
- De mar a mar por los Pirineos (1971)
- El castillo medieval (1969)
- La ciudad medieval (1969)
- El pueblo medieval (1969)
- Romería de la Virgen de la Peña (1969)
- El País Vasco de Pío Baroja (1967)
- El País Vasco (1966)
- La última vuelta del camino (1965)
- El Carnaval de Lanz (1964)
- Los diablos danzantes (1964)
- El Greco en Toledo (1959)
- El entierro del conde de Orgaz (1959)

=== As writer ===
- De mar a mar por los Pirineos (1971)
- Romería de la Virgen de la Peña (1969)
- La última vuelta del camino (1965)
- El Greco en Toledo (1959)
- El entierro del conde de Orgaz (1959)
