= The Tree of Knowledge (novel) =

1911 novel by Pío Baroja

- Title page for El árbol de la ciencia (1961)
- Author: Pío Baroja
- Original title: El árbol de la ciencia
- Translator: Aubrey F. G. Bell
- Language: Spanish
- Genre: Autobiographical novel
- Publication date: 1911
- Publication place: Spain
- Media type: Print (hardback)

The Tree of Knowledge (Spanish: El árbol de la ciencia) is a novel written by Pío Baroja and published in 1911. The action takes place between 1887 and 1898. It is a semi-autobiographical work divided into two symmetrical parts (I–III and V–VII), separated by a long philosophical conversation between the protagonist and his uncle, Doctor Iturrioz (IV).

== Plot summary ==
The first part of the novel deals with the life of the medicine student Andrés Hurtado. Through his family, teachers, classmates and diverse friends, Baroja draws a merciless painting of the bourgeois and proletarian 19th-century inhabitants of Madrid.

The second half of the novel tells the stay of Hurtado (now a doctor) in Alcolea, a fictitious town in Castilla–La Mancha (where the author shows the dreadful conditions the peasant had to endure such as caciquism, ignorance, apathy or resignation), his return to Madrid (where he works as a hygiene doctor – emphasizing the description that Baroja makes of prostitution in 19th-century Madrid) and, finally, his unfortunate marriage to Lulú, a young woman he met when he was a student.

IV is in direct dialogue (it is totally different from the rest of the novel in which third-person narration is predominant) and contrasts the English pragmatism (supported by Doctor Iturrioz) to the German idealism that Andrés Hurtado defends.
