= Leopoldo Cano =

Spanish soldier, poet and playwright

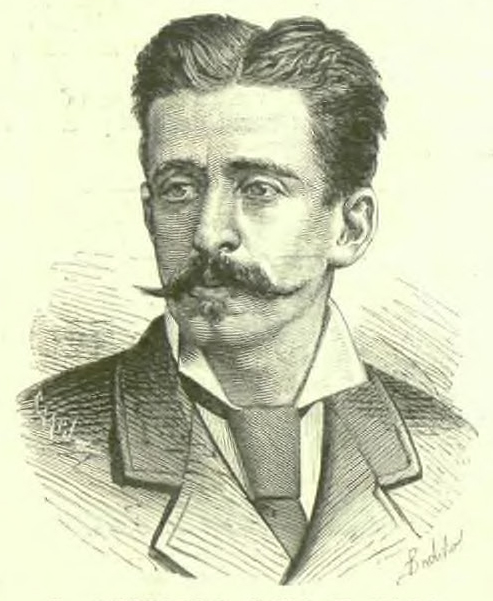
- ca.1878
- Born: Leopoldo Cano y Masas; 13 November 1844; Valladolid, Spain
- Died: 9 April 1934 (aged 89); Madrid, Spain

Seat a of the Real Academia Española
- In office 19 June 1910 (Note: Elected on 27 May 1909) – 9 April 1934
- Preceded by: Antonio Hernández Fajarnés
- Succeeded by: Pío Baroja

Leopoldo Cano y Masas (13 November 1844 – 9 April 1934) was a Spanish soldier, poet and playwright associated with the Realist movement.

Cano was elected to seat a of the Real Academia Española on 27 May 1909, he took up his seat on 19 June 1910.
