= Guillermo Díaz-Plaja =

Spanish literary critic and historian

Guillermo Diaz-Plaja
- Guillermo Díaz-Plaja
- Born: Guillermo Diaz-Plaja Contestí; 24 May 1909; Manresa, Spain
- Died: 27 July 1984 (aged 75); Barcelona, Spain
- Occupations: Literary critic, historian, essayist, philologist, poet

Seat P of the Real Academia Española
- In office 5 November 1967 – 27 July 1984
- Preceded by: José Martínez Ruiz
- Succeeded by: Julio Caro Baroja

Guillermo Diaz-Plaja Contestí (24 May 1909 – 27 July 1984) was a Spanish literary critic, historian, essayist, and poet.

== Biography ==
Guillermo Díaz Plaja was born in Manresa, the son of an army officer, on 25 May 1909. A few weeks later, the family moved to Barcelona. Here he studied at the Colegio de Escuelas Pías, and in Girona, where he spent his adolescence, with the Marist Brothers. He began his studies of Philosophy and Letters at the University of Barcelona when he was living in Lleida, taking the exams as an external student in the first year. Since 1927, by which time he was already established in the city of Barcelona, he was an official student. His university colleagues included Miquel Batllori, Carlos Clavería, Juan Ramón Masoliver and Ana Maria Saavedra. He graduated in 1930 with academic excellence, and went to Madrid the following year to get a doctorate at the Central University, where he was a disciple of, among other teachers, Ramón Menéndez Pidal.

In 1932 he started his career as a teacher at the Institut Escola de Barcelona. At just 26 years old, he won the National Prize for Literature for Introducción al estudio del Romanticismo español (Madrid, Espasa-Calpe, 1936) and in 1961 the City of Barcelona essay prize, for Viatge a l'Atlàntida i retorn a Ítaca (Barcelona, Destino, 1962). He was professor at the Jaime Balmes Institute since 1935 and professor at the University School of Business Studies of the University of Barcelona from 1972 until his retirement in 1979.

He was professor at the San Jorge Superior School of Fine Arts and at the Barcelona Provincial Council's School of Commerce, also in that city. He directed the Barcelona Theater Institute from 1939 to 1970 and the Spanish National Book Institute from 1966 to 1970. He belonged to the CSIC, the Hispanic Society, the Royal Spanish Academy and the Reial Acadèmia de Bones Lletres de Barcelona, as well as other Spanish and foreign institutions. He chaired the Association of Literary Critics and the Association of Spanish Writers and Artists from 1979 until 1984. He was a Doctor Honoris Causa of the Universities of San Marcos in Peru (1973), of Cuyo in Argentina (1981), and of Strasbourg (1982). He wrote more than two hundred works, including popular books, didactics, poetry books, essays and anthologies.

His work of research focused on various stages in the history of literature, with studies on Modernism, Romanticism and Baroque. He analyzed the work of relevant authors of Spanish poetry, such as Federico García Lorca, Juan Ramón Jiménez and Valle Inclán. His works on the figure of Eugenio d'Ors deserve special attention. Other literary activities included the creation of anthologies, magazine management, text editing and the coordination of works. In the latter field, his Historia general de las literaturas hispánicas stands out. In this work the studies on the various Spanish literatures carried out by the most accredited specialists are integrated. His didactic work, carried out in universities and from textbooks, trained several generations of Spanish and Hispanic students.

Parallel to his literary studies, he worked in four other major fields: first, there are his autobiographical works, such as his Memoria de una generación destruid (1966); second, the issues on the current cultural scene, of journalistic type; thirdly, travel literature (Díaz-Plaja considered travelling "a way of getting knowledge of the world, of trying to capture, under the most superficial chromaticisms, the common roots on which humanity is based"), made up of essays on countries from the five continents and, finally, poetry. Regarding his work in the Catalan language, his early studies on cinema or the avant-garde, his poetic work, and his role as a bridge in the dialogue of Spanish cultures deserve special attention.

== Major works ==
=== History of literature ===
- Historia General de las Literaturas Hispánicas, Barcelona, Editorial Barna, 1949-1967 (seis vols).
- Hispanoamérica en su Literatura, Estella, Editorial Salvat, 1970 (Biblioteca Básica Salvat, volumen 67).

=== Editing ===
- Gustavo Adolfo Bécquer, Obras, Barcelona, Vergara, 1962.

=== Poetry ===
- Primer cuaderno de sonetos, Cádiz, Col. Isla (Graf. Salvador Repeto), 1941.
- Las elegías de Granada, Madrid, Fantasía, 1945.
- Intimidad, Barcelona, Las ediciones de la Espiga, 1946.
- Vacación de estío, Madrid, Col. Adonais, 1948.
- Cartas de navegar, Madrid, Afrodisio Aguado, 1949.
- Vencedor de mi muerte, Madrid, Ínsula, 1953 (Prólogo de Paul Claudel).
- Los adioses, Barcelona, Las Ediciones de la Espiga, 1962.
- Belén lírico, Málaga, Librería Anticuaria El Guadalhorce, 1966.
- La soledad caminante, Poemas de América del Norte, Málaga, Ángel Caffarena, 1965.
- El arco bajo las estrellas, Barcelona, Las Ediciones de San Jorge, 1965.
- Les claus, Barcelona, Les Edicions de l’Espiga, 1965
- La soledad caminante, Poemas del Norte de América, Málaga, Librería Anticuaria El Guadalhorce, 1966.
- Zoo, Málaga, Librería Anticuaria El Guadalhorce, 1966.
- Poesía junta, Buenos Aires, Losada, 1967.
- América vibra en mí, Madrid, Cultura Hispánica, 1969.
- Las llaves, Santander, La isla de los ratones, 1972.
- Poemas de Oceanía, León, Editorial de la Institución Fray Bernardino de Sahagún, 1972.
- Poesía en 30 años (1941-1971), Barcelona, Plaza y Janés, 1972.
- Poemas en el mar de Grecia, Salamanca, Álamo, 1973.
- Poemas y Canciones del Brasil, Madrid, Cultura Hispánica, 1974.
- Conciencia del otoño, Madrid, Oriens, 1975.
- Atlas lírico, Barcelona, Plaza y Janés, 1978.

=== Essays ===
- Epistolario de Goya, Barcelona, Editoria Mentora, 1928.
- L'avantguardisme a Catalunya, Barcelona, Publicaciones La Revista, 1932.
- Rubén Darío, Barcelona, Sociedad General de Publicaciones, 1930.
- Introducción al estudio del romanticismo español, Madrid, Espasa Calpe, 1936.
- La poesía lírica española, Barcelona, Labor, 1937.
- La ventana de papel (ensayos sobre el fenómeno literario), Barcelona, Apolo, 1939.
- El espíritu del Barroco, Barcelona, Apolo, 1940.
- La poesía y el pensamiento de Ramón de Basterra, Barcelona, Juventud, 1941.
- Hacia un concepto de la literatura española, Buenos Aires, Espasa Calpe, 1942.
- El engaño de los ojos, Barcelona, Destino, 1943.
- Historia de la Literatura Española, Barcelona, La Espiga,
- Esquema de la historia del teatro, Barcelona, Instituto del Teatro, 1944.
- Federico García Lorca, Buenos Aires, Guillermo Kraft, 1948.
- Modernismo frente a noventa y ocho, Madrid, Espasa Calpe, 1951.
- Defensa de la crítica y otras notas, Barcelona, Editorial Barna, 1953.
- Veinte glosas en memoria de Eugenio d'Ors, Barcelona, Sección de prensa de la Diputación de Barcelona, 1955.
- El estilo de San Ignacio y otras páginas, Barcelona, Noguer, 1956.
- Cuestión de límites, Madrid, Revista de Occidente, 1963.
- El estudio de la literatura, Barcelona, Sayma, 1963.
- Las estéticas de Valle Inclán, Madrid, Gredos, 1965.
- Memoria de una generación destruida (1930-1936), Barcelona, Delos-Aymá S.L., 1966
- Los monstruos y otras literaturas, Barcelona, Plaza y Janés, 1967.
- La letra y el instante, Madrid, Editora Nacional, 1967.
- Con variado rumbo, Barcelona, Planeta, 1967.
- África por la cintura, Barcelona, Juventud, 1967.
- La linterna intermitente: anotaciones a la actualidad cultural, Madrid, Prensa Española, 1967.
- Trópicos, Valencia, Prometeo, 1968.
- La literatura universal, Barcelona, Danae, 1968.
- Soliloquio y coloquio: notas sobre lírica y teatro, Madrid, Gredos, 1968.
- Tratado de las melancolías españolas, Madrid, Sala, 1975.
- En torno a Azorín: obra selecta temática, Madrid, Espasa-Calpe, 1975.
- Estructura y sentido del Novecentismo Español, Madrid, Alianza Editorial, 1975.
- España en sus espejos, Barcelona, Plaza Janes, 1977.
- El combate por la luz, Madrid, Espasa Calpe, 1981.

=== Anthologies ===
- Antología mayor de la literatura española, Barcelona, Labor, 1958–1961.
- Tesoro breve de las letras hispánicas. Madrid, Emesa, 1968–1979.

=== Autobiographical writings ===
- Papers d´Identitat, Barcelona, Ediciones La Espiga, 1959.
- Memoria de una generación destruida, Barcelona, Delos Aymá, 1966.
- Retrato de un escritor, Barcelona, Pomaire, 1978.

== Sources ==
- J. Gerardo Manrique de Lara, Guillermo Díaz-Plaja, Madrid: Ministerio de Cultura, 1982.
- Juan Bautista Bertrán, «Guillermo Díaz-Plaja, poeta», en Poesía en treinta años 1941-1971 (1972), pp. 9–51.
- José Cruset, Guillermo Díaz-Plaja, Madrid, Epesa, 1970.
- Dámaso Santos, Conversaciones con Guillermo Díaz-Plaja, Madrid, Ed. Magisterio Español, 1972.
