= Generation of '98 =

Spanish cultural movement

The Generation of '98 (Spanish: Generación del 98) was a group of novelists, poets, essayists, and philosophers active in Spain at the time of the Spanish–American War (1898), committed to cultural and aesthetic renewal, and associated with modernismo.

The name was coined by José Martínez Ruiz (commonly known as "Azorín") in his 1913 essays titled "La generación de 1898", alluding to the moral, political, and social crisis in Spain produced by the loss of the colonies of Cuba, Puerto Rico, the Philippines, and Guam after defeat in the Spanish–American War that same year. Historian Raymond Carr defines the Generation of '98 as the "group of creative writers who were born in the seventies, whose major works fall in the two decades after 1898".

The intellectuals included in this group are known for their criticism of the Spanish literary and educational establishments, which they saw as having characteristics of conformism, ignorance, and a lack of any true spirit. Their criticism was coupled with and heavily connected to the group's dislike for the Restoration movement that was occurring in Spanish government.

== Historical context ==
The group that has become known as The Generation of '98 was affected by several major events and trends in Spanish history. According to Carr's definition of the group, most of them were born in the 1870s. These men were especially informed by Spain's defeat and humiliation in the Spanish–American War in 1898, which crystallized into two distinct political movements, Republicanism and Carlist Monarchism, marked by the oscillation of power (a zeal for reform characterized these years of Spanish history):

1. "The Glorious Revolution" in 1868 and the following six years of revolution, in which the country overthrew Queen Isabella and the monarchy and then had to try to fill the political void with a stable government.
2. The First Spanish Republic of 1873 lasted only 22 months.
3. The Restoration project of Antonio Cánovas del Castillo, was an attempt to create a constitutional monarchy based on Victorian Britain, which began shortly after Cánovas was appointed prime minister by Alfonso XII in 1874. A system called turno pacífico ("peaceful alternation") was devised in which two political parties alternated control of the government, by means of a heavily orchestrated and controlled electoral process. The Restoration was reasonably successful in restoring political stability, but finally ended with the Second Spanish Republic in 1931.

=== The restoration project ===
The first intellectual criticism took place at the dawn of the Restoration movement. In 1875, the minister for development, Manuel Orovio (1817–1883), sought to reinforce traditional "Spanish values" such as the dogma of contemporary Spanish Catholicism by an edict known as the Decreto Orovio.

=== Academic repression ===
This "crackdown" was a response to various attempts, notably but not exclusively by the intellectual elite listed below, to introduce some form of liberal democracy both in Spanish academic life and in the wider society.

Several progressive professors were dismissed from the Central University of Madrid for promoting the ideas of Karl Christian Friedrich Krause (1781–1832), a German philosopher who advocated Krausism.

=== La Institución Libre de Enseñanza ===
In 1876, these dismissed professors, led by Francisco Giner de los Ríos, founded the Institución Libre de Enseñanza (ILE), or The Free Educational Institution, a secular private educational institution that started with university-level instruction and later extended its activities to primary and secondary education.

Their work constituted an indirect repudiation of the official instruction of the time, which they had found ineffective, insufficient, and subject to suffocating control by political and religious interests. The Institution departed from this norm by stressing the importance of intellectual freedom and moral self-improvement.

== A movement of criticism and ideals ==
The Generation of '98 intellectuals objected to the meticulously organized structure of the Restoration system of government and the corruption that it fostered. After Spain's bloody and decisive defeat in the Spanish–American War, which resulted in thousands of dead Spaniards and the loss of all of Spain's remaining colonies in the Americas and the Pacific, these writers were prompted to voice their criticism. They agreed on the urgency of finding a means, in areas of thought and activity separate from politics, of rescuing Spain from its catatonic state.

The writers, poets and playwrights of this generation maintained a strong intellectual unity, opposed the Restoration of the monarchy in Spain, revived Spanish literary myths, and broke with classical schemes of literary genres. They brought back traditional and lost words and always alluded to the old kingdom of Castile, with many supporting the idea of Spanish Regionalism.

Often, literature produced by these writers conveyed themes of nostalgia for the past glory of Spain, especially its traditions and landscape. Conversely, they also present criticisms of the sociopolitical situation during that era, drawing conclusions about factors that caused the decline of Spain. As such, common characteristics of these works involved a minimalistic writing style, employing third person narration and a heavy dependence on dialogue instead of descriptions to advance the narrative. Many writers also experimented with new forms of genres, as Miguel de Unamuno did in conceptualizing the nivola.

Most texts in this literary era were produced in the years immediately after 1910 and are generally marked by the justification of radicalism and rebellion. Examples of this are the last poems incorporated to "Campos de Castilla", of Antonio Machado; Miguel de Unamuno's articles written during the First World War or in the essayistic texts of Pío Baroja.

The criticism of the "Generation of '98" today from modern intellectuals is that the group was characterized by an increase of egoism, and by a great feeling of frustration with Spanish society and politics.

== Key figures ==
Some of the key intellectual minds of the Generation of '98 include:

- Joaquín Costa
- Ángel Ganivet
- Miguel de Unamuno
- Ramón del Valle-Inclán
- José Martínez Ruiz (Azorín)
- Pío Baroja
- Antonio Machado
- Manuel Machado
- Ramiro de Maeztu
- Consuelo Álvarez Pool
- Manuel B. Cossio

== Sources ==
- Carr, Raymond (1966). Spain, 1808–1939.
- A History of Spain by Simon Barton
- Literary Criticism in the Essays of the Generation of 1898 by Mary E. Buffum
- El espacio urbano en la narrativa del Madrid de la Edad de Plata (1900–1938) by Cristián H. Ricci
