= Carmen Baroja =

Spanish writer and ethnologist

Carmen Baroja

Carmen Baroja Nessi (1883, Pamplona – 4 June 1950, Madrid) was a Spanish writer and ethnologist who wrote under the pseudonym Vera Alzate. She was the sister of the writers Ricardo Baroja and Pío Baroja, and mother of the anthropologist Julio Caro Baroja and film director Pío Caro Baroja.

== Early life ==
Baroja was the youngest child of Serafin Baroja, a Basque writer and poet who made his living as a mining engineer, and Carmen Nessi y Goñia, a woman of Basque and Italian descent. At the time of her birth, her father was editing Bai, Juana, Bai, the first (Basque-Castilian) bilingual periodical to be published in Pamplona. When it closed down after six issues, her father went back to his profession as a mining engineer and took the family to Burjassot near València, Cestona in Guipúzcoa, and San Sebastián.

In 1894, her family moved to Madrid to help her aunt, Juana Nessi, in her bakery, Viena Capellanes, after the death of her husband, Matías Lacasa. Her early education was at Catholic girls' schools, with private lessons in French and music. Thanks to her father's love for theatre and music she regularly attended concerts and theatrical productions. At this time, both her brothers were gaining prominence on the cultural scene, with Ricardo becoming recognized as a painter and Pío having his first literary works published. Through them, she came into contact with artists, writers and intellectuals who were shaping the new cultural world of Spain.

In 1902, she contracted typhoid fever and her brother Pío recommended that she go to the Monastery of El Paular in the Sierra de Guadarrama. After fully recovering, she returned to Madrid and despite her mother's opposition, she began to work with metals and enamels. In 1906, she went to London and Paris with Pío and studied art at the student residence of Jacqueline Paulhan, whose husband was the aviator Louis Paulhan. When she returned to Madrid, she devoted herself entirely to her work as a goldsmith artisan making jewelry as well as a reputation for herself.

== Lyceum Club Femenino ==
In 1913, she married Rafael Caro Raggio, an editor with whom she shared artistic and intellectual interests. On 14 November 1914, her first son Julio was born, followed by Ricardo, Baroja and Pío. For next several years, she focused on her duties as a wife and mother. In 1917, her husband, Rafael, inaugurated his publishing house, Editorial Caro Raggio, which became a thriving business within three years.

In 1926, Baroja rejoined active public life by participating in the creation the Lyceum Club Femenino, a feminist cultural association seeking to defend women's social and moral equality, and have full integration in education and work. Made up of artists, doctors, lawyers, politicians, scientists and writers, its members included Clara Campoamor, Zenobia Camprubí, Elena Fortún, Victoria Kent, María Teresa León, Maria de Maeztu Whitney, Concha Méndez, Margarita Nelken, and Isabel Oyarzábal Smith.

Even though its lectures and talks were open only by invitation, the Lyceum was perceived to represent a threat to decent bourgeois society, challenging as it did the gendered boundaries of cultural activity. The reaction of Madrid's literary elite was varied; while writers such as Federico García Lorca, Rafael Alberti and Miguel de Unamuno presented lectures at the Lyceum. Others were less supportive, most notably Jacinto Benavente, whose description of the Lyceum members as '"tontas y locas"' (fools and madwomen) is now infamous.

Among their successful legal reforms was the changing of Civil Code 57 from "a husband must protect his wife and she must obey him" to "the husband and wife must mutually protect and consider each other" and the deletion of Penal Code 438, in which "a husband who kills his adulterous wife and lover shall be punished by banishment".

== Spanish Civil War ==
The early start of the Spanish Civil War caught everyone by surprise. Baroja was living with her children in Vera de Bidasoa while her husband stayed on in Madrid working at his printing press, "spending a long, cruel summer of three years observing intransigence, stupidity and cruelty, irrespective of ideologies." His publishing house was destroyed during a bombing raid, and he had to return to his old job at the post office. Rafael died in 1943, a broken man.

== Afterward ==
After the war, the building that had housed the Lyceum Club Femenino was appropriated by the Falange, their records burned, and the group disbanded, with most members going abroad or into exile. Throughout the war, the building had been left intact, not even a teaspoon missing.

In 1947, Baroja bought a house on a 57-acre (23 ha) olive grove in Tendilla known as El Parador del Tío Ruperto in the province of Guadalajara. She was excited about her house and land and enjoyed the simple pleasures like sitting under the walnut trees on a peaceful afternoon. After a few years, she began to get ill and after two operations, Baroja died of intestinal cancer on 4 June 1950. Of her four children, only Julio and her youngest, Pío, survived. Her other two children, Ricardo and Baroja, had died. Her manuscript, Recuerdo de una mujer de la generación del 98 (Memories of a Woman of the Generation of '98), an autobiography about the lives of men and women she knew, was edited by Amparo Hurtado Díaz and published for the first time in December 1998, putting an end to the silence and near invisibility of an intelligent and talented woman.

In Pamplona, a street, Calle Carmen Baroja Nessi, is named after her.

== Writings ==
- El encaje en España (1933; Lace in Spain)
- Martinito el de la casa grande (1942; Martinito of the Big House)
- Joyas populares y amuletos mágicos (1945; Popular Jewels and Magical Amulets)
- Tres Barojas: poemas (1995; Three Barojas: Poems)
- Recuerdo de una mujer de la generación del 98, (1998; Memories of a Woman of the Generation of 1898)
