= José Martínez Ruiz =

Spanish novelist & essayist (1873–1967)

Azorín
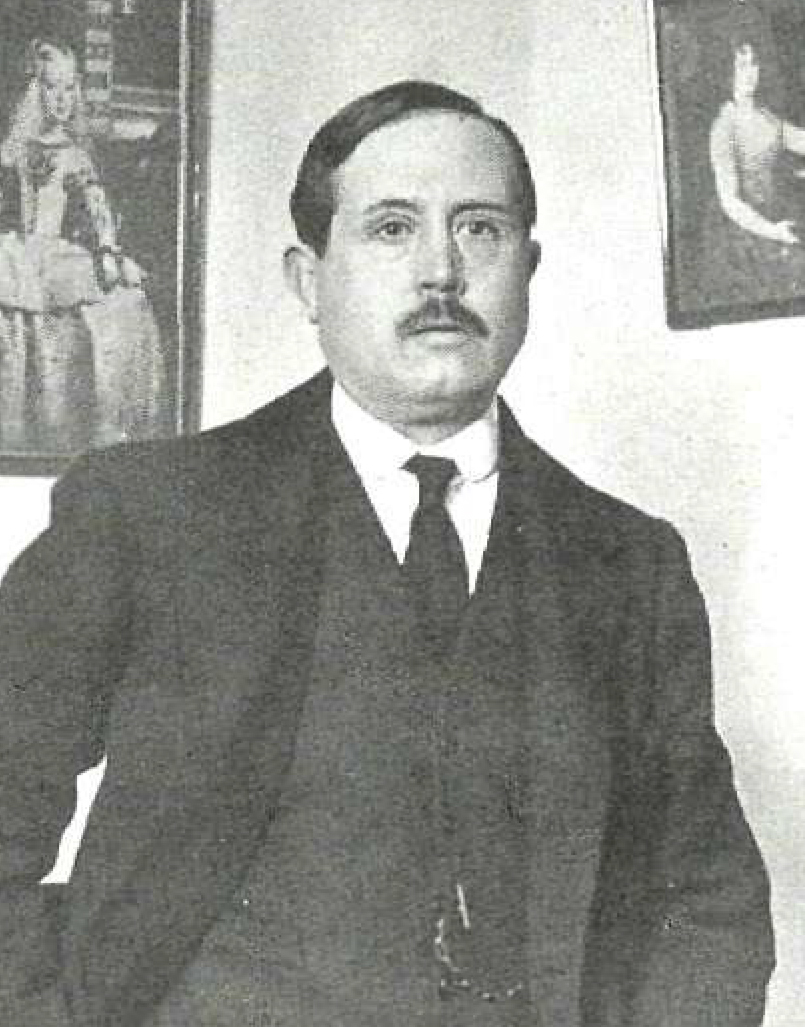
- Azorín in 1914
- Born: José Augusto Trinidad Martínez Ruiz; 8 June 1873; Monòver, Alicante, Kingdom of Spain
- Died: 6 March 1967 (aged 93); Madrid, Spanish State
- Occupations: Novelist; essayist; literary critic
- Years active: 1895–1967

Seat P of the Real Academia Española
- In office 26 October 1924 – 6 March 1967
- Preceded by: Juan Navarro-Reverter
- Succeeded by: Guillermo Díaz-Plaja

José Augusto Trinidad Martínez Ruiz (8 June 1873 – 2 March 1967), better known by his pseudonym Azorín (Spanish pronunciation: [aθoˈɾin]), was a Spanish novelist, essayist and literary critic.

== Biography ==
José Martínez Ruiz was born in the village of Monòver, in the province of Alicante, on 8 June 1873.

The creation of the Second Spanish Republic saw him re-adopt his old progressive political ideals. He abandoned the conservative ABC newspaper to write for the republican newspapers El Sol, La Libertad and Ahora. He edited Revista de Occidente, founded by José Ortega y Gasset, a journal promoting European philosophy, from 1923 to 1936.

When he returned to Spain after the Spanish Civil War, he found himself in "inner exile", along with other intellectuals who had not overtly supported the Franco regime during the conflict. He was at first denied a press identification card (tarjeta de periodista), but was supported by Ramón Serrano Suñer, at that time Franco's Interior Minister and president of the Falange. Accepting Franco’s regime was the price he had to pay in order to be admitted back, and he aligned with the dictatorship in a noted article in the right-wing journal Vértice.

In his old age, Azorín became a film enthusiast, writing numerous articles, some of which are reprinted in El cine y el momento, and claiming that "Cinema is the greatest form of art". He died in Madrid, Spain on 2 March 1967, at the age of 93.

== Honors ==
- 1917, Hijo Predilecto de Monòver.
- 1924, Elected to the Royal Spanish Academy
- 1946, Grand Cross of the Order of Isabella the Catholic
- 1956, Grand Cross of the Civil Order of Alfonso X, the Wise.
- 1969, His home in Monòver established as a museum, Casa-Museo Azorín

== See also ==
- List of essayists
- List of Spanish writers
- List of Spanish-language authors
