= Ignacio Pinazo Camarlench =

Spanish painter (1849-1916)

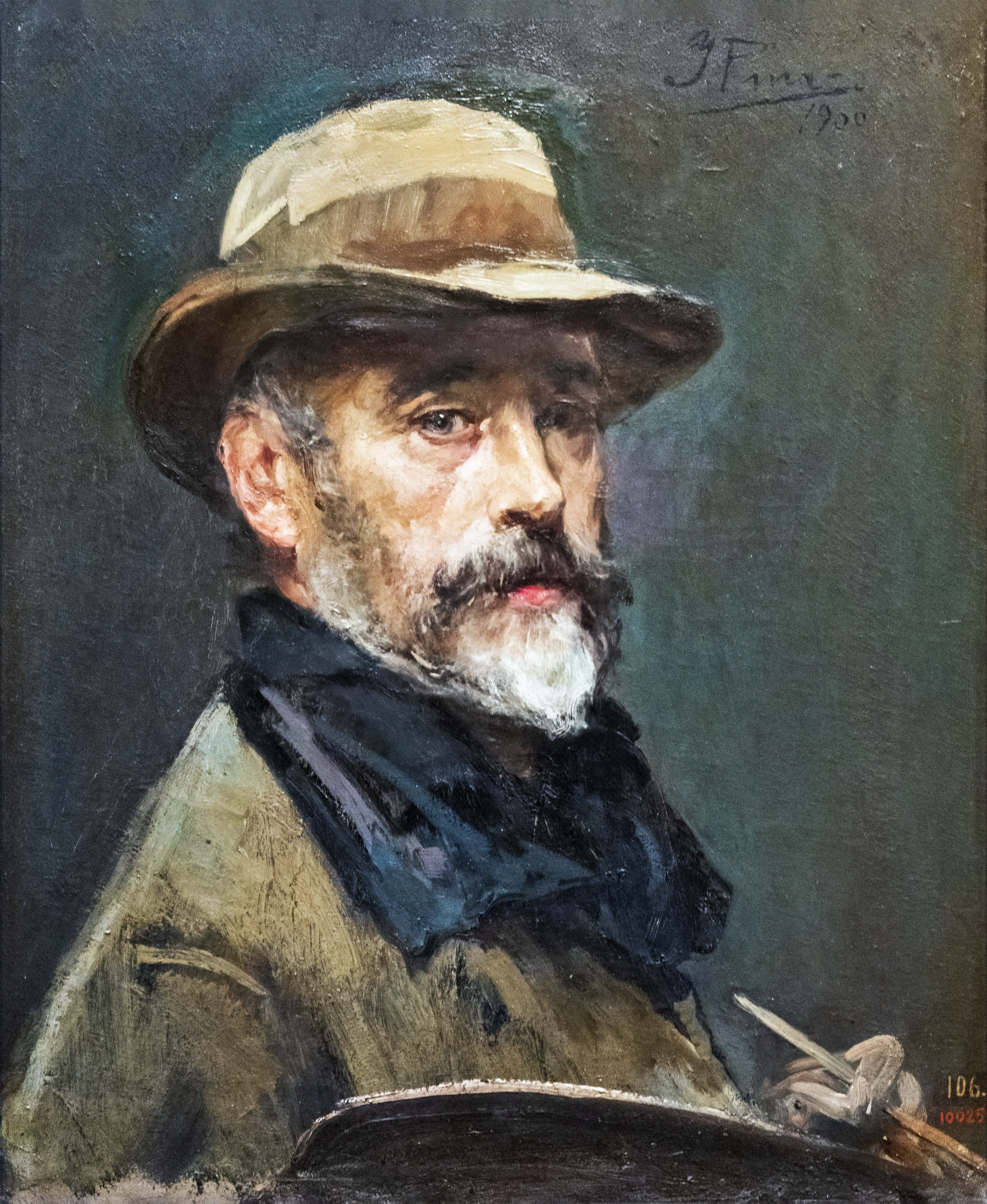
- Self-portrait (1900) MNAC
- Born: Ignacio Pinazo Camarlench; January 11, 1849; València, Spain
- Died: October 18, 1916 (aged 67); Godella, Spain
- Known for: Painting
- Movement: Romantic

Ignacio Pinazo Camarlench (January 11, 1849 – October 18, 1916) was a Spanish painter from Valencia. He was one of the most prominent Impressionist painters from late nineteenth century Spain.

== Biography ==
Born into a poor family in Valencia, Pinazo was forced from a young age to assist in supporting the family by practising various trades. He had only attended eight grades when his mother died of the cholera, and young Ignazio was variously employed as a silversmith, a painter of tiles, and a decorator of fans. After his father's death, he lived with his grandparents, and in 1864 enrolled in the San Carlos Academy of Fine Arts, Valencia, earning his living as a hatter.

His artistic career started when he was 21, and he achieved his first success in Barcelona three years later. In 1871, work by him was displayed in the National Exhibition of Fine Arts for the first time.

In 1873 the sale of a painting provided sufficient funds for him to visit Rome for the first time. When he returned to his native city in 1874, he abandoned the conventional historic themes he had so far devoted his efforts to, and instead started painting family subjects, nude figures, and scenes from daily life, thereby anticipating Joaquín Sorolla y Bastida and Francisco Domingo both in subject and style. This is the beginning of a more intimate, Impressionist style.

He returned to Rome in 1876, having obtained a grant from the Diputación de València, this time staying for five years.

In 1884, due to a cholera epidemic in Valencia, Pinazo temporarily moved to the town of Bétera, where he stayed in the villa "Maria" of the banker Jose Jaumandreu. From 1884 to 1886 he taught at the School of Valencia. He received many commissions from the Valencian aristocracy, among them the Marchioness of Benicarló.

The annual art exhibitions brought Pinazo silver medals in 1881 and 1885, and gold medals in 1887 and 1899. He also received a royal medal and in 1912 a street in Valencia was named after him.

He was married to Teresa Martinez Montfort. They had two sons, Ignacio and Jose, both of whom became painters themselves. He died in Godella, aged 67.

== Work ==
Ignazio Pinazo worked with dark colours: black, brown and other earth-like shades, as well as in the scintillating palette typical of Impressionism. His work often shows rapid brush strokes. Paintings include:

- Las hijas del Cid (1879)
- Los últimos momentos del rey Don Jaime el Conquistador en el acto de entregar su espada a su hijo Don Pedro
- El guardavía (1877)
- Barca en la playa (1890).

Part of his work can be seen in the Basilica de la asunción in the town of Cieza, and in the Museu de Belles Arts de València (Valencia Museum of Fine Arts). The largest collection of this painter's work is held at the Institut Valencià d'Art Modern (Valencia Institute of Modern Art), with over one hundred paintings and six hundred drawings, although unfortunately these are not on permanent display. A selection of his work may also be viewed at the Museo del Prado in Madrid.

== Selected paintings ==
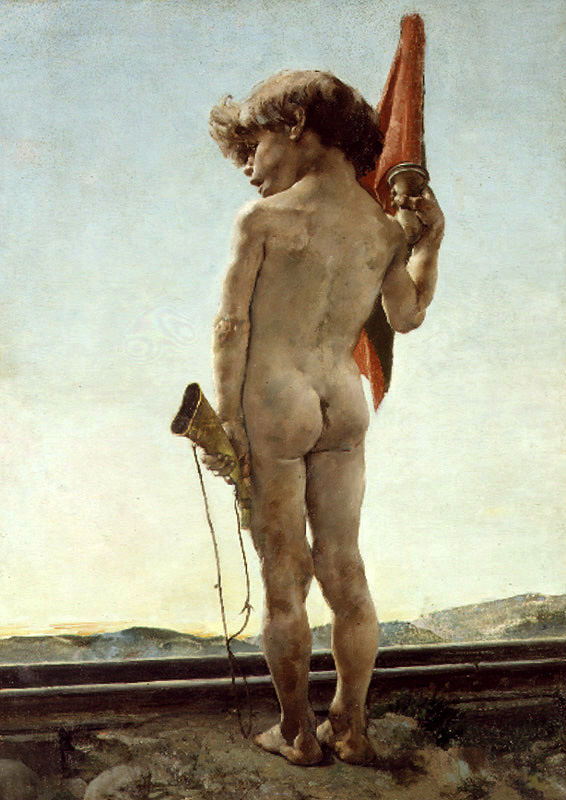
The Lineman

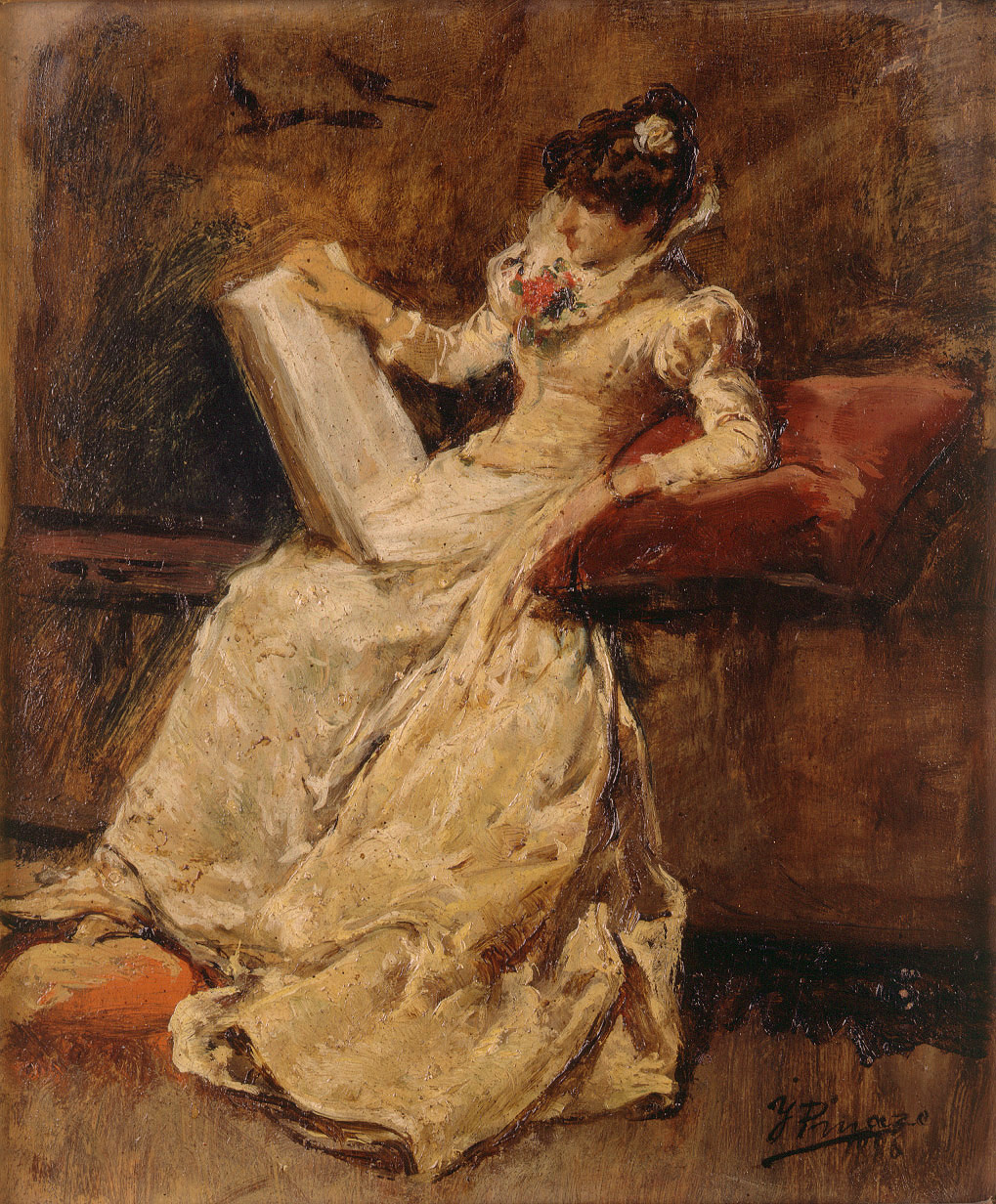
Seated Feminine Figure

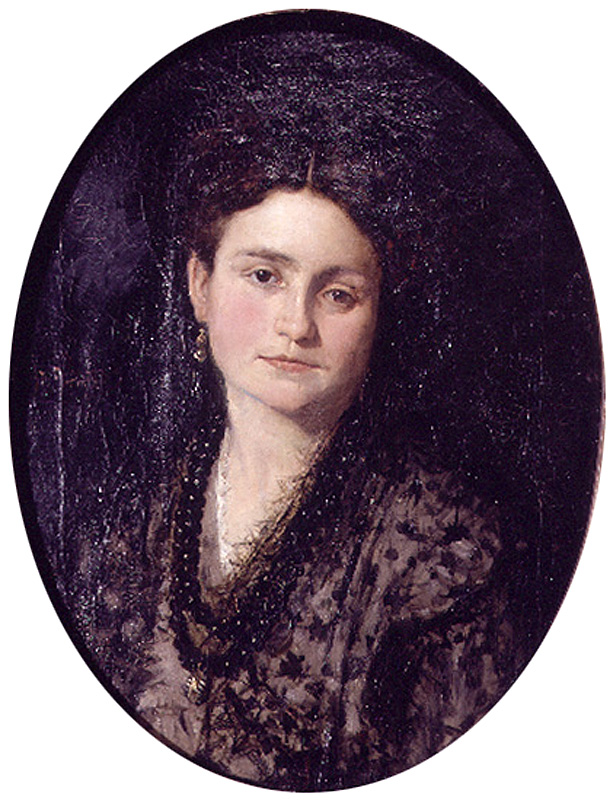
Portrait of Doña Teresa Martínez

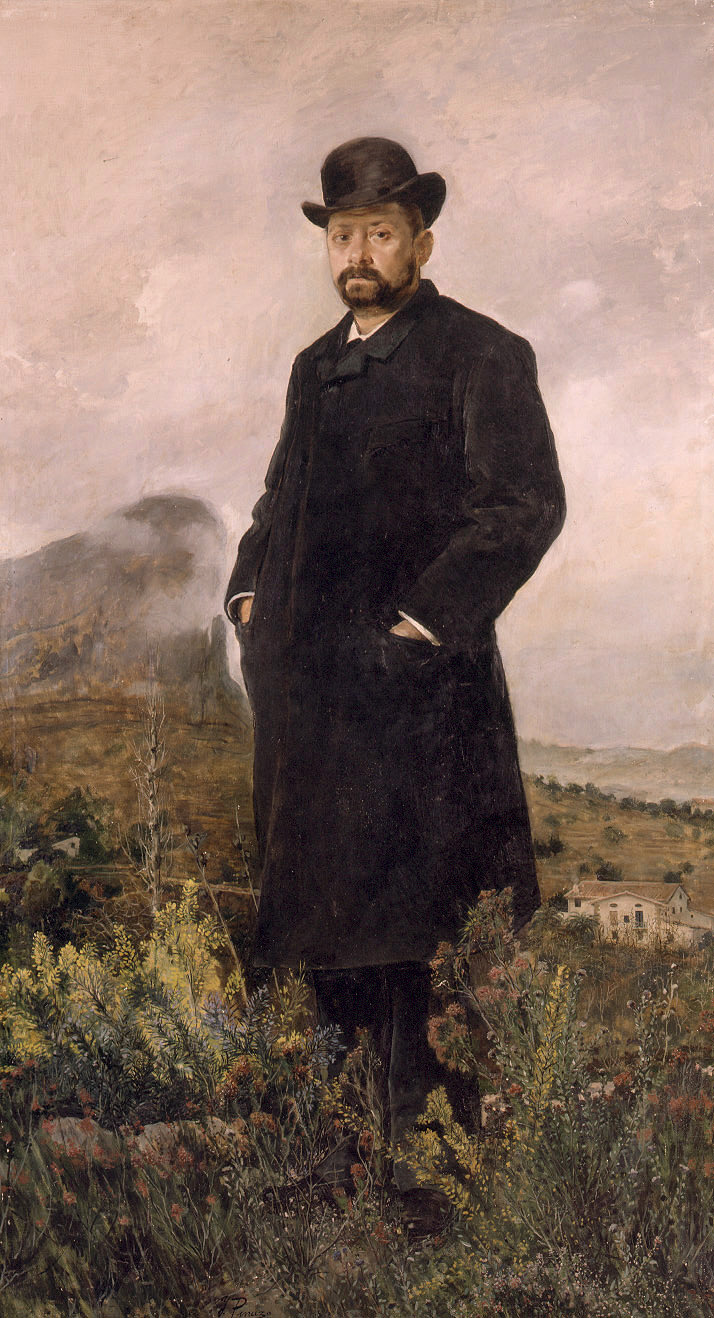
Portrait of Don Manuel Comas

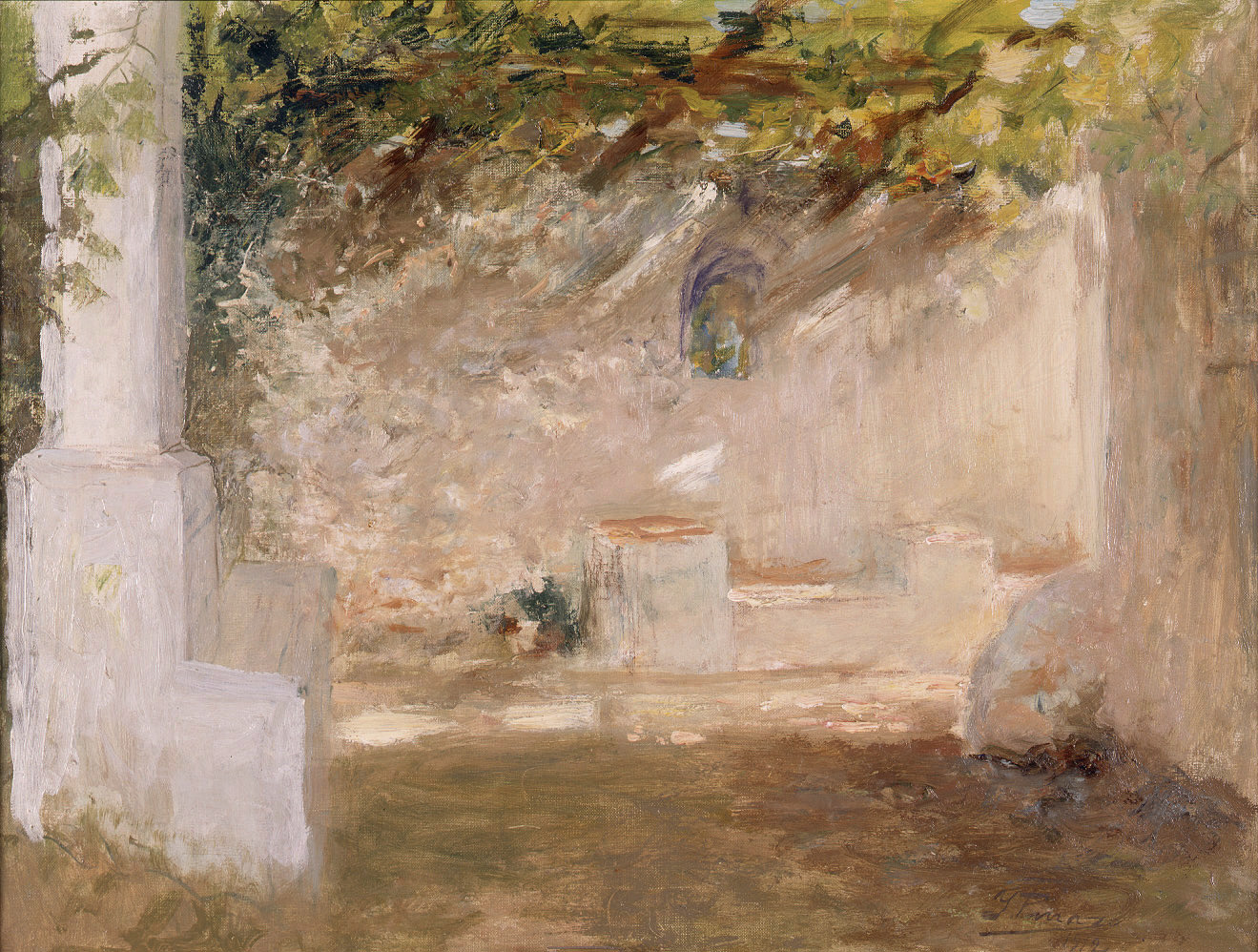
The Arbor

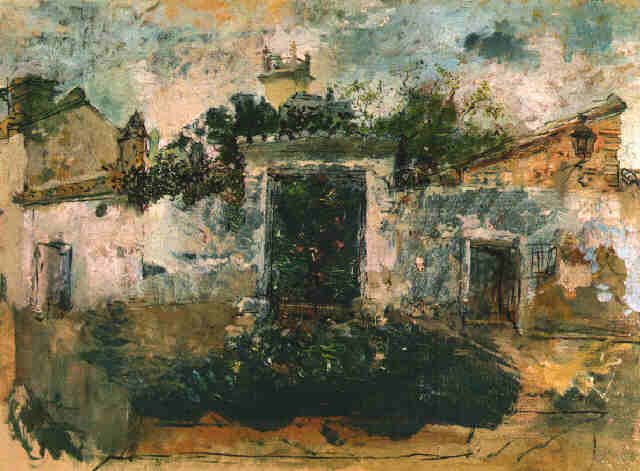
My Street in Godella

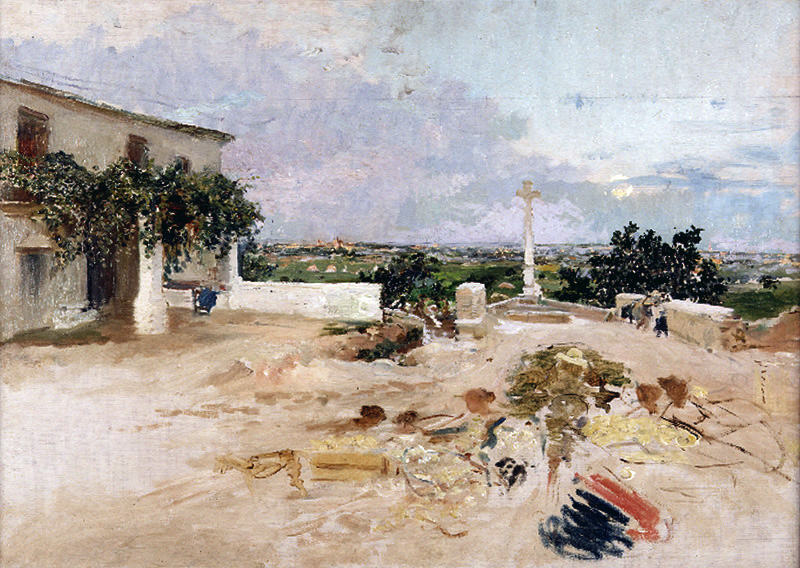
The Cross at the Mill in Godella

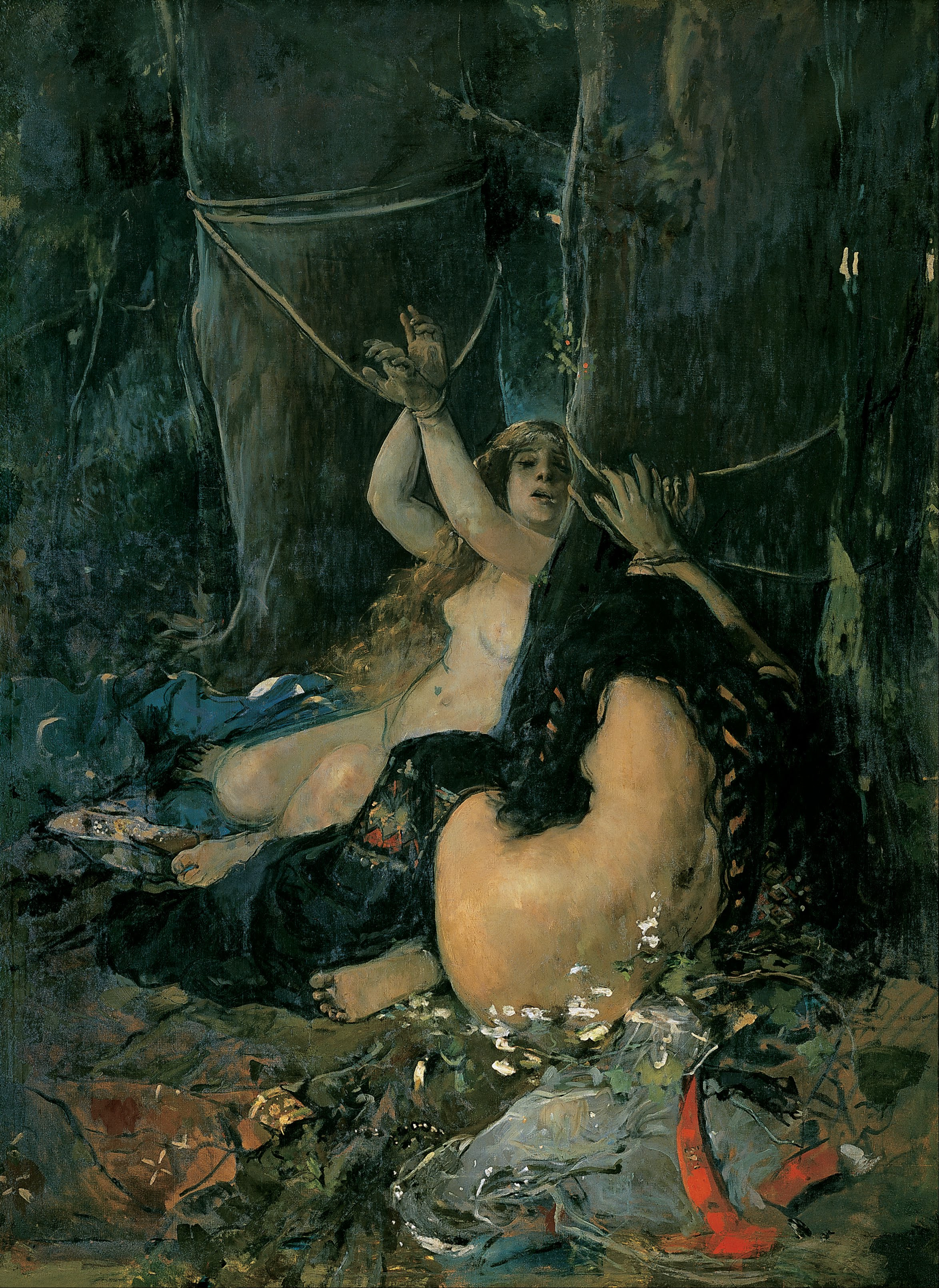
The Daughters of El Cid

Anochecer en la escollera III

== Sources ==
- Artehistoria: Ignacio Pinazo Camarlench
- Ignacio Pinazo, El Precursor de la Pintura Moderna, Javier Pérez Rojas, Universitat de València
