= Julio Caro Baroja =

Spanish academic

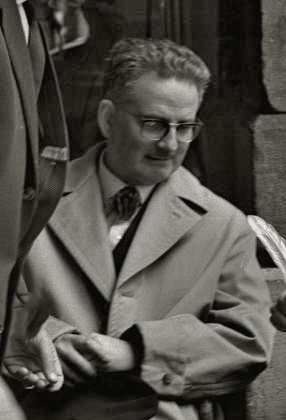
- Caro Baroja in 1965
- Born: 13 November 1914; Madrid, Spain
- Died: 18 August 1995 (aged 80); Bera (Navarre), Spain
- Occupations: Anthropologist, historian and author

Seat P of the Real Academia Española
- In office 15 June 1986 – 18 August 1995
- Preceded by: Guillermo Díaz-Plaja
- Succeeded by: Ángel González Muñiz

Julio Caro Baroja (13 November 1914 – 18 August 1995) was a Spanish anthropologist, historian, linguist and essayist. He was known for his special interest in Basque culture, Basque history and Basque society. Of Basque ancestry, he was the nephew of the renowned writer Pio Baroja and his brother, painter, writer and engraver Ricardo Baroja. He is buried in the family plot of the cemetery of Bera, Navarre, near their home, Itzea.

== Biography ==
Julio was the eldest son of editor Rafael Caro Raggio, who founded the publishing house Editorial Caro Raggio Madrid in 1917. His mother was Carmen Baroja, a Spanish writer and ethnologist who wrote under the pseudonym Vera Alzate.

As a child, he moved to the Navarrese town of Bera, where he spent much time with his uncle Pio Baroja. Pio took great interest and had a very important influence on his education. His early schooling was at the Instituto-Escuela de Madrid from 1921–1931. Later, he was attending the University of Madrid when the Spanish Civil War broke out. Taken by surprise, he returned to Bera. His father remained in Madrid and lost his printing press when his publishing headquarters were destroyed during a bombing raid.

After the war, he returned to Madrid to complete his studies receiving a PhD (summa cum laude) in Ancient History. He worked as an assistant in the Ancient History and Dialectology departments until he became Director of the Museo del Pueblo Español (1942–1953). In 1947, Baroja was elected corresponding member of the Royal Academy of the Basque Language and the Real Academia de las Buenas Letras of Barcelona. In 1951, he received a grant from the Wenner-Gren Foundation for Anthropological Research to carry out ethnological research in the United States.

From 1952 to 1957, he was in charge of an official Spanish exploration mission in the Spanish Sahara. He later said, "I have strange images of what I have done.... There are things which I have done in a moment of total change, such as when I went to the Sahara and wrote a book about the nomads... but I get the feeling that it was not even me that wrote it."

Having grown up in an isolated community where people still believed in magic and witchcraft, he became interested in the magical arts. Before he was 20, he had spoken to elderly people who were convinced that there were "men and women who could change themselves into animals, fly, and do other things. He read numerous books, among them, the works of Pierre de Lancre. His interest, which had waned during the Spanish Civil War was renewed during a trip to London. He bought several more books and blending his earlier and later findings, he brought a more modern view of people in relation to the world around them.

In his book, The World of the Witches (1961), he believed that the witch's world, like any other social group, changes considerably from one generation to the next. He explained that this book tied social history in with anthropology.

In 1952, the British Council placed him in charge of the guidance of graduates who were to study Anthropology at the University of Oxford. He also taught ethnology at the University of Coimbra in Portugal. In 1961, he was Director of Studies of Social and Economic History at the Ecole Pratique des Hautes Etudes in Paris. In 1983, was a recipient of the Prince of Asturias Awards, and in 1989, he was awarded the Menéndez Pelayo International Prize for his research efforts in the field of Spanish ethnology.

== Legacy ==
He is remembered throughout Spain. The Plaza Julio Caro Baroja in San Sebastian and I.E.S. Julio Caro Baroja schools located in Fuenlabrada, near Madrid; Getxo, Bilbao; Málaga, Andalusia and Pamplona, Navarre, are tributes to his many accomplishments and contributions to the fields of anthropology and history.

== Bibliography ==
- Ortiz García, Carmen (2018). "Vie et œuvre de Julio Caro Baroja". In Christine Laurière, Frederico Delgado Rosa (ed.). Dans le labyrinthe de l'anthropologie et de l'histoire. BEROSE - International Encyclopaedia of the Histories of Anthropology. Paris.
