= Pío Baroja =

Spanish writer (1872–1956)

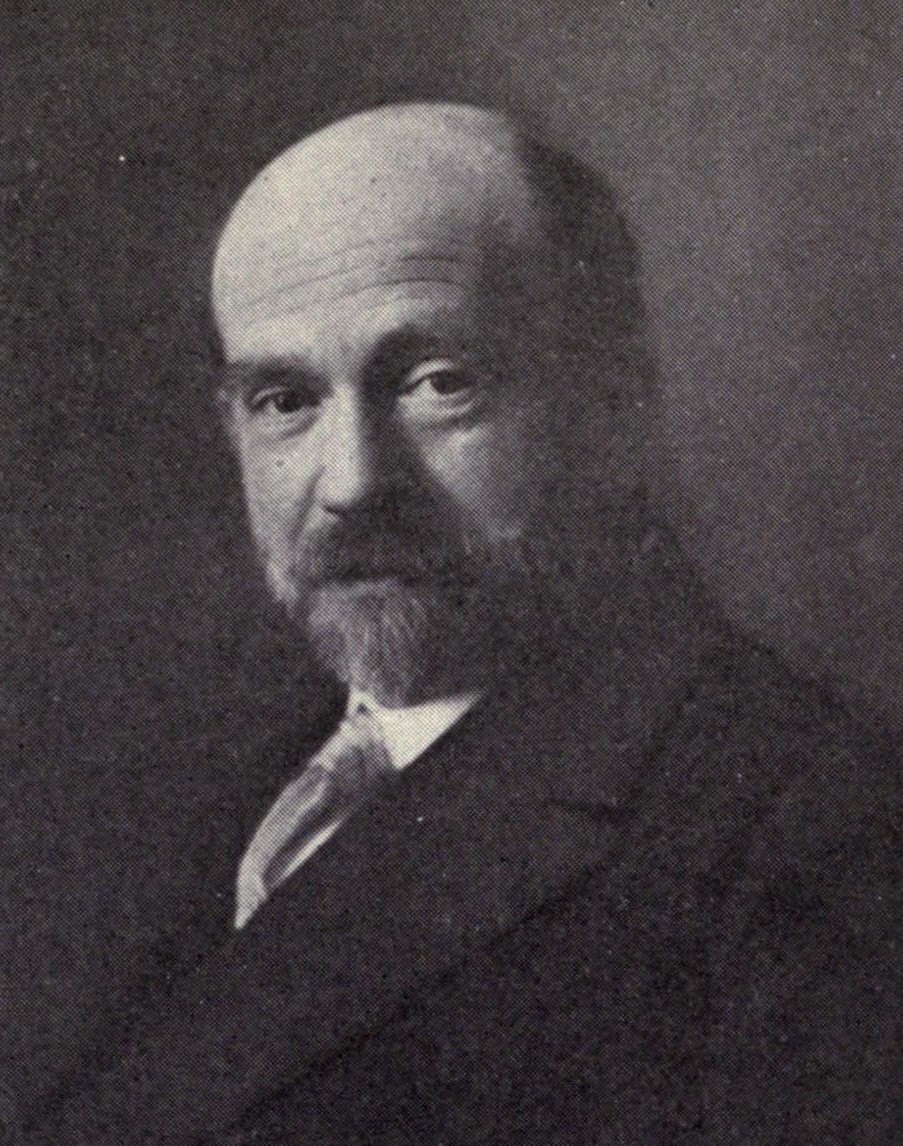
- Born: Pío Baroja y Nessi; 28 December 1872; San Sebastián, Spain
- Died: 30 October 1956 (aged 83); Madrid, Spain
- Resting place: Madrid, Spain
- Occupations: Author; novelist; biographer; physician
- Relatives: Serafin Baroja (father); Carmen Nessi y Goñi (mother)
- Writing career
- Literary movement: Generation of '98

Seat a of the Real Academia Española
- In office 12 May 1935 – 30 October 1956
- Preceded by: Leopoldo Cano
- Succeeded by: Juan Antonio de Zunzunegui

Pío Baroja y Nessi (28 December 1872 – 30 October 1956) was a Spanish writer, one of the key novelists of the Generation of '98. He was a member of an illustrious family. His brother Ricardo was a painter, writer and engraver, and his nephew Julio Caro Baroja, son of his younger sister Carmen who was a goldsmith, was a well-known anthropologist.

== Biography ==
Pío was born in San Sebastián, Guipuzcoa, the son of Serafin Baroja, also a noted writer and opera librettist.

The young Baroja studied medicine at University of Valencia and received a doctorate at the Complutense University in Madrid at 21. Although educated as a physician, Baroja practiced only briefly in the Basque town of Cestona. His memories of student life became the raw material for his novel The Tree of Knowledge. He also managed the family bakery for a short time, running unsuccessfully on two occasions for a seat at the Cortes Generales (the Spanish parliament) as a Radical Republican. Baroja's true calling, however, was always writing, which he began seriously at the age of 13.

Baroja's first novel, La casa de Aizgorri (The House of Aizgorri, 1900), is part of a trilogy called Tierra vasca (Basque Land, 1900–1909). This trilogy also includes El mayorazgo de Labraz (The Lord of Labraz, 1903), which became one of his most popular novels in Spain. During this period, he also published Camino de perfección (Road to Perfection, 1902), which is part of the so-called Novels of 1902. This group of texts is considered a milestone in the renewal of Spanish novels, particularly, a turning point in the transition between realism and modernism.

Baroja is best known internationally for another trilogy, La lucha por la vida (The Struggle for Life, 1922–1924), which offers a vivid depiction of life in Madrid's slums. John Dos Passos greatly admired these works and wrote about them.

Another major work, Memorias de un hombre de acción (Memories of a Man of Action, 1913–1931), offers a depiction of one of his ancestors who lived in the Basque region during the Carlist uprising in the 19th century.

One of Baroja's tetralogies is called La mar (The Sea) and comprises Las inquietudes de Shanti Andía (1911), El laberinto de las sirenas (1923), Los pilotos de altura (1929) and La estrella del capitán Chimista (1930). Baroja also wrote the biography of Juan Van Halen, a Spanish military adventurer.

Baroja's masterpiece is considered to be El árbol de la ciencia (1911) (translated as The Tree of Knowledge), a pessimistic Bildungsroman that depicts the futility of the pursuit of knowledge and of life in general. The title is symbolic: the more the chief protagonist, Andres Hurtado, learns about and experiences life, the more pessimistic he feels and the more futile his life seems.

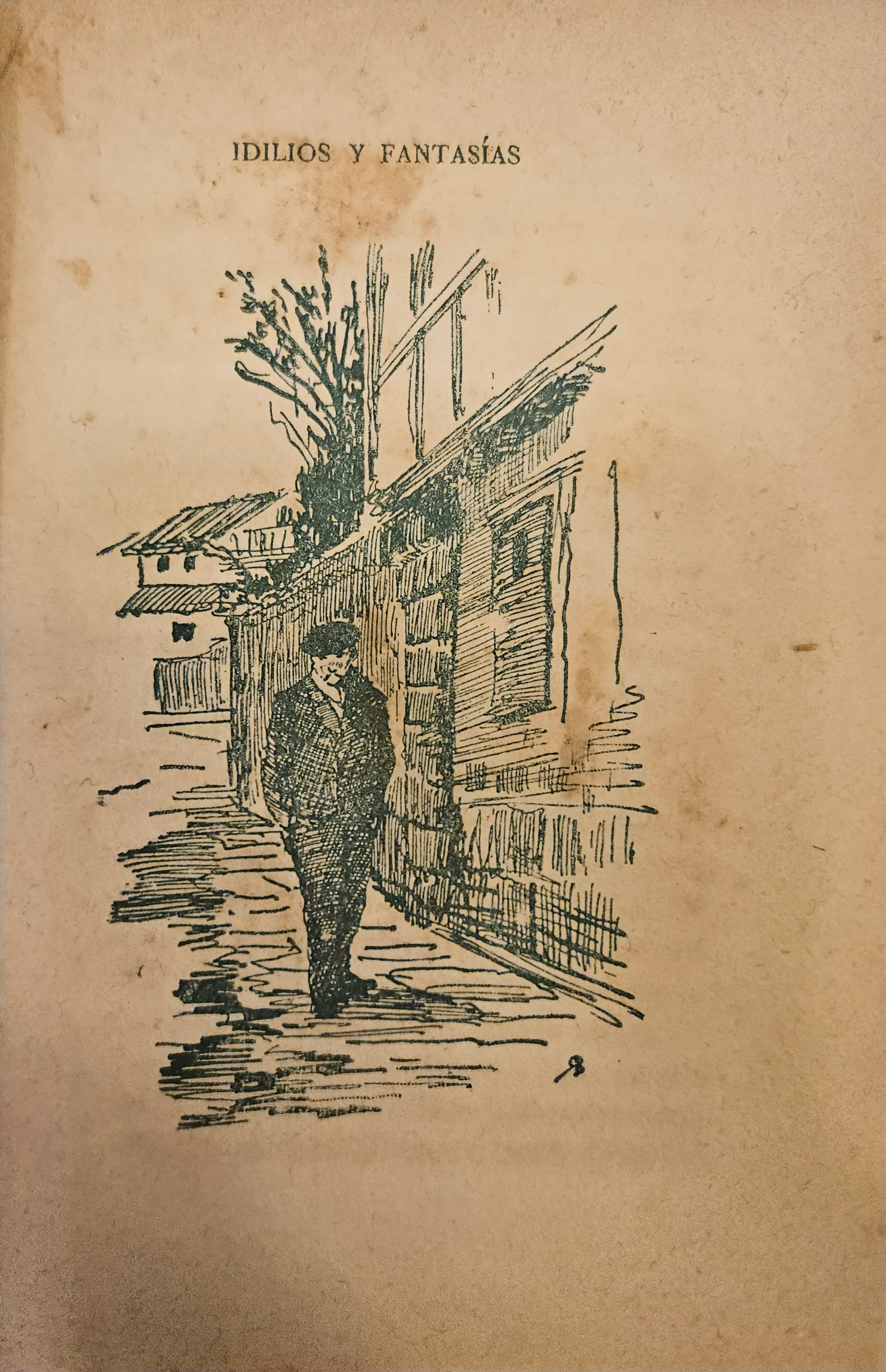
Pio Baroja's Idilios y fantasias were illustrated by his brother Ricardo

In keeping with Spanish literary tradition, Baroja often wrote in a pessimistic, picaresque style. His deft portrayal of the characters and settings brought the Basque region to life much as Benito Pérez Galdós's works offered an insight into Madrid. Baroja's works were often lively but could be lacking in plot. They are written in an abrupt, vivid, yet impersonal style. He was accused of grammatical errors, which he never denied.

While young, Baroja believed loosely in anarchism, like others in the '98 Generation. He later admired men of action, similar to Nietzsche's superman. Catholics and traditionalists denounced him, and his life was at risk during the Spanish Civil War (1936–1939). In Youth And Egolatry (1917), Baroja described his beliefs as follows:

I have always been a liberal radical, an individualist and an anarchist. In the first place, I am an enemy of the Church; in the second place, I am an enemy of the State. When these great powers are in conflict I am a partisan of the State as against the Church, but on the day of the State's triumph, I shall become an enemy of the State. If I had lived during the French Revolution, I should have been an internationalist of the school of Anacharsis Cloots; during the struggle for liberty, I should have been one of the Carbonieri.

Ernest Hemingway was greatly influenced by Baroja and told him when he visited him in October 1956, "Allow me to pay this small tribute to you who taught so much to those of us who wanted to be writers when we were young. I deplore the fact that you have not yet received a Nobel Prize, especially when it was given to so many who deserved it less, like me, who am only an adventurer."

Baroja died shortly after this visit on 30 October and was buried in the Old Civil Cemetery of Madrid.

An Iberia Airbus A340-642, EC-JPU (in service between 2006 and 2020) was named after him.

=== Baroja and Catalonia ===
Pío Baroja had a markedly opposed attitude both to Catalanism and to the existence of the Catalan language. As example, a fragment of an article in La Conquista del Estado can be mentioned:

...the question of the predominance of the language – Catalan — must be resolved over time... But the State has not exerted pressure here, and if it has, it has not been as energetic as it has in France, Germany and England, with their regional languages...

There are other examples of anti-Catalanism, in which it even goes so far as to describe Catalans as Jews, at a historical moment when this was considered a serious racial insult.

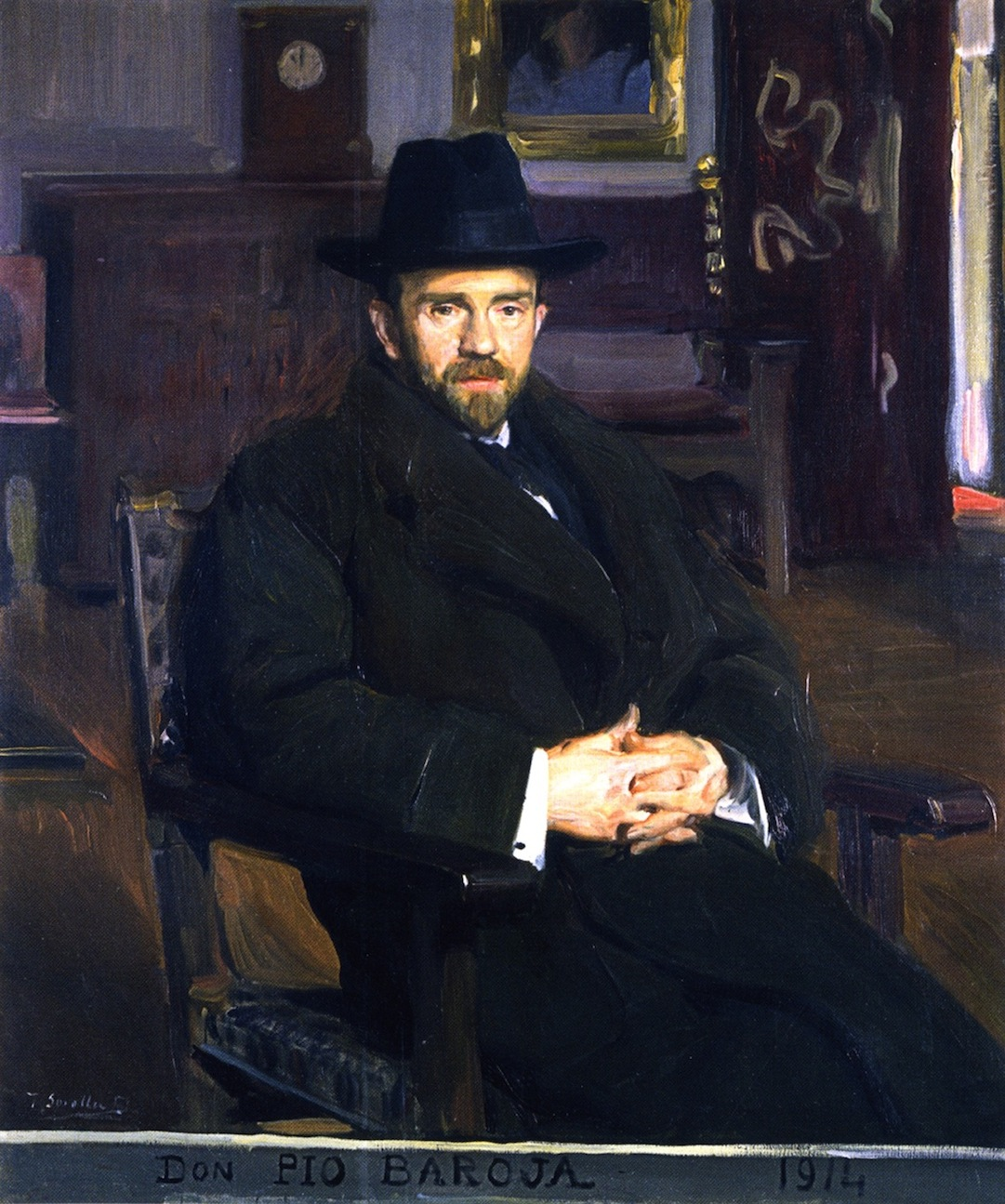
Portrait by Joaquin Sorolla (1914)

== Works available in English ==
- The City of the Discreet (1917). A.A. Knopf
- The Quest (1922) A.A. Knopf
- Weeds (1923). A.A. Knopf
- Red Dawn (1924). A.A. Knopf
- The Lord of Labraz (1926). A.A. Knopf
- The Restlessness of Shanti Andía, and other writings (1959). University of Michigan Press
- The Tree of Knowledge (1974). Howard Fertig: ISBN 0-86527-316-2
- Caesar or Nothing (1976). Howard Fertig: ISBN 0-86527-224-7
- Zalacain the Adventurer (1998). Lost Coast Press: ISBN 1-882897-13-7
- Youth And Egolatry (2004). Kessinger Publishing: ISBN 1-4191-9540-9
- Road to Perfection (2008). Oxbow Books: ISBN 978-0-85668-791-4 (pbk.)

== See also ==
- Joan Tartas
- Miguel de Unamuno

== Sources ==
- BookRags
