= Bera, Navarre =

Bera
- Municipality
- (in Basque) Bera; (in Spanish)Vera de Bidasoa
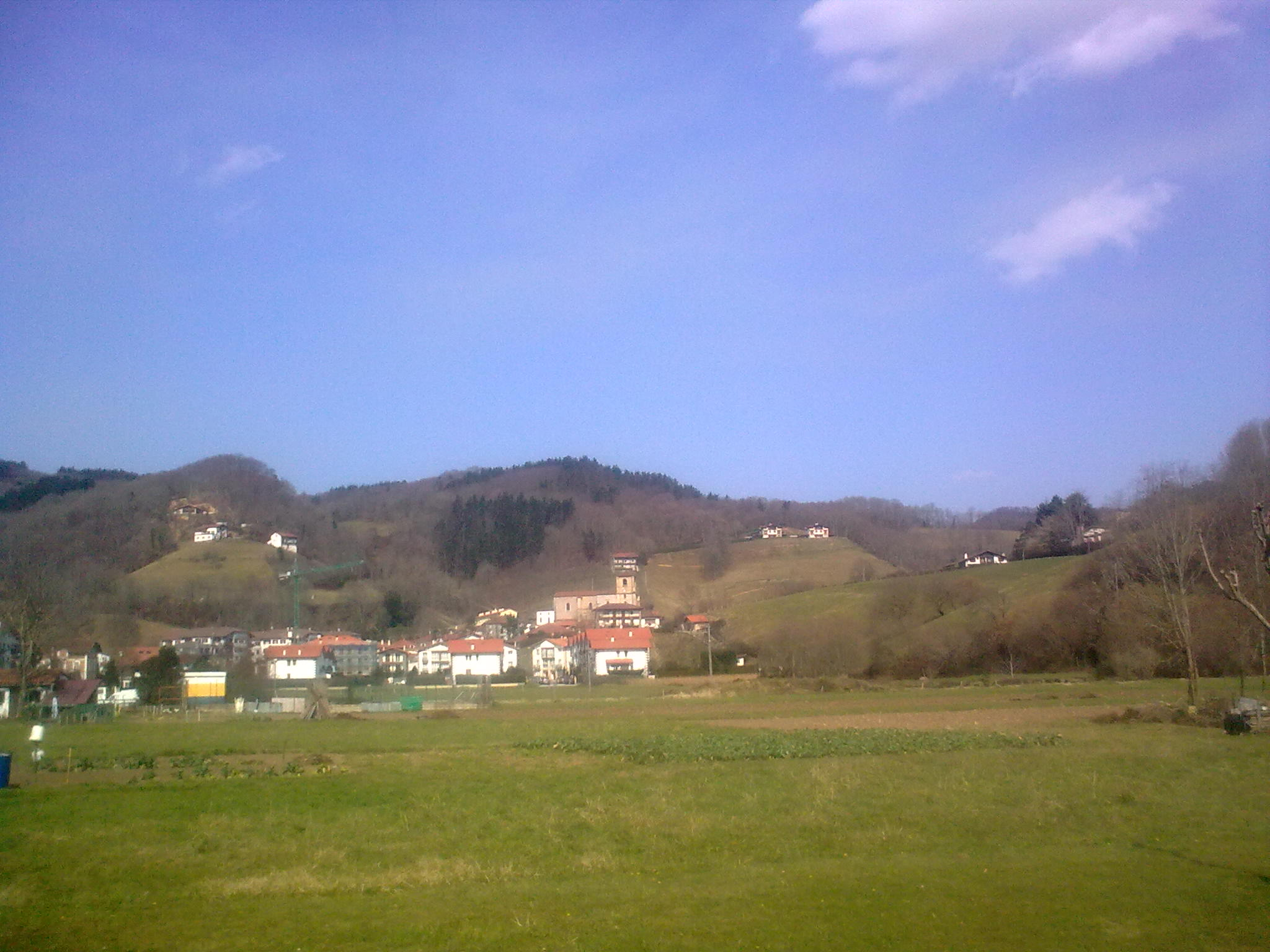
- Bera seen from its south side

- Flag Coat of arms

- Location of Bera within Navarre
- Coordinates: 43°16′50″N 1°40′55″W
- Country: Spain
- Autonomous community: Navarre
- Province: Navarre
- Comarca: Bortziriak
- Founded: 1403

Government
  - Mayor: Josu Iratzoki Agirre (EH Bildu)

Area
  - Total: 35.60 km^{2} (13.75 sq mi)
- Elevation: 56 m (184 ft)

Population (2025-01-01)
  - Total: 3,779
  - Density: 106.2/km^{2} (274.9/sq mi)
- Demonym(s): Basque: beratarra Spanish: beratarra
- Time zone: UTC+1 (CET)
  - Summer (DST): UTC+2 (CEST)
- Postal code: 31780
- Website: Official website

Bera is a town and municipality situated in the province and autonomous community of Navarre, in northern Spain. The town is traversed by the river Bidasoa before it enters Gipuzkoa at Endarlatsa, eventually flowing into the Cantabrian Sea (Bay of Biscay) between the towns of Hendaye and Hondarribia.
