= List of magazines in Spain =

Magazines in Spain are varied and numerous, but they have small circulation. In terms of frequency, the Spanish magazines are mostly weekly and monthly. Although there are news magazines and political magazines in the country, they mostly focus on entertainment, social events, sports, and television.

There were many influential feminist magazines in the eighteenth and nineteenth centuries in the country. The first magazine of which the editor-in-chief was a woman was El Robespierre Español which was in circulation in between 1811 and 1812. The number of mainstream women's magazines intensified in the 1960s. As of 2014 there were also a large number of aviation magazines in the country.

At least thirteen magazines were published by the Falange-operated publishing companies in 1948. The data by the General Media Survey indicated that there were 137 magazines in Spain in 2003. By the beginning of 2005 the number had risen to 576. In addition, there were a total of 19 supplements. However, between 2008 and 2012 a total of 182 magazines ceased publication in Spain.

The following is an incomplete list of current and defunct magazines published in Spain. They may be published in Spanish or in other languages.

== 0–9 ==
- 391

== A ==
- Academia
- Actualidad Económica
- Alternativas Económicas
- La Ametralladora
- Andaina
- The Andalucian
- Apartamento
- Arquitecturas Bis
- Automovil
- Autopista

== B ==
- Barcelona Cómica
- Barcelona Metròpolis
- Barrabás
- BCN Week
- El Be Negre
- Bética
- Blanco y Negro
- Buen Humor
- Butifarra

== C ==
- Cairo
- La Calle
- Cambio 16
- La Campana de Gràcia
- Casa & Campo
- Casa Viva
- El Cascabel
- Cavall Fort
- Cervantes
- El Ciervo
- Cinemanía
- La Codorniz
- Confidentiel
- La Conquista del Estado
- CORREDOR\
- El Croquis
- Consigna
- Cuadernos para el Diálogo
- Cuore

== D ==
- Los Deportes
- Desnivel
- Diez Minutos
- La Directa
- Doblón
- Don Balón

== E ==
- El Ecologista
- Emprendedores
- En Patufet
- Época
- Erreakzioareaccion
- La España moderna
- L'Esquella de la Torratxa
- Estudios
- Estudis Romànics
- European Vibe Magazine

== F ==
- Film Ideal
- Forbes Spain
- Fotogramas

== G ==
- La Gaceta Literaria
- Garbo
- Gigantes del Basket
- Goldberg Magazine
- Grecia
- Gutiérrez

== H ==
- Hairstyles
- Hala Madrid
- Hermano Lobo
- Historia National Geographic
- Hobby Consolas
- ¡Hola!
- Hora de España

== I ==
- Ibérica
- La Ilustración Española y Americana
- Iniciales
- Ínsula
- Interviu
- Intramuros
- Inversión de Finanzas

== J ==
- Jakin
- Jaque
- Jot Down
- El Jueves

== K ==
- Kiss Comix
- Kovalski Fly

== L ==
- Labores del Hogar
- La Lectura
- Lecturas
- Libertad
- La Luz del Porvenir
- Luz y unión
- Laus Hispaniae. Revista de historia de España

== M ==
- Los Madriles
- Manera
- Mata Ratos
- Medina
- Meridià
- Mi Casa
- Micromanía
- Mirlo
- Mister K
- Mondo Sonoro
- Mongolia
- El Mono Azul
- Mortadelo
- Motociclismo
- Mundo Hispánico
- El Museo Universal
- Música Nueva
- Muy Interesante

== N ==
- Nova Ibèria
- Lo Noy de la mare
- Nuestro Cine
- Nuestro Cinema
- Nuestro Tiempo
- Nueva Cultura
- Nueva Revista
- Nuevo Estilo
- Nuevo Mundo
- Números Rojos

== O ==
- Objetivo
- Octubre
- Orto

== P ==
- El Papus
- Pèl & Ploma
- Pensat i Fet
- Politica Exterior
- Popular 1 Magazine
- Por Favor
- Primer Acto
- Primer Plano
- Prometeo
- Pronto
- El Propagador de la libertad
- Pulgarcito

== Q ==
- Quo
- Quad & Jet (magazine)

== R ==
- La Revista Blanca
- Revista Contemporánea
- Revista Geográfica Española
- Revista de Girona
- Revista de Libros
- Revista de Occidente
- Rockdelux
- Ronda Iberia

== S ==
- Semana
- Signos Magazine
- SP
- Stendek

== T ==
- Tapas
- Tele Indiscreta
- Telva
- Teresa
- El Temps
- Tiempo
- La Traca
- El Triangle
- Todoterreno Magazine 4x4
- Tribuna
- Trinca (comic)
- Triumph
- Triunfo

== U ==
- Unión Libre

== V ==
- Vértice
- El Vibora
- Vindicación Feminista
- La Violeta
- La Violeta de oro
- V.O.
- Virolet
- Vivir en el Campo
- Vogue Spain

== Z ==
- Zero

== See also ==
- Media of Spain
- List of newspapers in Spain
- History of the press in Spain
