= Stendec (disambiguation) =

STENDEC was the final word of the last Morse code transmission received from the Star Dust airliner before it crashed in the Andes in 1947.

Stendec or Stendek may also refer to:

- Stendek (magazine), a 1970s Spanish UFO magazine
- Stendek (musician), American musician
- Stendec (band), an electronica music duo
- Stendeck, a Swiss musician
