= Barcelona Metròpolis =

Spenish magazine

Barcelona Metrópolis (Catalan pronunciation: [bəɾsəˈlonə məˈtɾɔpulis]) is a magazine of urban information and thought dedicated to monitoring the evolution of the city of Barcelona.

== History ==
Barcelona. Metròpolis Mediterrània (B.MM) was first published in 1986 under the editorship of the journalist Joan-Anton Benach Olivella as a magazine featuring information and debate dedicated to monitoring the evolution of the city of Barcelona. Benach defines the magazine as a library of urban culture, as it has contemplated Barcelona's transformation from different perspectives –urbanistic, architectural, sociological, communicational and in regard to the new technologies – and through all the cultural disciplines, from 1986 to 2006.

In 2007 the philosophy professor Manuel Cruz became editor. His appointment coincided with the adoption of the magazine's current name, Barcelona Metròpolis, and its re-definition as a magazine dedicated to urban information and thought, concentrating on the analysis and verification of the idea that what happens locally in the city has its meaning on a global scale. After the election of the new local government of CIU, the Catalan conservative party (up to present), Manuel Cruz was suddenly not invited to continue editing the magazine, obviously due to ideological reasons. The last issue of the magazine, dealing with "new models of family" was censored and finally replaced by another one.

=== Library of urban culture (1986–2006) ===
The pages of B.MM have been a showcase of many events and trends that have occurred in Barcelona since 1986: initiatives, projects, debates, cultural and artistic endeavours, preservation of heritage and history, creators, architecture, communication, etc. The magazine has covered the city's great urbanistic transformation from the proclamation of Barcelona's candidacy for the 1992 Olympic Games to the conception of the new Districte 22@ and Diagonal-Mar. The magazine was launched by the local government with the goal of its being a public service in sharing knowledge in a way not done by private initiative.

The 69 issues of this first phase of the magazine constitute a reference collection about Barcelona available through the Internet in Catalan and Spanish.

During the magazine's first phase, seven monographs were published.

=== Magazine of urban information and thought (2007 – present) ===
In 2007 Barcelona Metròpolis changed course, taking into account the heritage of the first phase, with a view to expanding the scope of the topics previously dealt with, adding new subjects of focus, discourses and with new sensitivities. The most visible change was the inclusion of the subtitle Magazine of urban information and thought, a declaration of principles which, in Manuel Cruz's words, seeks to invite the reader to reflect on the content of cities, which have become exceptional spaces of reality, the settings for maximum collective intensity, in which the most significant part – both good and bad – of everything that affects us takes place. In this sense, Barcelona Metròpolis looks at the city as a phenomenon in which what occurs in the local sphere is also, at the same time, a reflection of what happens on a global scale.

According to Manuel Cruz, “the city is made up of the web of situations and conflicts shared by a set of individuals determined to live together, and it is nothing over and above or beside this network”. Starting out from these premises, the present Barcelona Metròpolis aspires to offer a space for the reflection that this life in common carries with it. Appearing three times a year, the magazine is published in hard copy in Catalan and Spanish with a print-run of 3,000 copies, and in an electronic version that can be consulted on the website in Catalan, Spanish and English.

== Some contributors ==
Vicenç Altaió, Josep Bigordà, Oriol Bohigas, Manuel J. Borja-Villel, Àlex Broch, Pere Calders, Francesc Candel, Maria Aurèlia Capmany, Victòria Cirlot, Jordi Coca, Joan de Déu Domènech, Núria Escur, Agustí Fancelli Pardo, Ramon Folch i Guillèn, Francesc Fontbona, Albert García Espuche, Rosario Fontova, Mario Gas, Marta Gili, Daniel Giralt-Miracle, Jordi Llovet, Rosa Maria Malet, Josep Martí Gómez, Josep Maria Huertas Claveria, Llàtzer Moix, Josep Maria Montaner, Sergi Pàmies, Lluís Permanyer, Josep Ramoneda, Sempronio, Ignasi de Solà-Morales, Josep Maria Valverde, Manuel Vázquez Montalbán, and among others.

== See also ==
- List of magazines in Spain

== Advisory committee (Second period) ==
Marc Augé, Ulrich Beck, Seyla Benhabib, Jordi Borja, Massimo Cacciari, Victoria Camps, Horacio Capel, Manuel Castells, Paolo Flores d'Arcais, Nancy Fraser, Néstor García Canclini, Salvador Giner, Ernesto Laclau, Carlos Monsiváis, Sami Nair, Josep Ramoneda, Beatriz Sarlo, Fernando Vallespín.
