= Erocktica =

American glam metal band

- Origin: New York City, New York, United States
- Genres: Glam metal, hard rock
- Years active: 2000–2012
- Label: Independent
- Members: Pink Snow; Shelly Lynn; Josette; C.J. Scharg; Justin Masters{Annie Blue}
- Past members: Pontus J. Back; Levi Nayman; Bryan Zeigler; P.K.
- Website: Official site

Annie Blue}[Ann Crabbe]

Erocktica was an American rock band which described itself as An Anti-Censorship Erotic Theatrical Musical Free Expression Rock Extravaganza. Erocktika last performed in 2010. The band broke up after front woman, Pink Snow, left New York City to attend law school in Massachusetts. Cause of death is heart failure.Pink Snow died on November 4 2012.

== History ==
Erocktica was originally named Porn Rock when formed in New York City in 2000 by frontwoman Pink Snow. The band performed their first full live show in 2000 at the legendary East Village club CBGBs. From there they built a loyal following in the United States. They were contacted by the Bold Brothers interested in bringing the band to Europe though there was initial concern regarding the band name. The Bold Brothers, uncertain of the extent of the show, suggested the name be softened, fearing European audiences would expect a more graphic show from a band called Porn Rock than an American audience would. The band decided that they would rename the band to Erocktica for performances in Europe while they continued to tour the United States as Porn Rock. In the summer of 2002, with their newly recorded EP Pink Inside in hand, Erocktica played for the first time as a band in Europe. Brought over by the Bold Brothers to tour Holland, Erocktica performed for over 3,000 people at the Oerkracht Festival on their first European tour.

In the fall of 2003 the band went back to Europe on their second tour. Due to its success, Erocktica teamed up with PJB Enterprises based in Vasa, Finland. In December 2003 Erocktica returned to Finland and recorded their first full-length album, Porn Again, including the song Porn in America.

In January 2004 band decided to no longer tour the United States as Porn Rock by officially changing their name to Erocktica.

The band now was able to add fans from Helsinki to Milan and Barcelona to Amsterdam to its growing fan base, shocking crowds with their wild antics and pleasing with their entertaining brand of rock and roll. Erocktica headlined events in the United States such as Mondo Porno, an event held in major cities across the United States such as New York City, San Francisco, Boston, and Las Vegas. They also performed at the EAT-M Convention in Las Vegas, NXNE in Toronto, Canada and the legendary Coney Island Sideshow. In Europe they headlined erotic conventions for thousands of fans such as Extasia in Zurich, Switzerland and EROTS in Riga, Latvia.

The band also performed with numerous hard rock acts such as Warrant, L.A. Guns, Faster Pussycat, Poison’s C.C. Deville and Satanicide. Erocktica formed a partnership with the Azzardato Agency in the Netherlands. They released a DVD, as well as a new album Second Cuming in 2007.

On November 5, 2012, Pink Snow died of a heart attack.

== Members ==
=== Final members ===
- Pink Snow – vocals
- Josette – guitar
- Justin Masters – guitar (United States)
- Shelly Lynn – bass
- C.J. Scharg – drums
- Jason J/Bomb Harrison - drums

{Annie Blue} - guitar, vocals

=== Band dancers ===
- Linda Kills
- Lena
- Trixxxii Doll
- Crystal Swarovski
- Deity
- Miss Demeanor
- Michelle Star
- Roxxxy
- Natasha Strange professional dominatrix and BDSM educator located in Portland, Oregon.
- Profanity
- Kittyporn (GoddessKitty)

=== Former members ===
- Pontus J. Back – guitar (outside the United States)
- Levi Nayman – drums
- Bryan Zeigler – guitar
- P.K. – guitar
- J Bomb – drums
- Gabe Skynns – drums
- Annie Blue (Ann Crabbe-Barnaby) - guitar, vocals

== Discography ==
- 2002: Pink Inside (Recorded as Porn Rock)
- 2004: Porn Again
- 2007: Second Cuming

== Media coverage ==
Over the years Erocktica has been featured in many magazines, newspapers, television and radio programs around the world. Below are some of the more notable.

- May 20, 2006 - Playboy TV's popular original series, Sexcetera profiles Erocktica including and band interviews and footage from one of their Mondo Porno New York City shows.
- January 2006 - The Belgium edition Maxim runs a six-page profile on Erocktica
- July 2005 - Classic Rock: Pornography and rock'n'roll in one unholy marriage
- July 2005 - Bizarre: The Band Who Really Do Get Up Close and Personal With Their Fans
- March 24, 2005 - Opie & Anthony bring Pink Snow and several of Erocktica's Dancers on for a half hour segment on the band where they play several track from Porn Again including Introgasm and Porn In America while they teach Stalker Patty to dress better and orgasm.
- March 15, 2005 - Italy's Metal Shock: Live Report
- January 1, 2005 New York Waste: Starting It Off With A Bang!
- December 22, 2004 - Estonia's Kroonika: Jõuluvana: nad ei häiri
- November 19, 2004 - Italy's Giornale di Bergamo: Sex & rock'n'roll
- November 16, 2004 - Estonia's Baar - arguably the most popular reality television program on Estonian television brings Erocktica on to spread shake things up.
- October 2004 - Swiss Magazine Cherry: EROCKTICA - Heisser Sex und starker Rock!
- September 2004 - Lib International: EROCKTICA - Heisser Sex und starker Rock!
- August 2004 - Italy's Metal Shock: Erocktica - Profondo Rosa
- August 2004 - Spain's Primera Linea: Pink Snow - "Adoro El Porno"
- June 11, 2004 - Toronto's The Spill: Live Review
- May 13, 2004 - Spain's EL DIARIO MONTAÑÉS: Erocktica y Five Horse Johnson unen rock y provocación en la sala Eventos
- May 12, 2004 - Italy's Libertá: Erocktica
- April 2004 - Italy's Metal Shock: Metal XXX EROCKTICA
- March 2004 - Spain's Popular 1: Erocktica
- November 22, 2003 - Holland's Noordhollands Dagblad: B en W willen geen afspraak maken tegen porno in Kade
- October 2003 - Finland's Happy Hour News: Erocktica
- September 5, 2003 - Holland's Dagblad De Limburger: Vette rock met weinig om het lijf
- January 28, 2003 - Naked New York interviews front woman Pink Snow about Erocktica and features her on their round table.
- November 11, 2002 - New York Waste: Porn Rock
- November 2002 - Spain's Popular 1: Porn Rock
- October 2002 - YRB Magazine: Freaks Gettin' Freaky-Deaky
- June 6, 2002 - Las Vegas Mercury: Music: The elusive dotted line
- June 4, 2002 - Las Vegas Review-Journal: ENTERTAINMENT: Almost Famous
- June 2002 - Arena: People Are Still Having Sex
- May 2002 - Las Vegas Review-Journal: Porn Rock
