= Intramuros (disambiguation) =

Intramuros is a historic walled district in Manila, Philippines.

Intramuros or Intra Muros may also refer to:

- Intramuros (journal), a literary review published in Spain
- The Walls of Hell, a 1964 Philippine-American motion picture also known as Intramuros
- Intra Muros, also published as My Dream of Heaven, a book by American writer Rebecca Ruter Springer
- Intra Muros, a 2017 play by Franco-British scriptwriter Alexis Michalik
