= K-Hito =

Spanish humourist and publisher (1890–1984)

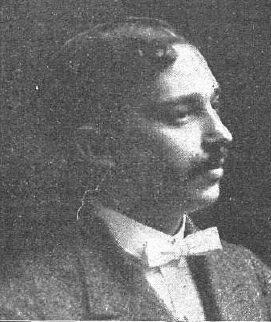
- Born: Ricardo García López; 1890 Villanueva del Arzobispo
- Died: 1984 (aged 93–94) Madrid
- Areas: Writer, caricaturist, film producer, magazine publisher

Ricardo García López (1890–1984), better known by his pseudonym K-Hito, was a Spanish humorist, caricaturist, bullfighting critic, film producer, and magazine publisher. Considered part of the Generation of '27, he was the founder and director of four magazines, in the pages of which he created several characters, such as Gutiérrez, Macaco, Currinche, and Don Turulato.

== Career ==
He was born in Villanueva del Arzobispo, Jaén Province in 1890, and grew up in Alicante. He began drawing at the age of four. At Alicante, he studied at the Parrilla academy and worked in a post office. In 1907, he moved to Valencia, where he began to collaborate in humor magazines and offered the first exposition of his work in 1912 in the Círculo de Bellas Artes.

He subsequently founded the magazine Gutiérrez, precursor to La Codorniz. He served as the editor of the children's magazines Macaco and Macaquete. Macaco, the name of both the title character and the magazine that featured it, was started in 1928. However, it folded and the Macaco comic strip was transferred to Macaquete. In the process of the transfer, Macaco was featured in a continuity strip rather than in a gag strip. He also contributed to Gracia y Justicia, a periodical critical of Azaña, President of the Second Spanish Republic. He also contributed to Le Journal, Pinocho, ABC, Blanco y Negro, El Debate, Ya, Informaciones, Ahora. He became famous through his caricatures in the newspaper known as El Debate.

With Joaquín Xaudaró and Antonio Got, he founded the Sociedad Española de Dibujos Animados (SEDA) in 1932. Most of the films produced by SEDA have been lost, although there exist some copies of the film "Falsa noticia de fútbol".

During the Spanish Civil War, he lived in Valencia, and worked there as a professor of calligraphy at the Academia Comercial Morales. He worked under his real name; using his pseudonym was dangerous, as he had published under it a number of articles lampooning the milicianos, or anti-fascist militias.

In 1940, he founded the weekly magazine Dígame, serving as its editor. Collaborating with him at Dígame and Gutiérrez were Enrique Jardiel Poncela, Edgar Neville, Miguel Mihura, José López Rubio and Tono (Antonio Lara de Gavilán). He also collaborated with Gabriel Miró.

K-Hito also worked as a bullfighting critic (as a boy he had wanted to be a bullfighter), and his work appeared in bullfighting chronicles (crónicas taurinas). He is credited with reconciling two bitter enemies, the bullfighters Manolete and Carlos Arruza, who at K-Hito's instigation, hugged one another in the cartoonist's natal town of Villanueva del Arzobispo.

En 1949, Villanueva del Arzobispo named him an Adoptive Son and named a street after him.

He died at Madrid.

== Filmography ==
He was writer and director for all the films below:

- Francisca, la mujer fatal (1934)
- En los pasillos del congreso (1932)
- Falsa noticia de fútbol (1932)
- El Rata primero (1932)
- La Vampiresa Morros de Fresa (1932)

== Books ==
- Carmen y Raphael (1940)
- “Manolete” ya se ha muerto
- Muerto está que yo lo vi (1947)
- Yo, García (una vida vulgar) (1948)
- ¡Hasta luego! (1950)
- Anda que te anda (1954)
- El álbum de K-Hito (1973)
