= José Caballero (painter) =

Spanish painter (1915–1991)

José Caballero (11 June 1915 – 26 May 1991) was a Spanish painter.

He was one of the most varied artists (in technique, style and theme). His way of understanding painting during the surrounding the civil war showed little similarities during the period.

== Career ==
At the end of the 1920s he met poet Adriano del Valle and in 1930, Daniel Vázquez Díaz, when he was painting frescoes in La Rábida monastery. He arrived in Madrid in 1931, but maintained his hometown ties, where that year he held his first individual exhibition in the Mercantile Circle.

In 1932, along with Federico García Lorca and others, he produced an exhibition of scandalous drawings in the Popular Ateneo that lasted for only one day. In 1933 Lorca invited him to La Barraca, where he created sets of drawings. He met Alberto Sánchez, Pablo Neruda, Rafael Alberti, Miguel Hernández, Maruja Mallo, Joaquín Torres García and Luis Buñuel. The latter introduced him to surrealism, showing him, for example, the collages of Max Ernst.

In 1935 Caballeros created three surrealist posters for his performance together with del Valle in the Ateneo of Sevilla and illustrated poems for Lorca and Neruda.

He contributed to magazines such as Cruz y Raya, Noreste, Línea, Caballo Verde para la poesía, (Green Horse for Poetry) etc. Less known was his participation in the first Drawing Fair (1935) of the Iberian Artist Society.

In 1937 he spent months at the battlefront producing drawings and maps. After the war he made surrealist illustrations filled with contents related to Catholicism in magazines such as Vértice or Santo y Seña convinced by Dionisio Ridruejo. In 1945 he participated in the III Salón de los Once (Eleven's Hall). Five years later, he was invited to the XXV edition of the Biennale Exhibition of Venice and held his first major individual exhibition in Madrid, in the Clan gallery.

However, neither of these tendencies continued, especially in the fifties, when he left the figurative arts and tried to unite geometric abstraction with the matter-like expressivity of informalism. The results varied but always represented his creative interests, who remained influential in the artistic environment of Madrid until his death.

He received Spain's National Award for Plastic Arts in 1984.

José Caballero's paintings are showcased at the Museo de Arte Contemporáneo in Madrid.
