= Martin J. Louis =

Spanish photographer and painter

Martin J. Louis (born José Luis Martín Frías; 1946 in Segovia, Spain) is a Spanish photographer and painter best known for his iconic shots of rock and roll legends such as Queen, David Bowie, Robert Plant, Lou Reed, Ozzy Osbourne and Pink Floyd.

He is also founder of Spanish Rock publication Popular 1 Magazine.
