= La Violeta de oro =

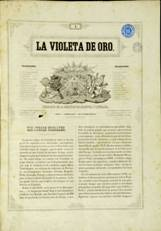
Front cover of La Violeta de oro

La Violeta de oro was a Catalan magazine that was first published in October 1851. The editor-in-chief was Víctor Balaguer. Behind the publication of the magazine was the "Sociedad Filarmónica Literaria" (a literary society), which had a very high prestige regarding music. After two months, Victor Balaguer had to leave the magazine. As a consequence, it disappeared on December 20, 1851, with only 9 issues published. Regarding the format of the magazine, it had 8 pages and a monthly subscription cost of 1 peseta. It was printed by "Imprenta del Porvenir" (Barcelona).

== Scope and collaborators ==
The objective of the magazine was to promote Catalan poetry and to fight for the restoration of the Floral Games. In fact, the first issue of La Violeta de oro contained an article about the Floral Games and its history. The society tried to renovate the games and it established prizes for poetry contests.

The collaborators of the magazine were men from the society (Víctor Balaguer, Josep Llausàs, Milà i Fontanals, Claudi Lorenzale, Ilas i Vidal, and Joan Mañé i Flaquer). In addition, there were other collaborators who were important literary leading figures from Barcelona and Madrid, such as Josepa Massanès, Antonio Cánovas del Castillo, Antonio Trueba, Eulogio Florentino Sanz, Joaquim Rubió i Ors, Antoni Fargas and Bonaventura Bassols.

== See also ==
- List of magazines in Spain
