= Joaquín Xaudaró =

Spanish cartoonist, illustratos and caricaturist

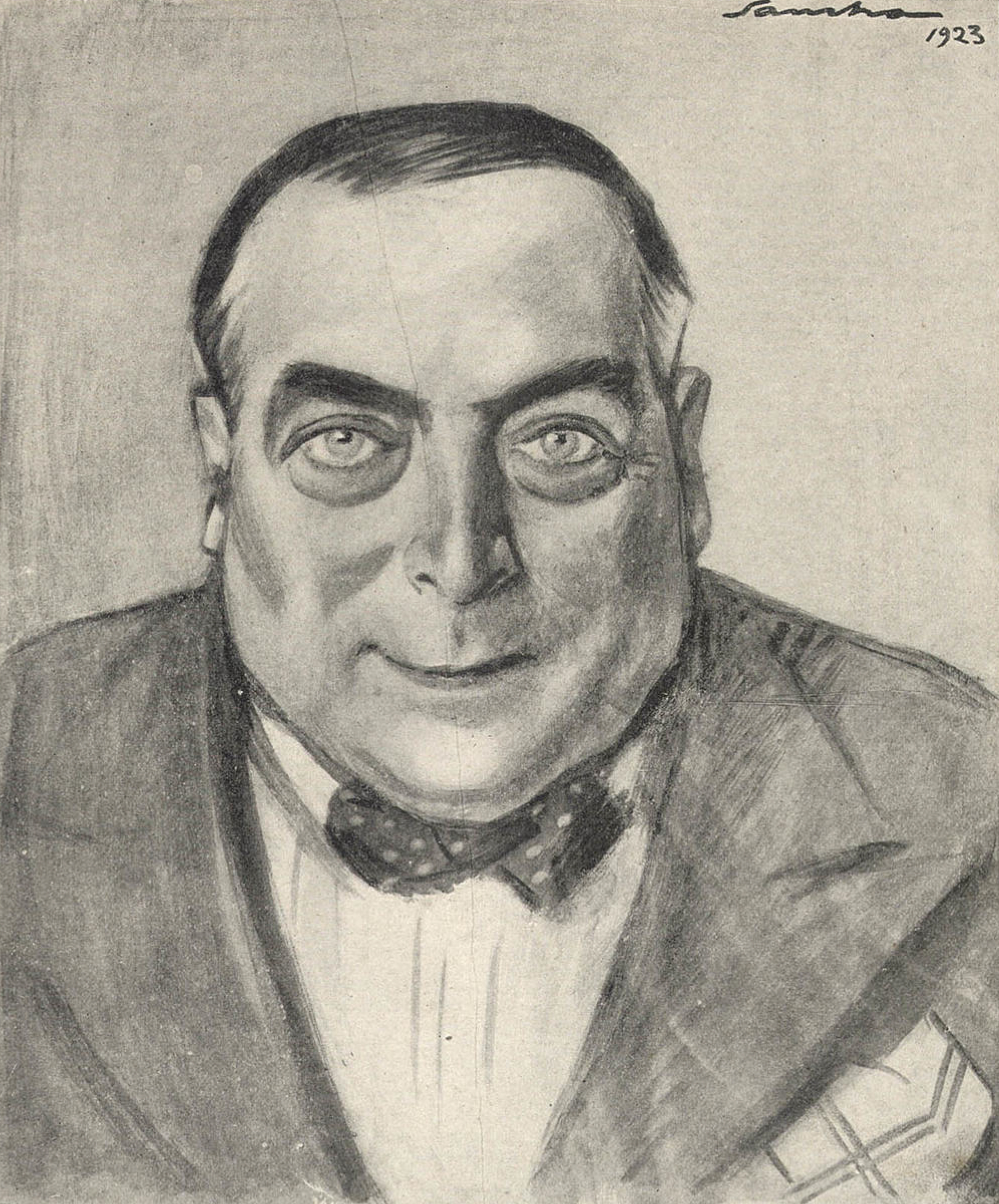
- Born: Joaquín Xaudaró y Echau; August 17, 1872 Vigan, Ilocos, Captaincy General of the Philippines, Spanish Empire
- Died: April 1, 1933 (aged 60) Madrid, Spain
- Areas: Illustrator, caricaturist, caricaturist

Joaquín Xaudaró y Echau (August 17, 1872 – April 1, 1933) was a Spanish cartoonist, illustrator, and caricaturist. His humorous depictions of the new technologies of his time –he published a volume of cartoons called The Perils of Flight (Les péripéties de l'aviation, Garnier Frères, Paris, 1911)- serve as an important link between the worlds of nineteenth-century illustration and twentieth-century cartooning.

== Style of humor ==
Xaudaró's observations on contemporary culture and technology, as well as his gentle but insightful sense of humor, are apparent in such cartoons as "El telégrafo sin hilos," "Un retrato futurista," "El auto que pasa," "Despertar en Biarritz," "El leopardo inglés en Spyon-Kop." In another work, Chamberlain seems to receive a "punch" from Kruger, which alludes to the atrocious "Jameson Raid".

== Career ==
Born in Vigan in the Philippines (at the time still a Spanish possession), Xaudaró's family, of Aragonese origin, settled in Barcelona in 1883. Xaudaró was educated in Paris and London. He began his career drawing for Madrid Cómico, La Saeta, Gedeón, and Barcelona Cómica, a Barcelona-based humor magazine of the 1890s, occasionally utilizing the pseudonym J. O'Raduax ("Xaudaró" spelled backwards). Between 1907 and 1914, he also drew for the Paris-based periodical Le Rire.

Xaudaró subsequently worked for the Madrid-based periodicals Blanco y Negro and ABC. His daily vignettes for ABC brought him fame, with each one containing a trademark little dog that soon became known as "el perrito de Xaudaró."

His book illustrations include those commissioned by the Paris publisher Ollendorff (Les conteurs joyeux), and famously, those utilized for Juan Pérez Zúñiga's Los viajes morrocotudos ("The Fantastic Voyages"). Xaudaró's works of collected cartoons include Los Sports, an album of sports-related vignettes published by Editorial Luis Tasso in the 1920s and Xaudaró: Tomos de Chistes (ca. 1932), a collection of his work that had been published in Blanco y Negro at the end of the nineteenth century.

Xaudaró also did scenographical work for a production of Madame Butterfly. At the end of his life, he founded, with Antonio Got and K-Hito, the Sociedad Española de Dibujos Animados (SEDA) in 1932. He collaborated on an animated film with K-Hito. Xaudaró died in Madrid.
