= Música Nueva =

Spanish online music magazine

Música News
- Logo of the Música News online magazine
- Editor: Alessandro Elia
- Frequency: Online
- Founded: 2012; 14 years ago
- Company: MN Editores SL
- Country: Spain
- Based in: Valencia
- Language: Spanish
- Website: Cómo hacerlo todo

Música Nueva (Spanish for "New Music") is a Spanish online music magazine published in Valencia. Its complete title is "Música Nueva, Noticias y Novedades" ("New Music, the latest music news").

== History and profile ==
Founded in 2012 by Italian journalist and writer Alessandro Elia, Música Nueva has currently between 100000 and 180000 visitors per week, with pages about music news, song and album reviews, TV, movies and pop culture. Users and readers come mainly from United States (Florida, California, New Mexico), Spain and Mexico, but also from all the Latin American countries (Argentina, Colombia, Venezuela, Uruguay, Chile). On 5 December 2015 the magazine had 30,592 Alexa Rank in the U.S. and 54,586 in Spain.

== See also ==
- List of magazines in Spain
