= Fotogramas =

Spanish language monthly film magazine

- Cover of the November 2024 issue, featuring Paul Mescal in Gladiator II
- Categories: Film magazine
- Frequency: Monthly
- Founder: Antonio Nadal-Rodó; María Fernanda Gañán
- Founded: 1946
- First issue: 15 November 1946; 78 years ago
- Company: Hearst Communications
- Country: Spain
- Based in: Barcelona; Madrid
- Language: Spanish
- Website: www.fotogramas.es

Fotogramas is a Spanish digital and print film magazine which has been in circulation since 1946. It is one of the early film magazines in Spain.

== History ==
Founded in Barcelona, it was first published on 15 November 1946 by Antonio Nadal-Rodó and María Fernanda Gañán. On 5 February 1951, the magazine awarded their first Placa de San Juan Bosco award to actor Jesús Tordesillas for his performance in 1950 film Pequeñeces. In the 1970s the magazine was part of the Nadal Group.

New categories were added over time to the award which were renamed Fotogramas de Plata and in 2012 they absorbed the TP de Oro awards. In 2011, the magazine was acquired by Hearst Communications. In 2018, Hearst closed the editorial office in Barcelona in order to centralize editing efforts in Madrid.

== See also ==
- List of magazines in Spain
