= Buen Humor =

Spanish satirical magazine (1921–1931)

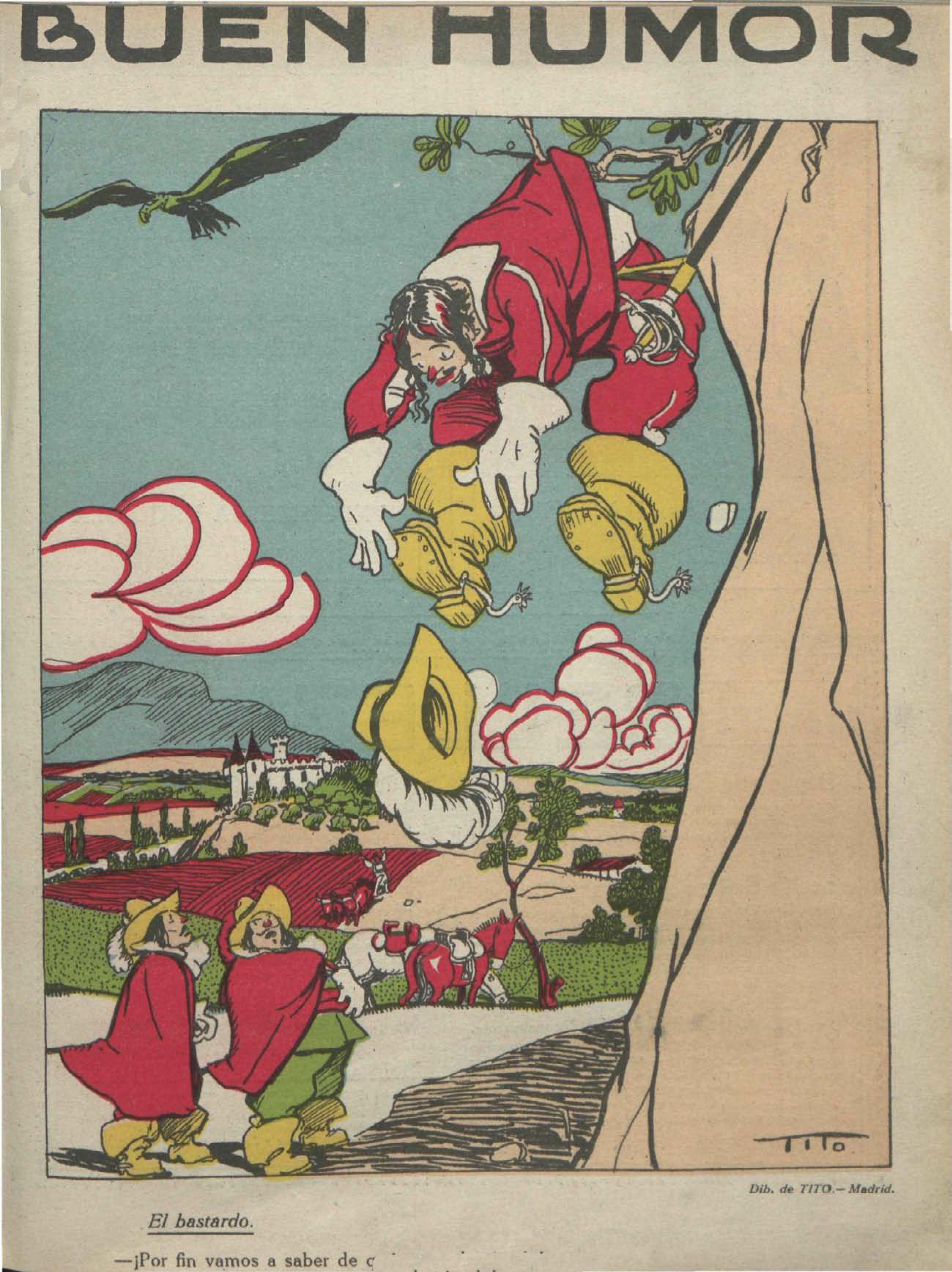
- Buen Humor cover dated 9 April 1922
- Categories: Satirical magazine; Literary magazine
- Frequency: Weekly
- Founder: Sileno
- Founded: 1921
- Final issue: 1931
- Country: Spain
- Based in: Madrid
- Language: Spanish

Buen Humor (Spanish: Good Humor) was a satirical and literary magazine published in Madrid, Spain, between 1921 and 1931. It was among the most read satirical magazines in the country during its lifetime in addition to Gutiérrez.

== History and profile ==
Buen Humor was established by graphic artist and cartoonist Pedro Antonio Villahermosa y Borao, who was also called Sileno, in 1921. Sileno edited the magazine, which covered short stories, sketches and drawings. It was published on a weekly basis. Its headquarters was in Madrid. The magazine ceased publication in 1931.

== See also ==
- List of magazines in Spain
