= Diez Minutos =

Weekly women's magazine in Spain

- Categories: Women's magazine; Celebrity magazine; Entertainment magazine
- Frequency: Weekly
- Publisher: Hearst Magazines Espana S.L.
- Founded: 1951; 75 years ago
- Company: Hearst Corporation
- Country: Spain
- Based in: Madrid
- Language: Spanish
- Website: Diez Minutos

Diez Minutos (Spanish: Ten Minutes) is a Spanish language weekly celebrity, entertainment and women's magazine published in Madrid, Spain. The magazine has been in circulation since 1951.

== History and profile ==
Diez Minutos was started in 1951. It has its headquarters in Madrid. The magazine was part of Lagardère SCA and was published by Hachette Filipacchi Médias until May 2011 when it was sold to Hearst Corporation. It is published by Hearst Magazines Espana S.L. on a weekly basis and offers news on celebrities. The magazine has published similar news about Spanish politicians since 2000. Milagros Valdé is one of the former editors-in-chief of the magazine.

== Circulation ==
Diez Minutos was one of the best-selling magazines in Spain in the mid-1990s. In 2003 the magazine sold 206,284 copies. The circulation grew to 281,524 copies in 2004. In 2007 its circulation further rose to 376,101 copies. Diez Minutos sold 323,016 copies in 2009, making it the third best-selling women's magazine in Spain.

The circulation of Diez Minutos was 333,203 copies in 2010 and 337,177 copies in 2011. Its circulation was 293,235 copies in 2012.

== See also ==
- List of magazines in Spain
