= Zero (Spanish magazine) =

Spanish magazine

- Editor: Miguel Ángel López
- Categories: Gay
- Frequency: Monthly
- First issue: 1998
- Final issue: 2009
- Company: Grupo Zero Comunicación
- Country: Spain
- Based in: Madrid
- Language: Spanish
- Website: zero-web.com
- ISSN: 1575-0566

Zero is an LGBT themed national magazine that was published in Spain. 120 issues were published between 1998 and 2009. Zero was also utilized as a means for various famous men to publicize their homosexuality for the first time through appearing on the cover.

== History and contents ==
Zero was published monthly and featured opinion, gay news, articles, interviews and tourism. Some months, the magazines featured also the ZDM (Zero de moda/fashion), Cuídate (men care), Decora (decoration and design) and Destino (tourism) supplements. There were also fixed sections including letters from readers and a section called De Zero a 100 (From Zero to 100) that was dedicated to art, music, and theater. Each issues was approximately 150 pages long. During the magazines most affluent years 40,000-50,000 copies were published. Its headquarters was in Madrid. The magazine was also found in other parts of Europe, including Portugal, Greece, Andorra, France, Germany, United Kingdom, Switzerland and Belgium.

Zero started as a free gay magazine in Madrid until 1998 when it became a national magazine with monthly issues. Celebrities who have appeared in the cover include José Luis Rodríguez Zapatero (Spanish prime minister), Jesús Vázquez (a famous Spanish television host) and Jake Shears. Some of the more controversial people to appear on the cover include José Mantero (catholic priest), Joan Miguel Perpinya (member of the Spanish Civil Guard), and José María Sánchez Silva (lieutenant general in the Spanish army).

The last issue appeared in July 2009 and attempts to continue publication were abandoned in November 2009 as a result of financial issues.

== See also ==
- List of magazines in Spain
