= Manuel Paso =

Spanish poet and playwright

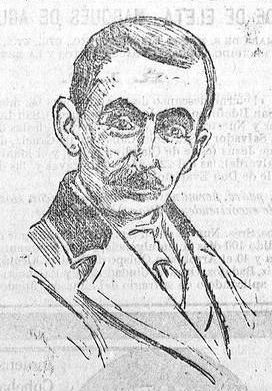
portrait of Manuel paso

Manuel Paso (1864–1901) was a Spanish poet and playwright.

Born in Granada, he was the lesser-known of the five Spanish so-called “autores premodernistas” (pre-Modernist poetry) Manuel Reina, Salvador Rueda, Ricardo Gil, and Carlos Fernández Shaw.

He worked for the magazines Germinal and La Democracia Social and his poems were also published in Los Madriles.

Paso died of tuberculosis at the age of 35.

== Publications ==
- 1886: Nieblas

== Drama ==
- 1898: Curro Vargas (with Joaquín Dicenta and music by Ruperto Chapí)
- 1900: La Cortijera (with Joaquín Dicenta and music by Ruperto Chapí)

== Bibliography ==
- A. W. Phillips "En torno a la poesía de Manuel Paso, olvidado escritor granadino" in L. T. González del Valle, D. Villanueva, Ed. Estudios en honor a Ricardo Gullón, Nebraska, pp. 263–278
