= Política Exterior =

Foreign affairs magazine in Spain

- Editor: Aurea Molto
- Categories: Foreign affairs magazine
- Frequency: Bimonthly
- Publisher: Estudios de Política Exterior, S.A
- Founded: 1987; 39 years ago
- Country: Spain
- Based in: Madrid
- Language: Spanish
- Website: https://www.politicaexterior.com/
- ISSN: 0213-6856
- OCLC: 23162495

Política Exterior is a bimonthly foreign affairs magazine published in Madrid, Spain. It has been in circulation since 1987. Its subtitle is Economía y Tecnología (Spanish: Economy and Technology).

== History and profile ==
Política Exterior was established in 1987. The magazine is published by Estudios de Política Exterior, S.A. on a bimonthly basis. Darío Valcárcel is among the former editors of the magazine. As of September 2022 Aurea Molto is the editor. It covers articles on international relations and has its headquarters in Madrid.

== See also ==
- List of magazines in Spain
