= Teresa (magazine) =

Former monthly women's magazine in Spain (1954–1977)

- Categories: Women's magazine
- Frequency: Monthly
- Publisher: Servicio de Prensa y Propaganda
- Founded: 1954
- First issue: January 1954
- Final issue: 1977
- Company: Sección Femenina
- Country: Spain
- Based in: Madrid
- Language: Spanish

Teresa was a monthly women's magazine which was in circulation in the period 1954–1977 in Madrid, Spain. Its subtitle was Revista para todas las mujeres (Spanish: Magazine For All Women). The title of the magazine was a reference to Saint Teresa of Avila. It was one of the official media outlets of Sección Femenina, the women's branch of the Falange political party.

== History and profile ==
Teresa was first published in January 1954. The magazine adopted a conservative political stance, but it was less conservative than Medina and Y: Revista para la mujer nacional sindicalista which had been the official organs of the Sección Femenina in the 1940s. It was published by Servicio de Prensa y Propaganda, a publishing company of Sección Femenina, on a monthly basis.

Target audience of Teresa was young and university-aged women. The magazine featured articles dealing with fashion, politics, science and cinema. Its fashion content mostly addressed the comfortables clothes for working women. The magazine presented a model for ideal Spanish women which was significantly different from the earlier models promoted by previous women's magazines of the Sección Femenina. For Teresa ideal women were those with moral, intellectual and elegant qualities. In April 1954 the Spanish psychoanalyst Carolina Zamora published an article on Sigmund Freud and his psychoanalysis approach in relation to religion arguing that the conflict between the Catholic Church and psychoanalysis should be ended and that there was a Catholic psychoanalysis movement.

Until 1975 the price of Teresa was 25 Ptas which was much cheaper than those of other magazines. The magazine folded in 1977.
