= Pronto (magazine) =

Spanish celebrity and women's magazine

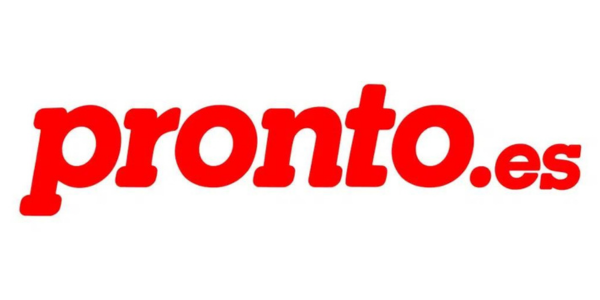
- Logo of the magazine
- Categories: Celebrity magazine Women's magazine
- Frequency: Weekly
- Founded: 1972; 54 years ago
- Company: Grupo Heres
- Country: Spain
- Based in: Barcelona
- Language: Spanish
- Website: www.pronto.es

Pronto (Spanish: Quick) is a Spanish language celebrity and women's magazine which is published weekly in Barcelona, Spain. The magazine has been in circulation since 1972. It is the most read magazine in the country.

== History and profile ==
Pronto was established in 1972. The magazine which offers news about celebrities is part of Grupo Heres. The headquarters of the magazine, which is published weekly on Mondays, is in Barcelona.

== Circulation ==
Pronto has a high circulation like the other Spanish celebrity weekly, ¡Hola!. In 1993, Pronto had a circulation of 695,585 copies, making it the best-selling magazine in Spain. It was the second best selling magazine in the country with a circulation of 807,232 copies in 1997.

In 2001, it was one of top 50 women's magazine worldwide with a circulation of 878,000 copies. The average circulation of Pronto was 921,855 copies in 2003 and 1,013,016 copies in 2004, making it the best selling magazine in Spain. During the period between 2003 and May 2005, Pronto was the second most read magazine in Spain.

Pronto was the best-selling Spanish magazine in 2005 with a circulation of 1,000,580 copies. Its circulation fell to 962,000 copies in 2006. In 2008 Pronto was the best selling magazine in Spain with a circulation of 974,254 copies.

Pronto sold 971,248 copies in 2009, making it the largest magazine in Spain and the third best-selling weekly European women's magazine. Its circulation was 958,374 copies in 2010 and 931,419 copies in 2011. The circulation of the magazine was 910,055 copies in 2012. The weekly was again best selling magazine in Spain in 2013.

== See also ==
- List of magazines in Spain
