= Antonio Fontán =

Spanish journalist and anti-Francoist (1923–2010)

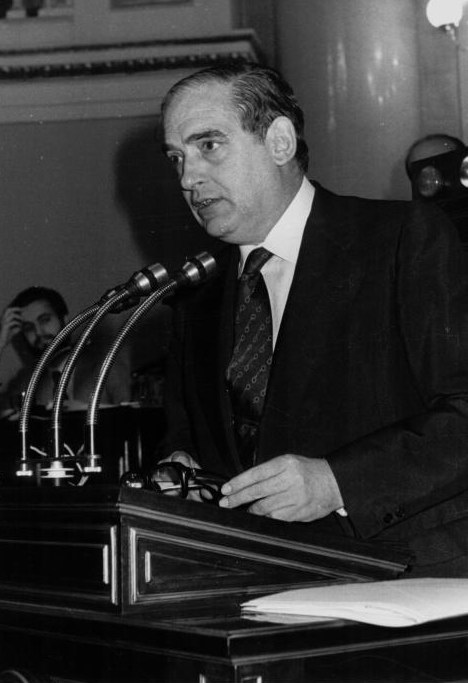
- Antonio Fontán, the Spanish journalist who fought for press freedom. He later became the first President of the Senate, following the adoption of a democratic constitution.
- Born: Antonio Fontán Pérez; 15 October 1923; Seville, Spain
- Died: January 14, 2010 (aged 86)
- Education: University of Seville
- Occupations: Journalist, politician

Antonio Fontán Pérez, 1st Marquess of Guadalcanal (15 October 1923 – 14 January 2010) was a Spanish journalist recognized for his work in promoting press freedom in his country. He was also a well-known Catholic and a member of Opus Dei.

Antonio Fontán was the editor of the independent newspaper Madrid from 1967 to 1971. The periodical openly criticized Francisco Franco's authoritarian rule. In 1968, the government began a campaign against the newspaper, in which Fontán was prosecuted 19 times and fined 10 times in the span of four months. In October 1971, the authorities demanded Fontán's resignation, closing down the paper a few weeks later. Fontán's staunch defense of the principles of free expression during those five years as editor earned him and his staff a unique place in the annals of Spanish journalism.

In 1977, Fontán was elected to the Spanish Senate as a member of the Unión de Centro Democrático, in the first democratic general elections after the end of Francoist Spain. During his career, Fontán co-authored Spain's Constitution of 1978, which recognized freedom of expression and freedom of information as fundamental rights. He also served as a minister from 1979 to 1982.

At the time of his death, Fontán was the president and publisher of Nueva Revista de Política, Cultura y Arte, a bimonthly news magazine, which he founded in 1990. The International Press Institute (IPI) has named him one of the "Heroes of Press Freedom."

== Early years ==
Fontán was born in Seville, Spain, on October 15, 1923. He attended the University of Seville where he received his doctorate in classical philology in 1948, and was active in clandestine, royalist and liberal circles. In addition, he studied journalism at the Official School of Madrid. Fontán founded the monthly Nuestro Tiempo in 1954. He was the director of a weekly magazine, La Actualidad Española before joining the evening paper, Madrid, in September 1966, shortly after the introduction of a new press law which lifted prior censorship.

== Struggle for press freedom in Francoist Spain ==
Fontán was appointed editor-in-chief of Madrid on April 15, 1967. He soon learned that the end of censorship did not necessarily mean true freedom of the press. Madrid quickly became unpopular with the authorities for its coverage of such taboo subjects as student and labor unrest, the growth of regionalism, illegal trade unionism, and opposition party activities. Fontán and his paper were bombarded with sanctions for publishing articles defending democracy and civil liberties, and criticizing Francoist Spain. Between January 1967 and May 1968 alone, proceedings were initiated against the paper on 12 separate occasions. Madrid was shut down for four months on May 30, 1968, inflicting heavy financial losses on the paper. The paper continued to pay the salaries of its staff during this time.

After Madrid's reappearance on September 30, 1968, judicial proceedings against the paper continued on a regular basis. Finally, in October 1971, the Minister of Information, Sánchez Bella, demanded the replacement of Fontán with a journalist close to the Falange party and the appointment of a director to represent the Ministry. In the case of refusal, Sánchez Bella warned that the newspaper would be temporarily suspended and an investigation started to consider its permanent closure. However, Madrid's publisher and principal owner, Rafael Calvo Serer, refused to agree to these conditions. The paper's editorial staff formed a journalists' association, the first of its kind in Spain, to defend the independence and dignity of the profession and to fight for the retention in office of the present editor.

At the end of October, 1971, the Spanish Information Ministry issued an order informing the newspaper that an investigation had been launched to examine "irregularities" in the original listing of its stockholders. The newspaper had 10 days to answer the inquiry. The government was empowered to cancel the paper's registration, thus closing it, if the paper could not "clarify" or explain the irregularities.

On November 25, 1971, after the paper published an article critical of General Franco's right-hand man, Admiral Luis Carrero Blanco, the Ministry of Information removed Madrid from the register of press publishers, allegedly because of irregularities in the paper's ownership. The Ministry also told the paper to cease publishing. The banning of Madrid affected public opinion and was widely criticized by the Spanish press. "To close an economically sound and well-read paper is murder," commented the Catholic paper Ecclesia.

Madrid's journalists and workers agreed to support the management and not surrender the newspaper to the official trade unions, which had offered to take charge of the newspaper under a new editor and with its own editorial line. "We are ready to sell the presses to pay the staff rather than agree that the paper should lose its independence," the journalists said. Madrid stayed closed. Calvo Serer, who went into exile in France a few days before the government closed the paper, was tried in absentia and charged with actions "prejudicial to the reputation and authority of the State."

When democracy was restored in Spain after Franco's death and the monarchy was re-established in 1975, the Supreme Court revoked the order to close down Madrid. The state was ordered to pay damages to the paper, but this was not enough to restart the daily, which had sold everything in order to compensate its employees.

== Work in politics and academics ==
Fontán was elected to the Senate as a member of the Unión de Centro Democrático coalition party in the first democratic general elections in June 1977. He was one of the authors of the country's Constitution of 1978, which recognized freedom of expression and freedom of information as fundamental rights. He also served as a minister of the government from 1979 to 1982.

In addition to journalism and politics, Fontán led an active career in academia. He set up the first university-level school of journalism in Spain at the University of Navarra in 1958. The university was under the guidance of the Roman Catholic prelature of Opus Dei, of which he was a numerary member.

He was made an honorary life member of the International Press Institute in 1984. He was also named one of the institute's 50 World Press Freedom Heroes of the 20th century.

Fontán was the president and publisher of Nueva Revista de Política, Cultura y Arte, a bimonthly magazine on current affairs, which he founded in 1990.

He was made Marquess of Guadalcanal (In spanish: Marqués de Guadalcanal), in July 2008, by King Juan Carlos I as an homage to his contributions to political freedom and civil peace in Spain.

Spanish nobility
New creation	Marquess of Guadalcanal; 2008–2010	Succeeded by Eugenio Fontán
