= Frente de Juventudes =

Francoist political party

National Delegation of the Youth Front Delegación Nacional del Frente de Juventudes
- Founded: 6 December 1940
- Dissolved: 7 April 1977
- Headquarters: Madrid
- Ideology: Francoism; National Catholicism; Falangism
- Colours: Blue, red, black, and white
- Mother party: FET y de las JONS

The National Delegation of the Youth Front (Spanish: Delegación Nacional del Frente de Juventudes) was a political-administrative body created in Spain in 1940 as the autonomous youth section of FET y de las JONS, the sole legal party during the dictatorship of General Franco (1936–1975).

The Youth Front was established to organize and politically indoctrinate Spanish youth according to the principles of the so-called Movimiento Nacional, the coalition of political and social forces that supported the military uprising against the Second Spanish Republic, which led to the Spanish Civil War and Franco's rise to power.

Prior to its creation, several youth organizations existed within the parties supporting the uprising, most notably the "Pelayos" (Traditionalist youth) and the "Balillas" (the original name of the Spanish Falange and JONS youth organization). Following the Unification Decree of 1937, these were renamed as Youth Organizations, whose second and final delegate was Sancho Dávila until 1940. These organizations were dissolved and integrated into the newly created Youth Front.

As Francoism evolved, the Youth Front adapted its objectives and composition in line with the political changes of the regime. In November 1961, its name was changed to the National Delegation of Youth (Delegación Nacional de Juventud), reflecting a less militant character. In January 1970, following a major reorganization of the General Secretariat of the Movement (the regime's highest political body), it was again restructured under the same name. The organization continued to operate until the end of the regime in 1977.

== Institutional purposes ==
The aims of the Youth Front were clearly outlined in its Foundational Law and were directed at all Spanish youth — both those affiliated voluntarily and those unaffiliated. The latter group, referred to as "framed," included "schoolchildren" (students of all educational levels), "apprentices" (young workers), and "rural" youth (peasants). This inclusive reach was a distinctive feature of the Youth Front and demonstrated its significant influence on Spanish society at the time.

For affiliated youth, the purposes were as follows (Article 7 of the Law):
a) Political education in the spirit and doctrine of the Movimiento Nacional.
b) Physical and sports education.
c) Pre-military training.
d) Introduction to domestic education for female youth.
e) Collaboration in cultural, moral, and social formation alongside the institutions to which they belonged, as well as providing religious education in accordance with Church teachings.
f) Organization and management of camps, colonies, shelters, courses, academies, and other similar activities to fulfill its objectives.
g) Supporting the work of the State, particularly in matters of health, education, and labor, with respect to its members.

For unaffiliated youth, the purposes were defined as follows (Article 8):
a) Political initiation.
b) Physical education.
c) Organization of summer camps and similar activities subsidized by public corporations, as well as the supervision of those organized by private entities.
d) Oversight of adherence to the principles of the Movimiento Nacional in educational and work centers concerning youth.

== Organization and structure ==
To fulfill its assigned responsibilities, the Youth Front was organized into various bodies, some personal and others collective in nature.

At the head of the Delegation was the National Delegate of the Youth Front, who was freely appointed by the National Chief of the Traditionalist Spanish Falange and the National Syndicalist Movement Offensive Board, Francisco Franco, upon the proposal of the Secretary General, to whom the Delegate was hierarchically subordinate, as established in Article 11 of the founding law. While the law did not explicitly address the removal of the Delegate, Article 23 of the Statute of the Movement specified that each service would be led by a Delegate "appointed and dismissed freely by the National Chief."

The organization was structured into various services or departments responsible for carrying out assigned tasks. This structure was not entirely stable or permanent; although it underwent several modifications, it consistently maintained its foundational objectives.

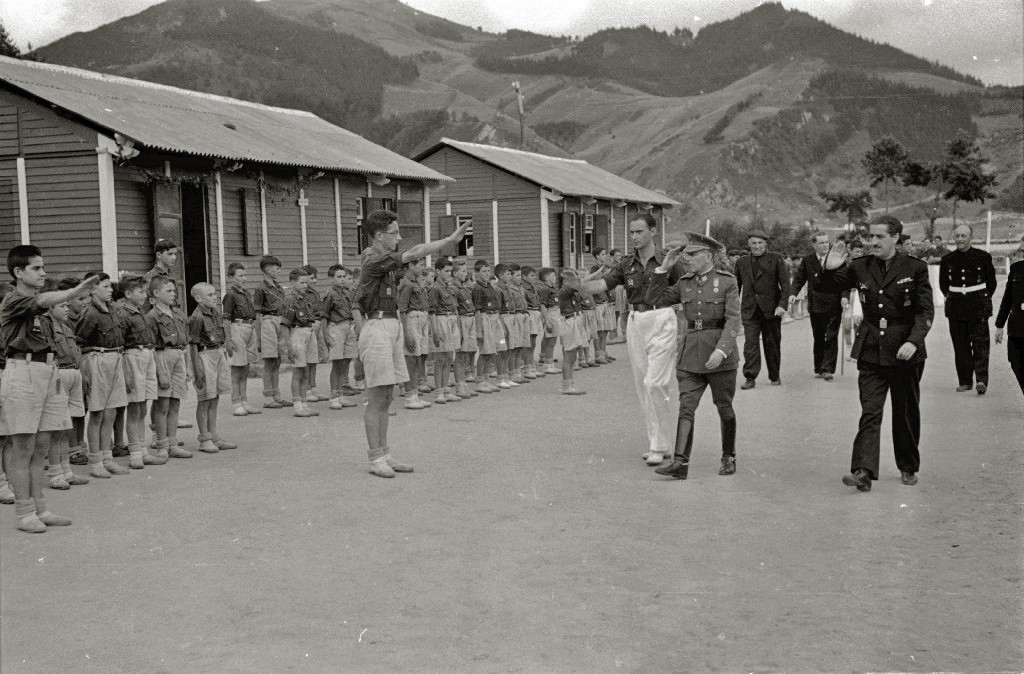
Military authorities visiting the Youth Front camp in Orio, Gipuzkoa.

The founding law also established the roles of a physical education advisor and a religion advisor. The first individuals to hold these positions were Lieutenant General Joaquín Agulla and Jiménez-Coronado and Patriarch Leopoldo Eijo y Garay, respectively.

Within the organization, several specialized units operated, especially in its early years. Among them was the University Union (SEU), composed mainly of university students. There were also central sections dedicated to education, responsible for all activities related to teaching assigned to the Youth Front. This included overseeing teachers of National Spirit and Physical Education and managing textbooks for those subjects.

The Work Centers Section focused on young workers. One of its tools was the "Teaching Evenings," periods during which companies allowed apprentices to attend activities and classes organized by the Youth Front. Later, the "Vocational Training Competitions" were introduced and even reached an international level. Additionally, a Rural Section served peasant youth.

The Organic Standard of 1962 referred to the Section of Professional Activities, which included two main areas: Agricultural Training and Vocational Training.

The founding law also envisioned the creation of Naval and Air Sections. The Air Section was never established, while the Naval Section aimed to train young people who would perform their military service in the navy, as well as those aspiring to careers in the navy, merchant marine, fishing fleet, and related auxiliary services.

== Organization of affiliates ==
Voluntarily affiliated youth were organized into the Phalanges of Volunteers, later known as Franco's Youth Phalanges (Falanges Juveniles de Franco). These were structured into three groups or legions based on age: Arrows (Flechas, ages 10 to 13), Cadets (Cadetes, ages 14 to 16), and Guides (Guías, ages 17 to 20).

The basic unit of organization was the squadron (escuadra), with ranks including squad leader, phalanx, century, and legion. The leadership of the Youth Front at the provincial level was entrusted to the provincial assistant. Among the most notable activities carried out by the Youth Front were households, camps, marches, and mountain schools.

By the 1950s, the Youth Front had become increasingly outdated, mainly due to its strong political and ideological components. This decline ultimately led to its dissolution. However, its sports and cultural activities continued, resulting in the creation of the Spanish Youth Organization (Organización Juvenil Española, OJE) in 1960. The OJE emerged as an independent youth association, free of political content, and focused on providing educational and recreational activities for children and adolescents.

== Services and activities ==
The services and activities developed by the Youth Front were extensive and diverse, encompassing not only the educational field but also free time, cultural, and informational initiatives.

Among the most prominent free-time activities were sports tournaments and competitions, camps and hostels, and various cultural and leisure activities such as theater, model airplane building, and school health programs. The organization also created and managed companies and initiatives including the Blue Chain of Broadcasting (Cadena Azul de Radiodifusión, BCB), the Travel Office TEET (Tourism, Exchange, and Educational Trips), the Spanish Network of Youth Hostels, the Youth Bazaar Network, and the publishing house Editorial Doncel. Through Doncel, the Youth Front published comics such as Balalín (1957–1959) and Trinca (1970–1973).

In the strictly educational sphere, the Youth Front operated a network of primary schools and secondary boarding schools (colegios menores). Additionally, it held exclusive authority over the organization, teaching, and evaluation—at all educational levels—of certain subjects known as the "disciplines of the Movement." These included physical education, political education (which underwent various name changes throughout the regime), and, for girls, subjects grouped under "home teachings." Before the establishment of the Faculties of Information Sciences, even the Official School of Journalism was under the Youth Front's control.

The core human resource of the Youth Front was its Special Corps of Instructor Officers, who were trained at the José Antonio Command Academy in Madrid. These instructors were qualified in physical education, civic-social training, and camp leadership.

== Bibliography ==
- Juventudes de Vida Española. Manuel Parra Celaya (2001).
- Jesús Cuadrado (2000). Atlas español de la cultura popular: De la historieta y su uso, 1873-2000. Madrid: Ediciones Sinsentido / Fundación Germán Sánchez Ruipérez. 2 v. ISBN 84-89384-23-1.
- Los Campamentos del Frente de Juventudes. Cesáreo Jarabo Jordán (2007).
- Crónica del alpinismo español. César Pérez de Tudela.
- Juventudes en pie de paz. Escritos y discursos del creador del Frente de Juventudes. Enrique Sotomayor Gippini (2002).
- Auge y ocaso del Frente de Juventudes. Antonio Alcoba López (2002).
- Prietas las filas. Un niño en el frente de Juventudes. Luis del Val (1999).
