= Automóvil =

Monthly automobile magazine in Spain

- Editor-in-chief: Juan Carlos Payo
- Categories: Automobile magazine
- Frequency: Monthly
- Publisher: Motorpress Iberica S.A
- Founded: 1978; 47 years ago
- Company: Motorpress Iberica
- Country: Spain
- Based in: Madrid
- Language: Spanish
- Website: Automóvil

Automóvil is a Spanish language monthly automobile magazine published in Madrid, Spain. It is the oldest car magazine in the country.

== History and profile ==
Automóvil was started in 1978. The magazine is owned and published by Motorpress Iberica S.A. on a monthly basis. Its editor-in-chief is Juan Carlos Payo. The magazine has its headquarters in Madrid and covers news on local and international automobile sector and new arrivals.

In 2009 Automóvil had a circulation of 90,071 copies, making it the best-selling automobile magazine in Spain.

== See also ==
- List of magazines in Spain
