= Chumy Chúmez =

Spanish cartoon humorist, writer and film director

Jose María González Castrillo, more known as Chumy Chúmez (May 8, 1927 – April 10, 2003), was a Spanish cartoon humorist, writer and film director.

== Biography ==
Born in San Sebastián, Guipúzcoa, received training as mercantile professor and later studied drawing and painting. Due to his passion for painting he travelled to Madrid, where he would be devoted to humor, with sporadic collaborations in newspapers and later regularly in the weekly magazines La Codorniz and Triunfo and also in the newspaper Madrid, in which he used to write on the third page until it was suspended by government order in 1971. He also contributed Mundo Hispánico magazine. During the transition towards democracy in Spain he collaborated with the humor weekly magazine Hermano Lobo, of which he was a founder.

In the 1960s he directed several documentaries, a majority on Andalusian localities. He also collaborated writing up cinematographic scripts and he got to write some of his own. He also directed several films, among them, Dios bendiga cada rincón de esta casa (1977) and ¿Pero no vas a cambiar nunca Margarita? (1978), produced by Manuel Summers.

He worked as panelist in radio (Protagonistas and Las mañanas de Radio 1) and television (Este país necesita un repaso).

Of his facet as a writer, it is possible to mention Yo fui feliz en la guerra (1986), an autobiography about his memories of the Spanish Civil War. Other titles are Por fin un hombre honrado (1994) and Pase Vd. sin llamar (1995) He was also known as a lecturer and contributor.

Throughout his life he received several prizes, the Paleta Agromán Prize (1977), the Mingote Prize (1985), the Prize of Journalism Francisco Cerecedo (1991) and the Latin American Prize of Graphical Humor Quevedos (2002).

On April 10, 2003, Chumy died of liver cancer. Part of his ashes remained in Spain, whereas the rest was scattered near Cascais.
