= Miquel Crusafont i Pairó =

Spanish paleontologist (1910–1983)

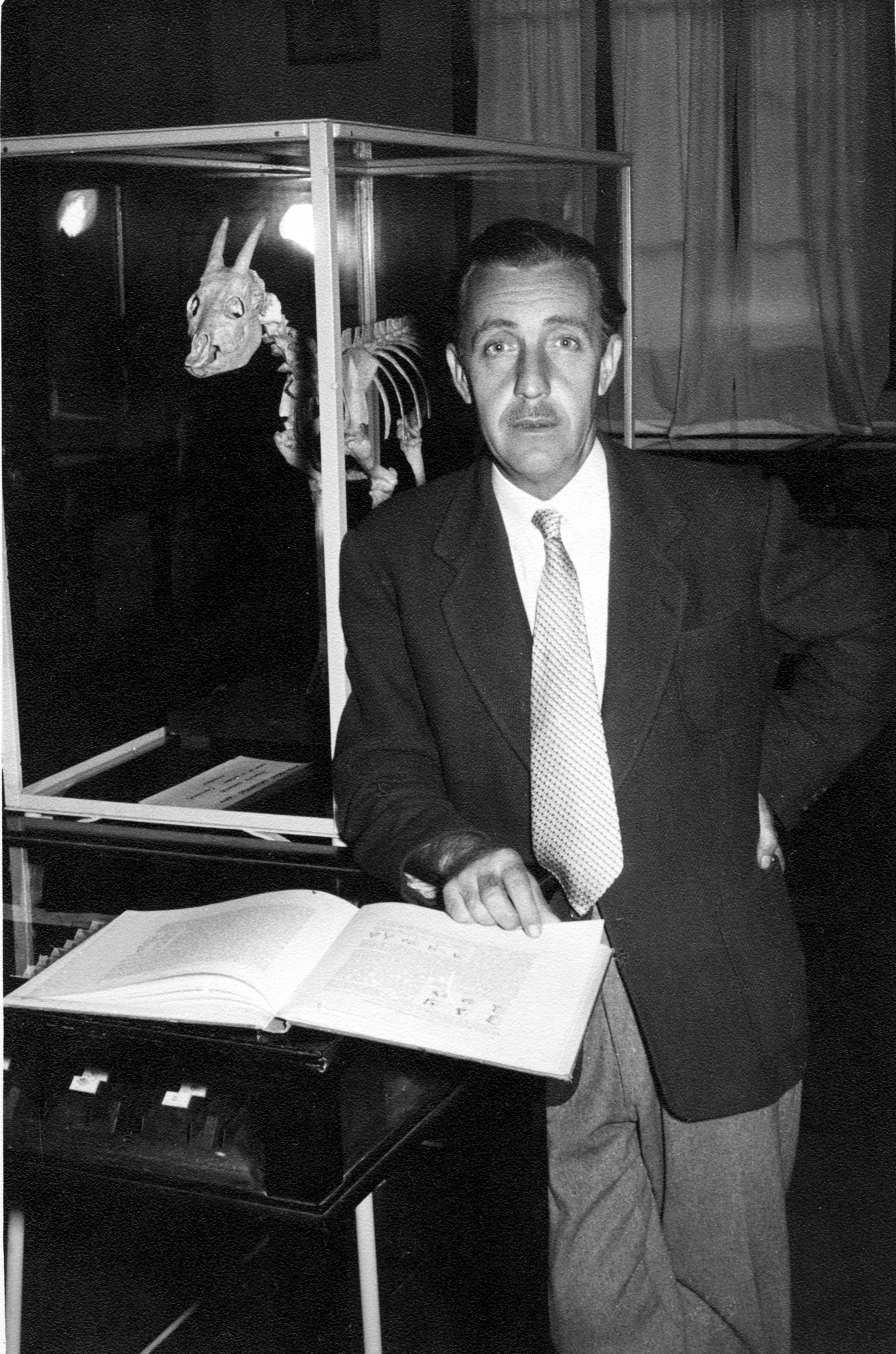
- Born: 1910; Sabadell, Spain
- Died: 1983
- Occupation: paleontologist

Miquel Crusafont i Pairó (1910 in Sabadell, Spain – 1983) was a Spanish paleontologist, specializing in mammal bones.

== Life ==
He obtained a degree in Pharmacy in the University of Barcelona in 1933, and a further degree in Natural Sciences from the University of Madrid in 1950. From 1945 he contributed to the Barcelona-based popular science magazine Ibérica.

He was unanimously elected Professor of Paleontology at the University of Oviedo as first in his field, and then accepted the post of Professor of Anthropology in the Societatis Iesu in Barcelona.

Among his most important works are Los Vertebrados del Mioceno Continental de la cuenca del Vallés-Penedés (1943, with Josep Fernández de Villalta), El Mioceno Continental del Vallès y sus yacimientos de vertebrados (1948, with Josep Fernández de Villalta); El Burdigaliense continental de la cuenca del Vallès-Penedès (1955, with Josep Fernández de Villalta and Jaume Truyols), Estudio Masterométricos en la evolución de los Fisípedos (1957, with Jaume Truyols); La Evolución (1966, with Bermudo Meléndez and Emiliano Aguirre).

In 1969 he founded the Institut Provincial de Paleontologia, known since 1983 as the Institut de Paleontologia Miquel Crusafont.

The prehistoric mammal Crusafontia is named after him.

== Works ==
- Proteognosia Versus Evolucionismo, Editorial Herder, 1964
