= Labores del Hogar =

Spanish women's magazine

- Categories: Women's magazine
- Frequency: Monthly
- Publisher: RBA Holding Editorial S.A
- Founded: 1926
- Company: Edipresse SA
- Country: Spain
- Based in: Barcelona
- Language: Spanish
- Website: Labores del Hogar

Labores del Hogar is a monthly women's magazine published in Barcelona, Spain. Founded in 1926 it is among the oldest publications in the country.

== History and profile ==
Labores del Hogar was started in 1926. Before it became an independent publication it was a supplement of another magazine entitled Hogar y Moda. From the Spanish Civil War in 1936 to 1952 Labores del Hogar temporarily folded.

In 1990 Edipresse SA acquired 75% of the publisher of the magazine, El Hogar y la Moda S.A. In 1993 Edipresse SA became the sole owner of the magazine. It is published by RBA Holding Editorial S.A on a monthly basis in Barcelona. It offers articles about housework, needlework and the related techniques.

The magazine has a Portuguese edition and a Romanian edition.

== See also ==
- List of magazines in Spain
