= Marquess of Guadalcanal =

Marquessate of Guadalcanal
- Creation date: 11 July 2008
- Created by: Juan Carlos I of Spain
- First holder: Antonio Fontán Pérez
- Present holder: María Teresa Fontán Oñate
- Remainder to: Heirs of the body of the grantee

Marquess of Guadalcanal (Spanish: Marqués de Guadalcanal) is a hereditary title of Spanish nobility. It was created on 11 July 2008 by King Juan Carlos I of Spain in favor of Antonio Fontán Pérez, journalist and politician.

== List of Holders ==
- Antonio Fontán Pérez, 1st Marquess of Guadalcanal (2008–2010)
- Eugenio Fontán Pérez, 2nd Marquess of Guadalcanal (2012–2017)
- María Teresa Fontán Oñate, 3rd Marchioness of Guadalcanal (2018– )
