= Trinca (comic) =

- Categories: Comic magazine
- Frequency: Weekly
- Publisher: Doncel
- Founder: Esteban Maroto
- Founded: 1970
- Final issue: 1973
- Country: Spain
- Based in: Madrid
- Language: Spanish

Trinca was a weekly comic magazine published in Madrid, Spain, from 1970 to 1973.

== Profile ==
Trinca was launched in 1970 by Doncel, a publishing house owned by the Frente de Juventudes which is an organization of the Francoist Regime for young people. The magazine was modelled on Italian magazine, Il Giornalino. Both publications had common characteristics such as educational goals and quality production. However, the editors of Trinca kept an open mind about visual contents, and support innovation in graphics, and illustration. The founder of the magazine was Esteban Maroto and its publisher was Alma de Dragón. The magazine was published on a weekly basis.

This project joined several Spanish creators who were working abroad such as Antonio Hernández Palacios, or Victor de la Fuente, and showed a complete different trend in Spanish comic publishers. Alfonso Azpiri was among the contributors to the magazine who started his career in the magazine in 1971.

== See also ==
- List of magazines in Spain
