= Vértice =

Spanish political magazine (1937–1946)

- Director: José María Alfaro
- Former editors: Manuel Halcón; Samuel Ros
- Categories: Political magazine
- Publisher: Nueva Editorial S.A
- Founded: 1937
- First issue: April 1937
- Final issue Number: 1946; 83
- Country: Spain
- Based in: San Sebastián (April 1936–December 1939); Madrid (1940–1946)
- Language: Spanish
- ISSN: 9958-8641
- OCLC: 1041564337

Vértice (Spanish: Vertex) was a monthly Falangist magazine published in Spain, between 1937 and 1946. Its subtitle was Revista nacional de la Falange. From late 1937 its subtitle was redesigned as Revista nacional de Falange Española Tradicionalista y de las J.O.N.S. The magazine was one of the early propaganda publications which supported the rule of Francisco Franco.

== History and profile ==
Vértice was started in San Sebastian in April 1937 during the Civil War and came out monthly. It was affiliated with the FET y de las JONS, also known as the Falange. Its publisher was Nueva Editorial S.A. The magazine had a large format, 355×280mm.

Some of its contributors were Federico de Urrutia, Dionisio Ridruejo, Carmen de Icaza, Martín Almagro Gorbea, José María Usandizaga and Benito Perojo. Surrealist painter José Caballero also contributed to Vértice. From April 1938 Manuel Halcón became its director, and Tono or Antonio Lara de Gavilán its artistic director. The latter held the post until December 1938 when Miguel Mihura began to work as its artistic director. Halcón edited the magazine until April 1939 and was replaced by Samuel Ros as director. José María Alfaro succeeded Ros in the post. The headquarters of the magazine moved to Madrid in December 1939. The last issue was no.83 dated 1946.
