= Los Madriles =

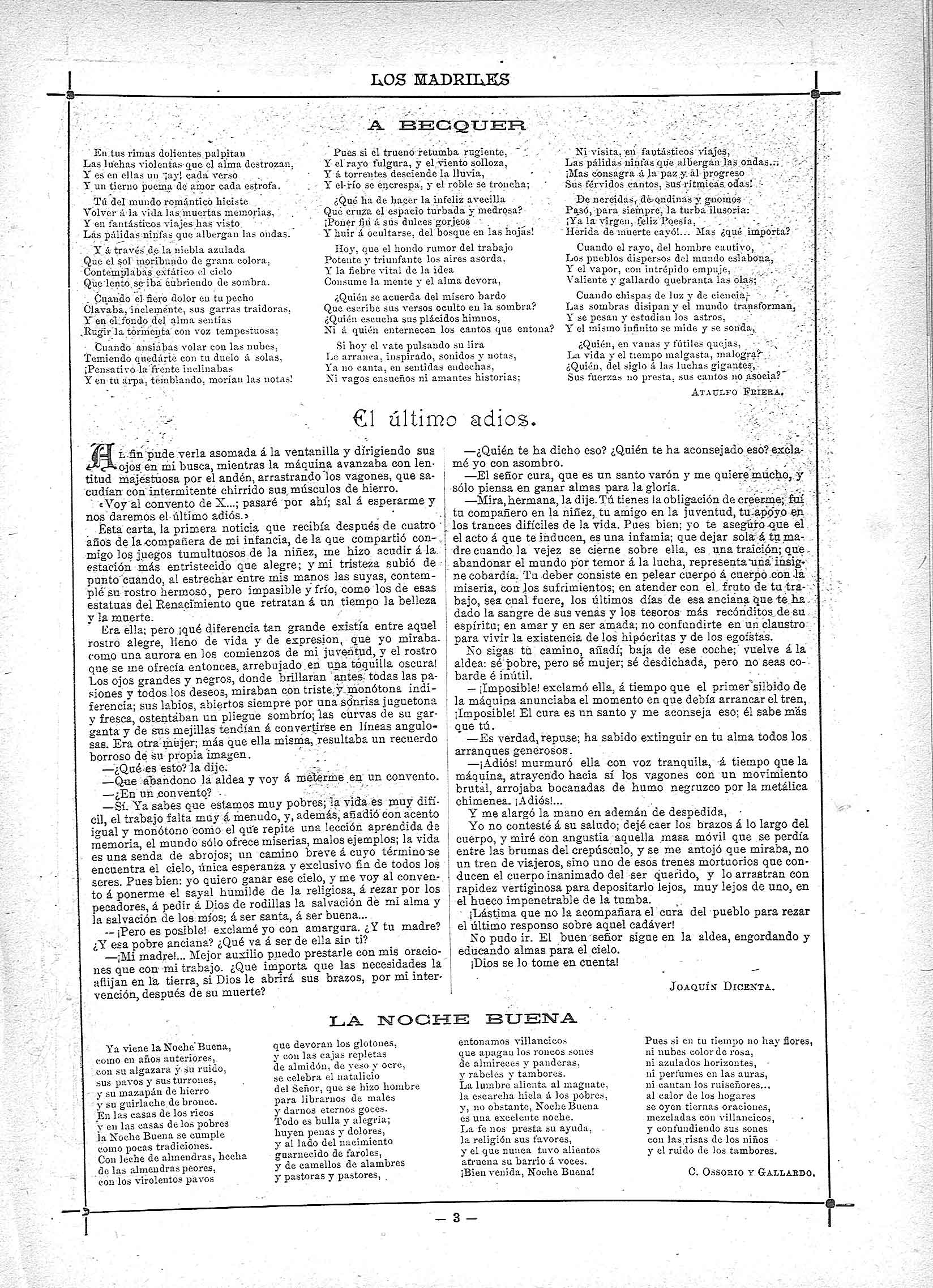
Los Madriles

Los Madriles was a weekly magazine illustrated in colour. Published in Madrid between October 1888 and July 1890, for a total of 65 issues, its first editor was Federico Urrecha, who was followed by the noted journalist, playwright and lyricist Eduardo Navarro Gonzalvo.

Collaborators included leading writers and journalists of the day, such as Leopoldo Alas (Clarín), Emilio Bobadilla (Fray Candil), Manuel Paso, José María de Pereda, Jacinto Octavio Picón, Eduardo Lustonó, and Carlos Fernández Shaw as well as the major illustrators and cartoonists of the day, including Ramón Cilla and Ángel Pons.

== See also ==
- List of magazines in Spain
