= Jaque =

Jaque (Spanish for the Chess move check) was a Spanish chess magazine, published twice a month in Valencia. It started in San Sebastian in 1970 and was the Spanish leading chess magazine since then. Some of the best chess players in the world contributed to the magazine. Its last issue was published in July 2012.

== See also ==
- List of magazines in Spain
