= Ricardo Cirera =

Spanish geomagnetist (1864–1932)

Ricardo Cirera Salse (Os de Balaguer, 1864-Barcelona, August 1932) was a geomagnetist who conducted the first geomagnetic survey of the Philippines and who founded the El Ebro Observatory in Roquetes (1904), Catalonia, Spain. He was a member of the Society of Jesus. He was involved in the founding of the popular science magazine Ibérica. Due to his work Cirera was given the Alfonso XII Grand Cross of Civil Merit by the Infanta Isabel de Borbón on 7 November 1914.
