= Álvaro de Laiglesia =

Spanish writer and humorist

Álvaro de Laiglesia (9 September 1922 - 1 August 1981) was a Spanish writer and humorist.

== Life and works ==
Álvaro de Laiglesia was born in San Sebastián on the country's north Atlantic coast, although the family base at this point was still in Madrid. He had two brothers and two sisters. The family into which he was born was a prosperous one, with a holiday home at Monte Igueldo. His grandfather had been among the founders of Spanish Credit Bank. However, during the build-up to the outbreak of the Spanish Civil War, the family fortunes went into a sharp decline, with the result that Álvaro de Laiglesia's upbringing involved several house moves to ever smaller apartments and changes of school. The family's art collection was replaced by a series of bare nails sticking out of the wall where the paintings had once hung. The king with whom his father had shared a passion for pigeon racing went into exile in 1931. During the Civil War he grew up with his mother and two sisters in San Sebastián while much of the city was destroyed in the fighting.

Laiglesia's earliest writing was for the satirical magazine La Ametralladora (Spanish: The Machine gun), which had been founded by Miguel Mihura. He was only 16 when he began contributing. The family nevertheless felt that he needed a more secure career, and after the war ended he was sent to work with the Bank of Spain. However, he only lasted at the bank for a hundred days after which, keen to see something of the world, he jumped on board a steamer sailing to Havana. In Cuba, his friend Pepín Rivero managed to get him a job with the Diario de la Marina (newspaper), with a weekly salary of ten pesos.

He returned from Cuba in March 1941. In Spain he switched to the daily newspaper Informaciones and was then, in 1942, a co-founder of the weekly news magazine La Codorniz (Spanish: The Quail), committed, according to its motto, to producing "the boldest humour for the most intelligent reader". Starting in 1944, he would be the managing editor of this publication for 33 years.

Laiglesia was a prolific and, in his time, popular novelist. His most notable works include "Un náufrago en la sopa" ("A castaway in the soup", 1944), "Todos los ombligos son redondos" ("Navels are always round", 1956), "Yo soy Fulana de Tal" ("I am Mrs so-and-so", 1963), "Réquiem por una furcia" (1970) and "Una larga y cálida meada" ("A long warm leak", 1975).

He collaborated with Miguel Mihura to write the stage play "El caso de la mujer asesinadita" ("The case of the slightly murdered woman", 1946). He also composed a number of comedy screen plays for television, including "Consultorio" ("Consultation Room", 1961), "El tercer rombo" ("The Third diamond", 1966), "Historias Naturales" (1967–1968) and "Animales Racionales" ("Rational animals", 1972) with Antonio Casal and Manolo Gómez Bur.

== Personal life ==
In 1976 Álvaro de Laiglesia married an English woman, Ann Heath. He died suddenly from a cerebral thrombosis while visiting his wife's family in Manchester, England.

== Novels ==
- Un náufrago en la sopa (1944)
- Una mosca en la sopa (1944)
- El baúl de los cadáveres (1948)
- La gallina de los huevos de plomo (1950)
- Se prohíbe llorar (1953)
- Sólo se mueren los tontos (1954)
- Dios le ampare, imbécil (1955)
- Todos los ombligos son redondos (1956)
- Más allá de tus narices (1958)
- ¡Qué bien huelen las señoras! (1958)
- En el cielo no hay almejas (1959)
- Te quiero, bestia (1960)
- Una pierna de repuesto (1960)
- Los pecados provinciales (1961)
- Tú también naciste desnudito (1961)
- Tachado por la censura (1962)
- Yo soy Fulana de Tal (1963)
- Libertad de risa (1963)
- Mundo, Demonio y Pescado (1964)
- Con amor y sin vergüenza (1964)
- Fulanita y sus menganos (1965)
- Racionales, pero animales (1966)
- Concierto en Sí amor (1967)
- Cada Juan tiene su Don (1967)
- Los que se fueron a la porra (1957)
- Se busca rey en buen estado (1968)
- Cuéntaselo a tu tía (1969)
- Nene, caca (1969)
- Réquiem por una furcia (1970)
- Mejorando lo presente (1971)
- Medio muerto nada más (1971)
- El sexy Mandamiento (1971)
- Tocata en ja (1972)
- Listo el que lo lea (1973)
- Es usted un mamífero (1974)
- Una larga y cálida meada (1975)
- Cuatro patas para un sueño (1975)
- El sobrino de Dios (1976)
- Tierra cachonda (1977)
- Se levanta la tapa de los sexos (1978)
- Los hijos de Pu (1979)
- Morir con las medias puestas (1980)
- La Codorniz sin jaula (1981)
- Mamá, teta (1981)
