= Ramon Folch i Guillèn =

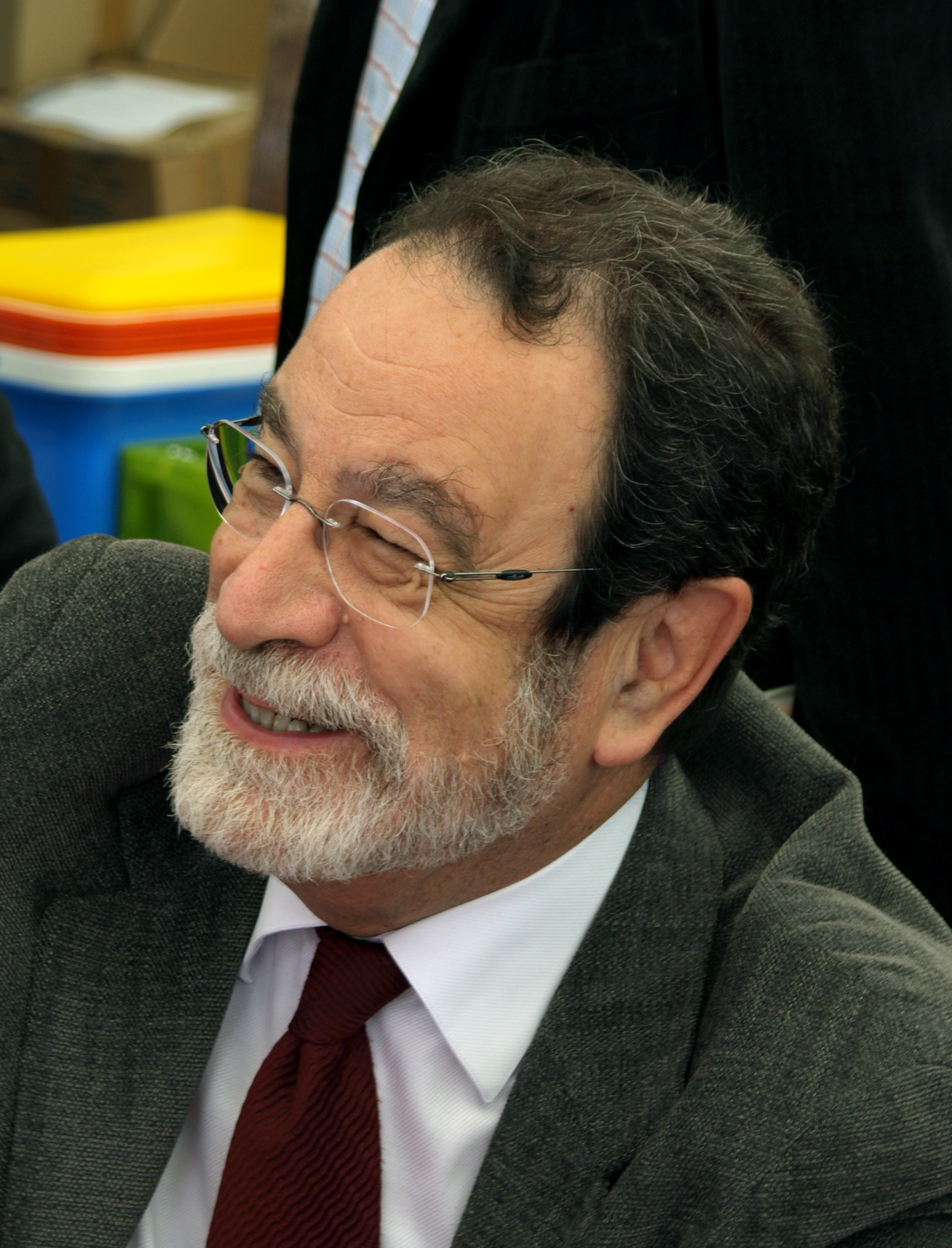
Ramon Folch in Barcelona.

Ramon Folch i Guillèn (*1946 in Barcelona) is a Catalan socio-ecologist.

== Publications ==
- L'energia en l'horitzó del 2030 (Energy towards 2030), 2005;
- El territorio como sistema (The territory as system), 2003;
- La dèria de mirar (The Craze for Looking), 2000;
- Diccionario de Socioecología (Socio-ecology dictionary), 1999;
- A four-volume series devoted to socio-ecology:

Sobre ecologismo y ecología aplicada (On ecologism and applied ecology), 1977;
Sobre ecología, educación y desarrollo (On ecology, education and development), 1990;
Sobre educación ambiental y socioecología (On environmental and socio-ecological education), 1993;
Ambiente, emoción y ética (Environment, emotion and ethics), 1998.
