= Lo Noy de la mare =

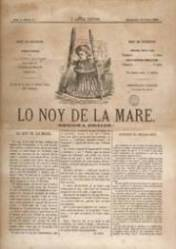
the magazine Lo Noy de la mare

Lo Noy de la mare was a humoristic and satiric weekly publication. It was written and directed by Conrad Roure, who used the pseudonym of Pau Bunyegas, among others. It was drawn by Tomás Padró. These two authors had previously worked in the magazine called “Un Tros de paper” and they decided to leave this publication to do “Lo Noy de la mare”. This magazine was first published in Barcelona in 1866, and it continued until 1867, with a total of 33 numbers. The magazine had a measurement of 310x217 mm and it contained 4 pages with 3 columns each. It had an enormous success but it had to be cancelled due to the moment circumstances, which were not good for criticism.

== Content and collaborators ==
The weekly publication was a humoristic and satiric one. However, they did not pretend to do political criticism.

A lot of extraordinary numbers were published. One of its most important illustrators was a man that signed under the name of Koki, which was supposed to be from the man Ramón Padró. In the magazine we find a lot of different pseudonyms like Lo didot, Un conco, Lo mestre, Lo padrí, among others. Conrad Roured claimed to be the owner of these pseudonyms. However, other people thought that they referred to the best writers of the moment. This could be easily deduced because there was a special number in which took part the greatest writers of the time like Manuel Angelon, Víctor Balaguer, Antoni de Bofarull, Francesc Pelagi Briz, Damas Calvet, etcetera. The drawings of the magazine were done by Tomas Padró.

A very important number of the magazine was one that contained a lithography dedicated to Ernesto Rossi. This man was a very famous actor that played the role of Otello in the theater El Prado Catalan, which was situated in Paseo de Gracia. Tomas Padró illustrated lithography about Rossi, which was an incredible success and, as a result, the magazine sold a lot of copies.

Conrad Roure and Innocenci López did another magazine called La Rambla that was published in 1867.

The collection Lo Noy de la mare was reproduced by La Campana de Gràcia between the years 1925 and 1926 as an honorific tribute to the magazine.
