= Stendek (musician) =

American musician

Philip Reilly Stendek
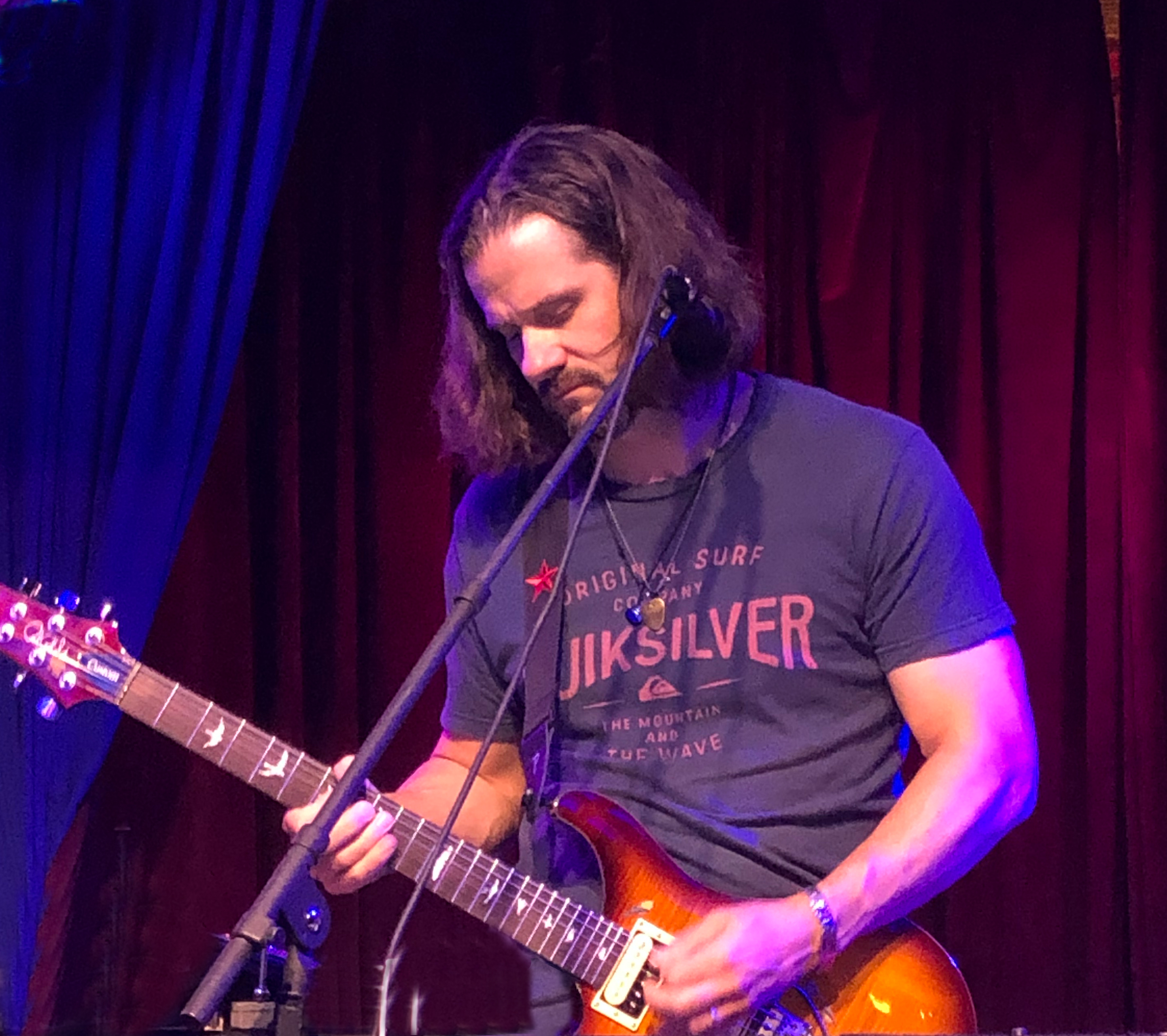
- Philip Stendek performing at House Of Blues, Las Vegas 2019 Photo: Kelli Birkett-Browne

Background information
- Also known as: Phil Stendek, Stendek, DJ Phil
- Born: Philip Richard Browne; Maplewood, Missouri, US
- Instrument(s): Drums, Guitar, Bass, Harmonica, Keyboards, Slide Whistle, Congas, Scottish Snare Drum
- Years active: 1987-present
- Spouse: Kelli Birkett-Browne (2018-present)
- Website: www.stendekmusic.com

Philip Richard Browne (born 1973), known as Philip Reilly Stendek, is an American musician, singer-songwriter, music educator, multi-instrumentalist, DJ, producer, and loop artist. He has been an artist-in-residence at House Of Blues, Las Vegas since 2003, and has played over 700 shows on its courtyard stage as of January 2025. He was frontman for St. Louis bands Celery and ResistAll from 1995 to 2002, and was a drummer in the St Louis Caledonian Pipe Band from 1987 to 2013. From 2000 to 2002, he ran the non-profit Musicians United For Furthering Youth (M.U.F.F.Y.), that provided music lessons to children in at-risk neighborhoods.

== Early life ==
Philip was born in Maplewood, a small town in St. Louis County, Missouri, in 1973, the third child of four to Mary Ellen (née Quinn), a secretary, and David Browne, a carpenter and OTR truck driver.

While attending St Mary's High School, Philip played drums in the school band, and eventually joined the snare drum section of the St Louis Caledonian Scottish Pipe Band.

== Musical career ==
From 1995 to 1999, Philip was guitarist/vocalist for pop-punk band Celery. After self-releasing two albums and going on three US tours, Philip quit the band to focus on starting Musicians United For Furthering Youth (M.U.F.F.Y.), a non-profit for teaching music to at-risk youth in North St. Louis. While running the organization, he formed the band ResistAll, which performed under various line-ups from 2000 to 2002.

In the spring of 2002, Philip wrote a batch of acoustic, singer-songwriter style songs, and with drummer Joe Meyer and Guitarist John Kiehne, embarked on a project called Stendek. When Joe and John lost interest in the project, Philip continued on as a solo act employing a pair of Loopstations to record a variety of musical instruments for accompaniment.

Over the course of his 20-year career, Philip has released 3 albums and 2 EPs, toured full-time from 2009 to 2012,

In 2003, Philip moved to Las Vegas, and became an artist-in-residence at House Of Blues.

Since 2007, Philip has been DJ-ing under the moniker "DJ Phil", and performs mostly at special events in Las Vegas.

In 2010, Philip won 1st place in the BOSS US Looping Championships in Hollywood, CA, followed by a 5th-place finish in the BOSS World Looping Championships in Anaheim, CA.

== Personal life ==
Philip is married to Kelli Birkett, and has 1 child. They live in Las Vegas.
