= Gutiérrez (magazine) =

Spanish satirical magazine (1927–1934)

- Editor: K-Hito
- Categories: Satirical magazine
- Frequency: Weekly
- Founded: 1927
- First issue: 7 May 1927
- Final issue Number: 29 September 1934; 374
- Country: Spain
- Based in: Madrid
- Language: Spanish

Gutiérrez was a Spanish weekly satirical magazine which was in circulation between 1927 and 1934 in Madrid, Spain. Its subtitle was semanario español de humorismo (Spanish: Spanish humor weekly). It was among the most read satirical magazines in the country during its lifetime in addition to Buen Humor.

== History and profile ==
Gutiérrez was first published on 7 May 1927. The magazine was published in Madrid on a weekly basis. The founding editor was K-Hito. Major contributors were Miguel Mihura, Enrique Jardiel Poncela, Edgar Neville and Antonio Lara de Gavilán. In June 1933 a short play entitled Eugenesia (Spanish: Eugenics) was featured in Gutiérrez. The magazine also reprinted cartoons produced by the Catalan artists, but these were introduced with some negative captions. It folded following the publication of the 374th issue dated 29 September 1934.
