= BCN Week =

Barcelona magazine

BCN Week is a cultural newsweekly started in 2006 by ex-pats in Barcelona. The English-language publication originally included a spattering of Spanish and Catalan words in otherwise purely English articles, reviews, recommendations, and event listings, but has since expanded to include articles in Catalan and Spanish. While its style is somewhat relaxed and irreverent, it also deals with real themes present in modern-day Barcelona. For example, construction of the new high-speed train link, to more cultural themes such as the creation of the first multicultural centre for the arts an NGO called Gracia Arts Project, connecting foreign and local art lovers.

BCN Week typically contains 24 pages with subdivisions of reviews, columns, and listings about current events occurring in Barcelona. The Shortlist section contains 5 critiques of local restaurants, bars, and shops. The opinion columns address subjects such as local politics, fiction, poetry, crimes, language, culture, and urban excursions. The listings cover special happenings during the month such as concerts, theatre, exhibitions, inaugurations, festivals, films, sales, special events, and conferences. The paper's creative writing section illustrates local talent and originality. Every edition contains a theme on its front page that the following content loosely addresses.

== Circulation and distribution ==
BCN Week currently has a circulation of 15,000 papers distributed throughout 500 locations in Barcelona. These locations include bars, shops, restaurants, art galleries, movie cinemas, clubs, schools, hostels, and civic centers.

In February 2010, BCN Week signed an agreement with the Universitat de Barcelona (UB) allowing BCN Week to distribute its paper in the UB's designated magazine racks in various campuses across the city.

== Operations ==
BCN Week is an independent paper that prints 11 times a year (skipping August). The magazine is distributed in the city of Barcelona in the areas of Gracia, Eixample, Raval, Sant Antoni, La Ribera, Poble Sec, Barrio Gótico, El Born, Barceloneta, and Poblenou.

== Collaborations ==
BCN Week has collaborated with The National Radio of Spain, The Association of DJs Contra la Fam, The Spanish Association for Free Press, Scanner FM, Mondosonoro, and Goorilo.

BCN Week’s print content can also be found for free, along with other original content, articles and reviews at www.bcnweek.com Users can view current and past editions at the website.
