= Antonio Lara de Gavilán =

Spanish graphic artist, editorial cartoonist and author of comic theatre

Antonio Lara de Gavilán (22 September 1896 – 4 January 1978), mostly known by his pen name Tono, was a Spanish graphic artist, editorial cartoonist and author of comic theatre. His work was strongly influenced by Ramón Gómez de la Serna, Ultraism and Surrealism.

Tono and Miguel Mihura worked for another satirical magazine entitled Gutiérrez which existed between 1927 and 1934. They were also among the contributors of La Ametralladora, a weekly satirical magazine published between 1937 and 1939 during the civil war by the Franco supporters. He also assisted Mihura in the establishment of another satirical magazine, La Codorniz, in 1941.
