= News magazine =

Magazine about current events

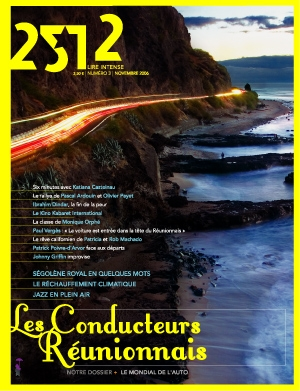
2512, a monthly news magazine published in Réunion

A news magazine is a typed, printed, and published magazine, radio, or television program, usually published weekly, consisting of articles about current events. News magazines generally discuss stories in greater depth than newspapers or newscasts do, and aim to give the consumer an understanding of the important events beyond the basic facts.

== Broadcast news magazines ==
Radio news magazines are similar to television news magazines. Unlike radio newscasts, which are typically about five minutes in length, radio news magazines can run from 30 minutes to three hours or more.

Television news magazines provide a similar service to print news magazines; unlike a conventional newscast, these programs feature long-form segments that allow more in-depth coverage of specific topics, including current affairs, investigations, major interviews, and human-interest stories. The BBC's Panorama was one of the earliest examples, premiering in 1953. In Canada, CTV premiered W5 in 1966, running for 58 seasons before being cancelled as a regular series in 2024 due to budget cuts by its parent company (with the brand repurposed for long-form stories on CTV News programming and platforms). It was the longest-running program of its kind in North America.

In the United States, the Big Three networks all currently produce at least one weekly news magazine, including ABC's 20/20, CBS's 60 Minutes and Sunday Morning, and NBC's Dateline NBC; of these programs, 60 Minutes typically focuses on investigative journalism, 20/20 and Dateline focus predominantly on true crime documentaries, while Sunday Morning typically focuses on human-interest stories (up to and including stories on the arts) and has a more relaxed tone.

News magazines proliferated on network schedules in the early 1990s, as they had lower production costs in comparison to scripted programs, and could attract equivalent if not larger audiences. At the same time, newer newsmagazines—including syndicated offerings such as A Current Affair, Hard Copy and Inside Edition—often had an infotainment skew with a larger focus on tabloid stories (including coverage of celebrities such as Michael Jackson, and the O.J. Simpson and Menendez brothers' murder trials), rather than the harder journalism associated with 60 Minutes and 20/20 at the time. CNN president Ed Turner argued that these shows had eclipsed the networks' evening newscasts as their flagship programs, at the expense of their news divisions' traditions of hard journalism.

By the late-1990s, Dateline would establish a niche in true crime to set it apart from its competitors—a format that would bolster its popularity, and lead the show to being on as many as five times per-week at its peak. To compete with 20/20 and Dateline, CBS premiered a Wednesday-night edition of 60 Minutes known as 60 Minutes II in 1999; the program was positioned as having a similar format to its Sunday counterpart (rather than having a tabloid-centric format), differentiated primarily by having a separate production team. NBC experimented with other news magazines in the 2010s, including Rock Center with Brian Williams—a more hard news-oriented program that aired for two seasons, and Sunday Night with Megyn Kelly—a short-lived primetime vehicle for the former Fox News correspondent. In 2025, CBS relaunched its weekday CBS Evening News with a more news magazine-like format, focusing on in-depth stories rather than summarizing top stories like its competitors.

Some local television stations in the U.S. have produced news magazines. Westinghouse Broadcasting created the Evening Magazine format for its stations, and syndicated it to other markets as PM Magazine; the program used a hybrid format mixing locally-produced segments with national content. These programs largely been displaced by cheaper programming acquired from the syndication market, but there have been exceptions such as WCVB-TV in Boston—which has continued to produce the nightly news magazine Chronicle since 1982, and Evening on KING-TV in Seattle—which originally premiered in 1986 as the local franchise of Evening Magazine.

In Brazil, TV Globo's Sunday-night news magazine Fantástico has historically been one of the top programs on Brazilian television, although its dominance is no longer as absolute as it was in the past due to competition from variety shows such as SBT's Programa Silvio Santos, and from Record's competing news magazine Domingo Espetacular.

== Notable print news magazines ==
Major news magazines
News magazine	Country of origin
Klan	Albania
Mapo	Albania
Noticias	Argentina
CartaCapital	Brazil
Época	Brazil
IstoÉ	Brazil
Veja	Brazil
L'actualité	Canada
Maclean's	Canada
Semana	Colombia
Visión	Colombia
Týden	Czech Republic
Respekt	Czech Republic
Suomen Kuvalehti	Finland
L'Express	France
Marianne	France
L'Obs	France
Le Point	France
Der Spiegel	Germany
Stern	Germany
Focus	Germany
Yazhou Zhoukan	Hong Kong
Frontline	India
India Today	India
The Week	India
Outlook	India
Tehelka	India
HardNews	India
The Northeast Today	India
Shraman Bharti	India
Gatra	Indonesia
Tempo	Indonesia
L'Espresso	Italy
Famiglia Cristiana	Italy
Panorama	Italy
Proceso	Mexico
Zeta	Mexico
HP/De Tijd	Netherlands
Elsevier Weekblad	Netherlands
De Groene Amsterdammer	Netherlands
Nieuwe Revu	Netherlands
Vrij Nederland	Netherlands
Newswatch	Nigeria
Morgenbladet	Norway
Caretas	Peru
Polityka	Poland
Visão	Portugal
Ogoniok	Russia
The New Times	Russia
NIN	Serbia
Nedeljnik	Serbia
Novi magazin	Serbia
Mladina	Slovenia
Finweek	South Africa
Noseweek	South Africa
The Chosun Ilbo	South Korea
Fokus	Sweden
Korrespondent	Ukraine
The Economist	United Kingdom
New Statesman	United Kingdom
The Spectator	United Kingdom
The Week	United Kingdom
Bloomberg Businessweek	United States
The Atlantic	United States
The New Yorker	United States
The Nation	United States
Mother Jones	United States
National Review	United States
The New Republic	United States
Newsweek	United States
Time	United States
U.S. News & World Report	United States
World	United States
Zeta	Venezuela

== Notable TV news magazines ==
=== Australia ===
- Four Corners
- Dateline
- 60 Minutes
- Revealed
- Sunday Night

=== Canada ===
- 16×9
- The Fifth Estate
- Global Sunday
- This Hour Has Seven Days
- W5

=== Italy ===
- AnnoZero
- Ballarò
- In ½ h
- L'Infedele
- Porta a Porta

=== Mexico ===
- Noticieros Televisa
- On Air. with Paola Rojas
- The News with Karla Iberia Sánchez
- On Point. with Denise Maerker

=== Philippines ===
- Magandang Gabi... Bayan
- Pareng Partners
- Probe
- Reporter's Notebook
- Kapuso Mo, Jessica Soho
- KBYN: Kaagapay ng Bayan
- Kuha Mo!
- Rated Korina
- Tao Po!

=== United Kingdom ===
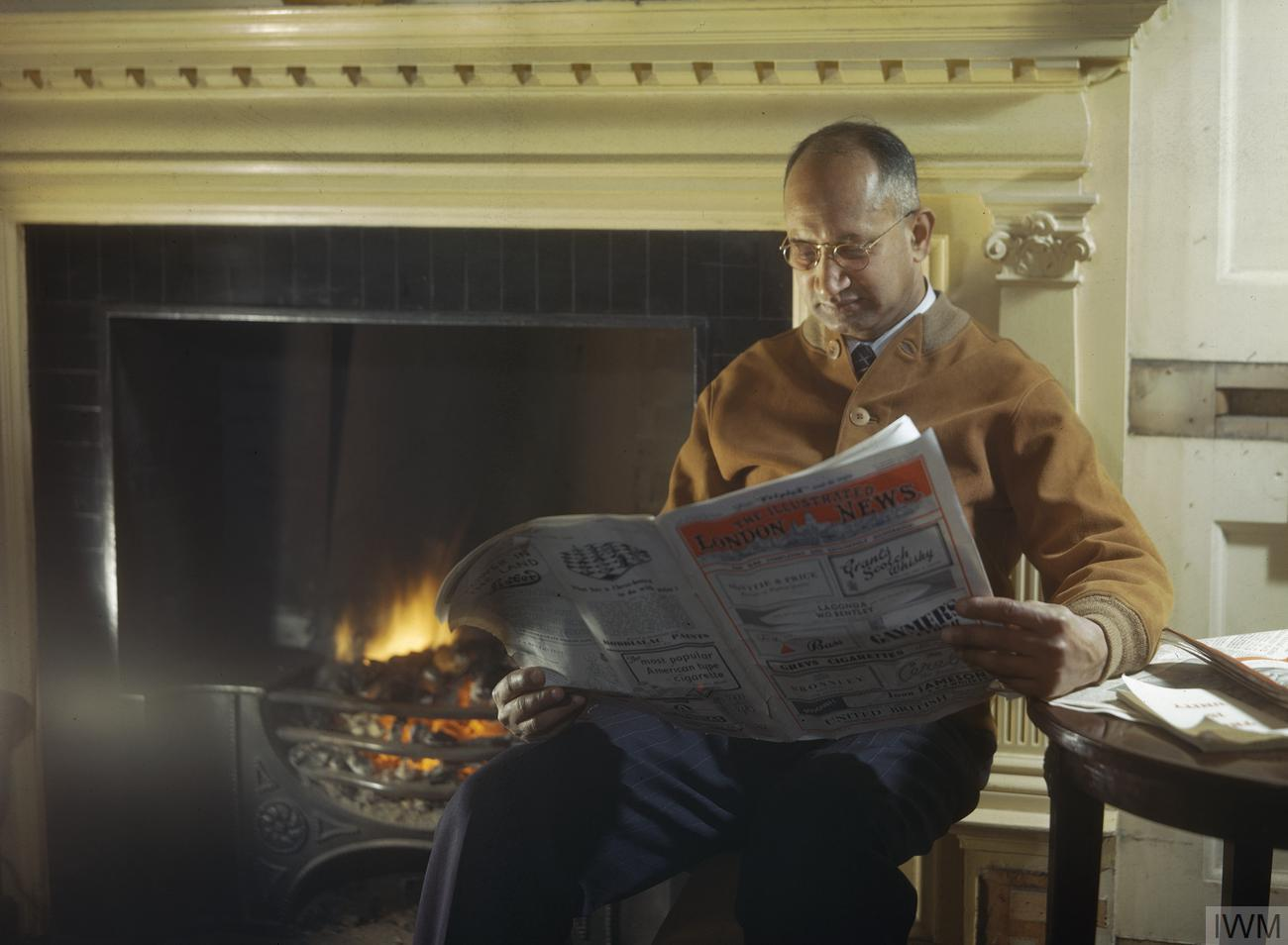
A man reading The Illustrated London News, 1944

- Dispatches
- Exposure
- The Illustrated London News
- Newsnight
- On Assignment
- Panorama
- Tonight
- Unreported World

=== United States ===
- 20/20
- 60 Minutes
- 60 Minutes II
- 48 Hours
- Al Rojo Vivo (2002 TV program)
- America Now
- America's Heartland
- Aquí y Ahora
- Bill Moyers Journal
- Business Nation
- CBS News Sunday Morning
- Connie Chung Tonight
- Dateline NBC
- Day One
- E:60
- Expose
- Eye to Eye with Connie Chung
- Frontline
- Inside Edition
- InvestigateTV
- Now on PBS
- Now with Tom Brokaw and Katie Couric
- Primer Impacto
- Primetime
- Public Eye with Bryant Gumbel
- Real Life with Jane Pauley
- Rock Center with Brian Williams
- Saturday Night with Connie Chung
- Small Town Big Deal
- Sunday Night with Megyn Kelly
- Turning Point
- Weekend

=== Other countries ===
- Brazil
  - Domingo Espetacular
  - Fantástico
- Bulgaria
  - Panorama
  - Vsyaka nedelya
- Chile
  - Contacto
  - Informe especial
- Hong Kong
  - News Magazine (新聞透視)
  - Sunday Report (星期日檔案)
- Spain
  - BCN Week
  - Informe Semanal
- European Journal (Belgium/Germany)
- Kastljós (Iceland)
- Mladina (Slovenia)
- Provjereno (Croatia)
- Séptimo día (Colombia)
- Tagesthemen (Germany)
- On the Spot (Indonesia)
- Jor Morning News (จ้อข่าวเช้า) (Thailand)

== Notable radio news magazines ==
=== International ===
- Newshour

=== Australia ===
- AM
- RN Breakfast
- PM
- The World Today

=== Canada ===
- Canada Live
- The Current
- The World at Six

=== Mexico ===
- W noticias (XEW-AM)
- El Heraldo Radio

=== United Kingdom ===
- Breakfast (BBC Radio 5 Live)
- Broadcasting House
- PM
- Today
- The World at One
- The World This Weekend
- The World Tonight
- Worricker on Sunday (Five Live)

=== United States ===
- All Things Considered
- America in The Morning
- Eye on the World
- Morning Edition (weekend version branded as Weekend Edition)
- This Morning, America's First News with Gordon Deal
- Weekend America
- The World

== See also ==
- News program
- News media
