= Popular 1 Magazine =

Spanish music magazine

Rock and Roll Popular 1
- Editor: Cesar Martin
- Categories: Music
- Frequency: Monthly
- Founded: 1973
- Company: B&J Editores
- Based in: Barcelona, Spain
- Language: Spanish
- Website: popular1.com

Rock and Roll Popular 1 Magazine is a Spanish music magazine based in Barcelona, operating since 1973.

== History ==
Popular 1 was founded in Barcelona in 1973 by artist José Luis Martín Frías (Martin J. Louis) and his wife Bertha M. Yebra. In those years of the Francoist State culture, specially Rock music, was something restricted by the State. The magazine was a musical reference in the mid seventies, covering international tours of bands like Pink Floyd, Lou Reed or Queen and the success of Spanish singers like Nino Bravo.

Spanish Pop artists like Alaska and Loquillo worked in the magazine during the 1980s. Other contributors include Spanish journalists Jordi Sierra i Fabra, Julían Ruíz, Mariano Muniesa had collaborated in different periods of Popular 1 in the last four decades.

During the 1990s the magazine covered the Grunge Era and specially the career of L.A bands like Guns N' Roses, Mötley Crüe and Jane's Addiction. Also Kiss, since their reunion in 1996, had appeared in the front cover of the magazine regularly.

== Today ==
Rock and Roll Popular 1 is still published on a monthly basis. In 2013 they celebrate their forty Anniversary becoming one of the oldest music publications in Europe.

Magazine founder José Luis Martín Frías is known for his friendship with artist Salvador Dalí and his career as a rock photographer. Today he still exhibits in US, Russia and Spain.

== See also ==
- List of magazines in Spain
