= Mundo Hispánico =

Spanish cultural and political magazine (1948–1977)

- Categories: Cultural magazine; Political magazine
- Frequency: Monthly
- Founded: 1948
- First issue: February 1948
- Final issue Number: December 1977; 357
- Country: Spain
- Based in: Madrid
- Language: Spanish

Mundo Hispánico (Spanish: Hispanic World) was a monthly cultural and political magazine which existed between 1948 and 1977. The subtitle of the magazine was La revista de veintitrés países (Spanish: The Twenty-Three Country Magazine) which indicated the fact that it did not only target readers in Spain, but also those in Latin America. It was one of the publications which supported the Francoist rule.

== History and profile ==
Mundo Hispánico was launched in Madrid in February 1948. Alfredo Sánchez Bella was the founder of the magazine which was published by the Institute of Hispanic Culture (IHC). It was the second publication launched by the IHC. Its format was large, and the magazine contained full-colour photographs. Mundo Hispánico folded in December 1977 after the publication of its 357th issue.

== Contributors and content ==
Major contributors of Mundo Hispánico included Tono, Miguel Mihura, López Rubio, Estebita, Máximo, Cebrián, Mena, Munoa, Picazo, Chumy Chúmez, Cesc, Luis Medrano and Zeus. Enrique Herreros worked for the magazine being responsible for the selection of the drawings.

Frequent topics featured in Mundo Hispánico were Spain’s colonial past, classical and contemporary Spanish art and architecture, technical innovations, Spanish cinema and fashion and bullfighting. It published special issues for the leading figures of the Spanish cultural tradition such as the painter Francisco Goya. In addition, Mundo Hispánico responded the negative reports and comments about Spain by the US magazines such as Life.
