= Nuestro Tiempo (magazine) =

Bimonthly current affairs magazine in Spain

- Categories: Political magazine
- Frequency: Bimonthly; Quarterly
- Publisher: Servicio de Publicaciones
- Founder: Antonio Fontán
- Founded: 1954
- Country: Spain
- Based in: Madrid; Pamplona
- Language: Spanish
- Website: Nuestro Tiempo
- ISSN: 0029-5795
- OCLC: 949768804

Nuestro Tiempo (Spanish: Our Time) is a political and cultural magazine which has been published since 1954 in Spain.

== History and profile ==
Nuestro Tiempo was launched by Antonio Fontán in Madrid in 1954. In 1958 the headquarters moved to Pamplona when Fontán was appointed dean of the Institute of Journalism at University of Navarra. It is published on a quarterly basis by Servicio de Publicaciones based in the University of Navarra. It first came out monthly, and then its frequency was switched to bimonthly. During the Franco era its publisher was Ediciones Rialp which was owned by Opus Dei. The magazine covers articles on politics, literature, pedagogy, economics, philosophy, international relations and literary work, including interview, essay, poetry.

Nuestro Tiempo is the recipient of various awards from the Spanish chapter of the Society for News Design (SND). It was also awarded two Bravo prizes by the European Economic Community.
