= Inversión y Finanzas =

Weekly business magazine based in Madrid, Spain

Inversión y Finanzas is a weekly Spanish finance and business magazine published in Madrid, Spain.

== Profile ==
Inversión y Finanzas was launched in 1993. It is part of Grupo Vocento and is published by Invensor Ediciones S.L. on a weekly basis. Its headquarters is in Madrid. The magazine features articles on economy and stock market.

Inversión y Finanzas had a circulation of 8,300 copies in 2012. In 2014 the circulation of the magazine was 4,641 copies.
