= El Propagador de la libertad =

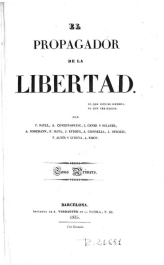
Front Cover of the magazine "El Propagador de la libertad"

El Propagador de la libertad was a political magazine written in Spanish that was published in Barcelona from October 1835 until 1838. It did not have a fixed regularity regarding the publication, but in general one number was published every month. The main editor was Francesc Raüll. It was printed in the printing house Jacint Verdaguer until 1836 and later on, in the printing house Ignasi Estivill. Each number had 30-40 pages and a measurement of 23 cm.

== Themes and collaborators ==
The magazine’s objective was to extend widely among rural people the ideas and the liberal institutions. Moreover, it wanted to spread some notions about Legislation, History, technical discoveries and Geography. Furthermore, it disseminated a certain utopian socialism influenced by Saint-Simon. Another theme was Literature and this magazine is one of the few samples from the liberal Catalan Romanticism. “El Propagador de la libertad” defended the social function of literature and it fight against Classicism like a movement that had been overcome. It spread the works of Alexandre Dumas, Victor Hugo and Heine.

The collaborators of the magazine were A. Fontcuberta, Pere Mata, F. Altés i Gurena, A. Ribot, Gener i Solanes, Antoni Gironella, J. Eydoux and J. Strozzi. This staff changed as a consequence of the revolutionary successes from 1836 because a lot of the writers were arrested and exiled. As a result, A. Fontcuberta, who used the pseudonym of Josep Andreu Covert-Spring started directing the magazine. Some of the collaborators changed too and in this period we can find Pau Piferrer, Manuel Milà i Fontanals and Joaquim M. Bover.

The objective of spreading the new ideas among the farmers was not achieved due to the high intellectual level of the magazine, which was a barrier for this social group. At the end, “El Propagador de la libertad” was one of the most important literary, cultural and scientific magazines of its period due to its connections with the progressive current of thought.
