= Virolet =

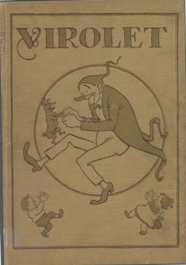
Front cover from the magazine "Virolet"

Virolet was a children's weekly magazine that was first published in January 1922 as a supplement of the magazine En Patufet. The main writer and the administrator of the magazine was Cardenal Casañas. It was edited by the same editing company as En Patufet, the book shop Josep Bagunyà. Regarding the format of the magazine, the number had 8 pages with a measurement of 300x210 mm. it was printed in the house E. I J. Solà based in Valencia Street 200 in Barcelona. Nonetheless, from the year 1924, it started being printed in a printing house from Josep Bagunyà in the Muntaner Street. The subscription cost 5,50 pesetas and one number cost 0,10 pesetas.

“Virolet” disappeared on 3 January 1931, 9 years later from its beginnings, with a total of 469 numbers published. Its disappearance coincided with the birth of another children's magazine from the same company as En Patufet called Esquitx.

== Themes and collaborators ==
The magazine was dedicated to young children. In it, there were a lot of texts with drawings, short stories and jokes. Moreover, there were adaptations of the most famous stories from World Literature very well illustrated.

Among the collaborators we find Josep Carner, Apel•les Mestres, Joaquim Ruyra, Martínez i Ferrando, Carles Soldevila, Clovis Eimeric and Josep Maria Folch i Torres, among others. Furthermore, there were illustrators like Junceda i Cornet, Lola Anglada, Josep Serra i Massana, etc.
