= European Vibe =

- Editor: Luc Ciotkowski, Tomek Solarski
- Categories: Lifestyle
- Frequency: Monthly
- Circulation: 20,000
- Publisher: European Vibe Entertainment S.L
- First issue: September 2006
- Company: European Vibe Entertainment S.L
- Country: Spain
- Based in: Madrid
- Language: English
- Website: European Vibe

European Vibe was a popular free monthly magazine published in Madrid. It where the first full colour English language magazine published in Madrid and it was first published in September 2006. The magazine closed in January 2011.

The magazine contained music, film, sports, travel, Spanish culture and Madrid-focused sections alongside a Spanish-language learning section for the international community in Madrid.

European Vibe's music, or "vibes" section has featured interviews with numerous artists, including Madonna, Craig David, Paul 'Bonehead' Arthurs (ex-Oasis), Javier Weyler (Stereophonics), Chambao, Shout Out Louds, The Raveonettes, La Quinta Estación, Joe Wilson (ex-Sneaker Pimps), Kaiser Chiefs, The Feeling, Eliades Ochoa (Buena Vista Social Club), Russell Simmons and Joseph Simmons (a.k.a. Rev Run, ex-Run DMC), Wyclef Jean, Guillemots, Zia McCabe (The Dandy Warhols), Stonebridge, The Sounds and Dru Hill.

The June 2007 edition contained an article by Peter Moore on the Botellon culture in Spain. The article described this act of drinking in the streets during the night time in Spain and how for many young Spanish people the act is far more representative of Spanish interests than bullfighting or flamenco. The article was translated into Spanish by the 20 minutos daily newspaper on 18 June and in the following days the story was carried in most leading Spanish newspapers and radio stations, including a live interview on Spanish radio station Cadena Ser with the magazine's Managing Director Scott Edwards.

== Sources ==
- Ozu report Botellon Article
- Spanish portal covers European Vibe Magazine Article
- European Vibe Bonehead interview
