= SP (magazine) =

News and political magazine in Spain (1957–1972)

- Former editors: Rodrigo Royo (1941–1967); Luis Ángel de la Viuda (1967–1968)
- Categories: News magazine; Political magazine
- Frequency: Weekly
- Founded: 1957
- First issue: 12 May 1957
- Final issue: 1972
- Country: Spain
- Based in: Madrid; Barcelona
- Language: Spanish

SP was an illustrated news and political magazine which was published in Spain from 1957 to 1972. The title was an abbreviation of the phrase Su Periódico (Spanish: Your Periodical). It is known for its support for Francoist rule.

== History and profile ==
SP was launched in 1957 by a group of Spanish journalists, including Rodrigo Royo and Jaime Menéndez. Its first issue appeared on 12 May that year. The magazine came out weekly, and its editor-in-chief and director was Rodrigo Royo. In September 1967 Luis Ángel de la Viuda replaced Royo as the editor-in-chief of SP and held the post until November 1968. The headquarters of the magazine was in Madrid, but it also had publishing offices in Barcelona. Due to its popularity a sister publication, Daily SP, was started in 1967 which ceased publication in 1969 due to lower popularity. SP sold 21,000 copies a week in the years 1966, 1967 and 1969. Its 1968 circulation was 24,000 copies.

In 1961 during the trial of Adolf Eichmann, a Nazi official who escaped to Argentine where he was captured, SP published an article in which the holocaust was denied. The article claimed that not Nazis but the Russians established the concentration camps for Jews in Germany. The editor-in-chief, Rodrigo Royo, also published an editorial denying the existence of the gas chambers stating that these were just the army laboratories established to test the gas masks of the soldiers.

In January 1964 SP published a controversial article about the assassination of the American President John F. Kennedy arguing that the murderers were the Dallas police. A CIA document created upon this article on 14 May 1964 stated that the magazine was a Falange supporter and that it might have links with the Italian far right publication Secolo XX. In the same document it was also speculated that this article was part of the Franco government's attempts to rebuild diplomatic relations with Mexico.

SP folded in 1972.
