= Ibérica (magazine) =

Popular science magazine in Spain (1914–2004)

- Editor-in-chief: Ricardo Cirera (1914–1917); Josep Albiñana (1917–1922); Andrés F. Linari (1922–1936); Ignacio Puig (1945–1961); Pascual Bolufer (1962–2004)
- Categories: Popular science magazine
- Frequency: Biweekly (1914–1936); Weekly (1945–1962); Monthly (1962–2004)
- Founder: Society of Jesus
- Founded: 1914
- First issue: January 11914
- Final issue: November–December 2004
- Country: Spain
- Based in: Barcelona
- Language: Spanish
- ISSN: 0211-0776

Ibérica was a popular science magazine which was based in Barcelona, Spain, between 1914 and 2004 with some interruptions. Its subtitle was changed throughout its existence, and one of them was El progreso de las Ciencias y de sus aplicaciones. Revista Semanal (Spanish: The progress of sciences and their applications. Weekly magazine). The magazine was one of the most significant periodicals in the pre-civil war period.

== History and profile ==
Ibérica was established in 1914 as a biweekly magazine, and its first issue appeared in January that year. Its founders were the members of the Society of Jesus who were working at the Ebro Observatory. They were led by Ricardo Cirera who was also the founder of the observatory. The title of the magazine was a reference to the Ebro river near the observatory based in Roquetes, Tarragona.

Ibérica aimed at making scientific and technological knowledge much more familiar among laymen and fostering scientific progress. First it was published in the printing facilities at the observatory. Then a publishing house based in Tortosa, Imprenta Moderna de Algueró y Baiges, became its publisher. Ricardo Cirera edited the magazine until 1917 when he was replaced by Josep Albiñana in the post. Following the death of Josep Albiñana in 1922 the Argentinian Jesuit Andrés F. Linari was appointed editor-in-chief of Ibérica. Under Linari's editorship the magazine's headquarters was moved to Barcelona in 1925.

Ibérica provided scientific articles accompanied with the good quality illustrations. Its contributors were both Jesuits and non-Jesuits. From its start in 1914 to 1925 the magazine had the following sections: scientific chronicle covering news on inventions and new applications, scientific bulletin dealing with the scientific theories and bibliographical section containing book reviews. The frequent topics featured in the main section included the devices used at the observatory, including refracting telescope, seismology, and electrotechnics. The magazine sold 10,000 copies in the mid-1920s. It folded at the beginning of the civil war on 11 July 1936.

Ibérica was restarted following the end of World War II in 1945 and appeared until December 2004. Ignacio Puig was its editor-in-chief from 1945 to 1961. Its major contributors were those working at different observatories in Spain and abroad and scientists, including Miquel Crusafont, Ignasi Sala de Castellarnau, and Ramon Margalef. Common topics covered in the magazine were semiconductors, transistors and televisions.

In 1962 Pascual Bolufer was appointed director of the magazine. Under his editorship the subtitle of the magazine was redesigned as Actualidad científica (Spanish: Latest scientific developments). It was published on a weekly basis between 1945 and 1962, but later its frequency was switched to monthly.
