= La Traca =

Spanish satirical magazine (1884–1939)

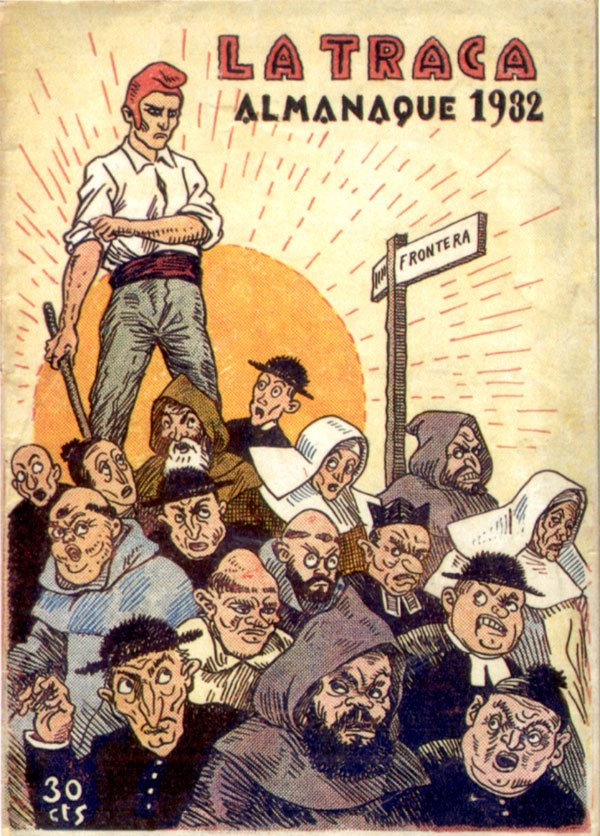
- Cover page dated 1932
- Categories: Satirical magazine
- Frequency: Weekly
- Founder: Manuel Lluch Soler; Luis Cebrian Mezquita
- Founded: 1884
- Final issue: 1939
- Country: Spain
- Based in: Valencia
- Language: Catalan; Spanish

La Traca (Spanish: The Firecracker) was a satirical weekly magazine which was headquartered in Valencia, Spain. It existed in two periods between 1884 and 1892 and between 1909 and 1939. The magazine sold half a million copies making it the first satirical magazines with this circulation in Spain. Its record was broken in the late 1976 when Interviú sold one million copies.

== History and profile ==
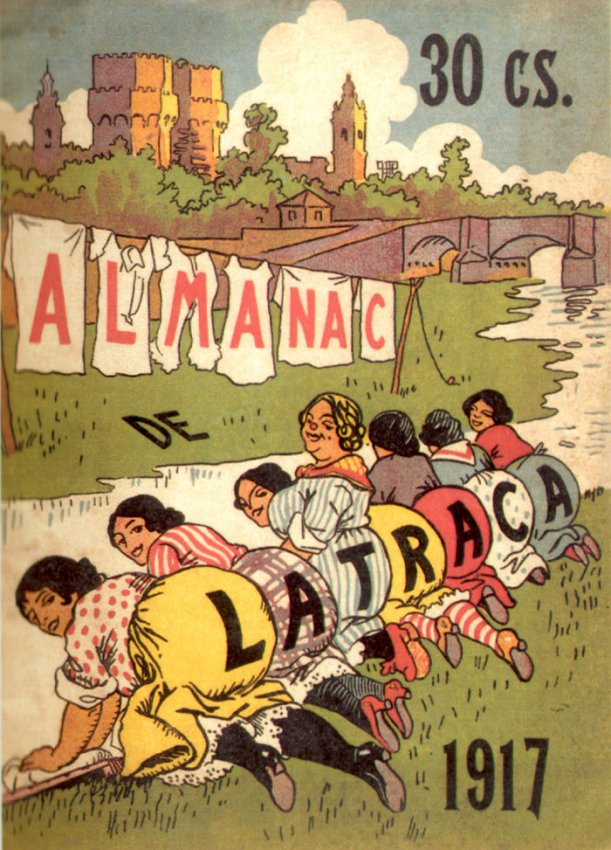
Cover page of La Traca (1917)

La Traca was launched in 1884. Its founders were Manuel Lluch Soler and Luis Cebrian Mezquita. It came out weekly and was based in Valencia. It held a republican political stance. The magazine was folded in 1892 and was restarted by Vicente Miguel Carceller in 1909. It was subject to frequent censorship during its existence and was permanently closed in 1939. The reason for its closure was the publication of the caricatures of the Fascist dictator Francisco Franco. Its editor Vicente Miguel Carceller was arrested due to these caricatures and hanged in June 1940 due to his anti-Fascist leaning.

The magazine featured satirical material written in the Valencian dialect. In 1931 the language of the magazine was switched to Spanish after which it sold more than half a million copies. One of the contributors of La Traca was the illustrator Gaspar Méndez Álvarez whose anticlerical and political writings were published from 1928.
