= Stendek (magazine) =

Stendek was a Spanish language magazine dedicated to UFOs and the paranormal, published by Centro de Estudios Interplanetarios (CEI) between 1970 and 1981 in Barcelona. The editor was Joan Crexells.

== See also ==
- List of magazines in Spain
