= Intramuros (journal) =

- Discipline: Biography and autobiography
- Language: Spanish
- Edited by: Beltrán Gambier and María Sheila Cremaschi

Publication details
- History: 1994; 31 years ago
- Publisher: Beltrán Gambier and María Sheila Cremaschi (Spain)
- Frequency: Biannually

Standard abbreviations
- ISO 4: Intramuros

Links
- Journal homepage

Intramuros is a literary review dedicated to biography, autobiography and the memory genre, with half-yearly frequency. The review collaborates with European cultural institutions like Eunic Spain (National Institutes of culture of UE), Cultural Italian Institute of Madrid, and Goethe Institute of Madrid. Moreover, it participates in the Erasmus Placement programme and Leonardo da Vinci programme, which belong to the European Community.

== History ==
The review was instituted in Buenos Aires in 1994, by Beltrán Gambier and María Sheila Cremaschi.

== Editorial line ==
The first numbers of Intramuros were dedicated to the "Minimal autobiography" question. Then, in a second time, Intramuros worked about cultural bridge Madrid/Buenos Aires. Actually, the review edits monographic numbers dedicated to countries and cities such as (Berlin, Germany, Italy, France, Israel, Argentina, Greece, Egypt and Turkey). The last number, ♯31, was dedicated to the 20th anniversary commemoration of the fall of the Berlin Wall.

== Review summaries ==
- Summary of number 1
- Summary of number 2 Archived 11 July 2011 at the Wayback Machine
- Summary of number 3 Archived 11 July 2011 at the Wayback Machine
- Summary of number 4 Archived 11 July 2011 at the Wayback Machine
- Summary of number 5 Archived 11 July 2011 at the Wayback Machine
- Summary of number 6 Archived 14 December 2010 at the Wayback Machine
- Summary of number 7 Archived 11 July 2011 at the Wayback Machine
- Summary of number 8 Archived 14 May 2011 at the Wayback Machine
- Summary of number 9 Archived 11 July 2011 at the Wayback Machine
- Summary of number 10 Archived 11 July 2011 at the Wayback Machine
- Summary of number 11 Archived 11 July 2011 at the Wayback Machine
- Summary of number 12 Archived 11 July 2011 at the Wayback Machine
- Summary of number 13 Archived 20 January 2011 at the Wayback Machine
- Summary of number 14 Archived 11 July 2011 at the Wayback Machine
- Summary of number 15 Archived 11 July 2011 at the Wayback Machine
- Summary of number 16-17 (Berlin) Archived 11 July 2011 at the Wayback Machine
- Summary of number 18-19 (Alemania) Archived 11 July 2011 at the Wayback Machine
- Summary of number 20 (Italia) Archived 11 July 2011 at the Wayback Machine
- Summary of number 21 (Italia) Archived 11 July 2011 at the Wayback Machine
- Summary of number 22 (France) Archived 11 April 2011 at the Wayback Machine
- Summary of number 23 (Israel) Archived 11 July 2011 at the Wayback Machine
- Summary of number 24 (French-speaking world) Archived 11 July 2011 at the Wayback Machine
- Summary of number 25 (Argentina) Archived 11 July 2011 at the Wayback Machine
- Summary of number 26 (Morocco) Archived 11 July 2011 at the Wayback Machine
- Summary of number 27 (Greece) Archived 11 July 2011 at the Wayback Machine
- Summary of number 28 (Egypt) Archived 11 July 2011 at the Wayback Machine
- Summary of number 29 (Turkey) Archived 11 July 2011 at the Wayback Machine
- Summary of number 30 (Minimal autobiography) Archived 11 July 2011 at the Wayback Machine

== See also ==
- List of magazines in Spain
