= Meridià =

Former Catalan magazine

- Editor: A. Fuster Valldeperas (director); Joan Merlí (head of edition)
- Frequency: Weekly
- Country: Spain
- Language: Catalan
- Website: https://arca.bnc.cat/arcabib_pro/en/inicio/inicio.do

Meridià was a Catalan magazine published every week and directed by A. Fuster Valldeperas. The first issue was published 14 January 1938, and it was published more than fifty times until 14 January 1939. The historical context is the Spanish Civil War that took place from 1936 until 1939.

The magazine had 8 pages with 4 columns and it had a measurement of 500×350 mm. It was printed in Clarassó, situated in the Street Villarroel 17 of Barcelona and it had the editorial office in Passeig de Gràcia 19 bis in the same city. Each number cost fifty cents of peseta.

== Theme and collaborators ==
The themes of the magazine were politics, art and literature. It had a subtitle that showed that the people doing it were against the fascism and that they were intellectuals. Meridià tried to maintain the prestige of a previous magazine called Mirador.

The influence of the political party PSUC was very important in the direction of the magazine. Nevertheless, there was a certain eclecticism in the direction and the collaboration of Meridià. Its pages contained a great diversity of topics of a great variety of s\tyles. The magazine had an amazing quality with a lot of photos and images that illustrated all the works that were published in it. Moreover, it had an excellent typographic disposition.

The articles were divided into different groups that were Collaboration, Politics, Arts, Literature, Shows and Humor. The editors of the magazine were Sebastià Gash, Domènec Guansé, Lluís Montanyà, Joan Oliver, J. Roure-Torrent, M. Serra i Moret, Manuel Valldeperes and the head of edition was Joan Merlí. Later on, this team changed a little bit due to the historical circumstances of the moment.

The usual collaboration of Meridià was very extensive. We find essays and works of Pere Quart, Pau Balcells, Joan Comorera, Joan Peiró, Avel·lí Artís-Gener, Francesc Trabal, Antoni Rovira i Virgili, Rafael Tasis i Marca, M. Serra i Moret, C.A. Jordana, Jaume Serra Hunter, Felip Barjau, Josep Sol, among many others. The artistic part was done by famous drawers like Tísner, Apa, Arteche, Viader, Martí Bas, Calders, etcetera.

The literary importance of Meridià is quite remarkable and it is a wonderful historical source from the difficult period of time in which it was published.
