= Andaina =

Galician feminist magazine in Spain

- Categories: Women's magazine
- First issue: 1983
- Country: Galicia, Spain
- Based in: Santiago de Compostela
- Language: Galician
- Website: Andaina
- ISSN: 2483-6346
- OCLC: 436551242

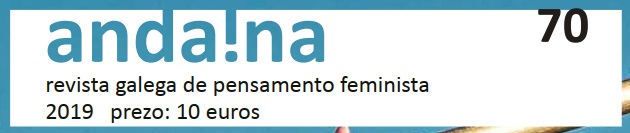

Andaina is a feminist magazine published in Santiago de Compostela, Galicia, Spain. The magazine was launched in 1983. Its subtitle is Revista galega de pensamento feminista. The magazine is published in Galician language and covers feminist themes. It also publishes interviews with leading female figures.

In March 2021 thirteen issues of Andaina covering the period of 1999–2003 were digitized by the University of Barcelona.
