= Rosa Maria Malet =

Spanish art historian (born 1948)

Rosa Maria Malet i Ybern (born 1948) is an art historian who directed the Fundació Joan Miró in Barcelona from 1980 until she retired in 2017.

== Biography ==
She was born in Badalona. In 1975 she graduated in Philosophy and Letters, specializing in Art History at the University of Barcelona. She discovered the work of Joan Miró in 1968, during the exhibition of his work that took place at the Hospital de la Santa Creu in Barcelona. She began working at the Fundació Joan Miró in the same year of its creation, in 1975, as a curator's assistant, and shortly afterwards as curator. She registered the works of the Foundation's funds. At Joan Miró's house, she worked on the arrangement and registration of the collection of graphic works that the artist had intended for his heirs. In 1980 she became the Director of the Foundation.

In 2016, she was awarded for her professional career by the Association of Museologists of Catalonia. She is a member of the ADOM Committee (Association pour la Défense de l'Oeuvre de Miró) and, as such, responsible for issuing certificates of authenticity for Miró's graphic work.

Her work at the head of the Joan Miró Foundation was recognized in March 2017 by the French government, which awarded her with the insignia of Knight of the National Order of Merit, one of the most important distinctions granted in France to people of anywhere in the world that have stood out for their work in any field. In the case of Malet, this recognition was granted to him for her work in favour of contemporary art and the dissemination of the French language and culture.

In 2018 she received the Creu de Sant Jordi from the Catalan Government "as dean in the direction of the Barcelona museums".

== Publications ==
- Joan Miró, Edicions Polígrafa, Barcelona (1983). Reedició 2003.
- Obra de Joan Miró, Editor Fundació Joan Miró, Barcelona (1988)
- Joan Miró. Una biografia, Col·lecció Pere Vergés de biografies, Edicions 62, Barcelona (1992)
- Joan Miró. Apunts d'una col·lecció (K. AG Gallery works), Fundació Joan Miró, Barcelona (2003)
- Joan Miró. Au-delà de la peinture, Fondation Marguerite et Aimé Maeght éditeur, Saint-Paul de Vence (2019)

== Exhibits ==
She has organized several exhibitions on Joan Miró, among others:

- Joan Miró. 1893-1993. Fundació Joan Miró, Barcelona (1993)
- Miró en escena, Fundació Joan Miró, Barcelona (1994-95)
- Joan Miró: equilibri a l'espai, Fundació Joan Miró, Barcelona (1997)
- Joan Miró. Sentiment, emoció, gest, Fundació Joan Miró, Barcelona (2006-07)

As well as exhibitions related to contemporary art, among others:

- Marcel Duchamp, Fundació Joan Miró, Barcelona (1984)
- Peter Greenaway. L’aventura d’Ícar, Fundació Joan Miró, Barcelona (1997)
- Mark Rothko, Fundació Joan Miró, Barcelona (2001)
- Vermell apart. Art contemporani xinès, Fundació Joan Miró, Barcelona (2008)
