= Hairstyles (magazine) =

Hairdressing magazine

- International edition cover
- Editor: Juan Prat
- Categories: Professional hairdressing magazine
- Frequency: Monthly
- Publisher: Ediciones Prensa y Video, Barcelona
- First issue: February 1969
- Country: Spain
- Based in: Barcelona, Catalonia
- Language: Spanish, English, Italian, French, Serbian, Turkish

Hairstyles is a title used for international editions of a professional hairdressing magazine originally published in Barcelona, Catalonia, Spain, under the name Peluquerias.

Peluquerias is a monthly magazine that has been published since February 1969. Among other licensed editions, the Serbian edition named Hairstyles na srpskom has been published since June 2002 as a bimonthly edition.

As of 2009, under the name Hairstyles, there are local editions in Serbia, Argentina, Italy and Turkey. Beside that, in past there were editions in Mexico, Dominican Republic and Croatia, but they ended with their publishing.
