= La Ametralladora (magazine) =

Spanish satirical magazine (1937–1939)

- Editor: Miguel Mihura
- Categories: Satirical magazine
- Frequency: Weekly
- Founded: 1937
- Final issue: 1939
- Country: Spain
- Language: Spanish

La Ametralladora (Spanish: Machine Gun) was a weekly satirical magazine which was published in Spain during the period 1937–1939. It was distributed to the nationalists fighting in the civil war.

== History and profile ==
La Ametralladora was established in 1937. The magazine was produced during the civil war and addressed the nationalist fighters. They were supporters of Francisco Franco, future Fascist ruler of Spain. Miguel Mihura edited the magazine which came out weekly. Tono, pseudonym of Antonio Lara de Gavilán, also contributed to the magazine.

Its competitor was L'Esquella de la Torratxa which was the organ of the republicans. La Ametralladora ceased publication in 1939 when the civil war ended and was succeeded by another satirical magazine La Codorniz.
