= Medina (magazine) =

Weekly women's magazine in Spain (1941–1945)

- Categories: Women's magazine
- Frequency: Weekly
- Publisher: Servicio de Prensa y Propaganda
- Founded: 1941
- First issue: 20 March 1941
- Final issue: 30 December 1945
- Company: Sección Femenina
- Country: Spain
- Based in: Madrid
- Language: Spanish
- ISSN: 1887-7354
- OCLC: 436636100

Medina was a weekly women's magazine which was in circulation in the period 1941–1945 in Madrid, Spain. It was one of the publications of Sección Femenina, the women's branch of the Falange political party, which made public the messages of the institution during the much more radical era of the Francoist regime. Its subtitle was Seminario de la SF.

== History and profile ==
Medina was established in 1941 as one of the publications of the Sección Femenina targeting women. The first issue of the magazine appeared on 20 March 1941. Its publisher was Servicio de Prensa y Propaganda, a publishing company of Sección Femenina, in Madrid, and Medina came out weekly. The magazine was produced using the black and white ink on lower quality paper.

Medina provided a model of fascist women which advocated loyalty and submission. At the same time it promoted progressive ideas for women which contradicted with the Catholic ideas. For instance, the magazine overtly encouraged the education for girls in 1942. However, it also suggested that the goal was to better train them for their future roles as mothers and supportive wives. Medina continuously emphasized the importance of housework for both Spanish economy and policies. Another frequently covered topic in the magazine was the family's cleanliness which was expressed through advertisements.

Medina featured advice columns and replied the reader letters without publishing the letters. One of its contributors was Constancia de la Mora. The magazine ceased publication in 1945 due to financial reasons, and the last issue was published on 30 December that year.
