= La Codorniz =

Spanish satirical magazine (1941–1978)

- Categories: Satirical magazine
- Frequency: Weekly
- Founder: Miguel Mihura
- Founded: 1941
- First issue: 8 June 1941
- Final issue: 17 December 1978
- Company: La Vanguardia Española
- Country: Spain
- Based in: Madrid; Barcelona
- Language: Spanish

La Codorniz (Spanish: The Quail) was a weekly satirical magazine which was published in Madrid, Spain, between 1941 and 1978. From its start to 1951 its subtitle was Revista de Humor (Spanish: Humor Magazine). Then it was changed to La revista más audaz para el lector más inteligente (Spanish: The most audacious magazine for the most intelligent reader). It is often cited as the most known Spanish satirical magazine in the Francoist Spain and transition period.

== History and profile ==
La Codorniz was launched by Miguel Mihura in 1941. Tono was instrumental in the establishment of the magazine which was the successor of another satirical magazine entitled La Ametralladora (Spanish: The Machine Gun). The first issue of La Codorniz appeared on 8 June 1941. La Codorniz was published in Madrid on a weekly basis. In 1944 Mihura sold La Codorniz.

The magazine was edited by the following: Miguel Mihura (June 1941–June 1944), Álvaro de Laiglesia (1944–1977) and Manuel Summers (1977–1978). During the editorship of Mihura the magazine adopted an avant garde humor approach. Under Álvaro de Laiglesia it focused on social satire and realistic humor. In 1944 the owner of the magazine became La Vanguardia Española led by Carlos Godó Valls. Following this change the headquarters of the magazine moved to Barcelona. Fernando Perdiguero was the long-term managing editor of La Codorniz who served in the post until his death in 1970.

La Codorniz featured work by well-known artists, including Tono, Chumy Chúmez, Forges, Gayo, Julio Cebrián, Kalikrates, Madrigal, Máximo, Mingote and Manuel Summers. The magazine did not have a political agenda, and as a result, its contributors were from different political ideologies. However, the magazine was censored and suspended in 1973 and 1975. Its contributors and other Spanish journalists were subject to death threats in 1976. La Codorniz folded following the publication of the final issue dated 17 December 1978 due to low revenues.

La Codorniz inspired many satirical magazine, including El Jueves.
