= Mercedes Jara Moreno =

Spanish doctor and politician

Mercedes Jara Moreno MP

Member of the Congress of Deputies
- Incumbent
- Assumed office 10 November 2019
- Constituency: Almeria

Personal details
- Born: 27 June 1963 (age 63)
- Party: Vox
- Education: University of Cádiz

Mercedes Jara Moreno (born 27 June 1963) is a Spanish doctor and politician. She is a member of the Congress of Deputies for the Vox party representing the Almeria constituency.

Moreno holds a degree in medicine and surgery from the University of Cádiz. She was appointed as a member of the Congress of Deputies after Vox's original candidate for the Almeria list Carlos Hugo Fernández Roca resigned from the party's parliamentary group.

In the Congress, Moreno has voiced opposition to pregnancy by insemination and instead supports adoption or the "natural act of procreation."
