= Antonio Domínguez Ortiz =

Spanish historian (1909–2003)

Antonio Domínguez Ortiz (October 18, 1909 – January 21, 2003) was a Spanish historian, one of the leading specialists in the history of the Spanish Antiguo Régimen of the 16th through 18th centuries, in particular in social history. He was also expert historian of Andalusia, with a particular emphasis on the history of the Moriscos.

== Life ==
He was born in Seville in 1909 and baptized at the Church of San Pedro. Domínguez Ortiz received his doctorate in history from the Complutense University of Madrid, and taught at the University of Granada. He was the winner of the 1982 Prince of Asturias Award in the Social Sciences, Hijo Predilecto de Andalucía (1985) and was granted the honorary Doctor Honoris Causa by the University of Cádiz (1985). Besides his academic work, he wrote frequently for popular audiences, and was a regular contributor to El País.

He died in Granada in 2003 at the age of 93.

== Works ==
- Orto y ocaso de Sevilla, 1946 ("Rising and setting in Seville")
- Política y hacienda de Felipe IV, 1960 ("Policy and treasury of Philip IV")
- La sociedad española en el siglo XVII, 1963 and 1970 ("Spanish Society in the 17th Century")
- El incremento demográfico y sus problemas, 1966, ("Population Growth and its Problems")
- Crisis y decadencia en la España de los Austrias, 1969 ("Crisis and Decadence in Habsburg Spain")
- Los judeoconversos en España y América, 1971 ("Jewish Converts in Spain and the Americas")
- El Antíguo Régimen: los Reyes Católicos y los Austrias. Tomo III, Hª. de España, Madrid, Alfaguara, 1973 ("The Old Regime: the Catholic Monarchs and the Habsburgs")
- Las clases privilegiadas en la España del Antíguo Régimen, 1973 ("The Privileged Classes in Old Regime Spain")
- Hechos y figuras del siglo XVIII español, 1973 ("Deeds and Figures of 18th Century Spain")
- Sociedad y estado en el siglo XVIII español, 1976 ("Society and State in 18th Century Spain")
- Historia de los Moriscos. Vida y tragedia de una minoría, in collaboration with Bernard Vincent. Madrid, Revista de Occidente, 1978; 2ª ed. Madrid, Alianza, 1985. ("History of the Moriscos. Life and Tragedy of a Minority")
- Historia de Andalucía, 1980-1981. ("History of Andalusia")
- Andalucía, ayer y hoy, 1983 ("Andalusia, Yesterday and Today").
- Política fiscal y cambio en la España del siglo XVII, Madrid, Instituto de Estudios Fiscales, 1984 ("Fiscal Policy and Change in Spain in the 17th century).
- Instituciones y sociedad en la España de los Austrias, Barcelona, Ariel, 1985, volumen misceláneo. ("Institutions and society in Habsburg Spain")
- Carlos III y la España de la Ilustración, Alianza, 1988, ("Charles III and Enlightenment Spain")
- Las claves del despotismo español, 1715-1789, Barcelona, Planeta, 1990, ("The Keys to Spanish Despotism, 1715-1789")
- Los judeoconversos en la España moderna, Madrid, Mapfre, 1992 ("Jewish Converts in Modern Spain")
- La sociedad americana y la corona española en el siglo XVII, Madrid, Marcial Pons, 1996. ("American Society and the Spanish Crown in the 17th Century")
- Estudios americanistas, Madrid, RAH, 1998. ("Americanist Studies")
- España, tres milenios de historia Marcial Pons, 2000. ("Spain, Three Millennia of History")

== Memorial ==
The public secondary school Professor Domínguez Ortiz in Azuqueca de Henares (in the province of Guadalajara) is named after him.
