= Robert Marrast =

- Born: 1928; Toulouse, France
- Died: 2015 (aged 86–87); France
- Education: University of Bordeaux
- Occupations: Hispanist, translator, professor
- Notable work: José de Espronceda en son temps, Théâtre espagnol du XVIIe siècle
- Awards: Doctor Honoris Causa, University of Alicante (2002)

Robert Marrast (1928–2015) was a French Hispanist, scholar of Spanish Romanticism, professor of Spanish literature, and a prolific translator of Spanish and Latin American authors. His academic and literary work focused on figures such as José de Espronceda, Rafael Alberti, and Federico García Lorca. Marrast played a key role in introducing and promoting Spanish theater and literature to French audiences.

== Academic career ==
Born in Toulouse, Marrast grew up in Perpignan and studied Spanish at the University of Bordeaux. He began his teaching career in Rennes in 1955 and later became an assistant at the Sorbonne (1957). In 1965, he returned to Rennes as a professor, before finally settling at University Sorbonne Nouvelle after 1968. From 1984 until his retirement, he held a chair at the University of Bordeaux.

== Scholarly contributions ==
Marrast's academic work is particularly noted for his deep studies on José de Espronceda. His doctoral dissertation, José de Espronceda en son temps: littérature, société, politique au temps du romantisme, was published in 1974 and translated into Spanish in 1989. He also edited a critical edition of El estudiante de Salamanca (1978) and contributed to studies on Romanticism in the Bulletin Hispanique.

He was a pioneer in the study of theater during the Spanish Civil War, notably through his book El teatre durant la guerra civil espanyola: assaig d'història i documents (1978). Marrast also explored Spanish exile literature and lesser-known texts from prominent 20th-century authors.

== Contributions to literary recovery ==
Marrast dedicated considerable effort to recovering forgotten or unpublished works, especially those by Rafael Alberti, Antonio Machado, Miguel Hernández, and Federico García Lorca. His 1972 edition of Marinero en tierra, reprinted in 1990 and supervised by Rafael Alberti himself, establishes the final and definitive version of this work and is considered canonical.

He published and translated various prose texts, poetry collections, and interviews, contributing significantly to the preservation and dissemination of Spanish literary heritage. He participated in the edition of the Complete Works of Rafael Alberti, published by Seix Barral to commemorate the centenary of Alberti's birth. Under the direction of Pere Gimferrer of the Royal Spanish Academy, he participated alongside other prominent researchers such as Gonzalo Santonja, José María Balcells, Eladio Mateos Miera, and Jaime Siles.

Marrast was recognized as a key cultural intermediary between Spain and France. He collaborated with Spanish and Latin American authors such as Juan Goytisolo, Luis Goytisolo, Pío Baroja, Carlos Fuentes, Octavio Paz, Cabrera Infante, Luis Cernuda and others. In 2002, he was awarded an honorary doctorate by the University of Alicante for his contributions to the promotion of Spanish culture in France.

Robert Marrast was a founding member of the scientific committee of the journal Moenia and remained active in scholarly circles until his death in 2015. His personal archive and library, especially focused on the Generation of '27, were entrusted to the Fundación Rafael Alberti in El Puerto de Santa María.

== Work as a translator ==
Robert Marrast was instrumental in translating modern and classical Spanish theater into French. Among his notable translations are works by Valle-Inclán, including Divinas palabras (as Divines paroles), Los cuernos de don Friolera (as Les cornes de don Sapristi), and several esperpentos. He collaborated with Pierre Darmangeat on translations published by Gallimard.

He also translated works by Miguel de Cervantes, such as El cerco de Numancia and El rufián dichoso, and directed prestigious collections like Théâtre espagnol du XVIe siècle and Théâtre espagnol du XVIIe siècle in the Bibliothèque de la Pléiade.

== Selected works ==
- José de Espronceda en son temps: littérature, société, politique au temps du romantisme (1974)
- Théâtre espagnol du XVIe siècle (1983), ed.
- Théâtre espagnol du XVIIe siècle (1984), ed.
- Aspects du théâtre de Rafael Alberti (1967)
- Écrits sur García Lorca dont sa dernière Interview (2013)
