= María García Torrecillas =

Spanish nurse and mid-wife

- Born: María García Torrecillas; May 16, 1916; Albánchez, Almería, Spain
- Died: February 3, 2014 (aged 97); Monterrey, Mexico
- Citizenship: Spain
- Occupations: Nurse; Midwife
- Era: Spanish Civil War
- Known for: Spanish nurse who assisted in the birth hundreds of children of Republican loyalists in exile
- Movement: Spanish republicanism

María García Torrecillas (16 May 1916 – 3 February 2014) was a Spanish assistant nurse and mid-wife who assisted in the delivery of around 300 babies while in exile in Vichy France as a result of the Spanish Civil War.

Part of a generation of young people from Almeria seeking better opportunities in Catalonia, García and her sister moved to Barcelona to join their older brother. Initially working in a yarn factory, the events of July 1936 led her to working for a Republican munitions factory and volunteering at a hospital run by International Red Aid.. The fall of Barcelona in January 1939 made García part of the first large wave of people to flee the city towards the French border.

Once arriving at the Argelès-sur-Mer concentration camp in France, García found herself pregnant in a situation where it was very difficult to give birth. With the Swiss Aid Association running the Elna Ward, García was helped with her pregnancy by Swiss nurse Elisabeth Eidenbenz. Eidenbenz inspired García to take up the same profession, and she would go on to assist over 300 women give birth in the camps. She would also assist Jewish and Polish women fleeing Nazi persecution in Vichy France by forging papers and changing names so they could more easily hide in the Spanish Republican refugee population.

In 1943, García left on a Portuguese flagged ship, Serpapinto, full of Spanish refugees for Mexico to find the father of her son. After connecting with him and realizing the relationship would not work, García set about making her own way. This included going back into nursing to help other Spanish Civil War refugee women with their pregnancies, before eventually going back into the textile industry. She then settled into the quiet life. After Mexico City was hit by a devastating earthquake in 1985, García and her husband moved to Monterrey to be close to her son. She published her memoirs, Mi Exilio, at the age of 80. Starting in 2005, while in her late 80s, García would make her visits back to Spain. The first time was for a ceremony to honor Eidenbenz. The time in 2007 was to receive an award on the Andalusia Day from the Junta de Andalucía for her work in helping Spanish women during the Civil War. García died on 3 February 2014 in Monterrey at the age of 97.

== Childhood ==
García was born on 16 May 1916 in Albánchez, Almería into a well-to-do rural family. Her father had an adventurous spirit, which she inherited. As young person, she had traveled with her family to several Latin American countries. Her father read newspapers on a daily basis, discussing what he read with others in the town's main plaza. Both of her parents believed in free choice, secular culture and freedom of expression. They transmitted these values to their children.

As a child, García attended her Townhall Republican School (Spanish: escuela que el Ayuntamiento republicano). There, she picked up a voracious reading habit that would carry into adulthood. As a child, she had wanted to be a nurse.

== Barcelona and the Civil War ==
Shortly before the start of the Spanish Civil War, the 20-year-old moved with her sister to Barcelona in 1936 to work in a yarn factory. She received her father's permission before going to Barcelona to join their older brother, and his family which included two small children. When she said goodbye to them when she left Albánchez, it was the last time she saw them in her life. Her last memory of her mother was of her sitting in a kitchen chair, crying. García became part of a generation of young people from Almeria to seek better opportunities in Catalonia.

While working in the yarn factory, García also started to learn Catalan, as part of the process of better integrating into Catalan society. During her free time, she volunteered to assist the ill and infirm at a hospital run by International Red Aid. It was during this time that she learned about rudimentary emergency care.

As a result of the Civil War starting in July 1936, the yarn factory García worked in was converted to a Republican weapons factory. While working at the factory, she had to deal with the daily reality of Franco allied Italian forces bombings of her city. The siege of Ciudad Condal (Barcelona) by Franco's forces led to the fall of Barcelona on 26 January 1939. Hundreds of refugees were already in the city at the time the city fell, as they were trying to escape Franco's forces who had pushed them out of other parts of Spain early. The events around 26 January 1939 pushed an entire community into flight towards the French border. García was among those making the same decision. She became part of the first wave of refugees to leave Barcelona, when she departed in January. García was one of a half million Spaniards who would make the difficult journey to France. Her flight also made her one of 50,000 Republican Andalusians to leave Spain as a consequence of the Civil War, of which she and many others never returned.

== Exile in France ==
=== Journey ===
As part of the great exodus of people, García's trek to France was done alongside classmates, colleagues and friends via foot. She carried with her only a small bag with a change of clothes. The group first headed towards Girona, follow en route the whole time by Italian bombers who made it difficult to sleep. Some friends and compatriots died along the route. People traveling with them tried to gently put the dead into ditches as it was not possible to bury them. The reasons they died varied. One cause that García bore witness to was the cold. Once in Girona, García sought out an occultist to assist in removing a burr she had developed on her foot during the journey. She also had an eye infection. The occultist provided free treatment and wished her and others in her group well on their journey to France. Girona also afforded her an opportunity to eat for the first time in some days. In Puigcerdá, near the border, García met up with her boyfriend Teófilo Seaz, and friends María Gil and Angelita. The meeting was short, and the pair separated again as Seaz connected with and then traveled onward towards France with his own relatives. She eventually made it to the Argelès-sur-Mer camp.

=== Camp life ===
Refugees found themselves at concentration camps in Argelers, Sant Cebriá and el de Barcarés 7. In January 1939, the Argelès-sur-Mer camp was ringed with barbed wire, and guarded by soldiers on horseback who were trying to prevent their escape. Pregnant women were transported to stables, so they could give birth in horse stalls covered in straw. With so few options to keep babies warm, many women covered their babies in sand to keep away the cold. The only food García, Sáez and other refugees were given often was bread and salty dried cod. Conditions in the camp were very poor.

While in exile in France, she received letters from her parents and sister in Barcelona. While describing life as difficult, her family discouraged García from returning.

=== Pregnancy ===
While in the Argelès-sur-Mer camp, García found herself pregnant with her partner Teófilo Sáez's baby. García regularized her relationship with Sáez, which enabled them to move to the camp in Saint Cebriá de Rosselló for married couples. If she had not done this, she feared she would be sent to the fields to work after giving birth. When she was seven months pregnant, she weighed only 45 kilos. While at the camp, she met the Swiss nurse Elizabeth Eidemberg who assisted her during her pregnancy. Eidemberg helped García give birth to her only son, Felipe. Meanwhile, Teófilo went into exile overseas in Mexico after the gendarmes came looking for him, suspecting him of being a communist.

=== Nursing ===
Healthcare at the camp in 1939 was initially served by the International Red Aid. The requirement of the International Red Aid to leave allowed the Swiss nurses to take over.

The Swiss Aid Association was running the Elna Ward by1940. Swiss nurse Elisabeth Eidenbenz was part of this Swiss group, having previously served in Spain during the Civil War. Serving as part of a small group of six Swiss nurses, a midwife and a nursing ward director, Spanish women began to feel more comfortable giving birth in the camps after they learned of her presence. The Swiss being in charge in turn provided opportunities for Spanish women to volunteer more and to get access to better maternity care. Working in the ward enabled Spanish women to get access to mail from Spain, more food and more privileges. It also forced them to learn more languages. At the same time that the Swiss were in charge of delivering health services, most of the concentration camps in France were staffed by Spanish health workers. Shortly after Eidenbenz began to serve in the Elna Ward, the French government fell to the Nazis and were replaced by the Vichy government in 1940. The Elna Maternity Ward served women with a wide array of feminine identities, which merged because of a common struggle. The ward served three of seventeen concentration camps set up specifically for Spanish refugees. It later became dependent on the Swiss Red Cross, only closing in 1944 at the orders of the Nazi German government. 597 women gave birth during its existence.

Meeting Eidemberg while pregnant inspired García to become a nurse. She had had little training beyond emergency care assistance prior to that. She eventually became an auxiliary nurse in the Elne Ward. As a Spanish refugee in France, she assisted other Spanish refugee women, and Polish and Jewish women fleeing persecution from the Nazis to give birth. Following Felipe's birth, she started assisting other women give birth and taking care of their young children. Her activities involved sneaking out of the camp and searching out food. She had endless hours to serve as Eidemberg's right-hand woman, saying of the experience, "There were no hours there, at six in the morning I was already in the cribs, preparing the diapers so that at seven o'clock the mothers would start feeding them." Theirs became a vocational passion for service to save lives and to give a lot of affection." García worked in the Elna Ward from 1940 to 1943, assisting in at least 300 births.

Working with Eidemberg and other women in Elne, García was nearly caught by the Gestapo many times, while still managing to assist with 600 births of children who may not have survived otherwise. She also assisted Jewish women to hide from the Gestapo. García also helped by forging passports and sneaking back and forth across the border. She also helped hide Jewish women by changing names on registrations for babies, giving them Spanish names that would not attract attention from the Gestapo. For example, Samuel became Antonio and Jacob became Julian.

== Exile in Mexico ==
After two and a half years in exile in France, in 1943, García finally decided she wanted to re-unite with her partner Teófilo Sáez in Mexico and so left on a Portuguese flagged ship, Serpapinto, full of Spanish refugees.

When García arrived in Mexico, there were already 11,000 Spaniards living there in exile. The Cardenista policy at the time meant Mexico was more willing than many other countries to take in Spanish refugees. Many of the women who arrived in Mexico had young children and no resources of their own. Many would never hear news from their family in Spain again, with their families never knowing they had made a new life in Mexico. The Red Cross and Auxilio a los Republicanos Españoles assisted Spaniards in getting settled in the country.

García took advantage of the Spanish refugee network of aid that existed at the time. This networked helped her in tracking down her Sáez. When García arrived in Veracruz, Mexico, after several days of searching, she found Teófilo living with another woman who was pregnant.

After learning of Sáez's betrayal, García then made the decision to go it alone as a single mother. She quickly found herself living among other Spanish exiles, finding work at a maternity hospital in Mexico City where she worked as a nurse. The knowledge she learned while working in France enabled her to bring maternity practices to Mexico that were unknown at the time. It also enabled her to continue to help other Spanish political women in exile to give birth.

While living in Mexico's capital, García met fellow Spanish exile José Fernández, whom she married and stayed married to for over fifty years. Later, García went back to working with textiles, slowly saving up money to try to assist her brothers to join her in Mexico. Some did make the move to the country. Her brother Juan did not, being twice condemned to die by the Francoist government for fighting for the Republican Army. His death sentence is later commuted to life behind bars thanks to efforts of another brother. Later, Juan was given special authorization to leave prison to visit the Sanctuary of Lourdes. García then tried to settle into a quiet life in Mexico City, living peacefully without attracting much attention to herself.

== Retired life ==
While living in Mexico, García tried to live her life quietly without attracting much attention. Despite her accomplishments earlier in life, she still did not feel she had done enough to help others. Mexico City was hit by a devastating earthquake in 1985, which almost killed García and her husband. Her son was living in Monterrey at the time, and the couple decided because of the earthquake to join him in the city in order to be closer to them.

In the 2000s, at the age of 80, García published her memoirs called "Mi Exilio." In 2005, she returned to Spain for the first time since she left to attend a ceremony honoring Elizabeth Eidemberg.

García was honored with a tribute by Junta de Andalucía in 2007 for her work during the Spanish Civil War, receiving the award on the Andalusia Day. Her return at the age of 90 to accept the award was only the third time she had returned to Spain following the end of the Civil War. She was also decorated by the Almeria Red Cross at the same ceremony. She was accompanied to Seville ceremony by her only son, Felipe Sáez. She also visited her home town, Albánchez, the first time in 45 years that she had done so.

García died on 3 February 2014 in Monterrey at the age of 97. Her hometown of Albanchez held a tribute in her honor after she died. Mayor Francisco Martínez explained the need to have a ceremony "because people like her can not be forgotten, on the contrary, they should be in the memory of everyone and especially the youngest ones". The event was held at the Rafael Alberti Theater.
