= Hijo Predilecto de Andalucía =

Emblem of Andalusia

The title of Hijo Predilecto de Andalucía ("Favorite Son of Andalusia") or in the case of a female recipient Hija Predilecta de Andalucía ("Favorite Daughter of Andalusia") is an honorific title granted annually on August 10 according to decree 156/1983 of the Andalusian Autonomous Government, recognizing exceptional merit or distinction in relation to the Andalusian region, through scientific, social or political actions or works that have redounded to the benefit of Andalusia. It is the highest distinction of the autonomous community of Andalusia.

== The nature of the honor ==
The honor is granted by agreement of the Governing Council of the Andalusian Autonomous Government, based on names proposed by the President of the Government, passed on by the president's office, the Consejería de la Presidencia. The title is strictly honorific, and does not entail any award of money. The names of those given the title are written in a registry known as the Libro de Oro de Andalucía ("Golden Book of Andalusia"). A medal is awarded with the inscription Hijo Predilecto de Andalucía, along with a silver plaque stating the reason for granting the award in this particular case. Normally at most ten medals are awarded each year, although the Governing Council may make exceptions to that. (In practice, as of 2009 that number has never been reached.) That count does not include awards given as a courtesy or in reciprocity, nor does it include posthumous awards. The honor is awarded in a public and solemn ceremony presided over by the President of the Government, in the presence of the Governing Council, and if possible coinciding with the regional holiday, the Andalusia Day, 28 February. The honor can be revoked if the recipient behaves publicly in a manner counter to the Autonomous Community of Andalusia, the principles of the 1978 Constitution of Spain or the Statute of Autonomy of Andalusia, or prejudicial to the dignity of their basic interests.

== List of Hijos Predilectos de Andalucía ==
- 1983

Antonio Cruz García ("Antonio Mairena"), singer, Mairena del Alcor, Province of Seville
Rafael Alberti, writer, El Puerto de Santa María, Cádiz
Vicente Aleixandre Merlo, writer, Seville
Jorge Guillén Álvarez, writer, Valladolid
Andrés Segovia, guitarist, Linares, Jaén
Ramón Carande y Thovar, historian and economist, Palencia, autonomous community of Castile-Leon

- 1984

Juan Álvarez Ossorio y Barrau, historian, activist

- 1985

Rafael Escuredo Rodríguez, lawyer and politician, Estepa, Seville
María Zambrano Alarcón, writer, Vélez-Málaga, Málaga
Antonio Gala Velasco, writer, Brazatortas, Ciudad Real
Carlos Castilla del Pino, psychiatrist, San Roque, Cádiz
Antonio Domínguez Ortiz, historian, Seville

- 1987

José Antonio Valverde Gómez, zoologist
Manuel Andújar, writer, La Carolina, Jaén
Juan de Mata Carriazo

- 1988

Emilio García Gómez, historian specializing in Arabism, Madrid
Manuel Castillo Navarro, composer and pianist, Seville
Manuel Rivera Hernández, painter, Granada
Pablo García Baena, poet, Córdoba
José Manuel Rodríguez Delgado, physician and neurophysiologist, Málaga

- 1989

Rafael Montesinos Martínez, poet, Seville, Seville
José Muñoz Caballero, painter, Huelva
Luis Rosales Camacho, poet, Granada, Granada

- 1990

Javier Benjumea Puigcerver, businessman, founder of Abengoa, Seville
Dolores Jiménez Alcántara "Niña de La Puebla", singer, La Puebla de Cazalla, Seville
Francisco Ayala y García Duarte, writer, Granada, Granada

- 1991

José Rodríguez de la Borbolla y Camoyán, lawyer and politician, Seville, Seville

- 1992

José Antonio Muñoz Rojas, poet, Antequera, Málaga, Málaga

- 1993

Manuel Losada Villasante, scientist, Carmona, Seville

- 1994

S.A.R. Doña María de las Mercedes de Borbón y Orleans, mother of the King Juan Carlos, Madrid

- 1995

Miguel Rodríguez-Piñero Bravo-Ferrer, jurist, professor, magistrate and president of the Constitutional Court of Spain, Seville, Seville

- 1996

José Manuel Caballero Bonald, poet and essayist, Jerez de la Frontera, Cádiz, Cádiz

- 1997

No award given.

- 1998

Felipe González Márquez, lawyer and politician, Dos Hermanas, Seville, Seville

- 1999

Manuel F. Clavero Arévalo, lawyer and politician, Seville, Seville

- 2000

Carlos Amigo Vallejo, Archbishop of Seville, Medina de Rioseco, Valladolid

- 2001

Carlos Cano, songwriter, Granada, Granada. (Posthumous.)
Pedro Cruz Villalón, president of the Constitutional Court of Spain, Seville, Seville

- 2002

Manuel Jiménez de Parga, president of the Constitutional Court of Spain, Granada, Granada

- 2003

Emilio Lledó Íñigo, professor of philosophy, Seville, Seville
Christine Ruiz-Picasso, daughter-in-law of Pablo Picasso, philanthropist, Paris, France

- 2004

Francisco Márquez Villanueva, professor of medieval literature, Seville, Seville
Leopoldo de Luis, poet, Córdoba, Córdoba

- 2005

María Victoria Atencia García, poet, Málaga, Málaga
Julia Uceda Valiente, poet, literary critic, and professor of literature, Seville, Seville

- 2006

María del Rosario Cayetana Fitz-James Stuart y Silva, 18th Duchess of Alba, (Madrid)
Carlos Edmundo de Ory, poet, Cádiz, Cádiz

- 2007

José Saramago, writer, Azinhaga, Portugal

- 2008

Federico Mayor Zaragoza, former rector of the University of Granada, former director general of UNESCO. Barcelona, autonomous community of Catalonia

- 2009

Juan Antonio Carrillo Salcedo, Doctor of Laws at the University of Seville, expert in international law, Morón de la Frontera, Seville

- 2010

Augusto Méndez de Lugo, president of the High Court of Justice of Andalusia, Ceuta and Melilla
Francisca Díaz Torres, owner of the "El Romeral" estate

- 2011

Juana de Aizpuru, gallerist
Alfonso Guerra, politician

- 2012

Luis Gordillo, painter
Josefina Molina, film director

- 2013

Antonio Banderas, actor
Manuel José García Caparrós, syndicalist (posthumous)
Carmen Laffón de la Escosura, painter

- 2014

Miguel Ríos, singer

- 2015

Alberto Rodríguez Librero, film director

- 2016

Joaquín Sabina, singer-songwriter
Ángel Salvatierra, transplant specialist

- 2017

María Galiana, actress and teacher
Luis García Montero, writer

- 2018

José Luis Gómez García, actor, director and producer
Guillermo Antiñolo Gil, physician and researcher in fetal and genetic medicine

- 2019

Francisco Martínez-Cosentino, businessman
José Luis García Palacios, president of the Fundación Caja Rural del Sur (posthumous)

- 2020

Curro Romero, bullfighter
Antonio Burgos, journalist
Joaquín, footballer

- 2021

Raphael, singer

- 2022

Alejandro Sanz, singer-songwriter
Manuel Alejandro, composer

- 2023

David Bisbal, singer
Lola Flores, actress, bailaora and singer (posthumous)

- 2024

José Mercé, flamenco singer
Santiago Muñoz Machado, director of the Royal Spanish Academy

- 2025

Jesús Navas, footballer
Pilar Manchón Portillo, artificial intelligence researcher

- 2026

Manuel Carrasco, singer-songwriter
Paz Vega, actress

== Acceptance speeches ==
Most of the recipients of the award come with a prepared acceptance speech. Politician Felipe González broke somewhat with this tradition in 1998 when he gave part of his speech extemporaneously; writer José Saramago in 2007 gave an entirely improvised speech. During his speech his medal fell to the floor and he had to stoop to recover it. He then continued, "This could be resolved with a Latin proverb, Sic transit gloria mundi, which gained him a round of applause.
