= Bahía de Algeciras Campus =

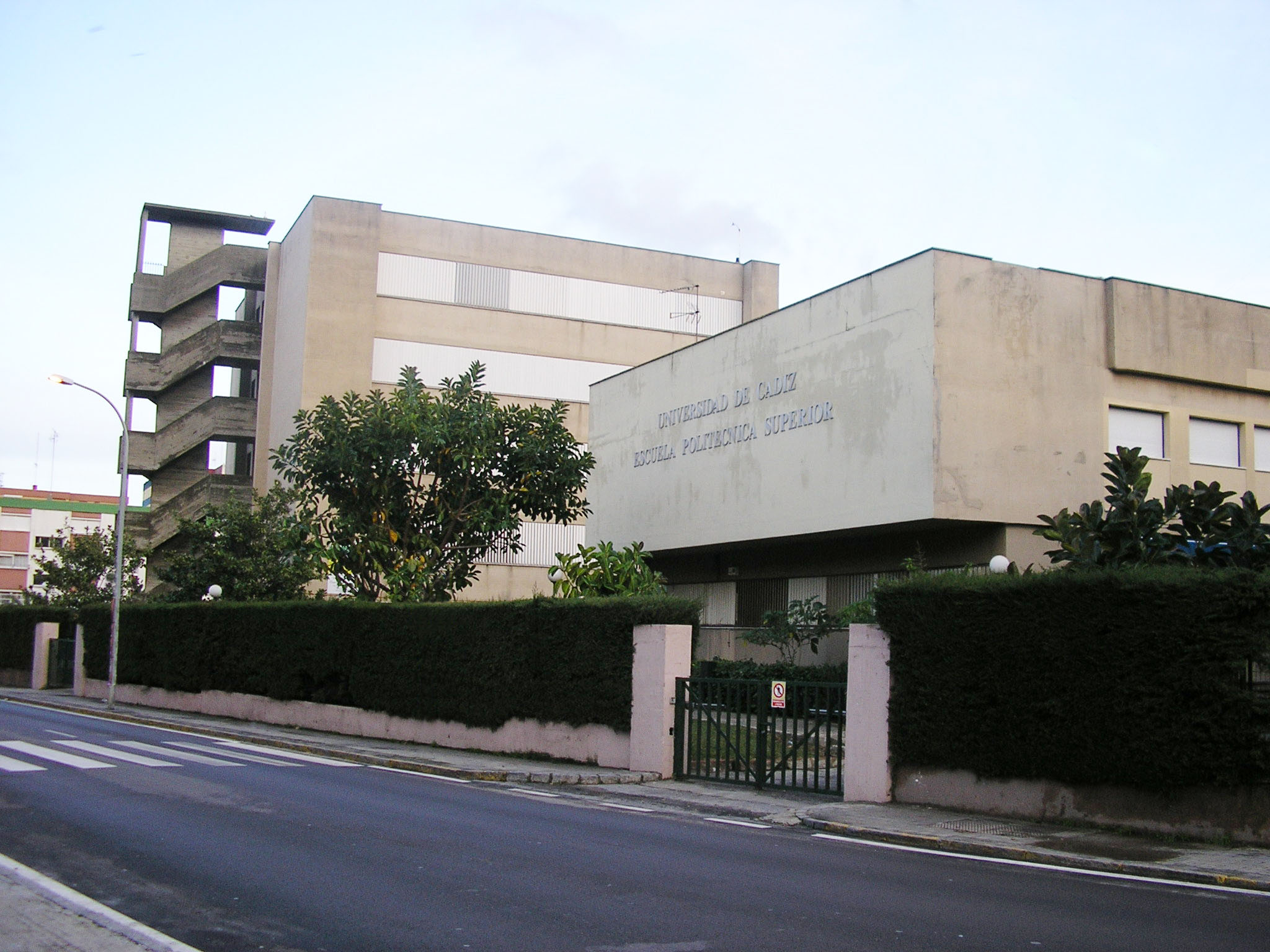
Polytechnic School of Algeciras

The Bahía de Algeciras Campus UCA is a branch of the University of Cádiz (UCA). Its facilities are located in Algeciras and La Linea de la Concepción, Spain.

== Structure ==
The Bahia de Algeciras campus is operated by the Municipal University Foundation. The Foundation is located in the former Military Hospital of Algeciras. Its board is formed by a president (the mayor of the city) and a vice president (the Councillor for University Studies), as well as municipal representatives, students, professors, unions and companies in the region, and the management board.

== Teaching ==
The Algeciras campus includes the following schools and programs

- The Higher Polytechnic School, which offers degrees in Engineering, Technical Industrial Engineering and Public Works Engineering programs that work toward a civil engineering degree.
- the University School of Nursing.
- The University School of Judicial and Economic Studies Francisco Tomás y Valiente. The law degree includes specialization in Law and Business, Maritime and Harbour Law, or Penitentiary Law. There are degrees in Business Science, Labor Relations, and Growth and Public Administration
- The University School of Tourism and Social Work awards diplomas in Tourism and Social Work.
- The University School of Teaching is located in La Línea de la Concepción.

== See also ==
- Cádiz Campus
- Jerez de la Frontera Campus
- Puerto real campus
