= Marrast =

Marrast is a surname. Notable people with the surname include:

- Armand Marrast (1801–1852), French politician, journalist and mayor of Paris
- Robert Marrast (1928–2015), French professor of Hispanic culture
