= Rafael Alberti =

Spanish poet (1902–1999)

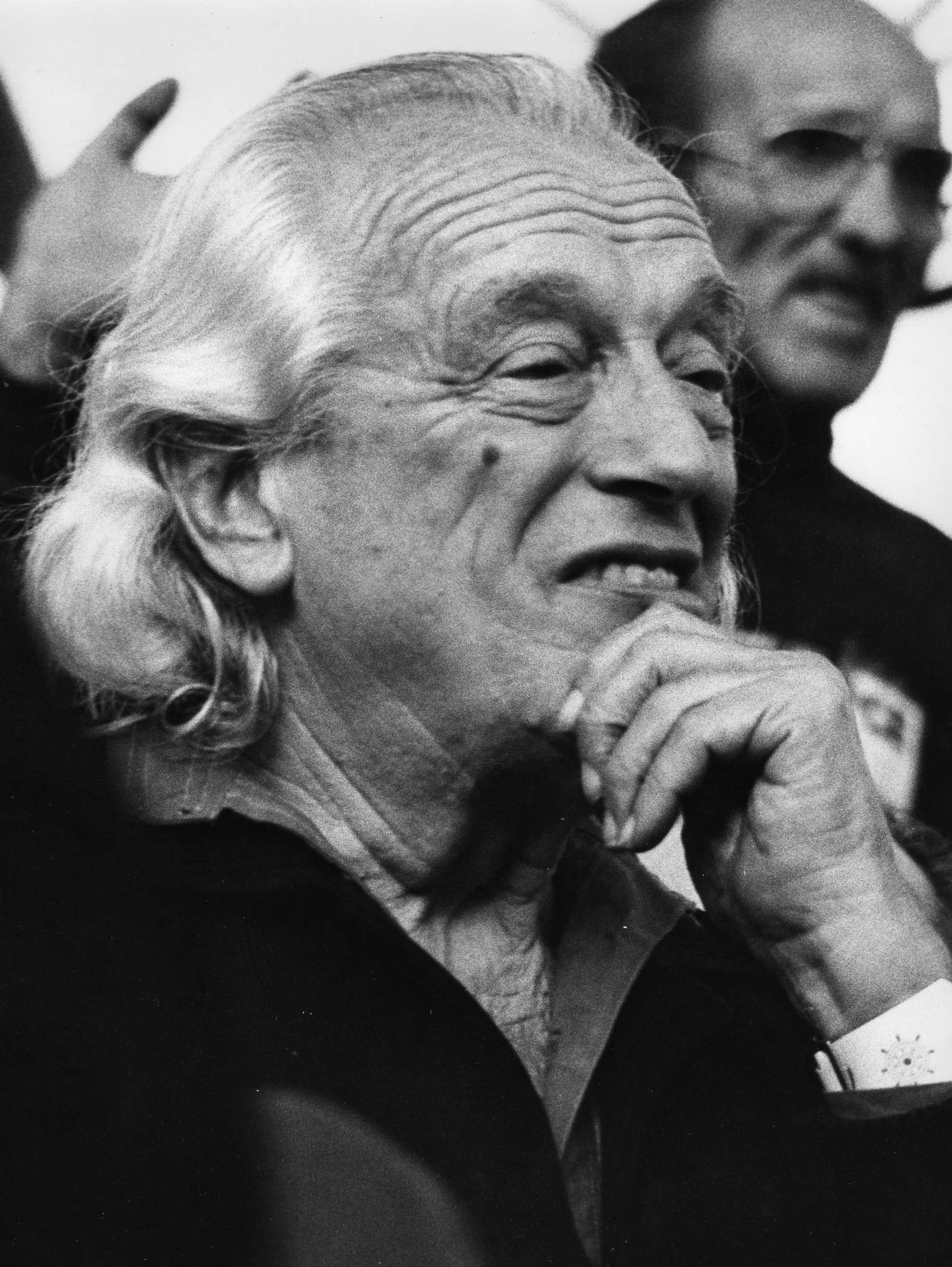
- Alberti in Casa de Campo (Madrid), 1978
- Born: Rafael Alberti Merello; 16 December 1902; El Puerto de Santa María, Cádiz, Kingdom of Spain
- Died: 28 October 1999 (aged 96); El Puerto de Santa María, Cádiz, Spain
- Spouse: María Teresa León (m. 1932; died 1988)
- Children: Aitana Alberti León

Rafael Alberti Merello (16 December 1902 – 28 October 1999) was a Spanish poet, a member of the Generation of '27. He is considered one of the greatest literary figures of the so-called Silver Age of Spanish Literature, and he won numerous prizes and awards. He died aged 96. After the Spanish Civil War, he went into exile because of his Marxist beliefs. On his return to Spain after the death of Franco, Alberti was named Hijo Predilecto de Andalucía in 1983, and Doctor Honoris Causa by the Universidad de Cádiz in 1985.

He published his memoirs under the title La Arboleda perdida ("The Lost Grove") in 1959 and this remains the best source of information on his early life.

== Life ==
=== Early life ===
El Puerto de Santa María at the mouth of the Guadalete River on the Bay of Cádiz was, as now, one of the major distribution outlets for the sherry trade from Jerez de la Frontera. Alberti was born there in 1902, to a family of vintners who had once been the most powerful in town, suppliers of sherry to the crowned heads of Europe. Both of his grandfathers were Italian; one of his grandmothers was from Huelva, the other from Ireland. However, at some point, while they were handing down the business to the next generation, bad management resulted in the bodegas being sold to the Osbornes. As a result, Alberti's father was no more than a commercial traveller for the company, always away on business, as the general agent for Spain for brands of sherry and brandy that had, before, only been exported to the UK. This sense of belonging to a "bourgeois family now in decline" was to become an enduring theme in his mature poetry. At the age of 10, he entered the Jesuit Colegio San Luis Gonzaga as a charity day-boy. During his first year, Alberti was a model student but his growing awareness of how differently the boarders were treated from the day-boys, together with the other ranking systems operated by the Jesuits, inspired in him a desire to rebel. In his memoirs, he attributes it to growing class conflict. He began to play truant and defy the school authorities until he was finally expelled in 1917. However, his family was then at the point of moving to Madrid, which meant that the disgrace did not register on Alberti or his family as strongly as it might have done.

The family moved to Calle de Atocha in Madrid in May 1917. By the time of the move, Alberti had already shown a precocious interest in painting. In Madrid, he again neglected his formal studies, preferring to go to the Casón del Buen Retiro and the Prado, where he spent many hours copying paintings and sculptures. It was as a painter that he made his first entries into the artistic world of the capital. For example, in October 1920, he was invited to exhibit in the Autumn Salon in Madrid. However, according to his memoirs, the deaths in 1920 in quick succession of his father, the matador Joselito, and Benito Pérez Galdós inspired him to write poetry.

=== Life in Madrid ===
In 1921, he was diagnosed with tuberculosis and he spent many months recuperating in a sanatorium in the Sierra de Guadarrama where he read avidly among the works of Antonio Machado and Juan Ramón Jiménez, as well as various Ultraist and Vanguardista writers. At this time, he also met Dámaso Alonso, at that time a poet rather than the formidable critic he would become, and it was he who introduced Alberti to the works of Gil Vicente and other Golden Age writers. He began to write poetry in earnest and submitted a few, successfully, to various avant-garde magazines. The book that resulted from this activity, Marinero en tierra (Sailor on Dry Land), submitted at the last minute, won the National Poetry Award in 1925.

He enjoyed great success over the next few years in the sense of artistic prestige: he was still financially dependent on his family. The new literary magazines were eager to publish his works. He was also starting to make friends with the people who would eventually get grouped together as the Generation of '27. He already knew Dámaso Alonso and, on one of his returns to Madrid, he met Vicente Aleixandre, a resident of the Salamanca district. It was probably in October 1924 – Alberti's memoirs are vague on this and many other details – that he met Federico García Lorca in the Residencia de Estudiantes. He was known to have a rocky relationship with him, since Lorca was gay and Alberti didn't approve of his sexuality. They weren't best of friends, but when Lorca finally died, in 1936, he dedicated a poem to him. During further visits to the Residencia - it seems that he never actually became a member himself - he met Pedro Salinas, Jorge Guillén, and Gerardo Diego along with many other cultural icons such as Luis Buñuel, and Salvador Dalí.

The kind of folkloric/cancionero poetry he had used in Marinero was also employed in two further collections – La amante ("The Mistress") and El alba del alhelí ("Dawn of the Wallflower") – but with the approach of the Góngora Tercentenary he began to write in a style that was not only more formally demanding but which also enabled him to be more satirical and dramatic. The result was Cal y canto ("Quicklime and Plainsong"). Alberti himself was present at the meeting at a Madrid cafe in April 1926, when the plans for the tercentenary were first sketched out - along with Pedro Salinas, Melchor Fernández Almagro and Gerardo Diego.

Before the Tercentennial celebrations were over, Alberti was starting to write the first poems of Sobre los ángeles ("Concerning the Angels"), a book that showed a complete change of direction in the poetry of not only Alberti, but also the whole Group, and is generally considered his masterpiece. His next collections, Sermones y moradas ("Sermons and mansions") and Yo era un tonto y lo que he visto me ha hecho dos tontos ("I was a fool and what I have seen has made me two fools"), together with a play El hombre deshabitado ("The Empty Man"), all showed signs of a psychological breakdown which, to the surprise of everyone who knew him, had overwhelmed Alberti and from which he was only saved by his elopement with the writer and political activist María Teresa León in either 1929 or 1930 – again his memoirs are not clear on the date.

=== Marriage, conversion to Marxism, civil war and exile ===
The inference from his memoirs is that she played a key role, along with his continuing bitter memories of the Colegio, in the process that converted the easy-going, carousing bohemian of the early books into the committed Communist of the 1930s. The establishment of the Second Spanish Republic in 1931 was another factor that pushed Alberti towards Marxism and he joined the Communist Party of Spain. For Alberti, it became a religion in all but name and there is evidence that suggests that some of his friends tired of his unceasing attempts to "convert" them. As a Party emissary, he was finally freed from financial dependence on his family and he made several trips to northern Europe. But when Gil Robles came to power in 1933, the violent attacks that Alberti launched against him in the magazine Octubre ("October"), which he had founded with María Teresa, led to a period of exile.

At the start of the Spanish Civil War he was imprisoned in Ibiza and released in August 1936 when the island returned to Republican control. By November 1936 he was in Madrid having commandeered an aristocrat's palace (Palacio de Zabálburu) near Retiro Park as headquarters of his Alianza de Intelectuales Anti-fascistas (Alliance of Anti-Fascist Intellectuals), which became a second home to Gerda Taro. During the Spanish Civil War, Alberti became the poetic voice of the left and he made frequent broadcasts from the capital during the Siege of Madrid by the Francoist armies, composing poems in praise of the defenders of the city. He published them in a magazine entitled El Mono Azul, which he cofounded with his wife. There was scarcely an edition of the XV International Brigade newspaper, Volunteer for Liberty, which did not contain one of his poems. He also took part in a commission in charge of the purge of the Alliance members.

In early 1939 he and his wife were in Elda running a large country house as a hotel, at which many Republicans gathered considering exile. These included La Pasionara, Enrique Líster and Juan Modesto. After the defeat of the Spanish Republican Armed Forces and the disbandment of the Republic by the rebel faction, Alberti and María fled to Paris via Oran and moved into an apartment together with Pablo Neruda on the Quai de l'Horloge. They lived in Paris until the end of 1940 working as translators for French radio and as announcers for the broadcasts of Paris-Mondial in Latin-America. After the German occupation of France they sailed from Marseille to Buenos Aires on the SS Mendoza.

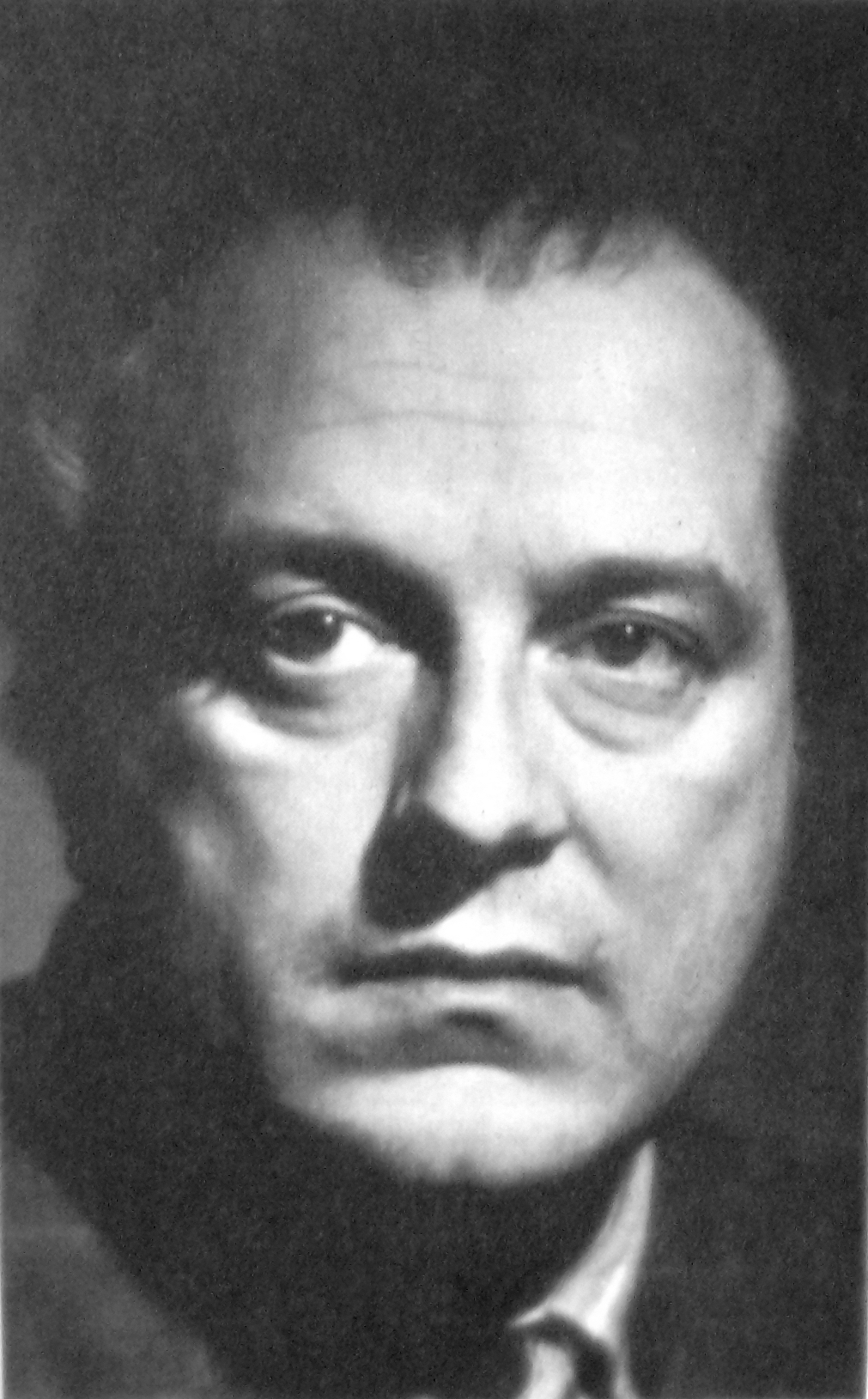
Rafael Alberti (1968)

They lived in Argentina until 1963. Among other activities – he worked for the Losada publishing house and continued writing and painting – Alberti worked in the Argentinian film industry, notably as the adaptor of a play by Pedro Calderón de la Barca, La dama duende ("The Ghost Lady") in 1945. They then moved to Rome. On 27 April 1977 they returned to Spain. Shortly after his return Alberti was elected deputy for Cádiz in the constituent Congress of the Spanish parliament on the Communist Party Ticket. His wife died on 13 December 1988 from Alzheimer's disease.

He died at the age of 96 from a lung ailment. His ashes were scattered over the Bay of Cádiz, the part of the world that mattered most to him.

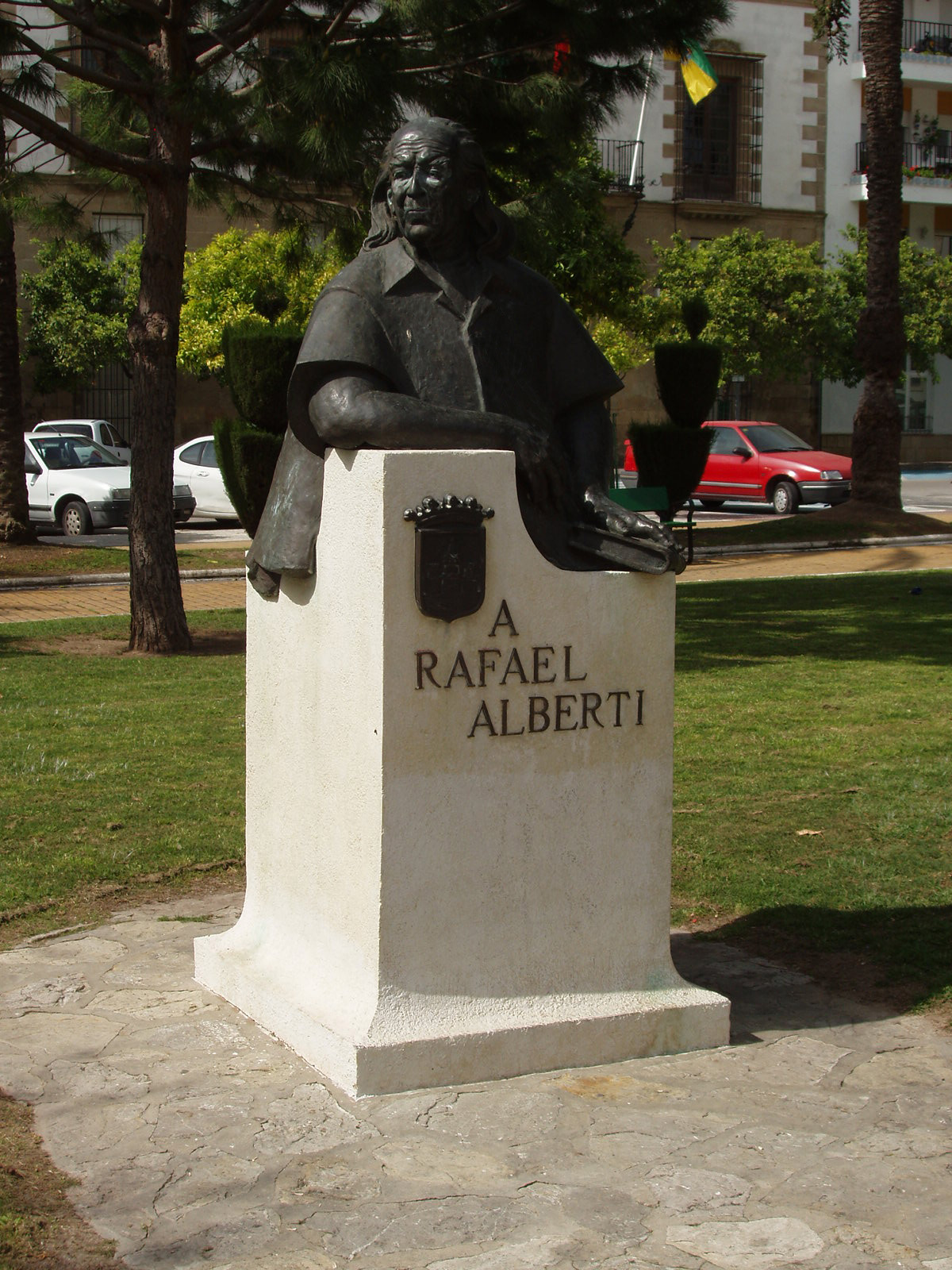
Monument to Alberti in Puerto de Santa María

== Other awards that he earned ==
He was also awarded Lenin Peace Prize for the year 1964 - after lobbying from Pablo Neruda – and Laureate Of The International Botev Prize in 1981. In 1983, he was awarded the Premio Cervantes, the Spanish literary world's highest honour. In 1998, he received the America Award for his lifetime contribution to international writing.

== Poetry ==
=== The early phase ===
Although Marinero en tierra is generally referred to as Alberti's first book, it was in fact his second; an earlier book, Giróscopo ("Gyroscope"), having been lost, although it seems probable that some of its contents were included in a volume of Poesías anteriores a Marinero en tierra ('Poems before Marinero en tierra') that he compiled during his time in Rome. Marinero shows a compendium of different influences: the style of Gil Vicente and the mediaeval cancioneros, to which Alonso had introduced him; a highly organised, formal, baroque style derived from Rubén Darío's Modernismo and ultimately from the poetry of Garcilaso de la Vega, Pedro Espinosa, and possibly Góngora; along with traces of Ultraism. Linking these various influences together are the poet's facility – writing poetry seems to come to him very easily – and an air of naivety and innocence that are in fact carefully contrived. When the book was submitted for the Premio Nacional, the book was called Mar y tierra ("Sea and land") and the title Marinero en tierra was reserved for one single series of poems inside the whole collection. This is the most close-knit series of poems in the entire collection and deserves consideration as a single long poem. It also introduces two enduring themes in his work – his love of his native sea and nostalgia for his childhood. The poems in this sequence are nearly all written in lines of irregular length and irregular assonances and derive most obviously from the cancionero tradition.

La amante (1925) and El alba del alhelí (1926) followed in quick succession. These early works were influenced by traditional songs and folklore. Alberti had settled on a style and was writing fluently within it. He was working on the poems that would form El alba when he was invited by his brother, who had succeeded their father as a wine-salesman, to take a trip with him to the Cantabrian coast. Alberti had never before visited northern Spain and the car-trip through the villages and mountains made a strong impression on him. In La amante, his brother is replaced by the figure of an imaginary girl-friend and he assumes the persona of a troubadour, writing short and generally light-hearted verses about the sights they saw. El alba, on the other hand, was written mainly during holidays he spent with two of his married sisters in Málaga and Rute, a claustrophobic Andalusian mountain village. He had by now met García Lorca and seems to be trying to emulate him. However, what in Lorca is tragic, violent and death-laden tends to seem false and melodramatic in Alberti.

=== Maturity ===
His next collection, Cal y canto (1926–28), is a big departure. He rejects some of the folkloric influences of the previous two works and picks up again the baroque forms, such as the sonnets and tercets, and also the Ultraist thematic material of Marinero. He had been placed in charge of collecting the poems dedicated to Góngora as part of the Tercentenary celebrations and there are many signs of Góngora's influence on this work. Alberti's technical versatility comes to the fore as he writes sonnets, ballads, tercets and even a pastiche of the intricate style of the Soledades. More significantly, there is a sense of unease hanging over the whole collection. Traditional values – myths, religion, convention – are found wanting, but more modern values such as speed, freedom and iconoclasm are also found to be hollow. The nymphs, shepherdesses and mythological figures of renaissance and Baroque poetry are brought into contact with department stores and other aspects of modern life only to appear banal.

There is a sense in this collection that Alberti is writing in this collection as himself, not as the sailor, the troubadour or the tourist of his earlier books. He even wrote a poem about a heroic performance by the goalkeeper of FC Barcelona – "Oda a Platko" – in a match against Real Sociedad in May 1928. "The violence displayed by the Basques was unbelievable," he wrote in his memoirs. "At one desperate moment Platko was attacked so furiously by the players of the Real that he was covered with blood and lost consciousness a few feet from his position, but with his arms still wrapped around the ball."

The most significant poem in the collection is probably the final one, "Carta abierta" ("Open Letter"). He makes it clear that he is writing as Rafael Alberti, child of the Bay of Cádiz and the twentieth century. He contrasts the confinement of the classroom with the freedom of the seashore, the excitement and novelty of the cinema with the boredom of lessons, the conventions of traditional literature and ideas with the revolution of radio, the aeroplane, the telephone. In the confusion caused by the clash of old and new values, the poet has a premonition of the feelings of emptiness and desolation that were soon to assail him but he decides to align with the new.

=== Sobre los ángeles and the works of breakdown ===
Following the sense of unease evident in Cal y canto, Alberti's work became increasingly introspective. During this period, he described himself as deshabitado ("empty"). Biographical accounts have associated this change with an unhappy love affair, as well as other factors, including memories of his childhood, his education at the Jesuit Colegio, the suicide of a friend, financial hardship, strained family relationships, and his continued dependence on poetry as his primary means of livelihood. At the age of 25, he was still living with his family and did not establish an independent household until after meeting María Teresa.

What was I to do? How was I to speak or shout or give form to that web of emotions in which I was caught? How could I stand up straight once again and extricate myself from those catastrophic depths into which I had sunk, submerging and burying myself more and more in my own ruins, covering myself in my own rubble, feeling my insides to be torn and splintered? And then there was a kind of angelic revelation – but not from the corporeal, Christian angels found in all those beautiful paintings and religious icons, but angels representing irresistible forces of the spirit who could be moulded to conform to my darkest and most secret mental states. I released them in waves on the world, a blind reincarnation of all the cruelty, desolation, terror and even at times the goodness that existed inside of me but was also encircling me from without.
I had lost a paradise, the Eden of those early years....

The first section of Sobre los ángeles (1927–28) consists almost entirely of poems on the loss of love and the poet's consequent feeling of being emptied. The metres are short and contain many irregular lines while still retaining an overall regularity of assonance and rhythm. The central section explores a sense of betrayal by religion. His childhood beliefs were dispelled very early by his fanatical aunts and the Jesuits of the Colegio but he still needs to find something to believe in to dispel his feelings of emptiness and rootlessness. The third and final section sees a radical change of style. The short lines of the previous sections give way to much longer lines that grow into the tangled webs of surreal imagery that he was to use in his next few works – Sermones y moradas, Con los zapatos puestos...., and Yo era un tonto....... The key to understanding this collection is probably the poem "Muerte y juicio" ("Death and Judgment"). The child has lost his innocence and belief in a way that was almost predestined before his birth. He recalls one specific incident from his schooldays, when the day-boys played truant and went to the beach to bathe naked and masturbate. They were spotted by a Jesuit teacher and subjected to agonising and humiliating sermons convincing them that they would lose their souls by doing such things.

Sermones y moradas (1929–31) was neither clearly conceived as a unified work nor ever completed. It consists of poems in free verse, full of complex surrealist imagery that is almost impenetrable. They convey an atmosphere of helplessness and total desolation.

Yo era un tonto y lo que he visto me ha hecho dos tontos (1929) is Alberti's homage to the American silent comedians whose films he admired so greatly – Buster Keaton, Harold Lloyd, Harry Langdon etc. Morris has been able to track down some of the specific scenes that inspired these poems but the poems themselves are still in the dense style that Alberti had adopted.

Con los zapatos puestos tengo que morir ("With My Shoes On I Must Die") (1930) – a quote from Calderón – is his final work in this style. Written in the aftermath of the exhilaration of being involved in the anti-Primo de Rivera riots, while still impenetrably dense at times, it shows the beginning of the socially aware poetry that would be the next direction he would take.

=== Poetry of the '30s ===
In July 1936, there was a gathering to hear García Lorca read La casa de Bernarda Alba. Subsequently, Dámaso Alonso recalled that there was a lively discussion about a certain writer - probably Rafael Alberti – who had become deeply involved in politics. "He'll never write anything worthwhile now," was Lorca's comment. This is probably an unduly sweeping comment to make. Alberti's political commitment manifested itself in two distinct ways: an unoriginal party-line verse whose only saving grace is the technical skill and fluency that he could bring to bear even on such routine exercises, and a far more personal poetry in which he draws from his memories and experience to attack the forces of reaction in a more direct, less opaque way than in his earlier collections.

De un momento a otro ("From One Moment to the Next") (1932–38) contains the poem "Colegio (S.J.)", which yet again revisits his memories of his schooldays. Here, however, the Jesuits' treatment of the day-boys is analysed in a way that shows the poet's newly acquired class consciousness – it is depicted as a systematic way of indoctrinating a sense of inferiority.

13 bandas y 48 estrellas ("13 Stripes and 48 Stars") (1935). During the 1930s, Alberti was able to make many journeys under the sponsorship of the Communist Party. This book is an account of a visit to the Caribbean and the US, which gave him ample scope to write poems denouncing capitalism.

Capital de la gloria ("Capital of Glory") (1936–38). This collects the poems that he wrote in commemoration of the siege of Madrid during the Spanish Civil War. It includes heartfelt but dull tributes to various Republican generals and to the International Brigades as well as poems about the peasant-soldiers that can come across at times as patronising. Alberti himself saw little or no action – he was either abroad or in the comparative safety of offices or broadcasting-studios – but there are some forceful poems for reciting to the troops that might have been inspiring. It is also worth noting that this collection shows a return to more tightly disciplined verse forms.

Entre el clavel y la espada ("Between the Carnation and the Sword") (1939–40). This collection gathers the poems that Alberti wrote in France and Argentina at the start of his long exile. It marks a change in style, the feel for a need to regain his discipline as a poet. As a result, it resembles Marinero en tierra in its formal approach – sonnets, cancionero-style poems, etc. A key theme that emerges in this collection is a deep and abiding nostalgia for Spain, the land from which he has been exiled.

=== Later works ===
A la pintura ("On Painting") (1945- ). During his exile, Alberti took up painting again and began a series of poems to draw together his thinking on this subject, to which he continued to add over a period of many years. He wrote a series of sonnets about the raw materials – the retina, the hand, the canvas, the brush, etc.; a series of short poems in free verse about colours; and finally a series of poems in homage to various painters such as Titian, El Greco, etc.

Ora Maritima ("Maritime Shore") (1953). This is a collection dedicated to Cádiz, in recognition of its antiquity. The poems take as their subject-matter the historical and mythological past of the city – Hercules, the Carthaginians etc. – as well as bringing into play the poet's childhood across the bay.

Retornos de lo vivo lejano ("Memories of the Living Distance") (1948–52) and Baladas y canciones de la Paraná ("Ballads and Songs of the Paraná") (1955). These collections contain poems of memory and nostalgia in a highly lyrical style. Once again he recalls his schooldays but this time in a mood of sadness. He also recalls his mother, his friends – especially Vicente Aleixandre who was too ill to leave Madrid during the Civil War – the death of Lorca and he also supplies a moving tribute to his wife.

== Other works ==
Alberti was not especially interested in writing for the theatre but he managed to make a big impact with at least two plays. The first was one of the outputs of his breakdown at the end of the 1920s, El hombre deshabitado ("The Empty Man", 1930). This is like a modern auto sacramental with five characters: Man with his Five Senses in allegorical reincarnation, The Maker, The Wife of Man, and Temptation, the last-named a woman who plots the downfall of both protagonists in complicity with the Senses. On the opening night, 26 February 1931, it met with a stormy reception from a sharply polarised audience.

Shortly afterwards, he began to write a ballad on the life of Fermín Galán, an army captain who had tried to launch a coup to establish a Spanish Republic in December 1930 and who was executed by firing-squad. Alberti converted the ballad into a play, which was performed during June 1931, again to sharply mixed reactions.

His other plays did not achieve such fame or notoriety. They include: De un momento a otro ("From One Moment to Another", 1938–39), El trébol florido ("Clover", 1940), El adefesio ("The Disaster", 1944) and Noche de guerra en el Museo del Prado ("A Night of War in the Prado Museum", 1956), as well as adaptions and other short pieces.

Alberti also wrote several volumes of memoirs under the title La arboleda perdida. Portions have been published in English as The Lost Grove.

== Legacy ==
- There is a Rafael Alberti bookstore in central Madrid, located in the Argüelles district, since 1975.
- A Rafael Alberti Museum that operates as a legacy foundation in the poet's hometown of El Puerto de Santa María, Cádiz.
- The Spanglish novel Yo-Yo Boing! (1998) by Puerto Rican poet Giannina Braschi features a debate about the creators versus the masters of Spanish and Latin American poetry. The debate places Rafael Alberti along with Vicente Aleixandre, Vicente Huidobro, Pedro Salinas, and Jorge Guillén as masters of poetry.

== Poetry collections ==
- Marinero en tierra, M., Biblioteca Nueva, 1925 (Premio Nacional de Literatura).
- La amante, Málaga, Litoral, 1926.
- El alba de alhelí, Santander, 1927 (printed privately by José María de Cossío).
- Domecq (1730–1928). Poema del Ilmo. Sr. Vizconde de Almocadén, Jerez de la Frontera, Jerez Industrial, 1928.
- Cal y canto, M., Revista de Occidente, 1929.
- Yo era un tonto y lo que he visto me ha hecho dos tontos, originally published in various numbers of La Gaceta Literaria, 1929.
- Sobre los ángeles, M., CIAP, 1929.
- El poeta en la calle (1931–1935), Aguilar, Madrid, 1978.
- Consignas, M., 1933.
- Un fantasma recorre Europa, M., La tentativa poética, 1933.
- Poesía (1924–1930), M., Ediciones del Árbol (Cruz y Raya), 1935.
- Versos de agitación, México, Edit. Defensa Roja, 1935.
- Verte y no verte. A Ignacio Sánchez Mejías, México, N. Lira, 1935.
- 13 bandas y 48 estrellas. Poemas del mar Caribe, M., Manuel Altolaguirre, 1936.
- Nuestra diaria palabra, M., Héroe, 1936.
- De un momento a otro (Poesía e historia), M., Europa-América, 1937.
- El burro explosivo, M., Edic. 5º Regimiento, 1938.
- Poesías (1924–1937), M., Signo, 1938.
- Poesías (1924–1938), Bs. As., Losada, 1940.
- Entre el clavel y la espada (1939–1940), Bs. As., Losada, 1941. Illustrations by Rafael Alberti.
- Pleamar (1942–1944), Bs. As., Losada, 1944.
- Poesía (1924–1944), Bs. As., Losada, 1946.
- A la pintura, Bs. As., Imprenta López (Private edition).
- A la pintura. Poema del color y la línea (1945–1948), Bs. As., Losada, 1948.
- Coplas de Juan Panadero. (Libro I), Montevideo, Pueblos Unidos, 1949 (2nd expanded edition). Illustrations by Toño Salazar.
- Poemas de Punta del Este (1945–1956), Ist edition Seix Barral 1979,
- Buenos Aires en tinta china, Bs. As., Losada, 1952. Illustrations by Attilio Rossi.
- Retornos de lo vivo lejano, Bs. As., 1952.
- A la pintura (1945–1952) 2nd augmented edition, Bs. As., Losada, 1953.
- Ora marítima seguido de Baladas y canciones del Paraná (1953), Bs. As., Losada, 1953.
- Redoble lento por la muerte de Stalin, (Buenos Aires, 9 de marzo de 1953). Included in Obras completas. Poesía III. Seix Barral. 2003.
- Baladas y canciones del Paraná, Bs. As., Losada, 1954.
- Sonríe China, Bs. As., Jacobo Muchnik, 1958 (in collaboration with María Teresa León).
- Poemas escénicos, Bs. As., Losada, 1962 (2nd expanded bilingual edition Spanish/Italian).
- Abierto a todas horas, M., Afrodisio Aguado, 1964.
- El poeta en la calle (1931–1965), París, Librairie du Globe, 1966 (Compilation of all Alberti's social poetry).
- Il mattatore, Roma, Eutro edit, 1966.
- A la pintura. Poema del color y la línea (1945–1967) 3rd augmented edition, M., Aguilar, 1968 (Prologue by Vicente Aleixandre).
- Roma, peligro para caminantes, México, Joaquín Mortiz, 1968 (2nd augmented edition - Málaga- Litoral- 1974).
- Los 8 nombres de Picasso y no digo más que lo que no digo, B., Kairós, 1970.
- Canciones del Alto Valle del Aniene, Bs. As., Losada, 1972.
- Disprezzo e meraviglia (Desprecio y maravilla), Roma, Riuniti, 1972 (Bilingual Italian/Spanish. Anthology with unpublished poems).
- Maravillas con variaciones acrósticas en el jardín de Miró, B., Polígrafa, 1975.
- Coplas de Juan Panadero (1949–1977), M., Mayoría, 1977.
- Cuaderno de Rute (1925), Málaga, Litoral, 1977.
- Los 5 destacagados, Sevilla, Calle del Aire, 1978.
- Fustigada luz, B., Seix Barral, 1980.
- Versos sueltos de cada día, B., Seix Barral, 1982.
- Golfo de Sombras, M., Villamonte, 1986.
- Los hijos del drago y otros poemas, Granada, Diputación, 1986.
- Accidente. Poemas del Hospital, Málaga, Librería Anticuaria El Guadalhorce, 1987.
- Cuatro canciones, Málaga, Librería Anticuaria El Guadalhorce, 1987.
- Canciones para Altair, M., Hiperión, 1989.

== Complete Works ==
- Poesía I. (1920-1930). Edited by Jaime Siles, with critical contributions by Gonzalo Santonja (Seix Barral, 2003)
- Poesía II. (1930-1940). Edited by Robert Marrast with critical contributions by Gonzalo Santonja (Seix Barral, 2003)
- Poesía III. (1941-1960). All Alberti's poetry from his American exile up to the year of his return to Europe. Edited by Jaime Siles, with critical contributions by Gonzalo Santonja (Seix Barral, 2003)
- Poesía IV. (1961-1988). Edited by José María Balcells with critical contributions by Gonzalo Santonja. (Seix Barral, 2003)
- Teatro I. (1926-1937). Edited by Eladio Mateos Miera with critical contributions by Gonzalo Santonja (Seix Barral, 2003)
- Prosa II. Memorias. Edited by Robert Marrast (Seix Barral, 2003)

== See also ==
- Museo Fundación Rafael Alberti
- Spanish poetry
