= Andalusia Day =

Public holiday in Andalusia, Spain

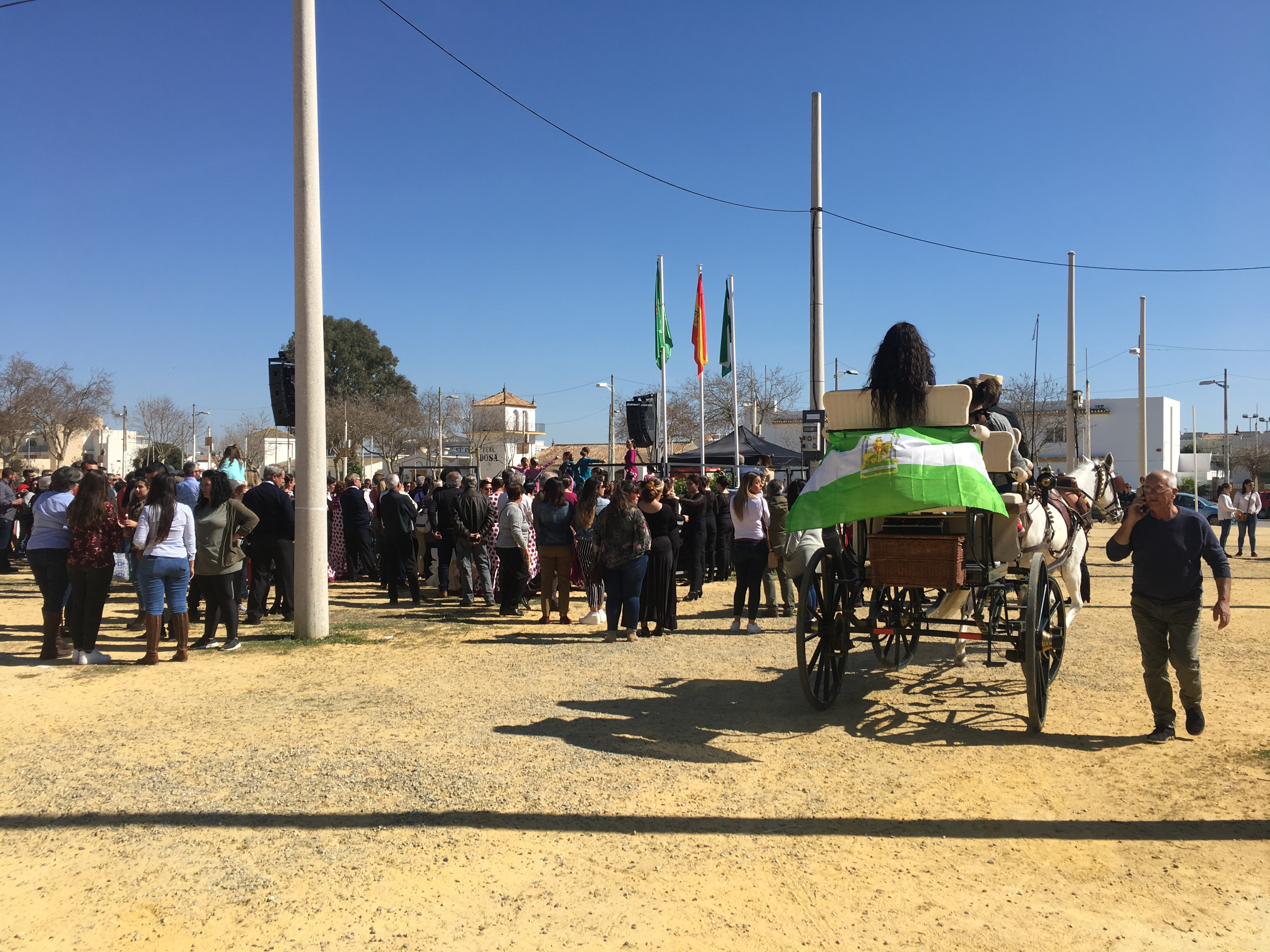
Andalusia Day celebration in Rota on February 28, 2019

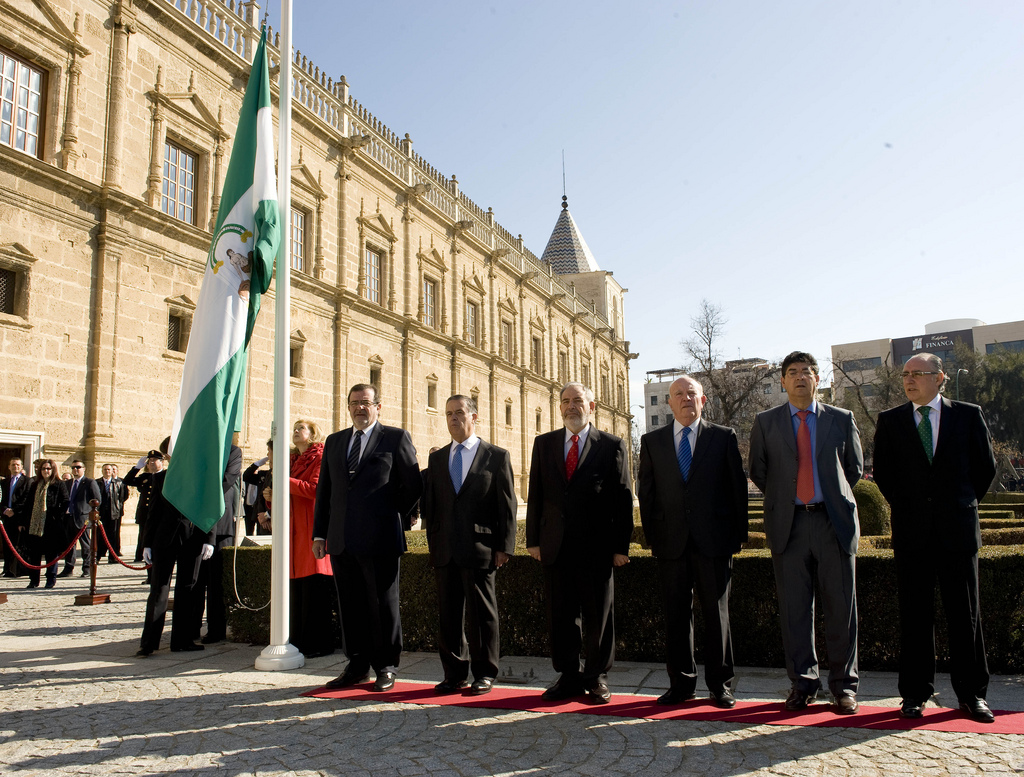
Parliament, Andalusia Day, 2012

The Andalusia Day (Spanish: Día de Andalucía) is celebrated on 28 February and commemorates the 28 February 1980 referendum on the Statute of Autonomy of Andalusia, in which the Andalusian electorate voted for the statute that made Andalusia an autonomous community of Spain.

== Customs ==
In many municipalities and cities of Andalusia, people decorate their balconies with the regional flag of Andalusia and with bunting echoing its green-and-white bars. Cultural competitions are often held in conjunction with the day. In some cities, especially in the Málaga area, schools are closed for a Semana Cultural ("cultural week"), also known as Semana Blanca ("white week"). The Friday before is often a day of celebration in schools with a traditional Andalusian breakfast (desayuno andaluz), consisting of a slice of toast with a thin layer of olive oil and orange juice; students colour pictures that refer to the symbols and insignia of Andalusia, its history and customs, put on plays and sing the national anthem, the Himno de Andalucía.

== Historic observances ==
=== 2007 ===
The holiday in 2007 included a plenary session of the Parliament of Andalusia at the Teatro de la Maestranza in Seville to grant that year's honour of Hijo Predilecto de Andalucía ("Favourite son of Andalusia") to José Saramago and the Medal of Andalusia to Miguel Báez Espuny 'El Litri', Real Betis Balompié, Carlos Cabezas Jurado, Bernardo Rodríguez Arias, Felipe Reyes Cabañas, Juana Castro, Ramón Contreras, María García Torrecillas, Eva Garrido ('La Yerbabuena'), Rafael Martos Sánchez ('Raphael') and Javier Ruibal.

== See also ==
- Andalusian nationalism
