= Albanchez =

- Municipality
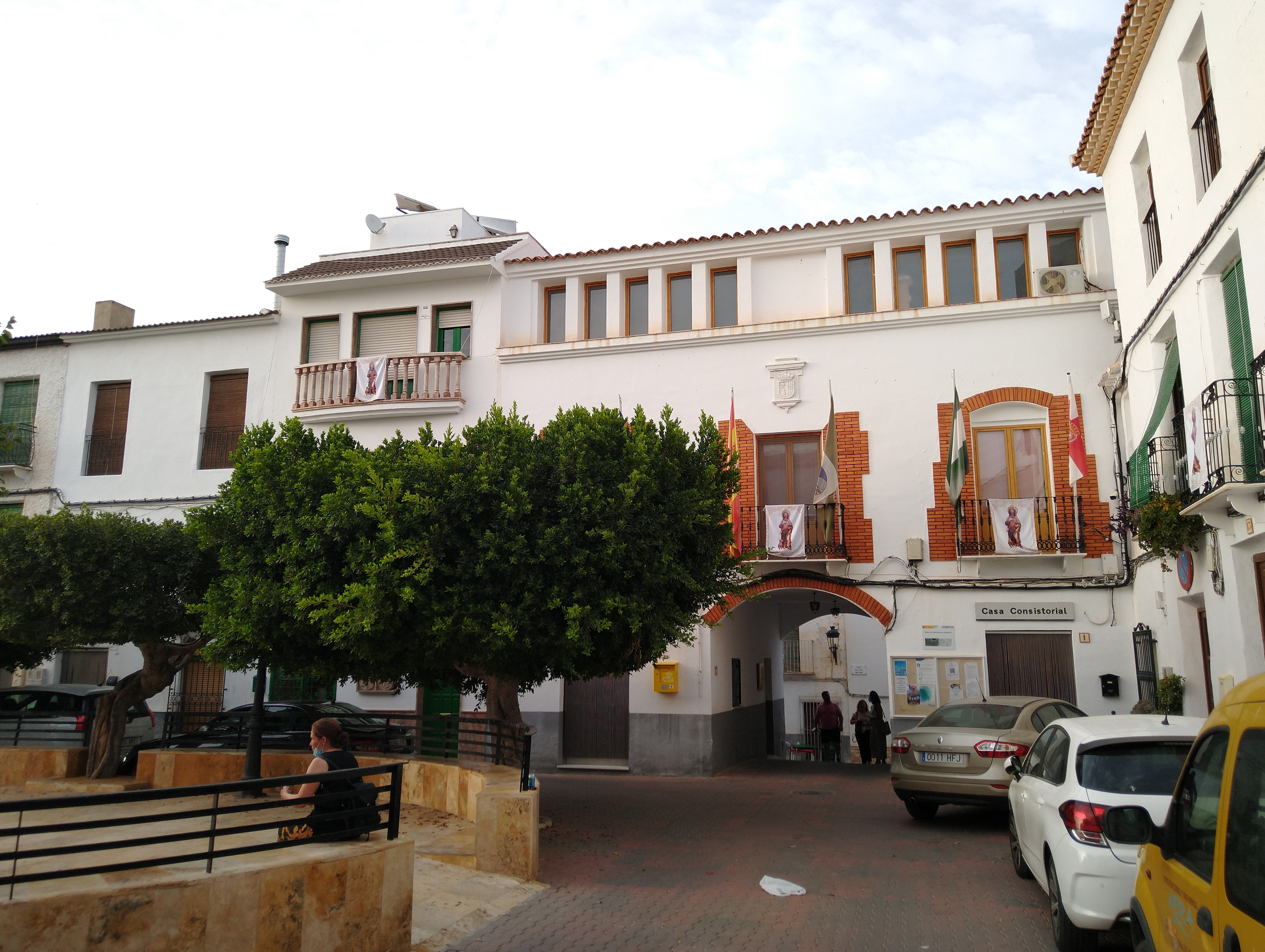
- Town hall

- Flag Seal

- Location within Spain
- Coordinates: 37°17′13.7″N 2°11′01.2″W
- Country: Spain
- A. community: Andalucía
- Province: Almería

Government
  - Mayor: Amador López

Area
  - Total: 34.91 km^{2} (13.48 sq mi)

Population (January 1, 2021)
  - Total: 720
  - Density: 20.62/km^{2} (53.4/sq mi)
- Time zone: UTC+01:00
- Postal code: 04857
- MCN: 04004
- Website: Official website

Albanchez is a municipality of Almería province, in Spain.

== Demographics ==
Historical population
Year	Pop.	±%
1999	605	—
2000	586	−3.1%
2001	575	−1.9%
2002	585	+1.7%
2003	638	+9.1%
2004	697	+9.2%
2005	681	−2.3%
2006	660	−3.1%
2007	697	+5.6%
2008	726	+4.2%
2009	815	+12.3%
2010	814	−0.1%
2011	823	+1.1%
2012	774	−6.0%
2013	648	−16.3%
2014	772	+19.1%
2015	805	+4.3%
2016	796	−1.1%
2017	754	−5.3%
2018	753	−0.1%
2019	741	−1.6%
Source: INE (Spain)

== See also ==
- List of municipalities in Almería
