= Manuel Andújar (writer) =

Spanish novelist, playwright, poet and essayist

Manuel Andújar Muñoz
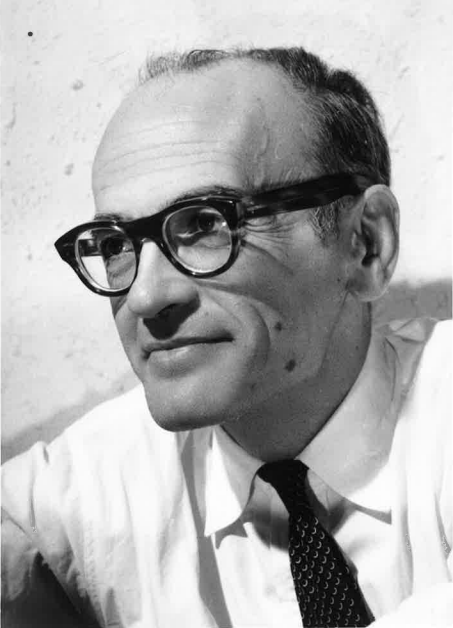
- Born: 4 January 1913; La Carolina, province of Jaén, Spain
- Died: 14 April 1994 (aged 81); Madrid, Spain
- Occupation: Writer

Manuel Andújar Muñoz (4 January 1913 – 14 April 1994) was a Spanish novelist, playwright, poet and essayist.

== Early life and education ==
The first years of his life were spent in La Carolina, Linares, and Málaga. At Malaga, he studied at the German College and later at the School of Commerce, studies which were interrupted by the illness poliomyelitis; he published his first articles in literary criticism. In 1932, he arrived in Madrid, where he completed his studies in professional accountancy. He transferred to Lérida and then Barcelona at the end of 1935, where he worked as an administrator. He secretly served in the Communist Party. During the Civil War, he worked as a journalist. After spending time in the concentration camp of Saint-Cyprien (France), he came to Veracruz (Mexico) in the Sinaia. He remained until 1967, with brief stays in other countries of Hispanoamerica and a whole year (from 1956 to 1957) in Santiago de Chile.

In Mexico, he began working at an import business, translating correspondence into English and French. He also worked in publicity, founding, together with José Ramón Arana, the magazine The Spaniards, a meeting place for expatriate Spanish writers and poets who came to fill the void left by the ephemeral publications The Wandering Spaniard of Jose Bergamín and Romance of the poet Juan Rejano.

Andújar then wrote his books of poetry, his first dramatic works, and his narrative trilogy The Days Before, about the period preceding the Civil War, with, as Rafael Conte has observed, a style inspired by Benito Peréz Galdós, but submitted to an artistic and stylistic purification. He worked as a press correspondent and in a watch-making company, which connected him with the world of radio and publicity. In 1946, he was nominated director of promotions and publicity of the Juárez Book Company and of the famous Mexican editorial The Economic Culture Fund, labors in which he remained for eleven years.

== Career ==
In Mexico, he achieved repute in his vocation as a writer by writing a work that ethically and historically repudiated violence. He associated with a large number of journalists and writers. He published various works in 1967 on his return to Spain, where he combined his efforts as a writer with his work in Editorial Alliance. He was nominated Favorite Son of Andalusia in 1985 and died in Madrid in 1994. His file is currently found in the Documentary Archive of Themes and Authors in Jaén of the Provincial Delegation of Jaén.

Manuel Andújar wrote various novels, stories, poetry, theatre, and essays, but his work was not edited in Spain until 1986, the year in which Alfaguara took the first step upon returning from exile, and now in Jaén, where he left a large part of his work to the Jaén Documentary Archive of Themes and Authors of the Delegation. In his work, he fundamentally emphasized two narrative trilogies and various novels that integrate a lengthy narrative mosaic of the Spanish 20th century, which the author entitled Lares and Penates. He began with his first novel, Fractured Crystal (1945). He followed with two trilogies: Eves and Histories of a History, which narrate, respectively, the occurrences before the Civil War through internal histories and the war itself. His trilogy The Days Before tells of the prewar civil environment through three novels set in the country, the mines, and the sea. It opens with The Plain (1947), the story of a family entrenched in La Mancha, in fact in a pueblo, "Las Encinas", likely an imitation of the Spanish municipality Viso del Marqués. The mother, Gabriela, defends the family after the local overlords murder the father, until her youngest son relieves her. When the situation seems to improve, the mayor's assassination makes Benito abandon Las Encinas. The alternation of paragraphs between first and third person enlivens the story and its slow tempo confers a notable lyricism. That same Manchegan setting appears again in the stories grouped under the title, Of the Fertile Plain and the Pueblo. The trilogy continues with The Conquered (1949), about the world of the miners, and finishes with The Destiny of Lazarus (1959), centered on the sea. Another of his trilogies was Histories of a History (1973, censured version, and 1986, complete version). He completed the novelistic cycle of Andújar with the novels The Voice and the Blood (1984) and Appointment of Ghosts (1984).

== Body of work ==
- Narrations, 1989
- The Correct Image, 1961
- Bell and Chain, 1965
- Dates of a Return
- Feelings and Desires, 1984
- The First Last Judgement
- The Anniversaries
- The Stolen Dream, 1962
- Fractured Crystal (1945)
- The Plain (1947)
- The Conquered (1949)
- The Destiny of Lazarus (1959)
- Histories of a History (1973, censured version, and 1986, complete version)
- The Voice and the Blood (1984)
- Appointment of Ghosts (1989)
- Magic Date (1989)
- Narrative of the Spanish Exile and Latin American Literature, 1974
- Catalan Literature in Exile
- Andalusia and Hispanoamerica: Crucible of Cross-Breedings
- Exclamation Points (1986)
- Empty Places (1971)
- The Luminous Strip (1973)
- Secret Predictions
- Parting from Anguish (1944)
- Saint-Cyprien, plague. Concentration Camp (1942)
- The Shadow of the Beam (1968)
- Everything is Foreseen
- A Gentleman With A Saffron Beard (1992)
- Letters are Letters, collected letters
