= Puerto Real Campus =

Coordinates: 36°31′48″N 6°12′42″W

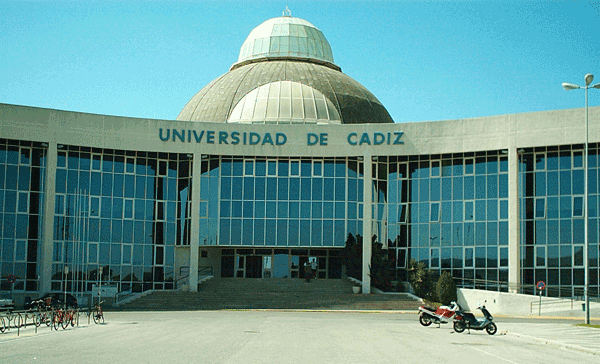
Andalusian Higher Center for Marine Studies.

The Puerto Real Campus is one of the four campuses of the University of Cádiz. It is located in the municipality of Puerto Real (Cádiz), near the San Pedro River and the neighborhood of the same name.

The campus is situated within the Bay of Cádiz Natural Park, making it the only "natural" university campus in Spain. It is well connected by bus and commuter trains to Cádiz and surrounding towns such as Jerez, Sanlúcar, Chipiona, Arcos, and the white villages of the mountains.

== Facilities ==
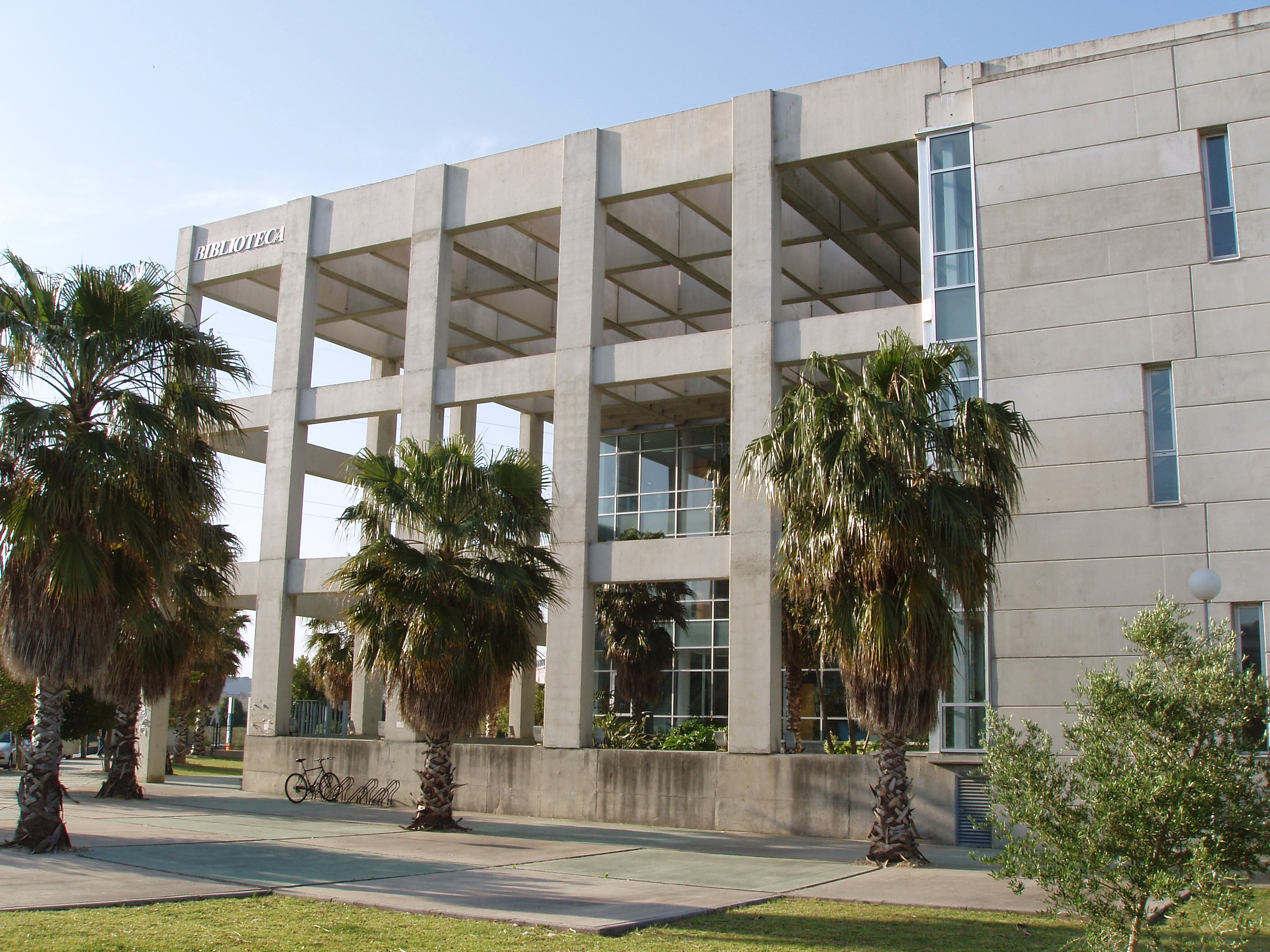
Puerto Real Campus Library.

The campus houses the following academic and research institutions:

- Faculty of Educational Sciences (formerly the School of Teacher Training)
- Faculty of Sciences
- Andalusian Higher Center for Marine Studies, which includes:

 ** Faculty of Nautical Sciences
 ** Faculty of Marine and Environmental Sciences
 ** University School of Naval Technical Engineering (formerly the School of Naval Experts)

- Higher School of Engineering (ESI)
- Andalusian Research Center for Viticulture
- Higher School of Engineering (located near the campus in Las Aletas)
- Integrated Information Technology Center
- Centralized Library
- Sports Pavilion

The University of Cádiz is the only university in Andalusia, and one of the few in Spain, that offers degrees in Nautical Sciences, Naval Technical Engineering, and Marine Sciences.

The Andalusian Higher Center for Marine Studies (CASEM) is the largest building on campus, located at its center. It features a double dome housing a planetarium and a study room.

== Degree Programs ==
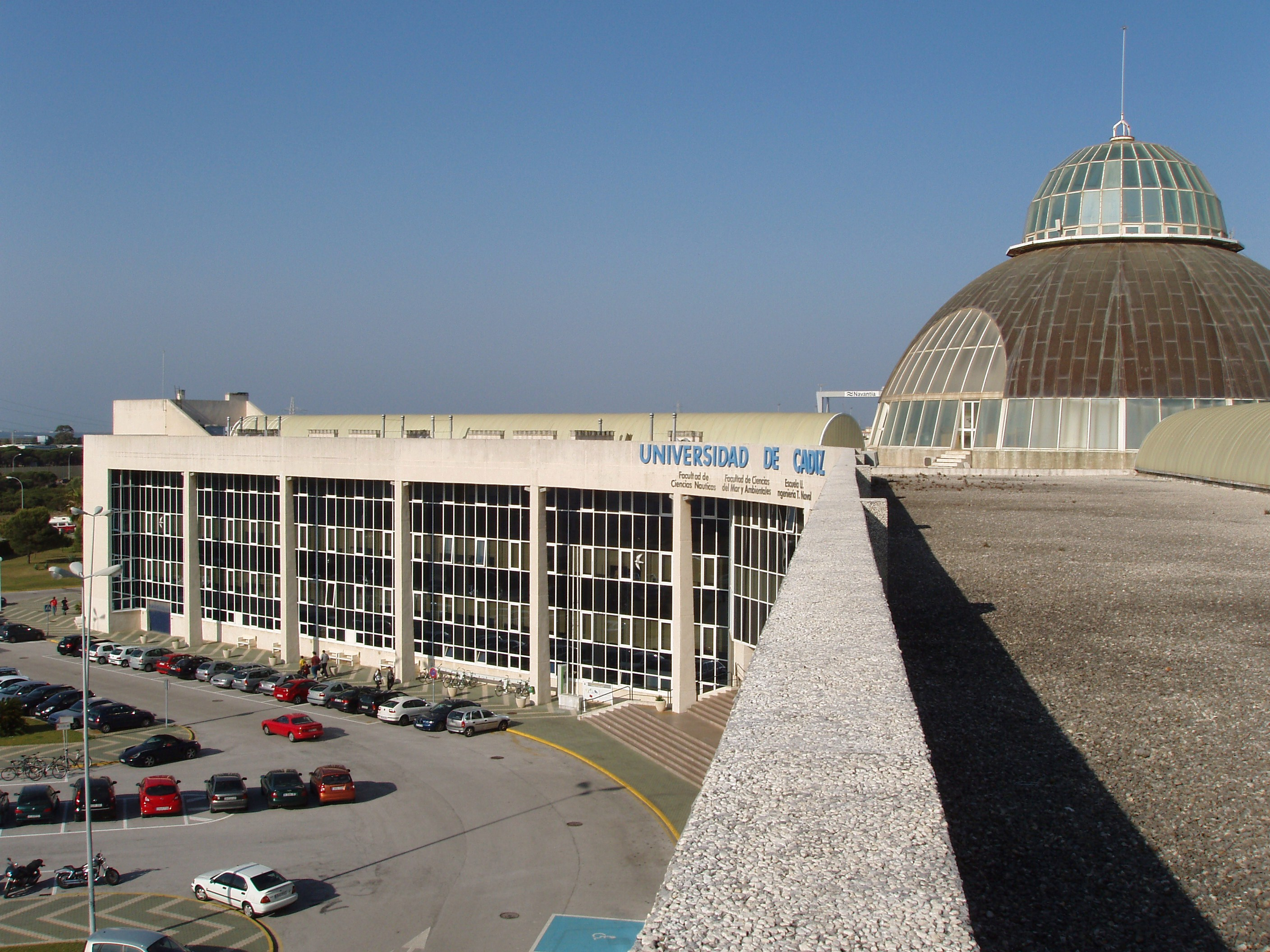
Campus from the roof of CASEM

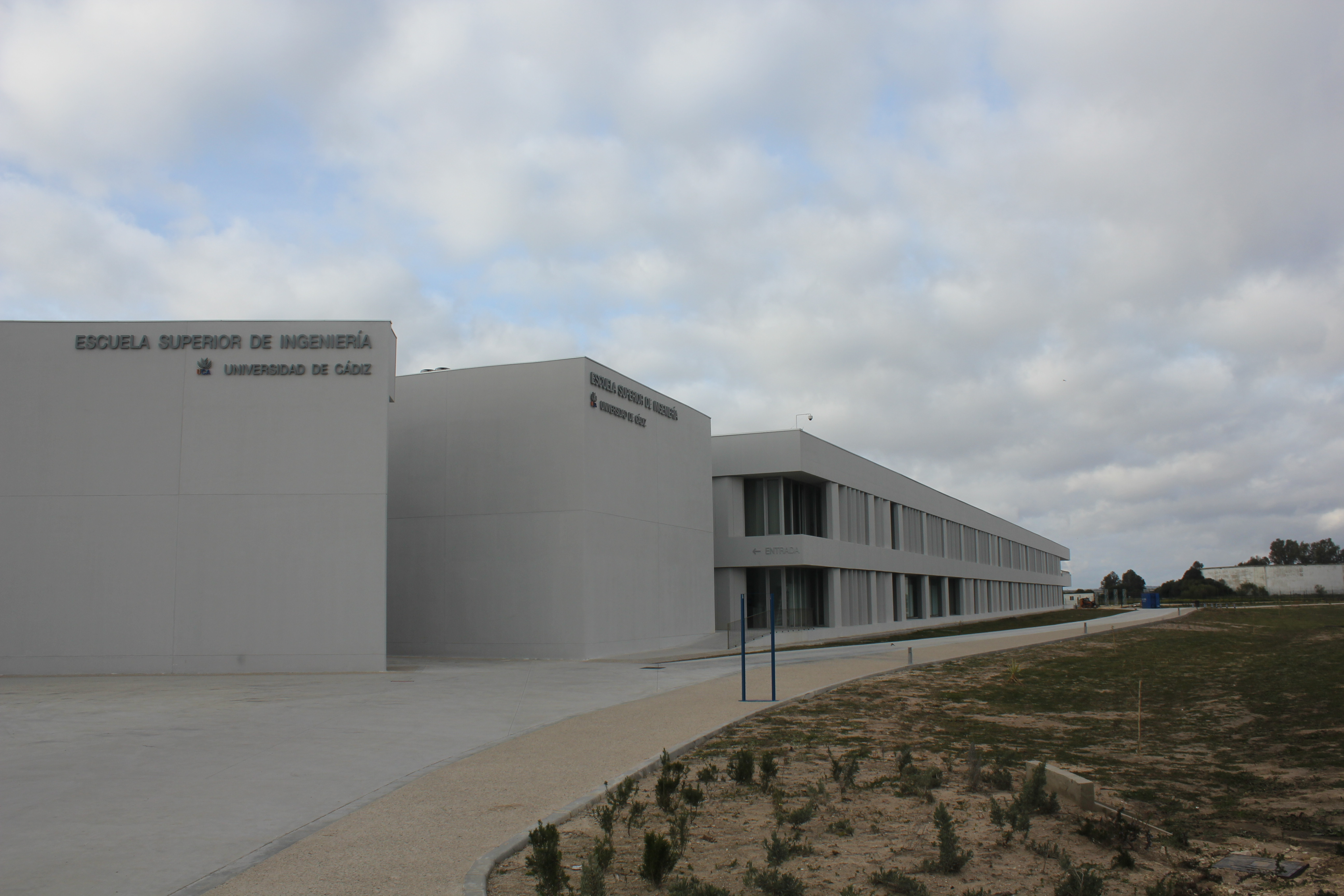
Higher School of Engineering

The following degrees are offered at the Puerto Real Campus:

- Degree in Radioelectronic Engineering
- Degree in Nautical Engineering and Maritime Transport
- Degree in Naval Architecture and Maritime Engineering (available as a double major)
- Degree in Biotechnology
- Degree in Chemical Engineering
- Degree in Computer Engineering
- Degree in Aerospace Engineering
- Degree in Industrial Technologies Engineering
- Degree in Mechanical Engineering
- Degree in Electrical Engineering
- Degree in Industrial Design and Product Development Engineering
- Degree in Industrial Electronics Engineering
- Degree in Psychology
- Degree in Chemistry
- Degree in Mathematics
- Degree in Oenology
- Degree in Marine Sciences
- Degree in Environmental Sciences
- Degree in Nautical Sciences and Maritime Transport
- Degree in Naval Machinery
- Degree in Naval Radioelectronics
- Diploma in Naval Machinery
- Diploma in Maritime Navigation
- Diploma in Naval Radioelectronics
- Naval Technical Engineer, Marine Structures
- Naval Technical Engineer, Propulsion and Ship Services
- Bachelor's Degree in Early Childhood Education
- Bachelor's Degree in Primary Education
- Bachelor's Degree in Foreign Language Education
- Bachelor's Degree in Physical Education
- Bachelor's Degree in Music Education
- Bachelor's Degree in Special Education
- Bachelor's Degree in Hearing and Language Education
- Double Degree in Early Childhood Education and Foreign Language Education
- Graduate Degree in Psychopedagogy

== Research Centers ==
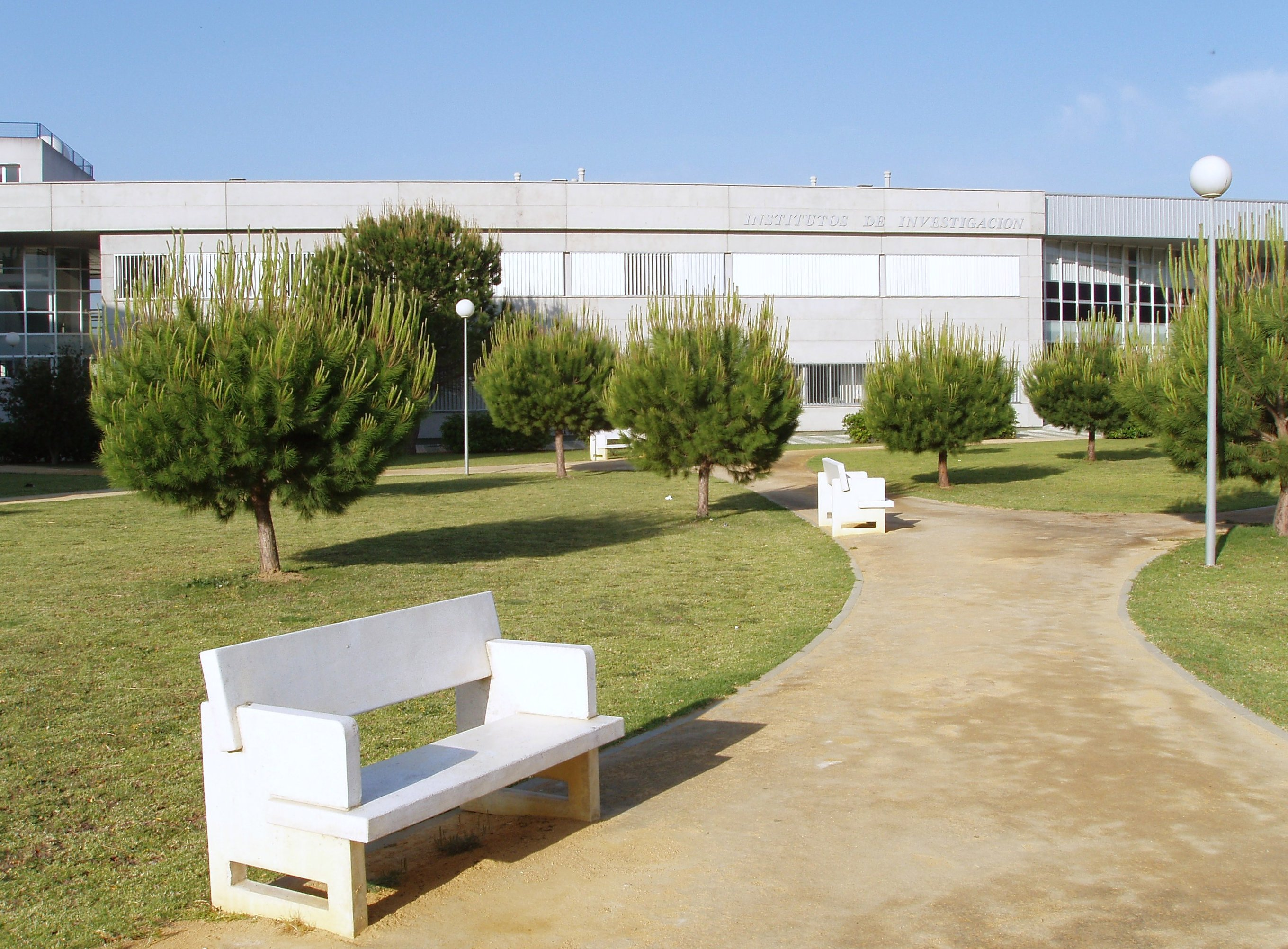
Research building

The campus is home to the following research centers, which are jointly operated by the University of Cádiz and the Junta de Andalucía:

- Andalusian Center for Marine Science and Technology (CACYTMAR)
- Andalusian Centre for Viticultural Research (CAIV), part of the Ibero-American Viticulture Network
