= Church of San Pedro =

Church in Seville, Spain

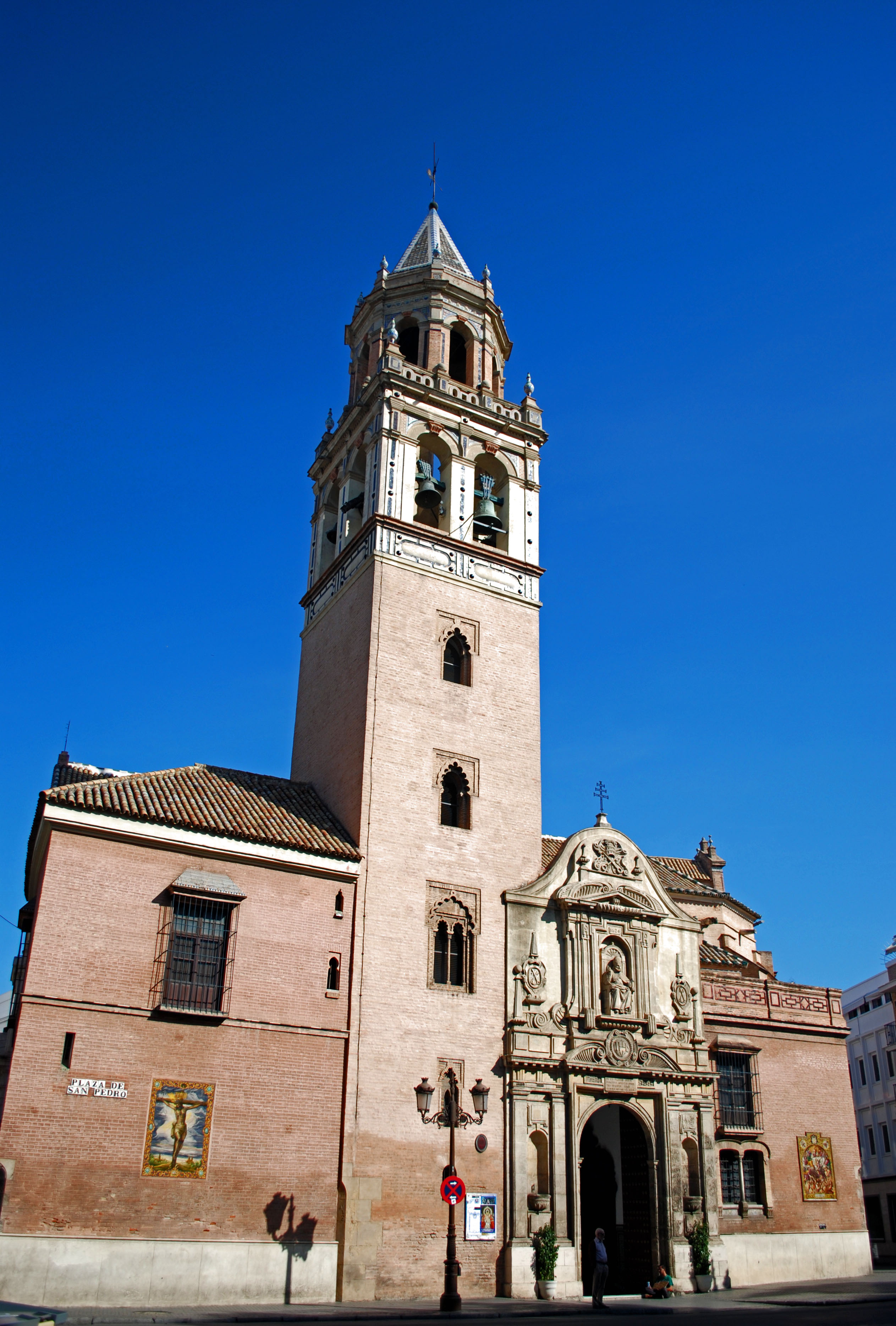
- Church of San Pedro
- 37°23′34.21″N 5°59′29.00″W
- Location: Seville
- Country: Spain
- Denomination: Catholic Church
- Sui iuris church: Latin Church
- Website: www.sanpedrosevilla.org

Architecture
- Architectural type: Church
- Style: Gothic, Mudéjar

The Church of San Pedro (Spanish: Iglesia de San Pedro) or St. Peter's Church is a Gothic-Mudéjar style Catholic church built in the 14th century and renovated in the 16th and 18th centuries. It is located in San Pedro Square in Seville, Spain and serves as the seat of the parish of San Pedro and San Juan Bautista.

Spanish Baroque painter Diego Velázquez was baptized here in 1599.

== Description ==
The building consists of three naves, two entrances, and a bell tower. In front of the church, there is a statue of Angela of the Cross.

=== Entrances ===
The main entrance on Santa Ángela de la Cruz street was erected in 1612 and designed by Vermondo Resta.

There are two tile paintings on either side of the main entrance. One of the paintings is of the "Blessed Souls of Purgatory". A panel beneath the painting explains that the person who finds the goldfinch (Spanish: el pajarito de San Pedro) hidden in the painting and says a prayer will get married soon.

=== Interior ===
The main altarpiece was made by Felipe de Ribas between 1641 and 1657. The altarpiece was restored in late 2015.
