= Gonzalo Santonja =

Spanish writer and politician

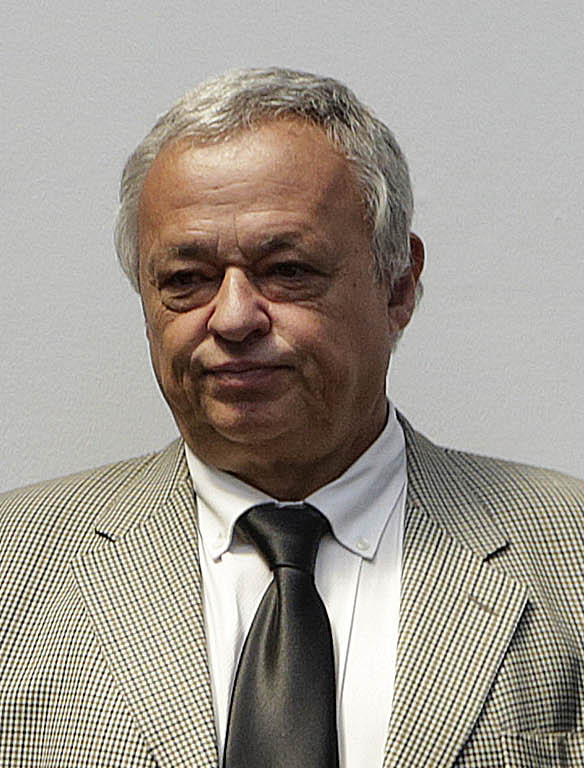

Gonzalo Santonja Gómez-Agero (born 12 October 1952) is a Spanish writer, politician, professor, and literary critic who, since 2022, has served as Minister of Culture, Tourism, and Sport in the Junta of Castile and León, as an appointee of Vox.

== Biography ==
Born in Béjar, Province of Salamanca, Santonja was active in the Communist Party of Spain (PCE) in his youth, for which he was arrested in the late years of Francoist Spain. He fled to France but moved back soon after, stating that he could not stand the French people. In the 1970s, he also expressed sympathy for Herri Batasuna, the political arm of ETA. He was a close friend of communist poet Rafael Alberti and an advisor to his eponymous foundation. He married Dolores Grimau, whose father Julián Grimau was executed by Franco in 1963 for running the PCE's clandestine activities in Spain.

He is a member of the Academia Argentina de Letras, the North American Academy of the Spanish Language and the Philippine Academy of the Spanish Language. He has written over 30 books of essays and five on the history of bullfighting, a practice that he supports. He has been a professor at the Complutense University of Madrid and director of the Instituto Castellano y Leonés de la Lengua.

In March 2022, he was named Minister of Culture, Tourism, and Sport in the Junta of Castile and León, by Vox, the junior partner in the People's Party-led second government of Alfonso Fernández Mañueco. In July 2024, Vox national leader Santiago Abascal severed all the party's coalitions with the PP in a dispute over housing of unaccompanied migrant minors; Santonja remained in office while three Vox ministers resigned.
