= University of Cádiz =

Spanish public university

Coordinates: 36.534°N 6.303°W

- Universidad de Cádiz
- Motto: Non Plus Ultra (Latin)
- Motto in English: No Further Beyond
- Type: Public
- Established: 1979
- Rector: Eduardo González Mazo
- Students: 20,798
- Location: Cádiz, Spain
- Campus: Cádiz Puerto Real Algeciras Jerez de la Frontera
- Website: www.uca.es

University rankings

Global – Overall
- ARWU World: 901–1000 (2023)
- THE World: 1001–1200 (2024)
- USNWR Global: =1190 (2023)

The University of Cádiz (in Spanish: Universidad de Cádiz), commonly referred to as UCA, is a public university located in the province of Cádiz, Andalusia, Spain, noted for its medicine and marine sciences curricula. It was founded in 1979, and has the Latin motto Non Plus Ultra ("No Further Beyond"). Its headquarters are located in Cádiz, where the Rectorate is. During the 2007/2008 academic year, there were 17,280 students, 1,698 lecturers, and 680 administration and services workers associated with the university.

== History ==
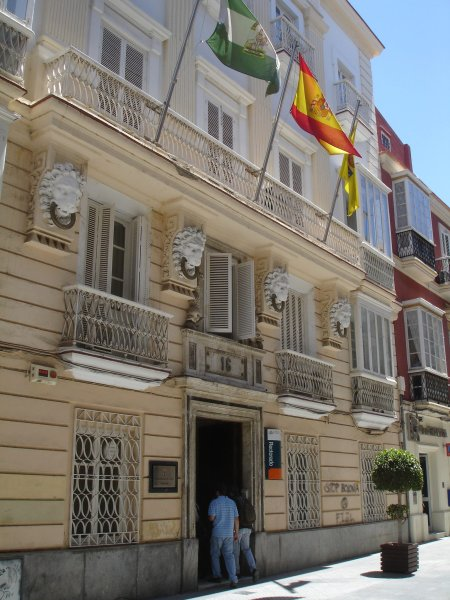
Casa de los 5 Gremios, today the University Main Building

The University's origins lie in the 15th century with the "Colegio de Pilotos de los Mares de Levante y Poniente".

Its Faculty of Medicine traces its founding to the Royal Naval College of Surgery in 1748, which was the first in Europe to combine medicine and surgery in a single school.

The modern University of Cádiz was founded on October 30, 1979, with an inaugural session "Cajal, análisis literario de un carácter" about Ramón y Cajal and the first rector election was conducted in 1984.

In March 1984, the Gold Medal was awarded to Juan Carlos I of Spain. In May 1985, Rafael Alberti and Antonio Domínguez Ortiz were invested Doctor Honoris Causa. In this year, the rectorate is relocated to the current building, Casa de los Cinco Gremios. University bylaws and statutes were approved in February 1986.

In 1992, Centro Andaluz Superior de Estudios Marinos was inaugurated in Campus of Puerto Real.

Since 2003, UCA has promoted new technologies for learning-related purposes, first with WebCT virtual campus and then Moodle (free software).

In 2009, the recently created "General Inspection of Exceptional Services" begun to make decisions which were severely reprobed by some intellectual authors, for it allows authorities the use of official means in order to arbitrarily punish teaching staff.

== Campuses ==
In addition to the principal campus in Cádiz, the university has three satellite campuses:

- Bahía de Algeciras Campus
- Jerez de la Frontera Campus
- Campus of Puerto Real: near to Bahía de Cádiz Natural Park. The main building is the Centro Andaluz Superior de Estudios Marinos; CASEM which offers studies in Marine Environment and Marine Resources, Seafaring, Marine Engineering, Naval Radioelectronics and Naval Engineering.
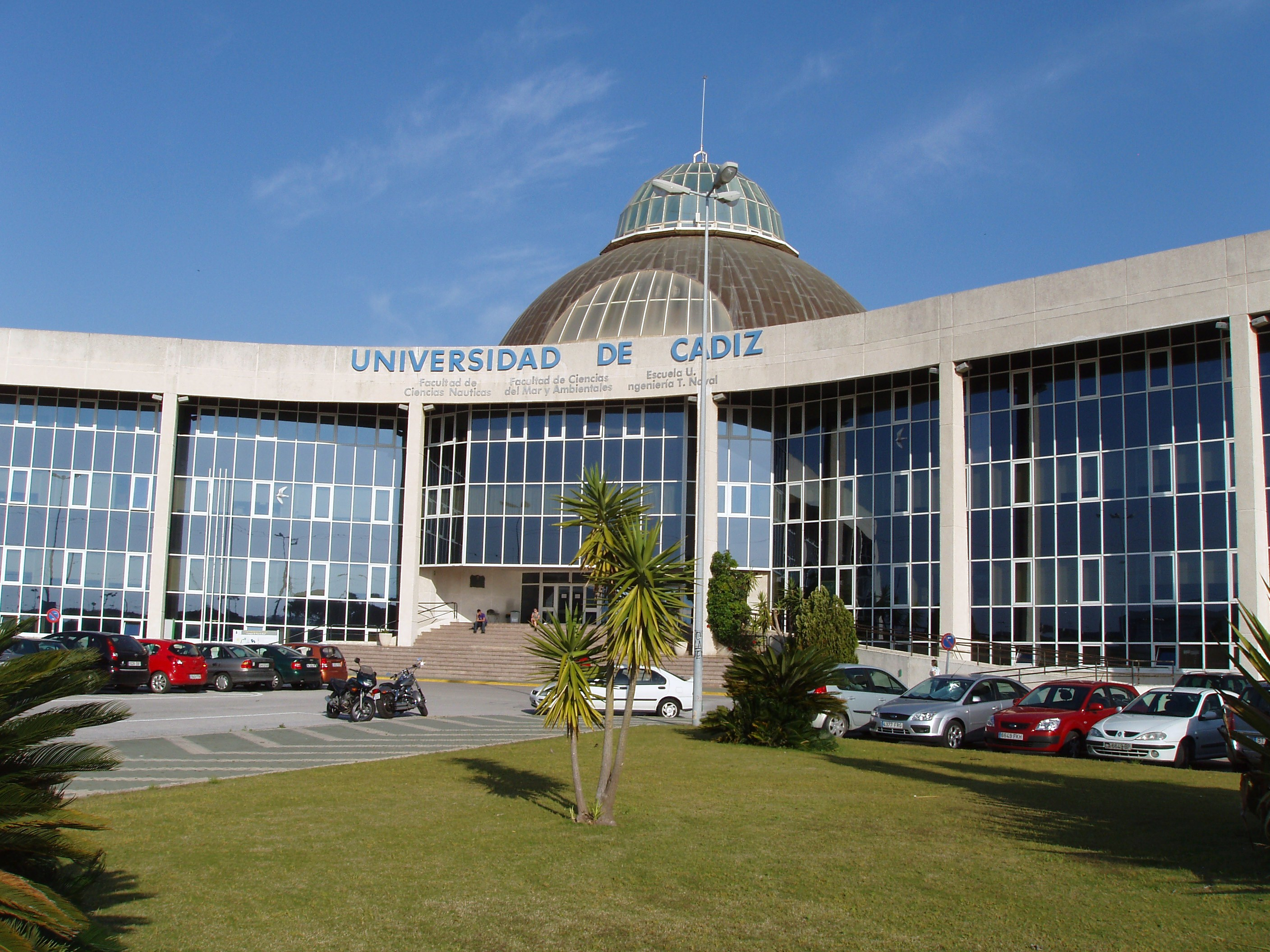
CASEM, Campus of Puerto Real

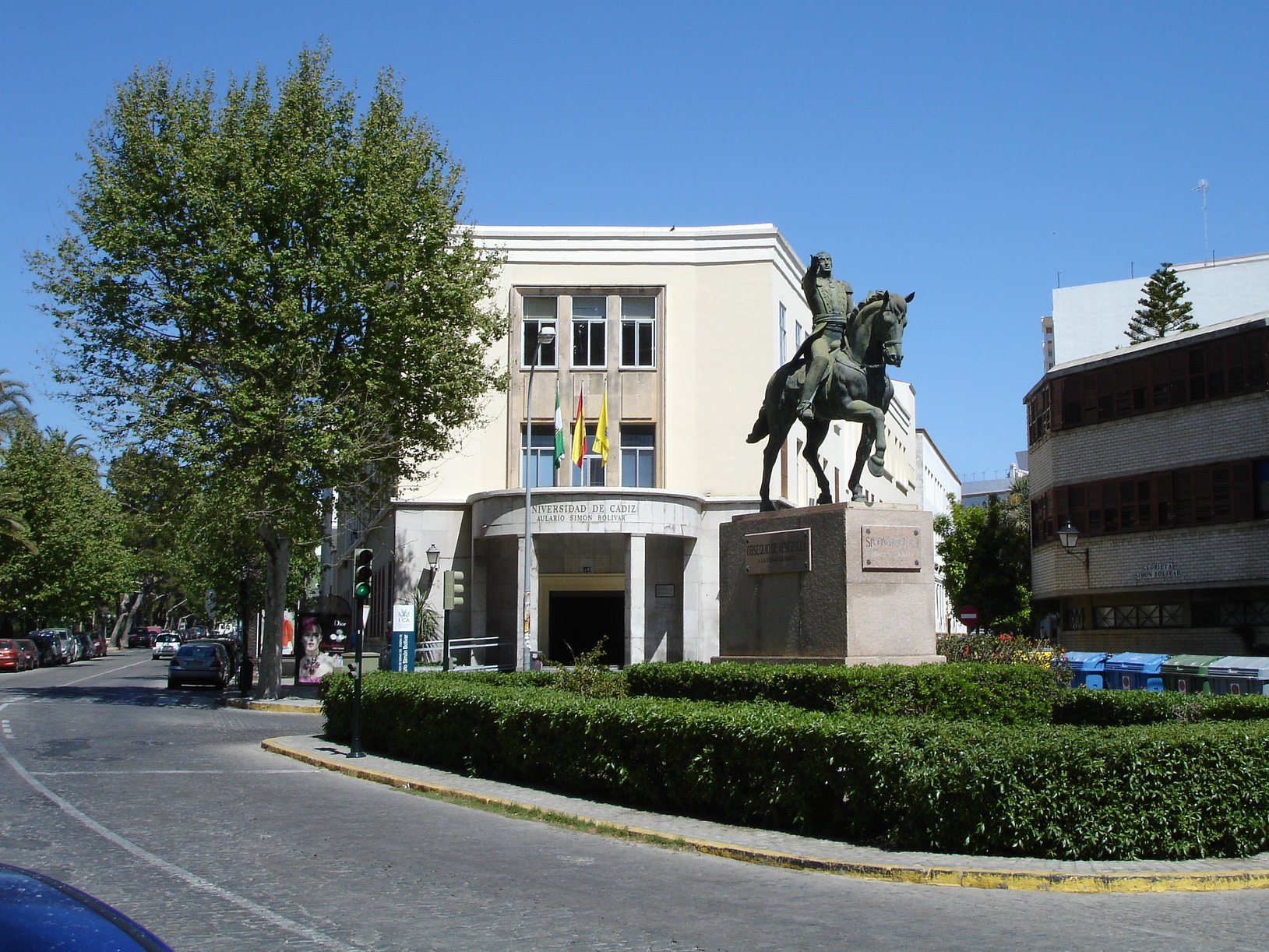
School of Engenieering, Cádiz Campus

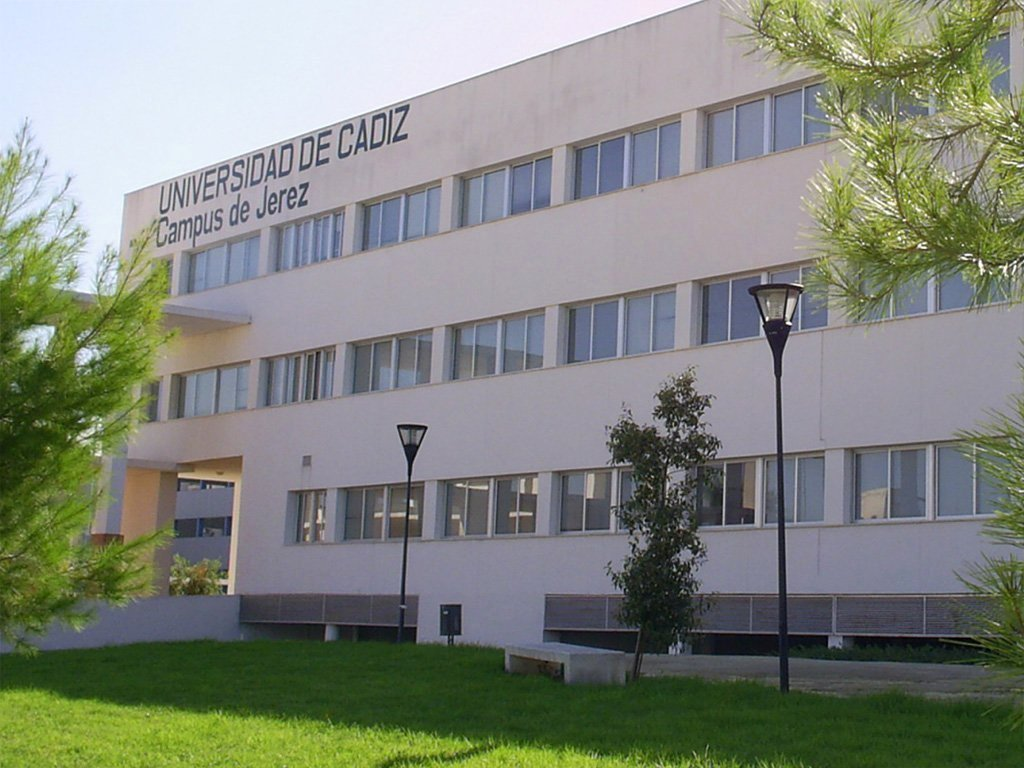
Jerez Campus

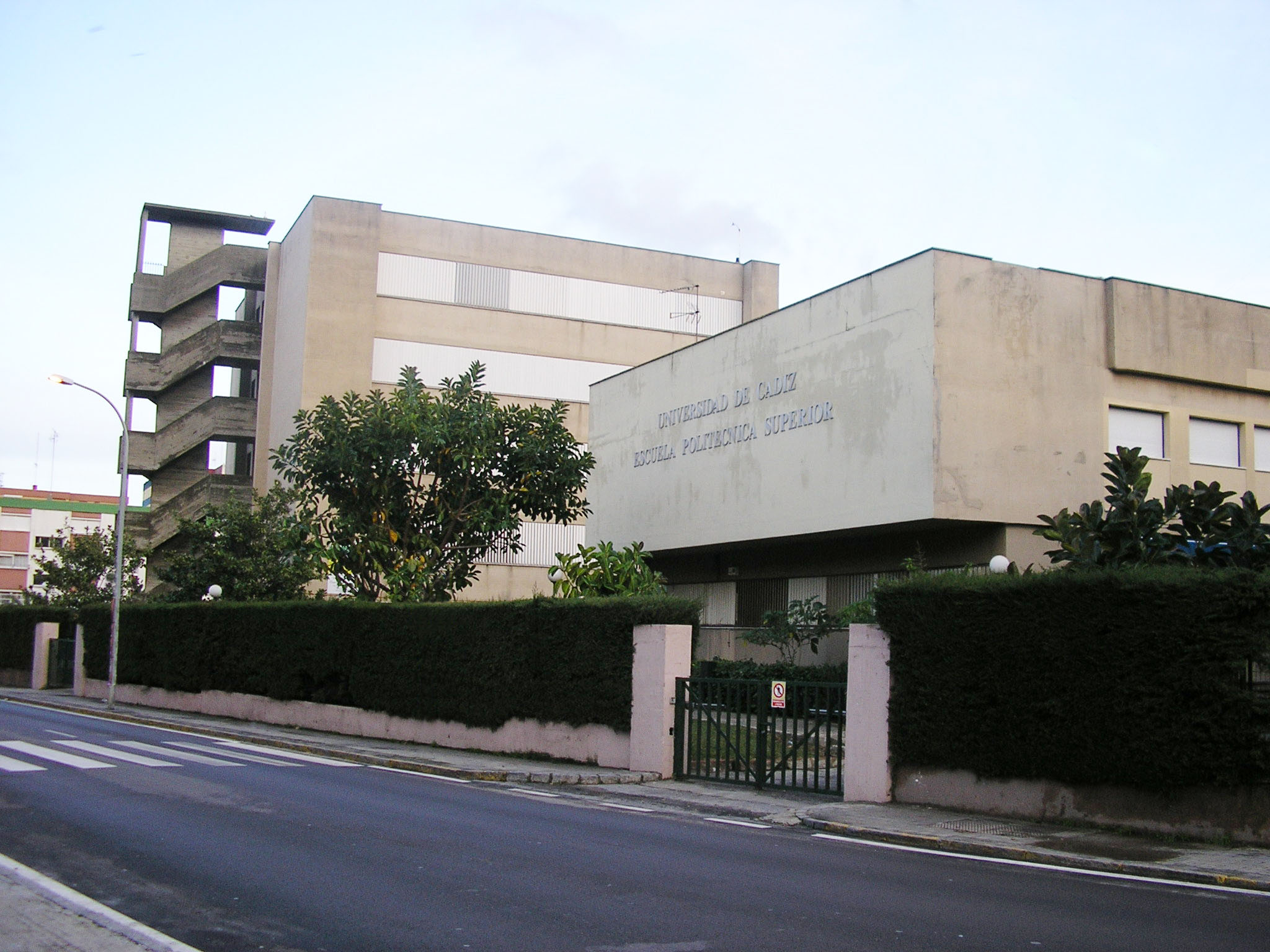
Algeciras Campus

== Schools within the university ==
Some schools within the university are:

- University School of Modern Languages ("")
- University School of Health ("Salus Infirmorum") at Cádiz
- University School of Engineering at Puerto Real
- University School of Labor Relations at Jerez de la Frontera
- University School of Legal and Economic Studies ("Tomás y Valiente") at Algeciras
- University Center for Advanced Studies at Algeciras
- University School of Labor Relations at Algeciras
- University School of Pedagogy ("Virgen de Europa") at La Línea de la Concepción

== University rectors ==
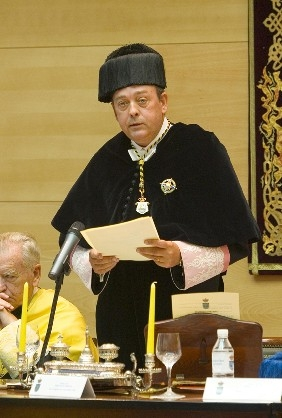
Diego Sales Márquez, rector from 2003 to 2011

University rectors in UCA history:

- October, 1979 – February, 1984: Felipe Garrido
- February, 1984 – June, 1986: Mariano Peñalver Simó
- September, 1986 – January, 1995: José Luis Romero Palanco. Reelected in November, 1990.
- January, 1995 – April, 2003: Guillermo Martínez Massanet. Reelected in February, 1999.
- May, 2003 – July, 2011: Diego Sales Márquez. Reelected in May, 2007.
- July, 2011 – 2019: Eduardo González Mazo.
- July, 2019 – present : Francisco Piniella Corbachoю

== Free software and supercomputing ==
One of the first free software offices in Spain was founded at this university, Libre Software and Open Knowledge Office (OSLUCA). This office has set up some free software conferences (2004: I, 2005: II, 2006: III y 2009: IV), and the FLOSS International Conference.

UCA provides a supercomputer for research purposes since 2007. It is a cluster of 80 computers, each with 4 processing cores (finally 320 cores) and 640 GB RAM, designed for a peak performance of 3.8 TFLOPS. The supercomputer uses SUSE Linux Enterprise Server 10 as operating system.

== Notable alumni ==
Some notable alumni from UCA:

- Francisco de Paula Medina Gutiérrez: physician and lecturer
- Pascual Hontañón Cabezas: physician
- Federico Rubio y Gali: surgeon
- Benito Alcina y Rancés: hygienist
- Antonio Machado y Núñez: rector of University of Sevilla and mayor of Sevilla
- Cayetano del Toro y Quartiellers: politician
- Gabriel Matute y Valls
- Guillermina Rojas y Orgis

== Honoris Causa ==
Honorary doctoral degrees from University of Cádiz:

- William W.L. Glenn (1981)
- Dietrich E. Wilhelm Trincker (1982)
- Andrés Segovia Torres (1982)
- Rafael Alberti Merello (1985)
- Antonio Domínguez Ortiz (1985)
- Adolfo Sánchez Vázquez (1987)
- José Ignacio Barraquer Moner (1987)
- Fernando Quiñones Chozas (1998)
- Manuel Clavero Arévalo (2000)
- Andrés Fernández Díaz (2004)
- José Manuel Caballero Bonald (2004)
- Miguel Ángel Ladero Quesada (2004)
- Margarita Salas Falgueras (2004)
- Carlos Castilla del Pino (2004)
- Salustiano del Campo (2006)
- Paco de Lucía (2007)
- Juan de Dios Ramírez Heredia (2008)
- Takashi Asano (2008)
- Marcelino Camacho Abad (2008)
- Nicolás Redondo (2008)
- Gil Carlos Rodríguez Iglesias
- Clara Eugenia Lida

== Partnerships ==
The university participates in the ERASMUS programme, a partnership for student exchanges in Europe. It maintains relations with many universities on all continents.

== Partnership Universities ==
Universities that have an exchange programme with the University of Cádiz include:

Germany

- Carl von Ossietzky University of Oldenburg
- University of Würzburg

== See also ==
- List of universities in Spain
