= Jaime Siles =

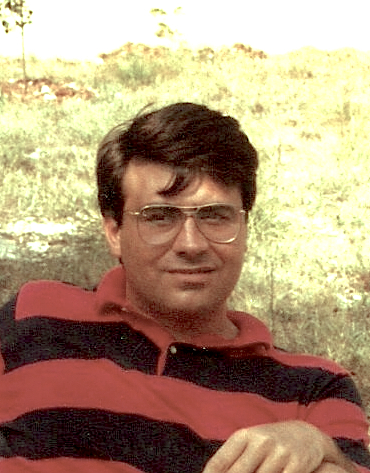
Jaime Siles

Jaime Siles is a Spanish poet, translator and literary critic. He was born in Valencia in 1951, and studied Philosophy and Literature at Salamanca University. He continued his studies at Tubingen University, aided by a scholarship from the Fundación Juan March. He taught at the University of La Laguna, before moving to Vienna in 1983 where he became the director of the Spanish Cultural Institute.

Siles published his first book of poems, Génesis de la luz, at the age of 18. He has since published more than a dozen poetry collections and won many prizes for his work. He has also written widely in the field of literary criticism. As a translator, he has rendered the works of William Wordsworth, Paul Celan, Arno Schmidt, Hans Jauss and Martin Walser into English.
