= List of film periodicals =

Film periodicals combine discussion of individual films, genres and directors with in-depth considerations of the medium and the conditions of its production and reception. Their articles contrast with film reviewing in newspapers and magazines which principally serve as a consumer guide to movies.

== Magazines and trade publications ==
Title	ISSN	Publisher	Language	Country	Frequency	Publication range	Status	Document type
1895	ISSN 0769-0959	Association Française de Recherche sur l'Histoire du Cinéma (AFRHC)	French	France	3 times per year	1986–	Current	Magazine
24 images	ISSN 0707-9389	24/30 I/S - Revue 24 images	French	Canada	Bi-monthly	1979–	Current	Magazine
Academia	ISSN 1133-7559	Academia de las Artes y las Ciencias Cinematograficas de España	Spanish	Spain	Irregular	1993–2005	Ceased	Magazine
Action	ISSN 0001-7361	Directors Guild of America (DGA)	English	United States	Bi-monthly	1966–1978	Ceased	Trade journal
Afterimage	ISSN 0261-4472	Afterimage Publishing	English	United Kingdom	Irregular	1970–1987	Ceased	Magazine
Alphaville: Journal of Film and Screen Media	ISSN 2009-4078	Film and Screen Media, University College Cork, Ireland	English	Ireland	Semi-annually	2011–	Current	Journal
El Amante Cine	ISSN 0329-2606	Ediciones Tatanka SA	Spanish	Argentina	Monthly	1991–2018	Ceased	Magazine, digital-only from 2012
American Cinematographer	ISSN 0002-7928	American Society of Cinematographers	English	United States	Monthly	1920–	Current	Magazine
American Film	ISSN 0361-4751	American Film Institute (AFI) / BPI Communications	English	United States	Monthly	1975–1992	Ceased	Magazine
Andere Sinema	ISSN 0773-5855	De Andere Film.	Dutch	Belgium	Bi-monthly	1978–2000	Ceased	Magazine
Andy Warhol's Interview	ISSN 0020-5109	Inter View, Inc.	English	United States	Monthly	1972–1977	Ceased	Magazine
Animation Planet	ISSN 1536-8882	Inkwell Productions	English	United States	Quarterly	1997–1998	Ceased	Magazine
Animato!	ISSN 1042-539X		English	United States	Quarterly	1983–2000	Ceased	Magazine
Anthologie du Cinéma	ISSN 0570-2917	Avant-Scène	French	France	Bi-monthly	1965–1982	Ceased	Monographic series
APEC - Revue Belge du Cinéma	ISSN 0774-8728	Association des Professeurs pour (la promotion de) l'Éducation Cinématographique (APEC)	French	Belgium	Irregular	1963–1976	Ceased	Magazine
Archives	ISSN 0985-2395	Institut Jean Vigo	French	France	Irregular	1986–	Current	Magazine
Art du Cinéma, L'	ISSN 1262-0424	Cinéma Art Nouveau	French	France	Irregular	1993–	Current	Magazine
Avant-Scène Cinéma	ISSN 0045-1150	Avant-Scène	French	France	Monthly	1961–2009	Current	Magazine
Bianco e Nero	ISSN 0394-008X	Fondazione Centro Sperimentale di Cinematografia	Italian	Italy	3 times per year	1937–	Current	Magazine
The Big Reel	ISSN 0744-723X	F+W Publications	English	United States	Bi-monthly	1974–2008	Ceased	Magazine
Billboard	ISSN 0006-2510	Billboard-Hollywood Reporter Media Group	English	United States	Weekly	1894–	Current	Magazine
The Bioscope	OCLC 1001359739	London	English	United Kingdom	Weekly	1908–1932	Ceased	Trade journal
BoxOffice	ISSN 0006-8527	BoxOffice Media	English	United States	Weekly	1920–	Current	Magazine
Bref: le magazine du court métrage	ISSN 0759-6898	Agence du court métrage	French	France	Bi-monthly	1989–2016	Ceased	Magazine
British Cinematographer	ISSN 1477-1020		English	United Kingdom	Monthly	2010-	Current	Magazine
Bright Lights Film Journal	ISSN 0147-4049	Bright Lights	English	United States	Irregular	1974–	Current	Magazine
Bulgarian Films	ISSN 0204-8884	Bulgarian Cinematography State Corp.	English	Bulgaria	8 times per year	1960–1990	Ceased	Magazine
Ça	ISSN 0246-0076	Editions Albatros	French	France	Irregular	1973–1980	Ceased	Magazine
Cahiers de la Cinémathèque	ISSN 0764-8499	Institut Jean Vigo	French	France	Annually	1971–2007	Ceased	Magazine
Cahiers du Cinéma	ISSN 0008-011X	Cahiers du Cinéma	French	France	Monthly	1951–	Current	Magazine
Caimán Cuadernos de Cine	ISSN 2253-7317	Caimán Ediciones	Spanish	Spain	Monthly	2012—	Current	Magazine
Canadian Film Weekly	ISSN 0590-7918	Film Publications of Canada	English	Canada	Weekly	1936–1970	Ceased	Magazine
Canadian Moving Pictures Digest			English	Canada	Weekly	1915–1957	Ceased	Magazine
Cantrills Filmnotes	ISSN 0158-4154	Arthur & Corinne Cantrill Eds. & Pubs.	English	Australia	Irregular	1971–2000	Ceased	Magazine
Casablanca	ISSN 0211-8807	Prensa Cinematográfica, S.A.	Spanish	Spain	Monthly	1981–1985	Ceased	Magazine
Castoro Cinema, Il	ISSN 0392-4440	Il Castoro	Italian	Italy	Bi-monthly	1974–	Current	Magazine
Celuloide	ISSN 0008-8781	Celuloide	Portuguese	Portugal	Monthly	1957–1986	Ceased	Magazine
Chaplin	ISSN 0045-6349	Svenska filminstitutet	Swedish	Sweden	Bi-monthly	1959–1997	Ceased	Magazine
Cine		Cineteca Nacional (México)	Spanish	Mexico	Monthly	1978–1980	Ceased	Magazine
Cine al Dia	ISSN 0009-692X	Sociedad Civil Cine al Día	Spanish	Venezuela	Irregular	1967–1983	Ceased	Magazine
Ciné-Bulles	ISSN 0820-8921	Association des Cinémas Parallèles du Québec	French	Canada	Quarterly	1982–	Current	Magazine
Cine Cubano	ISSN 0009-6946	Instituto Cubano del Arte e Industria Cinematograficos	Spanish	Cuba	Irregular	1960–	Current	Magazine
Ciné-Tracts	ISSN 0704-061X	Institute of Cinema Studies	French	Canada	Quarterly	1977–1982	Ceased	Magazine
Cineaste	ISSN 0009-7004	Cineaste Publishers, Inc.	English	United States	Quarterly	1967–	Current	Magazine
Cinefantastique	ISSN 0145-6032	Frederick S. Clarke	English	United States	Quarterly	1967–2006	Ceased	Magazine
Cinefex	ISSN 0198-1056	Cinefex	English	United States	Quarterly	1980–2021	Ceased	Magazine
Cineforum	ISSN 0009-7039	Federazione Italiana Cineforum	Italian	Italy	Monthly	1961–	Current	Magazine
CineJap	ISSN 0249-471X	CineJap	French	France	Irregular	1977–1979	Ceased	Magazine
Cinema	ISSN 0009-7047	Spectator International Inc.	English	United States	Irregular	1962–1976	Ceased	Magazine
Cinema	ISSN 0578-2910	Consiliul Culturii si Educatiei Socialiste	Romanian	Romania	Monthly	1963–1989	Ceased	Magazine
Cinema		Independent	English	United Kingdom	Irregular	1968–1970	Ceased	Magazine
Cinema	ISSN 0720-020X	TV SPIELFILM Verlag GmbH.	German	Germany	Monthly	1975–	Current	Magazine
The Cinema			English	United Kingdom	Monthly	1912–1958	Ceased	Magazine
Cinema 2002	ISSN 0210-0304	Miguel J. Goñi	Spanish	Spain	Monthly	1975–1980	Ceased	Magazine
Cinéma 72	ISSN 0045-6926	Fédération française des ciné-clubs	French	France	Monthly	1954–1999	Ceased	Magazine
Cinema Canada	ISSN 0009-7071	Cinema Canada Magazine Foundation	English	Canada	Monthly	1967–1989?	Ceased	Magazine
Cinéma d'Aujourd'hui	ISSN 0578-2953	Cinéma d'Aujourd'hui Films Ed.	French	France	Irregular	1975–1980	Ceased	Magazine
Cinema in India	ISSN 0970-3276	National Film Development Corporation Limited	English	India	Quarterly	1987–?	Ceased	Magazine
Cinema Novo			Portuguese	Portugal	Bi-monthly	1978–?	Ceased	Magazine
Cinema Nuovo	ISSN 0009-711X	Edizioni Dedalo	Italian	Italy	Bi-monthly	1952–1996	Ceased	Magazine
Cinema Papers	ISSN 0311-3639	Niche Media Pty Ltd	English	Australia	Bi-monthly	1974–2001	Ceased	Magazine
Cinéma Québec	ISSN 0319-4647	Jean-Pierre Tadros	French	Canada	Monthly	1971–1978	Ceased	Magazine
Cinema Retro	ISSN 1751-4606	Solo Publishing	English	United Kingdom	Monthly	2005–	Current	Magazine
Cinema Scope	ISSN 1488-7002	Cinema Scope Publishing	English	Canada	Quarterly	1999–2024	Ceased	Magazine
Cinema World (电影世界)	ISSN 1006-6756	Changchun Film Group Periodical Publishing (长影集团期刊出版公司)	Simplified Chinese	China	Monthly	1958–	Current	Magazine
CinémAction	ISSN 0243-4504	Corlet Publications	French	France	Quarterly	1978–	Current	Magazine
Cinémas d'Amérique Latine	ISSN 1267-4397	Association Rencontres Cinémas d'Amérique Latine de Toulouse (ARCALT)	French	France	Annually	1992–	Current	Magazine
Cinemascope.it, independent film journal		Cinemascope.it	English	Italy	Semi-annually	2004–	Current	Magazine
Cinemateca - Cuadernos de Cine Colombiano		Cinemateca Distrital	Spanish	Colombia	Quarterly	1977–?	Ceased	Magazine
Cinemateca Revista	ISSN 0797-2059	Cinemateca Uruguaya	Spanish	Uruguay	Irregular	1977–1995	Ceased	Magazine
Cinematic Codes Review	ISSN 2473-3385	Anaphora Literary Press	English	United States	Tri-Annual	2016–	Current	Magazine
Cinématographe	ISSN 1147-1948	Editions du Reel	French	France	Monthly	1973–1987	Ceased	Magazine
Cinemaya	ISSN 0970-8782	Aruna Vasudev	English	India	Quarterly	1988–2005	Ceased	Magazine
Cineplex Magazine		Cineplex Entertainment	English	Canada	Monthly	1999–	Current	Magazine
Cinepur	ISSN 1213-516X	Cinepur Friends Association	Czech	Czech Republic	Bi-monthly	1991–	Current	Magazine
CineSource		Doniphan Blair/A Media	English	United States	Monthly	2008–	Current	Magazine
Cinéthique	ISSN 1255-3239	Editions Cinéthique	French	France	Irregular	1969–1985	Ceased	Magazine
Cineuropa		Creative Europe Media	English, French, Spanish, Italian	Belgium	Daily	2002–	Current	Magazine
City Entertainment zh:電影雙周刊	ISSN 1026-8936	Film Biweekly Publishing House (電影雙周刊出版社有限公司)	Traditional Chinese	Hong Kong	Bi-weekly	1979–2007	Ceased	Magazine
Classic Images	ISSN 0275-8423	Muscatine Journal	English	United States	Monthly	1979–2025	Ceased	Magazine
Contracampo	ISSN 0210-3443	Francesc Lliñas	Spanish	Spain	Irregular	1979–1987	Ceased	Magazine
Copie Zéro	ISSN 0709-0471	Cinémathèque québécoise	French	Canada	Quarterly	1979–1988	Ceased	Magazine
Creative Screenwriting	ISSN 1084-8665	Inside Information Group	English	United States	Quarterly	1994–	Current	Magazine
Critic	ISSN 0090-9831	American Federation of Film Societies	English	United States	Bi-monthly	1972–1972?	Ceased	Magazine
The Cue Sheet	ISSN 0888-9015	The Film Music Society	English	United States	Quarterly	1984–	Current	Magazine
Czechoslovak Film	ISSN 0011-4588	Czechoslovak Filmexport, Press Department	Czech	Czechoslovakia	Quarterly	1948–1989	Ceased	Magazine
Daily Cinema			English	United Kingdom	Daily	1958–1968	Ceased	Newspaper
Daily Film Renter			English	United Kingdom	Daily	1927–1958	Ceased	Newspaper
Daily Variety		Penske Media Corporation	English	United States	Daily	1933–2013	Ceased	Newspaper
Décadrages			French	Switzerland	Bi-yearly	2004–	Ceased	Trade journal
DGA	ISSN 1083-5253	Directors Guild of America (DGA)	English	United States	Bi-monthly	1991–2004	Ceased	Trade journal
Dialogue on Film		American Film Institute (AFI)	English	United States	Monthly	1972–1975	Ceased	Magazine
Dirigido por...	ISSN 0212-7245	Dirigido por... S.L.	Spanish	Spain	Monthly	1972–	Current	Magazine
East European Film Bulletin	ISSN 1775-3635	East European Film Bulletin	English	France	Monthly	2011–	Current	Online journal
Eclipses	ISSN 1279-6395	Eclipses	French	France	Irregular	1993–	Current	Magazine
Ecran	ISSN 0243-4490	Editions de l'Atalante	French	France	Monthly	1972–1979	Ceased	Magazine
Écran Fantastique	ISSN 0769-1920	Cyber Press Publishing	French	France	Monthly	1969–	Current	Magazine
Ekran	ISSN 0013-3302	Slovenska Kinoteka	Slovenian	Slovenia	Bi-monthly	1962–	Current	Magazine
Electric Sheep	ISSN 1755-649X	Wallflower Press	English	United Kingdom	Quarterly	2007–2009	Ceased	Magazine
Empire	ISSN 0957-4948	Bauer Consumer Media	English	United Kingdom	Monthly	1989–	Current	Magazine
Enthusiasm	ISSN 0308-0404	Artificial Eye	English	United Kingdom	Irregular	1975–2003	Ceased	Magazine
EPD Film	ISSN 0176-2044	Gemeinschaftswerk der Evangelischen Publizistik e.V.	German	Germany	Monthly	1984–	Current	Magazine
Études Cinématographiques	ISSN 0014-1992	Lettres modernes / Minard	French	France	Irregular	1960–	Current	Monographic series
Exhibitors Herald		Quigley Publishing Company	English	United States	Weekly	1915–1927	Ceased	Trade paper
Exhibitors Herald and Moving Pictures World		Quigley Publishing Company	English	United States	Weekly	1928	Ceased	Trade paper
Exhibitors Herald World		Quigley Publishing Company	English	United States	Weekly	1929–1930	Ceased	Trade paper
Eyeball		Stephen Thrower	English	United Kingdom	Irregular	1989–1998	Ceased	Magazine
Exhibitors' Times		Wm. A. Johnston	English	United States	Weekly	1913	Ceased	Magazine
Fade In	ISSN 1533-3779	Fade In Magazine	English	United States	Quarterly	1995–	Current	Magazine
Fant	ISSN 0014-7494	Fant	Norwegian	Norway	Irregular	1965–1974	Ceased	Magazine
FIAF Bulletin	ISSN 1017-1126	Fédération internationale des archives du film (FIAF)	English	Belgium	Semi-annually	1972–1993	Ceased	Magazine
Film	ISSN 1424-1889	Stiftung CinéCommunication	German	Switzerland	Monthly	1999–2001	Ceased	Magazine
Film	ISSN 1720-8467	Centro Studi Cinematografici	Italian	Italy	Bi-monthly	1984–	Current	Magazine
Film & Kino	ISSN 0015-1351	Film & Kino	Norwegian	Norway	Monthly	1965–	Current	Magazine
Film a Doba	ISSN 0015-1068	Film a Doba	Czech	Czech Republic	Quarterly	1955–	Current	Magazine
Film Bulletin		Mo Wax	English	United States	Daily		Ceased	Magazine
Film Comment	ISSN 0015-119X	Film Society of Lincoln Center	English	United States	Bi-monthly	1962–	Current	Magazine
The Film Daily		Jack Alicoate	English	United States	Bi-weekly	1915–1970	Ceased	Magazine
Filmdienst	ISSN 0720-0781	Katholisches Institut für Medieninformation	German	Germany	Bi-weekly	1947–	Current	Magazine
Film Directions	ISSN 0141-3538	Arts Council of Northern Ireland	English	United Kingdom	Quarterly	1977–1988?	Ceased	Magazine
Film Dope	ISSN 0305-1706	Film Dope	English	United Kingdom	Irregular	1972–1994	Ceased	Magazine
Film en Televisie	ISSN 1373-1459	Katholieke Filmliga (KFL)	Dutch	Belgium	Monthly	1956–2005	Ceased	Magazine
Film Form	ISSN 0950-1851	North-East (Overseas) Trading Co. Ltd.	English	United Kingdom	Irregular	1976–1977?	Ceased	Magazine
Film Heritage	ISSN 0015-1270	University of Dayton	English	United States	Quarterly	1965–1977	Ceased	Magazine
The Film Index		The Films Publishing Co.	English	United States	Weekly	1909–?	Ceased	Trade paper
Film International	ISSN 1651-6826	Intellect	English	United Kingdom	Bi-monthly	2003–	Current	Magazine
Film Ireland	ISSN 0791-7546	Filmbase, Centre for Film and Video	English	Republic of Ireland (Eire)	Bi-monthly	1992–2013	Ceased	Magazine
Film Journal	ISSN 0046-3787	The Film Journal	English	United States	Irregular	1971–1975	Ceased	Magazine
Film Library Quarterly	ISSN 0015-1327	Film Library Information Council	English	United States	Quarterly	1968–1984	Ceased	Magazine
Film Reader	ISSN 0361-722X	Northwestern University, Film Division	English	United States	Irregular	1975–1982?	Ceased	Magazine
Film.sk	ISSN 1335-8286	Slovak Film Institute	Slovak	Slovakia	Monthly	1999–	Current	Magazine
Film Review	ISSN 0001-0413	Various	English	United Kingdom	Annually	1944–2015	Ceased	Monographic series
Film Review	ISSN 0001-0413	Various	English	United Kingdom	Monthly	1950–2008	Ceased	Magazine
Film Society Review	ISSN 0015-1408	American Federation of Film Societies	English	United States	Monthly	1965–1972	Ceased	Magazine
Film West	ISSN 0791-3753	Galway Film Centre	English	Republic of Ireland (Eire)	Quarterly	1989–2001	Ceased	Magazine
Filmavisa	ISSN 0332-5350	Norsk Filmsenter	Norwegian	Norway	Quarterly	1977–1981	Ceased	Magazine
Filmbulletin	ISSN 0257-7852	Filmbulletin	German	Switzerland	Irregular	1958–	Current	Magazine
Filmcritica	ISSN 0015-1513	Thesan & Turan	Italian	Italy	Monthly	1950–	Current	Magazine
Filme Cultura	ISSN 0101-207X	Empresa Brasileira de Filmes	Portuguese	Brazil	Irregular	1966–1987?	Ceased	Magazine
Filméchange	ISSN 0181-4141	Editions des Quatre Vents	French	France	Irregular	1977–1990	Ceased	Magazine
F.I.L.M.E. Magazine		Film & Kino	Spanish	Mexico	Irregular	2011–	Current	Online magazine
Filmfacts	ISSN 0015-153X	American Film Institute	English	United States	Bi-weekly	1958–1977	Ceased	Magazine
Filmfan	ISSN 3069-8766	Filmfan	English	United States	Monthly	2026-2027	Ceased	Magazine
Filmfaust	ISSN 0176-1110	Filmfaust Verlag	German	Germany	Irregular	1976–1996	Ceased	Magazine
Filmfax	ISSN 0895-0393	Filmfax	English	United States	Bi-monthly	1986–2024	Ceased	Magazine
Filmgeschichte	ISSN 1431-3502	Deutsche Kinemathek	German	Germany	Irregular	1996–2005	Ceased	Magazine
Filmhäftet	ISSN 0345-3057	Filmhäftet	Swedish	Sweden	Bi-monthly	1973–2002	Ceased	Magazine
Filmihullu	ISSN 0782-3797	Filmihullu ry	Finnish	Finland	Bi-monthly	1968–	Current	Magazine
Filmkrant	ISSN 0169-8109	Filmkrant, de	Dutch	The Netherlands	Monthly	1981–	Current	Magazine
Filmkritik	ISSN 0015-1572	Filmkritiker Kooperative	German	German Federal Republic	Monthly	1957–1984	Ceased	Magazine
Filmkultura	ISSN 0015-1580	Magyar Filmintézet igazgátoja	Hungarian	Hungary	Monthly	1960–1995	Ceased	Magazine
Filmmagie	ISSN 1782-6756	Filmmagie vzw	Dutch	Belgium	Monthly	2006–2020	Ceased	Magazine
Filmmakers Monthly newsletter	ISSN 0194-4339	Suncraft International	English	United States	Monthly	1968–1982	Ceased	Magazine
Filmnews	ISSN 1036-8701	Sydney Filmmakers Co-operative / Australian Film Commission	English	Australia	Monthly	1971–1995	Ceased	Magazine
Filmograph	ISSN 0015-1629	Murray Summers, Ed. & Pub.	English	United States	Quarterly	1970–1976	Ceased	Magazine
Filmoteca		Universidad Nacional Autonoma de Mexico (UNAM)	Spanish	Mexico	Unknown	1979–?	Ceased	Magazine
Filmowy Serwis Prasowy	ISSN 0430-4519	Agencja Dystrybycji Filmowej	Polish	Poland	Bi-monthly	1955–1996	Ceased	Magazine
The Film Pupil	ISSN 3049-8384	Pupilla Publishing	English	United Kingdom	Bi-monthly	2021–	Current	Magazine
Filmrutan	ISSN 0015-1661	Sveriges Förenade Filmstudios (SFF)	Swedish	Sweden	Quarterly	1958–	Current	Magazine
Films	ISSN 0261-8001	Ocean Publications	English	United Kingdom	Monthly	1980–1985	Ceased	Magazine
Films and Filming	ISSN 0015-167X	Brevet Publishing Limited	English	United Kingdom	Monthly	1954–1990	Ceased	Magazine
Films in Review	ISSN 0015-1688	National Board of Review of Motion Pictures	English	United States	Monthly	1950–1997	Ceased	Magazine
Films of the Golden Age	ISSN 1083-5369	Muscatine Journal	English	United States	Quarterly	1995–2025	Ceased	Magazine
Focus on Film	ISSN 0015-5128	Tantivy Press	English	United Kingdom	Quarterly	1970–1981	Ceased	Magazine
Fotogramas		Hearst Communications	Spanish	Spain	Monthly	1946–	Current	Magazine
Found Footage Magazine	ISSN 2462-2885	FFM	English	Spain	Semi-annually	2014–	Current	Film studies journal
Glamour Girls of the Silver Screen's Quarterly Newsletter		Glamour Girls of the Silver Screen	English	Austria	Quarterly	2004–	Current	Online magazine
Guia de Filmes	ISSN 1678-3689	Empresa Brasileira de Filmes	Portuguese	Brazil	Irregular	1967–1987	Ceased	Magazine
Hablemos de Cine	ISSN 0046-6700	Hablemos de Cine	Spanish	Peru	Irregular	1965–1984	Ceased	Magazine
Harrison's Hollywood Reviews		P. S. Harrison	English	United States	Weekly	196?–1962	Ceased	Magazine
Harrison's Reports		P. S. Harrison	English	United States	Weekly	1919–1962	Ceased	Magazine
The Hollywood Reporter	ISSN 0018-3660	Billboard-Hollywood Reporter Media Group	English	United States	Daily/Weekly	1930–	Current	Newspaper/magazine
Hrvatski filmski ljetopis	ISSN 1330-7665	Croatian Film Association	Croatian	Croatia	Quarterly	1995–	Current	Magazine
Hungarian Cinema	ISSN 0865-9214	Hungarofilm	English	Hungary	Unknown	1989–1990	Ceased	Magazine
Hungarofilm Bulletin	ISSN 0018-7798	Hungarofilm	English	Hungary	Bi-monthly	1967–1988	Ceased	Magazine
Illusions	ISSN 0112-9341	Imaginary Partnership	English	New Zealand	Irregular	1986–	Current	Magazine
Iluminace	ISSN 0862-397X	Národní Filmový Archiv	Czech	Czech Republic	Quarterly	1989–	Current	Magazine
Iluzjon	ISSN 0209-3537	Filmoteka Narodowa	Polish	Poland	Quarterly	1981–1995	Ceased	Magazine
Image et Son	ISSN 0536-5481	Ligue Française de l'Enseignement et de l'Education Permanente	French	France	Monthly	1951–1982	Ceased	Magazine
Imagines			Spanish	Mexico	Monthly	1979–?	Ceased	Magazine
Information [Berlin]	ISSN 0138-3698	Hochschule für Film und Fernsehen der DDR	German	German Democratic Republic	Monthly	1971–1977	Ceased	Magazine
Information [Wiesbaden]		Deutsches Institut für Filmkunde	German	German Federal Republic	Monthly	1973–1983	Ceased	Magazine
International Documentary	ISSN 1077-9361	International Documentary Association	English	United States	Monthly	1982–2005	Ceased	Magazine
Iskusstvo Kino	ISSN 0130-6405	Soyuz Kinematografistov Rossii	Russian	Russia	Monthly	1931–	Current	Magazine
Jeune Cinéma	ISSN 0758-4202	Association des Amis de Jeune Cinema	French	France	Irregular	1964–	Current	Magazine
Journal of Film Preservation	ISSN 1609-2694	Fédération Internationale des Archives du Film (FIAF)	English	Belgium	Semi-annually	1993–	Current	Magazine
Journal of the Producers Guild of America	ISSN 0032-9703	Producers Guild of America	English	United States	Quarterly	1967–1977	Ceased	Magazine
Der Kinematograph	ZDB-ID 575137-8	Eduard Lintz / Scherl-Verlag	German	Germany	Weekly / Daily	1907–1935	Ceased	Magazine
Kino	ISSN 0861-4393	Sajuza na Balgarskite Filmovi Dejci i Ministerstvoto na Kulturata (Union of Bulgarian filmmakers)	Bulgarian	Bulgaria	Bi-monthly	1991–	Current	Magazine
Kino	ISSN 0023-1673	Fundacja Kino	Polish	Poland	Monthly	1966–	Current	Magazine
Kino-Teatr	ISSN 1562-3238	National University of "Kyiv-Mohyla Academy"	Ukrainian	Ukraine	Bi-Monthly	1995–	Current	Magazine
Kinoizkustvo	ISSN 0323-9993	Komitet za Izkustvo i Kultura	Bulgarian	Bulgaria	Monthly	1946–1990	Ceased	Magazine
Lähikuva	ISSN 0782-3053	Lähikuva	Finnish	Finland	Quarterly	1980–	Current	Magazine
Little White Lies	ISSN 1745-9168	The Church of London	English	United Kingdom	Bi-Monthly	2005–	Current	Magazine
Lumiere		Incorporated Newsagencies Company	English	Australia	Monthly	1970–1974	Ceased	Magazine
Lumière du Cinéma	ISSN 0150-2905	Lumière du Cinéma	French	France	Monthly	1977–1981	Ceased	Magazine
Maarvon (Western)		Maayan Poetry Association	Hebrew	Israel	Annually	2005–	Current	Magazine
The MacGuffin	ISSN 1035-9001	Alfred Hitchcock Special Interest Group	English	Australia	Irregular	1990–2022	Ceased	Magazine
Magazines of the Movies		Magazines of the Movies	English	United Kingdom	Annually	1990–1995	Ceased	Magazine
Media	ISSN 1023-4349	Commission des Communautés européennes	French	Belgium	Bi-monthly	1991–1999	Ceased	Magazine
Media Play News		JCH Media Inc.	English	United States	Monthly	2018–	Current	Magazine
Mensuel du Cinéma	ISSN 1242-0492	Mensuel du Cinéma	French	France	Monthly	1992–1994	Ceased	Magazine
Meteor		PVS	German	Austria	Quarterly	1995–1999	Ceased	Magazine
Metro	ISSN 0312-2654	Australian Teachers of Media (ATOM)	English	Australia	Quarterly	1974–	Current	Magazine
Millimeter	ISSN 0164-9655	Prism Business Media	English	United States	Monthly	1973–	Current	Trade journal
Modern Review	ISSN 0964-2323		English	United Kingdom	Bi-monthly	1991–1995	Ceased	Magazine
Monogram		Monogram Publications	English	United Kingdom	Irregular	1971–1975	Ceased	Magazine
Monthly Film Bulletin	ISSN 0027-0407	British Film Institute (BFI)	English	United Kingdom	Monthly	1934–1991	Ceased	Magazine
Motion Picture Herald		Quigley Publishing Company	English	United States	Weekly	1931–1972	Ceased	Trade paper
Motion Picture News		Exhibitors' Times Inc.	English	United States	Weekly	1913–1930	Ceased	Trade paper
Motography		Electricity Magazine Corporation/Quigley Publishing Company	English	United States	Monthly	1911–1918	Ceased	Trade paper
Movie	ISSN 0027-268X	Movie	English	United Kingdom	Irregular	1962–1990?	Ceased	Magazine
Movie Advertising Collector	ISSN 1081-2555	George Reed, Ed. & Pub.	English	United States	Bi-monthly	1990–1997	Ceased	Monographic series
Moviemag.it		Movie Magazine	Italian	Italy	Bi-weekly	2019–	Current	Magazine
MovieMaker		Disticor Magazine Distribution Services	English	United States	Quarterly	1993–	Current	Magazine
Movietone News	ISSN 0885-5021	Seattle Film Society	English	United States	Irregular	1971–1981	Ceased	Magazine
Moving Picture News		Cinematograph Publishing Co.	English	United States	Weekly	1908–1913	Ceased	Trade paper
The Moving Picture World		Chalmers Publishing Company	English	United States	Weekly	1907–1927	Ceased	Trade journal
MyM	ISSN 2049-8187	MCM Central	English	United Kingdom	Monthly	2012–	Current	Magazine
New Canadian Film	ISSN 0548-4162	Cinémathèque québécoise	English	Canada	Irregular	1968–1978	Ceased	Magazine
The Nickelodeon		Electricity Magazine Corporation	English	United States	Monthly	1909–1911	Ceased	Trade paper
Nickel Odeon	ISSN 1135-7681	Nickel Odeon Dos S.A.	Spanish	Spain	Quarterly	1995–2003	Ceased	Magazine
Nosferatu	ISSN 1131-9372	Donostia Kultura	Spanish	Spain	3 times per year	1989–2007	Ceased	Magazine
Nouvelles Vues		Québec Cinema	French	Canada	2 times per year	2003–	Current	Journal
Objetivo			Spanish	Spain		1953–1956	Ceased	Magazine
On Film	ISSN 0161-1585	Film Society of the University of California	English	United States	Quarterly	1970–1985	Ceased	Magazine
Onfilm	ISSN 0112-2789	Onfilm Magazine Ltd.	English	New Zealand	Monthly	1983–	Current	Trade journal
Osian's Cinemaya	ISSN 0973-2144	Osian's - Connoisseurs of Art Pvt. Ltd.	English	India	Quarterly	2006–2007	Ceased	Magazine
Outré	ISSN 0895-0393	Filmfax	English	United States	Quarterly	1995–2003	Ceased	Magazine
Padidar (Persian: مجلۀ پدیدار)		Tehran University of Art	Persian	Iran	Irregular	2017–	Current	Digital magazine
Panoráma	ISSN 0139-9950	Ceskoslovenský filmový ústav	Czech	Czechoslovakia	Quarterly	1974?–1981	Ceased	Magazine
Photoplay	ISSN 0732-538X	Macfadden Publications	English	United States	Monthly	1911–1980	Ceased	Magazine
Polish Film	ISSN 0015-136X	Film Polski	English	Poland	Quarterly	1969–1992	Ceased	Magazine
Popular Movies (大众电影)	ISSN 0492-0929	Popular Movies Publishing (大众电影杂志社)	Simplified Chinese	China	Monthly	1950–	Current	Magazine
Positif	ISSN 0048-4911	Editions SCOPE	French	France	Monthly	1952–	Current	Magazine
POV - A Danish Journal of Film Studies	ISSN 1396-1160	Aarhus Universitet, Institut for Informations- og Medievidenskab	English	Denmark	Semi-annually	1996–2009	Ceased	Magazine
Ray	ISSN 1993-811X	Substance Media Ltd.	German	Austria	Monthly	2001–	Current	Magazine
Recherche Film und Fernsehen	ISSN 1864-5046	Deutsche Kinemathek	German	Germany	Semi-annually	2007–2010	Ceased	Magazine
Refractory: a Journal of Entertainment Media	ISSN 1447-4905	The University of Melbourne	English	Australia	Bi-annually	2001–2021	Ceased	Magazine
Restaurations de la Cinémathèque Française		Cinémathèque Française	French	France	Annually	1986–1988?	Ceased	Monographic series
Revue Belge du Cinéma	ISSN 0774-0115	Association des Professeurs pour (la promotion de) l'Éducation Cinématographique (APEC)	French	Belgium	Irregular	1976–1997	Ceased	Magazine
Revue de la Cinémathèque	ISSN 0843-6827	Cinémathèque québécoise	French	Canada	Bi-monthly	1989–	Current	Magazine
Revue du Cinéma	ISSN 0019-2635	Ligue française de l'enseignement et de l'éducation permanente	French	France	Monthly	1983–1992	Ceased	Magazine
Romanian Film	ISSN 0557-2630	Romaniafilm	English	Romania	Quarterly	1965–1989?	Ceased	Magazine
Scarlet Street	ISSN 1058-8612	Scarlet Street, Inc.	English	United States	Quarterly	1991–2006	Ceased	Magazine
Scenario	ISSN 1079-6851	EDesign Communications	English	United States	Quarterly	1995–2001?	Ceased	Magazine
Screen International	ISSN 0307-4617	Media Business Insight	English	United Kingdom	Monthly	1975–	Current	Magazine
Segnocinema	ISSN 0393-3865	Cineforum di Vicenza	Italian	Italy	Bi-monthly	1981–	Current	Magazine
Sentieri selvaggi	ISSN 1826-8013	Associazione Culturale Sentieri Selvaggi	Italian	Italy	Bi-monthly	1988–	Current	Magazine
Séquences	ISSN 0037-2412	Séquences	French	Canada	Bi-monthly	1955–	Current	Magazine
Sight & Sound	ISSN 0037-4806	British Film Institute (BFI)	English	United Kingdom	Monthly	1932–	Current	Magazine
Silent Picture	ISSN 0037-5209	First Media Press	English	United States	Quarterly	1968–1974	Ceased	Magazine
Skoop	ISSN 0166-1736	Stichting Skoop	Dutch	Netherlands	Monthly	1963–1993	Ceased	Magazine
Skrien	ISSN 0166-1787	Stichting Skrien	Dutch	Netherlands	Monthly	1968–2009	Ceased	Magazine
Soundtrack	ISSN 0771-6303	Luc Van de Ven	English	Belgium	Quarterly	1982–2002	Ceased	Magazine
Soviet Film	ISSN 0201-8373	Soveksportfilm (Sovexportfilm)	English	Union of Soviet Socialist Republics	Monthly	1957–1990	Ceased	Magazine
Stars	ISSN 0776-0698	A.S.B.L. Grand Angle-Opvac	French	Belgium	Quarterly	1988–2000	Ceased	Magazine
Stills	ISSN 0263-2608	Stills Magazine Ltd.	English	United Kingdom	Quarterly	1980–1987	Ceased	Magazine
Suspect Culture	ISSN 1914-8216	Suspect Culture	English	Canada	Unknown	1994–?	Ceased	Magazine
Take One	ISSN 1192-5507	Take One	English	Canada	Quarterly	1966–1979, 1992–2006	Ceased	Magazine
Téléciné	ISSN 0049-3287	Fédération Loisirs et Culture Cinématographiques (F.L.E.C.C.)	French	France	Monthly	1946–1978	Ceased	Magazine
The Three Stooges Journal		The Stoogeum	English	United States	Monthly	1975–	Current	Magazine
Total Film	ISSN 1366-3135	Future Publishing	English	United Kingdom	Monthly	1997-2024	Ceased	Magazine
Trafic	ISSN 1167-2846	Editions P.O.L.	French	France	Quarterly	1991–	Current	Magazine
Travelling	ISSN 0041-2120	Cinémathèque suisse	French	Switzerland	Irregular	1969–1980	Ceased	Magazine
Variety	ISSN 0042-2738	Penske Media Corporation	English	United States	Weekly	1905–	Current	Newspaper/magazine
Vertigo	ISSN 0968-7904	Vertigo Publications Ltd.	English	United Kingdom	Quarterly	1993–	Current	Magazine
Vertigo	ISSN 0985-1402	Capricci	French	France	Irregular	1987–	Current	Magazine
Video Watchdog	ISSN 1070-9991	Video Watchdog	English	United States	Bi-monthly	1990–2017	Ceased	Magazine
Vision	ISSN 0309-233X	British Academy of Film and Television Arts	English	United Kingdom	Quarterly	1976–1979	Ceased	Magazine
Western Clippings		Boyd Magers	English	United States	Monthly	1991–2025	Ceased	Magazine
WuBen (无本)		WuBen Film Magazine (无本电影杂志)	Simplified Chinese	Malaysia	Annually	2018–	Current	Magazine
Women & Film	ISSN 0049-7797	Women & Film	English	United States	Irregular	1972–1976	Ceased	Magazine
World Screen (环球银幕)	ISSN 1002-9974	China Film Press (中国电影出版社)	Simplified Chinese	China	Monthly	1985–	Current	Magazine
Young/Jeune Cinema & Theatre	ISSN 0139-7516	International Union of Students	French	Czechoslovakia	Quarterly	1964–1988	Ceased	Magazine
Z Filmtidsskrift	ISSN 0800-1464	Filmens Hus	Norwegian	Norway	Quarterly	1983–	Current	Magazine
Zoom	ISSN 1420-570X	Evangelischer Mediendienst Verein katholische Medienarbeit VKM	German	Switzerland	Monthly	1970–1999	Ceased	Magazine

== Scholarly journals ==
Title	ISSN	Publisher	Language	Country	Frequency	Publication range	Status	Document type
Adaptation	ISSN 1755-0637	Oxford University Press	English	United Kingdom	Semi-annually	2008–	Current	Scholarly journal
Alphaville: Journal of Film and Screen Media	ISSN 2009-4078	University College Cork	English	Ireland	Semi-annually	2011–	Current	Scholarly journal
Animation	ISSN 1746-8477	SAGE Publications	English	United States	Triannual	2006–	Current	Scholarly journal
Animation Journal	ISSN 1061-0308	AJ Press	English	United States	Annually	1992–	Current	Scholarly journal
Apparatus	ISSN 1543-5326		English, German, Russian, Central and Eastern European languages	Germany	Bi-annually	2015–	Current	Scholarly journal
Archivos de la Filmoteca	0214-6606	IVAC (Instituto Valenciano de Cinematografia)	Spanish	Spain	3 times per year	1989–	Current	Scholarly journal
Asian Cinema	1059-440X	Intellect Press/Asian Cinema Studies Society	English	United Kingdom	Semi-annually	1988–	Current	Scholarly journal
Australian Journal of Screen Theory	0313-4059	School of Drama, University of New South Wales	English	Australia	Irregular	1976-1985	Ceased	Scholarly journal
Beiträge zur Film und Fernsehwissenschaft	0232-718X	VISTAS Verlag	German	Germany	Irregular	1982–	Current	Scholarly journal
Black Camera	1536-3155	Indiana University Press & Black Film Center/Archive	English	United States	Semi-annually	2009–	Current	Scholarly journal
Camera Obscura	0270-5346	Duke University Press	English	United States	3 times per year	1976–	Current	Scholarly journal
Canadian Journal of Film Studies	0847-5911	Film Studies Association of Canada	English	Canada	Semi-annually	1990–	Current	Scholarly journal
CineAction	0826-9866	CineAction Collective	English	Canada	3 times per year	1985–	Current	Scholarly journal
Cinema	1010-3627	Schüren Verlag	German	Switzerland	Annually	1961–	Current	Scholarly journal
Cinema Journal	0009-7101	University of Texas Press, Journals Division	English	United States	Quarterly	1966–	Current	Scholarly journal
Cinéma - Revue Semestrielle d'Esthéthique et d'Histoire du Cinéma	1631-8226	Éditions Léo Scheer	French	France	Semi-annually	2001–2007	Ceased	Scholarly journal
Cinémas	1181-6945	Université de Montréal	French	Canada	3 times per year	1990–	Current	Scholarly journal
Cinémathèque	1241-8153	Cinémathèque française / Editions Yellow Now	French	France	Semi-annually	1992–2003	Ceased	Scholarly journal
Cinephile	1712-9265	University of British Columbia	English	Canada	Annually	2005-	Current	Scholarly journal
Cinesthesia	2372-403X	Grand Valley State University	English	United States	Biannual	2013–	Current	Online
Contemporary Cinema (当代电影)	ISSN 1002-4646	China Film Art Research Center (中国电影艺术研究中心)	Simplified Chinese	China	Monthly	1984–	Current	Scholarly journal
Early Popular Visual Culture	1746-0654	Routledge Journals	English	United Kingdom	3 times per year	2005–	Current	Scholarly journal
East-West Film Journal	ISSN 0891-6780	East-West Center	English	United States	Semi-annually	1986–1994	Ceased	Scholarly journal
Film & History	0360-3695	Center for the Study of Film and History	English	United States	Semi-annually	1971–	Current	Scholarly journal
Film and Philosophy	ISSN 1073-0427	Society for the Philosophic Study of the Contemporary Visual Arts	English	United States	Annually	1994–	Current	Scholarly journal
Film Art (电影艺术)	ISSN 0257-0181	China Film Press (中国电影出版社)	Simplified Chinese	China	Bi-monthly	1956–	Current	Scholarly journal
Film Criticism	0163-5069	Allegheny College	English	United States	3 times per year	1976–	Current	Scholarly journal
Film Culture	0015-1211	Film Culture Inc.	English	United States	Irregular	1955-1999	Ceased	Scholarly journal
Film Heritage	0015-1270	University of Dayton	English	United States	Quarterly	1965-1977	Ceased	Scholarly journal
Film Historia	1136-7385	Centro de Investigaciones Cinematográficas	English	Spain	3 times per year	1991–	Current	Scholarly journal
Film History: An International Journal	ISSN 0892-2160	Indiana University Press & John Libbey Publishing	English	United Kingdom	Quarterly	1987–	Current	Scholarly journal
Film-Konzepte	ISSN 1861-9622	edition text + kritik	German	Germany	Quarterly	2006–	Current	Scholarly journal
Film-Philosophy	1466-4615	Open Humanities Press	English	United Kingdom	Rolling	2006–	Current	Scholarly journal
Film Quarterly	ISSN 0015-1386	University of California Press	English	United States	Quarterly	1945-	Current	Scholarly journal
Film Studies	1469-0314	Manchester University Press	English	United Kingdom	Semi-annually	1999–2007; 2015–2020	Ceased	Scholarly journal
Film und Fernsehen	0323-3227	Filmverband Brandenburg	German	Germany	Quarterly	1973-1999	Ceased	Scholarly journal
Filmexil	0942-7074	Filmmuseum Berlin - Deutsche Kinemathek	German	Germany	Semi-annually	1992–2005	Ceased	Scholarly journal
Filmwissenschaftliche Beiträge	0015-1769	Hochschule für Film und Fernsehen der DDR	German	German Democratic Republic	Irregular	1968-1981	Ceased	Scholarly journal
Focales	1242-1898	Presses Universitaires de Nancy	French	France	Irregular	1992-1993	Ceased	Scholarly journal
Framework	0306-7661	Wayne State University Press	English	United States	Semi-annually	1975-	Current	Scholarly journal
Frauen und Film	0343-7736	Stroemfeld Verlag	German	Germany	Irregular	1974-	Current	Scholarly journal
Griffithiana	0393-3857	Cineteca del Friuli	Italian	Italy	Semi-annually	1978–2003	Ceased	Scholarly journal
Historical Journal of Film, Radio and Television	0143-9685	Routledge / International Association for Media and History (IAMHIST)	English	United Kingdom	Quarterly	1981-	Current	Scholarly journal
Hitchcock Annual	1662-5518	Hitchcock Annual Corporation	English	United States	Annually	1992-	Current	Scholarly journal
Ikon	0019-1744	Istituto di ricerca sulla comunicazione	French	Italy	Quarterly	1962-	Current	Scholarly journal
Imagofagia	1852-9550	Asociación Argentina de Estudios de Cine y Audiovisual (AsAECA)	Spanish	Argentina	Biannual	2009-	Current	Scholarly journal
Iris	0751-7033	Institut pour la recherche sur l'image et le son	French	France	Irregular	1983-	Current	Scholarly journal
Journal of African Cinemas	1754-9221	Intellect	English	United Kingdom	3 times per year	2009-	Current	Scholarly journal
Journal of British Cinema and Television	1743-4521	Edinburgh University Press	English	United Kingdom	Semi-annually	2004-	Current	Scholarly journal
Journal of Chinese Cinemas	1750-8061	Intellect	English	United Kingdom	3 times per year	2007-	Current	Scholarly journal
Journal of Film and Video	0742-4671	University of Illinois Press / University Film & Video Association (UFVA)	English	United States	Quarterly	1984-	Current	Scholarly journal
The Journal of Film Music	1087-7142	International Film Music Society	English	United States	Irregular	2002-	Current	Scholarly journal
Journal of Japanese & Korean Cinema	1756-4905	Intellect	English	United Kingdom	3 times per year	2009-	Current	Scholarly journal
Journal of Popular British Cinema	1461-104X	Flicks Books / Society for the Study of Popular British Cinema	English	United Kingdom	Annually	1998–2002	Ceased	Scholarly journal
Journal of Popular Film & Television	0195-6051	Heldref Publications	English	United States	Quarterly	1978-	Current	Scholarly journal
Journal of the University Film & Video Association	0734-919X	University Film & Video Association (UFVA)	English	United States	Quarterly	1968-1983	Ceased	Scholarly journal
Jump Cut	0146-5546	Jump Cut Associates	English	United States	Irregular	1974-	Current	Scholarly journal
Kinema	1192-6252	University of Waterloo, Department of Fine Arts (Film Studies)	English	Canada	Semi-annually	1993-	Current	Scholarly journal
Kinetoscopio	0121-3776	Centro Colombo Americano	Spanish	Colombia	Quarterly	1990-	Current	Scholarly journal
Kintop	1024-1906	Stroemfeld Verlag	German	Germany	Annually	1992–2006	Ceased	Scholarly journal
Kosmorama	0023-4222	Det Danske Filminstitut	Danish	Denmark	Semi-annually	1954-	Current	Scholarly journal
Kwartalnik Filmowy	0452-9502	Instytut Sztuki	Polish	Poland	Quarterly	1951-	Current	Scholarly journal
Literature/Film Quarterly	0090-4260	Salisbury State University	English	United States	Quarterly	1973-	Current	Scholarly journal
Living Pictures	1467-0577	Flicks Books	English	United Kingdom	Semi-annually	2001–2003	Ceased	Scholarly journal
manycinemas	2192-9181		English	Germany	Semi-annually	2011-2012	Ceased	Scholarly journal
Millennium Film Journal	1064-5586	Millennium Film Workshop	English	United States	Semi-annually	1977–	Current	Scholarly journal
Mise au Point	2261-9623	Association Française des Enseignants et Chercheurs en Cinéma et Audiovisuel (AFECCAV)	French	France	annually	2009-	Current	Scholarly journal
Montage AV	0942-4954	Schüren Verlag GmbH / Gesellschaft für Theorie & Geschichte audiovisueller Kommunikation	German	Germany	Semi-annually	1992-	Current	Scholarly journal
MovEast	1215-234X	Hungarian National Film Archive	English	Hungary	Irregular	1991-2003	Ceased	Scholarly journal
Movie Literature (电影文学)	ISSN 0495-5692	Changchun Film Group Periodical Publishing (长影集团期刊出版公司)	Simplified Chinese	China	Bi-weekly	1958-	Current	Scholarly journal
The Moving Image	1532-3978	University of Minnesota Press / Association for Moving Image Archivists (AMIA)	English	United States	Semi-annually	2001-	Current	Scholarly journal
Music, Sound, and the Moving Image	1753-0768	Liverpool University Press	English	United Kingdom	Semi-annually	2007-	Current	Scholarly journal
New Cinemas: Journal of Contemporary Film	1474-2756	Intellect	English	United Kingdom	3 times per year	2002-	Current	Scholarly journal
New Review of Film and Television Studies	1740-0309	Routledge	English	United Kingdom	3 times per year	2003-	Current	Scholarly journal
Nouvelles Vues	1712-8242	Université Laval - online journal	French/English	Canada	Semi-annually	2003-	Current	Scholarly journal
Panoptikum	1730–7775	Wydawnictwo Uniwersytetu Gdańskiego	Polish	Poland	Semi-annually	1995-	Current	Scholarly journal
Persistence of Vision	1077-4629	City University of New York, Film Faculty	English	United States	Annually	1984-1997	Ceased	Scholarly journal
Post Script	0277-9897	Texas A&M University-Commerce	English	United States	3 times per year	1981-	Current	Scholarly journal
Projections: The Journal for Movies and Mind	1934-9688	Berghahn Books	English	United Kingdom	Semi-annually	2007-	Current	Scholarly journal
Quarterly Review of Film and Video	1050-9208	Routledge	English	United States	Quarterly	1962-	Current	Scholarly journal
Quarterly Review of Film Studies	0146-0013	Redgrave Publishing Company	English	United Kingdom	Quarterly	1976-1989	Ceased	Scholarly journal
Science Fiction Film and Television	1754-3770	Liverpool University Press	English	United Kingdom	Semi-annually	2008-	Current	Scholarly journal
Screen	0036-9543	Oxford University Press	English	United Kingdom	Quarterly	1959-	Current	Scholarly journal
Secuencias	1134-6795	Universidad Autonoma de Madrid	Spanish	Spain	Semi-annually	1994-	Current	Scholarly journal
The Soundtrack	1751-4193	Intellect	English	United Kingdom	3 times per year	2008-	Current	Scholarly journal
Studies in Australasian Cinema	1750-3175	Intellect	English	United Kingdom	3 times per year	2007-	Current	Scholarly journal
Studies in Documentary Film	1750-3280	Intellect	English	United Kingdom	3 times per year	2007-	Current	Scholarly journal
Studies in European Cinema	1741-1548	Intellect	English	United Kingdom	3 times per year	2004-	Current	Scholarly journal
Studies in French Cinema	1471-5880	Intellect	English	United Kingdom	3 times per year	2001-	Current	Scholarly journal
Studies in Hispanic Cinemas	1478-0488	Intellect	English	United Kingdom	Semi-annually	2004-	Current	Scholarly journal
Studies in Russian & Soviet Cinema	1750-3132	Intellect	English	United Kingdom	3 times per year	2007-	Current	Scholarly journal
Studies in South Asian Film & Media	1756-4921	Intellect	English	United Kingdom	Semi-annually	2009-	Current	Scholarly journal
Théorème	1159-7941	Institut de Recherche sur le Cinéma et l'Audiovisuel (IRCAV)	French	France	Irregular	1990-	Current	Scholarly journal
Velvet Light Trap	0149-1830	University of Texas Press	English	United States	Semi-annually	1971-	Current	Scholarly journal
Versus	0168-2121	Socialistiese Uitgeverij Nijmegen (SUN)	Dutch	Netherlands	3 times per year	1982-1992	Ceased	Scholarly journal
Wide Angle	0160-6840	Ohio University Department of Film / Athens International Film Festival	English	United States	Quarterly	1976-1999	Ceased	Scholarly journal

== Bibliography ==
- Slide, Anthony. International Film, Radio, and Television Journals. Westport, Conn.: Greenwood Press, 1985. xiv, 428 p.
- Loughney, Katharine. Film, Television, and Video Periodicals: A Comprehensive Annotated. New York: Garland Publ, 1991. 431
