= Ted Okuda =

American author and film historian (born 1953)

- Born: December 8, 1953 (age 72)
- Occupations: Non-fiction writer; film historian

Ted Okuda (born December 8, 1953) is an American non-fiction author and film historian. He has many books and magazine features to his credit, under his own name and in collaboration with others.

== Career ==
Okuda's long-held interest in movie comedies led to his first book, The Columbia Comedy Shorts (1986, with Edward Watz), an in-depth account of Columbia Pictures' short-subject department, detailing the production of two-reel comedies starring The Three Stooges, Buster Keaton, Andy Clyde, Charley Chase, and Gus Schilling & Richard Lane, among many others. Since the book's first publication in 1986, Okuda has explored other areas of popular culture, including science fiction, children's television, and silent films.

Okuda's other books include Dorothy Lee: The Life and Films of the Wheeler and Woolsey Girl (2013, with Jamie Brotherton), Stan Without Ollie: The Stan Laurel Solo Films (2012, with James L. Neibaur), Chicago TV Horror Movie Shows (2007, with Mark Yurkiw), The Soundies Book: A Revised and Expanded Guide (2007, with Scott MacGillivray), Charlie Chaplin at Keystone and Essanay (2005, with David Maska), The Golden Age of Chicago Children's Television (2004, with Jack Mulqueen), and The Jerry Lewis Films (1995, with Neibaur). He also contributed chapters to the books Science Fiction America (edited by David J. Hogan) and Guilty Pleasures of the Horror Film (edited by Gary and Susan Svehla), and wrote the foreword for MacGillivray's Castle Films: A Hobbyist's Guide. His articles, interviews, and reviews have appeared in such publications as Filmfax, Classic Images, Cult Movies, Classic Film Collector, The Big Reel, and Movie Collector's World.

He has also appeared on television, usually with popular movie host and Stooge expert Rich Koz.
