= Nuestro Cinema =

Spanish film magazine (1932–1936)

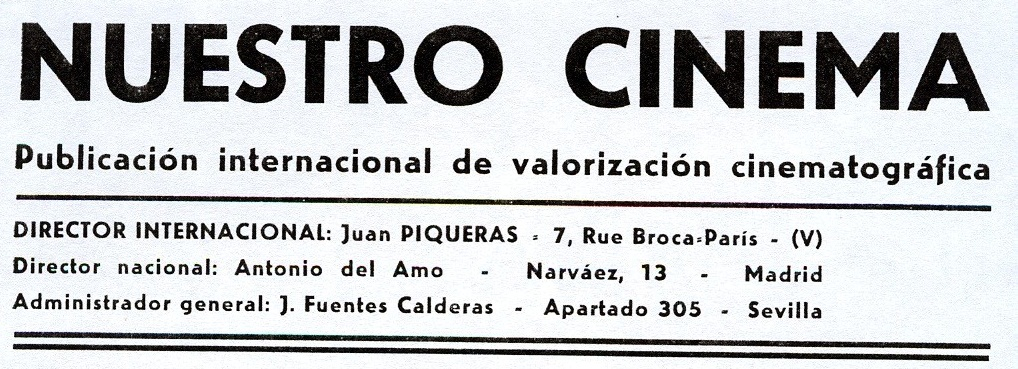
- Categories: Film magazine
- Founder: Juan Piqueras
- Founded: 1932
- First issue: June 1932
- Final issue: February 1936
- Country: Spain
- Based in: Madrid
- Language: Spanish
- ISSN: 2107-5662
- OCLC: 1026600646

Nuestro Cinema (Spanish: Our Cinema) was a film magazine which was published in Spain between 1932 and 1936 with a one-year interruption. Its subtitle was Cuadernos Internacionales de Valorizacion Cinematografica (Spanish: International Notebooks of Cinematographic Evaluation). It was one of the earliest Spanish publications in its category and was the first Communist film magazine in Spain.

== History and profile ==
Nuestro Cinema was founded by Juan Piqueras in 1932. In the first issue dated June 1932 the magazine billed itself as the "best" professional film publication free from superficial and sentimental contents unlike other film publications. It was affiliated with the Communist Party and had a Marxist orientation. From its start in June 1932 to March 1933 Nuestro Cinema came out monthly.

Piqueras edited the magazine from his Paris home. Nuestro Cinema was published in Barcelona, but its editorial office was based in Madrid. Piqueras published many articles in the magazine on the history of Spanish cinema. These writings would be later published as a book. The magazine frequently featured theoretical and historical issues about cinema. It exclusively focused on left-wing movies, including those produced in the Soviet Union. Nuestro Cinema also covered political agitation through articles on strikes, land reform, and the proclamation of the Catalan Statute. Major contributors of the magazine were Antonio del Amo Algara, César M. Arconada, Juan Manuel Plaza, Germaine Dulac, Léon Moussinac, René Clair, Joris Ivens and Béla Balázs.

Nuestro Cinema temporarily ceased publication in October 1933 and was restarted in January 1935. In the second period its communist approach was not very evident. It permanently folded in February 1936 because of financial problems and Juan Piqueras’s health problems. The title of Nuestro Cine film magazine, which was started in 1961, was a reference to Nuestro Cinema.
