= Cinema Nuovo =

Italian film magazine (1952–1996)

- Editor-in-chief: Joseph Grieco
- Categories: Film magazine
- Frequency: Fortnightly (1952–1958); Bi-monthly (1958–1996)
- Founder: Guido Aristarco
- Founded: 1952
- First issue: 15 December 1952
- Final issue: 1996
- Country: Italy
- Based in: Milan
- Language: Italian

Cinema Nuovo was a left-leaning Italian film magazine existed between 1952 and 1996. It was headquartered in Milan, Italy.

== History and profile ==
Cinema Nuovo was established by film critic Guido Aristarco in 1952. The first issue was published in Milan on 15 December 1952. The founding company was La Scuola, Arzigliano. Guido Aristarco also directed the magazine, which first published fortnightly and from the July-August 1958 issue it became bimonthly. The magazine had offices in Rome, Paris, New York City, Mexico City and Prague.

Cinema Nuovo had a Marxist stance and was one of the targets of the Italian government like other left-leaning publications. Guido Aristarco supported neorealist cinema of Italy through his articles published in the magazine. Joseph Grieco was among the editors-in-chief, and Rudi Berger was one of the contributors. From 1954 to 1956 Cesare Zavattini published photo-essays in Cinema Nuovo.

The magazine folded in 1996. Spanish film magazine Nuestro Cine modeled on Cinema Nuovo and followed the approach of Guido Aristarco. The other Spanish film magazine inspired from Cinema Nuovo and its founder Guido Aristarco was Objetivo.

== See also ==
- List of film periodicals
