= Juan Piqueras Martínez =

Spanish film critic

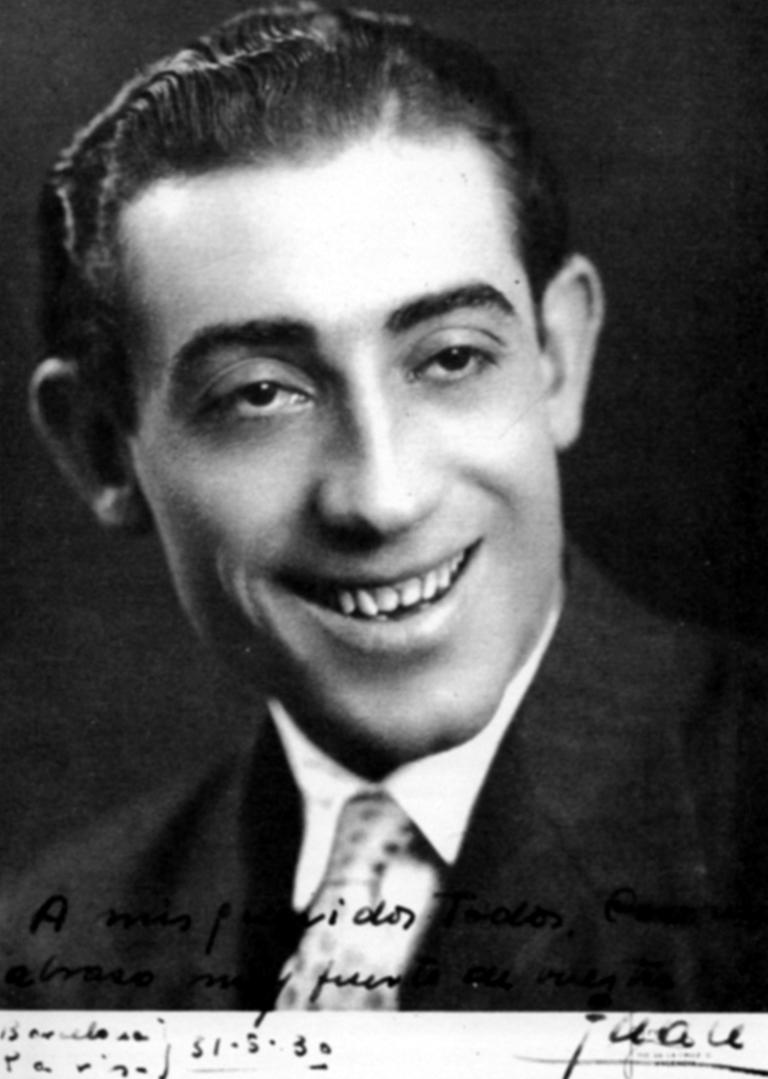
- Born: 1904; Arcís Field, València
- Died: July 1936 (aged 31–32); Venta de Baños
- Occupations: Film critic, film historian, journalist, poet
- Political party: Communist Party of Spain

Juan Piqueras Martínez (1904 – July 1936) was a Spanish film critic, film historian and journalist.

== Biography ==
Born into a family of day laborers, Piqueras went to school irregularly due to the poor economic conditions of his family and was mostly self-taught. He entered the intellectual and literary circle of Valencia as a poet, and soon became interested in cinema from 1919. He left for Madrid, and became a prominent name in the film circles of the Generation of '27.

In 1925, he founded with Ernesto Giménez Caballero and Luis Buñuel the first film club in the Spanish State at the Residencia de Estudiantes in Madrid, where he became close to Buñuel and Salvador Dalí. With Buñuel, he directed the film club of La Gaseta Literària. An ideological Marxist and admirer of Soviet cinema, he joined the Communist Party of Spain in 1930. At the beginning of June 1930, Juan Piqueras prepared his move to Paris, as a correspondent and contributor from abroad to Popular Film, Mirador, La Gaceta Literaria, El Sol, La Semana Gráfica, Crónica, among other leading publications of the time. He was René Clair's assistant in A Nous la Liberté. In 1932 he created the magazine Nuestro Cinema, which would achieve notable international prestige.

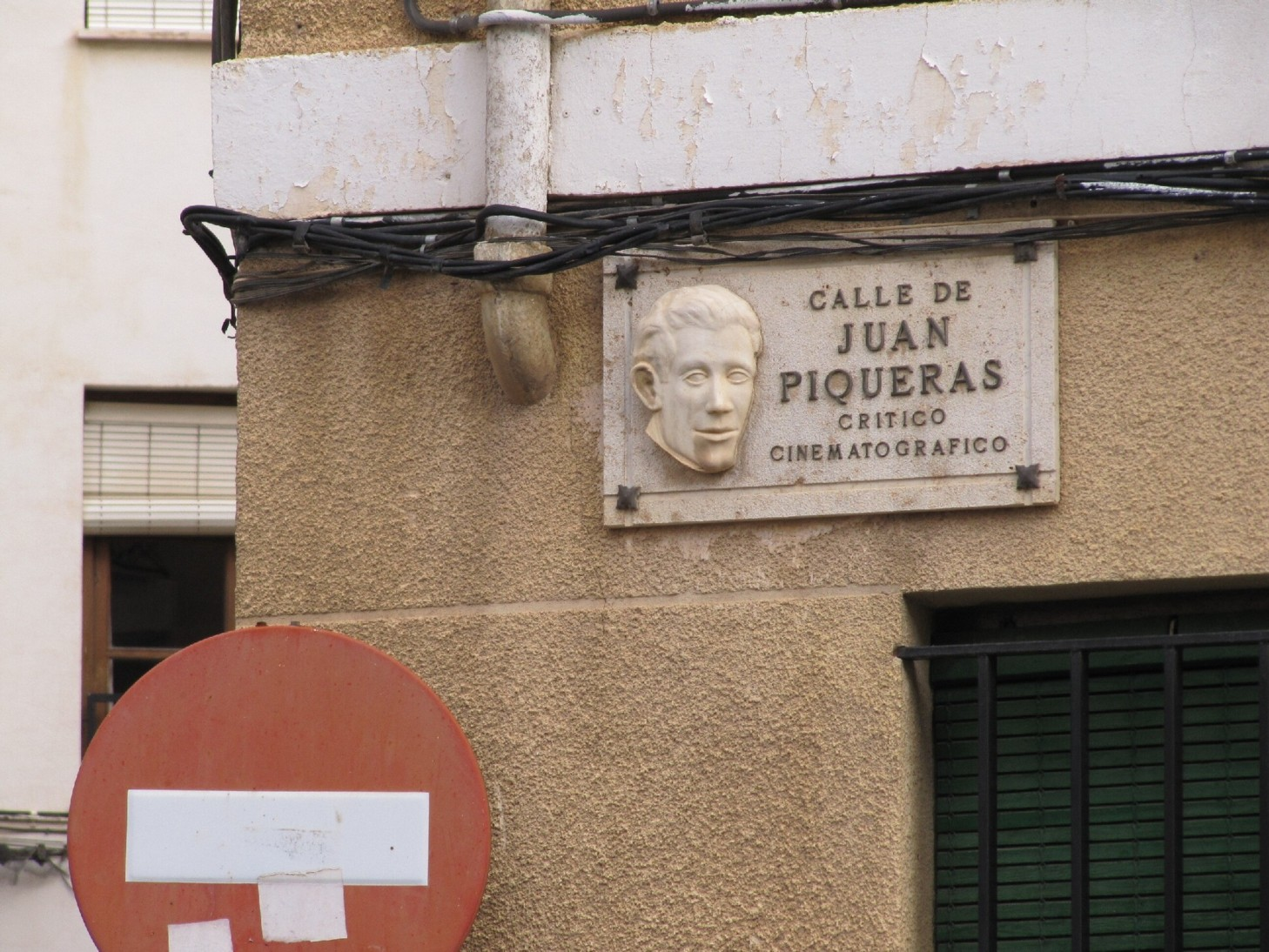
Memorial plaque of Juan Piqueras in Requena

In mid-July 1936, following the victory of the Popular Front, Piqueras was invited by some friends to come to Spain, and took a train from Paris to Oviedo. On the way, he suffered a relapse of his stomach ulcer, which opened up, causing him to vomit blood, forcing him to get off the train and rest at the inn at Venta de Baños station. It was in this inn and in this situation that he was informed of coup d'état of July 18. His friends to take him to a safe place, but the area was quickly taken by the rebels and communications were interrupted. At the end of July, on an unknown date and place, Juan Piqueras was taken and shot by Francoist rebels and his remains thrown into a mass grave. His fate was not publicly known until it was revealed by the French newspaper L'Humanité, in an obituary alongside that of the also murdered Federico García Lorca in February 1937.
