= David Quinlan (film critic) =

British film critic

David Quinlan (born 1941) is an English film critic, journalist, film historian and author.

Quinlan was the film critic for the TV Times from 1972 to 2006. Other contributions to film periodicals include Films Illustrated, Photoplay, Films and Filming and Film Review.

He co-edited the film review website PicturesThatTalk with Alan Frank.

== Books ==
Publications include:

- The Illustrated Directory of Film Stars (five editions - 1981, 1986, 1991, 1996, 2000) - retitled Quinlan's Film Stars for fourth and fifth editions, and The Film Lover's Companion for the US printing of fourth edition
- The Illustrated Directory of Film Directors (two editions - 1983, 1999) - retitled Quinlan's Film Directors for second edition
- British Sound Films: The Studio Years 1928-1959 (1984)
- The Illustrated Directory of Film Character Actors (three editions - 1985, 1995, 2004) - retitled Quinlan's Character Stars for third edition and The Illustrated Encyclopedia of Movie Character Actors for US printing of first edition
- Wicked Women of the Screen (1987)
- Quinlan's Illustrated Directory of Film Comedy Stars (1992)
- TV Times Film Guide (six annual editions from 1994)
- Tom Hanks: a Career in Orbit (1997)
