= Nuestro Cine =

Spanish film magazine (1961–1971)

- Categories: Film magazine
- Founded: 1961
- Final issue: 1971
- Country: Spain
- Language: Spanish

Nuestro Cine was a Marxist film magazine in Spain which was in circulation between 1961 and 1971. Its title was a reference to another film magazine, Nuestro Cinema, published between 1932 and 1936 in Spain.

== History and profile ==
Nuestro Cine was established in 1961. The magazine advocated the idea that the cinema was a way of uncovering reality, its social structures, and the basis of external appearances. Its theoretical basis was Marxist literary theory and literary criticism, particularly the views developed by György Lukács which were interpreted by the Italian film critic Guido Aristarco.

The major contributors of Nuestro Cine included José Luis Guarner, Ricardo Muñoz Suay and Vicente Molina Foix. The magazine adopted a Marxist approach in dealing with the films and film-related topics. However, between 1965 and 1967 it was among the supporters of the new Spanish cinema which was funded by the Franco government. It folded in 1971.
