= Broadcast quality =

Broadcast quality is a term to denote the quality achieved by professional video cameras and time base correctors (TBC) used for broadcast television, usually in standard definition. As the standards for commercial television broadcasts have changed from analog television using analog video to digital television using digital video, the term has generally fallen out of use. Manufacturers have used it to describe both professional and "prosumer" or "semi-professional" devices.

The term is also used in its literal sense in broadcasting jargon in judging the fitness of audio or video for broadcast.

== See also ==
- Audiophile
- Videophile
