= Bob King (editor) =

Bob King (a.k.a. Robert B. King) was the editor and general manager of Classic Images, a monthly tabloid of 60 to 144 pages with news and articles about movies and movie people of the past, primarily pre-1960. He was also the editor and general manager of Films of the Golden Age, a quarterly magazine for movie enthusiasts.

== Personal information ==
Robert Boyd King was born in Iowa City, Iowa on 17 October 1949. He graduated from the University of Iowa in 1972.

== Other projects ==
He is the co-author of the autobiographical I Wasn't Like the Cautious Man: The Life of Roy C. Smith As Told to Robert B. King. It details the life and career of Roy C. Smith the founder of American Petroleum Company based in Davenport, Iowa.
