= Octubre (magazine) =

Spanish literary magazine (1933–1934)

- Categories: Literary magazine
- Founder: Rafael Alberti; María Teresa León; César Muñoz Arconada
- Founded: 1933
- First issue: Summer 1933
- Final issue: 1934
- Country: Spain
- Based in: Madrid
- Language: Spanish

Octubre (Spanish: October) was a Communist literary magazine which was published in Madrid between 1933 and 1934. The subtitle of the magazine was Escritores y artistas revolutionarios (Spanish: Revolutionary writers and artists).

== History and profile ==
The founders of Octubre were Rafael Alberti, his wife María Teresa León and César Arconada. The magazine was started in Summer 1933 after the visit of Alberti and León to the Soviet Union. Some of the contributors included Antonio Machado, Emilio Prados and Luis Cernuda.

Octubre was published on high-quality paper and frequently featured photographs most of which displayed scenes from Soviet life. The magazine had a Marxist orientation. It also adopted a Soviet-type avant-garde literary approach and had a Stalinist political stance. Although the magazine was not financed by the Comintern, it featured some articles, essays, and photos provided by the Soviets.

== See also ==
- List of avant-garde magazines
