= Videophile =

Enthusiast of Video media

A videophile is one who is concerned with achieving high-quality results in the recording and playback of movies, TV programs, and other means of visual media. The term gained wider use in the late 1970s and early 1980s as consumer video formats such as Betamax, VHS, and LaserDisc became available for home use. As home theater technology developed, videophile came to refer to individuals interested in optimizing televisions, projectors, screen calibration, and surround sound systems in order to recreate a cinema-like viewing experience at home.

== Criteria ==
Similar to audiophile values, videophile values may be applied at all stages of the chain: the initial audio-visual recording, the video production process, and the playback (usually in a home setting). Some of the aspects of video that most videophiles are concerned with include frame rate, color system, resolution, compression artifacts, motion artifacts, video noise, screen size, poor upscaling, etc.

== Origin ==
The term "videophile" was popularized by Tallahassee, Florida-based attorney and writer Jim Lowe, editor and publisher of The Videophile's Newsletter, the first issue of which appeared in the summer of 1976. This was the first publication to unite fans of the Sony Betamax home video recorder (and later VHS, introduced in 1977). The newsletter later became The Videophile, a nationally distributed magazine, the last issue of which was published in 1981.

== See also ==
- Audiophile
- Broadcast quality
- Professional audio
