= Film Review (magazine) =

British film magazine

- Cover of the first issue featuring Dennis Price and Gisèle Préville in The Dancing Years
- Categories: Film
- Frequency: Monthly
- First issue: 1950
- Final issue: December 2008
- Country: United Kingdom
- Language: English
- ISSN: 0001-0413

ABC Film Review was a magazine which began regular releases in 1951 after a 1950 trial. The name was kept until April 1972, but by May 1972 was shortened to simply Film Review. The final issue (#701) came out December 2008. In the 1990s, it advertised itself as "Britain's longest-running film magazine" on the cover.

== Background ==
It was originally tied in with ABC Cinemas. It was published by Associated British in association with Pathé and produced by Axtell Publications Ltd. of London, and at the outset the only credited contributor was James McCrossan.

== Cost ==
The 3-issue trial in 1950 was just 20 pages and cost three old pence. After the trial's success, it became a full monthly magazine from January 1951 costing 4d until December 1951.

The price was increased in January 1952 to 6d and stayed at 6d until August 1968, which was a complete run except for the issues for August and September, 1959, which were not published owing to a national printers' strike in the UK that summer (a fate that befell many magazines and newspapers at the time). Price from September 1968 was 9d until September 1970, when decimalisation was approaching, and the price changed to one shilling (5 new pence) in October 1970. The price changed again in May 1972, when it increased to 10p. At this time, the name changed to just Film Review; the ABC was dropped from then on. It continued to appear as a monthly magazine until 2008. The next-to-last edition, a double-issue, number 699/700, for August/September 2008, edited by Nikki Baughan, had 220 pages and was priced at £4.99.

== Writers ==
Contributors included Peter S. Haigh, Vincent Firth, Norman Taylor, David Richardson, Tony Crawley, Marianne Gray, Judy Sloane, Alan Jones, Tom Hutchinson, Nigel Robinson, Jason Caro, Roald Rynning, Howard Maxford, Cleaver Patterson, James Cameron-Wilson, Michael Darvell, Stephen Applebaum, Anwar Brett, Lorien Haynes and James Mottram. There was a readers' Q&A page with questions answered originally by Peter Noble and later on David McGillivray. James Cameron-Wilson, a commissioning editor of the magazine, also eventually took over this section.

== Related works ==
Film Review ceased printed publication by Visual Imagination in 2009. It has no connection with the Film Review annual which was launched in 1944 and last published by Signum Books. Originally edited by F. Maurice Speed, it was taken over by James Cameron-Wilson and was then jointly edited by Michael Darvell and Mansel Stimpson with Cameron-Wilson serving as executive editor. Its 70th edition appeared on 2 November 2015. In December 2015, the annual was launched as a website, Film Review Daily, edited by Cameron-Wilson and with regular contributors including Cameron-Wilson, Stimpson, Darvell, George Savvides and Chad Kennerk.
