= Ernesto Giménez Caballero =

Spanish writer, diplomat and pioneer of Fascism in Spain

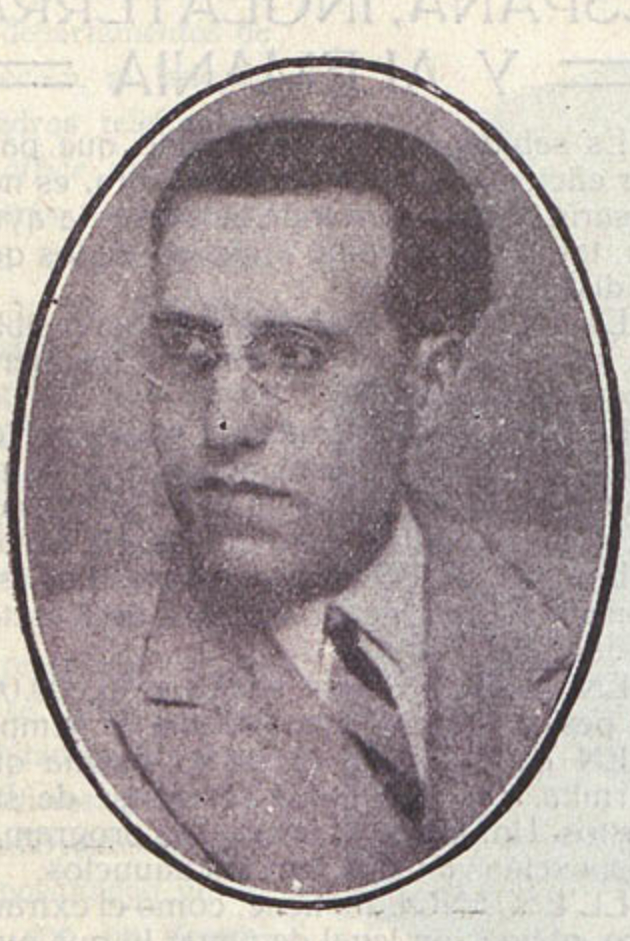
- Born: Ernesto Giménez Caballero; 2 August 1899; Madrid
- Died: 15 May 1988 (aged 88); Madrid
- Education: Central University, University of Strasbourg
- Notable work: Genio de España, La Nueva Catolicidad
- Political party: Falange Española Tradicionalista y de las JONS

Ernesto Giménez Caballero (2 August 1899 – 14 May 1988), also known as Gecé, was a Spanish writer, diplomat, and pioneer of Fascism in Spain. Director and founder of the avant-garde magazine La Gaceta Literaria (1927–1932), his work has been categorized as being part of the Futurist and Surrealist movement, while Stanley G. Payne has described him as the Spanish Gabriele d'Annunzio.

== Education and military service ==
He took the baccalaureate education at the Instituto San Isidro. Between 1916 and 1920 he took studies in Letras at the Central University (where he wrote for the Conservative journal Filosofía y Letras and helped to launch a "Group of Socialist Students", some of whose members would soon after establish the Spanish Communist Party), and then collaborated for a time at the Centro de Estudios Históricos before moving to the University of Strasbourg to work as lecturer in Spanish. Influenced by José Ortega y Gasset's critique of democracy, however, he became a nationalist in the vein of Miguel de Unamuno.

He performed his military service in Spanish Morocco, although his 1923 book on the experience, Notas Marruecas de un Soldado, caused such outrage amongst the generals that he was imprisoned for a time before being pardoned by General and Dictator Miguel Primo de Rivera.

== The avant-garde years and the conversion to fascism ==
As founder and Director of the avant-garde magazine La Gaceta Literaria (1927–1932), literary critic for El Sol newspaper, and collaborator of Ortega y Gasset's Revista de Occidente, in those years he published his most notable avant-garde works: Carteles y Los toros, las castañuelas y la Virgen (1927), Yo, inspector de alcantarillas (surreal stories, 1928), Hércules jugando a los dados (1928), Julepe de menta (1929) y Trabalenguas sobre España (1931).

Giménez Caballero was also involved in the rising experimental film scene in Madrid, opening a cineclub with Juan Piqueras Martínez and Luis Buñuel in 1928. His works as a filmmaker in those years include Noticiario del cineclub (1930), Esencia de verbena (1930), and Los judíos de patria Española (1931).

But in 1928 he went to Italy and struck up friendships with such fascist thinkers as Giuseppe Bottai, Giovanni Gentile, Curzio Malaparte and Filippo Tommaso Marinetti, eventually becoming an adherent of fascist beliefs himself.

Having had already made a name for himself as an aesthetic writer, he announced his conversion to fascism in 1928 in an article in La Gaceta Literaria, a journal he had founded in 1927. Dubbed the "Spanish d'Annunzio", his conversion saw him cut off from Spain's high culture which was dominated by Liberals, becoming what he described as "a literary Robinson Crusoe". In February 1929 he published "Carta a un compañero de la Joven España", considered the first intellectual manifesto of Spanish fascism.

== Ideology ==
Being married to an Italian, sister of the Italian Consul at Strasburg, Giménez Caballero's fascism was largely derived from the Italian model of fascism whilst also including an international dimension in which he saw fascism as the future of the Latin Catholic world. He had little sympathy for National Socialism, which he saw as too Protestant and northern, even going so far as foreseeing war between fascism and national socialism.

Writing extensively about the decadence of modern society and fascism in his book 1932 Genio de España, Giménez Caballero called for a re-establishment of the Spanish Empire to its former glory under a Mussolini-led Latin union. His follow-up, La Nueva Catolicidad, underlined his commitment to Catholicism within a fascist framework.

Giménez Caballero was a promoter of cultural Philosephardism, publishing several philosephardist pieces himself in La Gaceta Literaria. His Philosephardism—not exempt from contradictions—was no impediment to the outburst of antisemitic ideas in Gecé, particularly once his Fascist romanism affirmed, although there is no clear boundary in the chronology.

Gimenez Caballero declared his support for the plans of Ramiro Ledesma Ramos in La Conquista del Estado (The Conquest of the State) and became involved in his Juntas de Ofensiva Nacional-Sindicalista. However the writer was no political organizer and generally left control of the movement to Ledesma. He went on to join the Falange Española y de las JONS and served on the council of the movement. However he was at odds with many of the ideas of José Antonio Primo de Rivera, son of his former redeemer from jail, General Miguel Primo de Rivera. He was expelled from the Falange in 1936 after he began to work with the Mallorca banker Juan March Ordinas in the Partido Español de Patrones y Empresarios. Later readmitted to the Falange, he fled to Italy during the Spanish Civil War, but from abroad encouraged Francisco Franco to merge the Falangists with the Carlists. He was rewarded for his encouragement with the post of Vice-Secretary for National Education in Franco's inaugural cabinet.

== Later years ==
One of the most bizarre of Giménez Caballero's actions was perhaps his unsuccessful attempt to marry Primo de Rivera's sister, Pilar, to Adolf Hitler, as a way to "soften" and "catholicize" the latter.

After the Spanish Civil War he spent most of his time abroad, holding positions in the Spanish embassies in Paraguay and Brazil before being appointed ambassador to Paraguay in 1958, a position he held for 12 years. In later life he continued as a writer, winning his final writing prize, Premio Espejo de España, for his work Retratos españoles (bastante parecidos) in 1985 whilst also directing a series of documentary films. He claimed later in life, in his 80s to have become a follower of anarcho-syndicalism.

Giménez Caballero, who spent his last months following a surgical procedure to treat cataract in his house in the El Viso colony under an ill condition and dealing with auditive disorders, finally died on 14 May 1988.

== Bibliography ==
- Álvarez Chillida, Gonzalo (2002). El antisemitismo en España: la imagen del judío, 1812–2002. Madrid: Marcial Pons Ediciones de Historia. ISBN 84-95379-44-9.
- Foard, Douglas W. (1975). "The Forgotten Falangist: Ernesto Gimenez Caballero". Journal of Contemporary History. 10 (1): 3–18. doi:10.1177/002200947501000101. JSTOR 260135. S2CID 153480780.
- González Cuevas, Pedro Carlos (2001). "Un escritor olvidado". Revista de Libros (53). Fundación Caja Madrid: 4–6. JSTOR 30229535.
- Mainer, José-Carlos (2005). "Ernesto Giménez Caballero o la inoportunidad". Ernesto Giménez Caballero. Casticismo, nacionalismo y vanguardia (PDF). Fundación Santander Central Hispano. pp. IX–LXVIII. ISBN 84-89913-66-8.
- Rother, Bernd (2000). "España y los judíos: de los albores del siglo XX a la Guerra Civil". Los judíos en la España contemporánea: historia y visiones, 1898–1998. Cuenca: Ediciones de la Universidad de Castilla-La Mancha. pp. 153–172. ISBN 84-8427-044-0.
- Selva, Enrique (2000). Ernesto Giménez Caballero entre la vanguardia y el fascismo. Valencia: Editorial Pre-Textos. ISBN 84-8191-325-1.
