= Films of the Golden Age =

Magazine covering 1910-60 film

- Frequency: Quarterly
- Publisher: Lee Enterprises
- Founded: 1962
- Country: United States
- Based in: Muscatine, Iowa
- Language: English
- Website: www.filmsofthegoldenage.com
- ISSN: 1083-5369

Films of the Golden Age was a quarterly magazine devoted to films and movie stars from the 1910–1960 film era in Hollywood. It was published by the Muscatine Journal division of Lee Enterprises, Inc., the same publishers of the monthly Classic Images magazine. Bob King had been its editor and general manager since its inception. It was discontinued in 2025 with 122 issues having been published.

== History and profile ==
Films of the Golden Age was founded in 1995. The magazine is based in Muscatine, Iowa. Each issue typically profiles a half dozen performers from classic films, major stars and supporting players as well as less-remembered individuals in the film industry during the era. Most issues also have an article or two devoted to a specific film from the period.

Among the many performers who have been covered by the magazine over the years were Tyrone Power, Butterfly McQueen, Olivia de Havilland, Betty Hutton, Robert Mitchum, Noël Coward, Anita Page, Conway Tearle, Edna May Oliver, James Dean, Dorothy Dandridge, Gene Kelly, Esther Williams, Una Merkel, and directors Michael Curtiz, and W. S. Van Dyke.

The late Turner Classic Movies host Robert Osborne proclaimed Films of the Golden Age as one of his favorite magazines.

== See also ==
- List of film periodicals
