= La Gaceta Literaria =

Literary magazine in Spain (1927–1932)

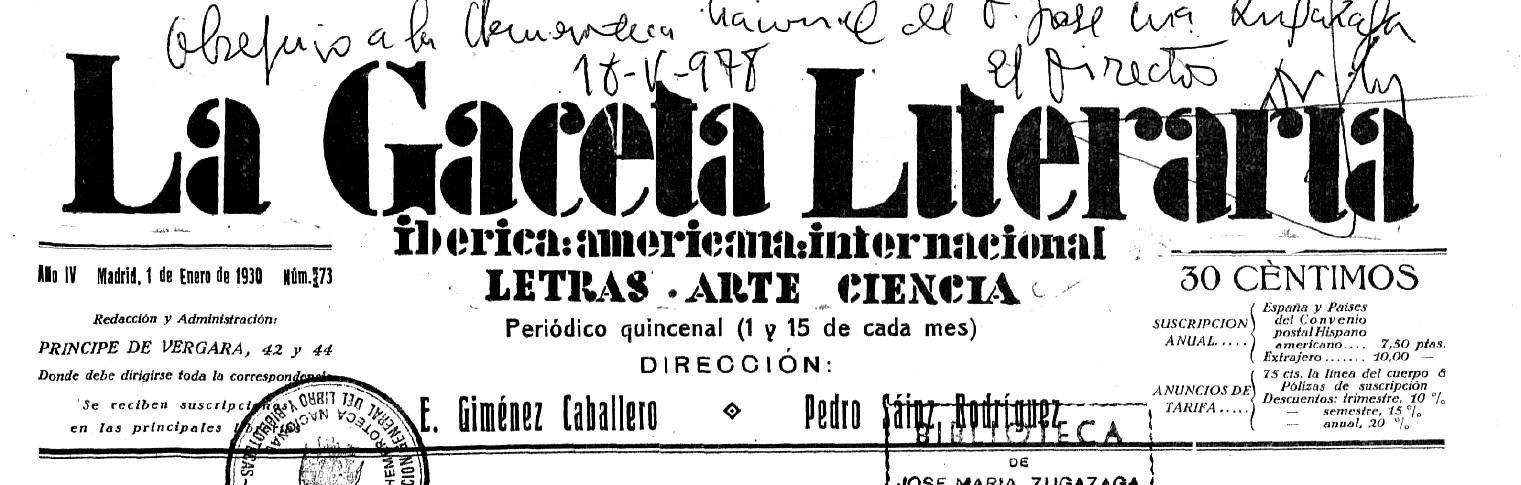
- Title page of the issue 73 dated 1930
- Categories: Literary magazine
- Frequency: Bimonthly
- Founder: Ernesto Giménez Caballero
- Founded: 1927
- First issue: January 1927
- Final issue: 1932
- Country: Spain
- Based in: Madrid
- Language: Spanish
- ISSN: 1575-7226
- OCLC: 1022088772

La Gaceta Literaria (Spanish: The Literary Gazetta) was a bimonthly avant-garde literary, arts and science magazine which appeared in Madrid, Spain, between 1927 and 1932. It is known for its leading contributors and editorial board members.

== History and profile ==
La Gaceta Literaria was started as a bimonthly publication in Madrid in 1927. Its founder and editor was Ernesto Giménez Caballero. Guillermo de Torre was the secretary of the editorial board, but left the magazine in August 1927 when he settled in Argentina. His successor was César Muñoz Arconada who assumed the post in 1929.

La Gaceta Literaria was open to all approaches in arts and had no a clear political stance at its start. However, from 1930 the magazine was redesigned in terms of its physical qualities becoming much smaller in size and its ideological stance adopting a clear Fascist stance. The same year it opened a debate on the meaning of avant-garde through a survey questionnaire asking its readers to answer the question "What is avant-garde?"

The editorial board of La Gaceta Literaria included the following: Ramón Gómez de la Serna, Antonio Marichalar, José Moreno Villa, José Bergamín, Antonio Espina, Melchor Fernández Almagro, Benjamín Jarnés, Fernando García Vela, Joaquín Garrigues and Francisco Guillén Salaya. Some of the leading contributors were Salvador Dalí, Rafael Sánchez Mazas, Federico García Lorca, Gerardo Diego, Dámaso Alonso, Rafael Alberti, Pedro Salinas, Vicente Aleixandre, Juan Aparicio López, Juan Piqueras Martínez, Jorge Guillén, Luis Buñuel, Eugenio Montes and Adriano del Valle. However, most of these figures left the magazine following the support of the Fascist views by Ernesto Giménez Caballero in 1930.

La Gaceta Literaria published a special issue on Italian futurism in 1928. Luis Buñuel was among the contributors of the magazine from the second issue dated January 1927 to April 1929 whose articles were about cinema. José Ortega y Gasset published an article entitled Sobre un periódico de las letras in the first issue of La Gaceta Literaria dated January 1927. Ramiro Ledesma Ramos was one of the regular contributors of the magazine which folded in 1932.

== See also ==
- List of avant-garde magazines
- List of magazines in Spain
