= The Videophile =

Video hobbyist magazine

- Cover of issue 29 (February 1981) of The Videophile
- Editor: Jim Lowe
- Frequency: Bimonthly
- Format: Newsletter (1976–1978, as The Videophile's Newsletter); Magazine (1978–1983, as The Videophile)
- Circulation: 8,000 (1981, peak)
- Publisher: Small Potatoes Publishing Company
- First issue: September 1976; 49 years ago (as The Videophile's Newsletter); 1979 (as The Videophile)
- Final issue: 1983

The Videophile was a bimonthly magazine targeted to enthusiasts and aficionados of home video taping and trading (so-dubbed videophiles) active from the mid-1970s to the mid-1980s. The magazine was established after the success of The Videophile's Newsletter, a newsletter oriented at enthusiasts of Sony's Betamax home video format. The Videophile's Newsletter was founded by Jim Lowe of Tallahassee, Florida, and ran from 1976 to 1978. The Videophile magazine ran from 1978 to 1983.

== History ==
=== As The Videophile's Newsletter (1976–1978) ===
The Videophile's Newsletter was founded in 1976 by Jim Lowe (born c. 1940), a collector and lawyer who had worked as the staff director at the Florida House of Representatives when he started the newsletter. Lowe established a start-up company, the Small Potatoes Publishing Company, out of his house in Tallahassee, Florida, to publish the newsletter. The inaugural issue of The Videophile's Newsletter, comprising four loose-leaf typewritten sheets, was published in September 1976. In his spare time before starting the newsletter, Lowe collected pop culture memorabilia, including fantasy art, comic books, motion pictures released on small-gauge film formats (such as 16 mm film), among other things. After purchasing a Sony Betamax VCR unit in 1975, Lowe became infatuated the brand-new home videotape format and placed an advertisement in Movie Collector's World inquiring about exchanging tapes of programs recorded off-air. Lowe delivered to all seven of his inquirers the inaugural issue of The Videophile's Newsletter, in which he outlined his goals for the newsletter: to act as a classified advertising service for Lowe and his subscribers requesting and providing for trade Betamax recordings of certain television programs and syndicated films (particularly rarer ones). Circulation of The Videophile's Newsletter quickly grew from seven to several hundred over the next few months.

The Videophile's Newsletter was published bi-monthly. Early issues were more homemade affairs, being typewritten by Howe himself and mimeographed onto loose-leaf paper sheets. Besides the classified pages of the newsletter, Lowe also wrote in editorials discussing methods and aspects in off-air television recording and new innovations and devices in the burgeoning field of home videotape. Readers would also submit and exchange technical knowledge of their VCR units either as points of trivia or in response to questions from Lowe and other readers. From the second issue onward, Lowe reserved a column for Joe Mazzini, an expert in Betamax as well as Sony's professional U-matic videotape format, that filled up the backpages of each issue. Lowe later hired a full-time technical editor, Marc Wielage, to write feature articles and reviews on the latest home video technology. Component-level diagrams of certain Betamax VCRs were also republished through The Videophile's Newsletter in terms of discussing how to modify certain aspects of these recorders to prevent unwanted behavior (particularly "muting", a feature of many VCRs of this era wherein strong-enough video signal dropouts resulted in the entire screen going blank) and allow multiple recorders to be wired together in order to achieve high-speed dubbing. The newsletter also disseminated the terminology and jargon of the television broadcasting world for readers to potentially improve the picture quality of their local stations by phone request; for example, by requesting the station cut the color burst on black-and-white programs to eliminate colorful "snow".

In the lead-up to the Supreme Court case Sony v. Universal, in winter 1977 Lowe was subpoenaed by Universal Pictures and Disney over his role in the off-air videotape trading scene. Lowe, and later Wielage, each gave depositions about their role in The Videophile's Newsletter and about videotaping in general, the transcripts for which were republished in the newsletter. Universal's attorneys considered the newsletter's culture of openness and transparency over information on how to efficiently tape television recordings disrespectful to the studios' intellectual property and cited the despositions as ammunition for their legal battle against Sony, seeking to prevent the Betamax from being able to make off-air recordings of the studio's feature films broadcast on national television. The U.S. Supreme Court ultimately ruled against Universal in 1984, declaring that off-air recordings of television programs for personal viewings constituted fair use.

=== As The Videophile (1979–1983) ===
The Videophile's Newsletter reached several thousand subscribers in mid-1978, helped along by features and namedrops in mainstream publications such as The Wall Street Journal, Money, and Playboy. Seeking to turn the newsletter into a polished magazine, Lowe appealed to his subscribers for money contributions in exchange for up-to-lifetime free subscriptions of the new magazine. This crowdfunding campaign was successful, and by late 1978 Lowe raised enough capital to lease an office for a full-time newsroom and to turn the newsletter into a glossy, professionally typeset magazine with studio-photographed covers. The first issue of The Videophile magazine was published in 1979.

If each of us will invest a small portion (no more than 2 percent) of our collections in certain examples of mundane, trashy and mostly worthless programming we may well find that in the distant future we alone will have been responsible for the preservation of some items which, in retrospect, may not seem to be as lacking in merit as we originally thought.

— Jim Lowe, publisher of The Videophile

Circulation of The Videophile peaked at 8,000 subscribers and was available at select newsstands nationwide. The magazine competed for the videophile (videotape hobbyist) market against publications such as Film Collector's World, Videoplay, Video Buyer's Guide, and Channels of Communication. The Springfield News-Sun editor David Scott called The Videophile the best out of all of them: "Sometimes, however, the most fascinating of these magazines never reach mass distribution. Circulated primarily by mail, they generally are not moneymakers but rather labors of love produced by the hobbyists themselves. The Videophile is the bimonthly baby of a Florida attorney and is in my opinion the best of periodicals." Journalist Guy MacMillin in 1980 described the newsletter as providing minimal advertising aside from the classifieds and the editorial sections as unafraid to "step on important industry toes in its articles, features, and product reports." Lowe reported in 1981 that the magazine did not generate considerable profit for his publishing house but broke even and expressed hope that he could raise more money by trading stock in the company in exchange for capital. He remained committed to hobby otherwise, recognizing it as a way of preserving the more obscure parts of television.

The year 1982 saw The Videophile faltering due to disputes with newsstand distributors and the cost of printing the magazine rising beyond what Lowe's company could afford, as well as a trademark dispute with another entity over the use of the word videophile in the magazine's title. Major-publisher competition such as Video and Videoplay meanwhile usurped potential new subscribers. In 1983, The Videophile abruptly folded.

== Videofax ==
After The Videophile folded in 1983, Wielage and Rod Woodcock established the newsletter Videofax in 1984, acquiring the Videophile subscriber list from Lowe and continuing for some years. Videofax represented a return to form, reestablishing the more technical tone and approach of The Videophile's Newsletter's early years.

== See also ==
- The Big Reel
