= Cantrills Filmnotes =

Film magazine in Australia (1971–2000)

- Editor: Arthur and Corinne Cantrill
- Categories: Film magazine
- Frequency: Bi-monthly (1971-1972); Quarterly (1973-1974); Biannual (1975-2000)
- Founder: Arthur and Corinne Cantrill
- First issue: March 1971
- Final issue Number: December 1999-January 2000; 93-100
- Country: Australia
- Based in: Melbourne
- Language: English
- ISSN: 0158-4154
- OCLC: 1255594837

Cantrills Filmnotes was a magazine about experimental films published in Melbourne, Australia, between 1971 and 2000.

== History and profile ==
Cantrills Filmnotes was founded and published by Arthur and Corinne Cantrill. The first issue of the magazine appeared on 19 March 1971. Its headquarters was in Melbourne. Arthur and Corinne Cantrill were editors of Cantrills Filmnotes.

The frequency of Cantrills Filmnotes varied: for the first two years it was published on a bi-monthly basis; from 1973 to 1974 it was published four times a year and from 1975 to 2000 it was published biannually. Its first issue appeared in the A4 format, but the remaining issues were printed in the 270x210mm format. The magazine was financed by the Australian Film Commission from October 1984 (issue #45/46) to December 1998 (issue #91/92).

Cantrills Filmnotes published the Manifesto of the Italian Futurists and Arthur and Corinne Cantrill's own manifesto on cinema in its inaugural issue. For the magazine the views of both Karl Marx and Sigmund Freud were not valid any more. The magazine mostly featured the reviews of experimental films or avant-garde films, video art and digital media. All the topics covered in the magazine were discussed from the artists' perspectives.

Cantrills Filmnotes ceased publication with the issue December 1999-January 2000 (#93-100) due to financial problems.

== See also ==
- List of film periodicals
