= Scott MacGillivray =

American non-fiction author (born 1957)

- Born: 1957 (age 68–69)
- Occupation: Writer
- Writing career
- Genre: Non-fiction

Scott MacGillivray (born 1957) is an American non-fiction author specializing in motion picture history.

His book Laurel & Hardy: From the Forties Forward, revised and expanded in 2009, chronicles the later films of Stan Laurel and Oliver Hardy, as well as their unproduced stage, screen, radio, and television productions, and the silent-comedy compilations of Robert Youngson. Some of MacGillivray's other books are The Soundies Book: A Revised and Expanded Guide (2007, co-authored with Ted Okuda), a history of the Soundies film musicals produced for coin-operated film jukeboxes in the 1940s; Gloria Jean: A Little Bit of Heaven (2005, co-authored with Jan MacGillivray), a biography of the popular singing star of the 1940s; and Castle Films: A Hobbyist's Guide (2004, foreword by Okuda), chronicling the 40-year history of the successful home-movie distributor. Ted Okuda and Scott MacGillivray have also collaborated on several magazine articles.

MacGillivray also writes for Wikipedia, and has researched some of its then under-represented entertainment subjects, including Educational Pictures, Olsen and Johnson, Shaw and Lee, Billy West, the Yacht Club Boys, Stoopnagle and Budd, Charles Starrett, Morgan Conway, Robert Q. Lewis, The Chamber Music Society of Lower Basin Street, the Hoosier Hot Shots, Monogram Pictures, Producers Releasing Corporation, The Bowery Boys, Screen Snapshots, and Cinecolor.

MacGillivray has been the chairman of the Boston chapter of the international Laurel and Hardy society The Sons of the Desert since 1977, and is the longest-tenured chairman in the organization. His commentaries appear on Eureka Entertainment's 2025 DVD set Laurel & Hardy: The Silent Years, 1928 and 20th Century-Fox's DVD releases of the Laurel & Hardy features The Dancing Masters, The Bullfighters, and A-Haunting We Will Go.
