= Objetivo =

Spanish film magazine (1953–1955)

- Categories: Film magazine
- Founder: Luis Garcia Berlanga; Juan Antonio Bardem
- Founded: 1953
- First issue: July 1953
- Final issue: September–October 1955
- Country: Spain
- Based in: Madrid
- Language: Spanish

Objetivo was a film magazine published between 1953 and 1955 in Madrid, Spain. The magazine was one of the significant publications, which contributed to the struggle for a censorship-free cinema in Francoist Spain. Spanish author Marvin D'Lugo argues that the magazine was very influential during its lifetime despite its short existence and lower levels of circulation.

== History and profile ==
Objetivo was founded in 1953. Based in Madrid, the first issue of the magazine appeared in July 1953. Objetivo was modeled on Italian film magazine Cinema Nuovo. The founders were Luis Garcia Berlanga and Juan Antonio Bardem. They were both influenced from Italian neorealism. The financier of the magazine which was linked to the illegal Communist Party was José Ángel Ezcurra, who owned a cultural and political magazine entitled Triunfo.

Objetivo did not conform to Franco's cultural politics. The magazine adopted a social realist approach, which was concerned with the highest ideal of cinema. It mostly featured articles about the Italian neorealism. It did not covered Hollywood films, but contained articles on independent American films. Eduardo Ducay published film critics in Objetivo. The other significant contributors included Ricardo Muñoz Suay and Paulino Garagorri. The magazine folded after the publication of the September-October 1955 issue due to the crackdown of the Francoist State. Most of its contributors were arrested following the closure of the magazine. During its lifetime Objetivo produced just nine issues.

== See also ==
- List of film periodicals
