= F. Maurice Speed =

English film critic (1911–1998)

F. Maurice Speed (1911–1998) was an English film critic who created two innovative and long-lasting publications: the listings magazine What's On in London, which ran from 1935 until 2007, and later the Film Review annual, which began in 1944 and ended in 2015.

== Life and career ==
Born in London on 18 October 1911, Frederick Maurice Speed began a lifelong devotion to filmgoing in the small cinemas around Hammersmith. According to a potted biography published in 1991, he began his working life as an apprentice on the Harrow Observer.

=== What's On ===
Having been an assistant to Edward Martell, proprietor of The Sunday Referee, it was to Martell that Speed turned when he had the idea to set up the listings magazine What's On in London. First published in September 1935, What's On was edited (and almost entirely written) by Speed, who titled his editorials 'Round and About'.

According to Denis Gifford in his Speed obituary for The Independent, "During Coronation Year of 1937 Speed realised the vast appeal that George VI's coronation would have for visitors from abroad. 'Indispensable to Visitors' became the front-page subtitle from then on, replacing the original and less catchy 'Complete Arrangements for the London Week'."

Among Speed's earliest What's On pseudonyms were J. Lilywhite Haffner (for book reviews) and Frederick Deeps; he was still using the latter for shorter critiques in his Film Review annuals in the 1990s. He made his last contribution to the magazine in 1996, while What’s On itself outlived its creator by nine years, eventually folding in 2007.

=== Film Review ===
Speed's second innovative concept was based on his conviction that "What the ordinary moviegoer lacks is a more or less complete annual record, in picture and story, of his year's filmgoing. Ironically enough, it wasn't until the war came along, and I had been discharged from the Army, that I decided, as nobody else seemed so inclined, I might as well attempt to fill the void myself."

The idea came to fruition in 1944 as Film Review. As Speed recalled in the annual's 50th edition, "That initial 1944-45 book sold some 80,000 copies to a book-starved public and the second annual reached a dizzy 250,000 print order." The book rapidly developed into an annual illustrated digest of all the films screened in the UK. As time went on, Speed gathered together more and more outside contributors, among them Peter Noble, William K. Everson, Oswell Blakeston, Peter Cowie, Anthony Slide, Ivan Butler and Gordon Gow, as well as soliciting special articles by such film industry figures as James Mason, Michael Balcon, Cecil B. De Mille, Jean Kent, Rita Hayworth and Alfred Hitchcock. He also showed a keen interest in technical advances such as stereo sound and CinemaScope.

In 1963, for the 20th edition, Speed's publishers, Macdonald & Co, altered the annual's format, reducing it in size and doubling the price. This new look only lasted for three years, after which Macdonald dropped the title. After a 12-month hiatus, Speed returned, now under the aegis of W.H. Allen, with a catch-up edition (published at the end of 1967) that covered a two-year period.

In 1987 Speed, by then in his seventies, took on co-editor James Cameron-Wilson, who would eventually graduate to editing the book on his own before handing over to Michael Darvell and Mansel Stimpson in 2007. The annual was published in latter years by Columbus Books, Virgin Books, Reynolds & Hearn and, starting in 2011, Signum Books.

After the 70th edition appeared on 2 November 2015, the annual made the move to digital the following month, relaunching as the website Film Review Daily. Edited by Cameron-Wilson, the digital edition features regular contributions from Stimpson, Darvell, George Savvides and Chad Kennerk.

=== Other work ===
Speed's work was by no means confined to What's On and Film Review. His first book, Movie Cavalcade: The Story of the Cinema – Its Stars, Studios and Producers, was published in 1943 and boasted a foreword by Bob Hope. Three years later he published The Londoner Annual as a spin-off from What's On, but this venture failed to initiate a series as Film Review had done. He edited The Western Film Annual from 1950 to 1956, then the retitled Western Film and TV Annual until 1962. With Cameron-Wilson, he also devised The Moviegoer’s Quiz Book in 1985.

=== Recognition ===
In March 1991 Speed was honoured by the London Film Critics' Circle. "I was considerably moved," he wrote in that year's Film Review annual, "when, at a little ceremony at the Ritz Hotel in London, my fellow critics saw fit to present me with a special award for long service to the film industry. That award, now facing me as I write this, is something I shall always treasure."

Twice married, F. Maurice Speed died in London on 29 August 1998.
