= César Muñoz Arconada =

Spanish writer, poet and journalist

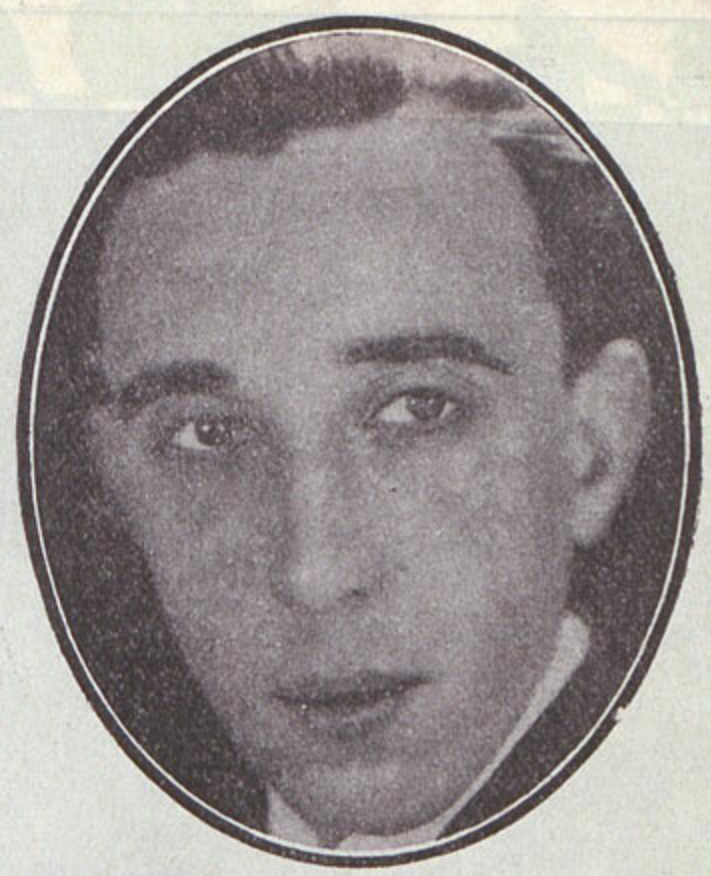
- César M. Arconada (1929)
- Born: 5 December 1898; Astudillo, Palencia, Spain
- Died: 10 March 1964 (aged 65); Moscow, Soviet Union
- Occupations: Writer, journalist, translator
- Notable work: La turbina, Los pobres contra los ricos, Río Tajo
- Movement: Generation of '27, Socialist realism
- Spouse: María Cánovas Zamorano (1952-1964)

César Muñoz Arconada (5 December 1898 – 10 March 1964), who signed his work as César M. Arconada, was a Spanish writer, poet, journalist and translator.

== Early life ==
He was the eldest son of Ángel Muñoz Nava and his wife Ángela Arconada Blanco. Arconada's father was a journalist and a post official. From January 1920 to March 1923, he often collaborated in Diario Palentino, and from 1923 in Alfar de Coruña.

Arconada became a critic of music and cinema and wrote poetry alongside, where he already leaned towards social concerns, more frequent in his future writing. He became editor-in-chief of the magazine La Gaceta Literaria in 1927, the main medium of the Generation of '27, where his collaboration (until January 1931) was frequent and outstanding.

== Second Republic ==
In 1931 he joined the Spanish Communist Party and is active in the social-realist trend in Spain. He collaborated, Nueva Cultura, Leviatán, Frente Literario and Mundo Obrero and Octubre, which he co-edited with Rafael Alberti. He published two novels within the framework of the so-called socialist realism: namely Los pobres contra los ricos and Reparto de tierras (1934); in both he showed the situation of the Spanish countryside in a period of revolutionary peak. In 1938 he wrote another novel, Río Tajo, which received the National Prize for Literature, but which would only be published in Moscow in 1970 and in Spain in 1978, in which he praised the Popular Front during the Spanish Civil War.

== Exile and later life ==
Upon the defeat of the Second Spanish Republic in 1939, he went into exile in Moscow. There he became an enthusiastic promoter of Spanish literature, mainly of the Spanish Golden Age, as with Cervantes' La gitanilla, which he adapted and succeeded in the Gypsy Theater of Moscow. He was director of the Spanish-language edition of the Soviet Literary magazine and was connected to the Publishing Progress of Foreign Languages. He wrote a minor play Manuela Sánchez (se puso en escena en algún teatro y fue transmitida en fragmentos por Radio Moscú). The Great Soviet Encyclopedia noted that he was influenced by Russian writers such as Maxim Gorky, Konstantin Fedin and others. He translated into Spanish, with Fyodor Keljin, the work Talk about the soldier Igor and a series of poems by Alexander Pushkin, Mikhail Lermontov and Nikolai Nekrasov. He also wrote two collections of short stories, namely España es invencible (1941) and Cuentos de Madrid (1942), some plays and the extended praise poem Dolores (1945).

He married a exile María Cánovas Zamorano (1915–1987), from Cartagena raised in the Balearic Islands, bilingual and inclined to poetry, which made her a very suitable collaborator for Arconada. She was, exwife the military officer Marcelino Usatorre, and mother of Juan Usatorre.

== Works ==
Poetry

- Urbe. Málaga, Imprenta Sur, 1928.
- Vivimos en una noche oscura. París/Madrid, Publicaciones Izquierda, 1936, 92 pp.
- Romances de la guerra. Santander, Ediciones Unidad, 1937, 75 pp.
- Multaj poeziaĵoj dise en gazetoj ĉefe de Sovetunio.

Essays non-narrative prose

- En torno a Debussy. Madrid, Espasa-Calpe, 1926, 264 pp.
- Vida de Greta Garbo. Madrid, Ediciones Ulises, 1929, 256 pp. Madrid, Castellote Editor, 1974.
- Tres cómicos del cine. Madrid, Ediciones Ulises, 1931, 288 pp. Madrid, Miguel Castellote, 1974, 344 pp. Nigel Dennis kaj Francisco Soguero: Sevilla, Renacimiento, Col. Biblioteca del Rescate, 2007, 373 pp.

Narrative prose

- La turbina. Madrid, Ediciones Ulises, 1930. Madrid, Turner, 1975, La novela social española, kun prologo de Gonzalo Santonja.
- «La humildad», en Las siete virtudes. Madrid, Espasa-Calpe, 1931.
- Los pobres contra los ricos. París / Madrid, Publicaciones de Izquierda, 1933, 286 pp. La Habana, Editorial Arte y Literatura, 1977, 314 pp.
- Reparto de tierras. París / Madrid, Publicaciones de Izquierda, 1934, 223 pp. Diputación Provincial de Badajoz, 1987, kun prologo de Gregorio Torres Nebrera.
- «Xuan el músico». En la revuo Ayuda, num. 8-9 (1936), kaj en Los novelistas sociales españoles (1928-1936). Antología, de Gonzalo Santonja kaj José Esteban, Barcelona, Anthropos.
- Río Tajo [1938]. Madrid, Akal, 1978, kun prologo de Juan Antonio Hormigón, 337 pp. (Antaŭe, en 1964, estis aperinta tradukaĵo al ĉeĥa Řeka Tajo, Praha / Státní nakladatelství krásné literatury a umění).
- Cuentos de Madrid. Natalia Kharitónova, Sevilla, Renacimiento, Col. Biblioteca del exilio, 2007, 229 pp.

Theatre

- Tres farsas para títeres. París/Madrid, Publicaciones Izquierda, 1936. («El teniente Cazadotes», «Dios y la beata» kaj «Gran baile en La Concordia»).
- La conquista de Madrid, 1937.
- Nueva Carmen. Moskvo en la num. 7 (1944) de la revuo Literatura Internacional. En Hispanio, en la revuo Renacimiento, num. 27-30 (2000), en eldono de Natalia Kharitónova.
- Teatro español en la escuela. Kunlabore kun Josefa Gómez-Ganivet. Moscú, Uchpedguiz, 1953, 74 pp. (Mamita Clara, Al Congreso de los Pueblos por la Paz, Viena, Andrés, Don Generoso de lo ajeno kaj El Lazarillo).

Translation

- El viento del Este. De S. Zeromski; Madrid: Ulises, 1931 (el pola fare de Mauricio Amster kaj C. M. Arconada).

Compilation

- Obras escogidas. Tomo I: Los pobres contra los ricos kaj Reparto de tierras. Tomo II: Río Tajo. Moscú, Ediciones Progreso, 1969, kun prologo de Inna Tiniánova.
- La Guerra de Asturias (Crónicas y romances). Gonzalo Santonja. Madrid, Ayuso, 1979, 127 pp.
- De Astudillo a Moscú. Obra periodística. Christopher H. Cobb. Valladolid, Ámbito, 1986, 359 pp.

Not published

- José Díaz. Biography
- Manuela Sánchez.
- Andanzas por la nueva China. Journalism
- España invencible. Narrative.
- ¡Heroicas mujeres de España!.
