= El Sol (Madrid) =

Spanish newspaper

- Type: Daily newspaper
- Founded: 1 December 1917
- Ceased publication: 1939
- Language: Spanish
- Headquarters: Madrid

El Sol (meaning "the Sun" in English) was a Spanish newspaper published in Madrid, Spain, between 1917 and 1939.

== History and profile ==
El Sol was first published on 1 December 1917 by Nicolás María de Urgoiti. Edited by Manuel Aznar Zubigaray, its writers included Julio Álvarez del Vayo and Ernesto Giménez Caballero. The paper had its headquarters in Madrid.

El Sol ceased publication in early 1939, after the Falange forces of Francisco Franco captured Madrid, and the newspaper's facilities were taken over by the Falange newspaper Arriba.
