= Guido Aristarco =

Italian film critic and author (1918–1996)

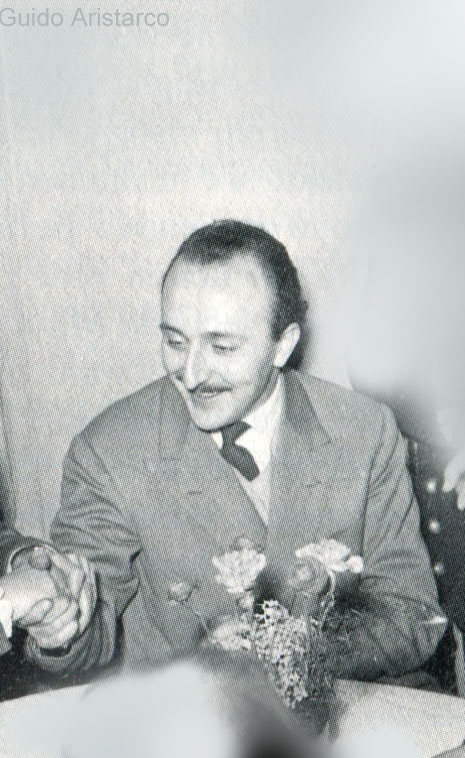
- Born: 7 October 1918; Fossacesia, Italy
- Died: 11 September 1996 (aged 77); Rome, Italy
- Occupation: Film critic

Guido Aristarco (7 October 1918 – 11 September 1996) was an Italian film critic and author.

== Biography ==
Born in Fossacesia, Chieti, at very young age Aristarco debuted as a film critic for the newspapers La Gazzetta di Mantova and Il Corriere Padano and then for the magazine Cinema.

A dean of the Marxist film criticism, influenced by the thought of Antonio Gramsci and György Lukács, for whom he wrote the preface of The Destruction of Reason, in 1952 he founded and edited (until his death) the film magazine Cinema Nuovo. He was also the first university professor of cinema in Italy, first in Turin and later in Rome.

Aristarco was a jury member of the Venice Film Festival three times, in 1948, 1963, and 1985.
