= Arthur and Corinne Cantrill =

Australian filmmakers (1938–2026 and 1928–2025)

- Born: 6 November 1928 (Corinne), 1938 (Arthur)
- Died: 18 February 2025 (aged 96) (Corinne) 24 September 2026 (aged 88) (Arthur)
- Occupations: Filmmakers, academics, composers and authors
- Known for: Work in children's educational film, experimental 16mm shorts, multiple projection films, feature length experimental film, kinetic film and performance film

Arthur Cantrill, AM (1938 – 24 September 2026) and Corinne Mozelle Cantrill, AM (6 November 1928 – 18 February 2025) were Australian filmmakers, academics, composers and authors based in Castlemaine, Victoria. They have worked in children's educational film, experimental 16mm shorts, multiple projection films, feature length experimental film, kinetic film and performance film, which they labelled 'expanded cinema'.

== Careers ==
They edited and published 100 issues of the experimental film journal Cantrills Filmnotes between 1971 and 2000.

The Cantrills' films have been exhibited and featured at the Centre Pompidou, The Louvre, the Museum of Modern Art, the National Gallery of Australia, Berlin Film Festival, Melbourne Film Festival, Cinéma du Réel, Melbourne Super 8 Festival, Brisbane International Film Festival, Buenos Aires Independent Film Festival, Thessaloniki International Film Festival. BBC Television 1 featured one of their short films during their residence in London in the late 1960s. Their work in children's educational film were broadcast on ABC Television between 1960 and 1963.

Arthur Cantrill was Associate Professor in the School of Creative Arts at the University of Melbourne until his retirement in 1996.

Their 1970 biographical film, Harry Hooton, focused on Australian anarchist, Wobbly and member of the Sydney Push. Corinne Cantrill's 1984 autobiographical film In this life's body was named by Greek-Australian film-maker Bill Mousoulis as one of the fifty greatest independent films in Australian history.

In 2010, Melbourne based Shame File Music released a compilation of Arthur Cantrill's compositions, titled Chromatic Mysteries: soundtracks 1963-2009. In 2014, Shame File Music released Hootonics, Arthur Cantrill's soundtrack for Harry Hooton on vinyl. In 2011, their work was the focus of a retrospective exhibition at Australian Centre for the Moving Image, titled Light Years.

== Later life and death ==
Corinne Cantrill died on 18 February 2025, at the age of 96, while Arthur Cantrill died on 24 September 2026, at the age of 88.

== Awards and honours ==
In 2011, Arthur and Corinne Cantrill were awarded Membership of the Order of Australia (AM) 'for service to the visual arts as a documentary and experimental film maker, and to education in the creative arts fields, particularly surrealism and avant-garde cinema'.

== Selected filmography ==
- Henri Gaudier-Brzeska, 30 mins, 1968 (16mm)
- Bouddi, 8 mins, 1970, (16mm)
- 4000 Frames, An Eye-Opener Film, 3 mins, 1970, (16mm)
- Harry Hooton, 83 mins, 1970, (16mm)
- Calligraphy Contest for the New Year, 1971 (expanded cinema performance)
- Concert for Electric Jugs, 1971 (expanded cinema performance)
- Blast, 6 mins, 1971, (16mm)
- Gold Fugue, 3 mins, 1971 (3 screen film)
- Pink Metronome, 3 mins, 1971 (3 screen film)
- Room, 5 mins, 1971 (3 screen film)
- The City, 8 mins, 1971 (3 screen film)
- Fragments, 13 mins, 1971 (3 screen film)
- Skin of Your Eye, 117 mins, 1973 (16mm)
- At Eltham, 24 mins, 1974 (16mm)
- Reflections on Three Images by Baldwin Spencer, 1901, 17 mins, 1974 (16mm)
- Three Colour Separation Studies - Landscapes, 13 mins, 1976 (3-colour separation film)
- Three Colour Separation Studies - Still Lifes, 13 mins, 1976 (3-colour separation film)
- Edges of Meaning, 1977 (multi-screen expanded cinema performance)
- In This Life's Body, 147 mins, 1984 (16mm)
- Rainbow Diary, 17 mins, 1984 (with Ivor Cantrill) (16mm)
- Notes on Berlin, the Divided City, 30 mins, Super 8mm (16mm enlargement), 1986
- Walking Track, 20 mins, Super 8mm, 1987 (16mm)
- The Berlin Apartment, 120 mins, 1987/1992 (2-screen film)
- Projected Light, 120mins, 1988 (multi-screen, mixed media expanded cinema)
- The Bemused Tourist, 120mins, 1997 (three screen mixed media expanded cinema)
- Ivor Paints Arf Arf, 5 mins, 28 secs, 1998 (3-colour separation film)
- The City of Chromatic Dissolution, 21 mins, 35 secs, 1998 (3-colour separation film)
- The City of Chromatic Intensity, 5 mins, 1999 (3-colour separation film)
- The Room of Chromatic Mystery, 7 mins, 2006 (16mm)
