= Film Review (annual) =

Film annual by F. Maurice Speed

Film Review (or The Film Review annual) was a yearly British publication founded in 1944 by the English film critic F. Maurice Speed.

The "world's longest running film book", each annual volume covered a year in cinema. In addition to the year's film releases, the annual included pictures, articles, and regular features, including 'The Year in Cinema', 'Releases of the Year in Pictures', 'Rising Stars', 'Looking Forward', and 'The Year in Disneyland'. Contributing authors included Alfred Hitchcock, Audrey Hepburn, Alan Ladd, Betty Grable, Bing Crosby, Cecil B. DeMille, Doris Day, James Mason, John Mills, John Wayne, Rita Hayworth, and Walt Disney.

In 2015, the Cinema Museum (London) celebrated the history of the annual and the final published edition. After 70 issues of the movie almanac, Film Review moved to a digital format.

== Links ==
- Official Website:
