= The Big Reel =

Film collector magazine

- September 1982 cover
- Editor: Rhonda Lemons
- Former editors: Don Key
- Circulation: 4,800 (late 1980s, peak)
- Publisher: House of Stars; Empire Publishing; F+W Publications
- First issue: April 1974; 51 years ago
- Final issue Number: October 2008; 400
- ISSN: 0744-723X

The Big Reel was an American magazine dedicated to collectors of film and television material—particularly prints and tapes, but also props, stills, and other memorabilia. The magazine was published by Donald R. "Don" Key (July 18, 1937 – June 26, 2018) of Madison, North Carolina, who founded it in 1974. The magazine initially delivered monthly, later bi-monthly.

== 1974–1990: Founding and success ==
Madison native Don Key founded the Big Reel in April 1974. At age 35, Key had no prior experience in the publishing industry, having only owned a carpet cleaning business, as well as having been a salesman of cars and mobile homes. Key owed his interest in starting a publication dedicated to film collecting to his appetite for cinema-going—estimating that he had watched over 5,000 films as of 1993, including those that screened while he served the United States Navy during the 1950s. For three years in the Navy, Key watched a different film for every day. Starting in the late 1960s, Key would attend gatherings hosted by local film collector Milo Holt, who concentrated on Western films. At the beginning, the attendees of these gatherings were a close-knit group of other film collectors, including Key. In 1972, however, the base of collectors had grown to where Holt decided to host a cruise along the Mississippi River, on which he invited big-name Western stars such as Sunset Carson, Lash LaRue, and Tex Ritter. Key conceived of the Big Reel on this cruise and discussed it among the attendees to great interest. The magazine was an immediate success following its first issue. Available only through mail order at first, major newsstands eventually equipped it.

The Big Reel is an excellent means by which a researcher can tap into the huge collector trade, where most of today's extant television programming can be found. Indeed, with increasing frequency researchers themselves advertise in its pages, announcing what titles they need in the hope that some collector might have that rare print or kinescope, and be willing to part with it (for a price) or, more advantageous, supply a videotape of it.

— William Lafferty, in Private Screenings: Television and the Female Consumer

At its peak in the 1980s, the Big Reel reached 4,800 subscriptions, with some academics considering this figure to comprise near the total amount of collectors in the United States during that time. The non-editorial portions of the magazine comprised hundreds of advertisements for prints and tapes of film and television material, as well as props, stills, and other memorabilia. The number of titles advertised in each issue spanned thousands.

Among its targeted collectors, The Big Reel was seen as a bible, through which to purchase prints of films not yet transferred to tape by the original distributor, to valuate memorabilia, and to discover films and television programs thought partially or entirely lost—this latter function being the source of many scams. Besides its use for collectors, researchers and academics of film studies also used The Big Reel as a directory through which to contact collectors for copies of obscure films or television programs, sometimes even taking advertisements themselves seeking rare titles. The magazine helped catapult the professional careers of several multinational film distributors, including Jeff Joseph of SabuCat and Mike Vraney of Something Weird.

Rival publications included Classic Images, Movie Collectors World, VideoMania, The Videophile, and Screen Thrills—the latter of which was also published in North Carolina, in Raleigh. The editor of Screen Thrills, Jerry Burke called the Big Reel the "best adzine on the market for film collectors" over his own.

== 1990–2008: Sale and decline ==
Key incorporated House of Stars to publish The Big Reel in the early 1990s. In 1993, he employed six people to write the magazine, including himself and his UNCG graduate daughter Rhonda Lemons, to whom Key relinquished his editing rights. Around this time, House of Stars also introduced a sister publication, Hollywood and Vine, and started publishing picture books and reference works on the film industry. Later in 1993, during a perceived decline of film collecting as a lucrative business, Key sold the rights to the Big Reel to Empire Publishing, a big publishing house. Empire struggled with the Big Reel in the years following. Although the Big Reel saw use by collectors for the exchange of reportedly thousands of films in the months leading to its closure, the magazine ended in October 2008, folding into Antique Trader. The publisher of the aforementioned magazine, F+W Publications, had bought The Big Reel from Empire several years back.

== Legal troubles ==
The legality of the copies of film and television programs advertised in the Big Reel varied: some vendors were movie theaters unloading old films that were sold to them by the distributor, while others were selling pirated copies. From the earliest days of the Big Reel, the Federal Bureau of Investigation frequently perused the magazine in search of collections of potentially pirated materials. According to Key, major film studios funded the FBI with upwards of US$25 million in the mid-1970s in exchange for an increase in the crackdown on pirated films. Because of this, after the magazine's closure, Key dubbed film collecting the most dangerous hobby in the world. In the early 1980s, the FBI subpoenaed Key to testify against a collector who was charged with selling pirated films, using the Big Reel to advertise their inventory. Key refused to answer questions during his deposition, and a federal court later fined Key USD$1800 for contempt of court. The FBI's interest in the Big Reel subsided following the magazine's peak in the late 1980s.

== Legacy ==
The film historian William C. Cline wrote a lauded column in the Big Reel entitled "Serials-ly Speaking", the first entries into which consisted of brief commentaries on some aspect of a given serial film. These columns later expanded in length and subject matter and introduced counterpoints from letters, callers and personal correspondence with Cline in film festivals and collector conventions. A collection of these columns were later compiled in the book Serials-ly Speaking: Essays on Cliffhangers, published by McFarland & Company in 1994.
