= List of Spaniards =

This list, in alphabetical order within categories, of notable hispanic people of Spanish heritage and descent born and raised in Spain, or of direct Spanish descent.

Note: The same person may appear under several headings.

Reino de España (Spanish)

| (Flag of Spain) | (Coat of Arms of Spain) |

== Actors ==
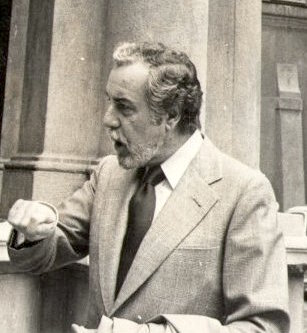
Fernando Rey

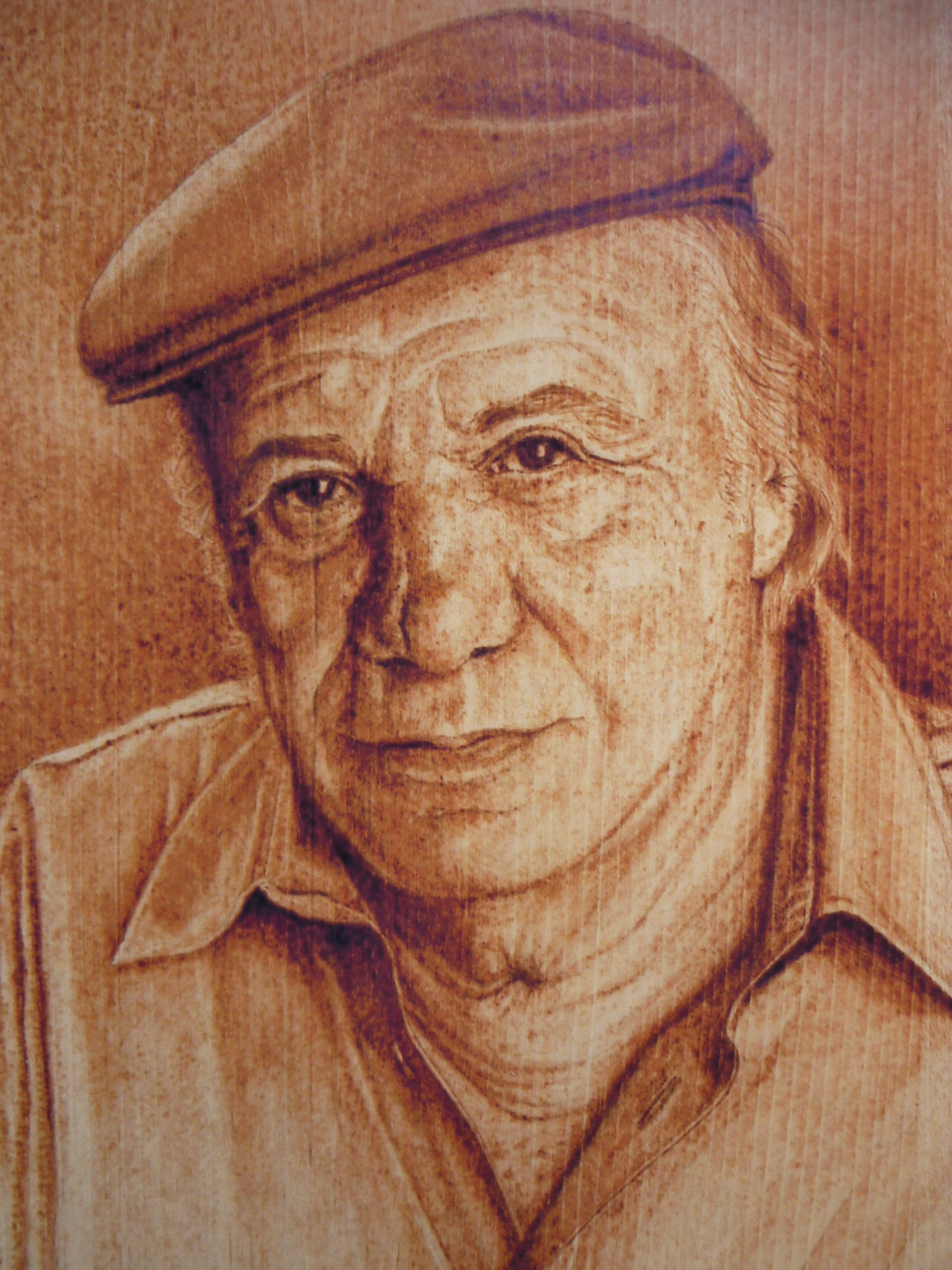
Francisco Rabal

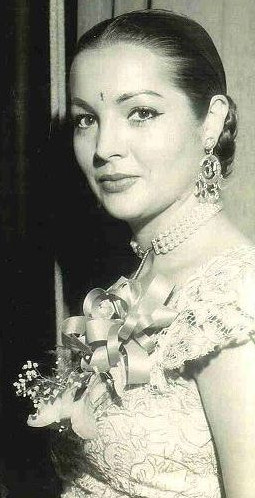
Sara Montiel

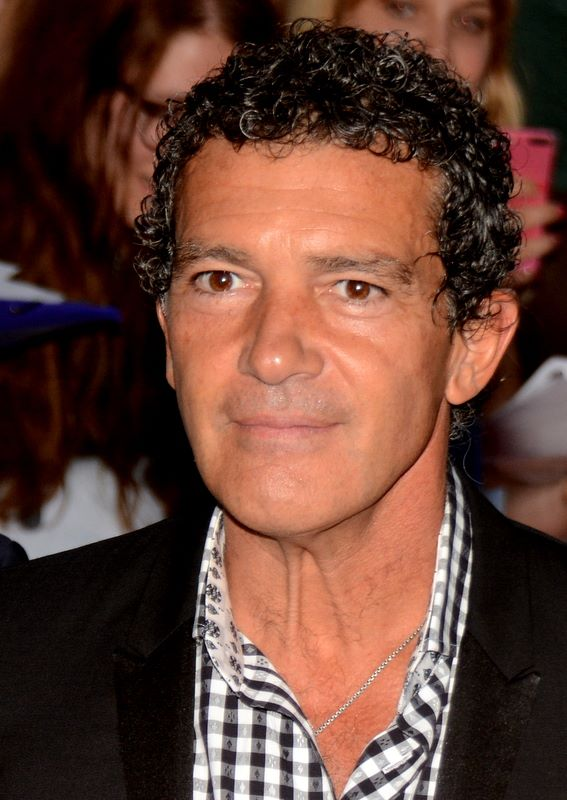
Antonio Banderas

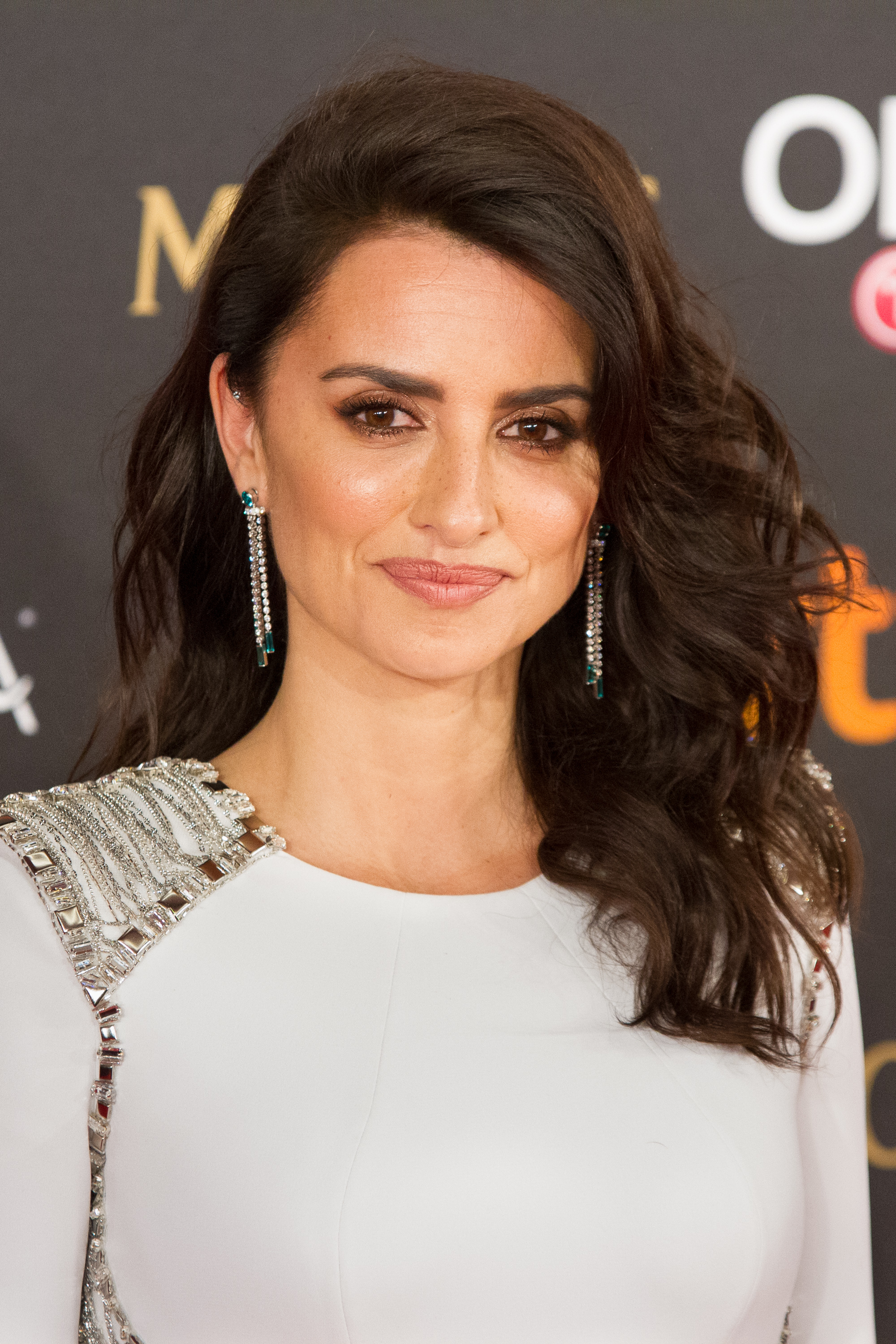
Penélope Cruz

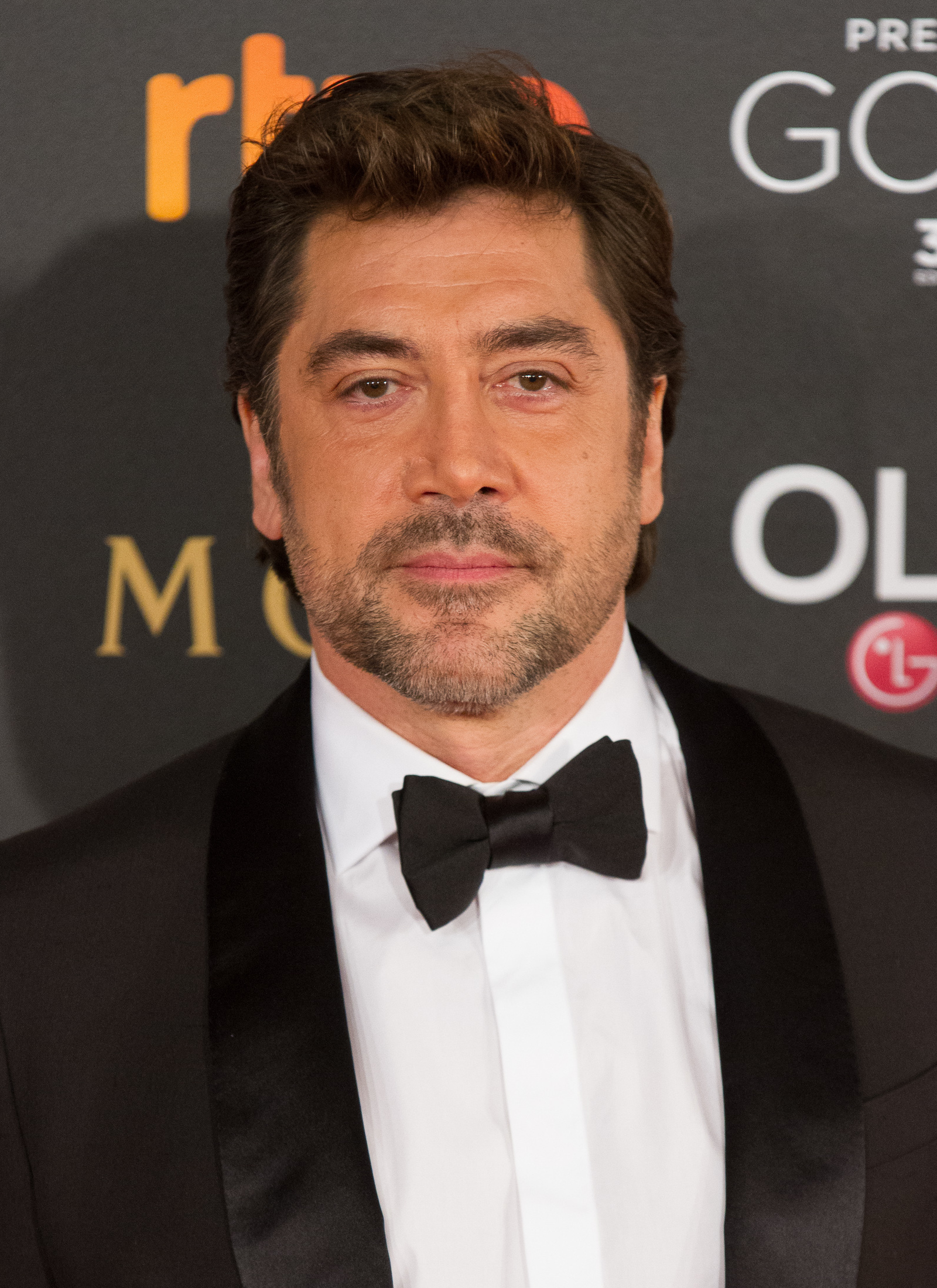
Javier Bardem

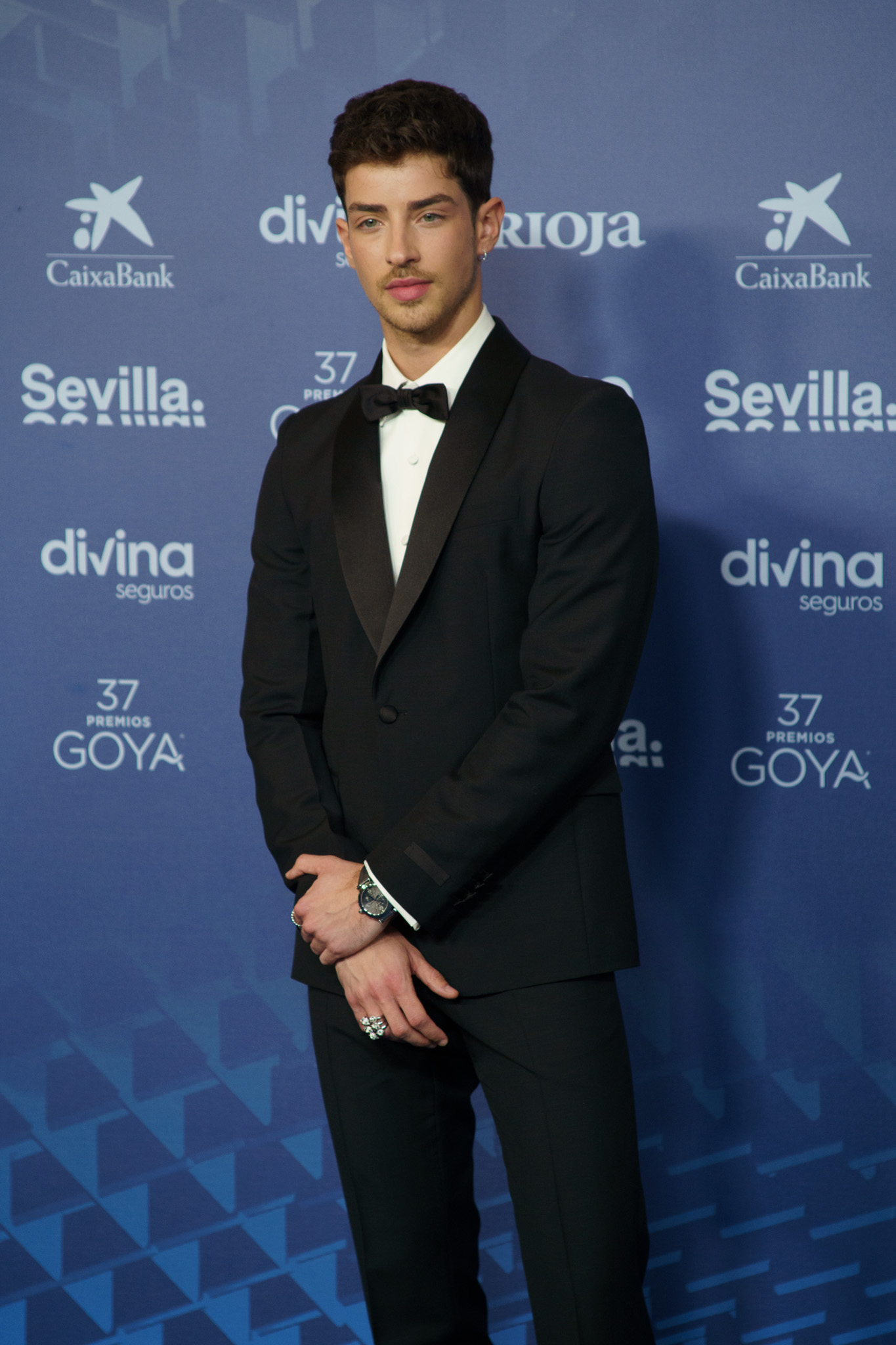
Manu Ríos

- Victoria Abril (born 1957)
- Georgina Amorós (born 1998)
- Elena Anaya (born 1975)
- Antonio Banderas (born 1960)
- Javier Bardem (born 1969)
- Pilar Bardem (1939–2021)
- Amparo Baró (1937–2015)
- Claudia Bassols (born 1979)
- Ana Belén (born 1951)
- Àstrid Bergès-Frisbey (born 1986)
- Miguel Bernardeau (born 1996)
- Juan Diego Botto (born 1975)
- Mario Casas (born 1986)
- Javier Cámara (born 1967)
- Inma Cuesta (born 1980)
- Mark Consuelos (born 1970)
- Úrsula Corberó (born 1989)
- Penélope Cruz (born 1974)
- Ana de Armas (born 1988)
- Carla Díaz (born 1998)
- Gabino Diego (born 1966)
- Lola Dueñas (1908–1983)
- Andrea Duro (born 1991)
- Paula Echevarría (born 1977)
- Itzan Escamilla (born 1997)
- Ester Expósito (born 2000)
- Angelines Fernández (1922–1994)
- Angy Fernández (born 1990)
- Bibiana Fernández (born 1954)
- Fernando Fernán Gómez (1921–2007)
- Alba Flores (born 1986)
- Elena Furiase (born 1988)
- Juan Luis Galiardo (1940–2012)
- Macarena García (born 1988)
- Sancho Gracia (1936–2012)
- Chus Lampreave (1930–2016)
- Alfredo Landa (1933–2013)
- Sergi López (actor) (born 1965)
- José Luis López Vázquez (1922–2009)
- Iván Massagué (born 1976)
- Carmen Maura (born 1945)
- Ana Milán (born 1973)
- Jordi Mollà (born 1968)
- Lina Morgan (1936–2015)
- Irene Montalà (born 1976)
- Sara Montiel (1928–2013)
- Abril Montilla Parra (born 2000)
- Paul Naschy (1934–2009)
- Najwa Nimri (born 1972)
- Eduardo Noriega (born 1973)
- Elsa Pataky (born 1976)
- María Pedraza (born 1996)
- Lucía Ramos (born 1991)
- Fernando Rey (1917–1994)
- Manu Ríos (born 1998)
- Blanca Romero (born 1976)
- Sara Sálamo (born 1992)
- Claudia Salas (born 1994)
- Marina Salas (born 1988)
- Fernando Sancho (1916–1990)
- Santiago Segura (born 1965)
- Miguel Ángel Silvestre (born 1982)
- Blanca Suárez (born 1988)
- Luis Tosar (born 1971)
- María Valverde (born 1986)
- Concha Velasco (1939–2023)
- Paz Vega (born 1976)
- Maribel Verdú (born 1970)

== Artists ==
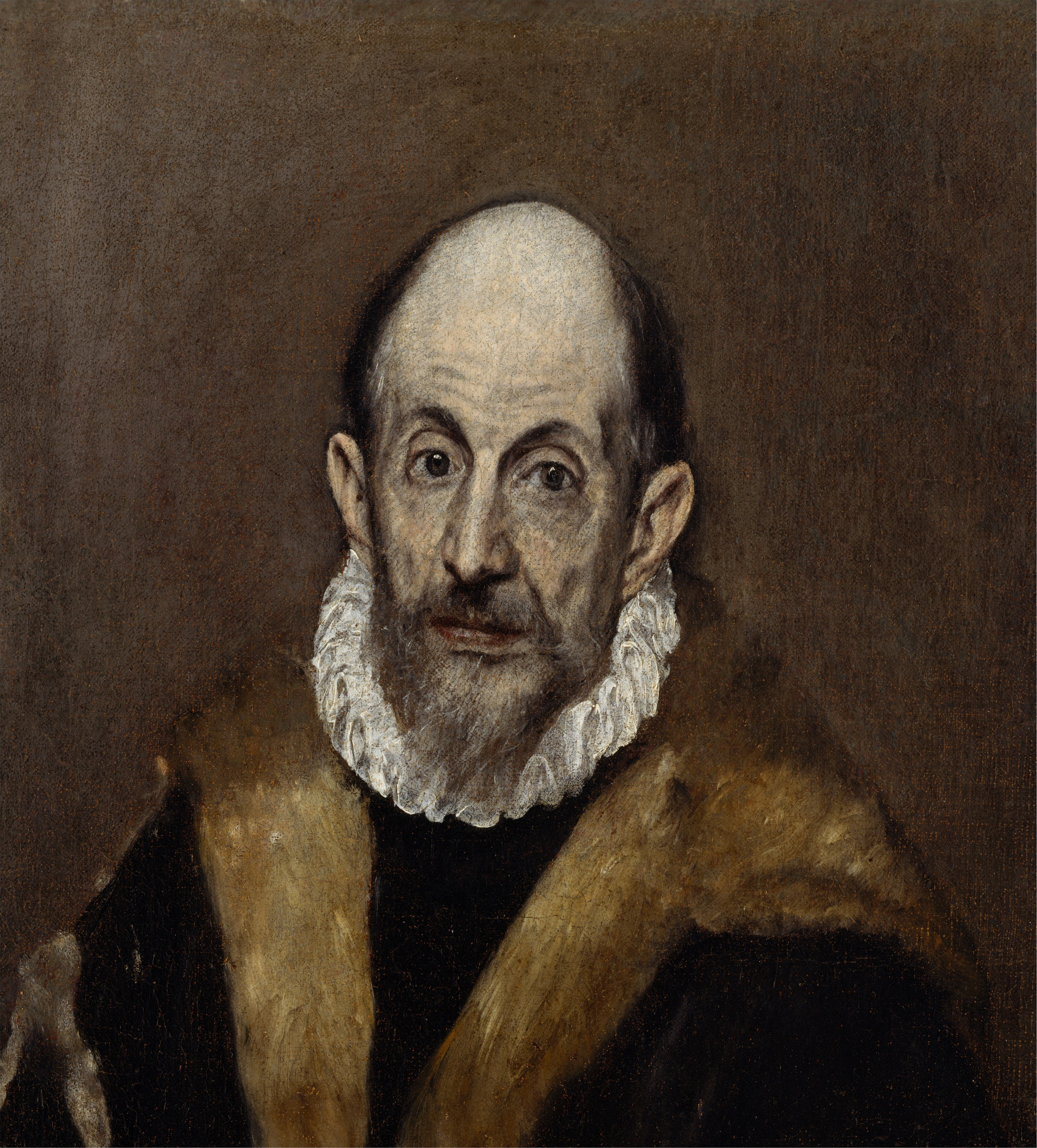
El Greco

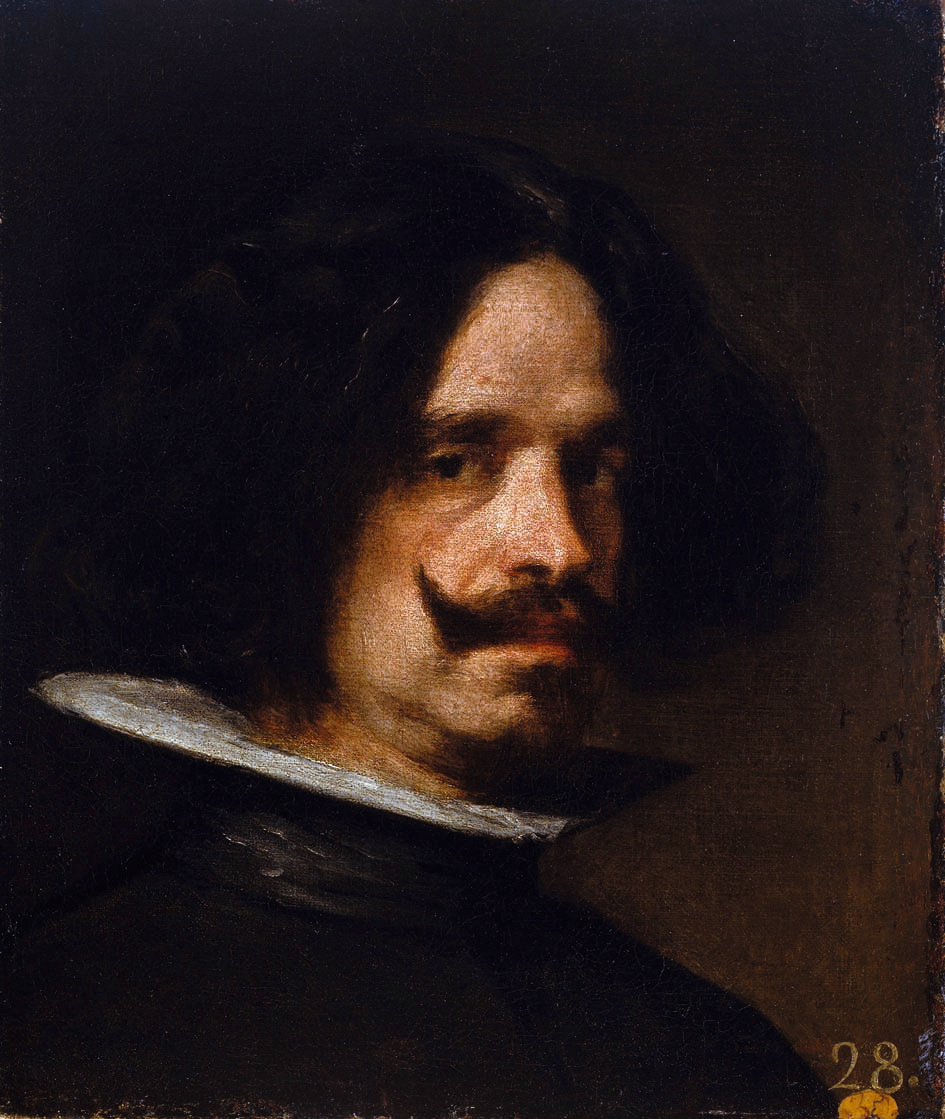
Diego Velázquez

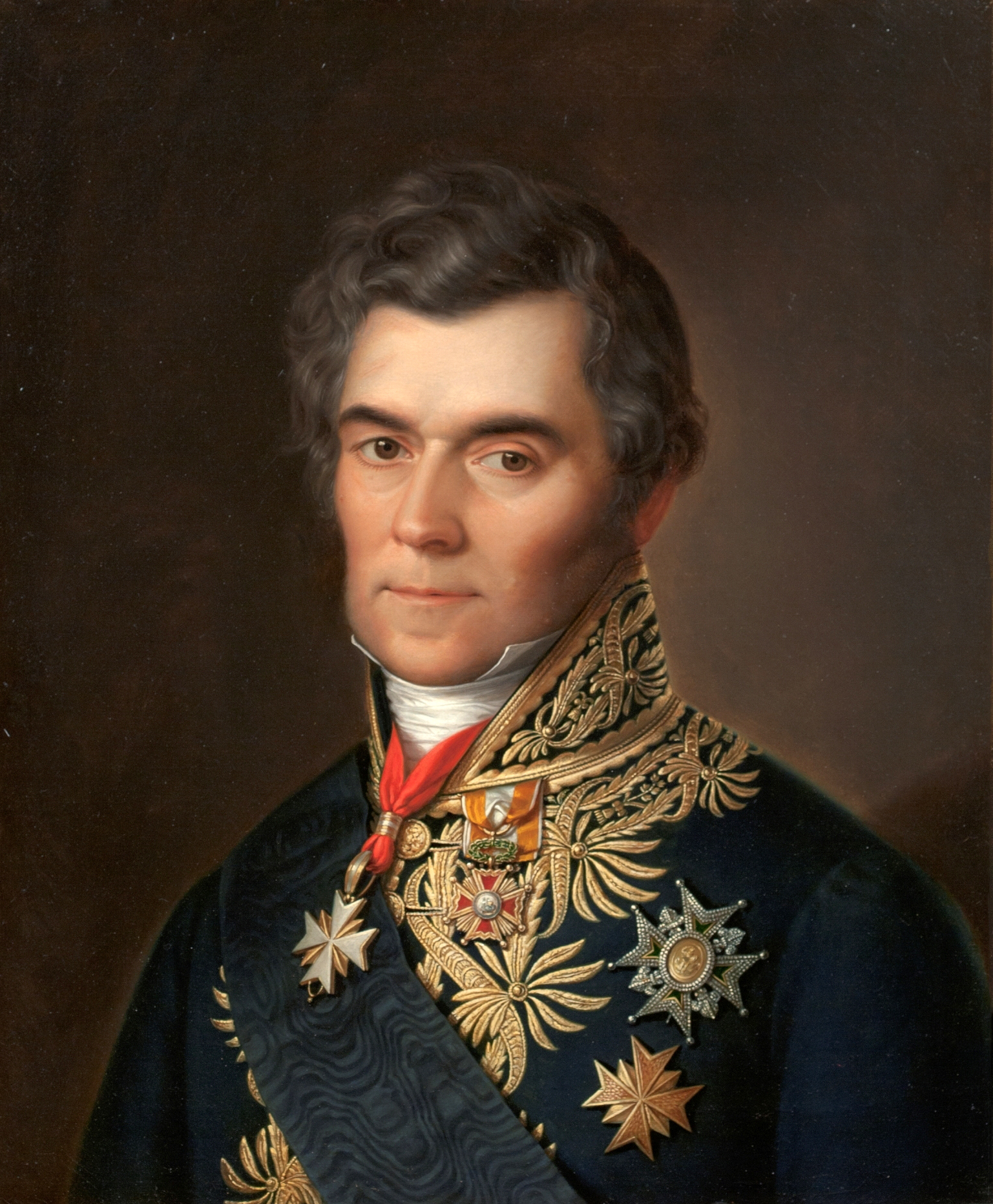
Luis de la Cruz y Ríos

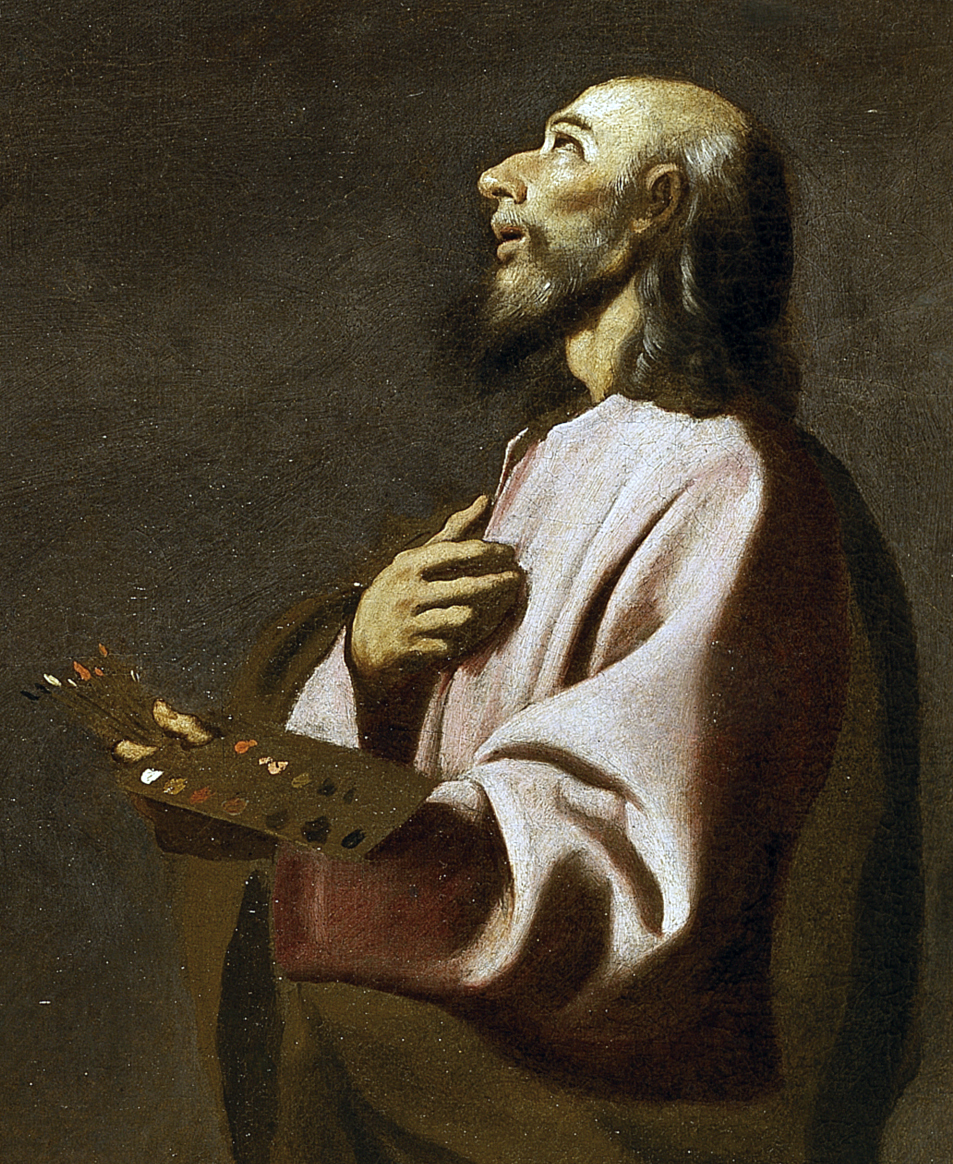
Francisco de Zurbarán

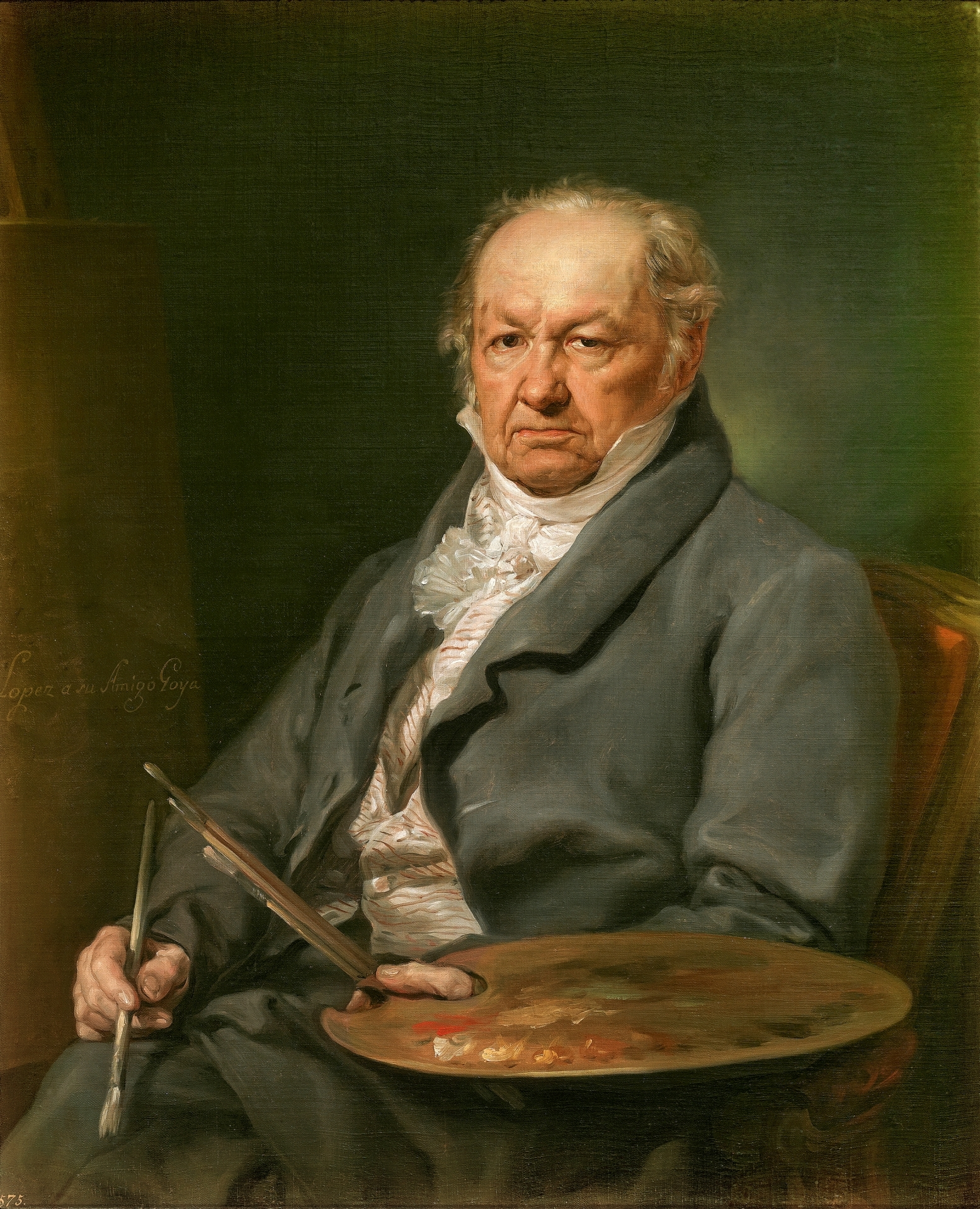
Francisco Goya

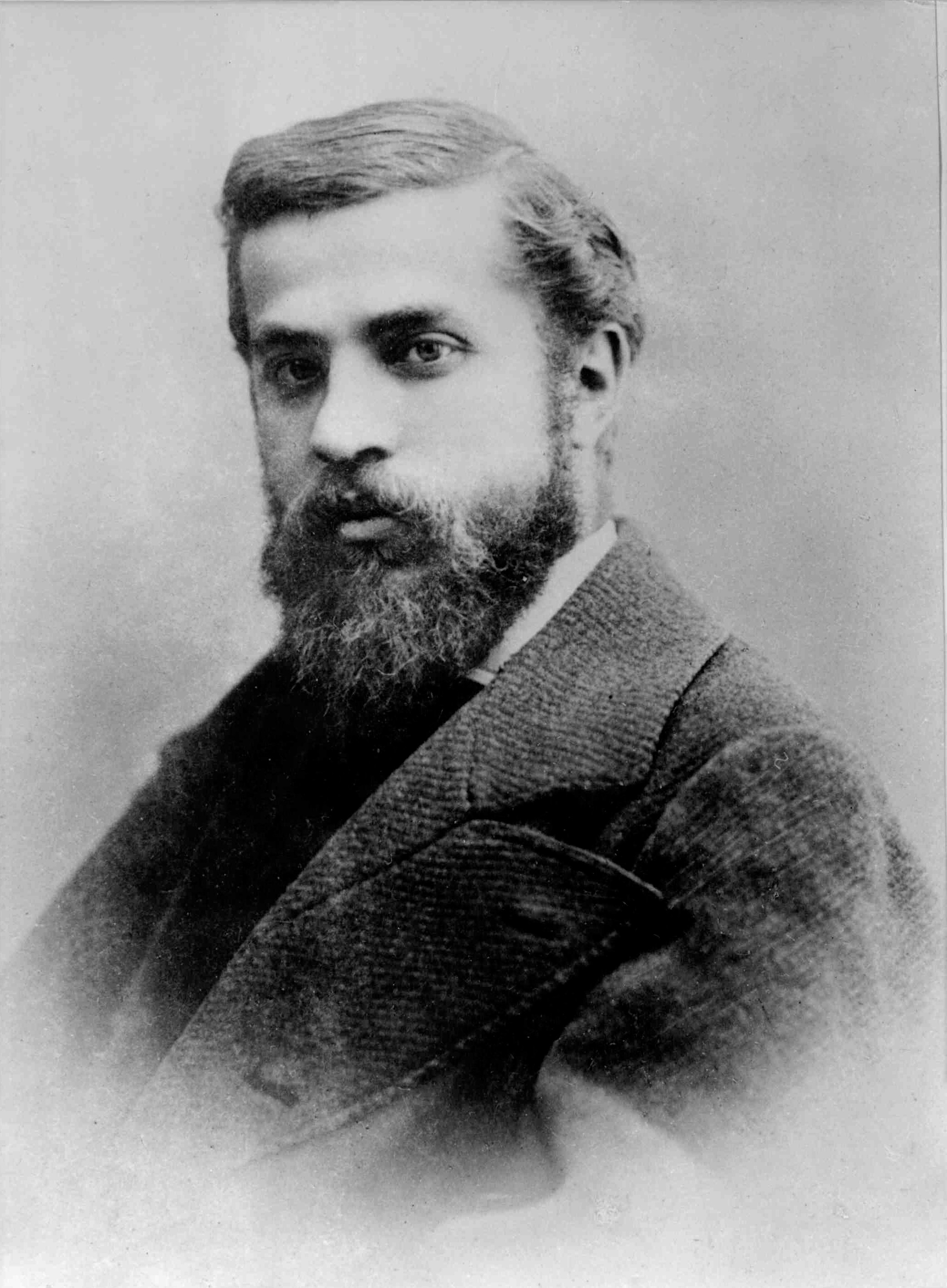
Antoni Gaudí

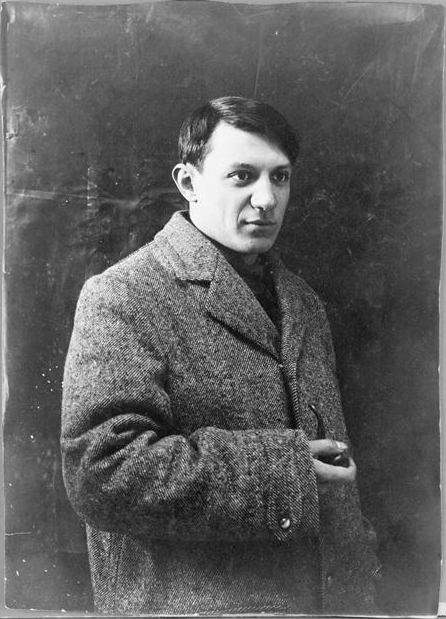
Pablo Picasso

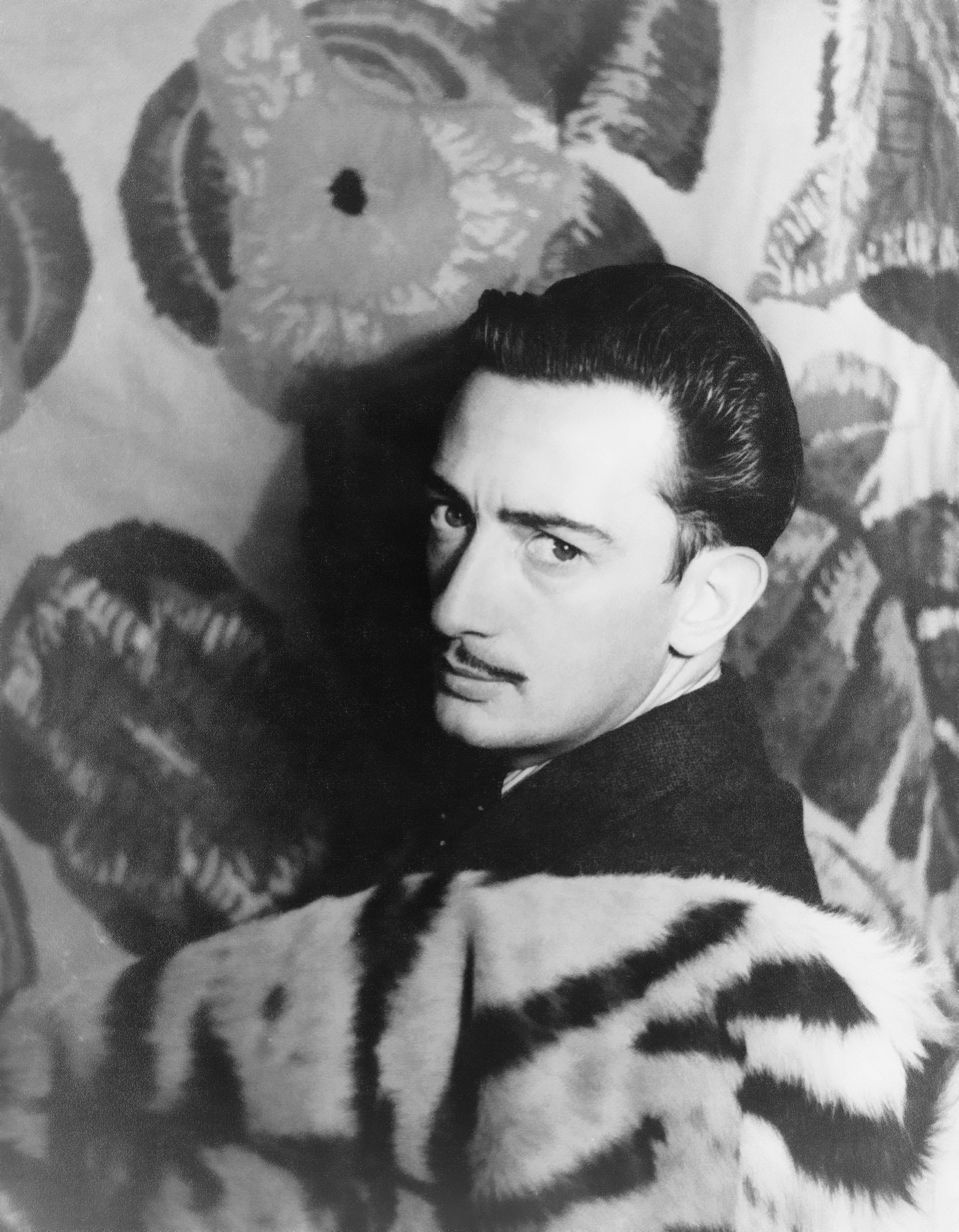
Salvador Dalí

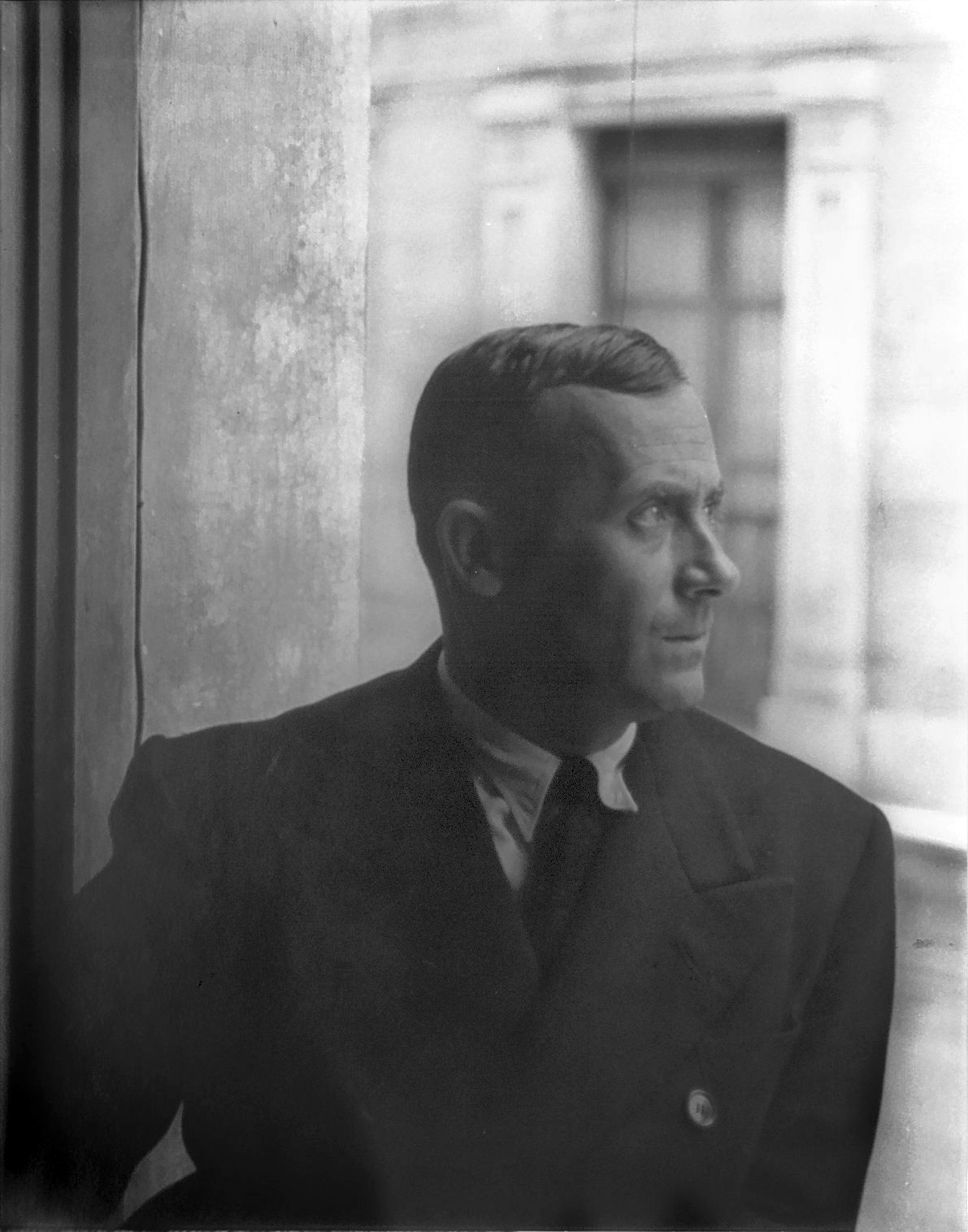
Joan Miró

- David Aja (born 1977), comics artist
- Leonardo Alenza (1807–1845), Romantic painter
- Hermenegildo Anglada (1871–1959), Catalan modernist painter
- Alonso Berruguete (c. 1488–1561), Spanish Renaissance painter and sculptor
- Pedro Berruguete (c. 1450–1504), Spanish Renaissance painter
- Aureliano de Beruete (1845–1912), painter
- Felipe Bigarny (c. 1475–1542), Spanish Renaissance sculptor
- María Blanchard (1881–1932), Cubist painter
- Lita Cabellut (born 1961), painter
- Eugenio Cajés (c. 1534–1574), Baroque painter
- Alonso Cano (1601–1667), Baroque painter
- Juan Caro de Tavira (fl. 17th century), painter
- Juan Carreño de Miranda (1614–1685), Baroque painter
- Ramon Casas (1866–1932), Catalan Modernist painter
- Antonio del Castillo (1616–1668), Baroque painter
- Charris (born 1962), painter
- Chumy Chúmez (1927–2003), cartoonist
- José de Creeft (1884–1982), Modernist sculptor and teacher
- Claudio Coello (1642–1693), Baroque painter
- Anabel Colazo (born 1993), illustrator and cartoonist
- Luis de la Cruz y Ríos (1776-1853) Spanish painter
- Salvador Dalí (1904–1989), Surrealist artist
- Óscar Domínguez (1906–1957), Surrealist artist
- Antonio María Esquivel (1806–1857), Romantic painter
- Joaquim Espalter (1809–1880), Orientalist painter
- Gregorio Fernández (1576–1636), Baroque sculptor
- Pasqual Ferry (born 1961), comics artist
- Marià Fortuny (1838–1874), Romantic painter
- Pablo Gargallo (1881–1934), Cubist sculptor
- Antoni Gaudí (1852–1926), Catalan Modernist architect and sculptor
- Francisco de Goya (1746–1828), Romantic painter and engraver
- Julio González (1876–1942), Cubist sculptor
- Eugenio Granell (1912–2001), Surrealist painter
- El Greco (1541–1614), Spanish Renaissance painter and sculptor
- Juan Gris (1887–1927), Cubist painter
- Carlos de Haes (1829–1898), Realist painter
- Francisco Herrera the Elder (c. 1590 – 1656), painter
- Francisco Herrera the Younger (1622–1685), painter and architect
- Juan de Juanes (c. 1507–1579), Spanish Renaissance painter
- Antonio López (born 1936), Realist painter and sculptor
- José de Madrazo (1781–1859), Neoclassical painter
- Juan Bautista Maíno (1581–1649), Baroque painter
- Maruja Mallo (1902–1995), Surrealist painter
- Juan Bautista Martínez del Mazo (1612–1667), Baroque painter
- Pedro de Mena (1628–1688), Baroque sculptor
- Joaquin Mir (1873–1940), Catalan Modernist painter
- Joan Miró (1893–1983), Surrealist painter, sculptor and ceramist
- Juan Fernández Navarrete (1526–1579), Spanish Renaissance painter
- Isidre Nonell (1872–1911), Modernist painter
- Darío de Regoyos (1857–1913), Impressionist painter
- Jusepe de Ribera (1591–1652), Baroque painter
- Lluís Rigalt (1814–1894), Romantic painter
- Diego de Siloé (c. 1495–1563), Spanish Renaissance architect and sculptor
- Joaquín Sorolla (1863–1923), Impressionist painter
- Bartolomé Esteban Murillo (1618–1682), Baroque painter
- Pilar Nouvilas i Garrigolas (1854–1938), Spanish painter
- Bartolomé Ordóñez (c. 1480–1520), Spanish Renaissance sculptor
- Pedro Orrente (1580–1645), Baroque painter
- Rodrigo de Osona (c. 1440–c. 1518), Spanish Renaissance painter
- Carlos Pacheco (born 1961), comics artist
- Juan Pantoja de la Cruz (1553–1608), painter
- Laura Pérez Vernetti (born 1958), cartoonist and illustrator
- Pablo Picasso (1881–1973), painter and sculptor, co-founder of Cubism
- Francesc Ribalta (1565–1628), Baroque painter
- Luisa Roldán (1652–1706), Baroque sculptor
- Pedro Roldán (1624–1699), Baroque sculptor
- Julio Romero de Torres (1874–1930), Symbolist painter
- Eduardo Rosales (1836–1873), Purist painter
- Santiago Rusiñol (1861–1931), Catalan Modernist painter and poet
- Alonso Sánchez Coello (1531–1588), Spanish Renaissance painter
- Juan Sánchez Cotán (1560–1627), Baroque painter
- Antoni Tàpies (1923–2012), abstract Expressionist painter
- Trini Tinturé (1935–2024), cartoonist and illustrator
- Luis Tristán (c. 1585–1624), Spanish Renaissance painter
- Juan de Valdés Leal (1622–1690), Baroque painter
- Juan Van der Hamen (1596–1631), Romantic painter
- Eugenio Lucas Velázquez (1817–1870), Romantic painter
- Diego Velázquez (1599–1660), Baroque painter
- Jenaro Pérez Villaamil (1807–1854), painter
- Fernando Yáñez de la Almedina (1505–1537), Spanish Renaissance painter
- Ignacio Zuloaga (1870–1945), painter
- Francisco de Zurbarán (1598–1644), Baroque painter

== Explorers and conquerors ==
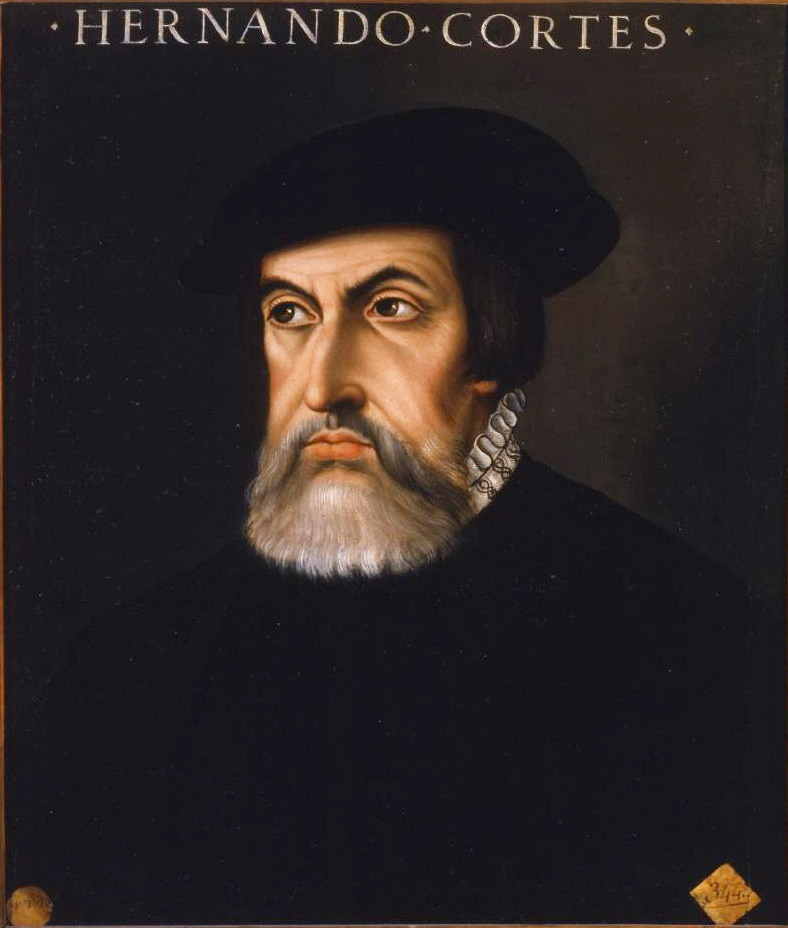
Hernán Cortés

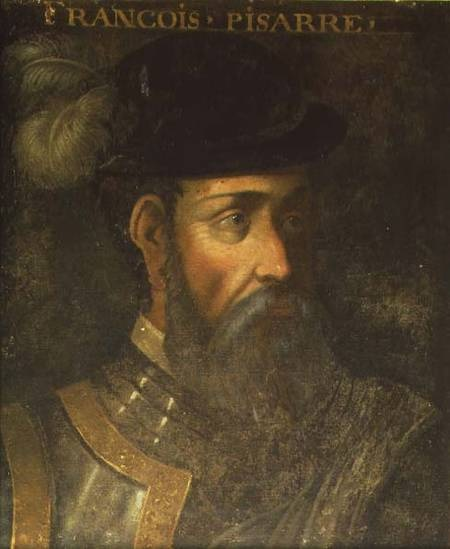
Francisco Pizarro

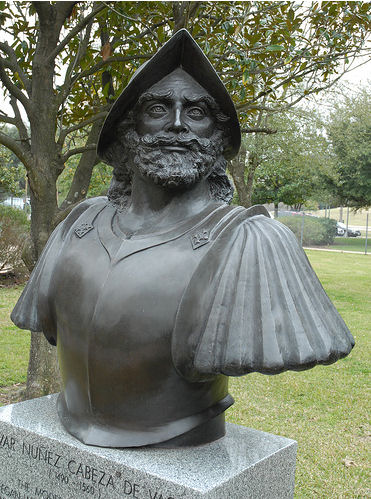
Álvar Núñez Cabeza de Vaca

- Lope de Aguirre (1511–1561), soldier and adventurer, explored the Amazon River looking for El Dorado
- Diego de Almagro (1475–1538), explorer and conquistador, first European in Chile
- Luis de Moscoso Alvarado (1505–1551), explorer and conquistador.
- Juan Bautista de Anza (1736–1788), soldier and explorer, founded San Francisco, California
- Sebastián de Belalcázar (1480–1551), first explorer in search of El Dorado in 1535 and conqueror of Ecuador and southern Colombia (Presidencia of Quito), founded Quito 1534, Cali 1536, Pasto 1537, and Popayán 1537
- Fray Tomás de Berlanga (1487–1551), bishop of Panama, discovered the Galápagos Islands
- Juan Bermúdez (1450–1520), explorer and skier, discovered the Bermuda Islands
- Álvar Núñez Cabeza de Vaca (c. 1490–c. 1559), first European to explore the southwestern of what is now the United States (1528–1536), also explored South America (1540–1542)
- Juan Rodríguez Cabrillo (1499–1543), explorer, discovered California
- Andrés Dorantes de Carranza (ca. 1500–1550), explorer and one of the four last survivors of the Narváez expedition.
- Gabriel de Castilla (1577–1620), sailor; in 1603 he became probably the first man ever to sight Antarctica
- Cosme Damián Churruca (1761–1805), explorer, astronomer and naval officer, mapped the Strait of Magellan (1788–1789)
- Francisco Vásquez de Coronado (c. 1510–1554), explored New Mexico and other parts of the southwest of what is now the United States (1540–1542)
- Hernán Cortés (1485–1547), conquistador of the Aztec Empire, explorer of Baja California Peninsula
- Juan Sebastián Elcano (1476–1526), explorer and sailor, first man to circumnavigate the world
- Gaspar de Espinosa (1467/1477–1537), soldier and explorer, first European to reach the coast of Nicaragua, co-founder of Panama City
- Diego Duque de Estrada (1589–1647), soldier, explorer, writer
- Salvador Fidalgo (1756–1803), naval officer and cartographer, explored Alaska in 1790, he named Cordova, Port Gravina, and Valdez
- Miguel López de Legazpi (1502–1572), explored and conquered the Philippine Islands in 1565
- Vasco Núñez de Balboa (1475–1519), first European to sight the Pacific Ocean, founder of Darién
- Francisco de Orellana (c. 1500–c. 1549), first European to explore the Amazon River
- Pedrarias Dávila (Pedro Arias de Ávila, 1440–1531), conquistador, founder of Panama and governor of Nicaragua
- Francisco Pizarro (1471–1541), conqueror of the Inca Empire in Peru
- Juan Ponce de León (1460–1521), first European to explore Florida (1513); founded the first European settlement in Puerto Rico (1508)
- Alonso del Castillo Maldonado (died c. 1540), explorer and one of the four last survivors of the Narváez expedition.
- Gaspar de Portolà (c. 1717–aft. 1784), explorer, founder of Monterey, California
- Bartolomé Ruiz (c. 1482–1532), first European to explore Ecuador; pilot for Pizarro and Columbus
- Hernando de Soto (1500–1542), explorer and conquistador, first European to explore the plains of eastern North America; discovered the Mississippi River and the Ohio River
- Pedro de Valdivia (c. 1500–1554), conquistador of Chile, founder of Santiago, Concepción, and Valdivia
- Pedro de los Ríos y Gutiérrez de Aguayo (died 1547), Royal Spanish governor of Castilla del Oro
- Vicente Yáñez Pinzón (c. 1461?–1514), explorer and sailor, first European to reach the coast of Brazil
- Amaro Rodríguez Felipe (c. 1678–1747), pirate
- Isabel de Urquiola (1854–1911), explorer

== Film directors ==
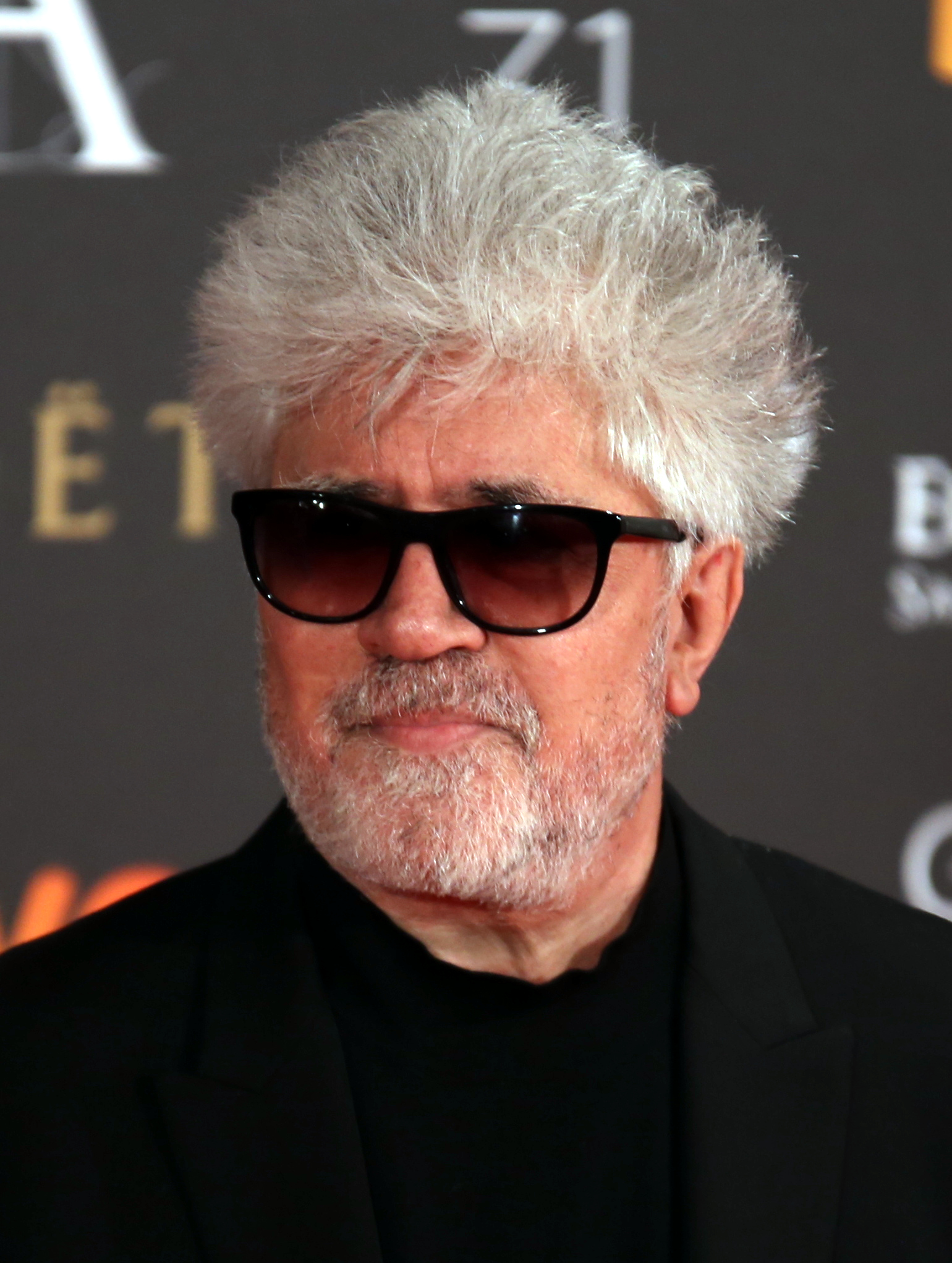
Pedro Almodóvar

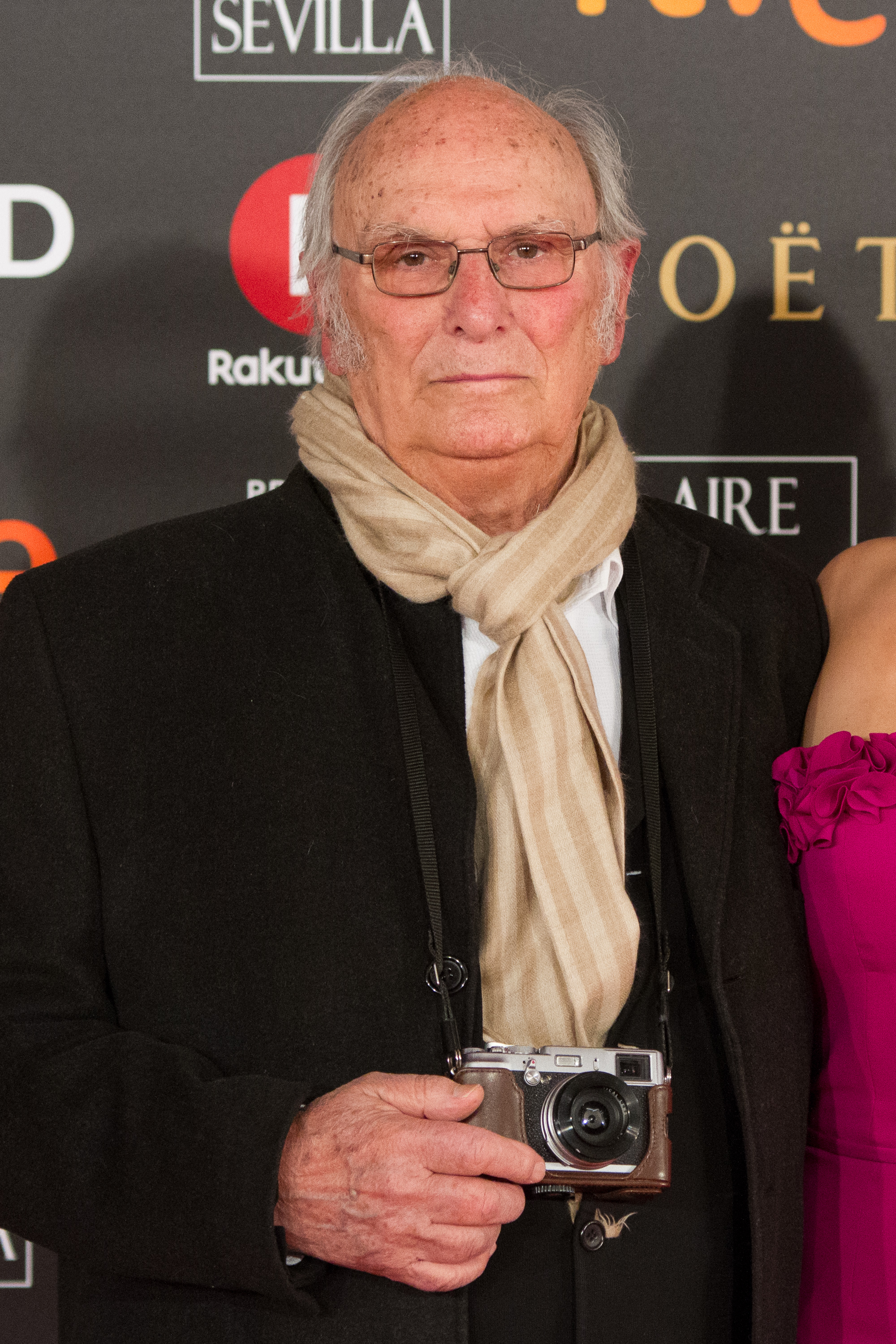
Carlos Saura

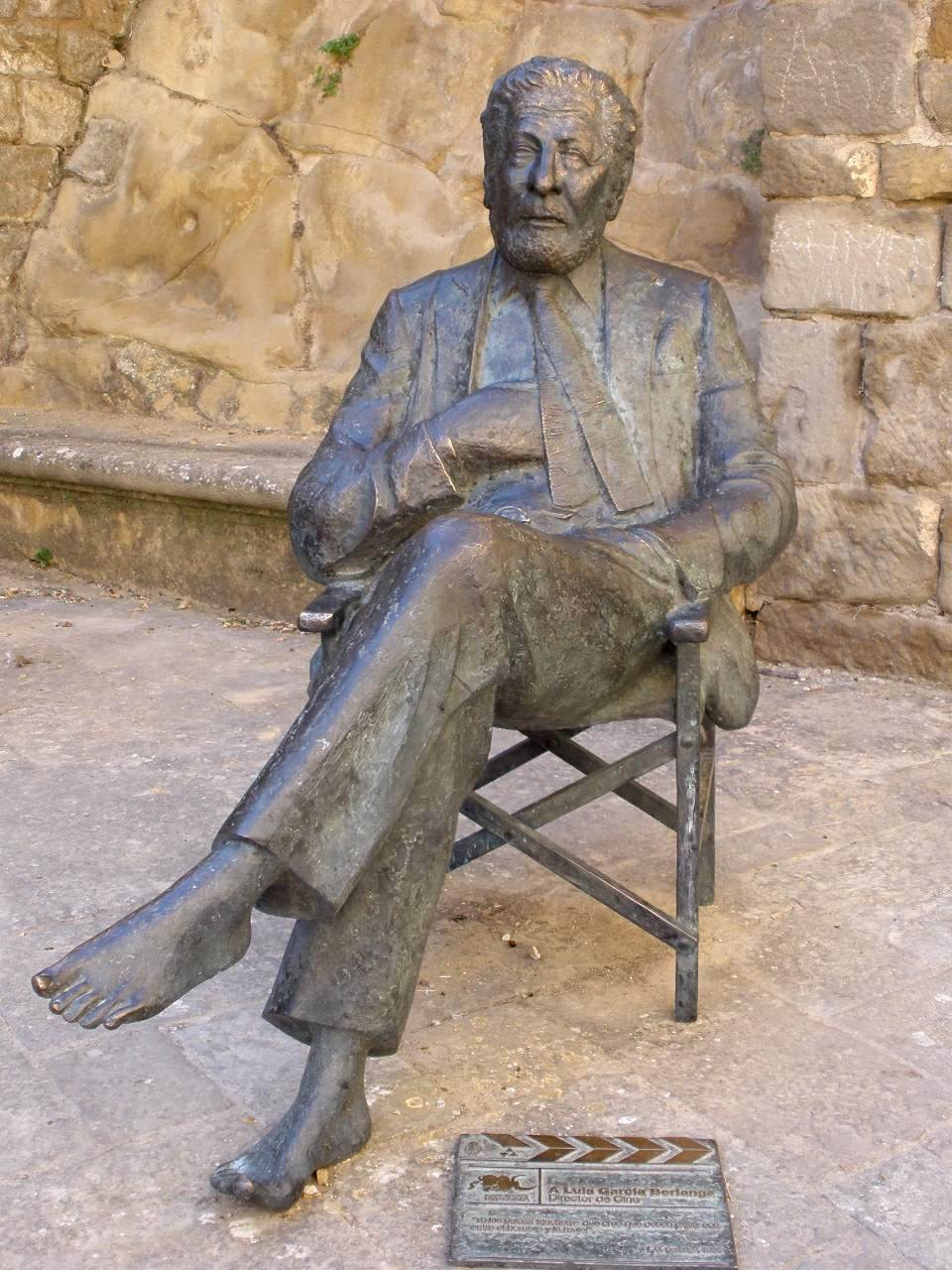
Luis García Berlanga

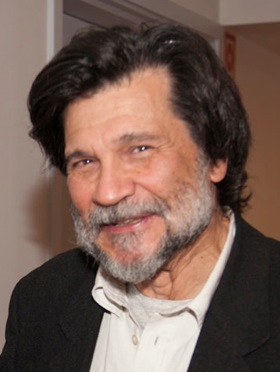
Victor Erice

- Pedro Almodóvar (born 1949)
- Alejandro Amenábar (born 1972)
- Montxo Armendáriz (born 1949)
- Carlos Atanes (born 1971)
- Juanma Bajo Ulloa (born 1967)
- Jaume Balagueró (born 1968)
- Juan Antonio Bardem (1922–2002)
- Juan Antonio Bayona (born 1975)
- Icíar Bollaín (born 1967)
- José Luis Borau (1929–2012)
- Luis Buñuel (1900–1983)
- Mario Camus (1935–2021)
- Segundo de Chomón (1871–1929)
- Isabel Coixet (born 1962)
- Helena Cortesina (1903–1984)
- Agustín Díaz Yanes (born 1950)
- Víctor Erice (1940)
- Arantxa Echevarría (1968)
- Fernando Fernán Gómez (1921–2007)
- Amparo Fortuny
- Jesús Franco (1930–2013)
- José Luis Garci (born 1944)
- Luis García Berlanga (1921–2010)
- Manuel Gutiérrez Aragón (born 1942)
- Álex de la Iglesia (born 1965)
- Fernando León de Aranoa (born 1968)
- Bigas Luna (1946–2013)
- Ana Mariscal (1923–1995)
- Basilio Martín Patino (1930–2017)
- Julio Médem (born 1958)
- Pilar Miró (1940–1997)
- Josefina Molina (born 1936)
- Paul Naschy (1934–2009)
- Amando de Ossorio (1918–2001)
- Ventura Pons (1945–2024)
- Gracia Querejeta (1962)
- Clara Roquet (1988)
- José Luis Sáenz de Heredia (1911–1992)
- Carlos Saura (1932–2023)
- Santiago Segura (born 1965)
- David Trueba (born 1969)
- Fernando Trueba (born 1955)
- Agustí Villaronga (1953–2023)
- Benito Zambrano (born 1964)
- Lydia Zimmermann (born 1966)
- Iván Zulueta (1943–2009)

== Leaders and politicians ==
=== Medieval ancestors ===
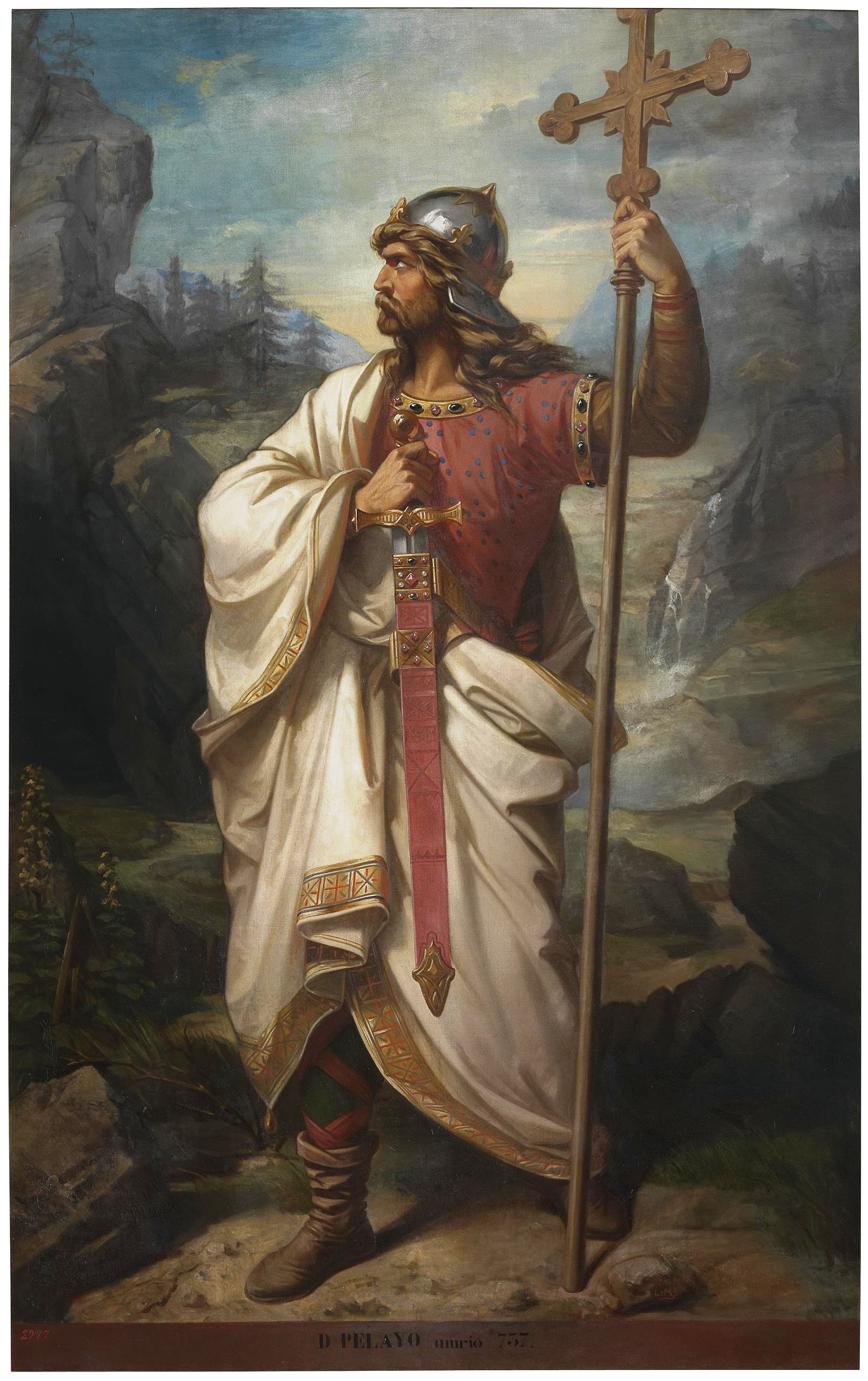
Pelagius of Asturias

- Liuvigild (519-586) was a Visigothic king of Hispania and Septimania from 567 to 586.
- Pelayo of Asturias (690–737), founding king of the Kingdom of Asturias
- Abd-ar-Rahman III (891–961), Emir (912–929) and Caliph of Córdoba (929–961)
- Al-Mansur (c. 938–1002), de facto ruler of Muslim Al-Andalus in late 10th and early 11th centuries
- Alfonso X of Castile (1221–1284)

=== Modern ===
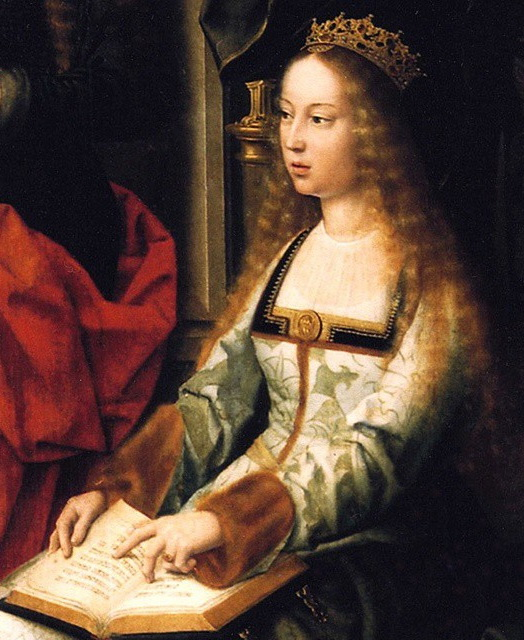
Isabella I of Castile

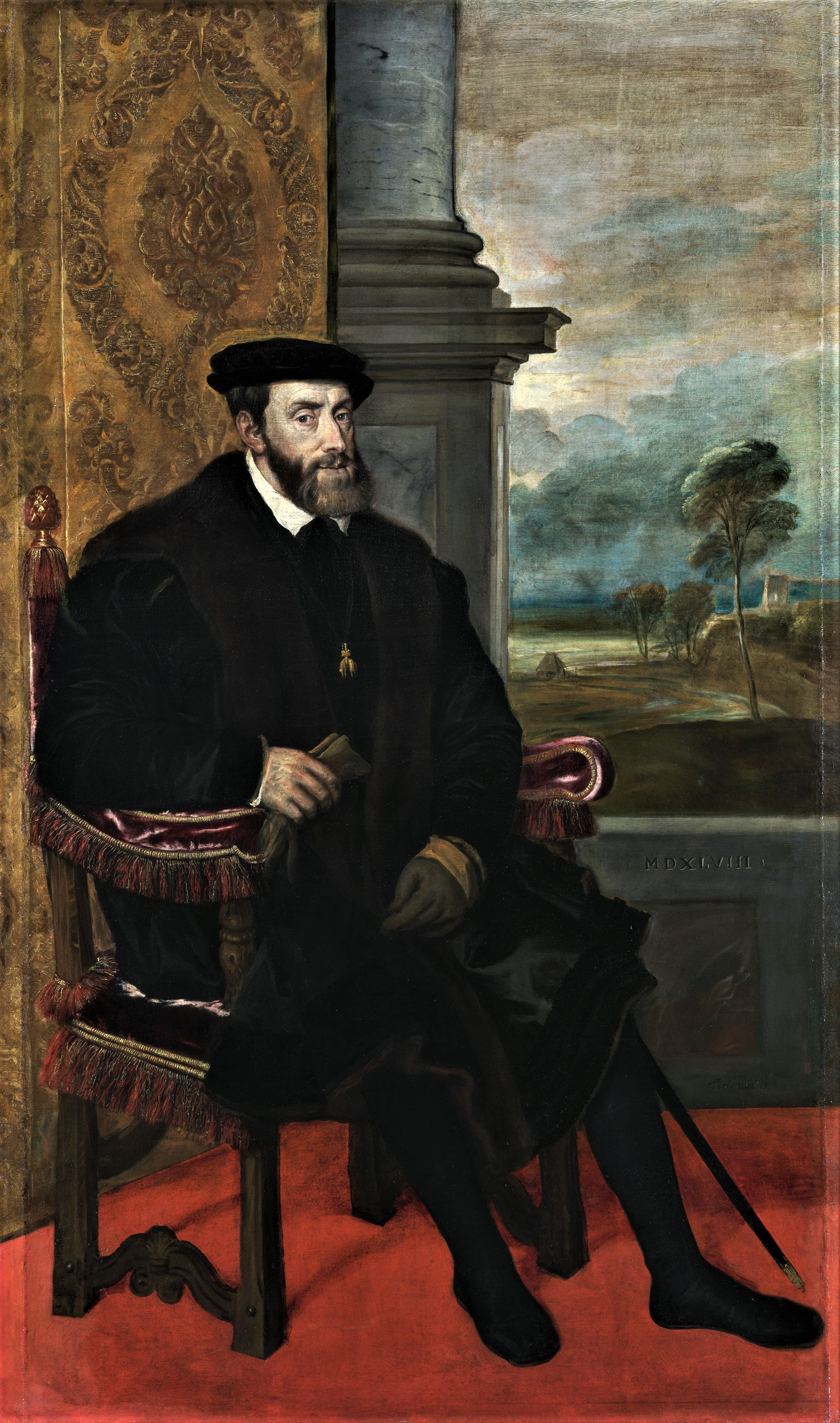
Charles V, Holy Roman Emperor

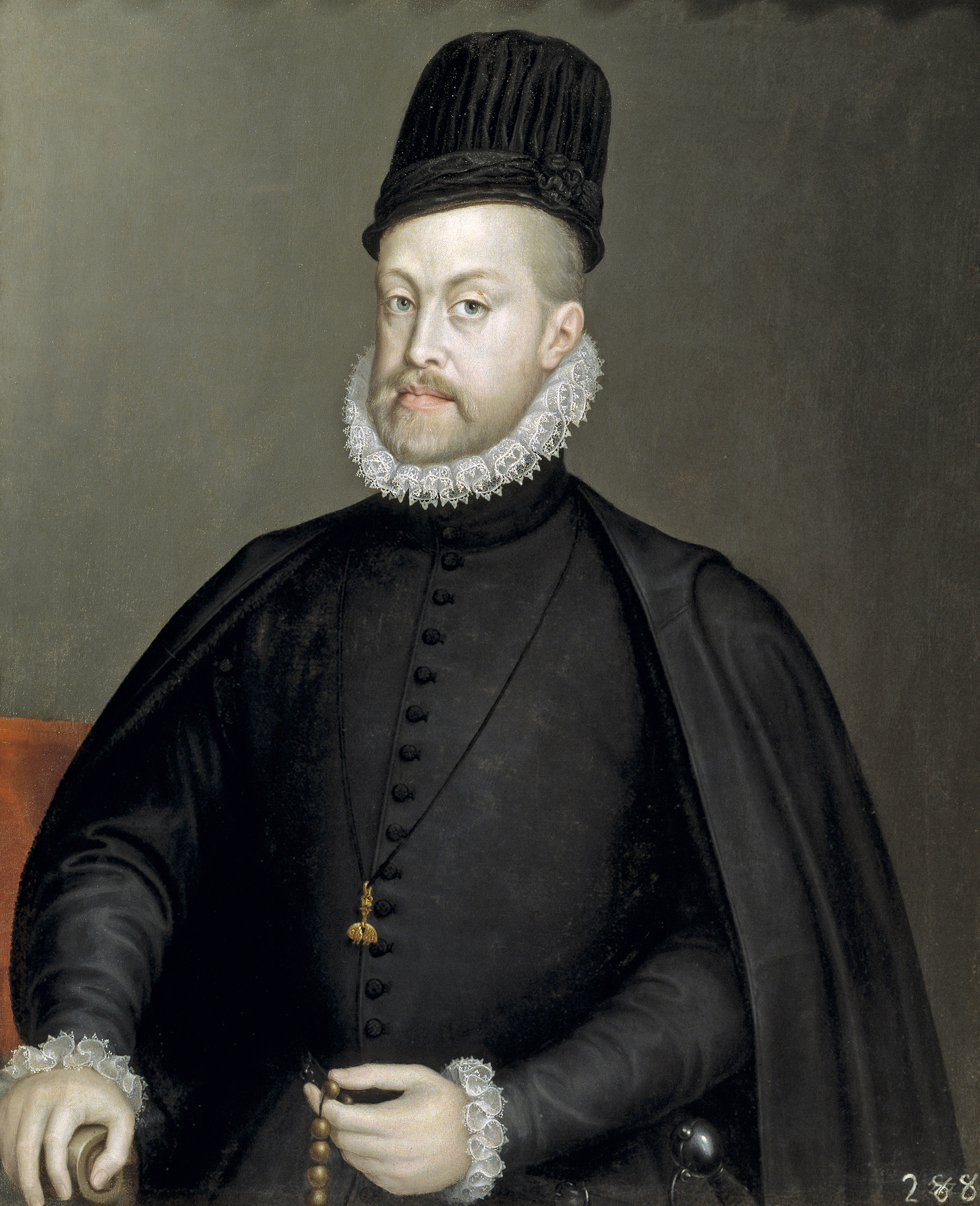
Philip II of Spain

- Isabella of Castile, the Catholic (1451–1504), Queen of Castile and León (1474–1504, with Ferdinand)
- Ferdinand II, the Catholic (1452–1516), King of Aragon (1479–1516), Castile and León (1474–1504, with Isabella), Sicily (1479–1516), Naples (1504–1516) and Valencia (1479–1516)
- Francisco Jiménez de Cisneros (1436–1517), cardinal, statesman, and regent of Spain
- Juana of Castile, frequently called "the Mad", queen of Castile and León; daughter of Isabella and Ferdinand
- Charles V (1500–1558), Holy Roman Emperor (1530–1556 but did not formally abdicate until 1558), ruler of the Burgundian territories (1506–1555), King of Spain (1516–1556), King of Naples and Sicily (1516–1554), Archduke of Austria (1519–1521), King of the Romans (or German King); often referred to as "Carlos V", but he ruled officially as "Carlos I", hence "Charles I of Spain"
- Philip II (1526–1598), King of Spain (1556–1598)
- Philip V (1683–1746), King of Spain (1700–1746)
- Charles III (1716–1788), King of Spain (1759–1788)
- Ferdinand VII (1784–1833), King of Spain (1813–1833)
- Manuel Godoy y Álvarez de Faria Ríos (1767-1851), First Secretary of State of the Kingdom from 1792 to 1797, 1st Prince of the Peace, 1st Duke of Alcudia, 1st Duke of Sueca, 1st Baron of Mascalbó
- Manuel de Aróstegui Sáenz de Olamendi (1758–1813), liberal Spanish politician

=== Contemporary ===
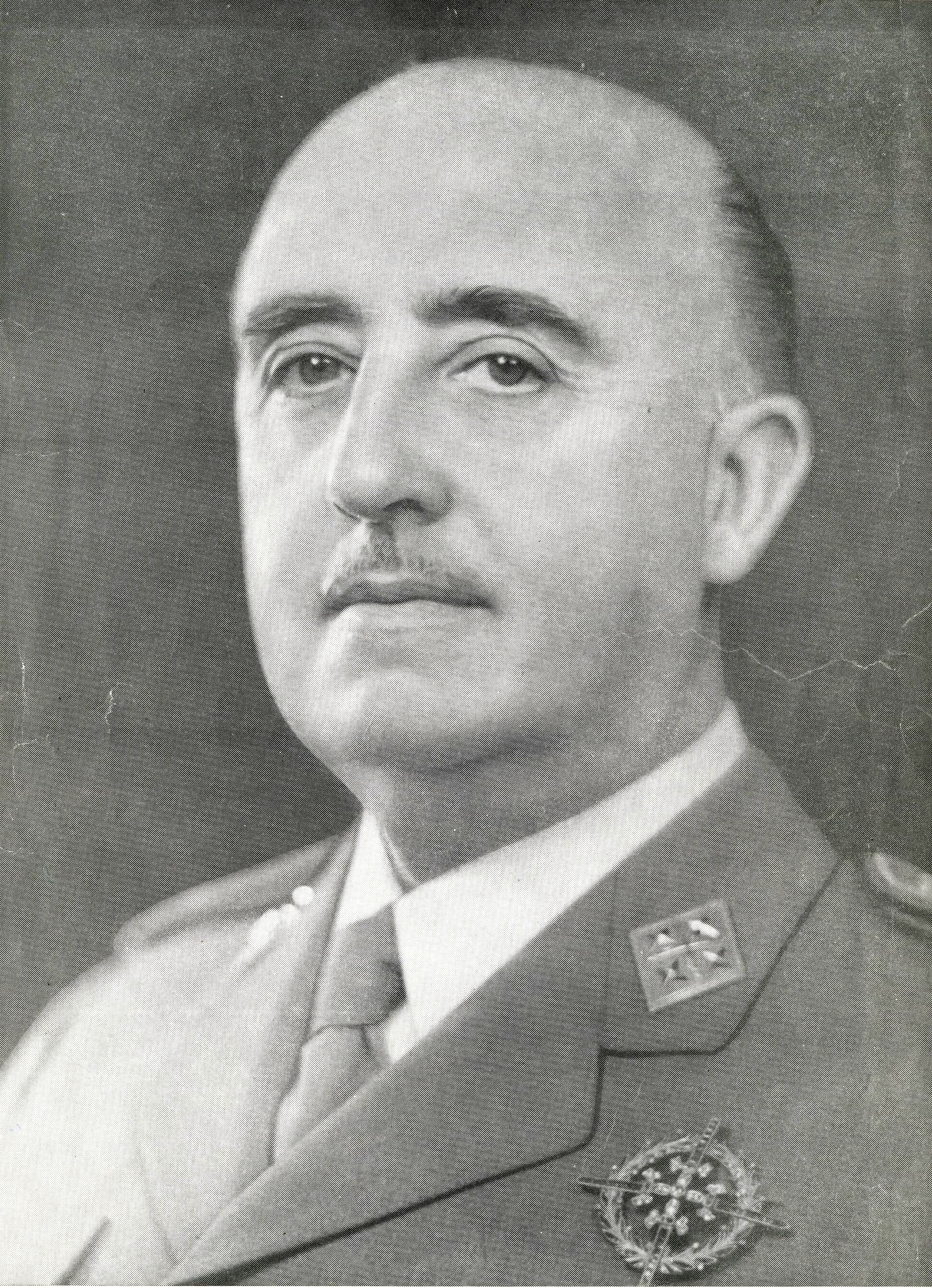
Francisco Franco

- Leopoldo O'Donnell y Jorris, (1809–1867), general and Prime Minister (1856; 1858–1863; 1864–1866); 1st Duke of Tetuán
- Juan Prim (1814–1870), general, liberal leader, revolutionary and statesman
- Antonio Cánovas del Castillo (1828–1897), Prime Minister
- Práxedes Mateo Sagasta (1825–1903), eight times Prime Minister
- Fernando de los Ríos Urruti (1879–1949) was a Minister of Justice, Minister of State, and a Spanish Politician.
- 20th and 21st centuries:
  - Manuel Azaña (1880–1940), Premier (twice) and President during the Second Spanish Republic
  - José María Aznar (born 1953), Prime Minister (1996–2004)
  - Josep Borrell (born 1947), President of the European Parliament (2004–2007)
  - Leopoldo Calvo-Sotelo (1926–2008), Prime Minister (1981–1982)
  - Santiago Carrillo (1915–2012), the General Secretary of the Communist Party of Spain (PCE) from 1960 to 1982
  - Buenaventura Durruti (1896–1936), anarchist leader
  - Francisco Franco (1892–1975), Army general and president, ruled Spain for 36 years as "Caudillo" (1939–1975)
  - María Teresa Fernández de la Vega (born 1949), Spanish Socialist Workers' Party politician and the first female Vice President
  - Felipe González (born 1942), Prime Minister (1982–1996)
  - Sara Giménez Giménez (born 1977), president, Fundación Secretariado Gitano
  - Dolores Ibárruri (1895–1989), known as "La Pasionaria", leader of the Spanish Civil War and communist politician
  - Eugenio Montero Ríos (1832–1914) Spanish Prime Minister and President of the Senate of Spain.
  - Juan Carlos I (born 1938), King of Spain (1975–2014)
  - Federica Montseny (1905–1994), Minister of Health (1936–1937) and anarchist - first woman to be a minister in Spanish History
  - José Antonio Primo de Rivera (1903–1936)
  - Mariano Rajoy (born 1955), Prime Minister (2011–2018)
  - Rodrigo Rato (born 1949), managing director of the IMF since 2004
  - Alfredo Pérez Rubalcaba (1951–2019), Deputy Prime Minister, Minister of Education, Minister of the Interior and Minister of Defence
  - Benjamín Rubio (1925–2007), trade unionist
  - Pedro Sánchez (born 1972), Prime Minister (2018–present)
  - Ana Sigüenza (born c. 1957), general secretary of the CNT (2000–2003) and anarchist - first woman to be secretary general of a national trade union centre in Spain
  - Adolfo Suárez (1932–2014), Prime Minister (1976–1981)
  - Javier Solana (born 1942), Secretary General of NATO (1995–1999) and High Representative (since 1999) of the CFSP of the Council of the European Union
  - Matilde de la Torre (1884–1946), writer, socialist and politician
  - José Luis Rodríguez Zapatero (born 1960), Prime Minister (2004–2011)
  - Felipe VI (born 1968), King of Spain since 2014

== Literature ==
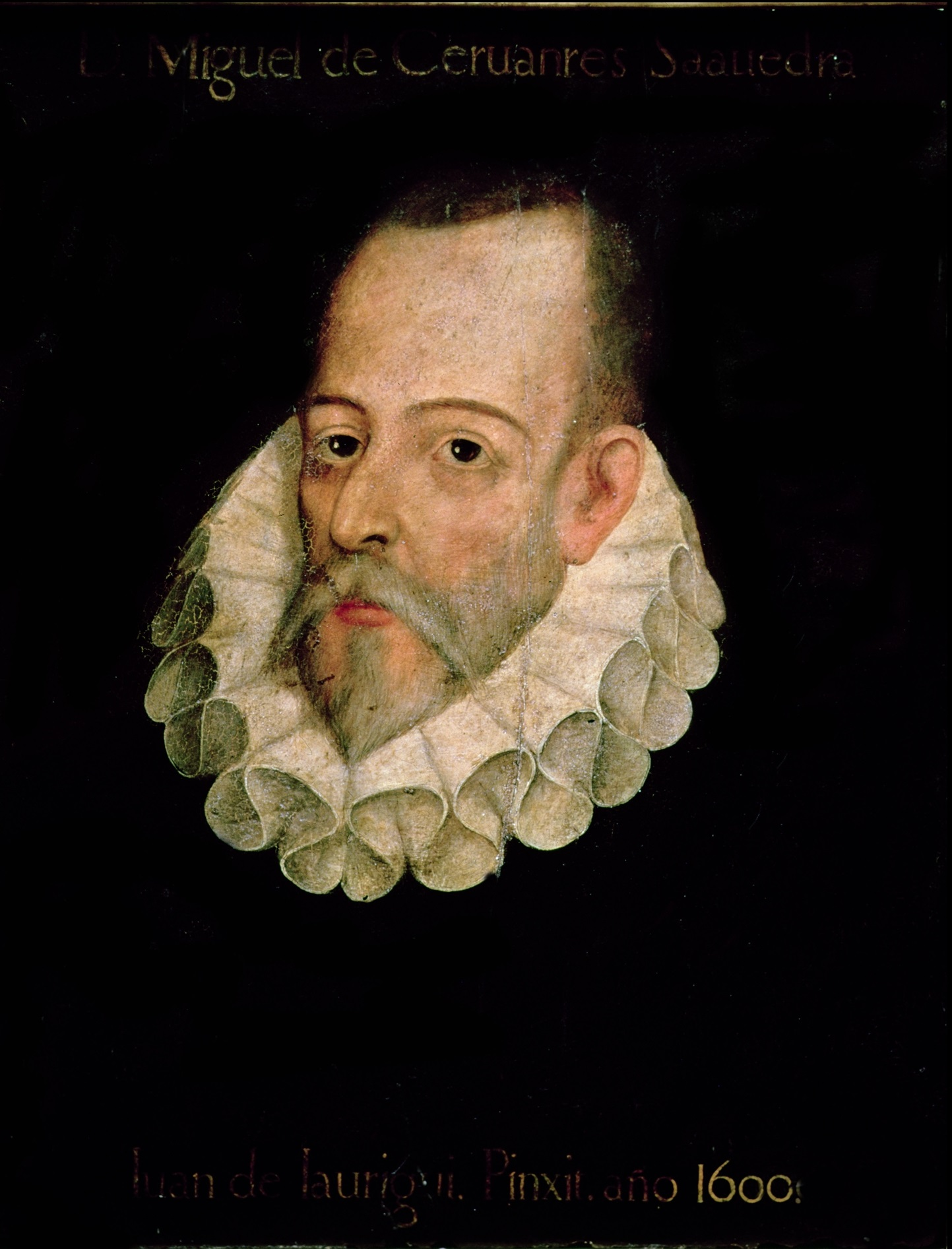
Miguel de Cervantes

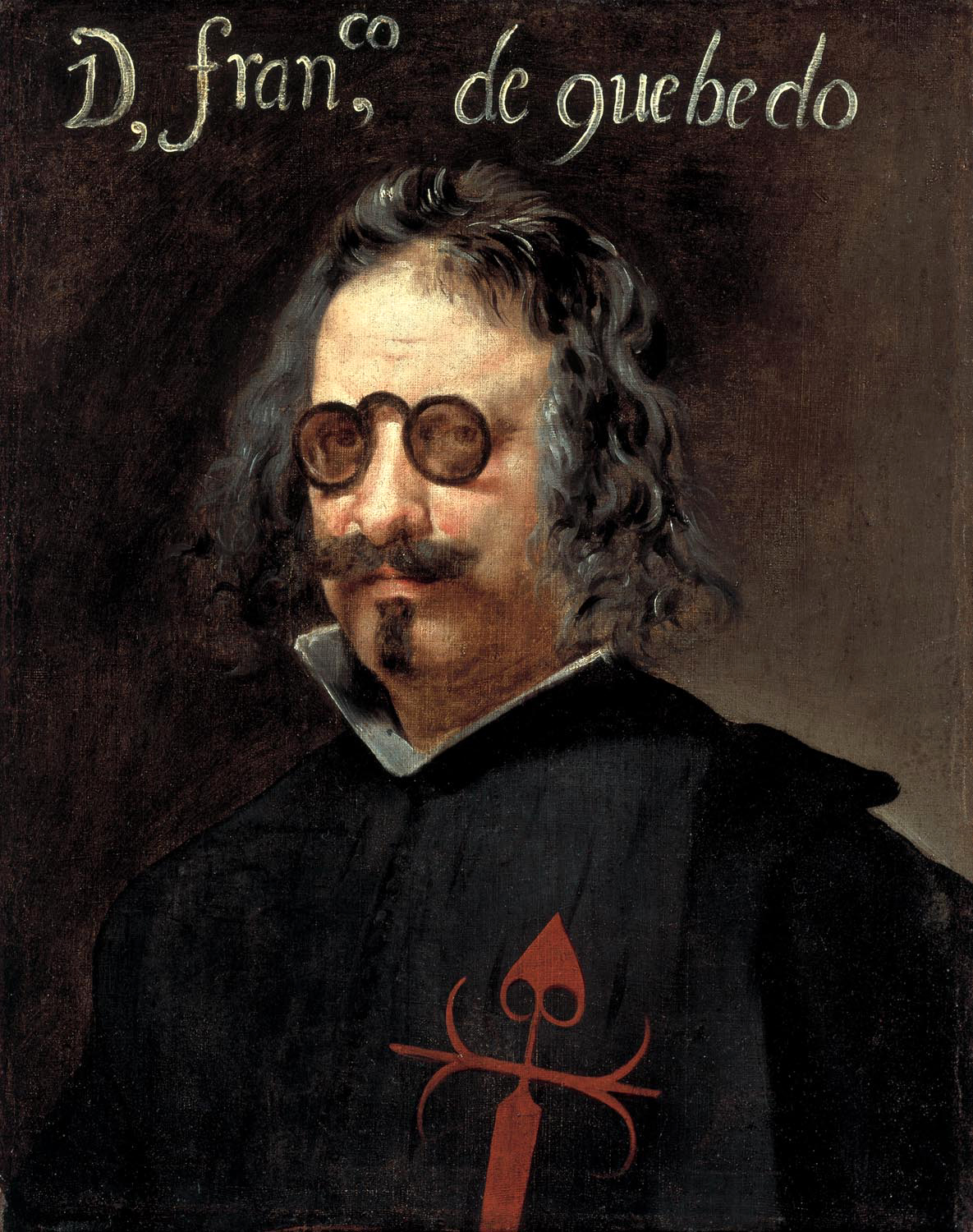
Francisco de Quevedo

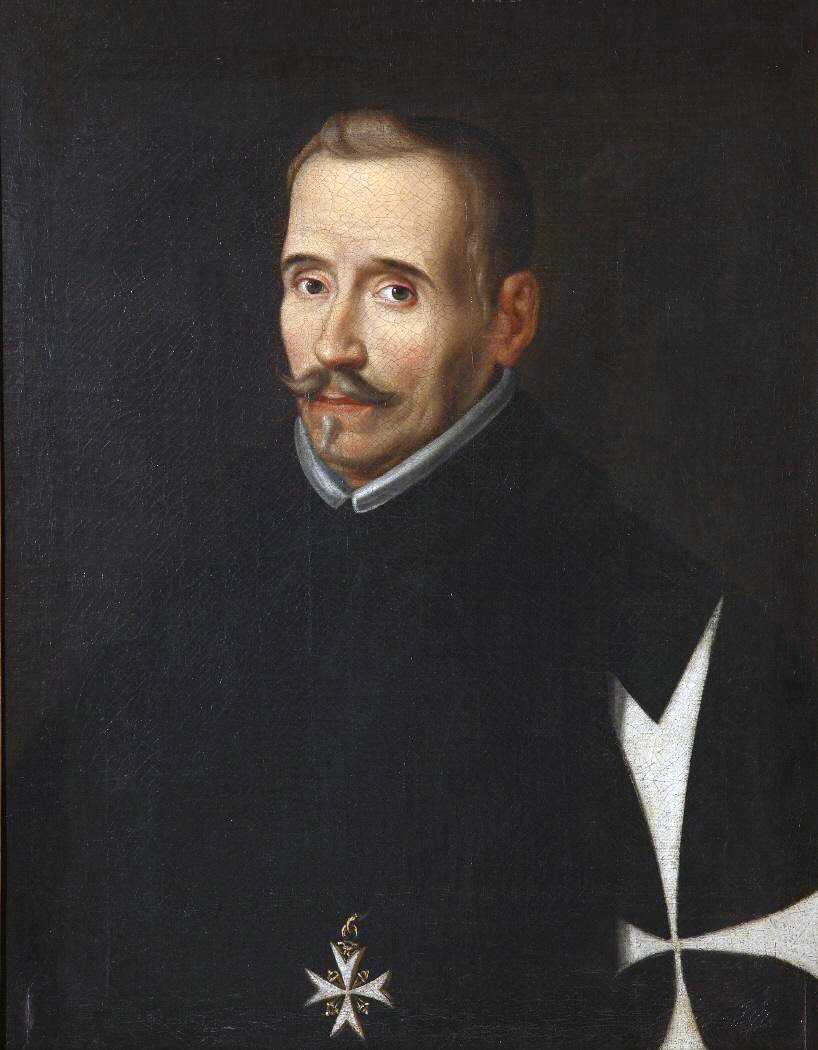
Félix Lope de Vega

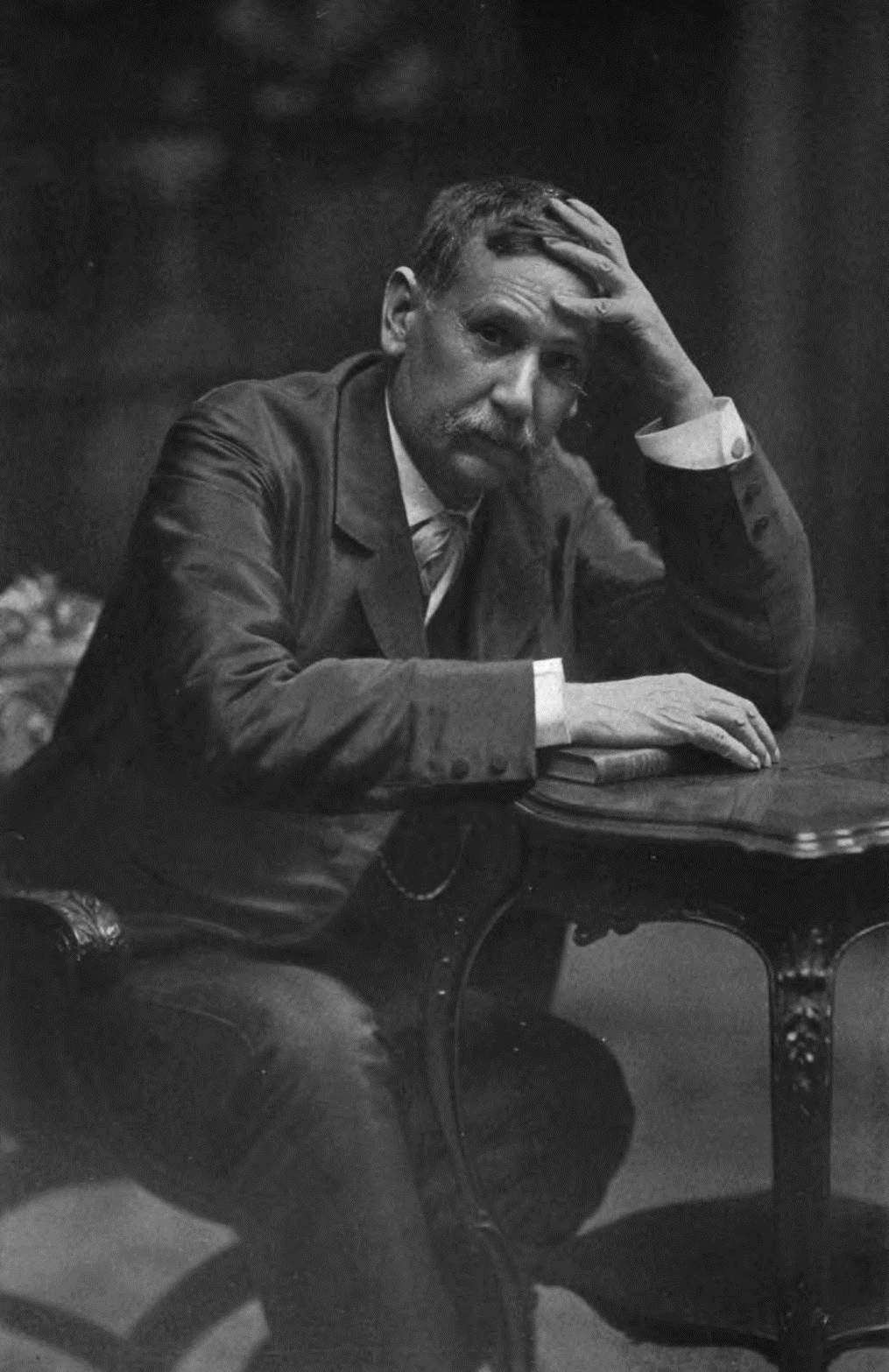
Benito Pérez Galdós

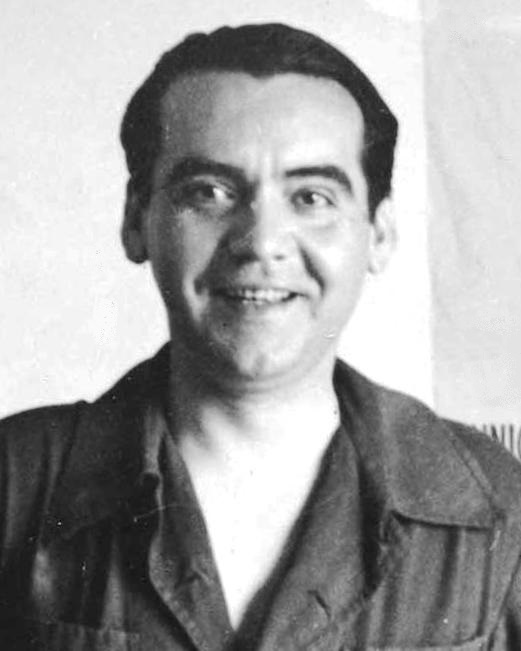
Federico García Lorca

- Rafael Alberti (1902–1999), poet, Cervantes Prize laureate (1983)
- Vicente Aleixandre (1888–1984), poet, Nobel Prize laureate (1977)
- Concepción Arenal (1820–1893), writer and feminist
- Matilde Asensi (1962), writer
- Lola Badia (1951), philologist, medievalist
- Elia Barceló (1957), writer
- Pío Baroja (1872–1956), novelist of the Generation of '98
- Gustavo Adolfo Bécquer (1836–1870), romantic poet and tale writer
- Wallada bint al-Mustakfi (994-1091), poet
- Antonio Buero Vallejo (1916–2000), playwright of the Generation of '36
- Carmen de Burgos (1867–1932), writer and journalist
- Fernán Caballero (1796–1877), writer and novelist
- Pedro Calderón de la Barca (1600–1681), playwright and poet of the Spanish Golden Age
- Clara Campoamor (1888–1972), essayist and politician
- Victoria Camps (born 1941), essayist and philosopher
- Inmaculada Casal (born 1964), journalist and television presenter
- Sofía Casanova (1861–1958), novelist, poet and journalist
- Rosalía de Castro (1837–1885), romanticist and poet
- Camilo José Cela (1916–2002), novelist, Nobel Prize laureate (1989)
- Miguel de Cervantes (1547–1616), novelist, poet and playwright, author of Don Quixote (1605 and 1615)
- Rosa Chacel (1898–1994), writer, poet and essayist
- Carmen Conde Abellán (1907–1996), writer
- Carolina Coronado (1820–1911), poet
- Miguel Delibes (1920–2010), novelist, Cervantes Prize laureate (1993)
- María Dueñas (born 1964), writer and professor
- José Echegaray (1832–1916), dramatist, Nobel Prize laureate (1904)
- Concha Espina (1869–1955), poet, writer and journalist
- Cristina Fernández Cubas (born 1945), writer and journalist
- Amanda Figueras, journalist and writer
- Gloria Fuertes (1917–1998), poet and writer
- Federico García Lorca (1898–1936), poet and dramatist of the Generation of '27
- Alicia Giménez Bartlett (born 1951), writer
- Gertrudis Gómez de Avellaneda (1814–1873), writer
- Luis de Góngora (1561–1627), lyric poet considered to be among the most prominent Spanish poets of all time
- Almudena Grandes (1960–2021), writer
- Jorge Guillén (1893–1984), poet, Cervantes Prize laureate (1976), four-time Nobel Prize nominee
- Juan Ramón Jiménez (1881–1958), poet, Nobel Prize laureate (1956)
- John of the Cross (1542–1591), mystic poet
- Carmen Laforet (1921–2004), writer
- María de la O Lejárraga (1874-1974), feminist writer, dramatist, translator and politician
- María Teresa León (1903–1988), writer and novelist
- Elvira Lindo (born 1962), writer and journalist
- Gaspar Melchor de Jovellanos (1744–1811), main figure of the Spanish Age of Enlightenment, philosopher, statesman, poet and essayist
- Antonio Machado (1875–1939), leading poet of the Generation of '98
- Salvador de Madariaga (1886–1978), essayist and two-time Nobel Prize nominee
- Jorge Manrique (1440–1479), major Castilian poet
- Juan Marsé (1933–2020), novelist and Cervantes prize laureate
- Carmen Martín Gaite (1925–2000), writer
- Ana María Matute (1925–2014), writer
- Eduardo Mendoza (born 1943), novelist and Cervantes prize laureate
- Sara Mesa (born 1976), writer
- María Moliner (1900–1981), librarian and lexicographer
- Rosa Montero (born 1951), writer and journalist
- Cristina Morales (born 1985), writer
- Juliana Morell (1594–1653), poet and humanist
- Julia Navarro (born 1953), writer
- Margarita Nelken (1898–1966), writer, essayist and feminist
- Emilia Pardo Bazán (1851–1921), writer of prose and poetry who introduced naturalism and feminist ideas to Spanish literature
- Ánxeles Penas (born 1943), poet
- Benito Pérez Galdós (1843–1920), realist novelist considered by some to be second only to Cervantes in stature as a Spanish novelist
- Arturo Pérez-Reverte (born 1951), best-selling novelist and journalist, member of the Royal Spanish Academy
- Marta Pessarrodona (born 1941), Spanish poet, literary critic, essayist, biographer
- Francesc Pi i Margall (1824–1901), romanticist writer who was briefly president of the short-lived First Spanish Republic
- Berta Piñán (born 1963), writer, poet, politician
- Francisco de Quevedo (1580–1645), novelist, essayist and poet, master of Conceptism
- Carme Riera (born 1948), novelist and essayist
- Mercedes Salisachs (1916–2014), writer
- Clara Sánchez (born 1955), writer
- Marta Sanz (born 1967), writer
- Enrique Tierno Galván (1918–1986), essayist and lawyer who served as Mayor of Madrid from 1979 to 1986
- Josefina de la Torre (1907–2002), writer
- Àxel Torres (born 1983), sports (football) journalist
- Maruja Torres (born 1943), journalist and writer
- Esther Tusquets (1936–2012), writer
- Miguel de Unamuno (1864–1936), Basque essayist, novelist, poet, playwright, philosopher, professor of Greek and Classics, and later rector at the University of Salamanca
- Ramón María del Valle-Inclán (1866–1936), radical dramatist, novelist and member of the Generation of '98
- Garcilaso de la Vega (1501–1536), Renaissance poet who was influential in introducing Italian Renaissance verse forms, poetic techniques, and themes to Spain
- "El Inca" Garcilaso de la Vega (1539–1616), born Gómez Suárez de Figueroa, first mestizo author in Spanish language, known for his chronicles of Inca history
- Félix Lope de Vega (1562–1635), one of the key literary figures of the Spanish Golden Age
- María Zambrano (1904–1991), writer and philosopher
- María de Zayas y Sotomayor (1590–1660), female novelist of the Spanish Golden Age, and one of the first Spanish feminist authors

== Military ==
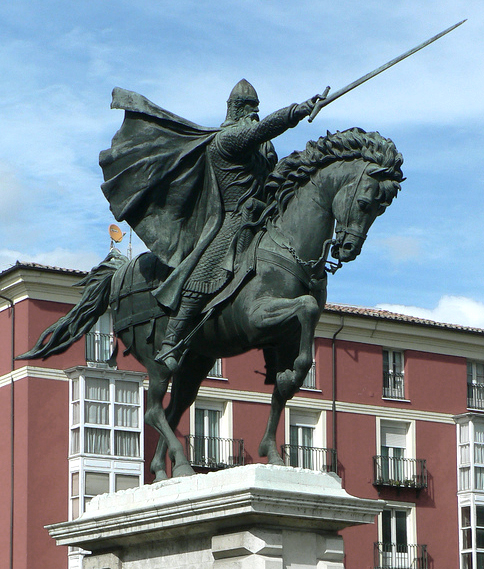
El Cid

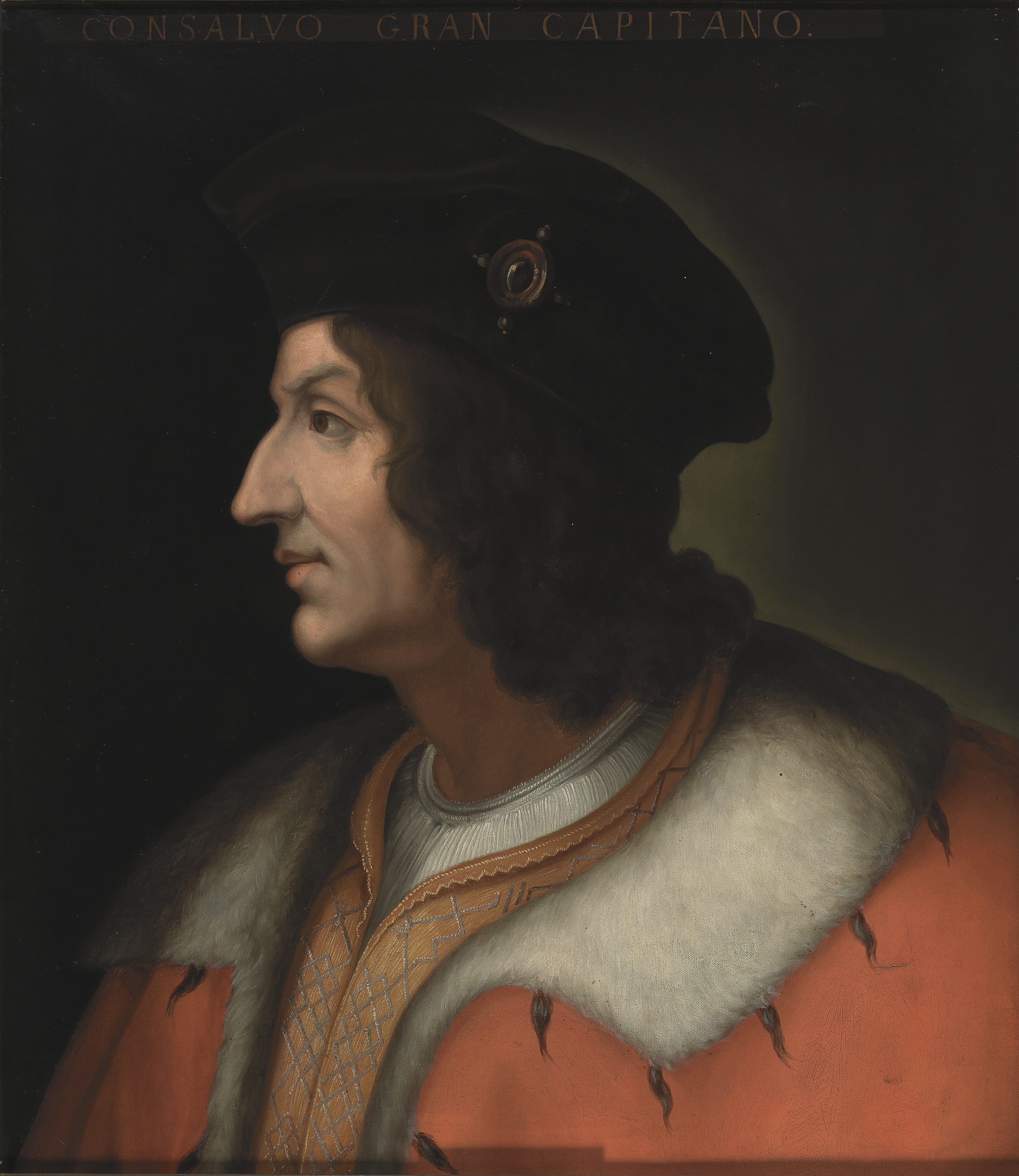
Gonzalo Fernández de Córdoba

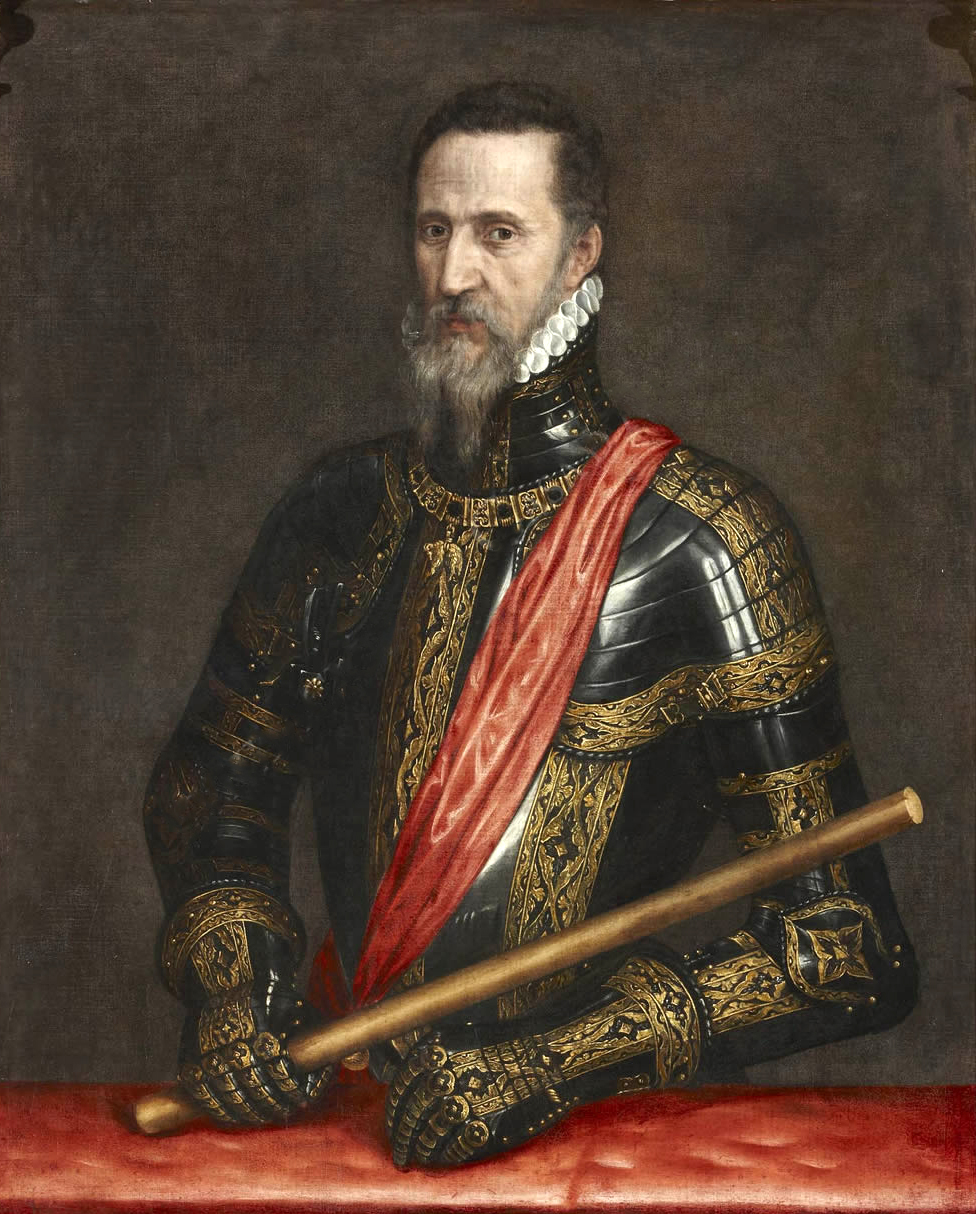
Fernando Álvarez de Toledo, 3rd Duke of Alba

- 3rd Duke of Alba (Fernando Álvarez de Toledo, 1507–1582), general and governor of the Spanish Netherlands (1567–1573)
- Diego García de Paredes (1466–1534), soldier and duellist, he never commanded an army or rose to the position of a general, but he was a notable figure in the wars, when personal prowess had still a considerable share in deciding combat.
- Diego de los Ríos (1850–1911) Spanish Governor-General of the Philippines
- Don Juan de Austria (1547–1578), general and admiral; defeated Müezzinzade Ali Pasha in the Battle of Lepanto (1571)
- Blas de Lezo (1687–1741), admiral; leading 6 warships and 3.700 men, defeated a British invasion force of 28.000 troops and 186 warships, during the Siege of Cartagena in 1741
- Álvaro de Bazán, 1st Marquis of Santa Cruz (1526–1588), admiral
- Francisco Javier Castaños, 1st Duke of Bailén (1758–1852), general; he defeated Dupont in the Battle of Bailén (1808)
- Blas Cerdeña (1792-1854), Spaniard militar naturalized as peruvian
- El Cid (Rodrigo 'Ruy' Díaz de Vivar, c. 1045–1099), knight and hero
- Gonzalo Fernández de Córdoba, "El Gran Capitán" (1453–1515), general and strategist of Early modern warfare
- Luis de Córdova y Córdova (1706– 1796), admiral. During the Anglo-Spanish War captured two merchant convoys totalling 79 ships.
- Cosme Damián Churruca (1761–1805), admiral
- Francisco Franco (1892–1975), general; from 1939 caudillo and formal Head of State of Spain
- Manuel Alberto Freire de Andrade y Armijo (1767–1835), Spanish cavalry officer and general officer during the Peninsular War, and later Defense Minister
- Bernardo de Gálvez (1746–1786), Field Marshal and governor of Louisiana, Spanish hero of the American Revolution
- Roque Guruceta (1771–1854), admiral
- Miguel Lobo y Malagamba (1821–1876), admiral
- Juan Martín Díez, "El Empecinado" (1775–1825), head of guerrilla bands promoted to Brigadier-General of cavalry during the Peninsular War
- Casto Méndez Núñez (1824–1869), admiral
- Pedro Navarro, Count of Oliveto (c. 1460–1528), prominent general
- Lina Ódena (1911–1936), communist and miliciana
- Álvaro de Navia Osorio y Vigil, Marqués de Santa Cruz de Marcenado, (1684–1732), general, author of the treatise Reflexiones Militares (Military Reflections)
- Pablo Morillo y Morillo (1775–1837), Count of Cartagena and Marquess of La Puerta, a.k.a. El Pacificador (The Peace Maker) was a Spanish general who fought in the napoleonic wars and hispanoamerican war of independence.
- Alexander Farnese, Duke of Parma (1545–1592), Spanish general and military governor of the Spanish Netherlands
- Francisco Pérez de Grandallana (1774–1841), brigadier of the Royal Spanish Navy
- Ambrosio Spinola, marqués de los Balbases (1569–1630), general
- Fernando Villaamil (1845–1898), naval officer, designer of the first destroyer

== Models ==
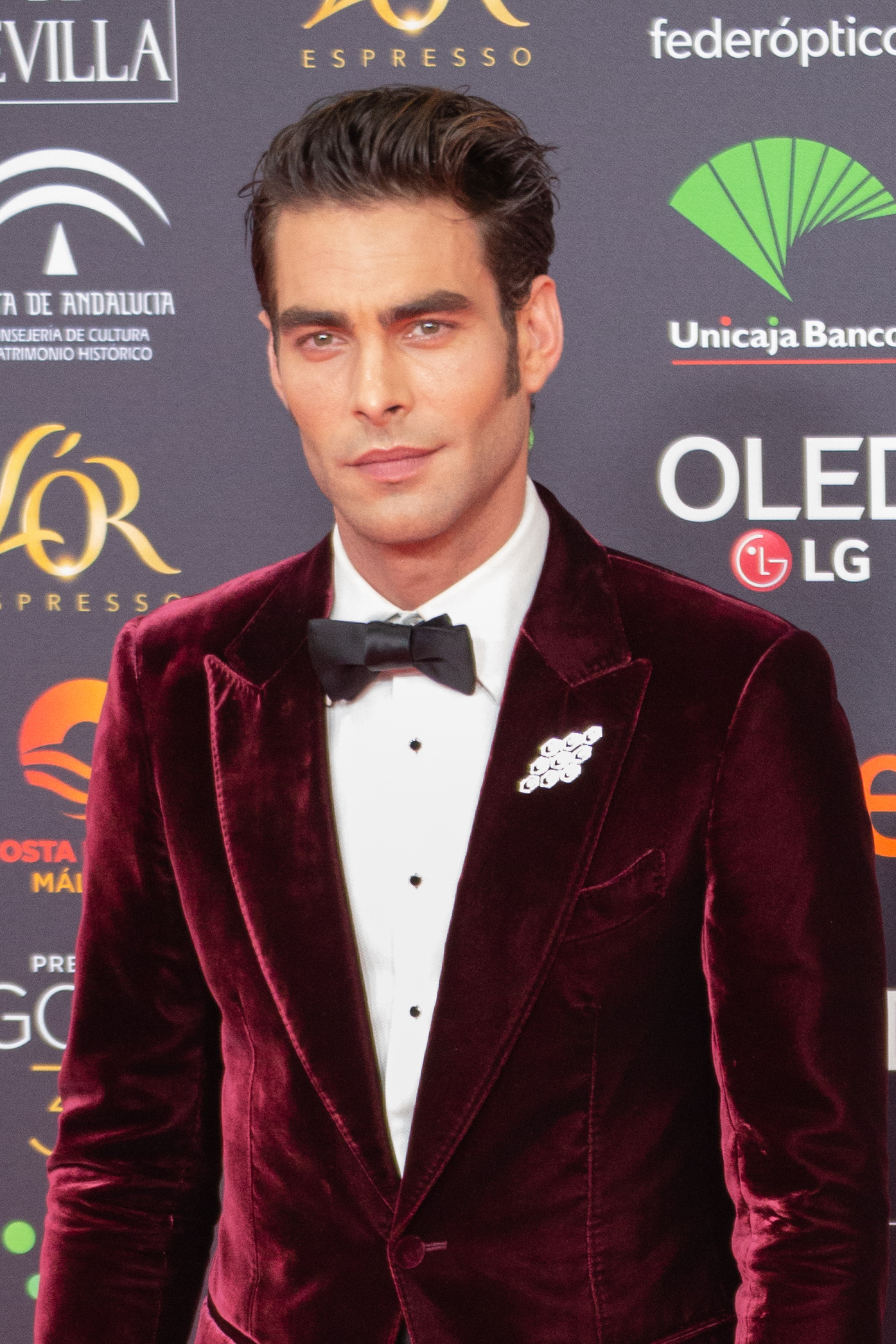
Jon Kortajarena

- Esther Cañadas (born 1977)
- Verónica Homs (born 1980)
- Jon Kortajarena (born 1985)
- Sheila Marquez (born 1985)
- Judit Mascó (born 1969)
- Blanca Padilla (born 1995)
- Marina Pérez (born 1984)
- Inés Sastre (born 1973)

== Musicians ==
=== Classical ===
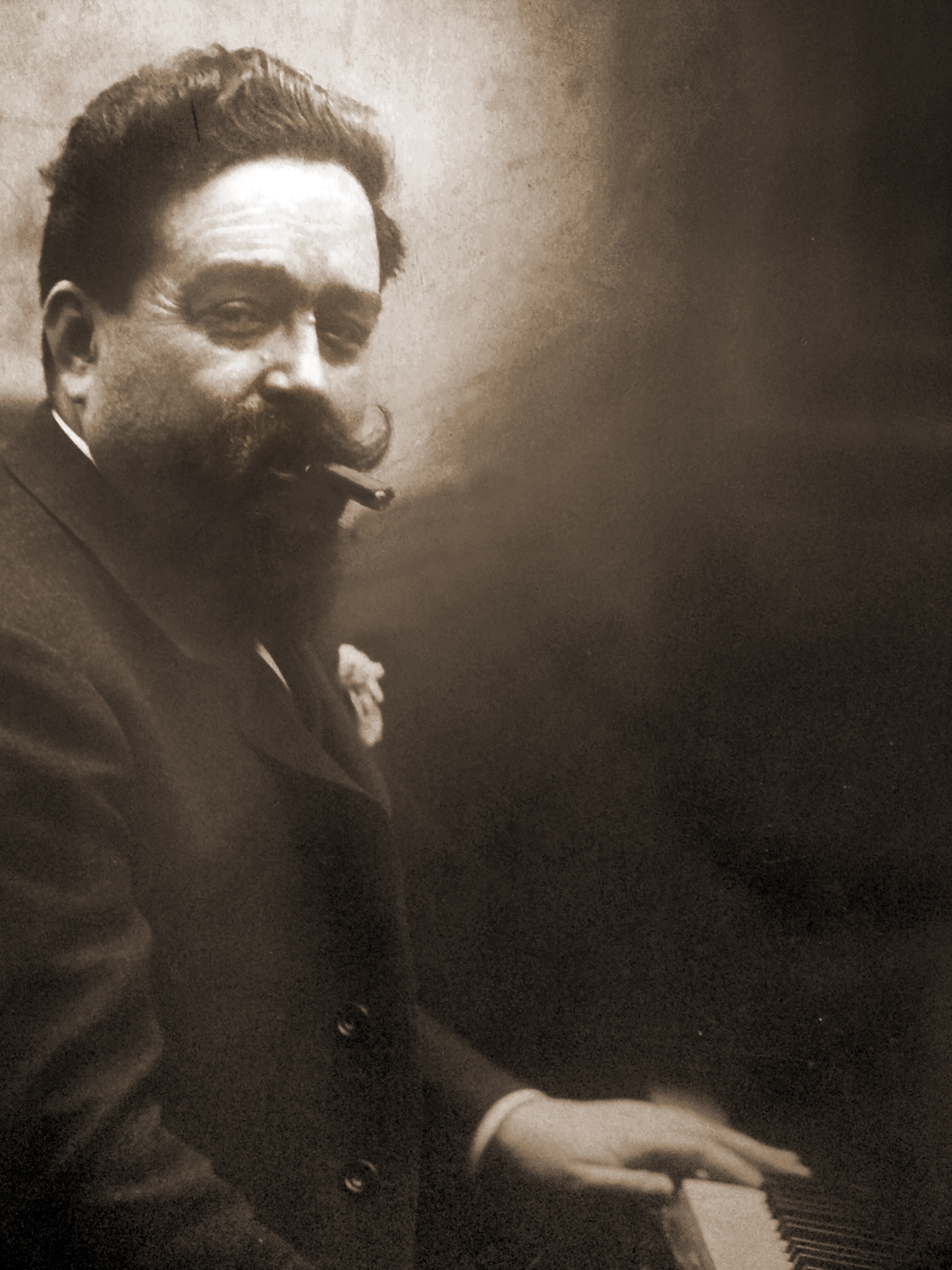
Isaac Albéniz

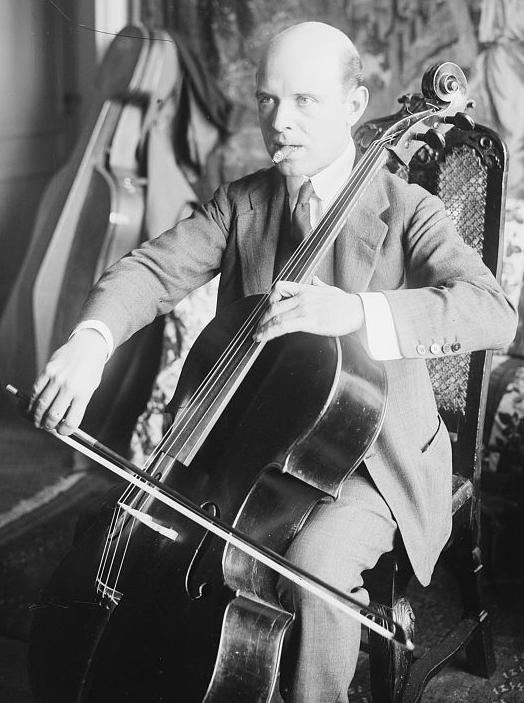
Pablo Casals

- Isaac Albéniz (1860–1909), composer
- Salvador Bacarisse (1898–1963), composer
- Luisa Lacal de Bracho (1874–1962), pianist, musicologist, and writer
- Pablo Casals (1876–1973), cello player and conductor
- Juan de Espinosa (d. 1528), composer and music theorist
- Manuel de Falla (1876–1946), composer
- Rafael Frühbeck de Burgos (1933–2014), conductor
- Enrique Granados (1867–1916), composer
- Enrique Jordá (1911–1996), conductor, music director of the San Francisco Symphony (1954–1963)
- Francisco Lara (born 1968), composer and conductor
- Alicia de Larrocha (1923–2009), pianist
- Vicente Martín y Soler (1754–1806), composer
- Sofía Noel (1915–2011), Belgian-born soprano and ethnomusicologist
- Luis de Pablo (1930–2021), composer
- Blas de Laserna, composer
- María Teresa Oller (1920–2018), composer and folklorist
- Eugenia Osterberger (1852–1932), Galician pianist and composer
- Joaquín Rodrigo (1901–1999), composer and pianist, known for his Concierto de Aranjuez
- Gaspar Sanz (1640–1710), composer, dominate figure of Spanish baroque music
- Jordi Savall (born 1941), early and baroque music conductor and viol player
- Andrés Segovia (1893–1987), classical guitarist
- Ángel Sola (1859–1910), bandurrista
- Antonio Soler (1729–1783), composer, known for his harpsichord sonatas
- Francisco Tárrega (1852–1909), composer and classical guitarist
- Joaquín Turina (1882–1949), composer
- Tomás Luis de Victoria (1548–1611), most famous composer of the 16th century (late Renaissance) in Spain
- Paco de Lucía (1947–2014), flamenco guitarist and composer; regarded as one of the finest guitarists in the world and the greatest living guitarist of the flamenco genre

=== Opera singers ===
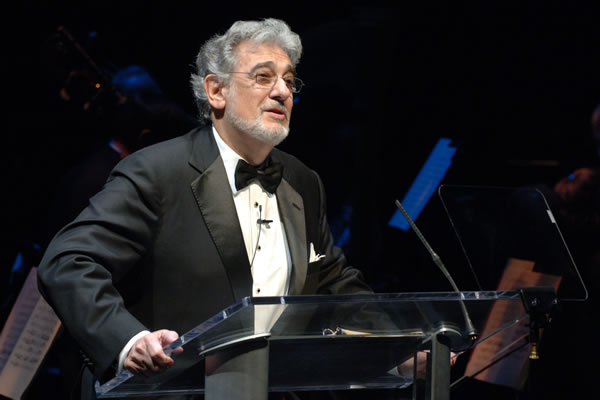
Plácido Domingo

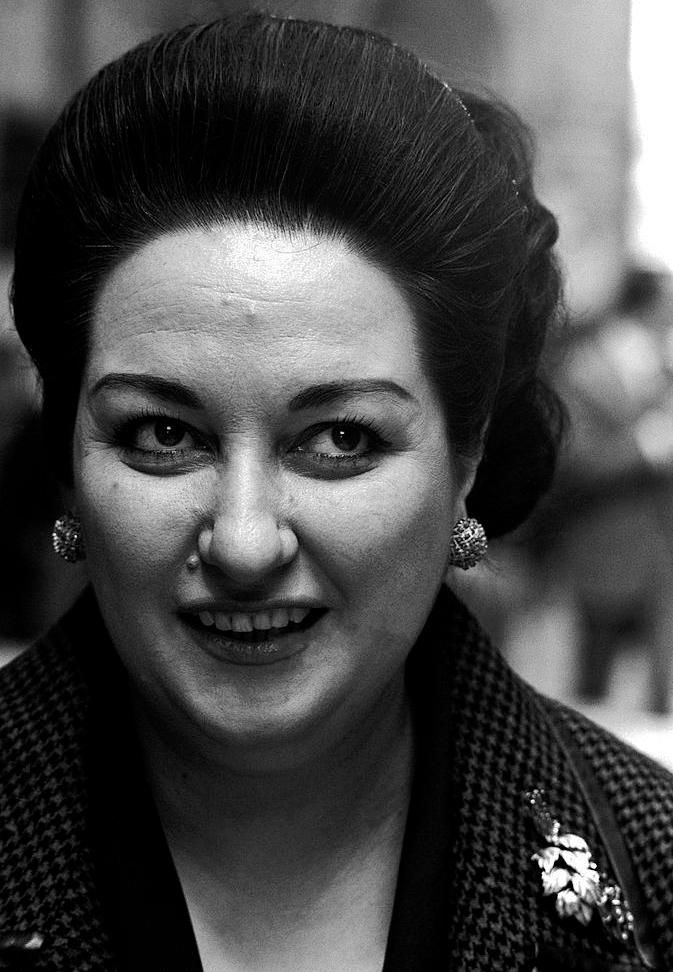
Montserrat Caballé

- Victoria de los Ángeles (1923–2005), soprano
- Maite Arruabarrena (born 1964), mezzo-soprano
- Ainhoa Arteta (born 1964), soprano
- Teresa Berganza (1935–2022), mezzo-soprano
- Montserrat Caballé (1933–2018), soprano
- Avelina Carrera (1871–1939), soprano from Barcelona
- Nancy Fabiola Herrera (born 19??), mezzo-soprano
- José Carreras (born 1946), one of The Three Tenors
- Antonio Cortis (1891–1952), tenor
- Plácido Domingo (born 1941), one of The Three Tenors
- Manuel del Pópulo Vicente García (1775–1832), tenor
- María Gay (1879–1943), mezzo-soprano
- Alfredo Kraus (1927–1999), tenor
- Hipólito Lázaro (1887–1974), tenor
- Carlos Marín (1968-2021), baritone, member of operatic quartet Il Divo
- María José Montiel (born 1968), mezzo-soprano
- María Orán (1943–2018), soprano
- Adelina Patti (1843–1919), coloratura soprano
- Conchita Supervía (1895–1936), mezzo-soprano
- Francisco Viñas (1863–1933), tenor

=== Singers ===
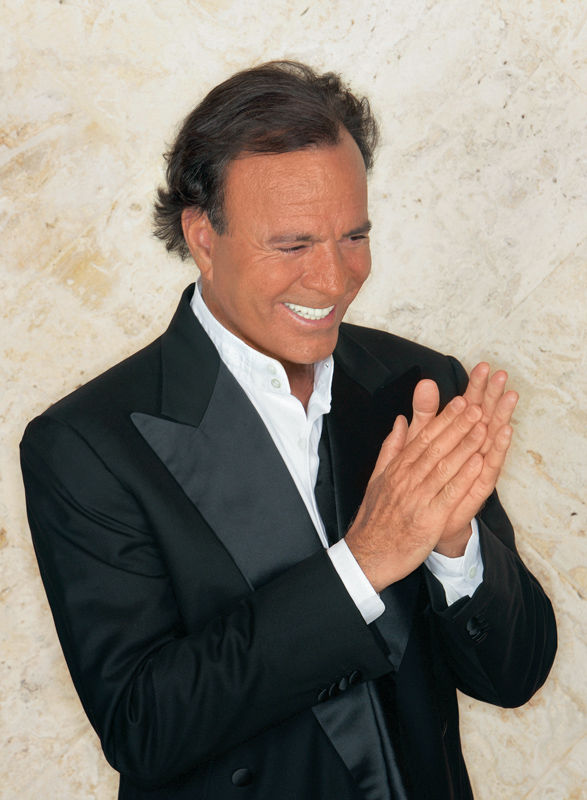
Julio Iglesias

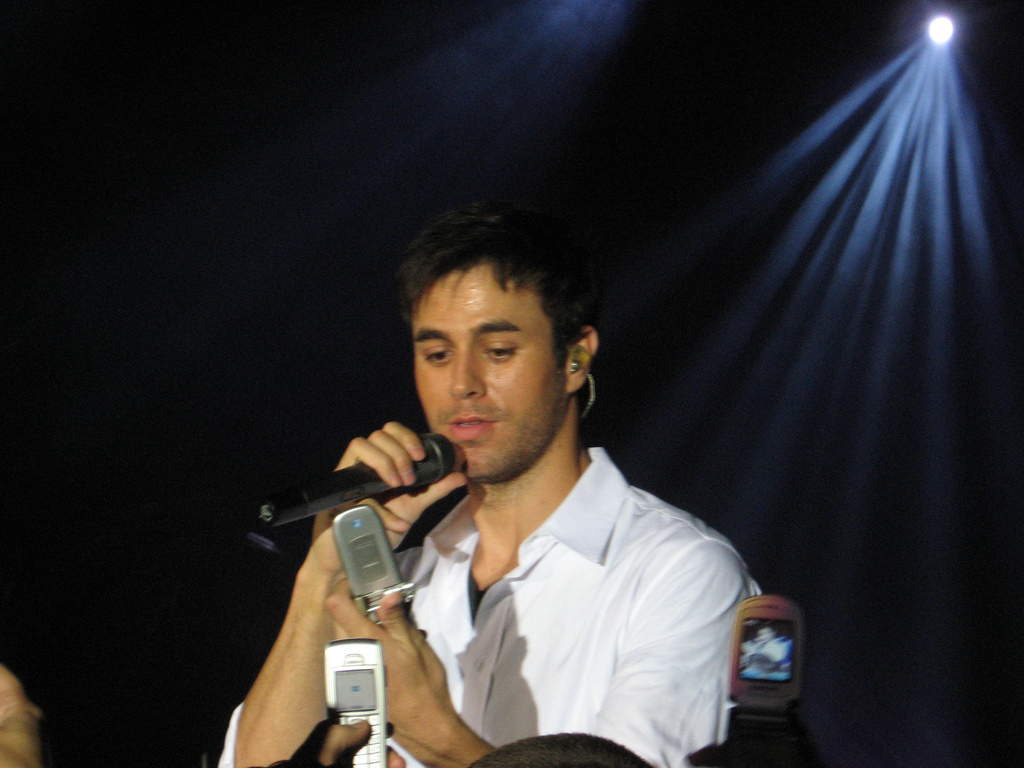
Enrique Iglesias

- Edward Aguilera (born 1976), Menudo singer
- Dolores Agujetas (born 1960), flamenco singer
- Alaska (born 1963), pop-rock singer
- Pablo Alborán (born 1989), singer
- Eva Amaral (born 1972), pop and folk rock singer
- Ana Belén (born 1951), singer and actress
- David Bisbal (born 1979), singer-songwriter
- Miguel Bosé (born 1956), pop singer
- Nino Bravo (1944–1973), singer
- Camarón de la Isla (1950–1992), flamenco singer, real name José Monje Cruz
- Luz Casal (born 1958), pop singer
- Estrellita Castro (1908–1983), singer and actress
- Montse Cortés (born 1972), flamenco singer
- Rocío Dúrcal (1944–2006), singer
- Manolo Escobar (1931–2013), singer
- Manolo García (born 1955), singer-songwriter
- Enrique Iglesias (born 1975), pop singer
- Julio Iglesias (born 1943), singer
- Antonio José (born 1995), singer
- Rocío Jurado (1946–2006), singer
- Gloria Lasso (1922–2005), singer
- Lola Flores (1923–1995), singer and flamenco dancer
- Lolita Flores (born 1958), singer and actress
- Dani Martín (born 1977), singer
- Víctor Manuel (born 1947), singer
- Shakira (born 1977), singer
- Abraham Mateo (born 1998), singer
- Alba Molina (born 1978), Flamenco singer
- Amaia Montero (born 1976) pop singer
- Lola Montes, (1898-1983), Spanish singer
- Sara Montiel (1928–2013), singer and actress, real name María Antonia Abad
- Carlos Núñez (born 1971), bagpipes and Galician (Celtic) music performer
- Aitana Ocaña Morales (born 1999), spanish singer-songwriter
- Amaia Romero (born 1999), Spanish singer-songwriter
- Paloma San Basilio, singer
- Jordi Savall (born 1941), film music composer
- José Luis Perales (born 1945), singer
- Camilo Sesto (1946–2019), singer
- Isabel Pantoja (born 1956), singer
- Niña Pastori, (born María Rosa García García in 1978), flamenco singer
- José Luis Perales (born 1945), singer
- Raphael (born 1943), pop singer
- Rosalía (born 1992), singer-songwriter
- Joaquín Sabina (born 1949), singer-songwriter
- Marta Sanchez (born 1966), singer-songwriter
- Alejandro Sanz (born 1968), pop singer
- Joan Manuel Serrat (born 1943), Catalan singer-songwriter
- Chanel Terrero (born 1991), singer
- Ana Torroja (born 1959), pop rock singer
- Enrique Urquijo (1960–1999), founder of the band Los Secretos with his brother Álvaro, lead voice and composer

== Philosophers and humanists ==
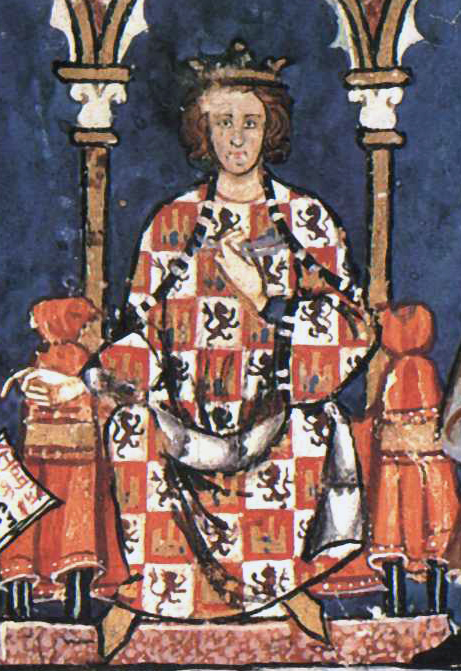
Alfonso X of Castile

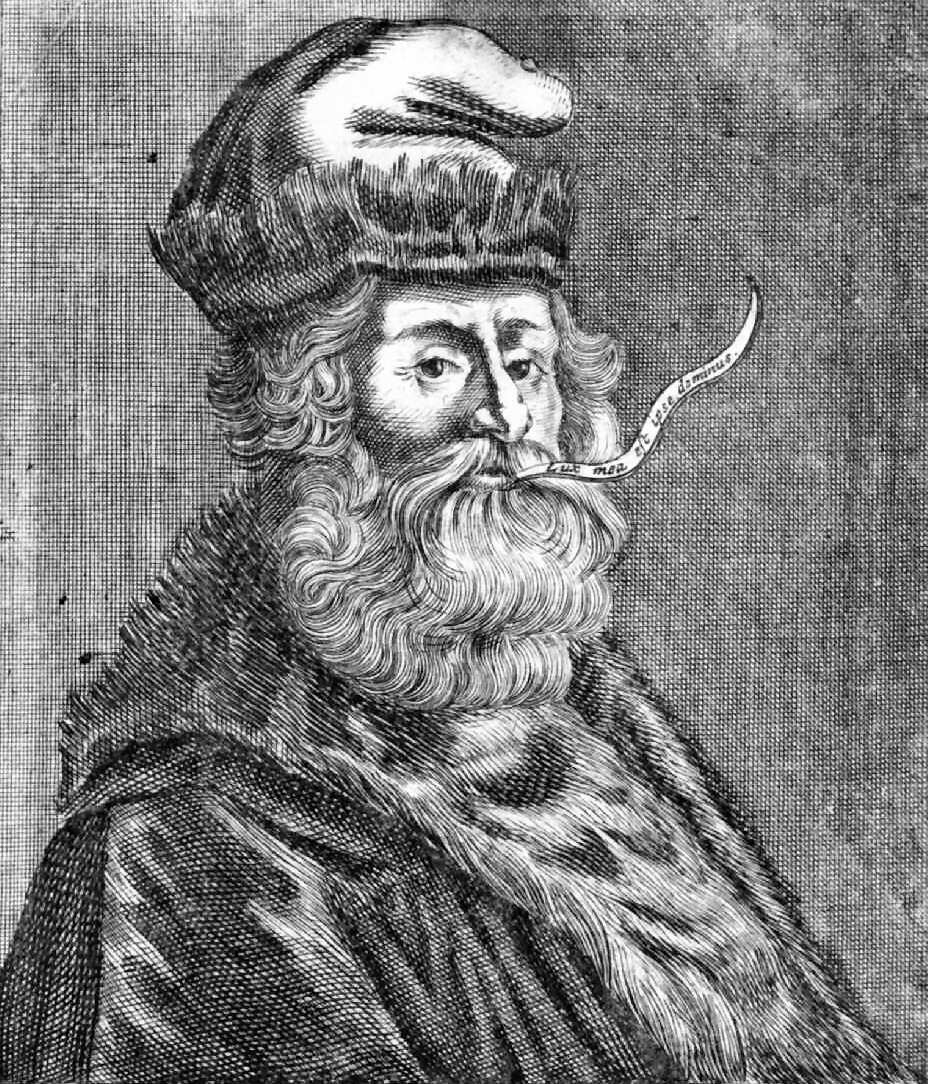
Ramon Llull

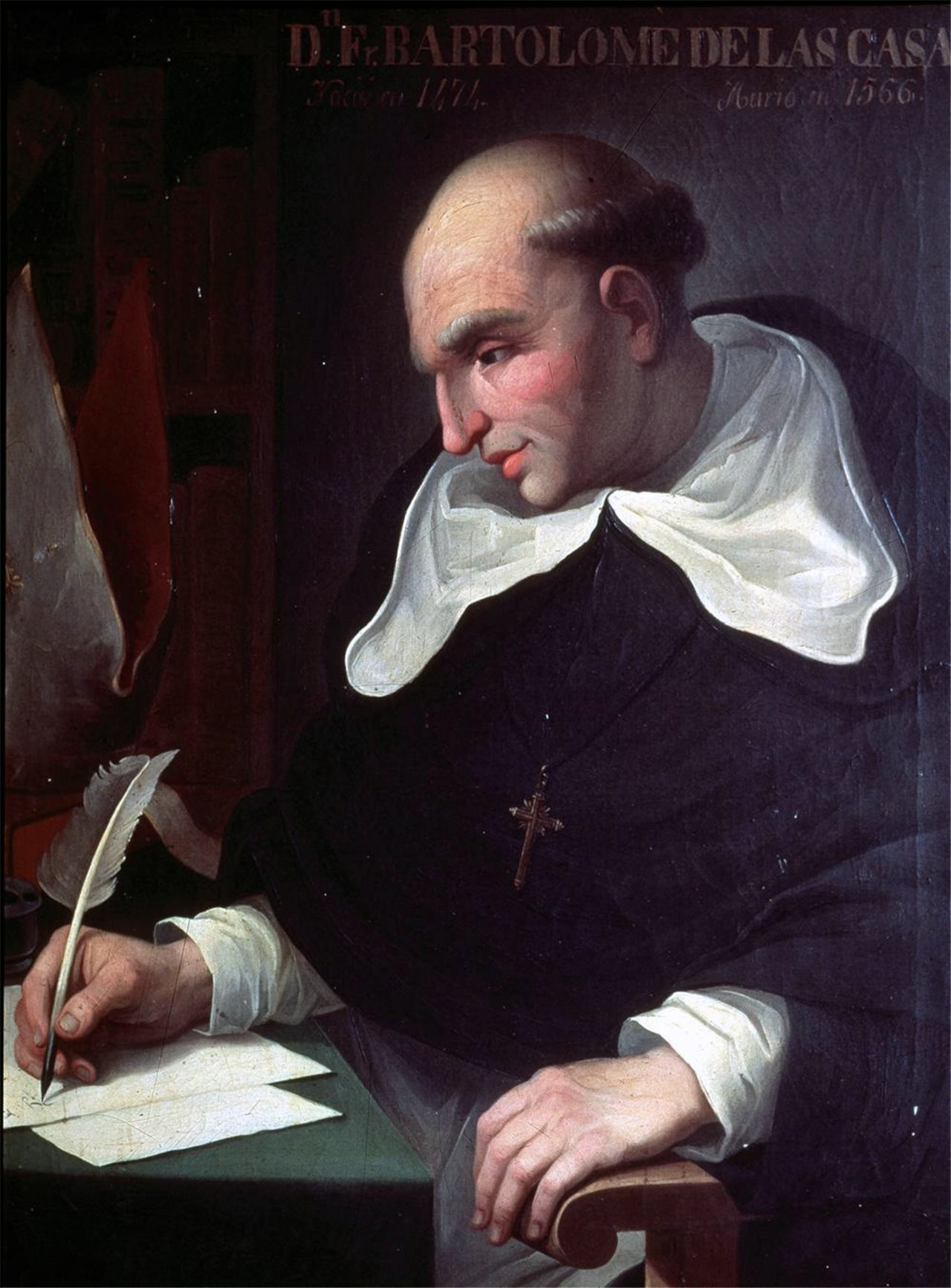
Bartolomé de Las Casas

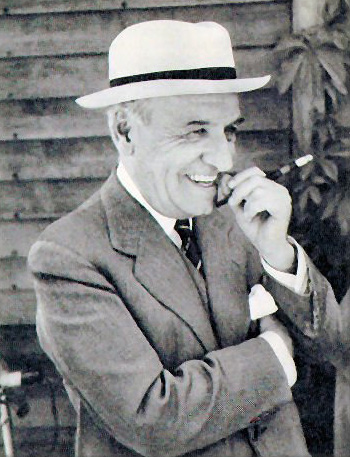
José Ortega y Gasset

- Alfonso X of Castile (1221–1284), "El Sabio" ("The Wise")
- Francisco de Enzinas (1518–1552), humanist and translator of the New Testament
- Francisco Giner de los Ríos (1839–1915), philosopher, educator and one of the most influential Spanish intellectuals at the end of the 19th and the beginning of the 20th century.
- Baltasar Gracián (1601–1658), author of El Criticón, influenced European philosophers such as Schopenhauer
- Bartolomé de Las Casas (1484–1566), humanist, advocate of the rights of Native Americans
- Ramon Llull (1232–1315), philosopher, theologian, poet, missionary, and Christian apologist from the Kingdom of Majorca. Inventor of a philosophical system known as the Art and a precursor of the computer, pioneer of computation theory.
- Salvador de Madariaga (1886–1978), humanist, co-founder of the College of Europe (1949)
- Gregorio Marañón (1887–1960), humanist and medical scientist, important intellectual of the 20th century in Spain
- Marcelino Menéndez Pelayo (1856–1912), philologist, historian and erudite
- Julián Marías (1914–2005), philosopher; wrote the History of Philosophy
- Ramón Menéndez Pidal (1869–1968), philologist, historian and erudite member of Generation of '98
- Antonio de Nebrija (1441–1522), scholar, published the first grammar of the Spanish language (Gramática Castellana, 1492), which was the first grammar produced of any Romance language
- Rocío Orsi (1976–2014), philosopher, professor
- José Ortega y Gasset (1883–1955), philosopher, social and political thinker, author of The Revolt of the Masses (1930)
- Bernardino de Sahagún (1499–1590), Franciscan missionary, researched Nahua culture and Nahuatl language and compiled an unparalleled work in Spanish and Náhuatl
- George Santayana (1863–1952), philosopher, taught at Harvard, author of The Sense of Beauty (1896) and The Life of Reason (1905–1906)
- Fernando Savater (born 1947), philosopher and essayist, known for his writings on ethics
- Francisco Suárez (1548–1617), one of the most influential scholastics after Thomas Aquinas
- Miguel de Unamuno (1864–1936), existentialist writer and literary theoretician
- Juan Luis Vives (1492–1540), prominent figure of Renaissance humanism, taught at Leuven and Oxford (while tutor to Mary Tudor)
- Xavier Zubiri (1898–1983), philosopher, critic of classical metaphysics

== Religion ==
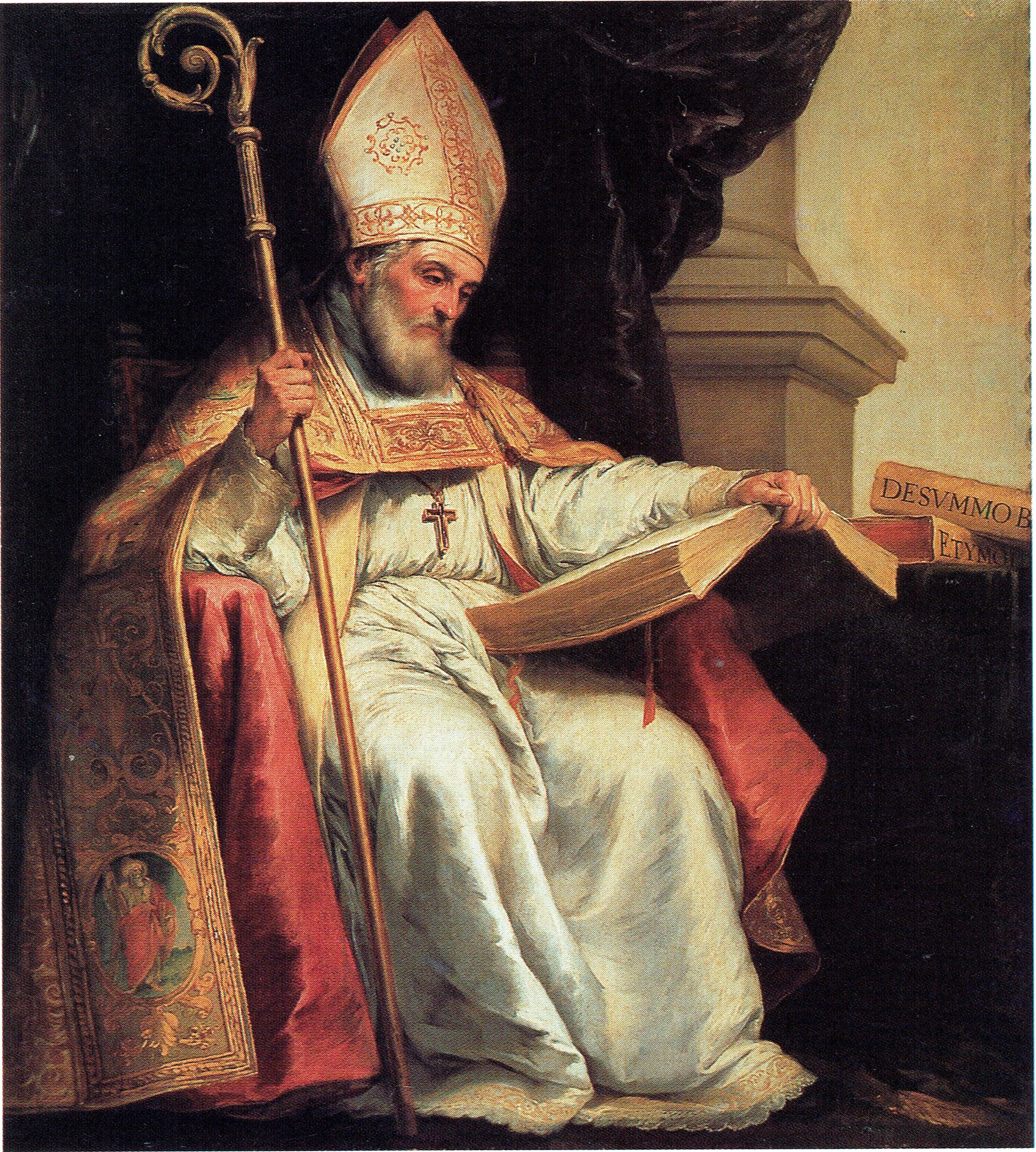
Isidore of Seville

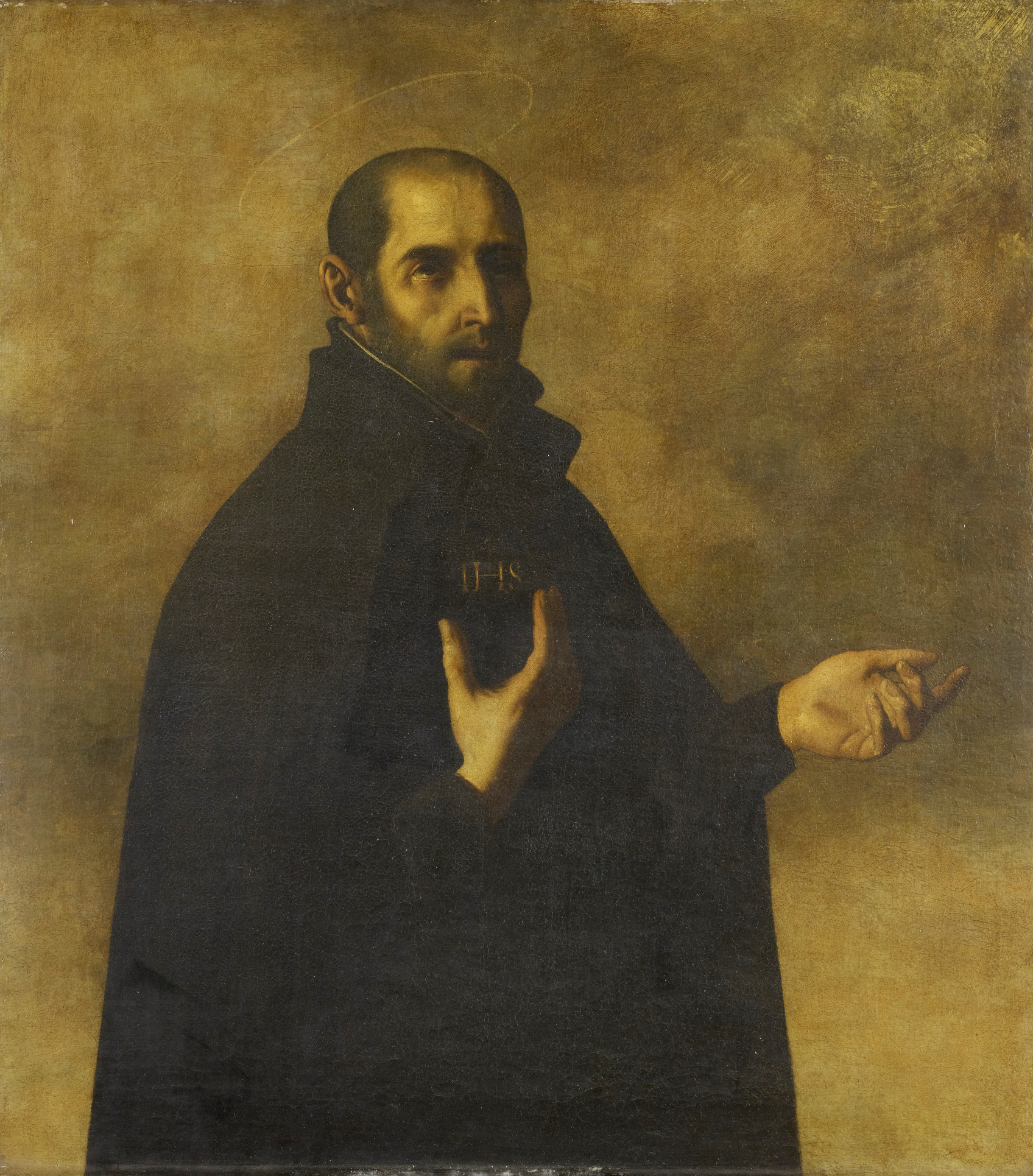
St Ignatius of Loyola

- Maria Pilar Bruguera Sábat (1906–1994), Roman Catholic nun and physician
- Francisco Jiménez de Cisneros (1436–1517), religious reformer, bishop, cardinal and statesman
- St Dominic of Guzmán (1170–1221), founder of the Order of Preachers
- St Isidore of Seville (c. 560–636), bishop, humanist and doctor of the Church
- St Ignatius of Loyola (1491–1556), founder of the Society of Jesus
- St John of Avila (1500–1569), priest, preacher, theologian and mystic
- St John of the Cross (1542–1591), mystic and monastic reformer, doctor of the Church
- Saints Nunilo and Alodia (died c. 842/51), child martyrs
- Vicente Enrique y Tarancón (1907–1994), bishop, cardinal and president of the Spanish Episcopal Conference
- St Teresa of Avila (1515–1582), mystic and monastic reformer, doctor of the Church
- Tomás de Torquemada (1420–1498), Grand Inquisitor
- St Joaquina Vedruna (1783–1854), founder of the Carmelite Sisters of the Charity
- St Vincent Martyr (died c. 304), deacon martyr
- St. Toribio de Mogrovejo (1538–1606), prelate of the Catholic Church who served as the Archbishop of Lima from 1579 until his death
- St Francis Xavier (1506–1552), missionary and co-founder of the Society of Jesus
- Peter of Saint Joseph Betancur (1626–1667), missionary in Guatemala
- José de Anchieta (1534–1597), missionary in Brazil; founder of city São Paulo and co-founder of city Rio de Janeiro
- Bernardo de Alderete (1565–1641), canon of the Mosque-Cathedral of Córdoba
- Ángela María de la Concepción (1649-1690), nun, mystical writer, and reformer; founder of Monasterio de las trinitarias de El Toboso and of the Trinitarias contemplativas

== Science and technology ==
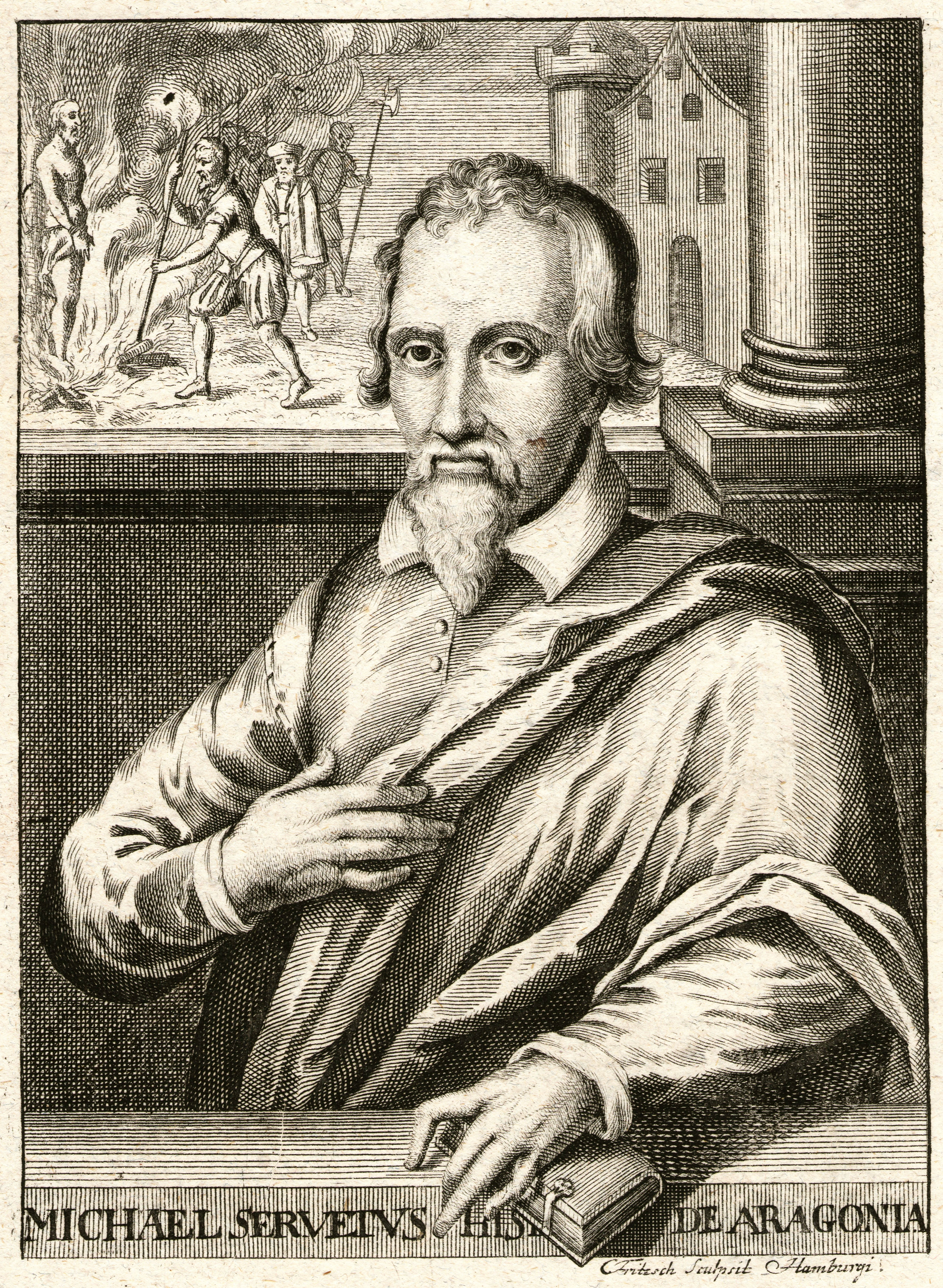
Michael Servetus

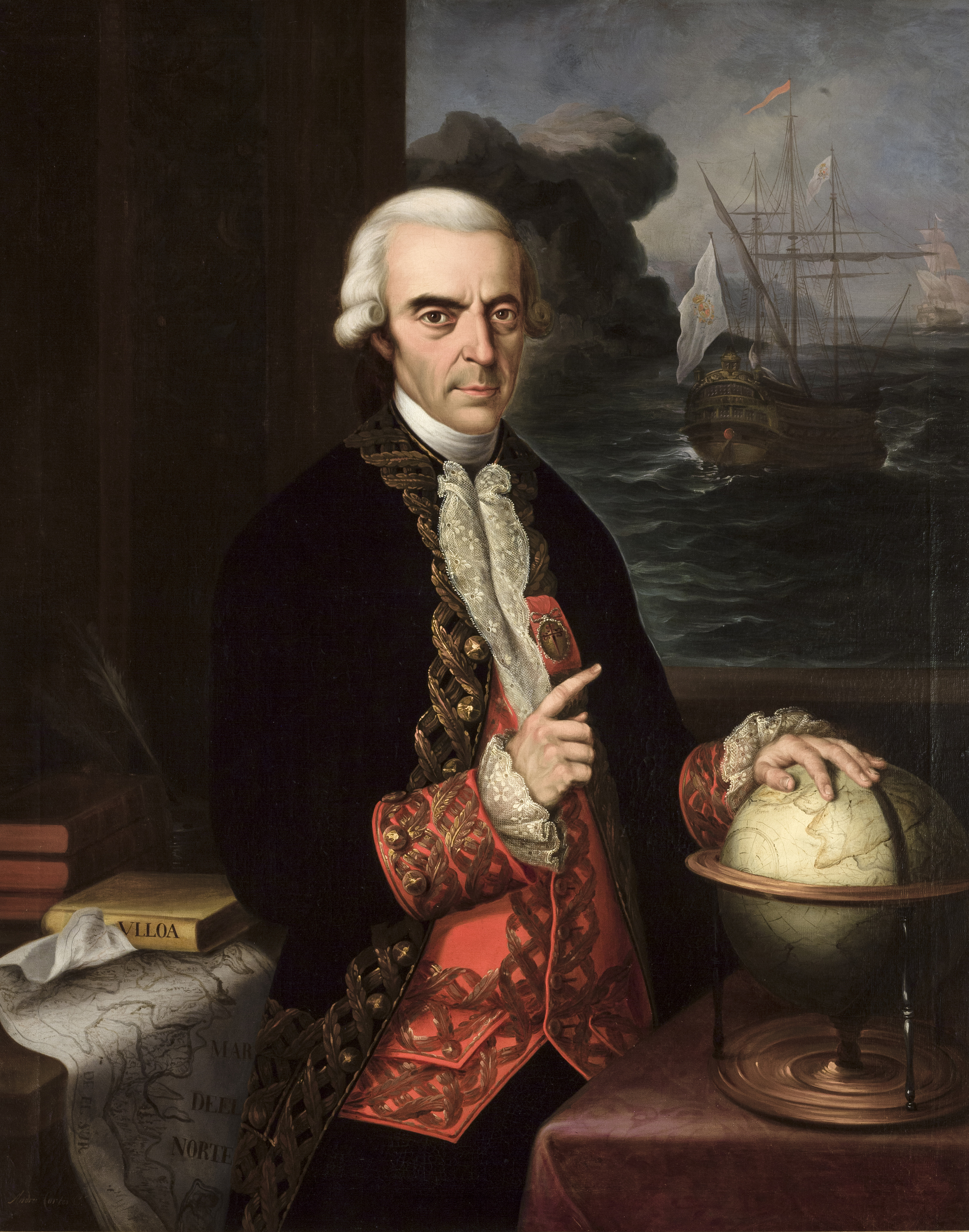
Antonio de Ulloa

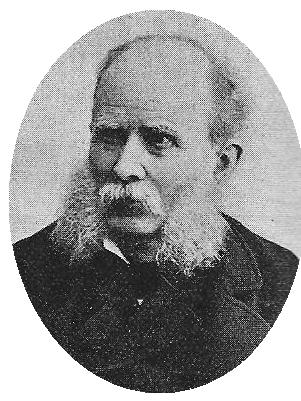
Narcís Monturiol

Santiago Ramón y Cajal

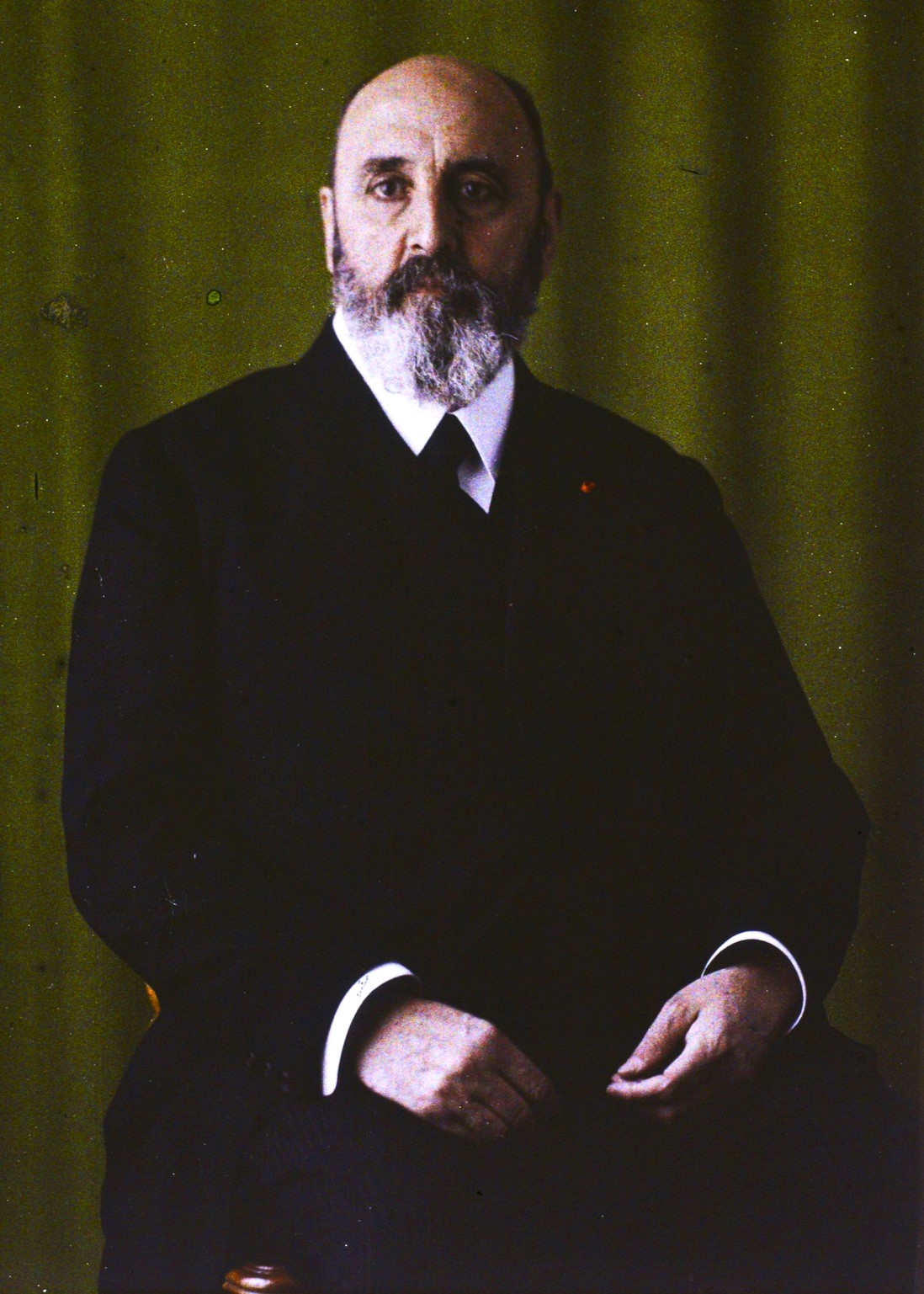
Leonardo Torres Quevedo

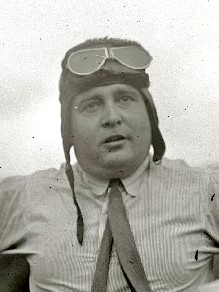
Juan de la Cierva

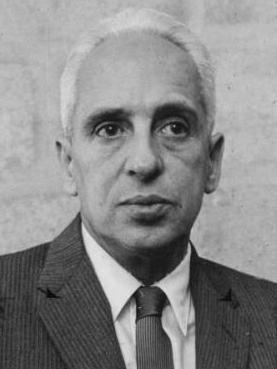
Severo Ochoa

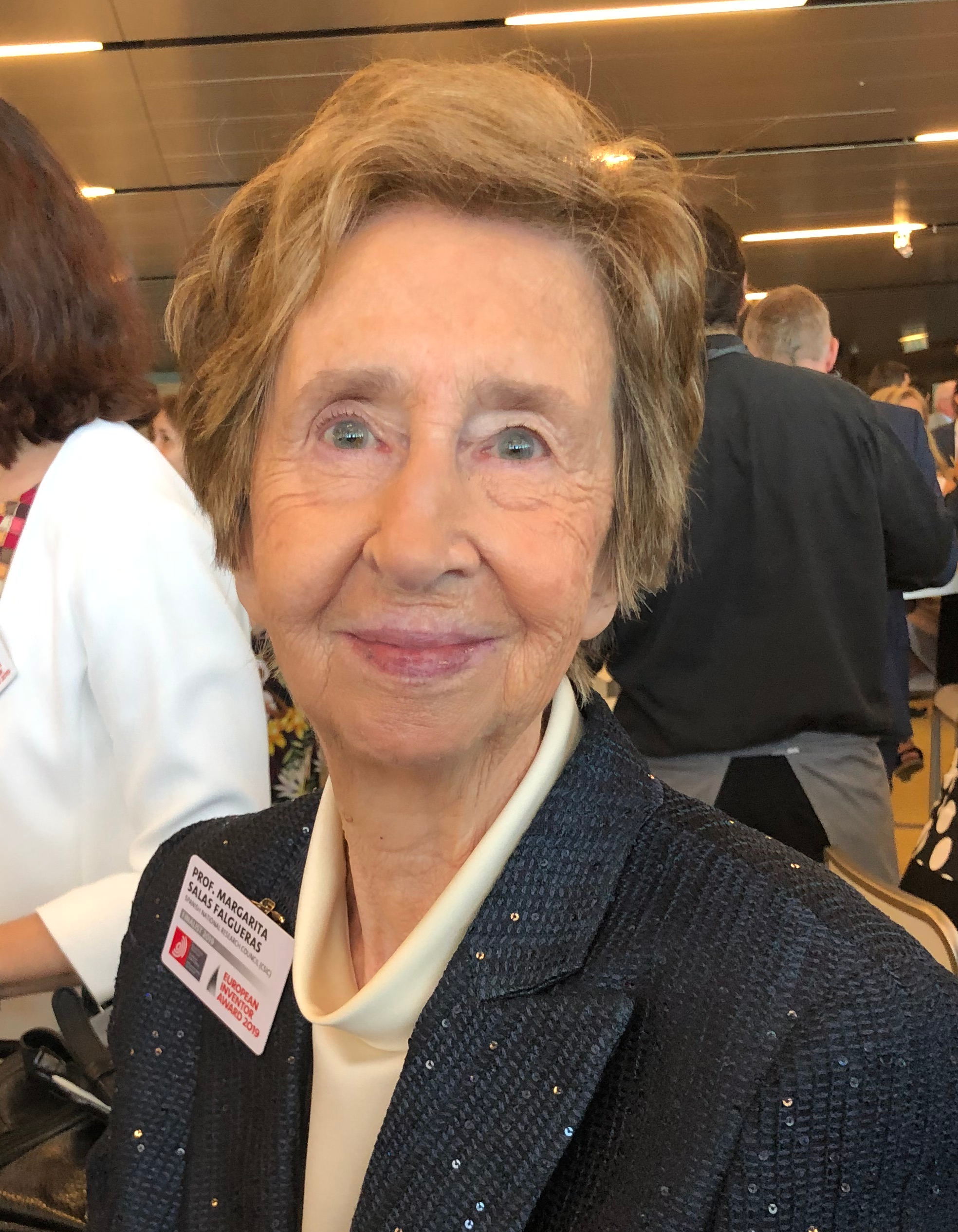
Margarita Salas

- José de Acosta (1540–1600), one of the first naturalists and anthropologists of the Americas
- Alex Aguilar (born 1957), professor of Animal Biology at the University of Barcelona
- Susana Agustí (graduated 1982), biological oceanographer, educator
- José María Algué (1856–1930), meteorologist, inventor of the barocyclometer, the nephoscope, and the microseismograph
- Rafael Alvarado Ballester (1924–2001)
- Jerónimo de Ayanz y Beaumont (1553–1613), registered design for steam-powered water pump for use in mines (1606)
- Francisco Javier de Balmis (1753–1819), physician, leader of the first international vaccination campaign in history
- Ignacio Barraquer (1884–1965), leading ophthalmologist, pioneer of cataract surgery
- José Ignacio Barraquer (1916–1998), leading ophthalmologist, father of modern refractive surgery; invented the microkeratome and the cryolathe, developed the surgical procedures of keratomileusis and keratophakia
- Agustín de Betancourt (1758–1824), engineer, worked in many rangs from steam engines and balloons to structural engineering and supervised the planning and construction of Saint Petersburg, Kronstadt, Nizhny Novgorod, and other Russian cities
- Pino Caballero Gil (born 1968), computer scientist
- Ángel Cabrera (1879–1960), naturalist, investigated South American fauna
- Blas Cabrera (1878–1945), physicist, worked in the domain of experimental physics with focus in the magnetic properties of matter
- Nicolás Cabrera (1913–1989), physicist, did important work on the theories of crystal growth and the oxidisation of metals
- Santiago Calatrava (born 1951), architect, sculptor and structural engineer
- Pedro Carlos Cavadas Rodríguez (born 1965), pioneering surgeon
- Juan de la Cierva (1895–1936), aeronautical engineer, pioneer of flying with rotary wings, inventor of the autogyro
- Juan Ignacio Cirac Sasturain (born 1965), one of the pioneers of the field of quantum computing and quantum information theory
- Josep Comas i Solà (1868–1937), astronomer, discovered the periodic comet 32P/Comas Solá and 11 asteroids, and in 1907 observed limb darkening of Saturn's moon Titan (the first evidence that the body had an atmosphere)
- Jerónimo Cortés (c. 1560 - c. 1611), mathematician, astronomer, naturalist and Valencian compiler
- Carmen Domínguez (born 1969), glaciologist
- Pedro Duque (born 1963), astronaut and veteran of two space missions
- Fausto de Elhúyar (1755–1833), chemist, joint discoverer of tungsten with his brother Juan José de Elhúyar in 1783
- Cosme García Sáez (1818–1874), inventor and submarine poioneer
- Bernardo Hernández (born 1970), entrepreneur, leading figure in technology
- Francisco Hernández (1514–1587), botanicist, carried out important research about the Mexican flora
- Jorge Juan y Santacilia (1713–1773), mathematician and naval officer. Determined that the Earth is not perfectly spherical but is oblat. Also measured the heights of the Andes mountains using a barometer.
- Carlos Jiménez Díaz (1898–1967), doctor and researcher, leading figure in pathology
- Asunción Linares (1921–2005), paleontologist
- Gregorio Marañón (1887–1960), doctor and researcher, leading figure in endocrinology
- Rafael Mas Hernández (1950–2003), geographer
- Narcís Monturiol (1819–1885), physicist and inventor, pioneer of underwater navigation and first machine-powered submarine
- José Celestino Bruno Mutis (1732–1808), botanicist, doctor, philosopher and mathematician, carried out relevant research about the American flora, founded one of the first astronomic observatories in America (1762)
- Severo Ochoa (1905–1993), doctor and biochemist, achieved the synthesis of ribonucleic acid (RNA), Nobel prize laureate (1959)
- Mateu Orfila (1787–1853), doctor and chemist, father of modern toxicology, leading figure in forensic toxicology
- Joan Oró (1923–2004), biochemist, carried out important research about the origin of life, he worked with NASA on the Viking missions
- Isaac Peral (1851–1895), engineer and sailor, designer of the first fully operative military submarine
- Santiago Ramón y Cajal (1852–1934), father of Neuroscience, Nobel prize laureate (1906)
- Julio Rey Pastor (1888–1962), mathematician, leading figure in geometry
- Wifredo Ricart (1897–1974), engineer, designer and executive manager in the automotive industry
- Andrés Manuel del Río (1764–1849), geologist and chemist, discovered vanadium (as vanadinite) in 1801
- Pío del Río Hortega (1882–1945), neuroscientist, discoverer of the microglia or Hortega cell
- Josef de Mendoza y Ríos (1761–1816) was a Spanish astronomer and mathematician of the 18th century, famous for his work on navigation.
- Félix Rodríguez de la Fuente (1928–1980), naturalist, leading figure in ornithology, ethology, ecology and science divulgation
- Enrique Rojas Montes (born 1949)
- Margarita Salas (1938–2019), biochemist, molecular geneticist and researcher
- Miguel Sarrias Domingo (1930–2002) was medical director of the Institut Guttmann in Barcelona.
- Miguel Servet (1511–1553), scientist, surgeon and humanist; first European to describe pulmonary circulation
- María Dolores Soria (1948–2004), paleontologist, researcher, professor, and biologist
- Esteban Terradas i Illa (1883–1950), mathematician, physicist and engineer
- Leonardo Torres Quevedo (1852–1936), engineer and computer scientist, pioneer of automated calculation machines, inventor of El Ajedrecista, pioneer of radio control, designer of the three-lobed non-rigid Astra-Torres airship and the funicular over the Niagara Falls
- Eduardo Torroja (1899–1961), civil engineer, structural architect, world-famous specialist in concrete structures
- Josep Trueta (1897–1977), doctor, his new method for treatment of open wounds and fractures helped save many lives during World War II
- Antonio de Ulloa (1716–1795), scientist, soldier and author; joint discoverer of element platinum with Jorge Juan y Santacilia (1713–1773)
- Arnold of Villanova (c. 1235–1311), alchemist and physician, he discovered carbon monoxide and pure alcohol

== Social scientists ==
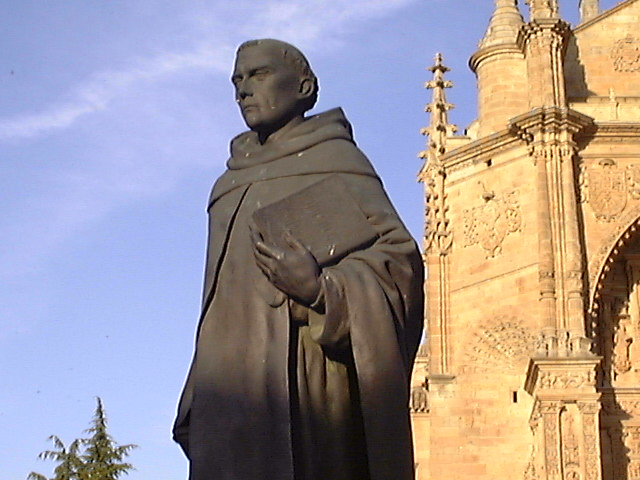
Francisco de Vitoria

- Gurutzi Arregi (1936–2020), Basque ethnographer
- Martín de Azpilicueta (1492–1586), economist, member of the School of Salamanca, precursor of the quantitative theory of money
- Mercedes Bengoechea (born 1952), feminist sociolinguist, professor
- Agustín Blánquez Fraile (1883–1965], historian and latinist
- Manuel Castells (born 1942), sociologist, author of trilogy The Information Age
- María Ángeles Durán (born 1942), sociologist and economist
- Manuel Fernández López (1947–2014)
- Salvador Giner (1934–2019), sociologist, he had researched on social theory, sociology of culture and modern industrial society
- Jesús Huerta de Soto (born 1956), major Austrian School economist
- Juan José Linz (1926–2013), Sterling Professor of Political and Social Science at Yale; Prince of Asturias Award (1987) and Johan Skytte Prize (1996) laureate
- Pilar Acosta Martínez (1938–2006), prehistorian and archeologist
- Patricia Mayayo (born 1967), art historian
- Claudio Sánchez-Albornoz (1893–1984), historian, prominent specialist in medieval Spanish history
- Juan Uría Ríu (1891–1979), historian
- Joseph de la Vega (1650–1692), businessman, wrote Confusion of Confusions (1688), first book on stock markets
- Francisco de Vitoria (c. 1480/86–1546), member of the School of Salamanca, precursor of international law theory

== Sports ==
=== Athletics ===
- Ruth Beitia, (born 1979), women's high jump gold medalist at the 2016 Olympics
- Fermín Cacho Ruiz (born 1969), 1500 metres gold (1992 Olympics) and silver (1996 Olympics) medalist
- Daniel Plaza, 20 km race walk gold medalist (1992 Olympics)

=== Basketball ===
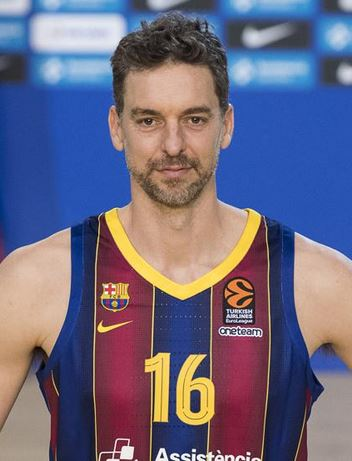
Pau Gasol

- Ariadna Chueca Moreno (born 1991), FIBA basketball referee
- Antonio Díaz-Miguel (1933–2000), coach, enshrined in the Basketball Hall of Fame in 1997
- Pau Gasol (born 1980), FC Barcelona and Los Angeles Lakers player, 2001–02 NBA Rookie of the Year Award winner; 2006 FIBA W.C. MVP
- Marc Gasol (born 1985), player for Memphis Grizzlies (2008–2019) and Toronto Raptors (2019–present)
- Fernando Martín (1962–1989), Estudiantes, Real Madrid and Portland Trail Blazers player
- Jan Martín (born 1984), German-Israeli-Spanish basketball player
- Juan Carlos Navarro (born 1980), FC Barcelona and Memphis Grizzlies player

=== Boxing ===
- Pedro Carrasco (1943–2001), 1967 European Lightweight Champion; 1971 WBC's World Lightweight Champion
- Javier Castillejo (born 1968), two-time WBC World Jr. Middleweight Champion and one-time WBA Middleweight champion

=== MMA ===
- Ilia Topuria (Born Jan 21, 1997) - UFC Former featherweight world champion and current lightweight world champion.

=== Cycling ===
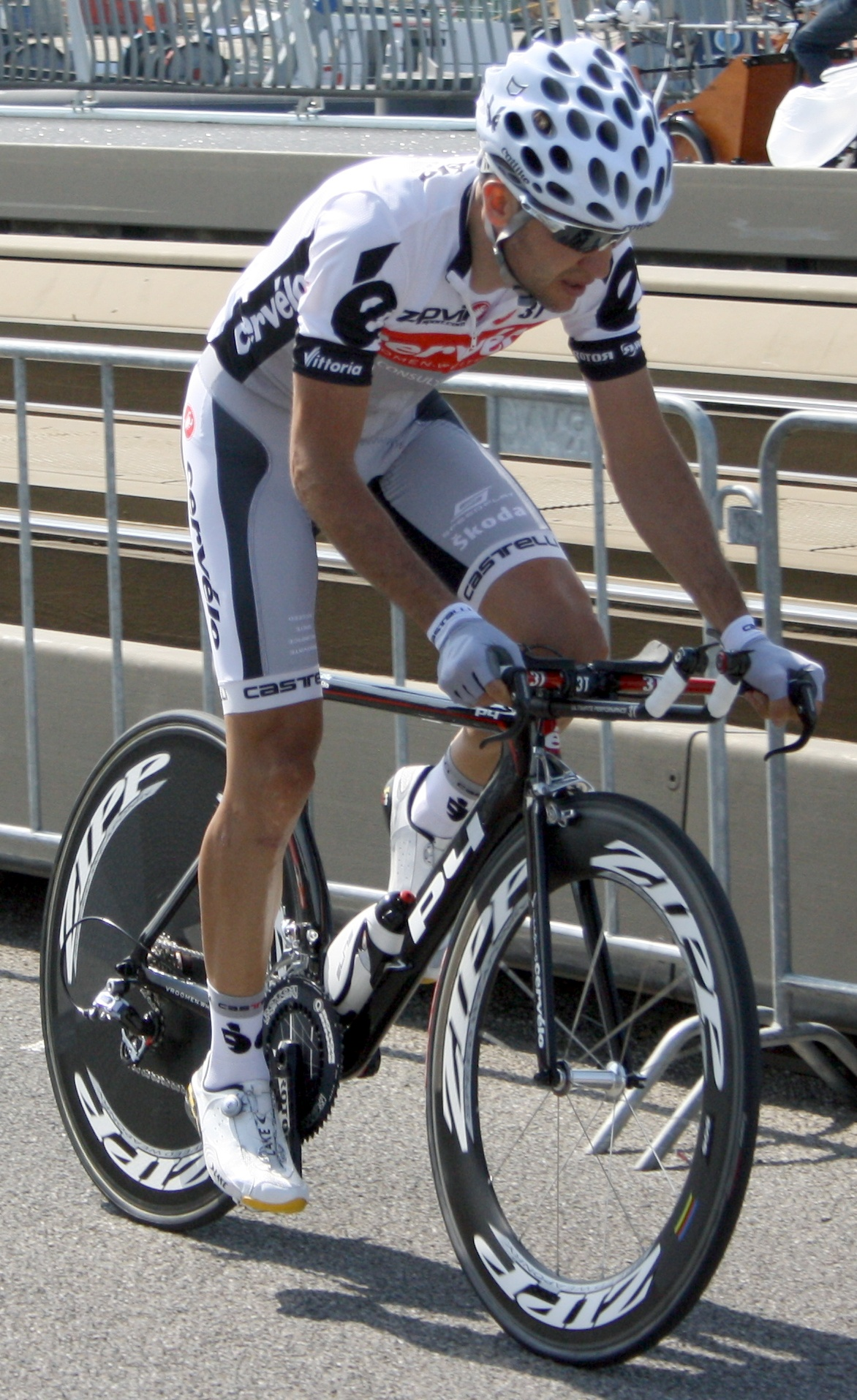
Carlos Sastre

- Federico Martín Bahamontes (1928–2023), 1959 Tour de France winner
- Alberto Contador (born 1982), three-time Tour de France (2007, 2009, 2010), 2008 Giro d'Italia, 2008 Vuelta a España winner
- Pedro Delgado (born 1960), 1988 Tour de France winner
- Óscar Freire (born 1976), three-time World Cycling Champion (1999, 2001, 2004)
- José Manuel Fuente (1945–1996), twice Vuelta a España winner (1972, 1974), second in Giro d'Italia (1972), third in Tour de France (1973)
- Roberto Heras (born 1974), three-time Vuelta a España winner (2000, 2003, 2004)
- Miguel Indurain (born 1964), gold medalist (1996 Olympics), 1995 World Time-Trial Champion, World Hour recordman (1994), five consecutive times Tour de France winner (1991–1995), twice Giro d'Italia winner (1992, 1993)
- Joan Llaneras (born 1969), gold medalist (2000 Olympics), silver medalist (2004 Olympics), seven-time World Points race or Madison Track Cycling Champion (1996, 1997, 1998, 1999, 2000, 2006, 2007)
- Luis Ocaña (1945–1994), 1973 Tour de France winner
- Abraham Olano (born 1970), 1995 World Cycling Champion and 1998 World Time-Trial Champion
- Óscar Pereiro (born 1977), 2006 Tour de France winner
- Samuel Sánchez (born 1978), Beijing 2008 Olympic Road Race Gold Medal
- Carlos Sastre (born 1975), 2008 Tour de France winner
- Joane Somarriba (born 1972), three-time Grande Boucle winner (2000, 2001, 2003)
- Guillermo Timoner (1926–2023), six-time World Motor paced Track Cycling Champion (1955, 1959, 1960, 1962, 1964, 1965)

=== Football (soccer) ===
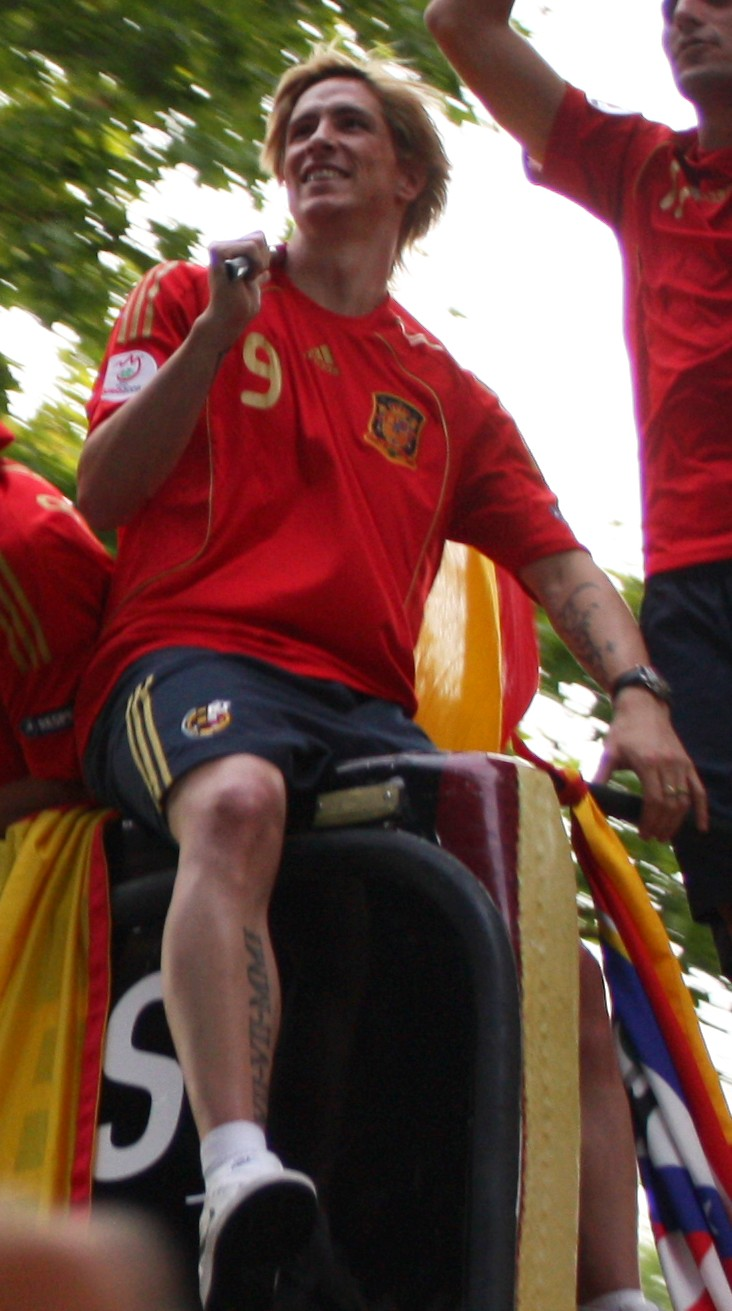
Torres celebrating victory with Spain at Euro 2008

- Paulino Alcántara (1896-1964) Football legend and FC Barcelona player and manager
- Iker Casillas (born 1981), goalkeeper and Real Madrid; captain of Spain's team that won UEFA Euro 2008, the 2010 FIFA World Cup and Euro 2012
- Francisco Gento (1933–2022), Real Madrid player; winner of six UEFA Champions League
- Raúl González (born 1977), first player to reach 50 goals in UEFA Champions League
- Xavi Hernández (born 1980), midfielder and FC Barcelona player; UEFA Euro 2008 MVP
- Andrés Iniesta (born 1984), midfielder and FC Barcelona player; scored the winning goal at the 2010 FIFA World Cup Final; UEFA Euro 2012 MVP
- Alexia Putellas (born 1994), FC Barcelona Femení midfielder and two-time Ballon d'Or Féminin winner
- Fernando Torres (born 1984), striker and Chelsea player; scored the winning goal at the Euro 2008 Final; winner of Golden Boot at Euro 2012
- David Villa (born 1981), striker and FC Barcelona player; Spain's all-time top goalscorer
- Andoni Zubizarreta (born 1961), Spanish international
- Gerard Piqué (born 1987), central defender for FC Barcelona and Spain; part of the national team that won the 2010 FIFA World Cup and UEFA Euro 2012
- Pako Ayestarán (born 1963), football manager known for his roles at Liverpool F.C. (2005 UEFA Champions League winners) and Valencia CF
- Lamine Yamal (Born 2007) Youngest Spanish goalscorer for the national team, at only 16 years and 57 days old

=== Golf ===
- Severiano Ballesteros (1957–2011), winner of five major championships
- Sergio García (born 1980), winner of a major championship
- Miguel Ángel Jiménez (born 1964), winner of 13 European Tour titles winner
- José María Olazábal (born 1966), winner of two major championships
- Jon Rahm (born 1994), the first Spanish golfer to win the US Open (2021) and winner of 12 other tournaments

=== Motor sports ===
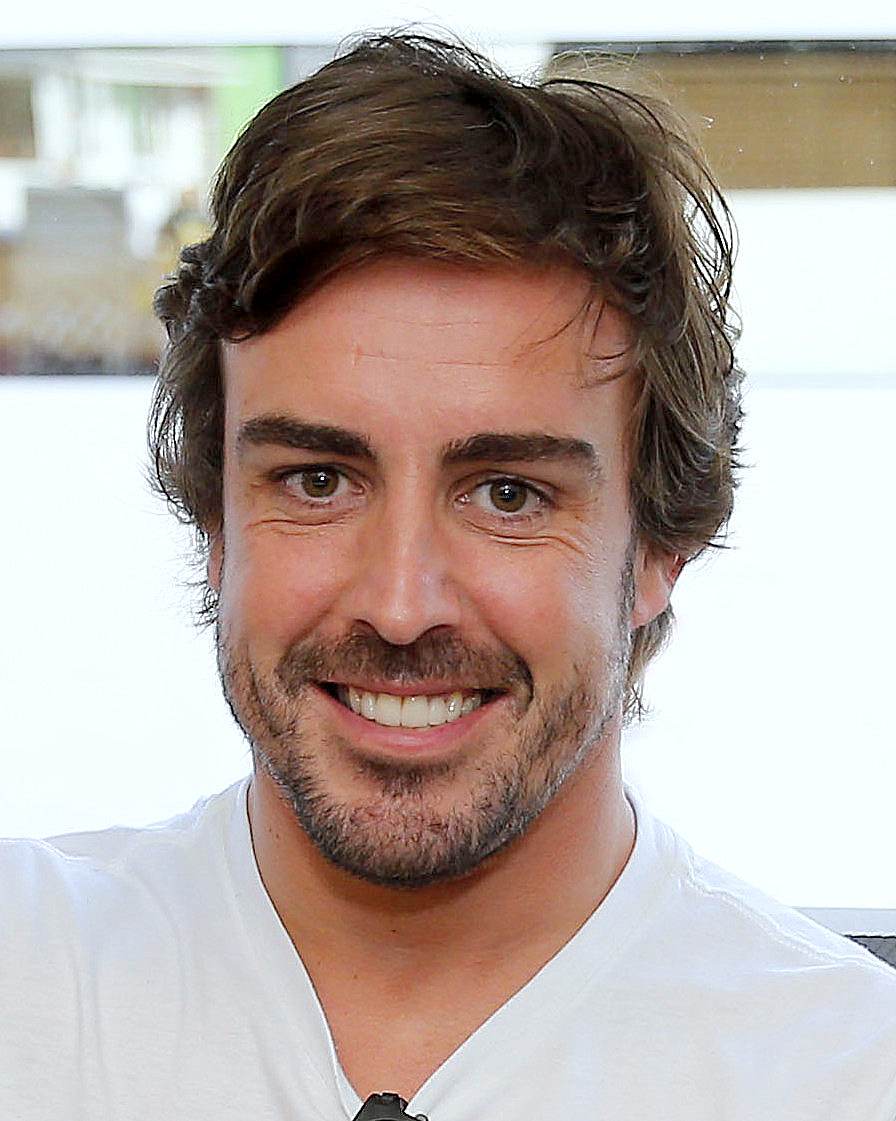
Fernando Alonso

- Fernando Alonso (born 1981), 2005 and 2006 Formula One World Champion
- Jaime Alguersuari (born 1990), 2008 British Formula Three champion
- Álvaro Bautista (born 1984), motorcycle racing raider, 125cc champion of the World in 2006
- Carlos Checa (born 1972), GP motorcycle racing rider and Superbike World Champion in 2011
- Marc Coma (born 1976), won the Dakar Rally in 2006
- Àlex Crivillé (born 1970), 500cc GP motorcycle racing World Champion in 1999
- Marc Gené (born 1974), Formula One driver
- Jorge Lorenzo (born 1987), 2006 and 2007 GP motorcycle racing 250cc World Champion, 2010, 2012, and 2015 MotoGP World Champion
- Marc Márquez (born 1993), Grand Prix motorcycle road racer, and is the 2013, 2014, 2016 and 2017 Moto GP World Champion
- Jorge Martínez Aspar (born 1962), GP motorcycle racing rider, four-time World Champion
- Pedro Martínez de la Rosa (born 1971), Formula One driver
- Ángel Nieto (1947–2017), GP motorcycle racing rider, 12+1 times World Champion
- Daniel Pedrosa (born 1985), youngest GP motorcycle racing World Champion of 125cc and 250cc
- Carlos Sainz (born 1962), 1990 and 1992 World Rally Champion and 4-times Dakar Rally winner
- Carlos Sainz Jr. (born 1994), Formula One driver

=== Rugby union ===
- Oriol Ripol, professional rugby union player for Worcester Warriors; considered the greatest Spaniard to ever play the game
- Cédric Garcia, professional rugby player for Aviron Bayonnais

=== Tennis ===
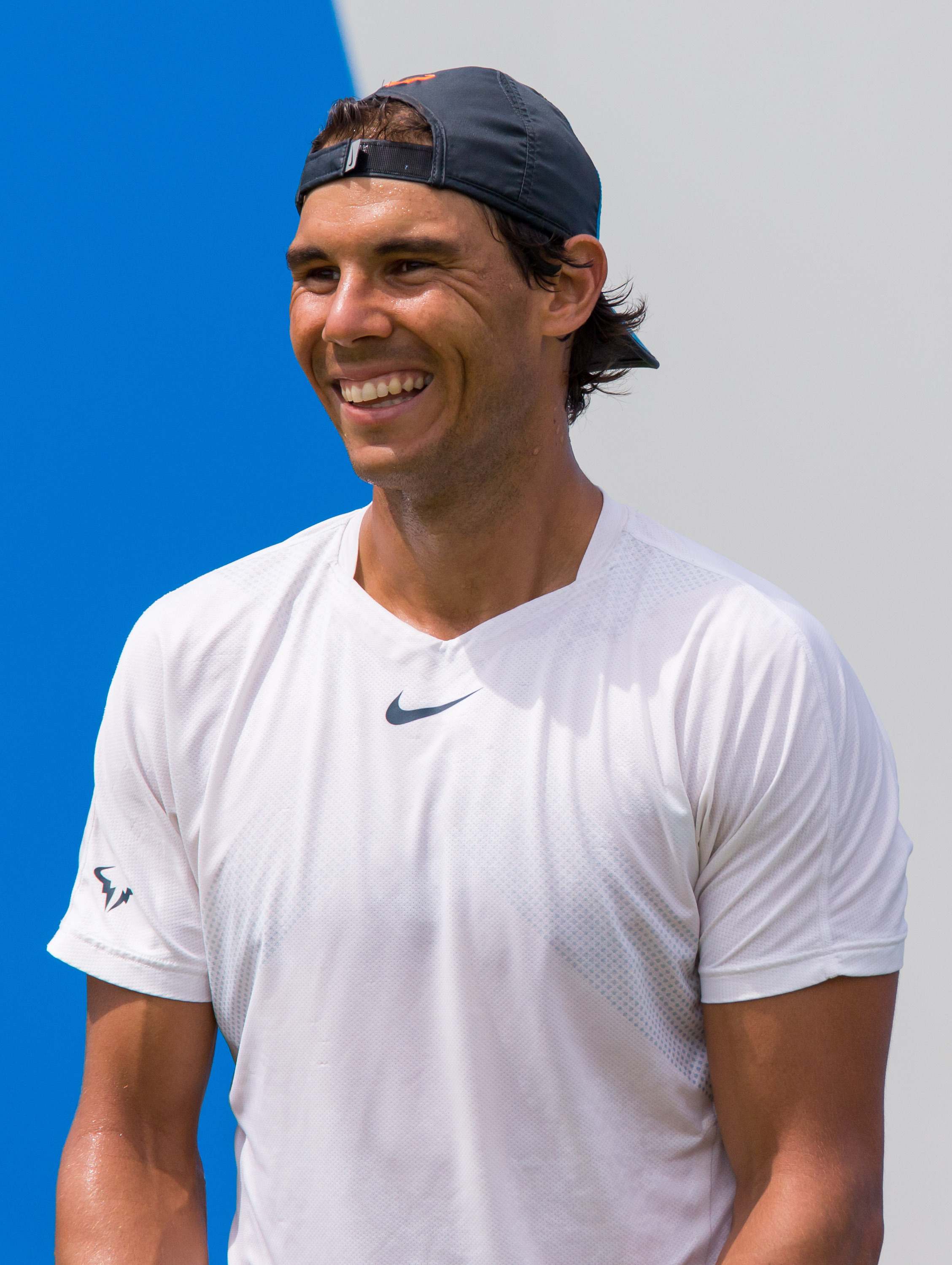
Rafael Nadal

- Carlos Alcaraz (born 2003), 7 Grand Slam titles winner and former World Number 1
- Galo Blanco (born 1976), professional tennis player
- Sergi Bruguera (born 1971), 1993 and 1994 French Open Men's Singles Champion
- Àlex Corretja (born 1974), 1998 ATP Tour World Champion
- Albert Costa (born 1975), 2002 French Open Men's Singles Champion
- Juan Carlos Ferrero (born 1980), 2003 French Open Men's Singles Champion, former World Number 1
- Andrés Gimeno (1937–2019), 1972 French Open Men's Singles Champion
- Conchita Martínez (born 1972), 1994 Wimbledon Women's Singles Champion
- Carlos Moyá (born 1976), 1998 French Open Men's Singles Champion, former World Number 1
- Garbiñe Muguruza (born 1993), 2016 French Open and 2017 Wimbledon Women's Singles Champion
- Rafael Nadal (born 1986), former World Number 1, winner of 22 Grand Slam titles (including a record 14-times French Open titles), 2008 Olympics and 2016 Olympics gold medallist
- Manuel Orantes (born 1949), 1975 U.S. Open Men's Singles Champion
- Virginia Ruano Pascual (born 1973), eight Grand Slam Doubles titles winner
- Arantxa Sánchez Vicario (born 1971), ten Grand Slam titles winner (four singles, six doubles), former World Number 1
- Emilio Sánchez Vicario (born 1965), three Grand Slam Doubles titles winner
- Javier Sánchez Vicario, professional tennis player, brother of Aranxta
- Manuel Santana (1938–2021), 5 Grand Slam titles winner (four singles, one doubles)
- Fernando Verdasco Carmona (born 1983), professional tennis player

=== Triathlon ===
- Francisco Javier Gómez Noya (born 1983), triathlon silver (London 2012) medalist; four times ITU Triathlon world champion

== Others ==
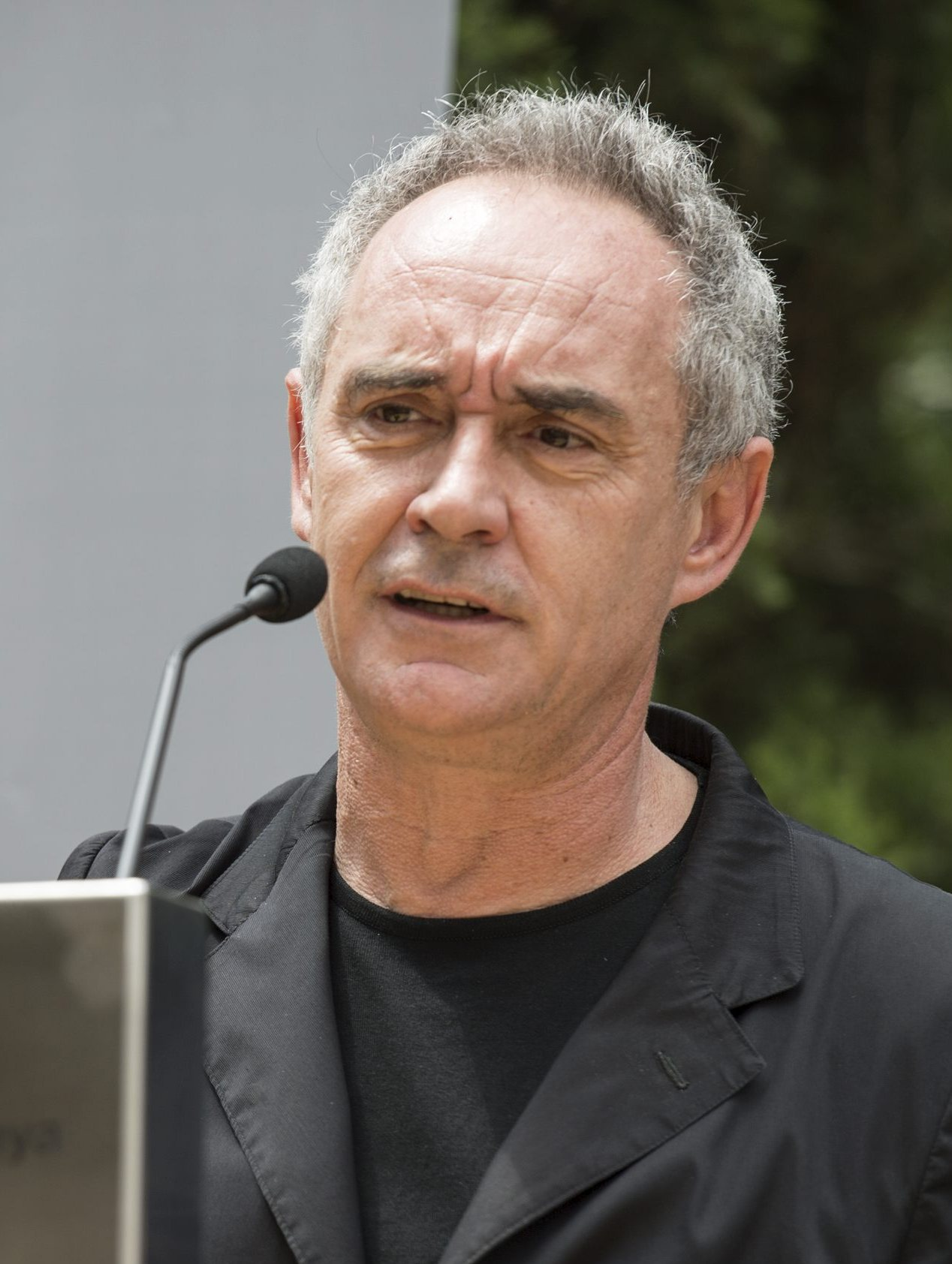
Ferran Adrià

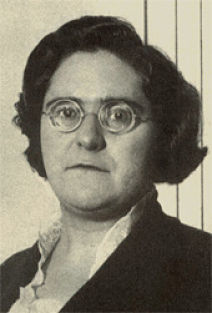
Federica Montseny

- Georgina Rodríguez (born 1994), influencer
- Charo (birth year debated), actress, singer, and flamenco guitarist, known for her TV appearances in the 1970s & 1980s
- Carlos Dominguez Cidon (1959–2009), chef
- Pilar Civeira, professor of medicine in Pamplona
- Charo Sádaba, professor of advertising in Pamplona
- María Josefa Cerrato Rodríguez (1897–1981), first woman veterinarian
- José Andrés (born 1969), chef
- Ferran Adrià (born 1962), chef
- Joaquín Cortés (born 1969), dancer
- Lola Greco (born 1964), dancer and choreographer
- Rosario Hernández Diéguez (1916–1936), newspaper hawker and trade unionist
- Juan March Ordinas (1880–1962), politician and businessman
- Francisco Mesa, electrical engineer
- Ana Morales (born 1982), flamenco dancer and choreographer
- Amancio Ortega Gaona (born 1936), entrepreneur
- Pepita de Oliva (1830–1871), dancer
- Ana María Pérez del Campo (born 1936), lawyer, feminist
- Juan Pujol, alias Garbo (1912–1988), double agent who played a key role in the success of D-Day towards the end of World War II
- Tamara Rojo (born 1974), prima ballerina of the London's Royal Ballet (since 2000); Prince of Asturias Award of Arts laureate (2005)
- Aurora Rodríguez Carballeira (1879–1955), woman who murdered her teenage daughter, conceived as a eugenics experiment
- Diego Salcedo (1575–1644), first Spaniard killed by Puerto Rican Taínos
- Eugenia Tenenbaum (born 1996), feminist and art historian
- Elbira Zipitria (1906–1982), Spanish-Basque educator, promoter of the Basque language
- Edmond de Bries (1897 – c.1936 or 1950), Spanish female impersonator, actor, and cuplé singer

== See also ==
- List of people by nationality
- List of Andalusians
- List of Aragonese
- List of Balearics
- List of Basques
- List of Catalans
- List of Galician people
- List of Spanish Jews
- List of Valencians
