= Jerónimo Cortés =

Spanish scientist

Jerónimo Cortés (c. 1560 - c. 1611) was a Spanish mathematician, astronomer, naturalist and Valencian compiler.

== Works ==
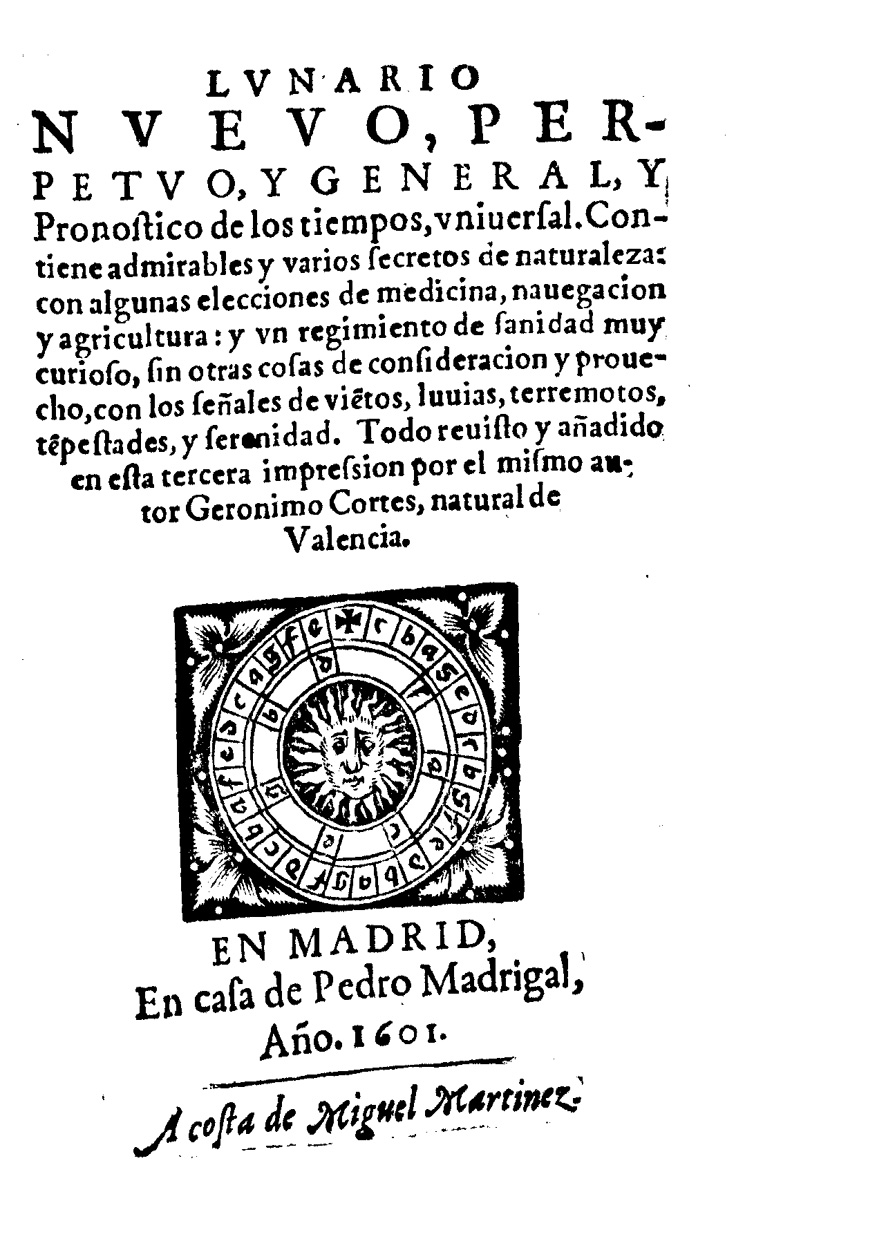
Lunario nueuo, perpetuo, y general, y pronostico de los tiempos, uniuersal, 1601

Many of Cortés works involved compilations of knowledge and writings of other authors. Some works include:

- Tratado del cómputo por la mano (1591)
- Compendio de reglas breves (1594)
- Lunario perpetuo (1594)
  - Lunario nueuo, perpetuo, y general, y pronostico de los tiempos, uniuersal (in Spanish). Madrid: Pedro Madrigal. 1601.
- Fisonomía natural y varios secretos de naturaleza (1597).
- Aritmética práctica (1604)
- Libro y tratado de los animales terrestres y volátiles (1613)
