= Francisco Pérez de Grandallana =

Spanish seaman and military man

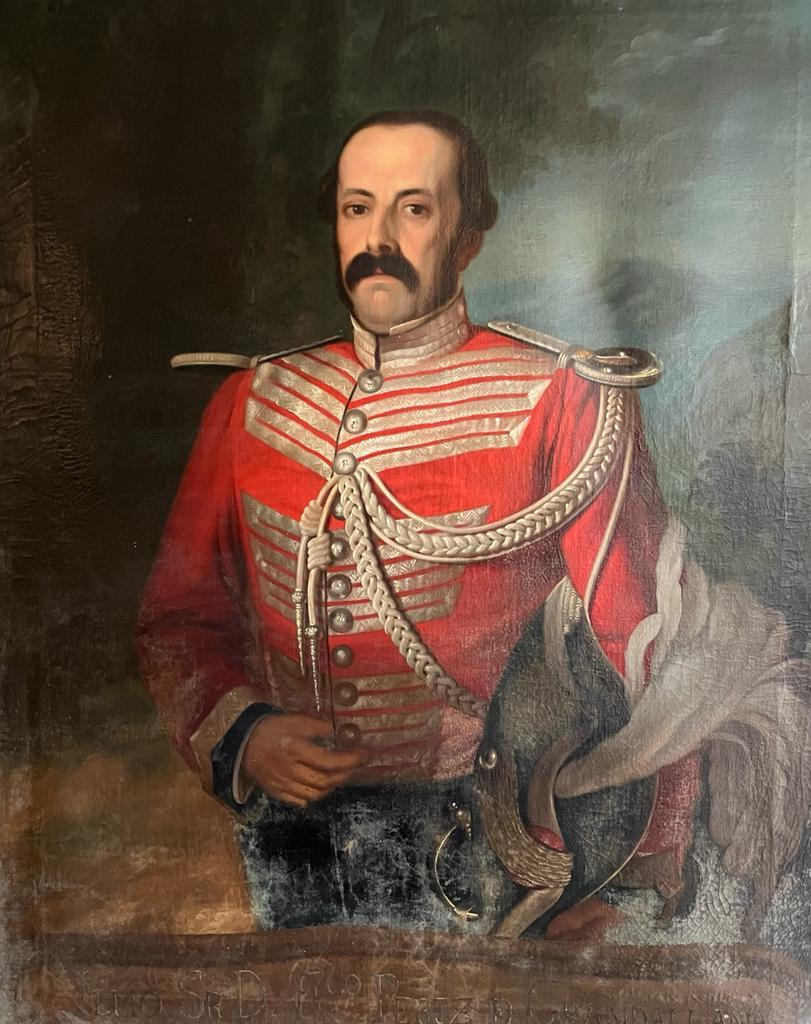

Francisco Pérez de Grandallana (1774–1841) was a brigadier of the Spanish Royal Navy. He fought in the English blockades of Cádiz, the Battle of Trafalgar and the Spanish War of Independence.
