= Francisco Mesa =

Francisco Mesa is an electrical engineer at the University of Seville, Spain. He was named a Fellow of the Institute of Electrical and Electronics Engineers (IEEE) in 2014 for his contributions to the theory and computation of wave propagation in microwave planar structures.
