= Juan Uría Ríu =

Spanish historian

Juan Uría Ríu (1891–1980) was a Spanish historian and ethnologist.
