= Clara Asunción García =

Spanish author

Clara Asunción García (Elche, 1968) is a Spanish writer. Her works cover a wide range of genres, including romantic intrigue, intimate drama, eroticism, and noir fiction.

She has written short stories, flash fiction, and novels in which the relationships between women are front and center. In addition, female homosexuality is the central theme of her works, some of which have been included in book recommendation lists and reviewed by specialized websites. Her anthology Y abrazarte was a finalist in the 2017 edition of the Guillermo de Baskerville Awards, by literary magazine Libros Prohibidos.

Among her novels, some of the titles that stand out include the series starring police detective Catherine S. Maynes. This character, according to literary historian Inmaculada Pertusa, represented a revival of the lesbian detective novel in Spain, since apart from the elements inherent to noir fiction, it includes others belonging to romance and erotic fiction as well, to the point of explicitly depicting lesbian erotic scenes with its protagonist.

Pertusa further adds that Asunción García is part of a generation of writers (along with Isabel Franc and Susana Hernández) who were influenced by the works of Jean M. Redmann, and who are pioneers in developing the theme of lesbianism in crime fiction—in García's case, with a marked erotic tone.

She has participated in events for the defense of the rights of LGBTQ+ people: giving talks at Pride events and taking part in the LGTBQ Book Fair in Chueca. She writes articles for websites that specialize in lesbian issues, such as Hay una lesbiana en mi sopa. (Note: English: There's a lesbian in my soup)

According to Professor Diana Aramburu, in the late 20th century there was a boom in detective fiction, which was once a male-only genre, "producing female detectives that continue to break with traditional stereotypes and captivate a crime fiction-hungry audience." This literary phenomenon has come to be known as "femicrime", (Note: The term comes from the Danish term femikrimi, which became popular in Denmark during the decade of the 2000s when there was a boom in female crime fiction. Frank Egholm Andersen has extensively studied the particularities of the Nordic phenomenon in Den nordiske femikrimi.) in which "a female detective is used to examine the socioeconomic crisis, crime, violence, and/or issues of identity and gender from a woman’s perspective." The genre has now become firmly established in the literary market in Spain. It dates back to 1979, with the first female hard-boiled detective, Bárbara Arenas, as written by Lourdes Ortiz in Picadura mortal. Along with Ortiz and Asunción García (with her Cate Maynes character), Aramburu also lists other authors who have created female detective characters, such as: Maria Antònia Oliver Cabrer (with the first serial woman detective in the Lònia Guiu series of novels), Alicia Giménez Bartlett (with her Petra Delicado series), Rosa Ribas Moliné (with Cornelia Weber-Tejedor), Carolina Solé (with Kate Salas), Cristina Fallarás (with Vicky González), Maruja Torres (with Diana Dial), Berna González Harbour (with María Ruiz), Dolores Redondo (with Amaia Salazar), Susana Hernández (with Rebeca Santana and Miriam Vázquez), and Isabel Franc (writing as Lola Van Guardia), who created Emma García, the first lesbian detective.

== List of works ==
=== Short stories and anthologies ===
- Short story Las cosas que hacen clinc pop, in the anthology Cada día me gustas más (CreateSpace, 2016, ISBN 9781540804501)
- Short story collection Y abrazarte. Antología de relatos con esa cosa llamada amor dando la tabarra. (CreateSpace, 2016, ISBN 9781540574572); finalist in the 2017 edition of the Guillermo de Baskerville Awards, by literary magazine Libros Prohibidos
- Short story ¿Te lo puedes creer?, in the anthology Donde no puedas amar, no te demores (Editorial Egales, 2016, ISBN 9788416491728; prologue by Josa Fructuoso
- Short story #Marimaryeva in the anthology Ábreme con cuidado (Editorial Dos Bigotes, 2015, ISBN 978-84-943559-8-1); a story that pays homage to the novel Carol by Patricia Highsmith; prologue by Gloria Fortún
- Short story collection Sexo, alcohol paracetamol y una imbécil: Colección de relatos de la detective privada Cate Maynes (CreateSpace, 2015, ISBN 9781519508768); stories starring the character of detective Cate Maynes
- Short story Un perro llamado Úrsula in the anthology Fundido en negro: antología de relatos del mejor calibre criminal femenino (Alrevés Editorial, 2014, ISBN 978-84-15900-50-4); story set in the Cate Maynes universe; edited by Inmaculada Pertusa
- Short story El camino de su piel, the short version of which was included in volume 2 of the journal Ámbitos Feministas (Feministas Unidas, Western Kentucky University, 2012, ISSN 2164-0998). A version in French, Le chemin de sa peau, was included in the book Lectures d’Espagne 3. Auteurs espagnols du XXI Siècle (Lectures d'Ailleurs, University of Poitiers, 2015, p. 375). The story is set in the Cate Maynes universe. An extended version was published in 2015.

=== Novels ===
- La perfección del silencio (Editorial Egales, 2013, ISBN 978-84-15899-00-6)
- Tras la coraza (Editorial Egales, 2016, ISBN 978-84-16491-36-0)
- Elisa frente al mar (CreateSpace, 2013, ISBN 978-1495951343; translated into French as Face à la mer (Éditions dans l'Engrenage, 2015, ISBN 978-2915342383), and English as Elisa facing the sea (CreateSpace, 2016, ISBN 978-1522898689)

==== Novels in the Cate Maynes series ====
- El primer caso de Cate Maynes (Editorial Egales, 2011, ISBN 978-84-92813-50-6)
- Los hilos del destino (Editorial Egales, 2014, ISBN 978-84-15899-83-9)

== See also ==
- LGBT literature in Spain
- Noir fiction
- Detective fiction

== Bibliography ==
- Aramburu, Diana (2017). "Resisting Invisibility: Lesbianizing the Public Space in Isabel Franc's Emma García Stories". Hispanic Review. 85 (1). Philadelphia, Pennsylvania: University of Pennsylvania Press: 47–67. doi:10.1353/hir.2017.0002. JSTOR 90000308.
- Aramburu, Diana (2019). Resisting Invisibility: Detecting the Female Body in Spanish Crime Fiction. Toronto: University of Toronto Press. ISBN 978-1-4875-0459-5. JSTOR 10.3138/j.ctvh9vxqd.
- Pertusa, Inmaculada (2014). "7. Nuevas detectives lesbianas para un nuevo milenio" [New lesbian detectives for a new millennium]. In Fernández-Ulloa, Teresa (ed.). Otherness in Hispanic Culture (in Spanish). Newcastle upon Tyne: Cambridge Scholars Publishing. pp. 105–121. ISBN 978-1-4438-5389-7.
- Pertusa, Inmaculada (2015). "5. Del negro al rojo: la erotización de la novela detectivesca lesbiana (española) en "El primer caso de Cate Maynes" de Clara Asunción García" [5. From black to red: the eroticization of the (Spanish) lesbian detective novel in Clara Asunción García's "El primer caso de Cate Maynes"]. In Losada Soler, Elena; Paszkiewicz, Katarzyna (eds.). Tras la pista. Narrativa criminal escrita por mujeres [On the trail. Crime narrative written by women.] (in Spanish). Barcelona: Icaria Editorial. pp. 97–112. ISBN 9788498886566.
