= 8th César Awards =

1983 French film awards ceremony

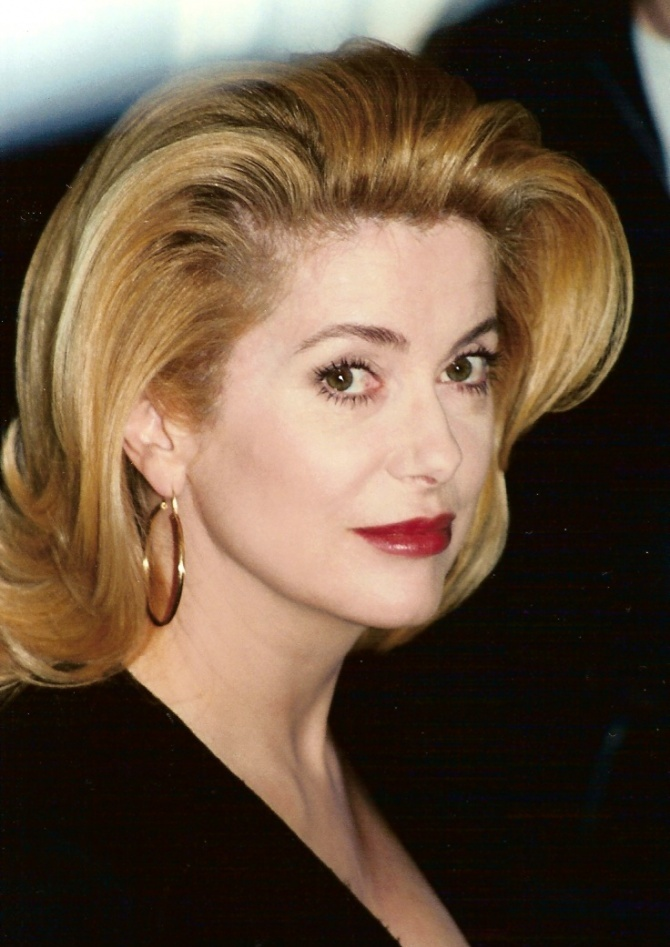
- Catherine Deneuve, Chair of the 8th César Awards
- Date: 26 February 1983
- Site: Le Grand Rex, Paris, France
- Hosted by: Jean-Claude Brialy

Highlights
- Best Film: La Balance
- Best Actor: Philippe Léotard
- Best Actress: Nathalie Baye

Television coverage
- Network: Antenne 2

The 8th César Awards ceremony, presented by the Académie des Arts et Techniques du Cinéma, honoured the best French films of 1982 and took place on 26 February 1983 at Le Grand Rex in Paris. The ceremony was chaired by Catherine Deneuve and hosted by Jean-Claude Brialy. La Balance won the award for Best Film.

== Winners and nominees ==
The winners are highlighted in bold:

- Best Film:
  **La Balance**, directed by Bob Swaim
  Danton, directed by Andrzej Wajda
  Passion, directed by Jean-Luc Godard
  Une chambre en ville, directed by Jacques Demy
- Best Foreign Film:
  **Victor Victoria**, directed by Blake Edwards
  E.T. the Extra-Terrestrial, directed by Steven Spielberg
  The French Lieutenant's Woman, directed by Karel Reisz
  Yol, directed by Serif Gören, Yılmaz Güney
- Best First Work:
  **Mourir à trente ans**, directed by Romain Goupil
  Josepha, directed by Christopher Frank
  Lettres d'amour en Somalie, directed by Frédéric Mitterrand
  Tir groupé, directed by Jean-Claude Missiaen
- Best Actor:
  **Philippe Léotard**, for La Balance
  Gérard Depardieu, for Danton
  Lino Ventura, for Les Misérables
  Gérard Lanvin, for Tir groupé
- Best Actress:
  **Nathalie Baye**, for La Balance
  Miou-Miou, for Josepha
  Romy Schneider, for La Passante du Sans-Souci
  Simone Signoret, for L'Étoile du Nord
- Best Supporting Actor:
  **Jean Carmet**, for Les Misérables
  Gérard Klein, for La Passante du Sans-Souci
  Michel Jonasz, for Qu'est-ce qui fait courir David?
  Jean-François Stévenin, for Une chambre en ville
- Best Supporting Actress:
  **Fanny Cottençon**, for L'Étoile du Nord
  Denise Grey, for La Boum 2
  Stéphane Audran, for Paradis pour tous
  Danielle Darrieux, for Une chambre en ville
- Most Promising Actor:
  **Christophe Malavoy**, for Family Rock
  Jean-Paul Comart, for La Balance
  Tchéky Karyo, for La Balance
  Dominique Pinon, for The Return of Martin Guerre
- Most Promising Actress:
  **Sophie Marceau**, for La Boum 2
  Souad Amidou, for Le Grand frère
  Fabienne Guyon, for Une chambre en ville
  Julie Jézéquel, for L'Étoile du Nord
- Best Director:
  **Andrzej Wajda**, for Danton
  Bob Swaim, for La Balance
  Jean-Luc Godard, for Passion
  Jacques Demy, for Une chambre en ville
- Best Original Screenplay:
  **Jean-Claude Carrière, Daniel Vigne**, for The Return of Martin Guerre
  Mathieu Fabiani, Bob Swaim, for La Balance
  Éric Rohmer, for Le Beau Mariage
  Élie Chouraqui, for Qu'est-ce qui fait courir David?
- Best Adaptation:
  **Jean Aurenche, Michel Grisolia, Pierre Granier-Deferre**, for L'Étoile du Nord
  Jean-Claude Carrière, for Danton
  Daniel Schmid, Pascal Jardin, for Hécate
  Robert Hossein, Alain Decaux, for Les Misérables
- Best Cinematography:
  **Henri Alekan**, for La Truite
  Edmond Richard, for Les Misérables
  Raoul Coutard, for Passion
  Jean Penzer, for Une chambre en ville
- Best Sound:
  **William Robert Sivel, Claude Villand**, for La Passante du Sans-Souci
  Piotr Zawadzki, Dominique Hennequin, Jean-Pierre Ruh, for Danton
  Pierre Gamet, Jacques Maumont, for Les Quarantièmes rugissants
  Gérard Lamps, André Hervée, for Une chambre en ville
- Best Editing:
  **Noëlle Boisson**, for Qu'est-ce qui fait courir David?
  Françoise Javet, for La Balance
  Henri Lanoë, for Les Quarantièmes rugissants
  Armand Psenny, for Tir groupé
  Jean Ravel, for L'Étoile du Nord
- Best Music:
  **Michel Portal**, for The Return of Martin Guerre
  Vladimir Cosma, for La Boum 2
  Georges Delerue, for La Passante du Sans-Souci
  Michel Colombier, for Une chambre en ville
- Best Production Design:
  **Alain Nègre**, for The Return of Martin Guerre
  François de Lamothe, for Les Misérables
  Alexandre Trauner, for La Truite
  Bernard Evein, for Une chambre en ville
- Best Animated Short:
  **La Légende du pauvre bossu**, directed by Michel Ocelot
  Chronique 1909, directed by Paul Brizzi, Gaëtan Brizzi
  Sans préavis, directed by Michel Gauthier
- Best Fiction Short Film:
  **Bluff**, directed by Philippe Bensoussan
  Corre, gitano, directed by Tony Gatlif
  Merlin ou le cours de l'or, directed by Arthur Joffé
  La Saisie, directed by Yves-Noël François
- Best Documentary Short Film:
  **Junkopia**, directed by Chris Marker
  L'Ange de l'abîme, directed by Annie Tresgot
  Los Montes, directed by José Martin Sarmiento
  Sculptures sonores, directed by Jacques Barsac

== See also ==
- 55th Academy Awards
- 36th British Academy Film Awards
