= Simone Signoret =

French actress (1921–1985)

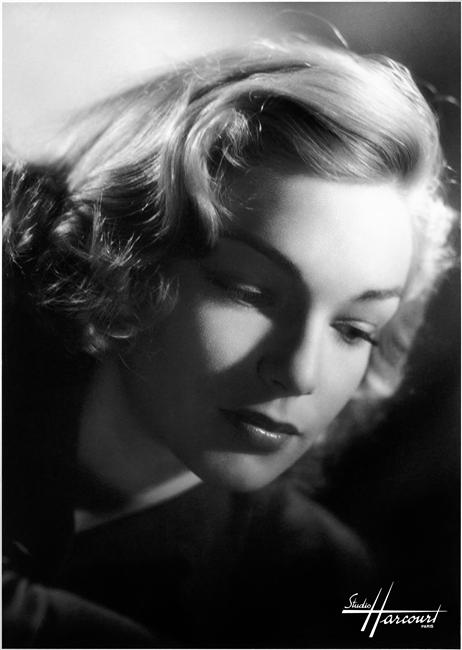
- Signoret in 1947
- Born: Simone Henriette Charlotte Kaminker; 25 March 1921; Wiesbaden, Germany
- Died: 30 September 1985 (aged 64); Autheuil-Authouillet, France
- Burial place: Père Lachaise Cemetery, Paris, France
- Occupation: Actress
- Years active: 1942–1985
- Spouses: Yves Allégret (m. 1944; div. 1949) Yves Montand (m. 1951)
- Children: Catherine Allégret

Simone Signoret (French: [simɔn siɲɔʁɛ]; born Simone Henriette Charlotte Kaminker; 25 March 1921 – 30 September 1985) was a French actress. She received various accolades, including an Academy Award, three BAFTA Awards, a César Award, a Primetime Emmy Award, and the Cannes Film Festival Award for Best Actress, in addition to nominations for two Golden Globe Awards.

== Early life ==
Signoret was born Simone Henriette Charlotte Kaminker in Wiesbaden, Germany, to Georgette (née Signoret) and André Kaminker. She was the eldest of three children, with two younger brothers. Her father, a pioneering interpreter who worked in the League of Nations, was a French-born army officer from an assimilated and middle-class Polish-Jewish and Hungarian-Jewish family, who brought the family to Neuilly-sur-Seine on the outskirts of Paris. Her mother, Georgette, from whom she acquired her stage name, was a French Catholic.

Signoret grew up in Paris in an intellectual atmosphere and studied English, German and Latin. After completing secondary school during the Nazi occupation, Simone was responsible for supporting her family and forced to take work as a typist for a French collaborationist newspaper Les nouveaux temps, run by Jean Luchaire.

== Career ==
During the occupation of France, Signoret mixed with an artistic group of writers and actors who met at the Café de Flore in the Saint-Germain-des-Prés quarter. By this time, she had developed an interest in acting and was encouraged by her friends, including her lover Daniel Gélin to follow her ambition. In 1942, she began appearing in bit parts and was able to earn enough money to support her mother and two brothers as her father, who was a French patriot, had fled the country in 1940 to join General De Gaulle in England. She took her mother's maiden name for the screen to help hide her Jewish roots.

Signoret's sensual features and earthy nature led to type-casting and she was often seen in roles as a prostitute. She won considerable attention in La Ronde (1950), a film which was banned briefly in New York City as immoral. She won further acclaim, including an acting award from the British Film Academy, for her portrayal of another prostitute, Amélie Élie, in Jacques Becker's Casque d'or (1951), which in France became a signature role for her. She appeared in many French films during the 1950s, including Thérèse Raquin (1953), directed by Marcel Carné, Les Diaboliques (1954), and The Crucible (Les Sorcières de Salem; 1956), based on Arthur Miller's The Crucible.

Simone Signoret with Laurence Harvey in Room at the Top; the film established her as an international actress.

In 1958, Signoret acted in the English independent film Room at the Top (1959), and her performance won numerous awards, including the Best Female Performance Prize at Cannes and the Academy Award for Best Actress. She was offered films in Hollywood, but for the next few years worked in Europe—for example, with Laurence Olivier in Term of Trial (1962). (Note: Signoret was to appear in The Lion, for Twentieth-Century Fox, but the film ultimately starred Capucine; another Fox movie she was offered, Justine, finally appeared with Anouk Aimée in the title role.) She earned another Oscar nomination for her work on Ship of Fools (1965); was part of a cast of international stars recreating the liberation of Paris in Paramount's epic Is Paris Burning?; then, after working with Sidney Lumet on The Deadly Affair and The Sea Gull, she returned permanently to France in 1969.

In November 1960, Signoret was interviewed by John Freeman, about her career and life for BBC television series Face to Face. Signoret was one of only two women to be interviewed as part of the first iteration of the series, the other being renowned poet Dame Edith Sitwell.

In 1962, Signoret translated Lillian Hellman's play The Little Foxes into French for a production in Paris that ran for six months at the Théâtre Sarah-Bernhardt. She played the Regina role as well. Hellman was displeased with the production, although the translation was approved by scholars selected by Hellman. Signoret's one attempt at Shakespeare, performing Lady Macbeth with Alec Guinness at the Royal Court Theatre in London in 1966 proved to be ill-advised, with some harsh critics; one referred to her English as "impossibly Gallic".

Signoret won acclaim for her portrayal of a weary madam in Madame Rosa (1977) and as an unmarried sister who unknowingly falls in love with her paralyzed brother via anonymous correspondence in I Sent a Letter to my Love (1980). She continued to act until her death, working on the miniseries Music-Hall while terminally ill.

== Personal life ==
Signoret's memoirs, Nostalgia Isn't What It Used to Be, were published in 1976. She also wrote the novel Adieu Volodya, published in 1985, the year of her death: this was autobiographical in its depiction of Jewish immigrants in France between the wars. Both books were best-sellers in France.

Signoret first married filmmaker Yves Allégret (1944–1949), with whom she had a daughter Catherine Allégret.

Her second marriage was to the Italian-born French actor Yves Montand in 1951, a union which lasted until her death; the couple had no children. They were both active in left-wing and humanitarian causes, although as they grew older she gravitated towards the political centre and he to the right.

Signoret died of pancreatic cancer in Autheuil-Authouillet, France, aged 64. She was buried in Père Lachaise Cemetery in Paris, and Yves Montand later was buried next to her.

Signoret acknowledged her Jewish-European roots but did not identify as Jewish, as she had been raised Catholic by her French mother. She visited Israel, but never returned, after being faced with the camps of Palestinians, as she described it in her memoir Nostalgia isn't what it used to be. Despite this, she was critical of antisemitism in the French Communist Party. Because she was of patrilineal Jewish ancestry and was therefore not considered Jewish under traditional halakha, and never practice any form of Judaism, there was no religious ceremony at her funeral.

== Filmography ==
Year	Title	Role	Notes
1942	Bolero	Une employée de la maison de couture	Uncredited
1942	Prince Charming	Extra	Uncredited
1942	Les Visiteurs du Soir	Extra	Uncredited
1942	The Benefactor	La sécrétaire du journal	Uncredited
1943	Strange Inheritance	Extra	Uncredited
1943	Goodbye Leonard	La gitane	Uncredited
1944	The Angel of the Night	Une étudiante	Uncredited
1944	Behold Beatrice	Liliane Moraccini	
1944	Night Shift	La danseuse à la taverne	Uncredited
1944	Death No Longer Awaits	La maitresse de Firmin	
1945	Box of Dreams	Une femme	Uncredited
1946	Dawn Devils	Lily, la cabaretière	
1946	The Ideal Couple	Annette	
1946	Back Streets of Paris	Gisèle	
1947	Fantômas	Hélène	
1948	Against the Wind	Michele Dennis	
1948	Dédée d'Anvers	Dédée	
1948	Dilemma of Two Angels	Marianne	
1950	Manèges	Dora	
1950	Swiss Tour	Yvonne	
1950	La Ronde	Leocadie, the Prostitute	
1950	Gunman in the Streets	Denise Vernon	(also released as The Hunted)
1951	...Sans laisser d'adresse	Une journaliste	Uncredited
1951	Shadow and Light	Isabelle Leritz	
1952	Casque d'or	Marie 'Casque d'Or'	BAFTA Award for Best Foreign Actress
1953	Thérèse Raquin	Thérèse Raquin	
1955	Les Diaboliques	Nicole Horner	
1955	Mother Courage and Her Children	Yvette, Lagerhure	(unfinished)
1956	Death in the Garden	Djin	
1957	The Crucible	Elisabeth Procter	BAFTA Award for Best Foreign Actress; Karlovy Vary International Film Festival Award for Best Actress
1958	Room at the Top	Alice Aisgill	Academy Award for Best Actress; BAFTA Award for Best Foreign Actress; Cannes Film Festival Award for Best Actress; Jussi Award for Best Foreign Actress; Laurel Award for Top Female Dramatic Performance (3rd Place); National Board of Review Award for Best Actress; New York Film Critics Circle Award for Best Actress (2nd Place); Nominated — Golden Globe Award for Best Actress in a Motion Picture – Drama
1960	General Electric Theater	Woman	Episode: Don't You Remember?
1960	Adua and Friends	Adua Giovannetti	(also released as Hungry for Love)
1961	Les Mauvais Coups	Roberte	
1961	Famous Love Affairs	Jenny	(segment "Jenny de Lacour")
1962	Term of Trial	Anna	
1963	The Shortest Day		
1963	The Day and the Hour	Therese Dutheil	
1963	Sweet and Sour	Madame Geneviève	
1965	Ship of Fools	La Contessa	Nominated — Academy Award for Best Actress; Nominated — BAFTA Award for Best Foreign Actress; Nominated — Golden Globe Award for Best Actress in a Motion Picture – Drama
1965	The Sleeping Car Murders	Eliane Darès	
1966	Is Paris Burning?	La patronne du bistrot / Cafe Owner	
1966	Bob Hope Presents the Chrysler Theatre	Sara Lescault	Episode: "A Small Rebellion"; Primetime Emmy Award for Outstanding Single Performance by an Actress in a Leading Role in a Drama
1967	The Deadly Affair	Elsa Fennan	Nominated — BAFTA Award for Best Foreign Actress
1967	Games	Lisa Schindler	Nominated — BAFTA Award for Best Actress in a Supporting Role
1968	Mr. Freedom	Cameo	Uncredited
1968	The Sea Gull	Arkadina, an actress	
1969	Army of Shadows	Mathilde	
1969	L'Américain	Léone	
1970	The Confession	Mme L. Lise London	
1970	A Hostage	Meg	TV movie
1971	Comptes à rebours	Léa	
1971	Le Chat	Clémence Bouin	Silver Bear for Best Actress (at the 21st Berlin International Film Festival)
1971	La Veuve Couderc	Veuve Couderc Tati	
1973	The Burned Barns	Rose	
1973	Rude journée pour la reine	Jeanne	
1975	La Chair de l'orchidée	Lady Vamos	
1976	Police Python 357	Thérèse Ganay	
1977	Madame Rosa	Madame Rosa	César Award for Best Actress; David di Donatello Award for Best Foreign Actress (tied with Jane Fonda for Julia)
1978	Madame le juge	Elisabeth Massot	TV series, 6 episodes
1978	Judith Therpauve	Judith Therpauve	
1979	The Adolescent	Mamie	
1980	I sent a letter to my love	Louise Martin	
1982	L'étoile du nord	Mme Louise Baron	Nominated — César Award for Best Actress
1982	Guy de Maupassant	Maupassant's mother	
1983	Thérèse Humbert	Thérèse Humbert	
1985	Des terroristes à la retraite	Narrator	
1986	Music-Hall	Yvonne Pierre	Broadcast posthumously

== Awards and nominations ==
Year	Award	Category	Nominated work	Result	Ref.
1959	Academy Awards	Best Actress	Room at the Top	Won	
1965	Academy Awards	Best Actress	Ship of Fools	Nominated	
1971	Berlin International Film Festival	Best Actress	Le Chat	Won (Note: Tied with Shirley MacLaine for Desperate Characters.)	
1952	British Academy Film Awards	Best Foreign Actress	Casque d'Or	Won	
1957	British Academy Film Awards	Best Foreign Actress	The Crucible	Won	
1958	British Academy Film Awards	Best Foreign Actress	Room at the Top	Won	
1965	British Academy Film Awards	Best Foreign Actress	Ship of Fools	Nominated	
1967	British Academy Film Awards	Best Foreign Actress	The Deadly Affair	Nominated	
1968	British Academy Film Awards	Best Actress in a Supporting Role	Games	Nominated	
1959	Cannes Film Festival	Best Actress	Room at the Top	Won	
1977	César Awards	Best Actress	Madame Rosa	Won	
1982	César Awards	Best Actress	L'Étoile du Nord	Nominated	
1977	David di Donatello Awards	Best Foreign Actress	Madame Rosa	Won (Note: Tied with Jane Fonda for Julia.)	
1959	Golden Globe Awards	Best Actress in a Motion Picture – Drama	Room at the Top	Nominated	
1965	Golden Globe Awards	Best Actress in a Motion Picture – Drama	Ship of Fools	Nominated	
1959	Jussi Awards	Best Foreign Actress	Room at the Top	Won	
1957	Karlovy Vary International Film Festival	Best Actress	The Crucible	Won (Note: Tied with Tzvetana Arnaudova for Urok istorii.)	
1959	Laurel Awards	Top Female Dramatic Performance	Room at the Top	3rd Place	
1959	National Board of Review Awards	Best Actress	Room at the Top	Won	
1959	New York Film Critics Circle Awards	Best Actress	Room at the Top	2nd Place	
1966	Primetime Emmy Awards	Outstanding Single Performance by an Actress in a Leading Role in a Drama	Bob Hope Presents the Chrysler Theatre (Episode: "A Small Rebellion")	Won	

== Popular culture ==
- Diane Kurys's 2025 feature Moi qui t'aimais is about Signoret and Montand's last years together: Marina Foïs plays Signoret.
- A BBC TV film, Madame Montand and Mrs Miller (1992), depicted the relationship between Signoret and Marilyn Monroe during the filming of Let's Make Love, when Monroe had an affair with Yves Montand. Sue Glover wrote the script and Pauline Larrieu played Signoret.
- Glover's subsequent stage-play on the same subject, Marilyn, premiered at the Citizens' Theatre, Glasgow in 2011, with Dominique Hollier playing Signoret.
- Singer Nina Simone (born Eunice Waymon) took her last name from Simone Signoret.

== See also ==
- Cinema of France
- César Award for Best Actress
- List of actors with two or more Academy Award nominations in acting categories
- List of French Academy Award winners and nominees

== Works cited ==
- Bouchardeau, Huguette (2005). Simone Signoret: Biographie (in French). Paris: Flammarion. ISBN 2-08-068749-2.
- David, Catherine (1993). Simone Signoret. Translated by Sampson, Sally. Woodstock, New York: Overlook Press. ISBN 0-87951-491-4.

=== Further reading ===
- DeMaio, Patricia A. "Garden Of Dreams: The Life of Simone Signoret," 2014
- Signoret, Simone. Nostalgia Isn't What It Used To Be. London: Weidenfeld and Nicolson, 1978. ISBN 0-297-77417-4.
