= Jean M. Redmann =

American novelist (born 1955)

- Born: June 9, 1955 (age 71); Mississippi, U.S.
- Occupations: Novelist, activist
- Writing career
- Pen name: J. M. Redmann
- Period: 20th century
- Genre: Mystery
- Subject: Lesbian fiction
- Movement: LGBT literature

Jean M. Redmann (born June 9, 1955, in Mississippi), known professionally as J. M. Redmann and R. Jean Reid, is an American novelist best known for her Micky Knight mystery series, which has won the Lambda Literary Award for Lesbian Mystery three times and been a finalist four times.

Redmann's novels contain similar themes regarding the protagonist's troubled childhood and how it affects her adult life, discrimination based on sexual orientation and alcoholism. Her novels follow the tradition of hardboiled fiction.

She is a gay rights activist and works as the director of prevention at NO/AIDS Task Force.

Redmann's work has influenced several Spanish authors, who have also created detective characters and developed crime fiction stories based on lesbian female characters. These authors include Clara Asunción García, Isabel Franc, and Susana Hernández.

== Awards ==
Awards for Redmann's writing
Year	Work	Award	Result	Ref.
1993	Deaths of Jocasta	Lambda Literary Award for Lesbian Mystery	Finalist	
1996	The Intersection of Law and Desire	Lambda Literary Award for Lesbian Mystery	Won	
2000	Lost Daughters	Lambda Literary Award for Lesbian Mystery	Finalist	
2010	Death of a Dying Man	Lambda Literary Award for Lesbian Mystery	Won	
2011	Water Mark	Golden Crown Literary Society Award for Mystery/Thriller	Won	
2011	Water Mark	Lambda Literary Award for Lesbian Mystery	Finalist	
2011	Water Mark	Rainbow Award for LGBT Mystery	Won	
2012	Night Shadows: Queer Horror	Shirley Jackson Award for Edited Anthology	Finalist	
2012	Night Shadows: Queer Horror	Lambda Literary Award for Science Fiction, Fantasy, and Horror	Finalist	
2013	Ill Will	Lambda Literary Award for Lesbian Mystery	Won	
2018	The Girl on the Edge of Summer	Lambda Literary Award for Lesbian Mystery	Finalist	
2024	Transitory	Joseph Hansen Award	Won	

== Publications ==
=== Micky Knight series ===
1. Death by the Riverside (1990)
2. Deaths of Jocasta (1992)
3. The Intersection of Law and Desire (1995)
4. Lost Daughters (1999)
5. Death of a Dying Man (2009)
6. Water Mark (2010)
7. Ill Will (2012)
8. The Shoal of Time (2013)
9. The Girl on the Edge of Summer (2017)
10. Not Dead Enough (2019)
11. Transitory (2023)
12. The Smallest Day (2025)

=== Nell McGraw series (as R. Jean Reid) ===
1. Roots of Murder (2016)
2. Perdition (2017)

=== Anthology contributions ===
- The Milk of Human Kindness, edited by Lori L. Lake (2004)
- Women of Mystery: An Anthology, edited by Katherine V. Forrest (2006)
- Women in Uniform: Medics and Soldiers and Cops, Oh My!, edited by Pat Cronin (2010)
- Lesbians on the Loose: Crime Writers on the Lam, edited by Narrelle M. Harris (2015)
- The Only One in the World: A Sherlock Holmes Anthology, edited by Narrelle M. Harris (2021)

=== Anthologies edited ===
- Women of the Mean Streets, with Greg Herren (2011)
- Men of the Mean Streets: Gay Noir, with Greg Herren (2011)
- Night Shadows: Queer Horror, with Greg Herren (2012)
