= Susana Hernández =

Susana Hernández may refer to:

- Susana Hernández (writer), Spanish writer
- E. Susana Hernández, Argentine physicist
