= Joseph Pleigneur =

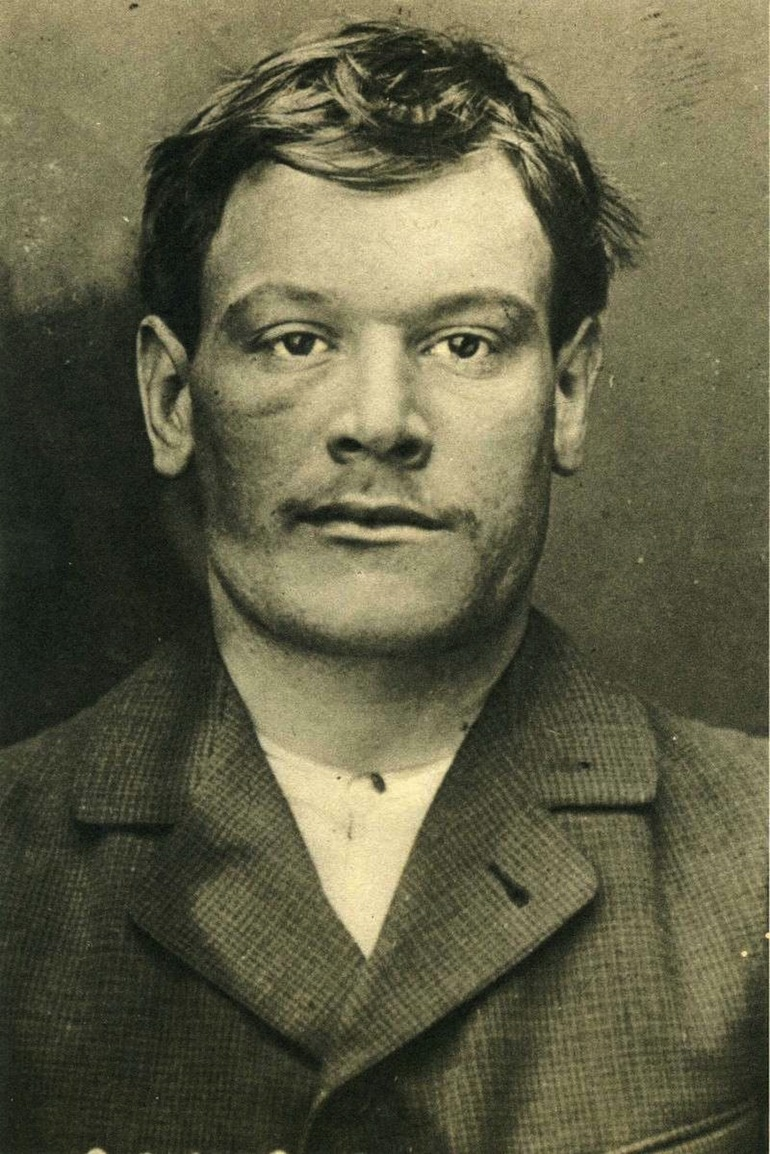
- Joseph Pleigneur on 13 June 1900.
- Born: 19 April 1876; Paris, France
- Died: 1936 (aged 59–60); Cayenne, Guyane
- Other name: Manda
- Criminal charges: Racketeering, procuring, stabbing
- Penalty: Life imprisonment on Devil's Island

Details
- Country: France
- Date apprehended: 30 May 1902; 124 years ago

Joseph Pleigneur, widely known by his alias "Manda", was a notorious figure in the Parisian criminal underworld of the late 19th and early 20th centuries. His name became infamous due to his involvement in gang conflicts, racketeering, and his love affair with Amélie Élie, also known as "Casque d'Or".

== Early life ==
On April 19, 1876, Pleigneur was born at 38 rue Ramponneau, in the 20th arrondissement of Paris, to a driver father and a laundress mother. His father, Louis, died when Joseph was only six. His mother, Jeanne, was left to raise him and his two other siblings, Joseph being the youngest. Due to financial struggle, Pleigneur was placed into a government care facility at the age of one, and was reunited with his mother a year later.

At the age of seven, Pleigneur was back on his own after being tossed out into the streets. At age ten, he worked for Baudry, a street cleaner, for fifteen cents a day. Pleigneur was known to work hard during the day and commit petty crime at night.

On December 18, 1889, he was arrested for theft. It is not known whether he received a punishment for the 1889 theft until a second offense in 1890, which sent him into a juvenile correctional facility in La Vienne. Upon release, he committed an assault and was sent to prison for four months. In 1897 and 1898, two further convictions for theft landed him in a Paris street prison.

== Life of crime ==
During his life of petty crime, Pleigneur became known as an "Apache", a Parisian term used to describe the French street gangs of the early 1900s. The era's news often described the violence perpetrated by these gangs as synonymous with the ferocity of Apache Indians from America in battle. These gangs typically consisted of young men like Pleigneur, and they roamed certain areas of Paris and commit crimes and control gang land.

In 1898, at the age of 22, Pleigneur became romantically involved with Amélie Élie, who later gained fame as "Casque d'Or" due to her striking golden hair. Their relationship took a dramatic turn when Casque d'Or left him for François Leca, the leader of the rival Popincourt gang. Consumed by jealousy, Pleigneur stabbed Leca, igniting a violent feud between the two gangs. These street battles, which took place in broad daylight, were widely reported by the press. The newspaper Le Petit Journal described the events as reminiscent of "Apaches of the Wild West".

== Imprisonment and death ==
Following Pleigneur's and Leca's arrest, the Manda trial began on 30 May 1902 and a crowd of curious people flocked to see his conviction. He did eventually pay for his crimes and ultimately, he was sentenced to life imprisonment in the penal colony Devil's Island in French Guiana.

In 1922, after two decades of imprisonment, he was granted release but was prohibited from returning to Europe. He remained isolated in French Guiana, expressing his loneliness: "What a life. No one shakes your hand. You don't sit anywhere. No one offers you a chair."

Pleigneur died in Cayenne in 1936.
