= Susana Hernández (writer) =

Spanish author

- Born: Susana Hernández Marcet; 1969 (age 56–57); Barcelona
- Occupation: Writer
- Writing career
- Language: Spanish
- Genre: Noir fiction
- Notable work: Contra las cuerdas
- Notable awards: Ciudad de San Adrián (2015); Cubelles Noir (2016, 2018); Ciudad de Lebrija (2021)
- Website: susanahernandez.net

Susana Hernández Marcet (Barcelona, 1969) is a Spanish writer who specializes in noir fiction. She created the character of Inspector Rebeca Santana, a lesbian investigator, who is the protagonist of several novels. Hernández has also written theatrical plays and taught literary workshops.

Hernández studied image and sound and social integration, as well as private investigation and psychology. In addition to collaborating with print and radio media outlets, she has excelled as a writer. In 2005, she won the Ciudad de Sant Adrià award and was a finalist in the 2013 Valencia Negra literary festival. Inspector Santana was chosen as the best female character in noir and detective fiction in the 2012 LeeMisterio awards.

Along with writers Clara Asunción García and Isabel Franc, Hernández was a pioneer in creating criminal or detective plots around lesbian characters. All these novelists show an influence by US author Jean M. Redmann.

Eva Paris-Huesca, in Curvas peligrosas en el contexto de los feminismos del nuevo milenio (Note: English: Dangerous curves in the context of feminism of the new millennium) (2013) quotes Professor Shelley Godsland when she explains that this vast body of female-authored literature developed in Spain from the 1980s onwards, establishing a dialogue with the various feminist movements that have been gradually developing alongside the progress made by Spanish women in the political, economic, and social spheres.

Moreover, gender studies researcher Alicia Romero López compares Hernández's Inspector Santana character with other female detectives created by authors such as Alicia Giménez Bartlett (with her character Petra Delicado), Blanca Álvarez González (with Bárbara Villalta), Isabel Franc (with Emma García), Rosa Ribas Moliné (with Cornelia Weber-Tejedor), Rosa Montero (with Bruna Husky), Dolores Redondo (with Amaia Salazar), Susana Martín Gijón (with Annika Kaunda); as well as the series of novels about detective Sonia Ruiz written by various authors, such as Lorenzo Silva and Noemí Trujillo, Andreu Martín, Esteban Navarro, and Claudio Cerdán. Romero López also mentions the series of novels written by Antonio Santos Mercero about the character Sofía Luna, the first transgender police inspector in Spanish literature.

== Novels ==
=== Inspector Santana series ===
- Curvas peligrosas (Odisea Editorial, 2010, ISBN 9788415294306) (in Spanish)
- Contra las cuerdas (Editorial Alrevés, 2012, ISBN 9788415098720) (in Spanish)
- Cuentas pendientes (Editorial Alrevés, 2015, ISBN 9788416328215) (in Spanish)

=== Standalone novels ===
- La casa roja (Literaturas Com Libros LcL, 2013, ISBN 9788415414681) (in Spanish)
- La puta que leía a Jack Kerouac (Lesrain 2007; Literaturas Com Libros LcL, 2012, ISBN 9788415414339) (in Spanish)
- Males decisions (Editorial Alrevés, 2017, ISBN 9788417077198) (in Catalan)
- La reina del punk: La enigmática y sorprendente historia de amor y rock de la groupie que vivió a mil por hora y se convirtió en leyenda (Redbook Ediciones, 2018, ISBN 978-84-948799-8-2) (in Spanish)
- Los miércoles salvajes (Editorial Milenio, 2019, ISBN 978-8497438568) (in Spanish)
- Mai més (Editorial Alrevés, 2020, ISBN 978-84-17847-37-1) (in Catalan)
- Cerveza Mexicana (Extravertida editorial, 2021, ISBN 978-8412335989) (in Spanish)

== Anthologies ==
Hernández has participated in major short story anthologies in the noir genre:

- Elles també maten, Anna Maria Villalonga (ed.) (Llibres del Delicte, 2014, ISBN 978-84-941064-1-5) (in Catalan)
- Fundido en negro. (Antología de relatos del mejor calibre criminal femenino), Inmaculada Pertusa (ed.) (Editorial Alrevés, 2014, ISBN 978-84-15900-50-4) (in Spanish)
- Diez negritos, nuevas voces del género negro español, Àlex Martín Escribà and Javier Sánchez Zapatero (eds.) (Editorial Alrevés, 2015, ISBN 9788415900979) (in Spanish)
- Obscena. Trece relatos pornocriminales, Juan Ramón Biedma (ed.) (Editorial Alrevés, 2016, ISBN 978-84-16328-55-0) (in Spanish)
- Barcelona, viatge a la perifèria criminal, Àlex Martín Escribà and Sebastià Bennasar i Llobera (eds.) (Editorial Alrevés, 2017, ISBN 978-84-17077-17-4) (in Catalan)
- La cervesa de la Highsmith (Pagès Editors, 2021, ISBN 978-84-1303-232-0) (in Catalan)

== Awards ==
- Versales Lesbian Poetry award (2009)
- Katharsis award for novel (2009), finalist
- Valencia Negra festival (2013), finalist for best novel for Contra las cuerdas
- Ciudad de Sant Adrià (2015), for La casa roja
- Cubelles Noir (2016), for the best crime novel written in Spanish by a woman and published in 2015, for Cuentas pendientes
- Cubelles Noir (2018), for the best crime novel written in Catalan in 2017, for Males decisions
- Ciudad de Lebrija (2021), for Cerveza mexicana

== See also ==
- LGBT literature in Spain
- Noir fiction
- Detective fiction

== Bibliography ==
- Aramburu, Diana (2019). Resisting Invisibility: Detecting the Female Body in Spanish Crime Fiction. Toronto: University of Toronto Press. ISBN 978-1-4875-0459-5.
- Godsland, Shelley (2007). Killing Carmens: Women's Crime Fiction from Spain. Cardiff: University of Wales Press. ISBN 9780708320167.
- Lores Torres, Milagros (2022). "Rebeca Santana, una detective "queer" (El valor performativo del personaje de Susana Hernández)" [Rebeca Santana, a queer detective (The performative value of Susana Hernández's character)]. In Romero Morales, Yasmina; Cabrera Castro, Paula (eds.). Amor impossibilis: textos y pretextos de escritoras españolas (s. xx-xxi) [Impossible love: texts and pretexts of Spanish women writers (20th-21st century)] (in Spanish). Seville: Ediciones Alfar. pp. 315–331. ISBN 9788478989461.
- Paris-Huesca, Eva (2013). "Curvas peligrosas en el contexto de los feminismos del nuevo milenio" [Dangerous curves in the context of feminism of the new millennium]. Polifonía Scholarly Journal (in Spanish). III (1). Clarksville, Tennessee: Austin Peay State University. ISSN 2165-994X.
- Pertusa, Inmaculada (2014). "7. Nuevas detectives lesbianas para un nuevo milenio" [New lesbian detectives for a new millennium]. In Fernández Ulloa, Teresa (ed.). Otherness in Hispanic Culture (in Spanish). Newcastle upon Tyne: Cambridge Scholars Publishing. pp. 105–121. ISBN 978-1-4438-5389-7.
- Romero López, Alicia (30 November 2020). El personaje de la investigadora en la narrativa policiaca peninsular [The character of the female investigator in the peninsular crime fiction narrative] (PhD thesis) (in Spanish). Madrid: Complutense University of Madrid.
