= The Spanish Sleuth =

The Spanish Sleuth: The Detective in Spanish Fiction is a non-fiction book by Patricia Hart, published by Fairleigh Dickinson University Press and Associated University Presses in 1987.

Tracy Rutledge, the author of a PhD thesis, described the book as "the first book-length study published on Spain’s detective fiction".

== Background ==
The Instituto de Cooperación Iberoamericana gave Hart a grant so she could research the subject in Spain. Hart did this for a period of one year.

== Contents ==
"Detective Beginnings in Spain," the introduction, discusses works from 1953. Most of the following thirteen chapters cover one author each, except for the last two which cover multiple people.

The work includes a dictionary or glossary of slang terms that appear in the works of fiction. There are profiles of the fictional characters that appear in appendices in the books. The author conducted interviews with Spanish writers, had the interviews translated into English, and published the translations in the book. John W. Kronik of Cornell University called the detective dictionary "useful".

Each chapter discusses plot and fiction analysis. Some of the authors originated from Catalonia, and the book covers those who write in Catalan and in Castilian Spanish. Authors covered include Andreu Martín, Jaime Fuster, Lourdes Ortiz, Manuel de Predolo, Fernando Savater, and Manuel Vazquez Montalban.

== Reception ==
Benita J. Clarke of the University of Kentucky wrote that the book "reads very much like a detective novel." Clarke praised how the book makes the knowledge clear to a person who does not specialize in the genre.

Kronik criticized the author's analytical style, stating they "tend to be subjective and shallow", and he felt that a non-specialist reader would have difficulty with the work. He also criticized the publisher and editors for not giving the author proper editorial support.

Gonzalo Díaz-Migoyo of University of California, Davis wrote that the book may appeal to people who are fans of the genre, but not people who do not have as much interest in it.

Ilán Stavans of Columbia University stated that the book was "En suma, [...] un estudio poco riguroso y harto superficial en sus interpretaciones" (arguing there was a lack of rigor and in having interpretations of a superficial character).
