= Sue Glover =

Sue Glover may refer to:

- Sue Glover (singer) (born 1949), singer with British vocal duo Sue and Sunny
- Sue Glover (playwright) (born 1943), Scottish playwright

== See also ==
- Susan Glover, Canadian actress
