= Bhaskar Sunkara =

American writer (born 1989)

- Sunkara in 2018
- Born: June 20, 1989 (age 37); White Plains, New York, U.S.
- Education: George Washington University (BA)
- Occupations: Publisher; writer; editor
- Years active: 2010–present
- Title: Founder of Jacobin, president of The Nation.

Bhaskar Sunkara (born June 20, 1989) is an American political writer. He is the founding editor of Jacobin and the president of The Nation. He is a member and former vice-chair of the Democratic Socialists of America (DSA).

Sunkara wrote the book The Socialist Manifesto: The Case for Radical Politics in an Era of Extreme Inequality in 2019, and co-authored The Blueprint: How Socialism Can Work in the Real World in 2026. Sunkara advocates for a democratic socialist market economy controlled by workers, alongside social democratic government policies and public banks. He espouses leftist but relatively moderate social views, and anti-imperialist views on foreign policy.

== Early life ==
Sunkara was born in the United States to parents of Indian ancestry who had immigrated to the US from Trinidad and Tobago a year before he was born. His father was a Telugu migrant from Andhra Pradesh while his mother's family had migrated to the island in the 19th century as indentured labourers from Punjab and Bihar.

Sunkara credits his politicization to his reading as a teenager. From George Orwell's Nineteen Eighty-Four and Animal Farm, he developed an interest in Leon Trotsky, reading his autobiography and Isaac Deutscher's three-volume biography. He then progressed to the New Left, including thinkers such as Lucio Magri, Ralph Miliband, Perry Anderson and the journal New Left Review.

Sunkara joined the Democratic Socialists of America at the age of 17, becoming editor of the DSA youth section's blog The Activist. He went on to study history at George Washington University in Washington, D.C., where he conceived the idea of Jacobin. After his sophomore year, he missed two semesters due to illness, during which time he read Marxist works.

== Career ==
By the summer of 2010, Sunkara was preparing to return to his studies. He launched Jacobin in September of that year and in print at the beginning of 2011. Sunkara described Jacobin as a radical publication, "largely the product of a younger generation not quite as tied to the Cold War paradigms that sustained the old leftist intellectual milieus like Dissent or New Politics".

The New York Times interviewed Sunkara in January 2013, commenting on Jacobin's unexpected success and engagement with mainstream liberalism. In late 2014, he was interviewed by New Left Review on the political orientation and future trajectory of the publication and in March 2016 was featured in a lengthy Vox profile. In 2017, Sunkara became the publisher of Catalyst: A Journal of Theory and Strategy, a more theory-focused socialist journal published by Jacobin.

Sunkara writes for Vice magazine, The New York Times, The Washington Post, Vox, Foreign Policy, and The Nation, among other outlets. He has appeared on the PBS Tavis Smiley program, MSNBC's Up with Chris Hayes, and the FX show Totally Biased with W. Kamau Bell. Sunkara wrote The Socialist Manifesto: The Case for Radical Politics in an Era of Extreme Inequality in 2019 and co-authored The Blueprint: How Socialism Can Work in the Real World with Ben Burgis and Mike Beggs in 2026.

On February 23, 2022, The Nation named Sunkara to the role of president, replacing Erin O'Mara. In June 2023, Sunkara led The Nation's relaunch of Bookforum magazine.

== Political views ==
=== Economic views ===
Sunkara identifies as a Marxist. He supports a long-term market socialist or democratic socialist approach to the economy. He believes that workers should control firms and private property, compete in markets (which he says are not inherently capitalist), and receive financing from public banks. He says every worker at a firm should receive a minimum income, in addition to a share of the firm's profits, democratically apportioned by worker's councils. In The Socialist Manifesto, Sunkara proposes a system similar to the Yugoslav work-point system, which would limit the pay disparity between managers and employees. Sunkara supports workplace democracy.

Sunkara believes in selective nationalizations, including of the "commanding heights of the economy". He said socialists should aim to "abolish market dependence" by decommodifying "the basic infrastructures of human life", such as healthcare, education, transportation, energy, housing, and communications. However, in The Blueprint, Sunkara and co-authors Burgis and Beggs rejected complete economic planning like that of the Soviet Union. Sunkara has also criticized socialists who he sees as settling for social democracy instead of pushing for a post-capitalist society.

He has called for redistributive policies, including increased corporate taxes and a general increase of taxes, especially on billionaires and the wealthy. Sunkara supports "finding ways to control the wealth and power of billionaires and large corporations", and has argued that the existence of billionaires is the product of an immoral society.

=== Social views ===
Sunkara has described himself as a leftist, though commentators have noted he has more moderate social views than some in DSA. Arash Azizi wrote in The Atlantic that Sunkara, along with Burgis, Eric Blanc, and Representative Alexandria Ocasio-Cortez, represented a mainstream "economically rigorous and democratically committed socialism", in contrast to "DSA's sectarians", who he framed as supporting Mao Zedong and Hamas.

Sunkara claimed there's been "a sort of reconciliation of liberalism and socialism" among American socialists following the fall of the Soviet Union, and argued that many communist members of DSA were truly invoking the anarchist tradition. Sunkara said that increased incidents of political violence in the United States and the responses to them were small steps towards illiberalism across the political spectrum.

Sunkara said that "America was the most racist country in the history of the world, and I think the left actually does a great discredit to its own history when it pretends like it still is". He said that the American Civil War was led by the left to abolish slavery, and that socialists played a major role in the fight against the Jim Crow laws. Sunkara has criticized identity politics, saying the left should oppose discrimination when it arises and support equal rights, but ultimately have a universalist message of "building institutions that improve people's lives". He supports abolishing United States Immigration and Customs Enforcement. He supports retaining the police and wants further restrictions on alcohol, marijuana, pornography, and gambling, though without outright bans. However, he opposes police violence and mass incarceration. Sunkara supports a Green New Deal, subsidized abortion, and LGBT+ rights.

=== Contemporary politics ===
Sunkara supported Senator Bernie Sanders' 2016 and 2020 presidential campaigns. Following Sanders' loss in the 2020 Democratic Party presidential primaries, Sunkara said Sanders would join Martin Luther King Jr., Eugene Debs, and Mother Jones as "moral leaders against the great evils of their day". Sunkara strongly supported Zohran Mamdani's 2025 New York City mayoral campaign, though said socialists "must be sober" about the challenges Mamdani would face as mayor. In 2026, he wrote an opinion piece urging Ocasio-Cortez to run for president in 2028.

Sunkara opposes Israel in the Israeli-Palestinian conflict, and has expressed support for Palestinian self-determination. He described Northern Cyprus as a statelet occupied by Turkey, opposes the occupation of Western Sahara by Morocco, and opposes the American embargo against Cuba. He said that anti-imperialism and anti-militarism are and have historically been part of the American socialist movement.

Sunkara was strongly critical of Donald Trump's presidencies, and said Trumpism and democratic socialism both rose in response to increasing inequality in the United States. He also said Trump's election was partly a product of racism and sexism. Following Trump's loss in the 2020 United States presidential election, Sunkara warned that if Joe Biden governed as a "normal" Democrat like moderate presidents Bill Clinton and Barack Obama, "it won’t be long before we have to deal with the next Donald Trump".

In The Socialist Manifesto, Sunkara argued that the Constitution of the United States would hinder progress towards socialism, and called for abolishing the Senate, the electoral college, and federalism. He defended DSA's platform plank of abolishing the Senate, saying it was an undemocratic institution.

Sunkara supports the "dirty break" strategy of building up socialist power within the Democratic Party but breaking away in the future to form an independent party.

== Awards and recognition ==
In 2020, Sunkara was named to the Fortune "40 Under 40" list under the "Government and Politics" category.
