= Fanny Cottençon =

French actress

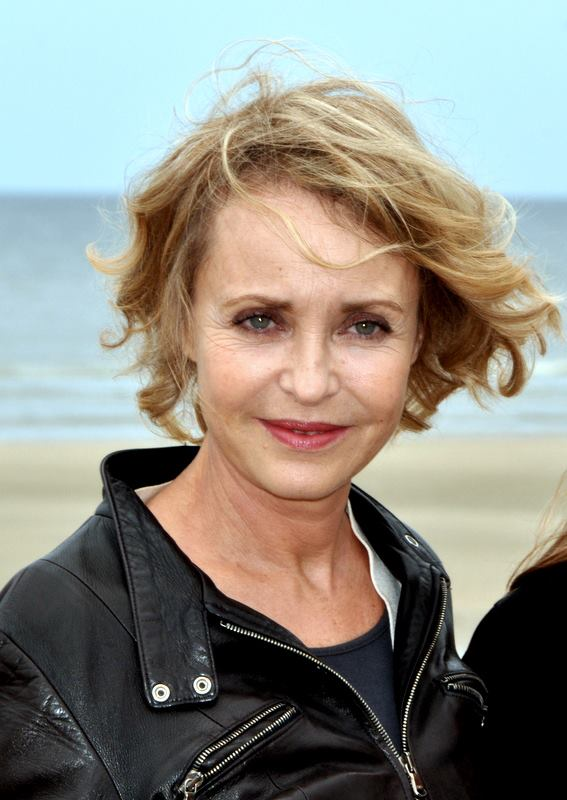
- Cottençon in 2012
- Born: 11 May 1957 (age 68); Port-Gentil, French Equatorial Africa
- Occupations: Actress; film producer
- Years active: 1975–present
- Awards: César Award for Best Supporting Actress; Ordre des Arts et des Lettres

Fanny Cottençon (born 11 May 1957) is a French actress and film producer, born in Port-Gentil, Gabon (then in French Equatorial Africa). In 1983 she won the César Award for Best Supporting Actress for her effort in the movie L'Étoile du Nord. In March 2017, she received the Ordre des Arts et des Lettres.

== Selected filmography ==
=== Film ===
Year	Title	Role	Notes
1981	Les Fourberies de Scapin	Hyacinthe	
1981	Signé Furax	Carole Hardy Petit	
1982	L'Étoile du Nord	Sylvie Baron	César Award for Best Supporting Actress
1983	L'Ami de Vincent	Nathalie	
1984	Fanny Straw Hair	Fanny	
1985	Monsieur de Pourceaugnac	Julie	
1985	Spécial Police	Julie	
1986	Golden Eighties	Lili	
1987	Killing Time	Martine	
1988	Gros Cœurs	Cléo Lemkowicz	
1988	Door on the Left as You Leave the Elevator	Florence Arnaud	
1991	Les Clés du paradis	Isabelle	
1997	L'Homme idéal	Claire	
1997	Ça reste entre nous	Agnès	
1999	Our Happy Lives	Cécile's mother	
2001	Change-moi ma vie	Nadine	
2004	Mariage mixte	Luce Zagury	
2007	Conversations with My Gardener	Hélène	
2007	Room of Death	Lucie's mother	
2013	Bright Days Ahead	Chantal	
2024	Paul & Paulette Take a Bath	Charlotte	

=== Television ===
Year	Title	Role	Notes
2006	L'Enfant du secret	Marie de l'Épée	Television film
2007	Lost Signs	Anne de Lestrade	Recurring role, 12 episodes
2016	Candice Renoir	Magda Muller	2 episodes

== Awards and honors ==
- 1983 César Awards Best Supporting Actress for L'Étoile du Nord
- Ordre des Arts et des Lettres (2017)
