= The Trout (film) =

1982 film by Joseph Losey

- Film poster
- Directed by: Joseph Losey
- Written by: Monique Lange; Joseph Losey
- Based on: The Trout (1964 novel) by Roger Vailland
- Produced by: Yves Rousset-Rouard
- Starring: Isabelle Huppert; Jean-Pierre Cassel; Daniel Olbrychski; Jacques Spiesser; Isao Yamagata; Jeanne Moreau
- Cinematography: Henri Alekan
- Edited by: Marie Castro-Vasquez
- Music by: Richard Hartley
- Production company: Gaumont; TF1 Films; SFPC
- Distributed by: Gaumont (France)
- Release dates: 4 September 1982 (Venice); 22 September 1982
- Running time: 105 minutes
- Country: France
- Language: French; Japanese; English
- Budget: $3 million

The Trout (French: La Truite) is a 1982 French drama film directed and co-written by Joseph Losey and starring Isabelle Huppert, Jean-Pierre Cassel, Daniel Olbrychski, Jacques Spiesser, Isao Yamagata, Jeanne Moreau and Craig Stevens in his final film role. It is based on Roger Vailland's 1964 novel.

The film premiered in-competition at the 39th Venice International Film Festival, and was released in France by Gaumont on 22 September 1982. It won Best Cinematography at the 8th César Awards, and was nominated for Best Production Design.

== Plot ==
Traumatized since her childhood, Frederique - nicknamed the Trout - retaliates against men by seducing them to exploit them without ever giving herself. She marries Galuchat, a homosexual, and lives for a while in Japan with Saint-Genis, a businessman whom she met at the same time as a rich couple, the Ramberts.

== Cast ==
- Isabelle Huppert as Frédérique
- Jean-Pierre Cassel as Rambert
- Jeanne Moreau as Lou
- Daniel Olbrychski as Saint-Genis
- Jacques Spiesser as Galuchat
- Isao Yamagata as Daigo Hamada
- Jean-Paul Roussillon as Verjon
- Roland Bertin as The Count
- Lisette Malidor as Mariline
- Craig Stevens as Carter
- Ruggero Raimondi as Party Guest
- Alexis Smith as Gloria
- Lucas Belvaux as Clerk
- Pierre Forget as Frédérique's father
- Ippo Fujikawa as Kumitaro
- Yûko Kada as Akiko
- Anne François as Air France Stewardess
- Pascal Morand as Lord

== Production ==
The Trout was originally planned to be released in the 1960s, with Brigitte Bardot in the lead role. Shooting took place on-location in France and Japan, and at Joinville Studios.

== Reception ==
=== Critical response ===
On Rotten Tomatoes, The Trout holds a rating of 60%, based on 10 reviews.

In a review for Film Comment, Elliott Stein called it "Losey's best film in a decade" and "plum pudding for auteurists."

Bob Baker for Time Out wrote, "Losey's penultimate film is one of his most assured, depicting with unusual objectivity the impact of a type of personality met with in life from time to time, but not often in the movies."

=== Awards and nominations ===
| Institution | Year | Category | Nominee | Result | Ref. |
|---|---|---|---|---|---|
| César Awards | 1983 | Best Cinematography | Henri Alekan | Won | |
| César Awards | 1983 | Best Production Design | Alexandre Trauner | Nominated | |
| Venice Film Festival | 1982 | Golden Lion | Joseph Losey | Nominated | |
