= Door on the Left as You Leave the Elevator =

- Directed by: Édouard Molinaro
- Written by: Gérard Lauzier
- Produced by: Claude Berri
- Starring: Pierre Richard; Emmanuelle Béart; Richard Bohringer; Fanny Cottençon
- Cinematography: Robert Fraisse
- Music by: Murray Head
- Distributed by: AMLF
- Release date: 1988
- Running time: 78 minutes
- Country: France
- Language: French

Door on the Left as You Leave the Elevator (French: À gauche en sortant de l'ascenseur) is a 1988 French comedy written by Gérard Lauzier (based on his play), directed by Édouard Molinaro, and starring Pierre Richard, Emmanuelle Béart, and Richard Bohringer.

== Plot ==
The plot is based around a successful, yet very shy painter Yann (Pierre Richard) who is in love with a married woman Florence (Fanny Cottençon). When he finally manages to have a date with her in his apartment, he has to face big problems. His neighbour Boris, another painter (and an artist maudit) who is extremely insecure and possessive towards his young wife Éva, leaves his flat without his suitcase, and when Éva, dressed only in lingerie, runs out of the door to let him know, a draft of air closes her door and she has to ask Yann for help. Unfortunately, that is just the moment when both Boris and Florence turn up. The story gets even more complicated as Florence's husband also comes to Yann's flat, and when Yann, when joking, mistakes a toy gun for a real one, and lightly injures Boris. But eventually all comes to a happy end.

== Cast ==
- Pierre Richard: Yann Ducoudray
- Emmanuelle Béart: Eva
- Richard Bohringer: Boris
- Fanny Cottençon: Florence Arnaud
- Pierre Vernier: Paul Arnaud
- Jean-Michel Dupuis: Jean-Yves
- Michel Creton: first policeman
- Éric Blanc: second policeman
- Édouard Molinaro: man by the elevator
