= Apaches (subculture) =

Parisian Belle Époque underworld subculture

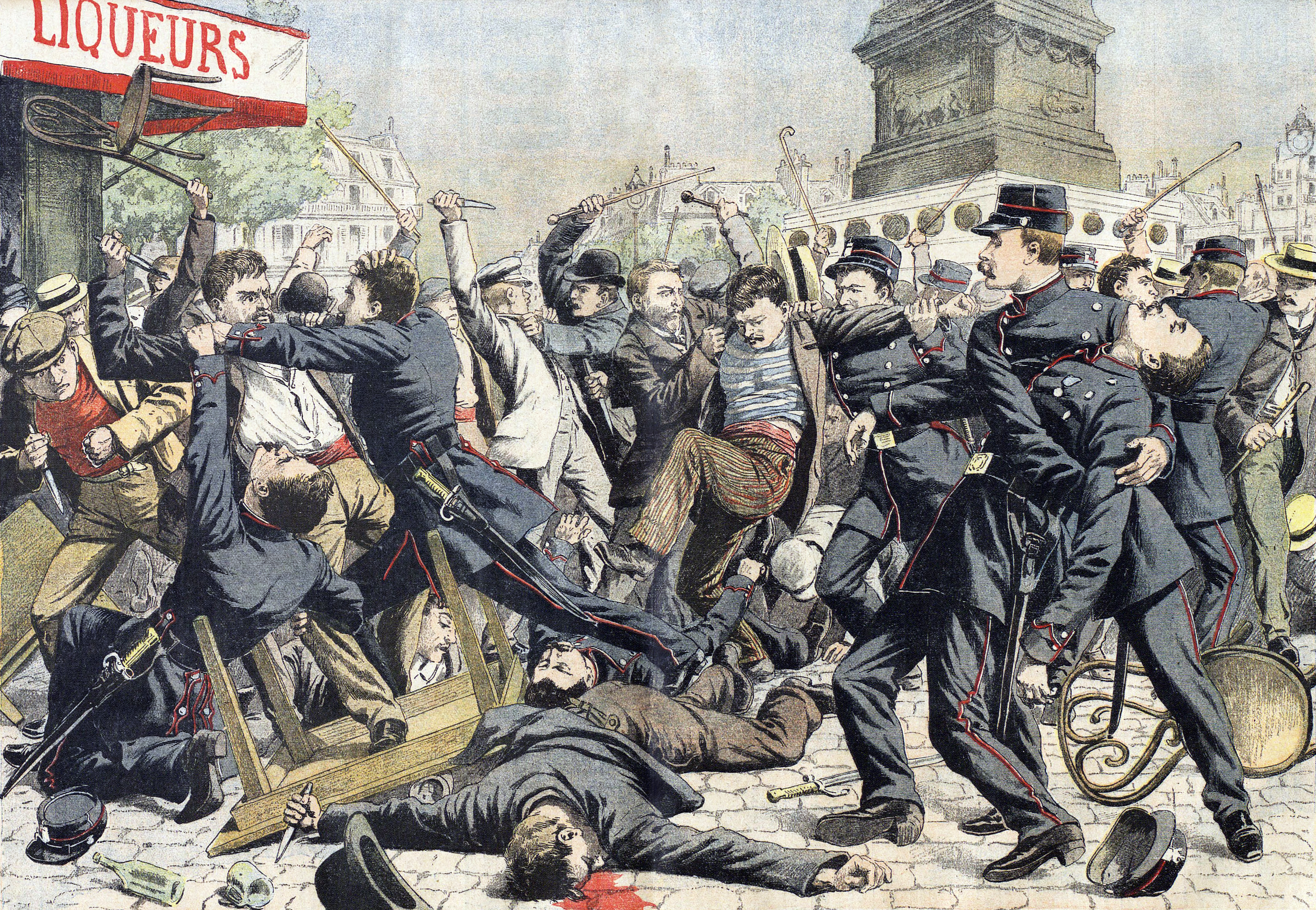
Le Petit Journal: Apaches battle Paris Police on 14 August 1904

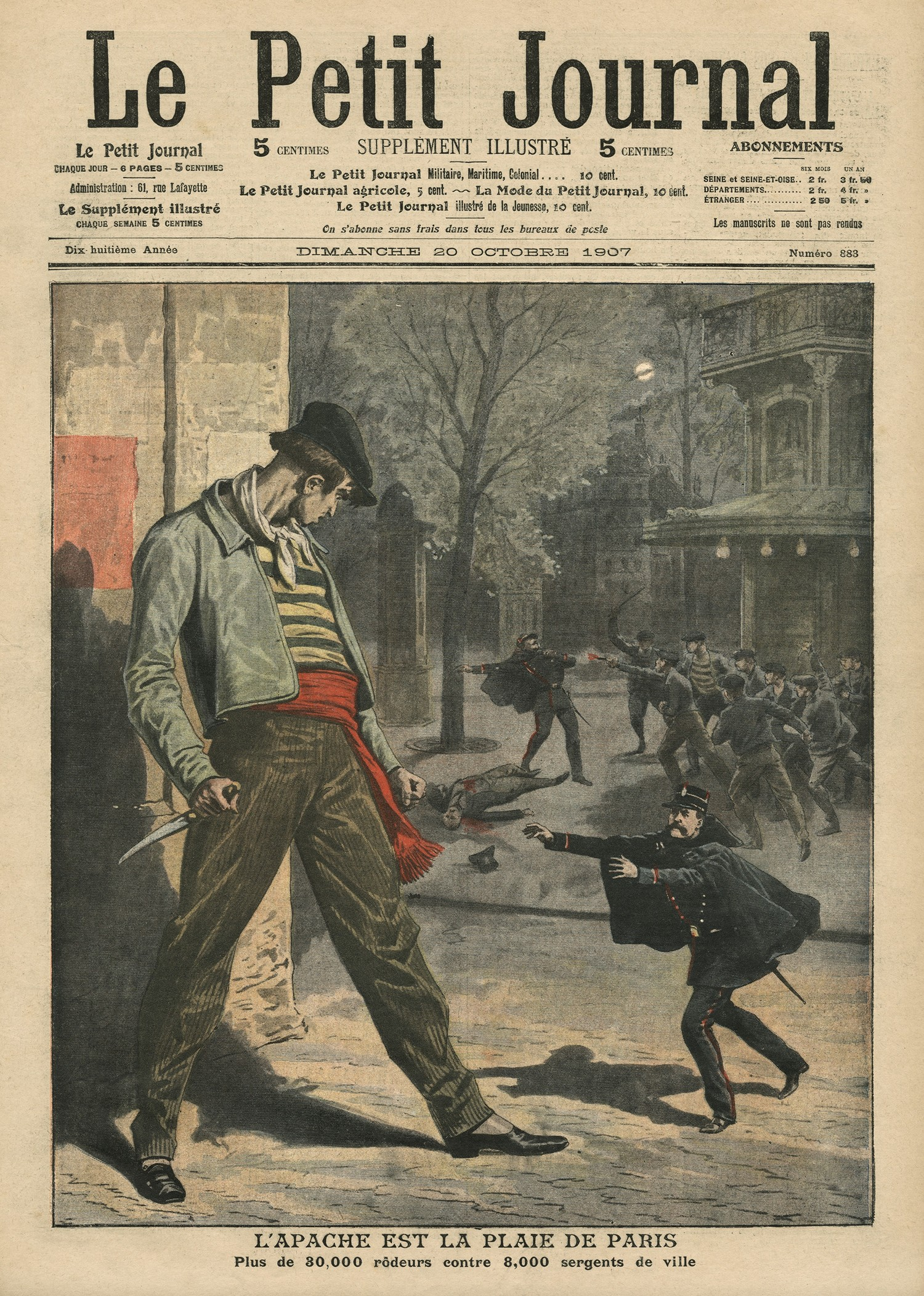
Title page of Le Petit Journal (20 October 1907): "The Apache is the sore of Paris. More than 30,000 prowlers against 8,000 city policemen."

Les Apaches (French: [lez‿apaʃ]) was a Parisian Belle Époque violent criminal underworld subculture of early 20th-century hooligans, night muggers, street gangs and other criminals. After news of their notoriety spread over Europe, the term was used to describe violent street crime in other countries as well; for example, "Russian apaches".

== Name ==
There are a number of stories about the origin of the term "Apaches", the common thread being that this was a comparison of their savagery with that attributed by Europeans to the Native American tribes of Apaches.

A 1904 issue of the French Q&A magazine L'Intermédiaire des chercheurs et curieux credited a journalist named Victor Moris with the popularization of the term. In November 1900 a police inspector of the Belleville district of police was describing to him a particularly bloody scene and concluded with the words: "C'est un véritable truc d'Apaches!".

A story in a 1910 Sunday supplement of Le Petit Journal claimed that when a certain gang leader nicknamed Terreur (Terror) heard that the actions of the band were compared with these of the Apaches, he was so pleased that he proceeded to call his gang "Apaches of Belleville".

== Description ==
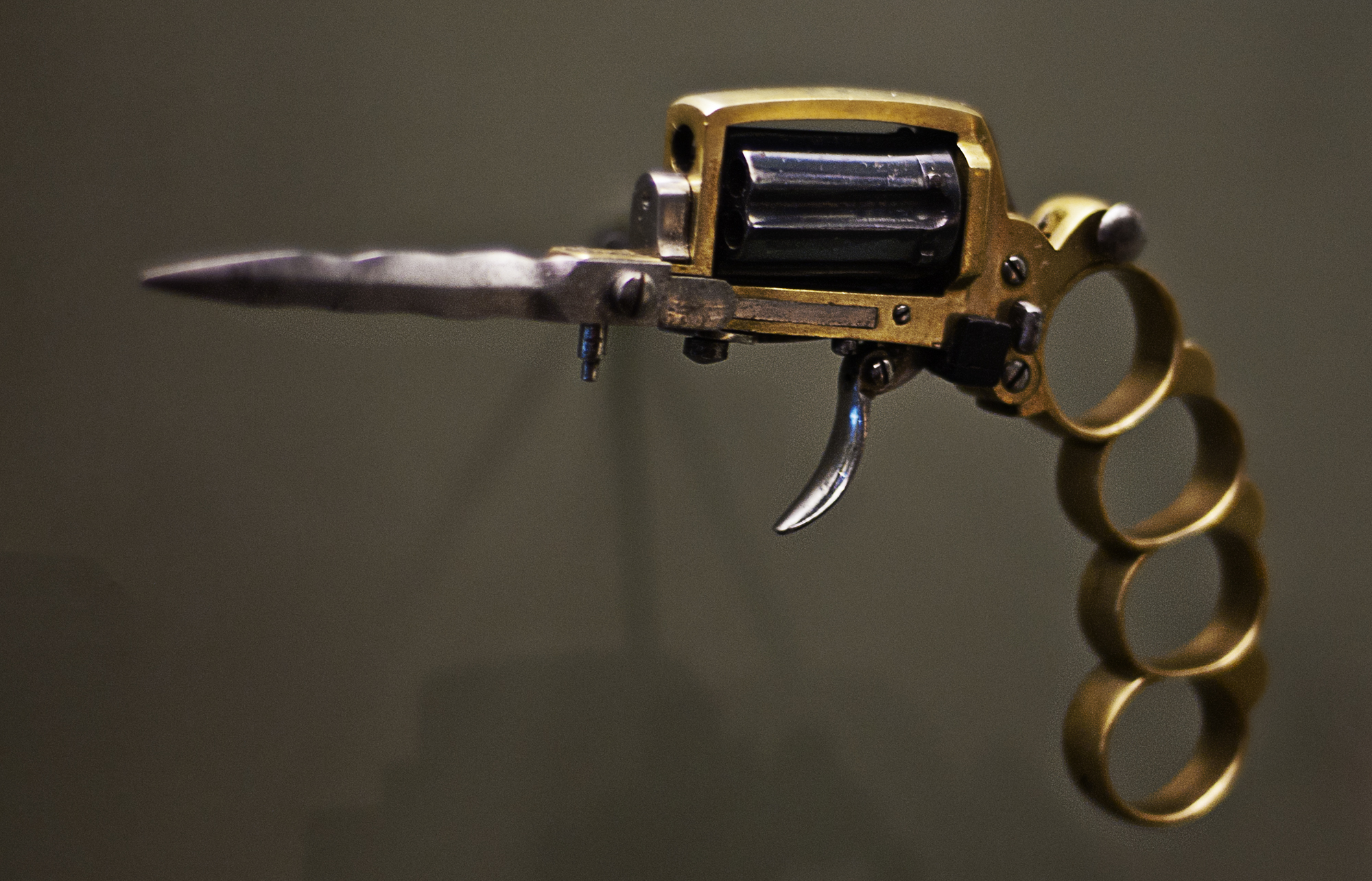
Apache revolver – Curtius Museum, Liège

During their heyday, the prospect of being mugged or otherwise assaulted by Apache gangsters was especially feared by members of the emergent bourgeois.

Some of the gangs used a unique type of pistol which was named the "Apache revolver" or "Apache pistol": a pinfire cartridge pepperbox revolver with no barrel, a set of foldover brass knuckles for a handgrip, and a folding knife mounted right underneath the revolver drum.

The Apaches also developed a semi-codified collection of "tricks" used in mugging and hand-to-hand combat. The most famous was the coup du Père François, a tactic by which a victim was stalked by several Apaches. One garroted the victim from behind while taking him piggyback to prevent struggling; another Apache was assigned the job of searching through the victim's pockets for any valuables, while another served as a lookout. Although the intent was to only incapacitate, death from prolonged strangulation could still occur.

== Disappearance ==
The existence of Apaches as a semi-organised gang-culture in Paris during the early 1900s was exaggerated in media coverage, although it did reflect the reality of a higher proportion of young males among the city population than elsewhere in France. With the outbreak of World War I in August 1914 the wholesale mobilisation of this generation for military service led to a reduction of violent street crime and the subsequent fading of Apache mythology. After 1919 the incidence of urban violence returned to pre-war levels but without such symbols supposedly favoured by Apaches, such as the wearing of coloured sashes or the carrying of specially designed weapons.

== Cultural influence ==
Certain elements of the Apache "style" became influential in French and then international popular culture, including the Apache dance and Apache shirt. Classes were offered in "la langue verte", the colourful argot spoken by Apache gangsters.

Pierre Decourcelle's play Gigolette (slang for young prostitute) (1893) was based on the story of a love triangle between prostitute Amelie Elie and members of the Apache gang, Joseph Pleigneur and Dominique Francois Eugéne Lecac. At least two film versions followed decades later. Casque d'Or, the 1952 film by Jacques Becker, tells the story of a young demi-mondaine mixed up with a Belleville street gang.

The famous French 10-part seven-hour silent film Les Vampires (1915, re-released on DVD in 2005) is about an Apache gang named "the Vampires". Emilio Ghione's La Mort series of films—of which only I topi grigi (The grey rats, 1918), Anime buie (Dark souls, 1916) and a fragment of Dollari e Fracks (Dollars and dinner jackets, 1919) still exist—was about the adventures of a 'noble' Apache in the Parisian underworld and further afield.

The German silent film The Apache of Marseilles (1919), directed by Ewald André Dupont, is a thriller that aims to show the violent criminal subculture of the Apaches.

The popular Italian pulp fiction writer Aristide Marino Gianella also wrote a serial novel called Gli apache parigini, which was first available in short installments and then within a complete volume.

In his book In Search of Lost Time, the French novelist and essayist Marcel Proust uses the bellicose practices of the Apache gang as an illustration of the sort of duplicitous survival instincts of nation states which wage wars, or make threats of war, out of fear of losing their sovereignty.

In his 1916 poem, “The Man From Athabaska” Robert W. Service mentions one of the WW I comrades serving alongside him is “…an Apache from Montmartre…”

The Apaches are briefly mentioned in the 1924 Sherlock Holmes short story "The Adventure of the Illustrious Client".

In the 1932 film Love Me Tonight, Maurice Chevalier sings the song "I'm an Apache", about the life of an Apache gangster.

In the 2023 film Apaches: Gang of Paris, the titular characters are Apaches members.
