= Fanny Straw Hair =

Fanny Pelopaja
- Theatrical release poster
- Directed by: Vicente Aranda
- Written by: Vicente Aranda
- Produced by: Carlos Durán
- Starring: Fanny Cottençon; Bruno Cremer
- Cinematography: Juan Amorós
- Edited by: Teresa Font
- Music by: Manuel Camp
- Distributed by: Lola Films; Carlton Films Export
- Release dates: 2 July 1984 (Spain); 29 August 1984 (France)
- Running time: 100 minutes
- Countries: Spain; France
- Languages: Spanish; French

Fanny Straw Hair (Spanish: Fanny Pelopaja; in France as French: À coups de crosse) is a 1984 crime thriller film, directed by Vicente Aranda and starring Fanny Cottençon and Bruno Cremer. The film, a Spanish and French production, was based on the novel Prótesis, written by Andreu Martin. The plot follows an attractive blonde outcast who devises an elaborate plan to avenge the humiliation she suffered at the hands of a policeman who killed her boyfriend and smashed her teeth with the butt of a gun.

== Plot ==
Estefania Sánchez, known as Fanny Pelopaja for her bleach blond hair, is a cold-blooded woman who recently has been released from jail after serving a three-year sentence. She has built up a new life for herself working in a gas station. However, she has been waiting all this time to take revenge from a corrupt and brutal police officer, Andrés Gallego. A phone call from one of her old cronies informs her that Andrés is working in Barcelona as a security guard for an armored car company. Fanny leaves everything behind and takes the road back to Barcelona.

A flashback tells the story of Fanny and Andrés three years before. He caught her stealing in a department store in which he worked as an undercover security officer. Although she paid for the stolen items and was let off without being charged, Andrés, a corrupt policeman, pressed Fanny to have sex with him. A married man with a wife he despised and two teenage children who do not pay attention to him, Andrés quickly became obsessed with Fanny, and they met regularly in the same hotel room for casual sex. An unwilling love-hate relationship built up between them. Andrés willingly guided Fanny in a risky plan to help Fanny's boyfriend, Manuel, nicknamed The Cat, to escape from the hospital where he was recuperating after being injured in jail.

Fanny smuggled a gun in the hospital room between her legs. With the gun in hand, Fanny and Manuel managed to escape from the hospital, but they killed two policemen. They found refuge from the authorities in an abandoned house on the outskirts of the city. There, a jealous dispute between Andrés and Manuel ended up with Andrés shooting Manuel in the head, killing him. Grief-stricken, Fanny, told Andrés how much she hated him. Andrés brutally assaulted her, knocking out her teeth, causing her to have to wear dentures from then on.

Because of his violation of police regulations and his abusive treatment of Fanny, Andrés was thrown out of the police force and spent some time in a mental institution recuperating from a nervous breakdown. He now works as a guard for an armored car company.

Back in Barcelona, Fanny is reunited with her old friends, Julián and his girlfriend, La Nena, Manuel's sister. Their plan is to rob the armored car that Andrés is guarding. While Julián is interested only in the money, both Fanny and La Nena want to kill Andrés for revenge. The plans work out, and Fanny exacts revenge on Andrés, but does not kill him. A mistake, because he is soon back in full force against her and her companions. After brutally beating Julián and threatening to rape La Nena with his gun, Julián reveals Fanny's whereabouts. She has been waiting for Andrés all along in the same hotel room where they used to get together in the past. When he arrives, she is ready for him. They aim their guns at each other but neither dares to shoot. When the police arrive, they find them naked in bed, Andrés fatally stabbed in the back. Fanny is still alive, but in a catatonic state from which she never recovers. Ultimately she is institutionalized in a mental asylum.

== Cast ==
- Fanny Cottençon as Estefania Sánchez, "Fanny Pelopaja"
- Bruno Cremer as Andrés Gallego
- Ian Sera as Manuel, " the cat"
- Francisco Algora as Julián
- Berta Cabré as La Nena

== Production ==
Spanish producer Carlos Durán approached director Vicente Aranda showing him the novel Prótesis, written by Andreu Matín, with the idea of making a film out of it. Aranda liked the book but found difficult to write the screenplay. The novel portrays a violent relationship between two men. Aranda had been uncomfortable tackling the subject of homosexuality in his previous film Cambio de Sexo therefore he decided to transform the male protagonist into a female and make the story of love and revenge between a heterosexual couple. The violence, bluntly expressed in the novel, was also tuned down in the film adaptation. The author of the original book, Andreu Martin agreed with the changes made and he was pleased with the film adaptation.

Casting the female lead, Aranda considered Berta Socuéllamos, who had had her breakthrough in films with a similar role in Carlos Saura's Deprisa, Deprisa. He also had in mind Victoria Abril, his favorite actress, for the starring role. However the French producers of the film imposed two French actors in the lead to help the marketability of the film in France. Aranda had a casting session in Paris and ultimately choose Fanny Cottençon and Bruno Cremer for the two main roles. The film had a budget of 76 million pesetas with 70% Spanish capital and 30% of the cost covered by the French production company.

Shot in Barcelona with Spanish supporting cast and crew, the production went smoothly and the director was happy with the actors in the lead who were dubbed in Spanish for the local version of the film. However, dissatisfied with the French cut and dubbing of the film, done without his oversight, Aranda tried unsuccessfully to stop the premiere of the film in France, where it was released with the title Á coups de crosse.

== Title ==
Prótesis, the original title of the book, which makes reference to dentures that the main character has to wear, was avoided having little commercial appeal. Fanny Strawhair, the final title given to the film, came from the name of Fanny Cottençon, the actress playing the lead and from her bleached blond hair.

== Reception ==
Fanny Pelopaja received good reviews from the critics, but failed to find an audience when first released. 180.000 tickets were sold in Spain and made 44 million pesetas. However the film found popularity once released on video, and with time, it has become one of Aranda best-regarded works.

Kevin Thomas of the Los Angeles Times called the film "silly and overbaked".

== DVD release ==
Fanny Pelopaja is available in Region 2 DVD.
