= E. Susana Hernández =

Argentine physicist

Susana Ester Hernández (published as E. Susana Hernández) is an Argentine physicist whose research has concerned the wetting behavior of liquid helium droplets on surfaces. She is an emeritus professor of physics at the University of Buenos Aires.

== Education and career ==
Hernández earned a licenciate in physics through the University of Buenos Aires in 1970. She continued at the University of Buenos Aires for a doctorate, completed in 1973. However, she was removed from the university staff in 1974 under the rectorship of Alberto Eduardo Ottalagano, newly installed in that position as a supporter of Juan Perón.

She has held a permanent position as a researcher for the National Scientific and Technical Research Council (CONICET) since 1973, promoted to senior researcher in 2004. In 1976 she was given an interim associate professorship at the National Technological University – Buenos Aires Regional Faculty. In 1983 she was restored to the University of Buenos Aires, working from 1983 to 1988 as a full-time associate professor and interim full professor of physics. She became a full professor by examination in 1988 and a plenary full professor in 1998. She retired as an emeritus professor in 2012.

== Recognition ==
Hernández was named as a Fellow of the American Physical Society (APS) in 2006, after a nomination from the APS Forum on International Physics, "for her contributions to international physics, including remarkably diverse scientific contributions derived from her continuing efforts to bring together researchers from different areas and disciplines with particular emphasis on young scientists". She has been an honorary member of the Physical Association of Argentina since 2010.

She was the recipient of the 2010 Rebeca Gerschman Prize of the Ministry of Science, Technology, and Innovation.
