= La Balance =

1982 French film by Bob Swaim

- Poster
- Directed by: Bob Swaim
- Produced by: Alexandre Mnouchkine; Georges Dancigers
- Cinematography: Bernard Zitzermann
- Edited by: Françoise Javet
- Music by: Roland Bocquet
- Production companies: Les Films Ariane; Films A2
- Distributed by: Acteurs Auteurs Associés
- Release date: 10 November 1982
- Running time: 103 min.
- Country: France
- Language: French
- Budget: $1.2 million
- Box office: $31.4 million

La Balance (U.S. title: The Nark; literal translation: The Informer) is a 1982 French film directed by Bob Swaim. It stars Nathalie Baye, Philippe Léotard, Tchéky Karyo, Maurice Ronet, and Jean-Paul Comart. It won the César Award for Best Film, Best Actor, and Best Actress, and was nominated for Most Promising Actor (twice), Best Director, Best Original Screenplay, and Best Editing. The film had a total of 4,192,189 admissions in France, becoming the fifth highest-grossing film of the year.

== Plot ==
Nicole is a sex worker in Paris. Her former racketeer boyfriend and pimp, Dédé, has been excluded from the business of a local mob boss, Roger Massina, because of a romantic dispute over Nicole. When a police informant is killed, the police decide to recruit Dédé as a replacement. The police raid Dédé's apartment, find a gun, and blackmail him into becoming an informant using this and other threats.

The police want to get to Massina and try to use Dédé to do it. Dédé agrees to participate in a set-up and tries to return to Massina's favor by telling him about a rich antique dealer he has found to rob (actually part of the set-up), and asking for help. Massina, tempted by greed, agrees and begins to reintegrate Dédé into his organization.

On the day of the heist, Dédé is replaced by Massina's unhinged henchman, Petrovic. Dédé attempts to call off the police plan, but officer Le Belge, wearing headphones, does not hear him and proceeds with the operation. As Le Belge blocks Massina's van, Petrovic becomes suspicious and opens fire, killing civilians and nearly killing Le Belge—who is saved by his Walkman, which absorbs a bullet. Massina escapes, but Petrovic is chased and ultimately shot in the head by Le Capitaine after killing an officer. The captain then instructs his team to reload Petrovic's weapon.

Dédé is cornered by Massina in an alley, but manages to overpower and shoot him. Fearing retaliation, Dédé hides. Nicole, believing he is safer in custody, informs the police, who arrest him. She watches and weeps from a car as he is taken away.

== Cast ==
- Nathalie Baye as Nicole Danet
- Philippe Léotard as Dédé Laffont
- Richard Berry as Mathias Palouzi
- Christophe Malavoy as Tintin
- Maurice Ronet as Massina
- Tchéky Karyo as Petrovic
- Jean-Paul Comart as The Belgian
- Bernard Freyd as The Captain
- Albert Dray as Carlini
- Florent Pagny as Simoni
- Jean-Daniel Laval as Arnaud
- Luc-Antoine Diquero as Picard
- Anne-Claude Salimo as Sabrina
- Sam Karmann as Paulo Sanchez
- François Berléand as Inspector de la Mondaine
