= Amélie Élie =

French prostitute (1878–1933)

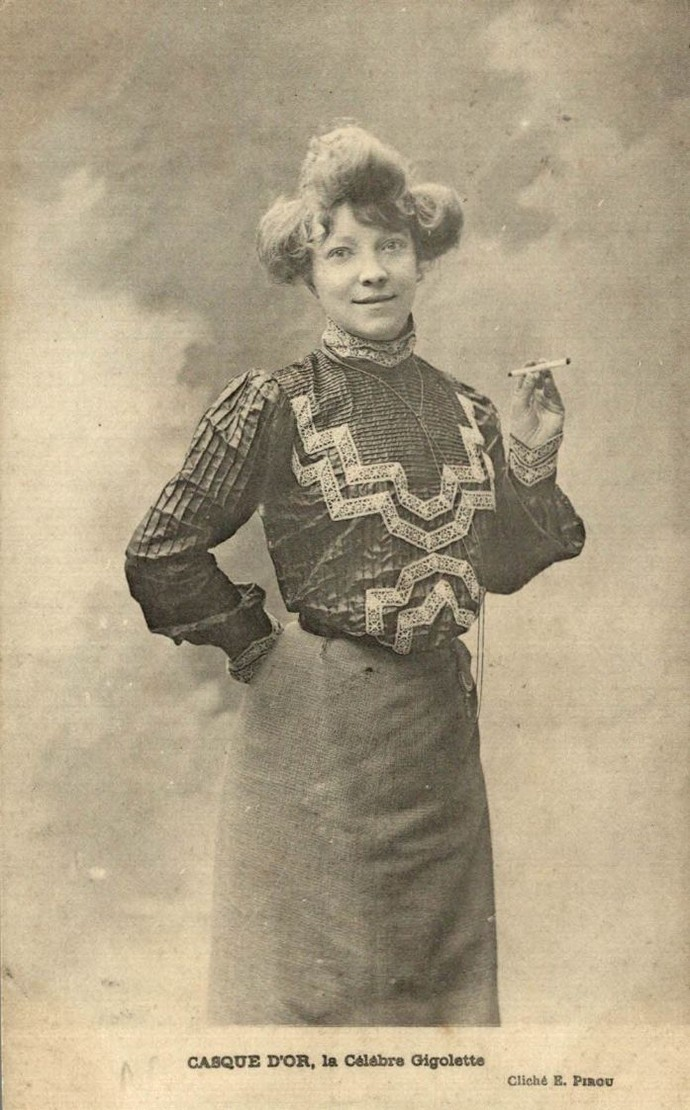
- Born: 14 March 1878; Orléans, France
- Died: 6 April 1933 (aged 55)
- Spouse: André Alexandre Nardin (married 17 January 1917)
- Parents: Gustave Jean Élie (father); Marie-Louise Delacourtie (mother)

Amélie Élie (14 March 1878 – 6 April 1933) was a French prostitute, also known as a gigolette. She gained fame under the nickname "Casque d'Or" ("Golden Helmet") due to a violent feud about her between two French Apaches from rivaling gangs in the Parisian underworld. The trial following the feud, which was reported on by mass media, turned Élie into a public sensation. In 1952, the film Casque d'Or fictionalized Élie's story.

== Early life ==
Amélie Élie was born on 14 March 1878, at 3am in Orléans, France, although she later stated her birthday as 17 June 1879. She was born at Hotel Dieu to Gustave Jean Élie, a tinsmith, and Marie-Louise Delacourtie. Later on, her parents moved to the 11th arrondissement located in Paris, France, an industrial area with many artisans. The inhabitants of the 11th arrondissement were mainly working-class families at the time. The relatively poor living conditions often led to a lower life expectancy for children, and lower quality of life for residents.

At age 13, Élie fell in love with a boy two years her senior and they ran off together to a hotel. After running away several more times, her parents gave up on her and Élie found herself on her own in the streets of Paris.

During this time, she met a woman named Helene de Courtille, a prostitute with high-paying clients. Courtille introduced Élie to the trade, and acted as a mentor. Later Élie encountered a man named Bouchon, who henceforth acted as her pimp and provided protection for her. However, Bouchon was prone to violence and set unrealistic daily quotas for her. After a particularly aggressive fight, Élie escaped.

== The feud over Casque d'Or ==
After Élie had decided to leave Bouchon, she met a man named Joseph Pleigneur, better known as Manda, who offered her protection. Manda was 22 years old and the leader of one of the more prominent gangs in Paris at the time. In his attempt to claim Élie as his own, he stabbed Bouchon. The action was meant as a statement of power and as retribution for Bouchon's poor treatment of Élie. Although their relationship appeared stable initially, Manda had his own vices, often left Élie on her own for long periods of time and frequently saw other women. In addition, Élie led a lifestyle that his income could not maintain. Eventually Élie was fed up and left Manda. Élie leaving Manda motivated him to become the leader of his Apache gang, Les Orteaux, to prove his worth to her.

Taking to the streets again, Élie met Dominique Francois Eugéne Lecac, who generally went by Leca. This new relationship made Manda jealous and he attacked Leca repeatedly. In 1902, Manda and other Orteaux members stabbed Leca in a cab. Eventually Leca was found with two gun shots and a knife wound and was rushed to the hospital. Following with the custom of Apache men to stay quiet and not reveal any other gang members' names, Leca did not answer any of the police's questions about the attack. After Leca left the hospital, Manda and his men tried to attack again, but were apprehended by the police.

Throughout the feud media outlets and newspapers of the time reported frequently on the two men and Élie creating a character of Élie making her a well-known name. Newspapers often referred to her as an extremely beautiful and detailed how she used her wit and beauty to manipulate Manda and Leca.

== Aftermath of the feud ==
In May 1902, a trial was held for the violent attacks between Leca and Manda and Élie was made to testify. The trial drew the attention of the public, resulting in many people trying to gain access to the court building after having learned about the case in newspaper articles that were covering the ongoing feud. The trial ended with Manda claiming crimes of passion, and being sentenced to a life of forced labor, while Leca was sent to a penal colony for eight years.

Due to the trial, Élie gained a certain level of fame, which resulted in many reaching out to her, wanting to paint her portrait or have her act in plays. She became well known for revealing many of the Apache gang secrets, as well as for being the woman to cause such violent attacks between two prominent gangs. As a result of her actions, the Apaches' code of secrecy was broken, and details and identities were revealed to both the court and the media. Élie wrote an account from her perspective for Fin de Siecle, a journal of the time, that would later be published by a historian. Le Petit Journal was one of the newspaper outlets to report on the case, and emphasized that gruesome nature of the Apache interactions with police. The newspapers also provided regular information on the involved actors to the public, including their distinctive appearance through particular hairstyles and tattoos.

== Later life ==
Fame brought her many benefits and a fairly substantive income for a short period of time.

After the trial had ended, Élie married André Alexandre Nardin on 27 January 1917. At the time, Nardin was 23 and Élie was nearly 40. Nardin was a shoemaker and earned a small living, but it was enough to support himself, Élie and Nardin's four children.

Élie died of an unstated illness on 6 April 1933, at age 55.

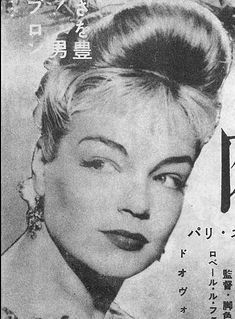
Actress Simone Signoret, who played Marie in Casque d'Or

== Media portrayal ==
The movie Casque d'Or (dir. Jacques Becker), which chronicled Amélie Élie's life, was released in 1952. Although the general premise was true, the film dramatized Élie's experiences to appeal to audiences. The movie generally follows the story line of the real-life battle between Manda and Leca over Élie. It focuses on theatrical fighting scenes and the love story between Marie (the character based on Élie), and Manda while eliminating many of the historical details important to understanding their story.
