= Andreu Martín =

Spanish novelist (born 1949)

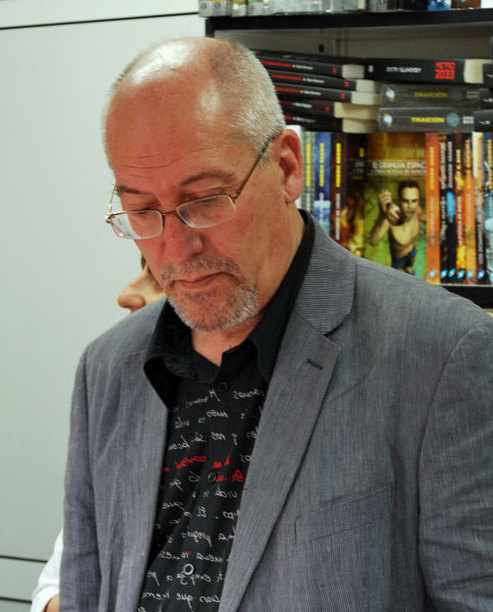
Martín signing books at the Feria del Libro de Madrid (ES)

Andreu Martín (born 1949) is a Spanish author who specializes in crime and detective novels.

Martín was one of the few Spanish novelists who specialized in crime and detective works who made a living off of them. Patricia Hart, author of The Spanish Sleuth: The Detective in Spanish Fiction, said "the resultant freedom to focus on his fiction has meant that he is developing his substantial talent at an impressive rate."

== Style ==
Hart stated that Martín's works explore "a desire to create protagonists who are believable and corruptible the way real people are" and also a "fierce will to represent reality faithfully" in contrast to several detective genre conventions. She adds that his signature trademark is illustrating dispassionate violence and murder and that the author "has a knack" for describing the sort "that is the terror of industrialized societies".

== Works ==
His first book was published in 1979. He published six additional books from that point until 1983. The company Sedmay published Martín's first four books as part of the publisher's "Círculo del Crimen" series, directed by Carlos Pascual and published from 1979 to 1980. Patricia Hart described the series as "an ambitious undertaking that strove to put Spanish sleuths in print." According to Hart, the series failed because of a too rapid expansion and an unevenness in the writing of the novels due to the publisher commissioning novels from writers who had specialized in other types of works; this resulted in a bankruptcy. According to Hart, Martín's works within the series were "some of the best."

"Círculo del Crimen"

- Aprende y calla (1979)
  - The novel, set in Barcelona, stars an Andaluz named Julio Izquierdo who immigrated to Barcelona.
- El Sr. Capone no está en casa – The second published book by Martín
  - The novel, set in Chicago during the 1930s, stars Zack Dallara, a private investigator who had a business that was destroyed by the Wall Street crash of 1929.
- A la vejez navajazos – The third published book by Martín
  - The novel is set in Barcelona and the main character is Javier Lallana, a police officer.
- Prótesis, the fourth novel – adapted into Fanny Straw Hair
  - This novel is set in Barcelona. Miguel Vargas Reinoso, known by the aliases "el Gachí", "el Migue", and "el Dientes", is captured by a police officer named Salvador Gallego Perea, nicknamed "el Gallego." Previously el Gallego had paid Migue to perform sexual favors on him. Because el Gallego feared that el Migue could expose him, he destroys Migue's teeth by pistol whipping him. Migue searches for el Gallego after facing four years of prison, then military duty, and then three years in a legitimate civilian job. El Gallego was removed from his police job largely due to what he did to Migue. He had a nervous breakdown, and then became a security guard in an armored truck. As Migue waits for Gallego, he cleans his dentures or his prótesis. Javier Lallana briefly appears in Prótesis.
