= Gloria Fortún =

Spanish writer and translator

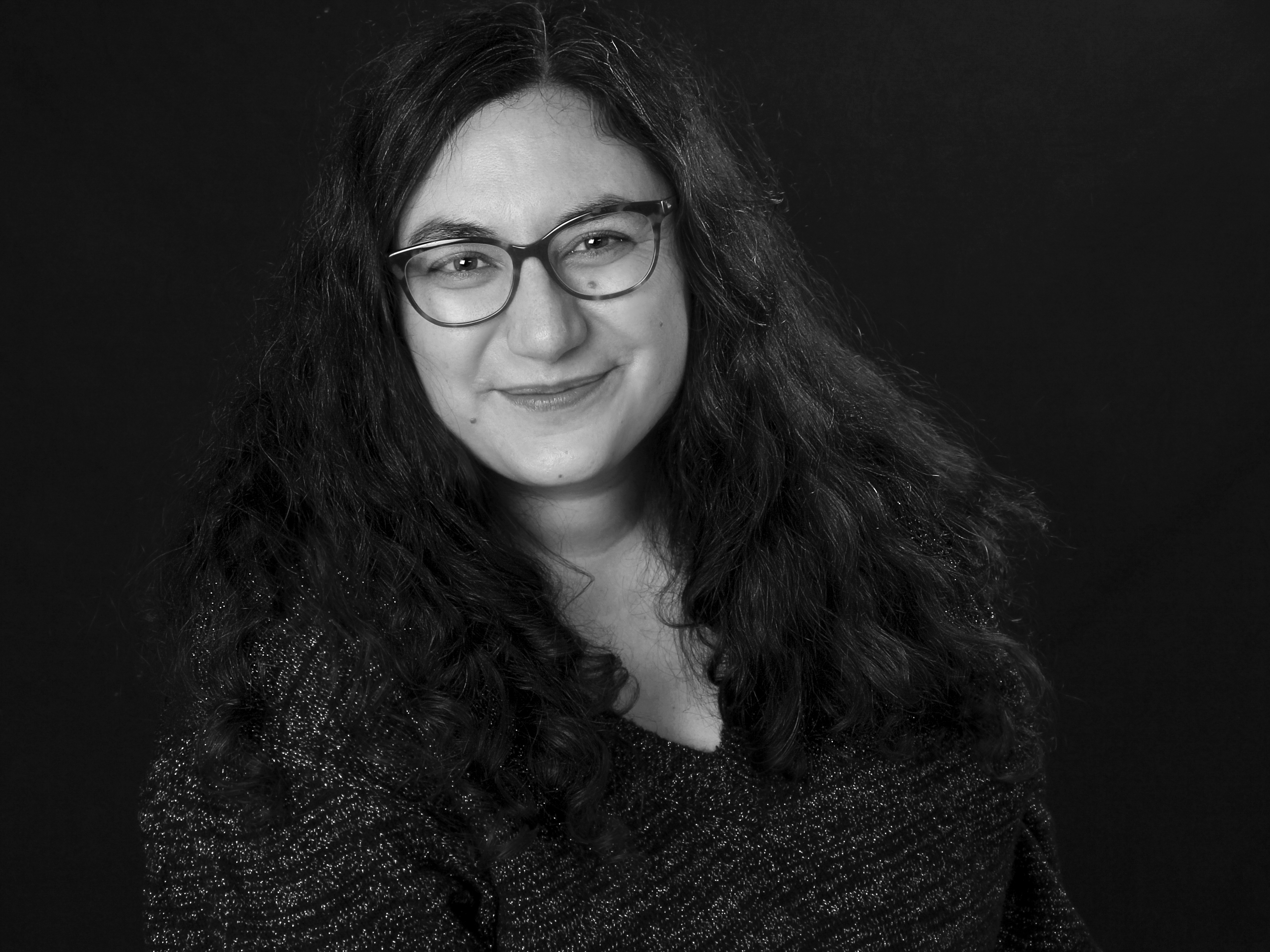
- Fortún in 2021
- Born: April 9, 1977 (age 48); Madrid
- Occupation: Writer
- Website: gloriafortun.net

Gloria Fortún (born in Madrid, April 9, 1977) is a Spanish writer, poet and translator.

Fortún works in the literary world with a multidisciplinary approach that includes writing, poetic performances, literary translation, and teaching creative writing. Her work is impacted by her work in feminist and LGBTQ+ activism.

Fortún has translated authors including Diane Ackerman, Zitkala-Ša and Joanna Russ.

Fortún is the creator and creative writing instructor of the program Escritoras Peligrosas.

In 2021, Fortún published a collection of poems through Dos Bigotes, titled Todas mis palabras son azores salvajes (All my words are wild hawks). In 2022, she published her poetic novel Roja catedral (Red cathedral).

== Publications ==
- Charlotte Brontë. Illustrations Isa Vázquez. Madrid: Sabina, 2011.
- Ábreme con cuidado. Multiple authors. Madrid: Dos Bigotes, 2015.
- Barbarismos queer y otras esdrújulas. Multiple authors. Barcelona: Bellaterra, 2015.
- Esas que también soy yo. Multiple authors. Madrid: Ménades, 2019.
- Todas mis palabras son azores salvajes. Madrid: Dos Bigotes, 2021.
- Roja catedral. Madrid: Dos Bigotes, 2022.

== Sources ==
- NEHUÉN, Tes: «Para mí no hay nada antes que el amor» (For me there is nothing before love), Bestia Lectora, March 2, 2021.
- REDONDO, Laura: «Las mujeres estamos en constante búsqueda de un lenguaje que nos nombre» (We women are constantly searching for a language that names us), Pikara Magazine, April 3.
