= L'Étoile du Nord (film) =

- Film poster
- Directed by: Pierre Granier-Deferre
- Screenplay by: Pierre Granier-Deferre; Jean Aurenche; Michel Grisolia
- Based on: L’Étoile du Nord; 1938 novel by Georges Simenon
- Produced by: Alain Sarde
- Starring: Philippe Noiret; Simone Signoret; Fanny Cottençon
- Cinematography: Pierre-William Glenn
- Edited by: Jean Ravel
- Music by: Philippe Sarde
- Production companies: Sara Films; Films A2
- Distributed by: Parafrance Films
- Release date: 31 March 1982
- Running time: 124 minutes
- Country: France
- Language: French
- Box office: $7.7 million

L'Étoile du Nord (English: The North Star) is a 1982 French film directed by Pierre Granier-Deferre and based on a novel by Georges Simenon, starring Simone Signoret, Philippe Noiret, Fanny Cottençon and Julie Jézéquel. It won a César Award for Best Adaptation and Best Supporting Actress, and was nominated for Best Actress, Most Promising Actress and Best Editing.

== Plot ==
On a ship in the 1930s sailing from Alexandria to Marseille, Édouard Binet, a French adventurer, meets Nemrod Loktum, a shady Egyptian businessman, and Sylvie Baron, a Belgian exotic dancer. Nemrod takes the Étoile du Nord train to Brussels, on which he is robbed and killed. Édouard then takes a room at the boarding house in Charleroi of Madame Baron, Sylvie's mother, with bloodstained clothes and a lot of money that he hides. Despite the suspicions of her younger daughter Antoinette and the other lodgers, the frosty Madame Baron is gradually charmed by the suave Frenchman and believes his stories. The police learn of his presence and, after trial, he is sent to the infamous Île de Ré for transportation to the penal colonies. Madame Baron is among the grieving relatives who wave goodbye.

== Cast ==
- Simone Signoret as Mme Louise Baron
- Philippe Noiret as Edouard Binet
- Fanny Cottençon as Sylvie Baron
- Julie Jézéquel as Antoinette Baron
- Liliana Gerace as Jasmina
- Gamil Ratib as Nemrod Lobetoum
- Jean-Yves Chatelais as Valesco
- Jean Dautremay as L'ingénieur
- Pierre Forget as Albert
- Jean-Pierre Klein as Moïse
