= Henri Alekan =

French cinematographer

- Portrait of Henri Alekan
- Born: 10 February 1909; Montmartre, Paris, France
- Died: 15 June 2001 (aged 92); Auxerre, Bourgogne, France
- Education: Conservatoire national des arts et métiers Institut d'optique Graduate School
- Occupation: cinematographer
- Notable work: cinematography textbook Des lumières et des ombres

Henri Alekan (10 February 1909, Paris – 15 June 2001, Auxerre, Bourgogne) was a French cinematographer.

== Life ==
Alekan was born in Montmartre in 1909. At the age of sixteen, he and his brother became travelling puppeteers. A little later he started work as a third assistant cameraman at the Billancourt Studios. He then spent a short time in the army, returning to Billancourt in 1931.

In the late 1930s he was the camera operator to Eugen Schüfftan on Marcel Carné's Quai des Brumes and Drôle de drame. He was greatly influenced by Schufftan's non-naturalistic style. His first success as a director of photography was René Clément's realistic war drama La Bataille du Rail of 1946. In the same year he worked on Jean Cocteau's fable, La Belle et la Bête.

He found himself out of sympathy with the French New Wave cinema, which emerged in the late 1950s, and Alekan shot some rather conventional films in Hollywood. A new generation of directors appreciated his visionary style, however, and he worked with Raúl Ruiz on The Territory and On Top of the Whale, with Joseph Losey on Figures in a Landscape and The Trout, and with Wim Wenders on The State of Things and Wings of Desire. His last films were made with the Israeli director Amos Gitai.

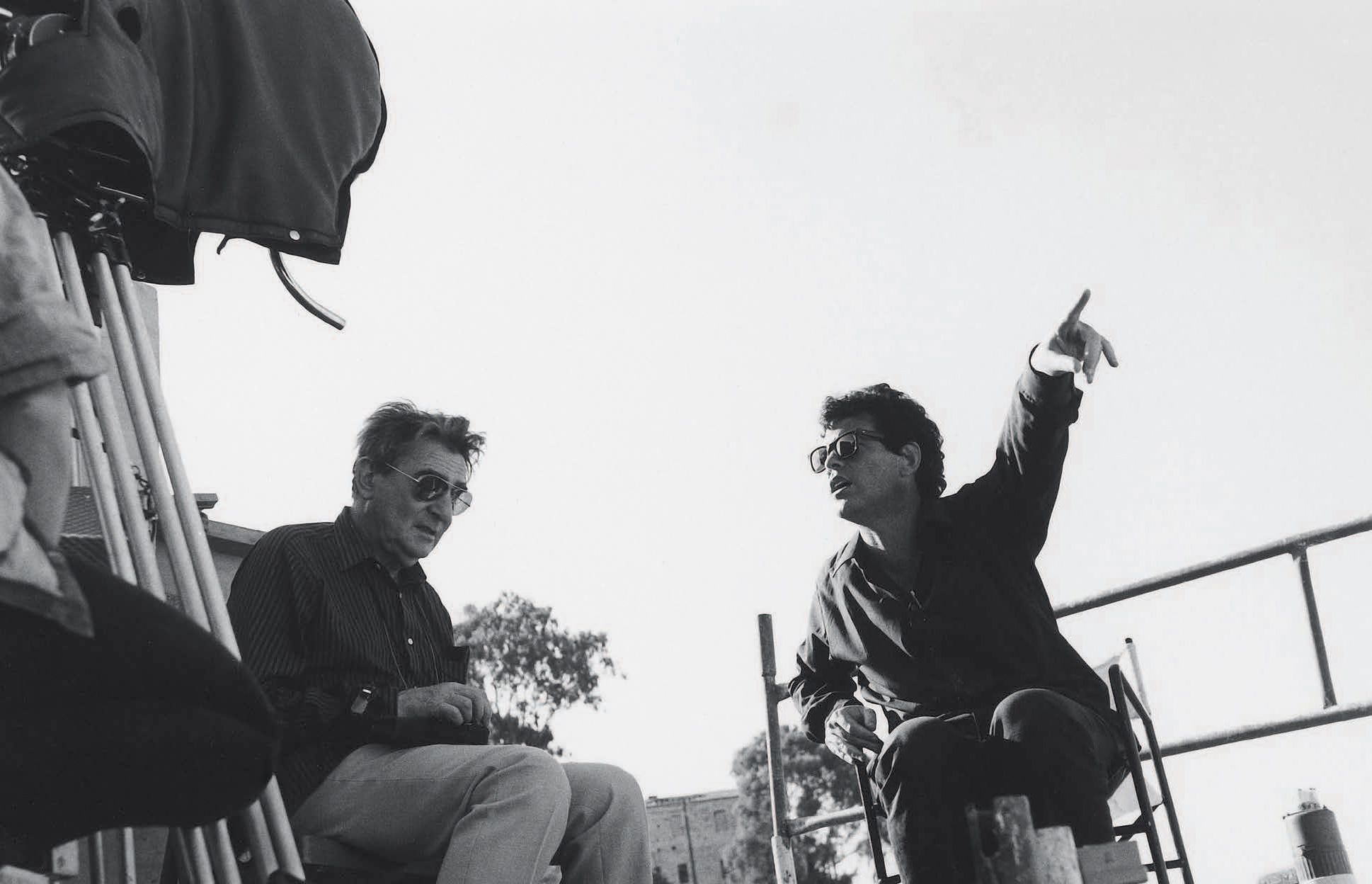
Amos Gitai and Henri Alekan in 1986

He wrote one of the best books about cinematography, Des lumières et des ombres (1984, Éditions du Collectionneur).

Henri Alekan graduates from the Conservatoire national des arts et métiers and the Institut d'optique Graduate School.

== Death ==
Alekan died from leukaemia on 15 June 2001 in Auxerre, Bourgogne, aged 92.

== Filmography ==
- The People of France (1936)
- The Red Dancer (1937)
- Tobias Is an Angel (1940)
- Vénus aveugle (1941)
- Les Petites du quai aux fleurs (1944)
- La Bataille du rail (1946)
- La Belle et la bête (1946) (a.k.a. Beauty and the Beast)
- Les Maudits (1947)
- Anna Karenina (1948)
- Une si jolie petite plage (1949) (a.k.a. Such a Pretty Little Beach or Riptide)
- La Marie du port (1949)
- The Lovers of Verona (1949)
- Juliette ou la clef des songes (1950)
- Just Me (1950)
- Stranger on the Prowl (1951)
- Paris est toujours Paris (1952)
- The Voyage to America (1951)
- Trois femmes, trois âmes (1952)
- Trois femmes (1952) (segment "Boitelle")
- Roman Holiday (1953)
- Julietta (1953)
- Les Amours finissent à l'aube (1953)
- When You Read This Letter (1953)
- Zoé (1954)
- Queen Margot (1954)
- Les Impures (1955)
- House on the Waterfront (1955)
- The Heroes Are Tired (1955)
- The Toy Wife (1955)
- La Meilleure part (1956)
- The Wages of Sin (1956)
- Typhoon Over Nagasaki (1957)
- The Case of Doctor Laurent (1957)
- Casino de Paris (1957)
- Cerf-volant du bout du monde (1958)
- Would-Be Gentleman (1958)
- Twelve Hours By the Clock (1959)
- Forbidden Fruit (1959)
- Marriage of Figaro (1959)
- Le Secret du Chevalier d'Éon (1959)
- Princesse de Clèves (1960)
- Black Tights (1960)
- Austerlitz (1960)
- Tales of Paris (1962)
- Five Miles to Midnight (1963)
- Topkapi (1964)
- Lady L (1965)
- Poppies Are Also Flowers (1966) (a.k.a. Danger Grows Wild, The Opium Connection, The Poppy Is Also a Flower)
- Triple Cross (1966)
- Mayerling (1968)
- The Christmas Tree (1969) (a.k.a. When Wolves Cry)
- Figures in a Landscape (1970)
- The Magic of the Kite (1971)
- Red Sun (1971)
- Jackpot (1974-1975) (unfinished film directed by Terence Young)
- The Territory (1981)
- The Trout (1982)
- The State of Things (1982)
- En rachachant (1982)
- On Top of the Whale (1982)
- The Beautiful Prisoner (1982)
- Une pierre dans la bouche (1983)
- A Strange Love Affair (1984)
- Our Nazi (1984)
- Wundkanal (1985)
- Esther (1986)
- Wings of Desire (1987)
- I Write in Space (1989)
- Berlin-Jerusalem (1989)
- Golem, the Ghost of Exile (1992)

== See also ==
- Studio Harcourt
