= Éric Blanc =

French impressionist

Éric Degbegni, better known as Éric Blanc (born October 13, 1965 in Cotonou, Benin), is a French Impressionist and comedian.

His father was a professional magistrate and his mother was a pediatric nurse. He lived in Cotonou until 1975, when his family move to Paris in exile after Général Kérékou's coup d'état. He discontinued his law courses for the stage. In 1986 he began his career with an engagement at the Caveau de la République, a venue for new humorists in Paris, performing imitations of President Valéry Giscard d'Estaing, the TV host Frédéric Mitterrand, and the French tennis player Yannick Noah. He has played on different TV shows as la Classe on France 3.

He has performed one-man shows in the Bataclan and the Bobino theatres in Paris.

== Filmography ==
- L'œil au beur(re) noir (1987)
- Black mic-mac 2 (1988)
- À gauche en sortant de l'ascenseur (1988)
- L'Invité surprise (1989)
- Thank You Satan (1989)
- L'un contre l'autre (1995)
- Que la lumière soit (1997)
- Retour à la vie (2000)
