= Narrelle Harris =

Australian writer

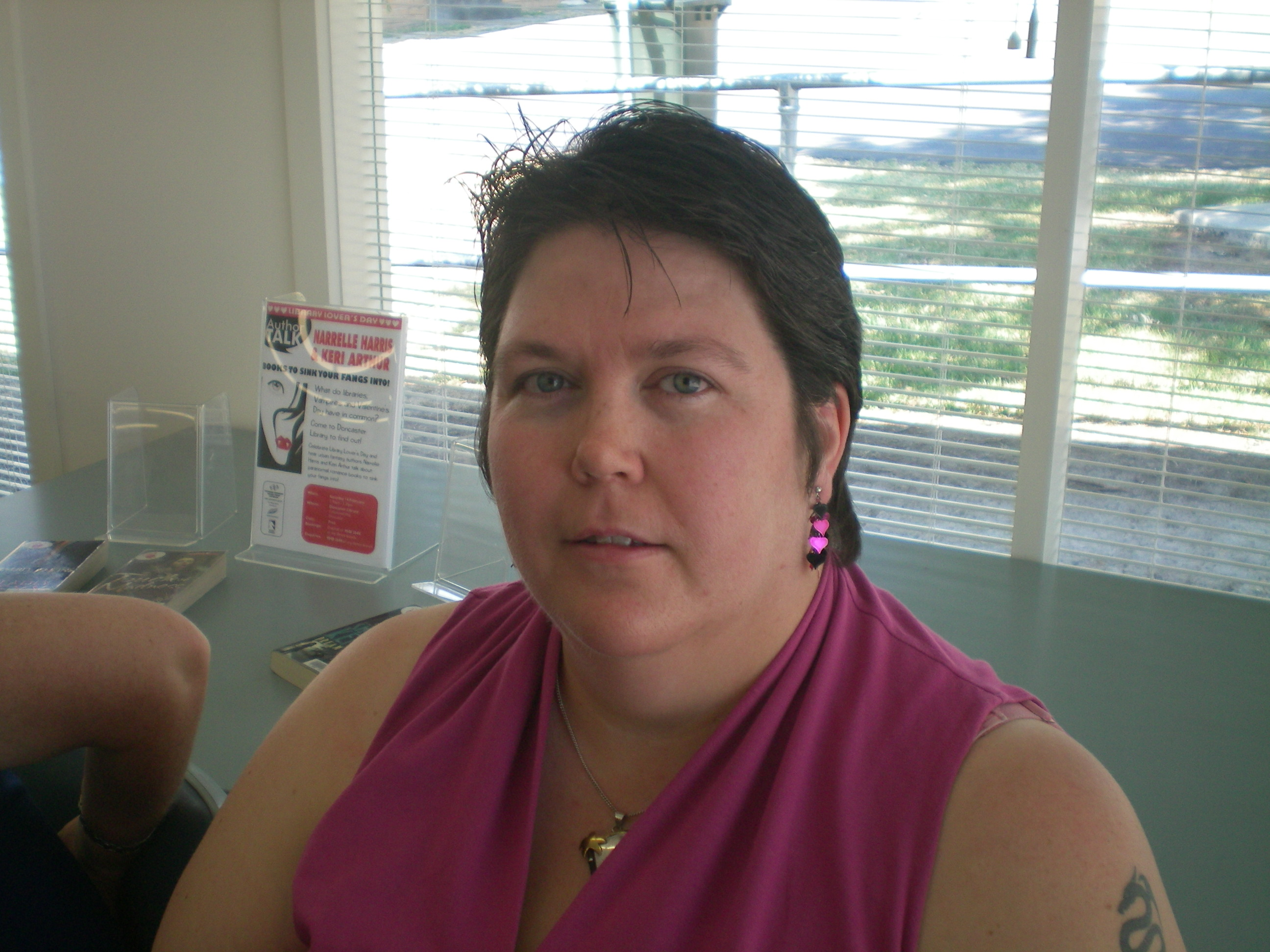
Narrelle Harris

Narrelle M. Harris (also credited as Narrelle Harris) is a Melbourne-based writer. She wrote the award winning short play Stalemate in 2003.

== Biography ==
Harris was born in Newcastle, New South Wales.

Harris's earliest writing, dating back to the early 1990s, was through science fiction fandom, including work based in the Star Trek, Blake's 7 and V universes. Fanzines which she wrote and/or edited include Phoenix (B7), Scenario (The Greatest American Hero), Out of the War Zone (V), and Inconsequential Parallax (genzine), which was nominated for a Ditmar Award in 1992.

The Opposite of Life (2007) is a contemporary vampire novel set in Melbourne, told from the point of view of a young librarian. Harris has discussed online and on radio about how the second book in the series — tentatively titled Walking Shadows — was completed but was considered unsuitable, forcing her to start writing it again from scratch. Witch Faith (2007), was considered by Library Journal to have "strong female characters and a gracefully told story."

Harris has also written film and theatre reviews, the latter as a reviewer and feature writer for the now defunct online theatre magazine, Stage Left. This site is now preserved in the Pandora archives.

In 2006, she appeared alongside Scott Brennan in the short film Outland as "Ginny".

Harris was a guest, in 2009, on episode 167 of the Boxcutters podcast, talking about television vampires. She is currently the resident literary "expert" on the weekly radio show "The Outland Institute" on Joy 94.9.
