= Casque d'Or =

1952 film by Jacques Becker

- French theatrical release poster
- Directed by: Jacques Becker
- Written by: Jacques Becker; Jacques Companéez; Annette Wademant (uncredited)
- Produced by: Robert Hakim; Michel Safra
- Starring: Simone Signoret; Serge Reggiani; Claude Dauphin
- Cinematography: Robert Lefebvre
- Edited by: Marguerite Renoir
- Music by: Georges Van Parys
- Production companies: Speva Films; Paris-Film Production
- Distributed by: DisCina
- Release date: 16 April 1952
- Running time: 98 minutes
- Country: France
- Language: French

Casque d'Or (lit. "Golden Helmet"; released in the U.S. as Golden Marie) is a 1952 French historical-drama film directed by Jacques Becker. It is a Belle Époque tragedy, the story of an ill-fated love affair between characters played by Simone Signoret and Serge Reggiani. The story was loosely based on an infamous real-life love triangle between the prostitute Amélie Élie and the Apache gang leaders Manda and Leca, which was the subject of much sensational newspaper reporting during 1902.

The film was shot at the Billancourt Studios in Paris, as well as at various locations around the city. The sets were designed by art director Jean d'Eaubonne.

== Plot ==
In Belle Époque Paris, Marie, a beautiful woman of the demimonde known for her golden hair, is unhappily involved with Roland, a brutish criminal who is a part of a local syndicate headed by Félix Leca. At a riverside tavern in Joinville, where the gangsters have retreated following a bank robbery, Marie is introduced to the handsome carpenter Georges Manda by his old friend Raymond, a member of Leca's gang, who became friends with Manda years earlier when they served time in prison together. Marie is instantly and noticeably attracted to Manda, and, after they share an intimate dance, Roland attempts to bully Manda, who knocks Roland out with a single punch.

Roland's jealousy builds, but, unbeknownst to him, Marie has learned since they returned to Paris that Manda has a fiancée, and is therefore trying to forget about him. However, Manda shows up at the gang's regular bar, L'Ange Gabriel, to take Marie from Roland, and the men go out back to fight. Leca, who wants Marie for himself and is waiting for an answer from Marie about whether she wants him to "buy" her from Roland, sets the rules for the fight. He throws a knife on the ground between Manda and Roland, and Manda gains control of the knife and fatally stabs Roland. His fighting skills impress Leca, who offers Manda the newly-vacated spot in the gang, but Manda declines. Marie sees Roland's body and leaves alone.

Anatole, a waiter at L'Ange Gabriel, noticed the trouble brewing and alerted the police, who arrive at the scene while the gang members are attempting to get rid of Roland's body. Everyone flees, and Roland's body is discovered. Shortly thereafter, Anatole is found dead, killed, per Leca's orders, for calling the police. However, the death is made to look like an accident, and Leca even urges the members of his gang to contribute money towards Anatole's funeral.

Manda quits his job and is about to flee town when he gets a note from Marie. He goes to meet her in Joinville, where they stay on a small farm and live an idyllic life for a time. Meanwhile, Leca uses his connections with a crooked police inspector to frame Raymond for Roland's death, and then surprises the lovers with a visit to say that Manda is safe because Raymond has been arrested, believing that Manda will come out of hiding to save his friend, and Marie will then be his. Sure enough, Marie awakens in the morning to discover that Manda has gone to turn himself in, and she goes to Leca to plead with him to help Manda escape from police custody. Leca says it is up to her whether he helps Manda or not, and she succumbs to his advances.

Manda signs a confession, but Raymond is not released. While the frustrated inspector is telling him that he is being charged as an accessory to Roland's murder, Raymond glimpses Leca's name in a note, revealing his boss' duplicity. He is able to share this information with Manda while they are being transported to La Santé Prison.

Leca refuses to attack the transport to free Manda and Raymond, so Marie hires a coach and manages the escape by herself, though Raymond is shot in the process. Manda drops him off at L'Ange Gabriel to die among his friends and then hunts down Leca, finding Marie's slippers in Leca's bedroom. He finally spots Leca in the street and chases him to the police station, where, in front of the stunned officers, he grabs a pistol from a holster, chases Leca into a small courtyard, and empties the gun into him. Now without a job, friend, or love, Manda drops the gun and surrenders to the police.

Paul, a member of Leca's gang, takes Marie to a hotel room overlooking the site where Manda's execution is to take place. He falls asleep, but, at dawn, Marie watches in shock as Manda is led to the guillotine and beheaded. She drops her head, and we see her and Manda dancing in the tavern in Joinville, alone on the dance floor.

== Cast ==
- Simone Signoret as Marie, the titular "Casque d'Or" (though she is never referred to by that nickname in the film)
- Serge Reggiani as Georges "Jo" Manda, a formerly-incarcerated carpenter
- Claude Dauphin as Félix Leca, the leader of the gang, who operates a business selling wine and spirits as a front for his criminal enterprises
- Raymond Bussières as Raymond "the Baker", a member of Leca's gang and Manda's friend from prison
- Odette Barencey as Ma Eugène, who owns the farm where Monda and Marie stay in Joinville
- Loleh Bellon as Léonie Danard, Danard's daughter and Manda's fiancée
- Jacqueline Dane as the upper-class customer at the bar L'Ange Gabriel who dances with Roland
- Dominique Davray as Julie, Marie's friend
- Paul Azaïs as Ponsard "the Headache", a member of Leca's gang
- Paul Barge as Police Inspector Giuliani, who is friendly with Leca
- Claude Castaing as "Boots" Fredo, a member of Leca's gang who pockets some money after a heist
- Jean Clarieux as Paul, a member of Leca's gang who has a drinking problem
- Tony Corteggiani as the police commissioner
- Émile Genevois as "Little" Billy, a member of Leca's gang
- Marc Goutas as Guillaume "the Ferret", a member of Leca's gang
- Gaston Modot as Danard, Manda's boss
- William Sabatier as "Pretty Boy" Roland Dupuis, a member of Leca's gang and Marie's pimp/boyfriend
- Fernand Trignol as Mr. Gabriel, the owner of L'Ange Gabriel
- Yvonne Yma as Mrs. Gabriel, the owner of L'Ange Gabriel
- Roland Lesaffre as Anatole, the server at L'Ange Gabriel who gets murdered after calling the police
- Marcel Melrac as Marie's first coach driver
- Raphaël Patorni as an upper-class customer at L'Ange Gabriel
- Léon Pauléon as Marie's second coach driver
- Daniel Mendaille as the owner of the riverside tavern in Joinville (uncredited)

== Final scene ==
The film's final sequence is famous. In it, after Manda's surrender to the police, Marie arrives at night, with one of Leca's ex-henchmen, at a cheap inn in the city, where they rent a room. There are no immediate clues for the audience as to why this is happening, and only later is it revealed that the room in which she is staying overlooks the courtyard where her lover, Manda, is to be executed. As British film critic Roy Armes wrote, "Becker shows all the hurried ugliness and squalor that surrounds the guillotine, so that we feel this execution to be an affront to humanity."

French New Wave director François Truffaut, who was a fervent admirer of Becker, particularly praised this scene. He wrote: "If you're at all interested in how stories are constructed, you cannot fail to admire the ingenuity of the plot, particularly the strong, oblique, unexpected way it gets abruptly to Manda's execution in a scene that is as beautiful as it is mysterious, as the Casque d'Or [Marie] arrives in the middle of the night at a disreputable hotel. When I or any of my fellow scenarists are in trouble, we often say to each other, 'How about a Casque d'Or solution?'"

== Reception ==
According to Lexikon des Internationalen Films (Encyclopedia of International Film): "With Casque d'Or, Jacques Becker has made the most stylistically clear and filmically convincing film about belle époque. The drawing of the shady milieu, the deeply human interpretation of the love relationship between Manda and Marie – that is fascinatingly dramatised and convinced not least by the excellent actors Simone Signoret and Serge Reggiani. Becker proves to be a master of character representation in mastering a poetic realism that only a few directors of this time succeeded in doing."

Das Große Personenlexikon des Films (The Great Biographical Dictionary of Film Persons) claims: "His milieu portrait from the turn of the century, the clearly structured story about a gangster rivalry, is considered Becker's masterpiece".

Reclams Filmführer (Reclam's Film Guide) says: "Becker was not interested in making a 'historical gangster film'; he created a very unusual film about the 'belle époque', in which people are more important than events, feelings more real than criminal involvement. A film of unusual beauty, strict will to style, clear dramaturgy – probably Becker's masterpiece."

The entry about the film in Buchers Enzyklopädie des Films (Bucher's Encyclopedia of Film) reads: "Becker gives a masterly account of Paris at the turn of the century, both in the set-up and in the drawing of the characters. Despite the bleak plot, the film has a life-affirming trait, especially in the exterior shots, which is primarily due to the strong charisma of Simone Signoret in the leading role."

On the review aggregator website Rotten Tomatoes, 100% of 15 critics' reviews of the film are positive, with an average rating of 8.6/10.

== Cultural references ==
In 1986, the French Government issued a series of postage stamps dedicated to the centenary of the French cinema, one of which was a picture of Signoret in Casque d'Or.

In Don Winslow's 2011 novel Satori, the main female character, Solange Picard, watches Casque d'Or repeatedly in a cinema in Saigon, crying at the end each time.
