= Lourdes Ortiz =

Spanish writer

- Born: 1943 (age 82–83); Madrid, Spain
- Spouse: Jesus Munarriz
- Writing career
- Genres: plays, poetry, essays, fiction

Lourdes Ortiz (born 1943, Madrid, Spain) is a Spanish writer of novels, plays, poems and essays. She has worked for several different newspapers and magazines, including El País, El Mundo, and Diario 16, mainly focusing on social and political topics.

== Early life and education ==
Oritz was educated in a convent school where she studied philosophy and literature until the age of sixteen. She went on to study geography and history in the Complutense University of Madrid.

== Career ==
Ortiz taught art history at the Royal School of Dramatic Art of Madrid, where she was the director from 1991 to 1993. She has collaborated with different newspapers and magazines including El País, El Mundo, and Diario 16, writing opinion-based columns on social and political issues. In 1999, she began working on a television show called "Así es la Vida", which translates to "This is How Life Is", that accompanied the morning news on the network Telecinco. Despite her involvement in the news industry, Ortiz has stated that she has a greater passion for writing novels rather than newspaper articles. She believes that novels exhibit dimensions of her own time and finds them more challenging to write.

=== Notable works ===
Ortiz is known for her variety of work in drama, poetry, essays, and fiction. One of her most popular novels is Luz de memoria (1976). It tells the story of a man who after suffering an emotional crisis, was admitted to a psychiatric hospital. She subsequently published Picadura mortal (1979) which entails how a detective named Bárbara Arenas investigates the disappearance of a businessman in the Canary Islands. Her next novel, En días como éstos (1981), addresses issues of terrorism and violence. Ortiz then published Magpie (1982), a historical novel about Urraca of León. The story focuses on the dialogue between the queen and the imprisoned monk who brings her food. In this novel, the author utilizes archaic language in order to recreate the medieval atmosphere as well as to describe the strong and ambitious nature of the protagonist. Another one of her well-known pieces is Archángeles (1986), which is a reflection on the passage of time, and ironic and retrospective to those who were protagonists in Spain during the 1960s.

== Personal life ==
At nineteen years old, she married a poet named Jesus Munarriz, with whom she had a son, and divorced in 1968. She then became partners with philosopher Fernando Savater, and later went on to having relations with actor and writer Daniel Sarasola in the eighties.

== Other works ==
Her other novels include Camas (1989), Antes de la batalla (1992), La fuente de la vida (1995), Fatima de los naufragios (1998), La liberated (1998), and Una mirada insólita sobre Pablo y Nerón (1999). In the field of drama, Lourdes Ortiz has published Las murals de Jericó (1980), Penteo (1983), and Fedra (1984). Her novel La fuente de la vida made her the finalist of the Planet Prize. Ortiz has also worked with several publications, has translated books from French and has maintained an active involvement in politics.

- Asco
- Electra
- Los viajeros del futuro
- Escritos políticos de Larra, 1967.
- Andrés García, de 19 años de edad, 1969.
- Comunicación y crítica. Madrid: Pablo del Río, 1977.
- Conocer a Rimbaud y su obra. Barcelona: Dopesa, 1979.
- La caja de lo que pudo ser. Madrid: Altea, S.A. de Ediciones-Grupo Santillana, 1981. Cuentos.
- Paisajes y figuras
- Doce relatos de mujeres
- Navajo, Ymelda (ed.) Madrid: Alianza, 1982.
- El Cairo. Barcelona: Grijalbo, 1985.
- Yudita, 1988.
- Alicia
- Los motivos de Circe. Madrid: Ediciones del Dragón, 1988.
- Cenicienta y otros relatos. Madrid: Compañía Europea de Comunicaciones e Información, 1991.
- Los motivos de Circe; Yudita. Madrid: Castalia, 1991.
- El inmortal
- El cascabel al gato. Ciudad Real: Ñaque Editora, 1996.
- El puente. Cuento. En: Érase una vez la paz. Barcelona: Planeta, 1996, pp. 165–166.
- El sueño de la pasión:Los cambios en la concepción y la expresión amorosa a través de los grandes textos literarios de la tradición occidental, 1997.
- Fátima de los naufragios: Relatos de tierra y mar, 1998.
- Dánae, 2000.
- CruciGama, 2000.
- Cara de niño, 2002.
- Impacto y pavor, 2003.
- Don Juan, el deseo y las mujeres, 2007.
