= Sue Glover (playwright) =

Scottish playwright (born 1943)

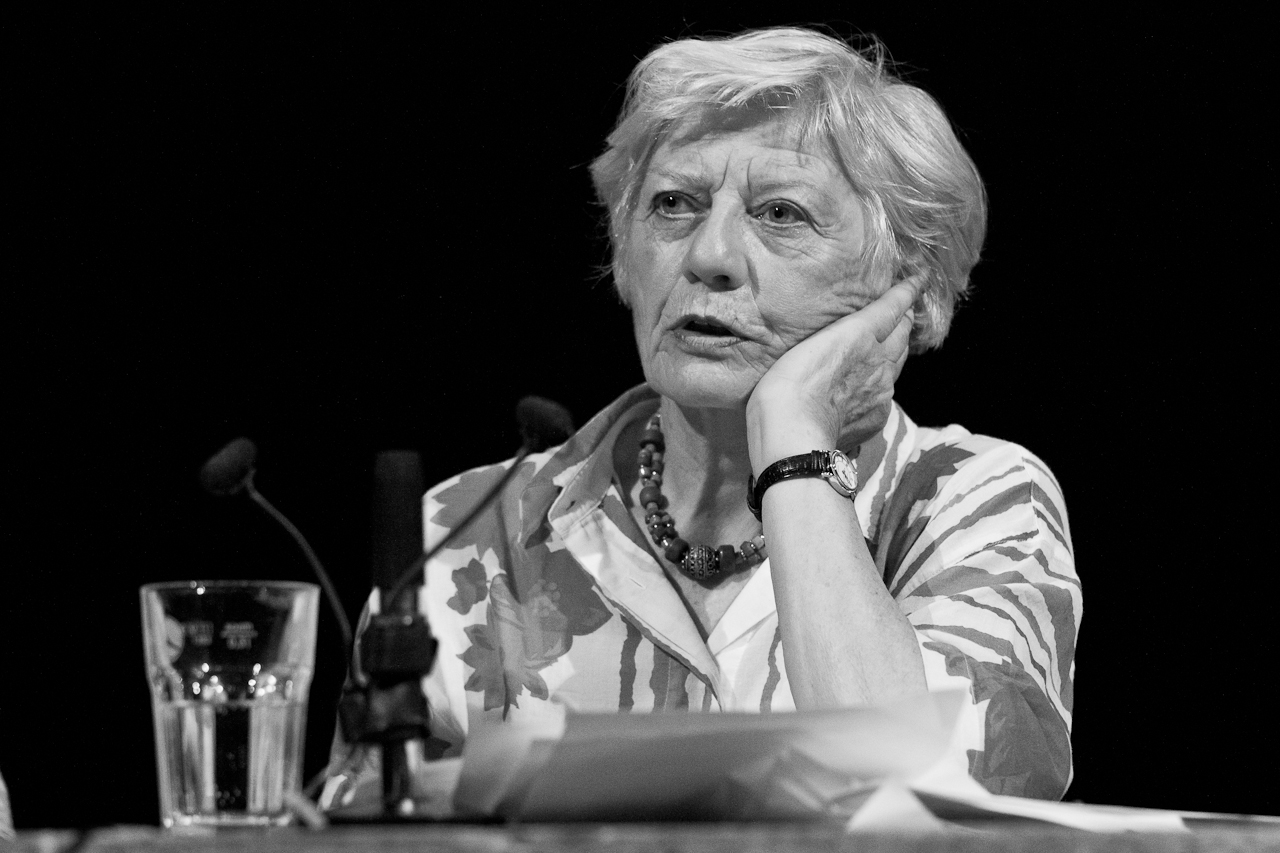
- Glover in 2014
- Born: 1943 (age 82–83); Edinburgh
- Education: Edinburgh University
- Occupation: playwright

Sue Glover (born 1943, Edinburgh) is a Scottish playwright who has authored fictional works and adaptations for theater, radio and television. In the 1970s she worked with Zorina Ishmail Bibby in St. Andrews.

== Life and work ==
Glover was born and raised in Edinburgh, Scotland and graduated from Edinburgh University. While she lived the majority of her life in East Fife, she now lives close to the beach in East Neuk.

Glover's first play was The Seal Wife, which is set on a Scottish beach.

Bondagers explored the social and working conditions of women laboring in the fields of the Scottish Borders. It was produced four times by the Traverse Theatre in Edinburgh with one of those companies going on to perform in Canada. According to Ian Brown, Bondagers marks the "beginning, in modern Scottish theatre, of the removal of dramatic action from the enclosed areas of tenements, workplaces, kitchens of kitchen-sink drama into the open spaces of the beach, sea, fields and woods."

Selected works have been translated for Czech, Finnish and Irish productions. For example, The Seal Wife, The Straw Chair and Bondagers were translated into Czech by David Drozd.

In 2014, Glover participated in the Czech literary festival Month of Author's Reading, which is organized by the Brno publishing house Větrné mlýny, the same agency that shot the Czech television series "Scottish Reading - Don't Worry - Be Scottish," that was directed in part by Glover.

She has adapted works for radio by other authors including some by Rudyard Kipling, Guy de Maupassant, Tove Jansson and Jessie Kesson. She has created original plays for radio including: The Watchie, Shiftwork, The Benjamin, The Child & The Journey, The Doll's Tea Set, and Losing Lottie.

The English premiere of The Straw Chair is scheduled for London's Finborough Theatre in early 2022."

Glover is a fellow of the Association for Scottish Literary Studies.

== Selected productions ==
- Bondagers (Traverse Theatre)
- The Seal Wife (The Little Lyceum))
- The Bubble Boy (Traverse Theatre), (The Tron)
- The Straw Chair (Traverse Theatre)
- An Island in Largo (The Byre)
- Bear On a Chain (Òran Mór)
- Marilyn (Citizens & Lyceum)
- Shetland Saga (Traverse Theatre)
- Artist Unknown (Citizens Theatre)
- BlowOuts, Wrecks & Almanacs (Pittenweem Festival)
- Fairplay (BBC Radio 4)
- Hunger (BBC Radio Scotland)
- Shiftwork
- The Benjamin
- The Wish House
- Sacred Hearts

== Selected publications ==
- Glover, S. (1997). Bondagers & The Straw Chair. Methuen Drama.
- Glover, S. (2000). Shetland Saga. MIT Press.
- Glover, S., & Couleau, G. P. (2003). La chaise de paille. L'Avant-scène théâtre.
- Glover, S. (2014). The Straw Chair. Bloomsbury.
- Glover, S. (2014). Bondagers. Bloomsbury.

== Selected awards ==
- The Bubble Boy won prizes at television festivals in New York and Chicago in 1980.
- Bondagers won a Thames Television Award in 1991.
