= Isabel Franc =

Spanish writer

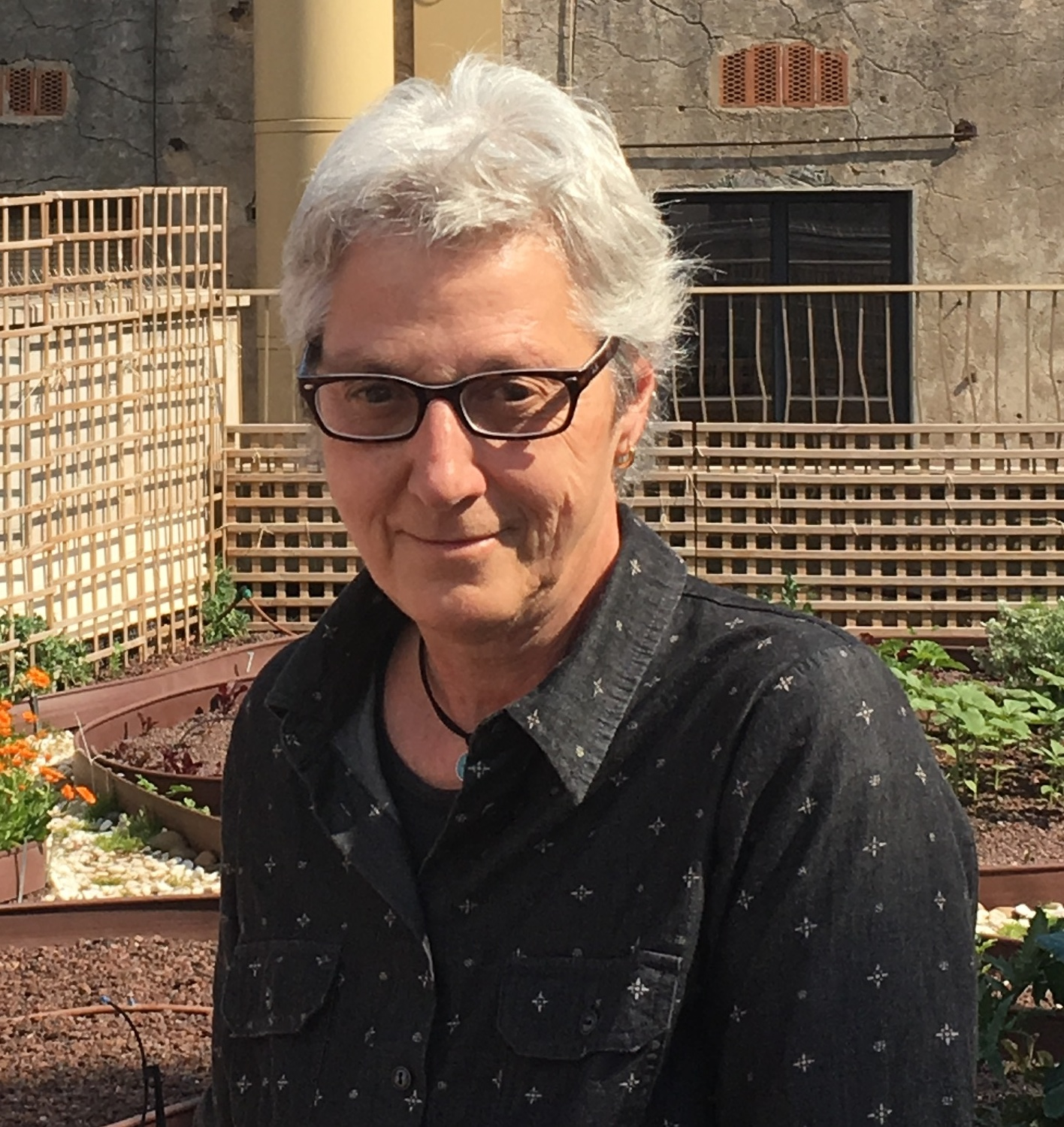
- Born: 1955 (age 70–71); Barcelona, Spain
- Other name: Lola Van Guardia
- Occupation: Writer
- Employer: Ateneu Barcelonès
- Awards: Arena Foundation Terenci Moix Award for Gay and Lesbian Narrative (2011)

Isabel Franc (born 1955) is a Spanish writer who signs some of her novels with the pseudonym Lola Van Guardia.

== Career ==
Isabel Franc's works are characterized by humor and being generally focused on the world of female homosexuality. She has also given lectures and writing courses and she has been invited to talk by American universities. Her style combines satire, irony, and parody in a universe where women are the protagonists.

Since 2010 she has been a professor at the Ateneu Barcelonès where she teaches courses in writing and humorous literature. She has written as a columnist. She is currently (2018) a regular contributor to La Independent, Agencia de Noticias con Visión de Género (The Independent, News Agency with a Gender Perspective).

== Works ==
=== Novels ===
Franc made her literary debut with Entre todas las mujeres (Tusquets, 1992), a La Sonrisa Vertical Prize finalist.

She is the author of the celebrated Lola Van Guardia Trilogy, published by Egales, which includes the titles Con Pedigree (1997), Plumas de Doble Filo (1999), and La mansión de las Tríbadas (2002), and has been translated into several languages.

In November 2004 she published No me llames cariño (Egales), that received the Shangay Prize for the best novel of the year.

In 2006 Las razones de Jo (Lumen) was described as "an unusual, funny, and irreverent version of Little Women."

In 2012 Elogio del Happy End (Egales) was the winner of the 6th Terenci Moix Award for Gay and Lesbian Narrative.

=== Short stories ===
Cuentos y fábulas de Lola Van Guardia (Egales, 2008) is a collection of short stories.

=== Collective works ===
Franc's collective works include Otras Voces (Egales, 2002), Las chicas con las chicas (Egales, 2008), Noves dames del crim (Llibres del Delicte, 2015), Ábreme con cuidado (Dos Bigotes, 2015), Incidente en el salón (a parody of Natalie Barney's famous salon in the Parisian Rive Gauche in the 1920s), and Donde no puedas amar no te demores (Egales 2016).

=== Graphic novels ===
In 2010 she published, along with the cartoonist Susanna Martín, Alicia en un mundo real (Norma cómic), a graphic novel about breast cancer, not without its irony, which received the 2011 Jennifer Quiles Award.

In 2014, again in collaboration with Susanna Martín and Norma cómic, Franc published Sansamba, another graphic novel with autobiographical touches, a reflection on cultural and emotional boundaries based on a supposedly impossible friendship.

=== Essays ===
Franc's essays include "Del pozo a la hiena: humor e ironía en la llamada literatura lésbica" in the collective volume Cultura, homosexualidad y homofobia. Vol II Amazonia: retos de visibilidad lesbiana (Laertes 2007) and "Envers un Elogi del happy end", in Accions i reinvencions. Cultures lésbiques a la Catalunya del tombant de segle XXI (UOC, 2012).

In 2013 the collective book Desconocidas & Fascinantes (Egales) compiled minibiographies to bring visibility to silenced women.

In 2017, Franc coordinated and edited Las Humoristas. Ensayo poco serio sobre mujeres y humor, published by Icaria. In a humorous tone, the book makes a profound reflection upon the presence and absence of women in the field of humor.

=== Translation and editing ===
She translated El jardín de Shahrzad (Egales, 2008) and edited and prefaced the new version of Ladies Almanack by Djuna Barnes (Egales, 2008).

=== Theater ===
Franc participated in the theatrical production Yo soy Gloria Fuertes by Gloria Bosch, directed by Ariadna Martí de Puig. She is the author of the play De Generacions, a text for three characters that shows how two generations separated by time understand, live, and express feminism.

== Awards ==
- 1992: La Sonrisa Vertical Prize finalist
- 2004: Shangay Award
- 2011: Jennifer Quiles Award
- 2011: Arena Foundation Terenci Moix Award for Gay and Lesbian Narrative
