= LGBTQ literature in Spain =

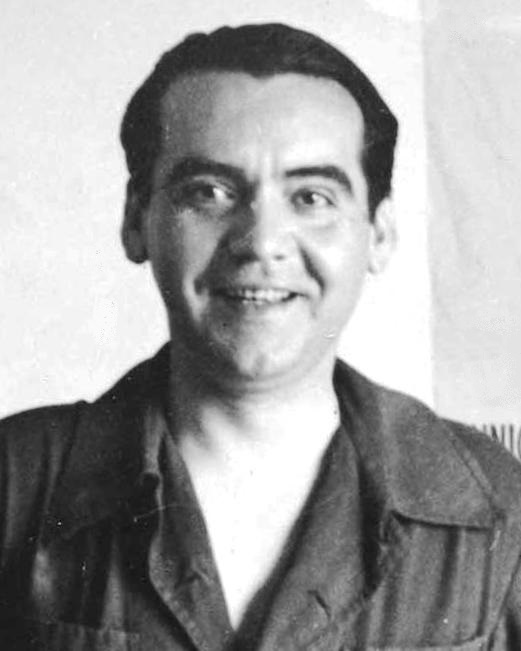
Federico García Lorca in 1932

LGBT literature in Spain, that is, literature that deals explicitly and primarily with characters and issues within the LGBT+ spectrum, is linked to the progressive social acceptance of sexual diversity in Spain. A great surge of authors, publications, awards, bookstores, and publishing houses—such as Egales, the "first openly homosexual publishing house in Spain"—burst into the scene in the 1990s. In 1995, the Círculo de Bellas Artes itself in Madrid organized a series of 22 literary gatherings on this subject, which evidenced the flourishing of this type of literature.

== Hispano-Arabic erotic poetry ==
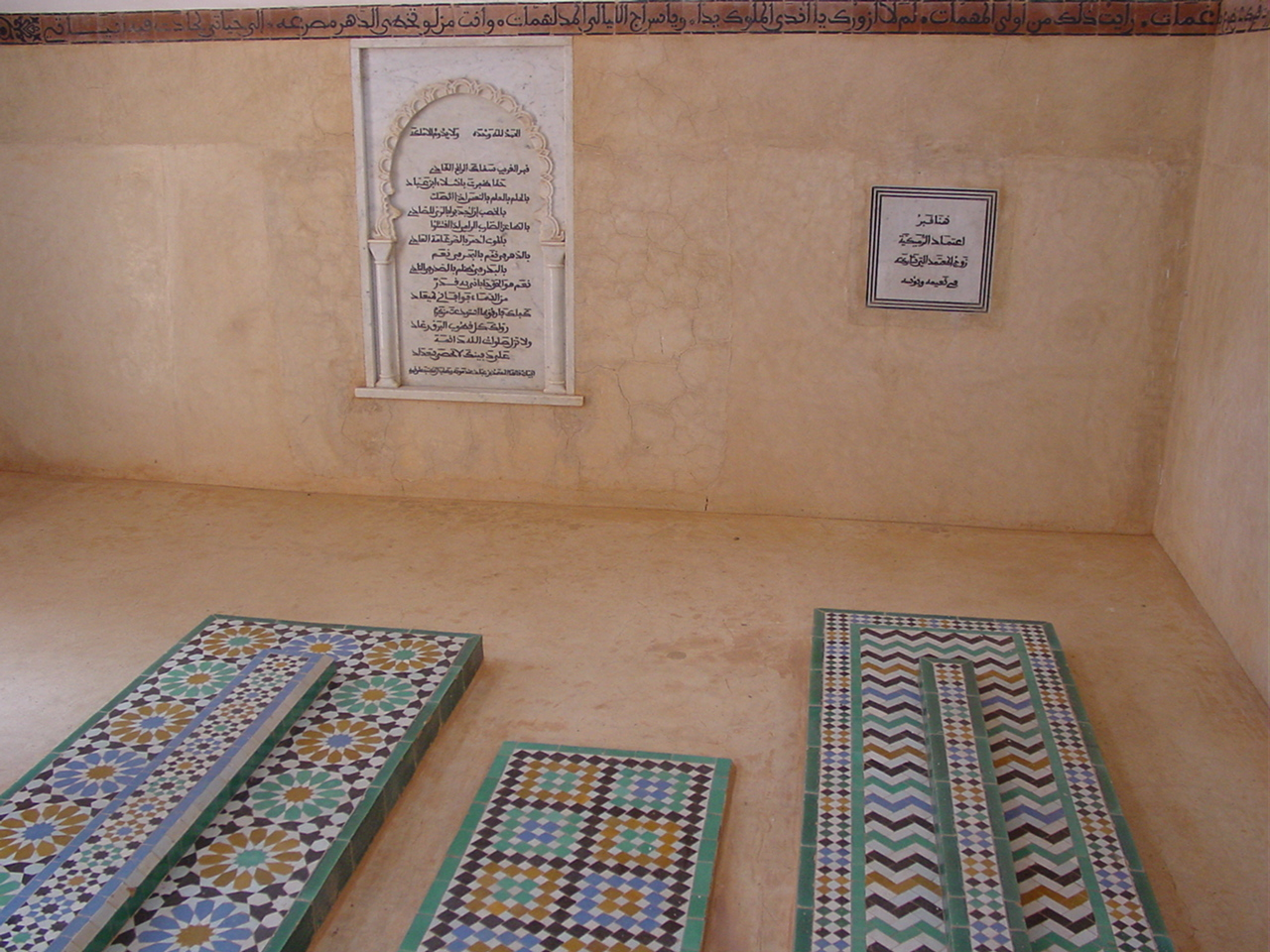
Tomb of al-Mu'tamid (on the left) in Aghmat (Morocco)

In Al-Andalus, a type of poetry flourished that was highly refined and in which homoeroticism was a recurring theme. The Moorish kings themselves wrote this type of pederastic poetry, such as the Abbadid Al-Mu'tamid ibn Abbad of Seville and Yusuf III of the Nasrid Kingdom of Granada. It began to flourish in the first half of the 9th century, during the reign of Abd ar-Rahman II, emir of Córdoba. The fall of the Caliphate of Córdoba in the 11th century and the subsequent rule of the Almoravid dynasty and division into the taifa kingdoms decentralized culture all throughout the Al-Andalus region, producing an era of splendor in poetry. The Almohad invasion brought the emergence of new literary courts in the 12th and 13th centuries. Greater female autonomy in this North African ethnic group led to the appearance of a higher number of female poets, some of whom also wrote poems that sang of feminine beauty.

The homoeroticism present in Moorish poetry establishes a type of relationship like the one described in ancient Greece: the adult poet assumes an active role as opposed to an ephebe who assumes the passive role. This came to produce a literary cliché, that of the appearance of the bozo, (Note: English: Upper-lip fuzz) which allows, given the descriptive ambiguity of the poems, both in images and grammatical uses, for identifying the gender of the lover being described. Much of the erotic-amorous poetry of the period is devoted to the cupbearer or wine server, combining the bacchic (خمريات jamriyyat) and homoerotic (مذكرات mudhakkarat) genres.

== 19th century ==
In realist literature, starting in the last third of the 19th century and for much of the 20th, homosexuality was seen in a negative light. This was influenced by the theses of Italian positivism (Cesare Lombroso considered that homosexuality led to crime), French degeneration (in authors such as Bénédict Morel, Valentin Magnan— who rejected homosexuality because its spread was contrary to procreation and therefore to the survival of the human species—and Max Nordau, who was inspired by these ideas for his 1892 essay Degeneration-Entartung, 1892–1893), and the German clinical school, with theses such as those of Dr. Karl Friedrich Otto Westphal, who maintained that homosexuality was a disease. In literature, homosexual characters appear infiltrated in all social classes and are presented, in general, as elements that threaten the good health of society—although there are exceptions, such as the chaplain who is the protagonist of Los pazos de Ulloa (1886) (translated into English with the title The House of Ulloa) by Emilia Pardo Bazán. There are examples of effeminate and perverse clergymen in works such as La regenta by Leopoldo Alas "Clarín". Also, the prototype of the degenerate bourgeois, whose pathology leads him to crime, can be found in the character of Maximiliano in Fortunata y Jacinta (1887) by Benito Pérez Galdós.

== 20th century up until 1975 ==
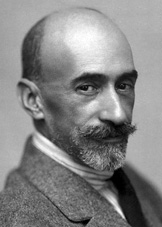
Jacinto Benavente

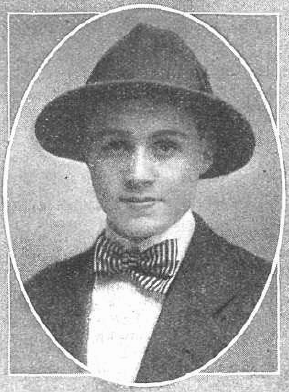
Álvaro Retana in a photograph published in Mundo Gráfico in 1913.

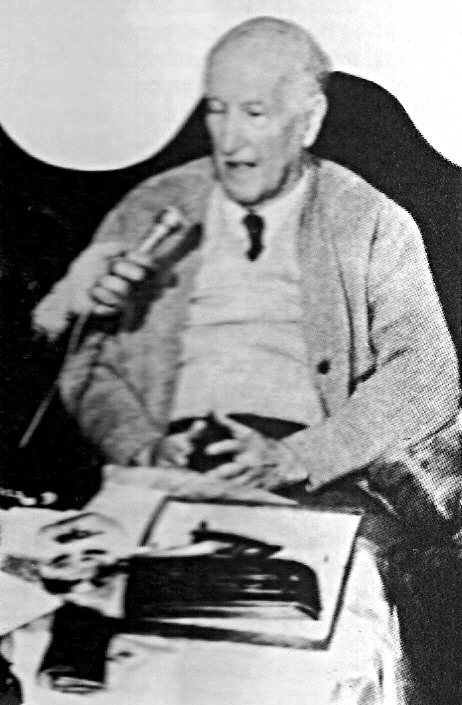
Vicente Aleixandre in 1977.

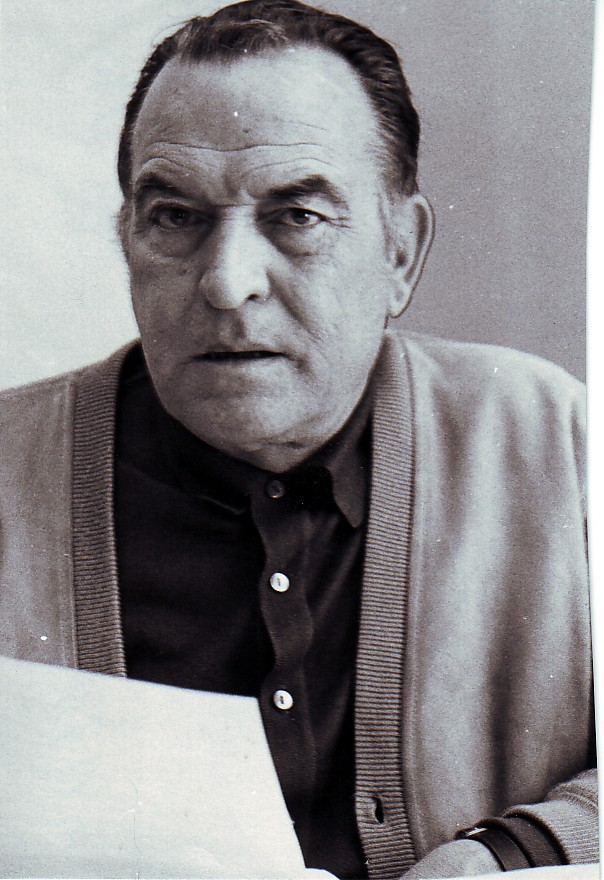
Juan Bernier Luque

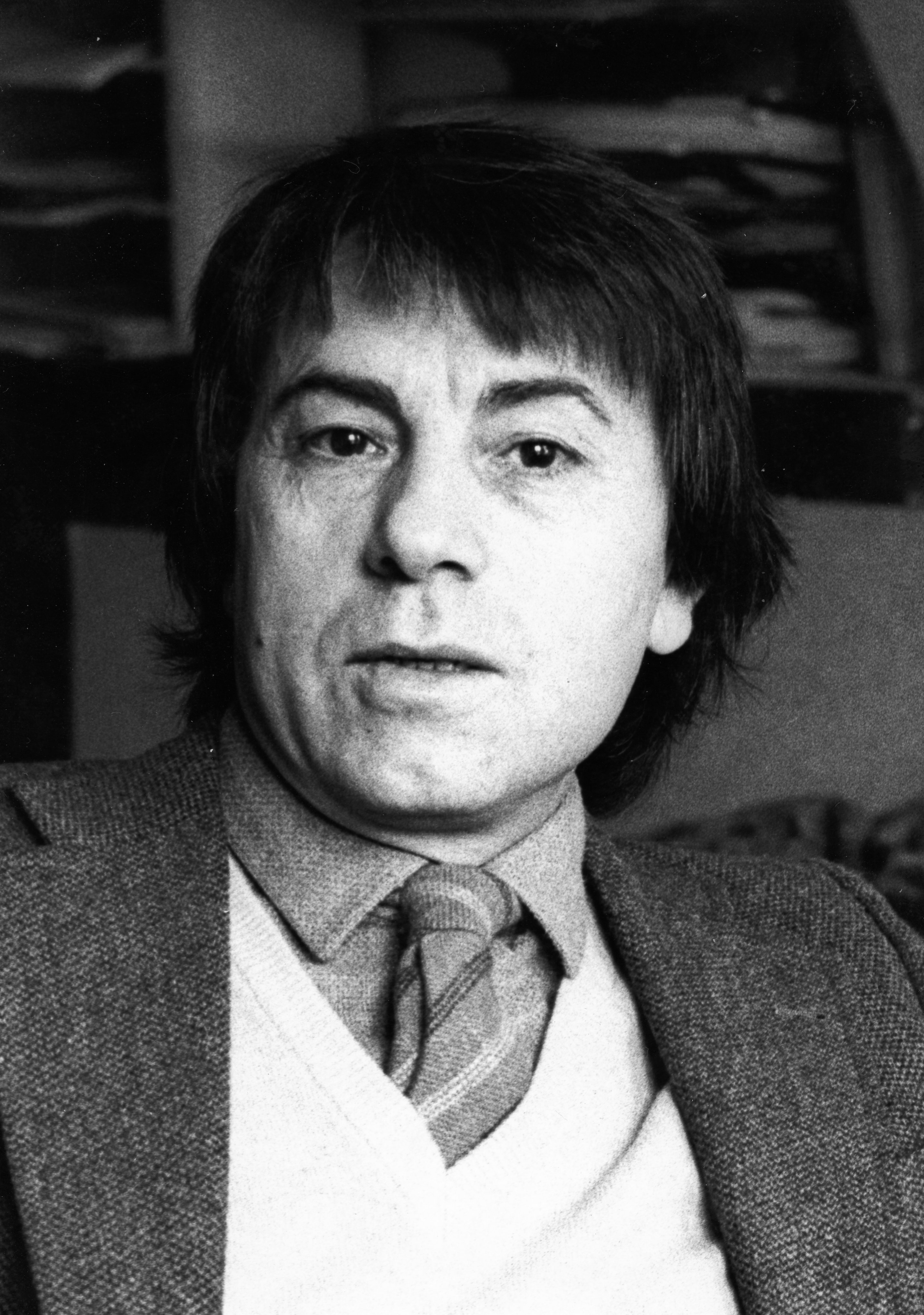
Agustín Gómez-Arcos in Paris.

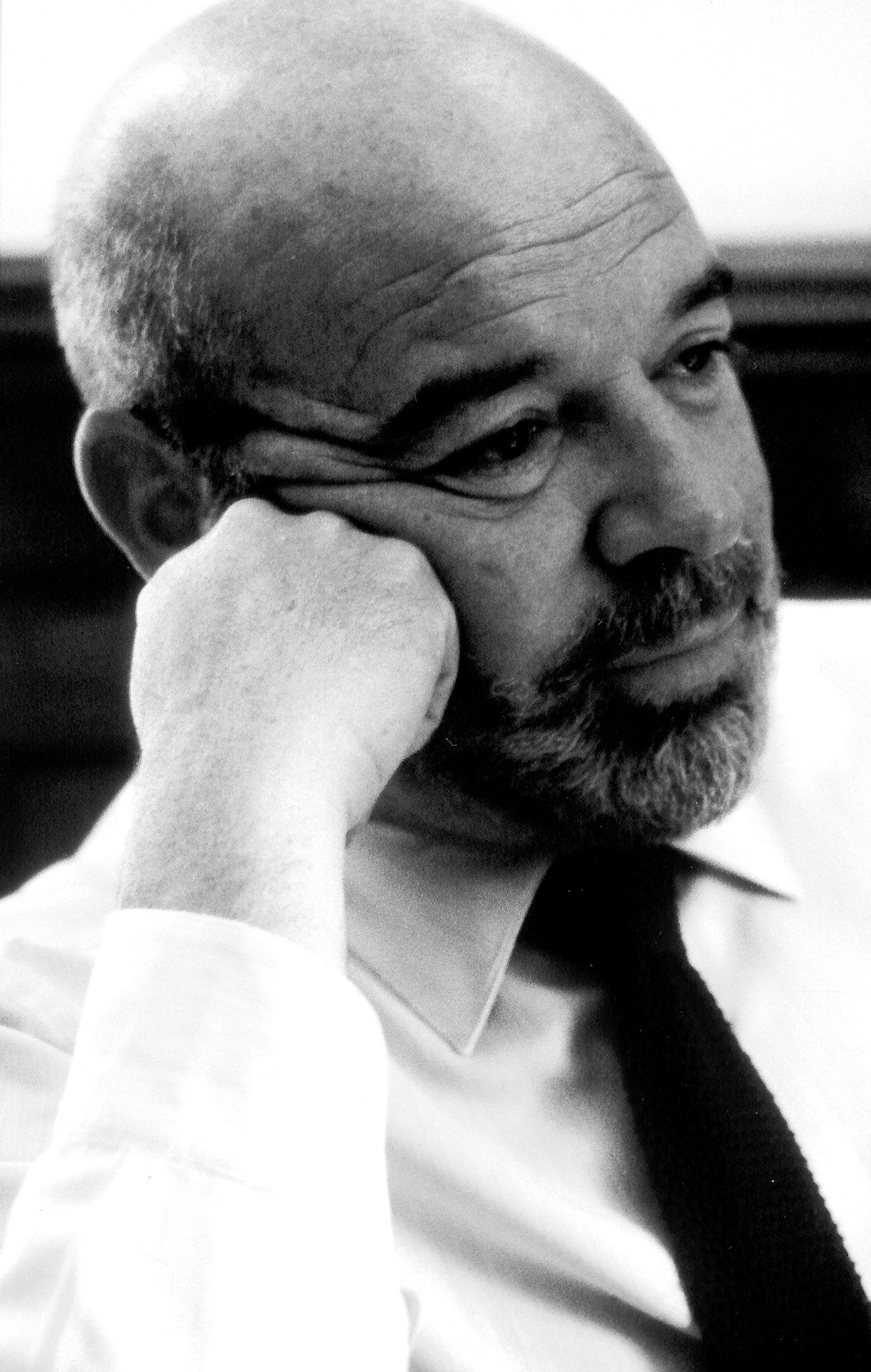
Jaime Gil de Biedma

In the early 20th century, Spanish homosexual authors such as Jacinto Benavente; Pedro de Répide; José María Luis Bruna, Marquis of Campo, Álvaro Retana, and Antonio de Hoyos y Vinent had to choose between ignoring the subject of homosexuality or presenting it in a negative light.

At the same time, other non-gay authors continued to typify their characters according to 19th-century naturalist assumptions, which presented them as pathological beings. An example of this is the setting in the Jesuit seminary described by Ramón Pérez de Ayala in A.M.D.G., la vida en los colegios de jesuitas (1910), or the one in the novel La diosa razón (1918) by Joaquín Belda, who described in detail and from a naturalist perspective the influence of a family background to explain the homosexuality of one of the characters. Others, such as Eduardo Zamacois or Manuel Bueno Bengoechea, of a progressive and republican mentality, also judged homosexuality negatively as a vice that was typical of the upper-middle class, which had received a traditional education and had lived in a decadent environment, given to luxury and pleasure.

The only ones who openly published literature that dealt with homosexual themes outside of these topics were foreigners. Among them was Chilean author Augusto d'Halmar, who published Pasión y muerte del Cura Deusto in 1924. A very daring novel for the time, it tells of the attraction that a priest feels for a boy who sings in the choir of the church where he is assigned. Throughout the story—which has a tragic, but not moralistic ending—the characters' sexuality is gradually accepted. There is also Cuban author Alfonso Hernández-Catá, who published El ángel de Sodoma (1928), and Uruguayan author Alberto Nin Frías, who published La novela del Renacimiento y otros relatos (1911), La fuente envenenada (1911), Marcos, amador de la belleza (1913), Alexis o el significado del temperamento urano (1932), and Homosexualismo creador (1932), the first treatise that painted homosexuality in a positive light.

Others took refuge in poetry, such as those belonging to the Generation of '27. Thus, the homosexual or bisexual authors of the Generation of '27 make up a long list, beginning with Federico García Lorca, Emilio Prados, Luis Cernuda, Vicente Aleixandre, and Manuel Altolaguirre. These poets were influenced by the great European homosexual writers, such as Oscar Wilde, André Gide (especially for his collection of essays Corydon), or Marcel Proust. Moreover, Poemas arabigoandaluces (1930) by Emilio García Gómez was also published after having been previewed in Revista de Occidente, which contained pederastic works by poets from Al-Andalus. The translation of Gide's articles was very controversial because of their evident homoerotic nature, and they had a powerful influence on the poetry of the time, especially in the qasidas of the Diván del Tamarit by García Lorca, who also wrote three works with an explicitly homosexual theme, although none of them was published in Spain during the author's lifetime. These are: the poem Oda a Walt Whitman, the play El público, and the Sonetos del amor oscuro. The latter remained unknown until 1983, as his family refused to publish them.

In the early 20th century, there was also a timid awakening of lesbian literature. The first work to deal with the subject was Zezé (1909) by Ángeles Vicente. The first theatrical work dealing with the subject, Un sueño de la razón by Cipriano Rivas Cherif, premiered in 1929. The only one who dared to publish homoerotic verses was Lucía Sánchez Saornil, although under the male pen name Luciano de San Saor. Other authors, such as Carmen de Burgos, made references to lesbianism in a more veiled manner. In other cases, the homosexuality of the authors is not manifested in their work (as was the case of writers Elena Fortún and Matilde Ras).

Towards the mid-1930s, a timid opening was taking place, which was cut short by the Civil War. After the war, with Lorca having been killed and most gay or bisexual poets in exile, gay culture retreated back to the obscure poetry of Vicente Aleixandre, who never publicly admitted to being gay. In 2016, many years after the poet's death, documents (such as letters and poems) with an explicit homoerotic content began to be made public, including the letters he wrote to his lover Carlos Bousoño.

Different was the case of Juan Gil-Albert, whose work is tinged with open homoeroticism, although it was less widely known. It was not until the 1980s, when he was already in his eighties, that he finally received recognition, was bestowed several awards, and saw his complete works published. There are four works in which he deals with the subject of homosexuality: Heraclés: sobre una manera de ser, an essay with his reflections on homoeroticism, written in 1955 and which took 20 years to be published in Spain. Its title refers to the Greek hero Hercules. Los arcángeles: parábola, in which he recalls experiences with other men. Tobeyo o Del amor: homenaje a México, in which he writes about the person he falls in love with during his Mexican exile. And finally, the novel Valentín: homenaje a William Shakespeare, in which he tells the story of a mature theater director who falls in love with a young actor. It has been adapted for theater and film by Juan Luis Iborra, in 1983 and 2002 respectively. According to Martínez Expósito (2011):

Gil-Albert es el prototipo del homosexual que jamás se avergüenza de sí mismo, que exhibe con constancia y orgullo su ser más íntimo, incluso en las circunstancias más adversas. (Note: English: Gil-Albert is the prototype of the homosexual who is never ashamed of himself, who constantly and proudly exhibits his most intimate self, even in the most adverse circumstances.)

Other gay poets of the time included many members of the Cántico Group, such as Ricardo Molina, Vicente Núñez, Pablo García Baena, Julio Aumente, and Juan Bernier. Younger poets Francisco Brines and Jaime Gil de Biedma were also gay. The latter, despite his rather brief poetic work, had a major influence on the Spanish poetry of his time and later. Professor Shirley Mangini González referred to him as [el] «padre espiritual» de la poesía española posmoderna. (Note: English: [The] "spiritual father" of postmodern Spanish poetry.) Gil de Biedma's poetry is characterized by its realist and ironic tone, as well as its discretion. Homoeroticism is a recurrent theme, but it is usually treated in an ambiguous and veiled manner. Thanks to the publication of his correspondence, he consciously avoided the apology of homosexuality and, except for Constantine P. Cavafy and Luis Cernuda, he was wary of openly homosexual poetry. Thus, in a letter to publisher Dionisio Cañas, he said:

El autor [gay], y el lector con él, parecen poner más atención en el sexo de la persona amada o deseada que en el amor y el deseo. (Note: English: The [gay] author, and the reader with him, seem to pay more attention to the gender of the person whom they love or desire than to love and desire themselves.)

Gil de Biedma's diaries are much more explicit than his poetry. They were published during the author's lifetime but only after having cut the most risqué passages. They were only published in full after his death.

With regards to Brines, homosexuality is a recurrent theme in his poems, always as a natural manifestation of love (as opposed to the overall social stigma or its ties to what is criminal or sinful). According to literary critic Ariadna G. García:

Se reitera en la obra de Brines esta búsqueda incesante de la Pureza, en un intento por ennoblecer, moralmente, la homosexualidad. (Note: English: Brines' work reiterates this incessant search for Purity, in an attempt to morally ennoble homosexuality.)

== After the Francoist dictatorship ==
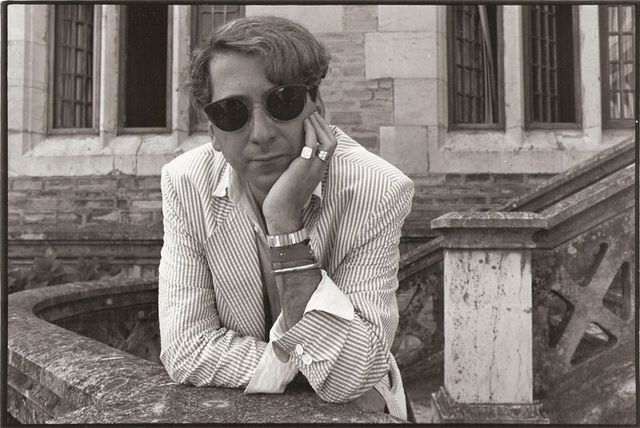
Luis Antonio de Villena in 1989.

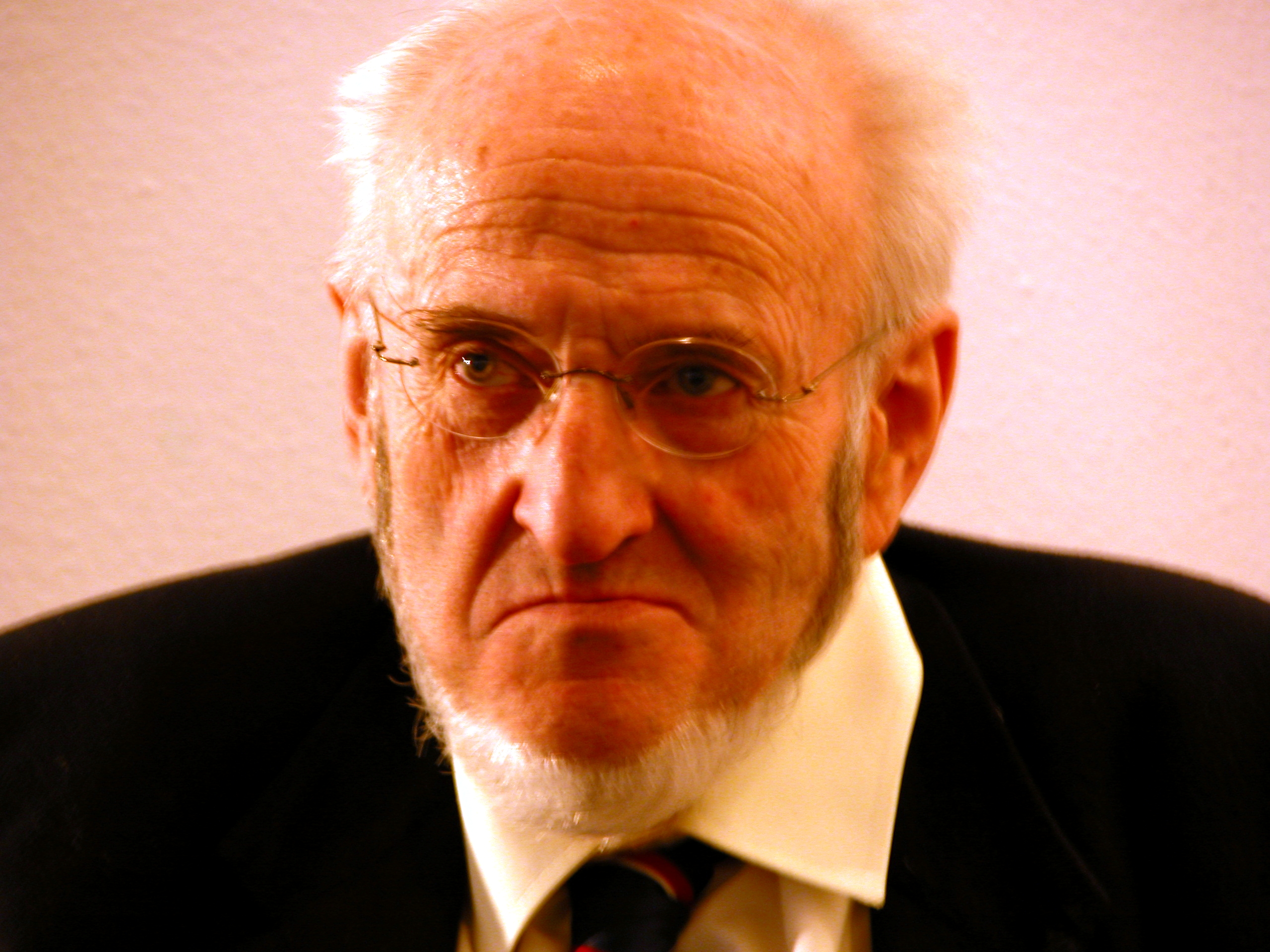
Álvaro Pombo at the Ateneo Riojano (2005).

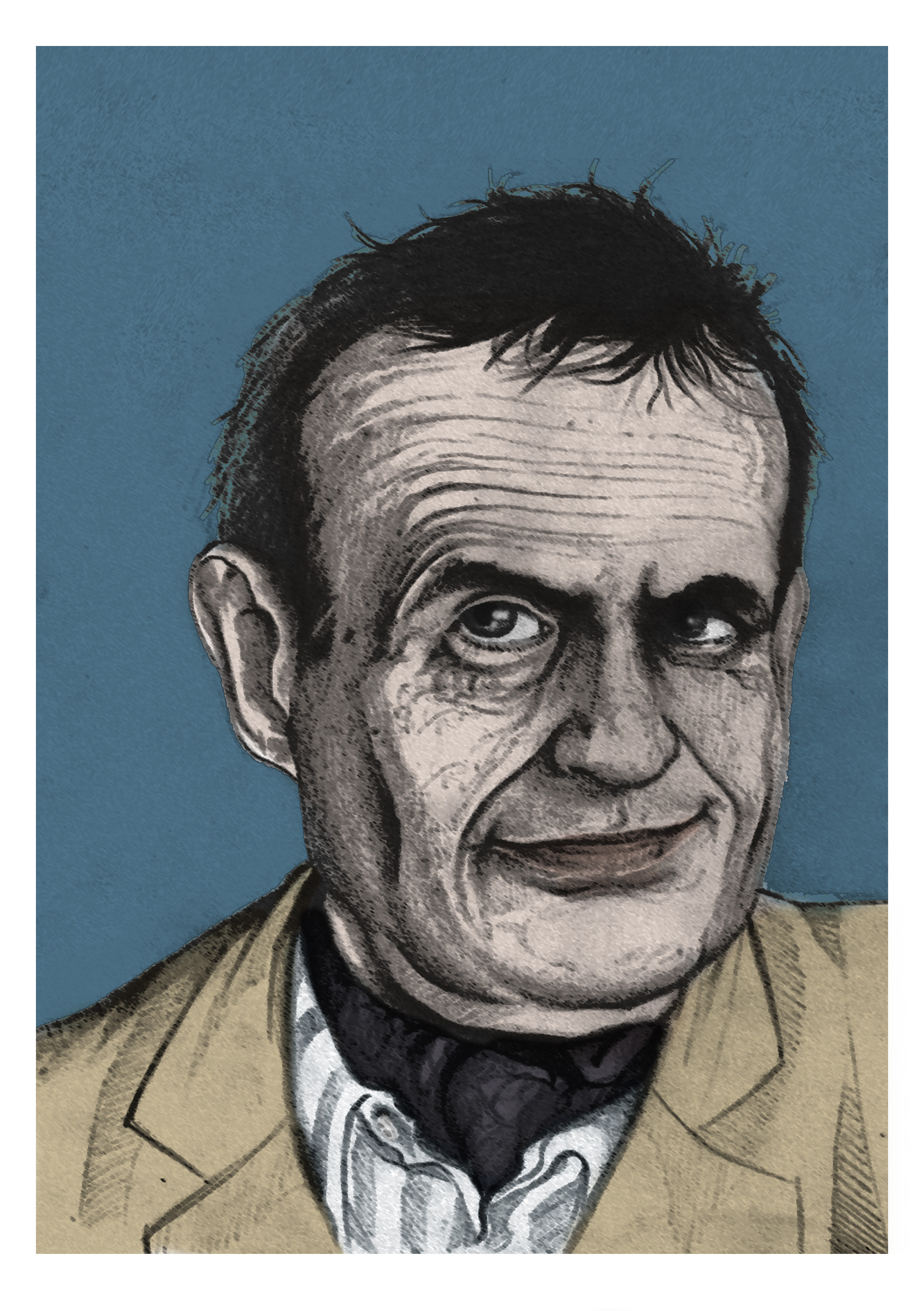
Portrait of Terenci Moix by Albert Pons.

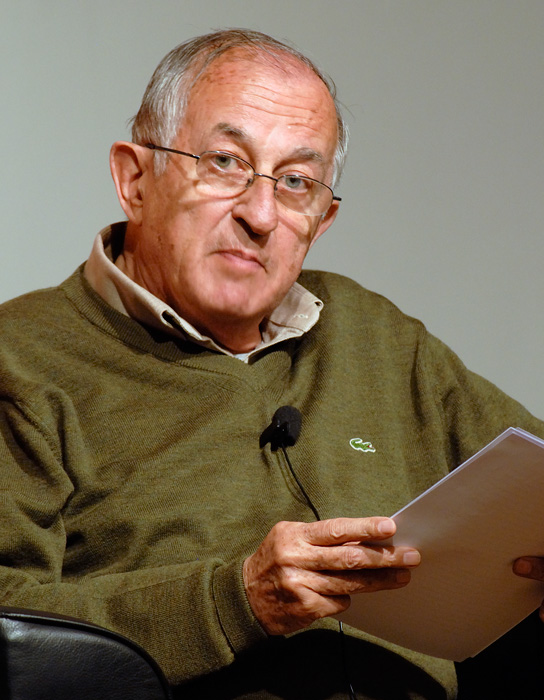
Juan Goytisolo photographed by Peter Groth at the Cervantes Institute in Berlin (2008).

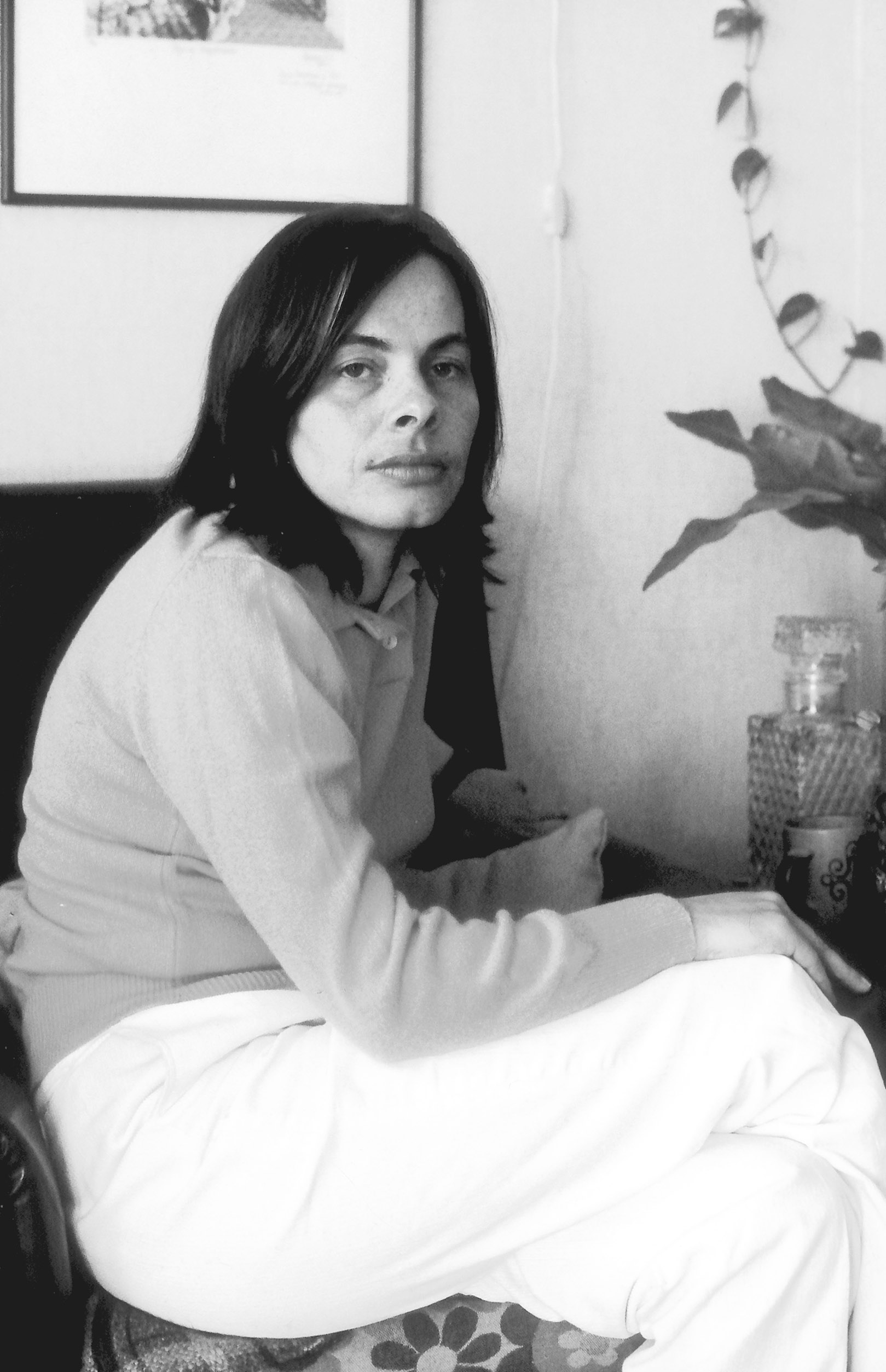
Uruguayan-Spanish writer Cristina Peri Rossi in 1986.

After Franco's death and the arrival of democracy in Spain for a second time (the first time was during the Second Republic), there was greater freedom in the publishing world and a resurfacing of the theme of homosexuality (although society was still fundamentally sexist and homophobic during those years of the Transition). As late as 1981, Íñigo Cavero, the minister of culture of the Union of the Democratic Centre, was retaliating against a radio program on Radio Nacional de España that had discussed the issue of homosexuality.

Oddly enough, despite the political activism waged by some groups during the 1970s, literature in the 1980s barely dealt with these issues. The social invisibility of homosexuals during the Francoist regime and the lack of Spanish-language examples in gay literature meant that new authors (in the case of those who intended to engage in "high culture") took as their models such figures as Oscar Wilde, Jean Genet, Marcel Proust, Arthur Rimbaud, or the Comte de Lautréamont. Those authors who intended to produce more commercial works set their sights on the world of mass culture, with Hollywood cinema being especially important for them.

Among the authors whose success came at the end of the dictatorship or with the Transition, those who stand out include Juan Goytisolo (the most influential outside Spain and the one who continues the tradition of Jean Genet's poètes maudits with notable works such as Coto vedado and Carajicomedia), Luis Antonio de Villena (Ante el espejo, Chicos, Divino, Oro y locura sobre Baviera, and El mal mundo), Antonio Gala, and Terenci Moix, publicly known for their frequent appearances on television and for being some of the first to publicly come out as gay in the late 1970s.

The novel Todos los parques no son un paraíso by Antonio Roig, a former Carmelite, was published in 1976 to widespread success by Editorial Planeta. It contained autobiographical elements and described his sexual encounters in London, where he had taken refuge after being expelled from the convent.

Starting from the end of the Francoist regime, the novel that best reflects the change in the mentality of homosexuals (and of Spanish society as a whole) is by a gay author, Manuel Vázquez Montalbán, who dealt with the issue in his novel Los alegres muchachos de Atzavara (1987).

Renowned gay authors who started their literary career in the 1970s or 1980s include Álvaro Pombo, Vicente Molina Foix (La comunión de los atletas), and Leopoldo María Panero. The latter developed a modern style and was an example of a poète maudit, leading a disorderly and scandalous life, with increasing psychiatric issues that, from the 1980s onwards, led to his confinement in various psychiatric hospitals.

Also worthy of mention are Alejandro Céspedes, Leopoldo Alas Mínguez (for his poetry and his novel El extraño caso de Gaspar Ganijosa), Vicente García Cervera (winner of the 1985 La sonrisa vertical literary award for erotic novels with Las cartas de Saguia-El-Hambra, his first published work), Jaume Cela, Eduardo Mendicutti, Alberto Cardín, Mariano García Torres, Pedro Menchén, and Agustín Gómez-Arcos (who wrote a good part of his work while in exile and in the French language). Mendicutti was the first to include a "leather-type" relationship in one of his novels (Yo no tengo la culpa de haber nacido tan sexy, 1997), in which he used a humorous, campy tone. He was also one of the first to write about a homosexual relationship between cowboys, with his novel Duelo en Marilyn City.

Catalan-language authors include Lluís Maria Todó (El joc del mentider, L'adoració perpètua), Biel Mesquida, Mallorcan poet Blai Bonet (El mar), Valencian Lluís Fernàndez (L'anarquista nu), and poets Narcís Comadira, Jaume Creus, and Gaspar Jaén i Urban. Terenci Moix also has works in Catalan, although he wrote most of his works in Spanish. Among his books, his treatment of homosexuality stands out in El día que murió Marilyn, Mundo macho, Amanmi, Alfredo, Garras de astracán, and El peso de la paja. Eduardo Haro Ibars was belligerent in the fight for homosexual vindication, although not all his works reflect this in the same extent.

Rafael Chirbes's writing career was launched in 1988 when he was a finalist for the Herralde literary award with his homosexual-themed novel Mimoun. This is also a major theme in his work En la lucha final (1991) and in Paris-Austerlitz, published posthumously in 2016. In the 1980s, Alberto Cardín published three books of poems: Paciencia del destino (1980), Despojos (1981), and Indículo de sombras (1983).

In theater, Francisco Ors's play Contradanza, a historical fantasy based on the assumption that Queen Elizabeth I of England was actually a man, was presented as a vindication of homosexuality. It premiered in 1980 at the Lara Theater in Madrid, under the direction of José Tamayo, with music by Antón García Abril, and actors José Luis Pellicena, Manuel Gallardo and Gemma Cuervo in the main roles. Flor de Otoño, by playwright José María Rodríguez Méndez, deals with homosexuality and transvestism. Written in 1973, it did not premiere until 1982, after a film version by screenwriter, producer and director Pedro Olea, A Man Called Autumn Flower, had been released.

=== The great emergence in the 1990s ===
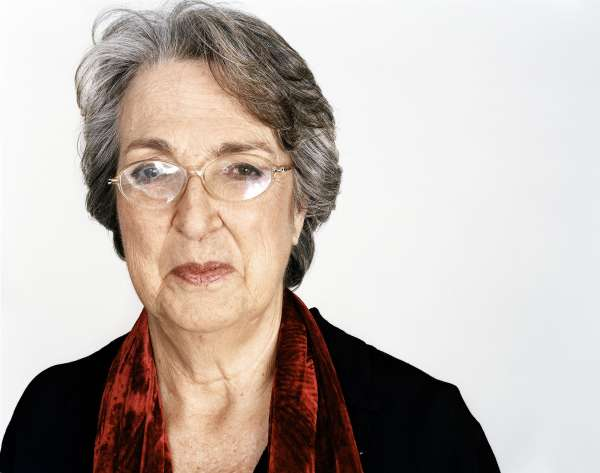
Esther Tusquets

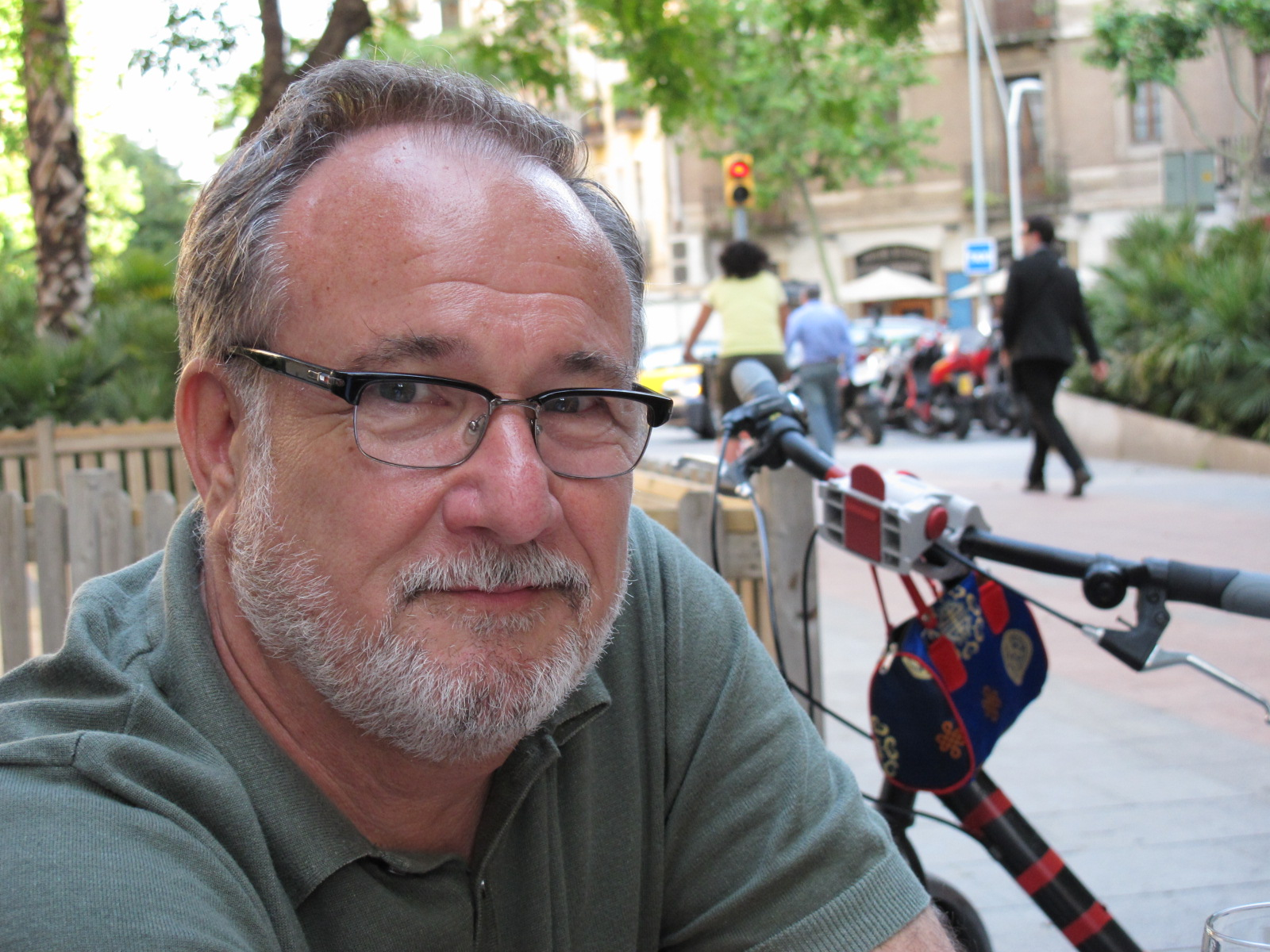
Lluís Maria Todó

It was not until the 1990s when there was a great emergence of publications on homosexual themes, not only in the poetry and literary genres, but also theoretical publications that focused on queer theory and a criticism of the heterosexist system. Gràcies per la propina by Ferran Torrent stands apart from many novels of previous decades (those by Pombo, Chirbes, Lluís Fernàndez, or Eduardo Haro Ibars, for example) by not leading its characters to a tragic or lonely end, but rather resolving the conflict created by homosexuality in terms of acceptance and normalization instead of tragedy or isolation and concealment. In the narrative of the 1990s there is an evident playing down and normalization of the homosexual experience in literature.

The works that have had the greatest commercial impact include the memoirs of Terenci Moix, the works by Luis Antonio de Villena set in a historical setting, and the novel Patty Diphusa (1991) by Pedro Almodóvar, written as the (fictitious) autobiography of a porn actress whose partners are almost all gay and bisexual. In 1992, Carlos Sanrune published his debut novel El gladiador de Chueca, today considered a classic of gay literature from Spain and one of the first novels on this subject translated into a foreign language. (Note: It was translated into French in 2003 by Paco Valdés, under the title Fleur de macadam.) It deals with the adventures of a rent boy in Chueca, a gay neighborhood in Madrid. Novels such as De hombre a hombre (1997) by Antonio Fontana were also published around this time.

A special case was that of Peruvian author Jaime Bayly, whose debut novel No se lo digas a nadie (1994), was a best-selling success in Spain and received praise from critic Miguel García-Posada of El País: la primera y espectacular novela de un joven escritor peruano. (Note: English: The first and spectacular novel by a young Peruvian writer)

In 1999, journalist and critic Luis Algorri published the novel Algún día te escribiré esto, which was subsequently translated into several languages, including French and German. It has been considered one of the best works of Spanish gay literature.

Bisexuality is one of the main themes of Antonio Gala's novel La regla de tres, published in 1996. The protagonist, Octavio Lerma, is an older, bisexual writer who enters into a relationship with both Asia, a woman his age, and her husband, a young man named Leo. The novel was not well received by critics. Luis de la Peña of El País criticized its superficiality and lack of believability.

Also around this time the first lesbian authors started to be noticed. Gloria Fuertes never wanted her homosexuality to be made public, but other poets did openly declare it, such as Andrea Luca or Cristina Peri Rossi. The latter had begun her literary career in Uruguay in the 1960s. However, she went into exile in 1972 in Barcelona, where she wrote most of her work, containing strong political undertones.

Other authors have dealt with themes of love between women, such as Ana María Moix, Ana Rossetti, Esther Tusquets (El mismo mar de todos los veranos, El amor es un juego solitario, Varada tras el último naufragio, Con la miel en los labios), Carme Riera, Elena Fortún, and Isabel Franc (Entre todas las mujeres, Con pedigree, Plumas de doble filo, La mansión de las tríbadas). Also, Lucía Etxebarría, in her novel Beatriz y los cuerpos celestes (which won the Premio Nadal literary prize in 1998) and later works such as Nosotras que no somos como las demás or many of the stories in Una historia de amor como otra cualquiera, in which lesbian characters coexist with other heterosexual characters, showing human sexuality from a broad perspective, without reducing lesbianism to a forbidden subject. In 1998, Clara Usón published her first novel, Noches de San Juan (which won the Lumen literary award for female authors that same year). It tells the story of the Saint John's Eve festivities in Ciutadella de Menorca, with a style that Ana María Moix described as almodovariano. (Note: English: In the style of Pedro Almodóvar) Moreover, Maria Mercè Marçal is worthy of note as an author in the Catalan language.

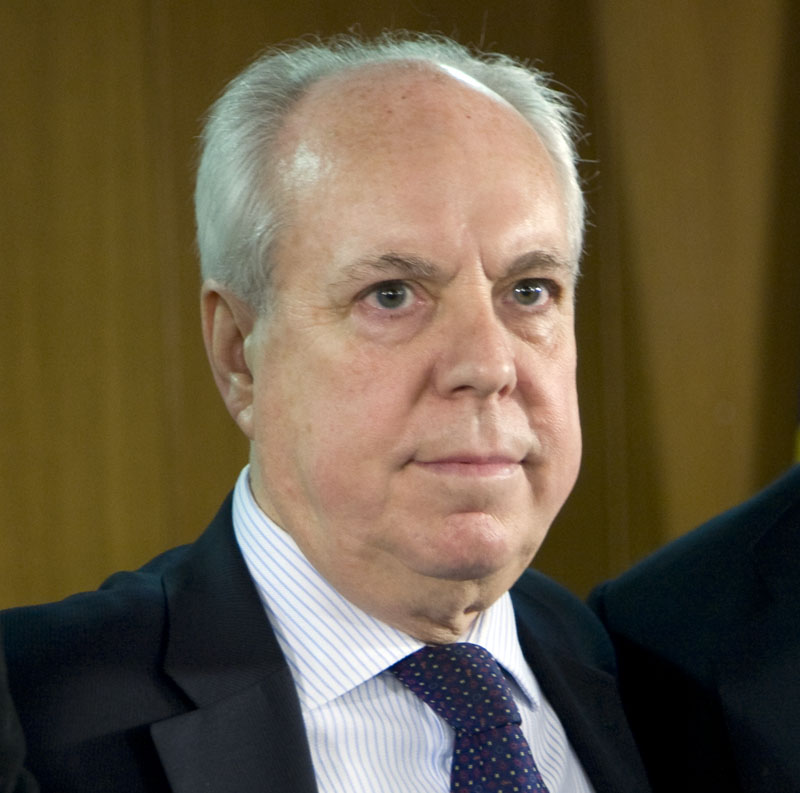
Eduardo Mendicutti in 2011

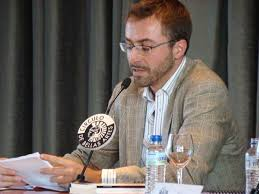
Poet Rafael-José Díaz at the Círculo de Bellas Artes in Madrid (2011)

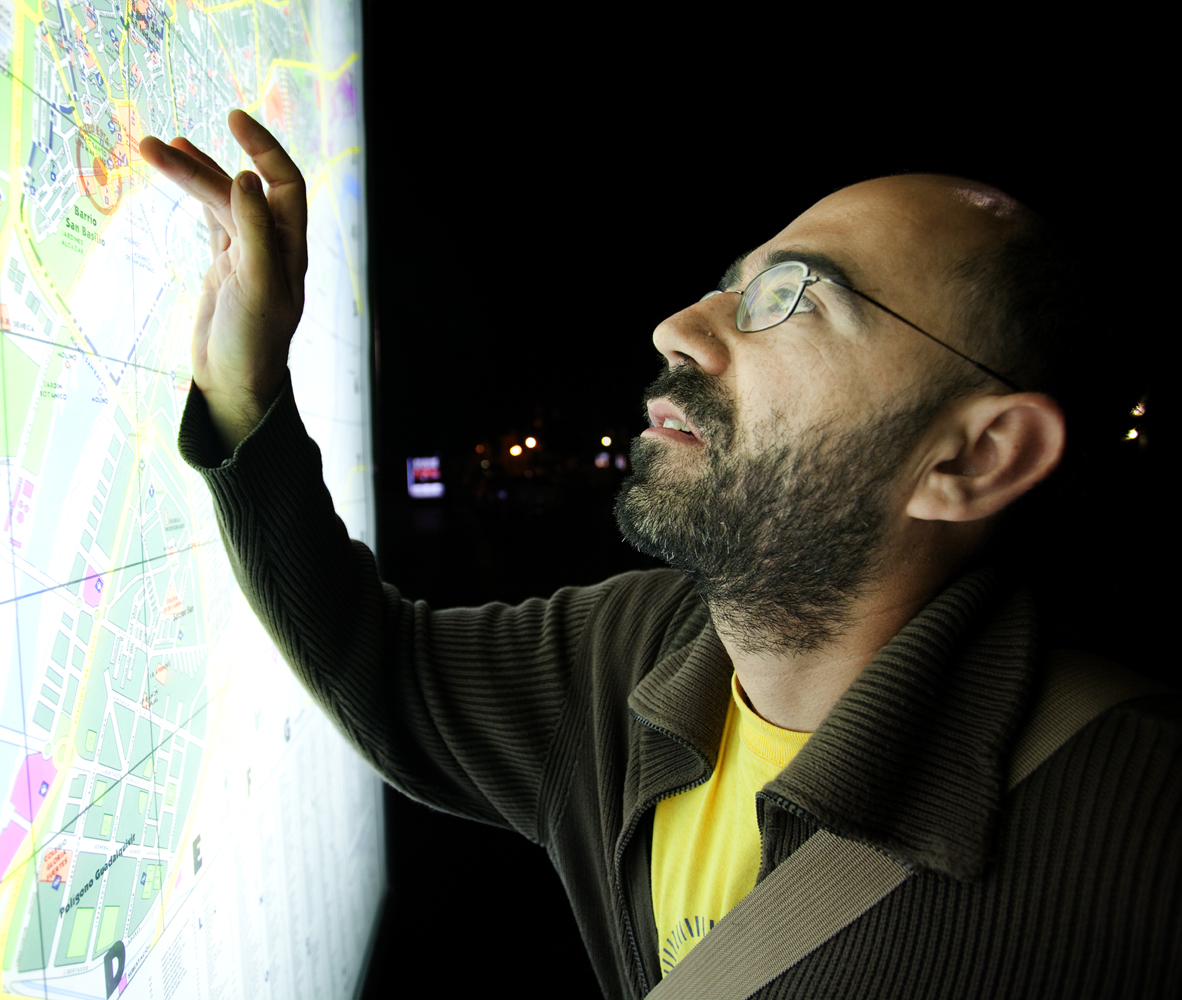
Oscar Esquivias in Córdoba (2010). Photograph by Asís G. Ayerbe.

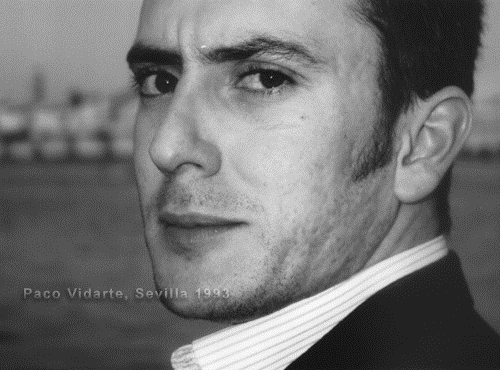
Essayist and activist Paco Vidarte in Seville (1993). Photograph by Susanne Lieber.

==== Theater ====
In theater, there were also plays in which homosexuality was the main theme, such as Qué más da by Jesús Alviz, a play with a biographical background about a writer and the world of social alienation, drugs, and homosexuality. Testamento, by Josep Maria Benet i Jornet, tells of the relationship between an educated homosexual professor and a rent boy. The play attracted the critics' attention because of how crudely it exposed a sordid homosexual relationship. According to theater critic Lorenzo López Sancho, it was [una] perversa forma de teatro bien hecho que no es lo mismo, quizá, que buen Teatro. (Note: English: [A] perverse form of well done theater, which is not the same, perhaps, as good theater.) The play was adapted to film in 1998 with the title Amic/Amat (Beloved/Friend), directed by Ventura Pons.

Another play that is also famous due to its subsequent film adaptation was Krámpack by Jordi Sánchez, which premiered in 1998.

In popular theater, one playwright who dealt with homosexual themes was Rafael Mendizábal, who had enjoyed great box-office success in the 1980s with comedies starring Florinda Chico and Rafaela Aparicio. In 1994, his play Feliz cumpleaños, señor ministro (Ciudad de San Sebastián award, 1992) premiered at the Victoria Eugenia Theater in San Sebastián. The play addresses the themes of homosexuality and transsexuality. However, according to playwright Pedro Víllora, his most important work on homosexuality was Madre amantísima, which premiered in Madrid in 2003. It represented a significant development in that it addressed the issue from the point of view of someone with conservative ideological assumptions.

Moreover, popular variety theater in alternative circuits has always had shows of a markedly gay nature, based on cross-dressing, humor, and cabaret. Miss Shangay Lily achieved certain notoriety in the Madrid nightlife of the 1990s for organizing the so-called Shangay Tea Dance, which brought to Spain the Anglo-Saxon concept of theme parties in different venues. An attempt to give a more literary character to this type of celebrations and shows was the play Sota, caballo y gay by Manu Berástegui, which was performed at the Teatro Estudio in Madrid in 1999.

==== Essay ====
Among the numerous essays that were also written on these themes, the ones that stand out include Homografías and Extravíos, both written by Ricardo Llamas and Francisco Javier Vidarte, and Salir del armario by Alfonso Llopart. Moreover, journalist Joan Martínez Vergel published a book of interviews with members of the gay community in Spain, titled Gái, ¿el quinto poder?

== 21st century ==
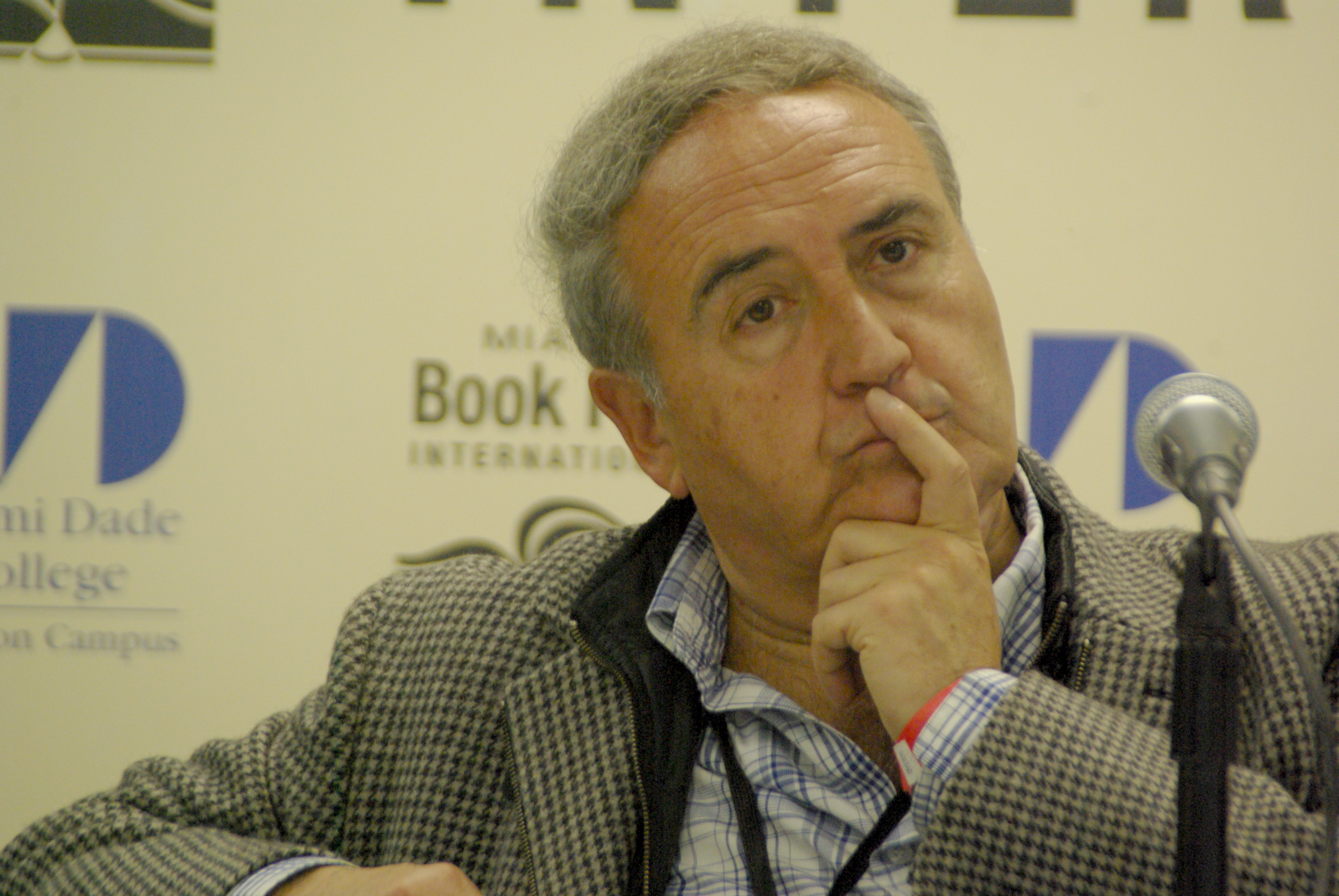
Vicente Molina Foix at the Miami Book Fair International (2011)

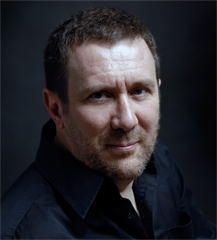
Luisgé Martín in a photograph by Germán Gómez González (2012)

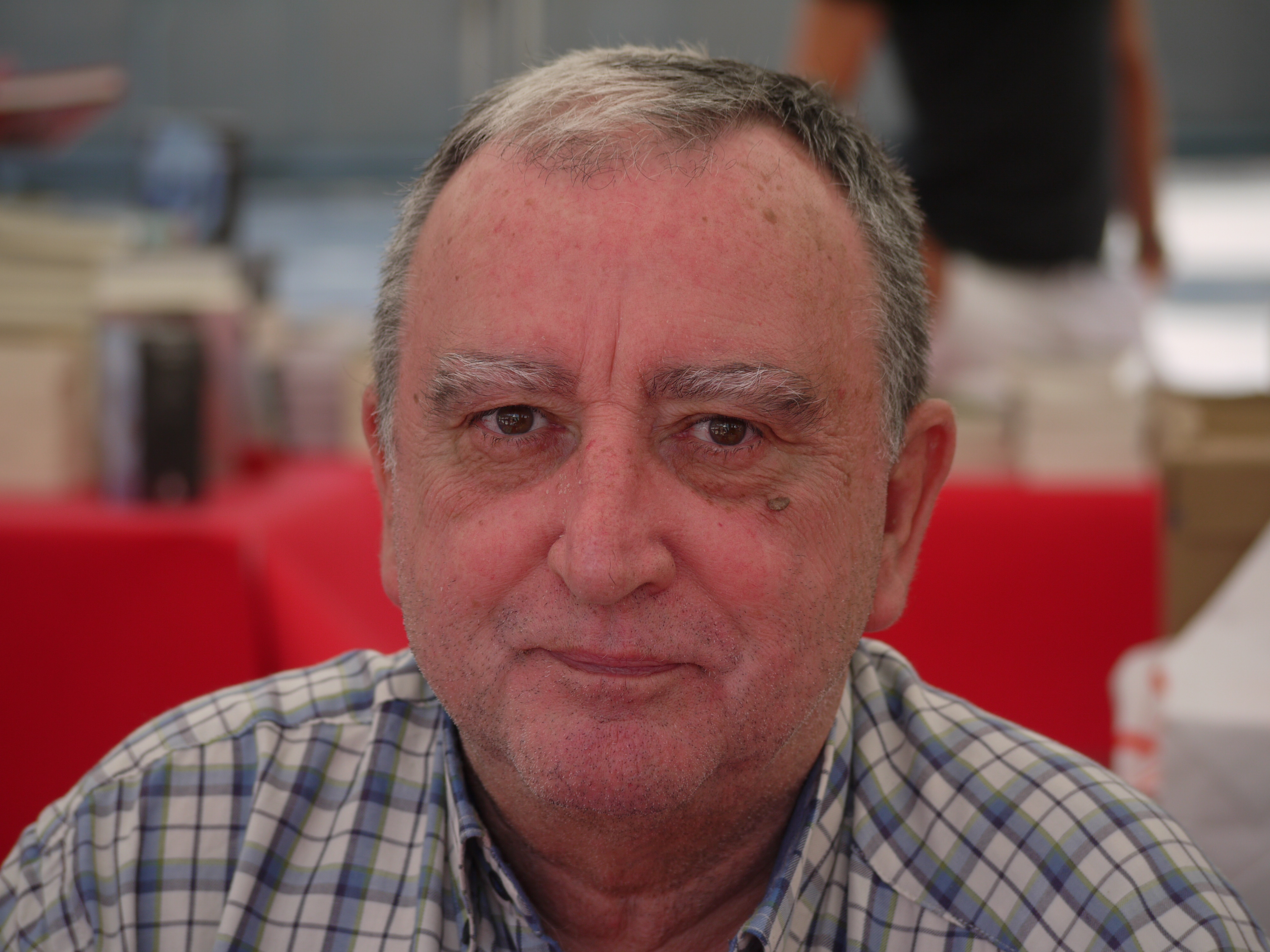
Rafael Chirbes in 2009, at La Comédie du Livre de Montpellier

=== Narrative ===
The normalization of homosexuality in the 21st-century Spanish society also manifested itself in the publishing world. Works with this theme were no longer being considered underground or exceptional. Literary critic Miguel Rojo referred thusly to the book of short stories Pampanitos verdes by Óscar Esquivias:

Una homosexualidad aceptada, libre de cualquier estigma o vergüenza. Una homosexualidad del siglo xxi en un país avanzado que no genera más conflictos que si el protagonista fuera heterosexual o bizco. (Note: English: A homosexuality that is accepted, free of any stigma or shame. A homosexuality of the 21st century in a progressive country that does not create more conflict than if the protagonist were heterosexual or cross-eyed.)

Even heterosexual authors address issues with strong homoerotic undertones in their plots, such as Juan Bonilla in Los príncipes nubios (which won the Biblioteca Breve literary award), Marta Sanz with her series of novels about Zarco, a gay detective, or Javier Reverte in El médico de Ifni.

This normalized experience of homosexuality was highlighted by critics upon reviewing the novel Isaac y las dudas by Lluís Maria Todó, originally written in Catalan (as Isaac i els dubtes) and translated into Spanish by Luis Algorri. The treatment of homosexuality has been a constant in Todó's work. In 2015, he published L'últim mono or El último mono (in Catalan and Spanish, respectively), a novel about a young gay man who is addicted to heroin and relapses for the third time after trying to get rehabilitated.

Eduardo Mendicutti's novel California was published in 2005. It reflects the evolution of homosexuals in Spain and how, at the time of the discussion surrounding same-sex marriage in Spain, the main character becomes aware of the need to take sides, get politically involved, and make changes in society. In a way, the novel reflects the path of homosexuals in the country, how they went from being ostracized and scorned to being an organized and influential community that managed to get legal recognition of their rights. His novel Otra vida para vivirla contigo (2013) tells a romantic story between a councilman and a writer. According to critic José María Pozuelo Yvancos, it is one more sign of [la] normalización romántica, en el sentido de sentimental, de la literatura gay. (Note: English: [The] romantic normalization, in a sentimental sense, of gay literature) In 2016, Mendicutti published Furias divinas, a novel about transvestites set in La Algaida (a literary reference to Sanlúcar de Barrameda, the author's hometown).

The case of Álvaro Pombo is especially significant: his early work was ambiguous and cryptic, but has gradually become more honest about homosexuality, which, in his case, he has experienced in a conflictive manner. Professor Alfredo Martínez Expósito considers this an example of internalized homophobia. In 2006, Pombo published Contra natura, a novel in which the treatment of homosexuality shows a determination and depth rarely seen in Spanish literature. The novel covers a wide period of time, from the first Francoism to the early years of the 21st century, and portrays characters of Pombo's own generation. According to literary critic José María Pozuelo Yvancos, the novel is:

(...) cruda, explícita, tremenda, esforzada en sumarse al asunto de otro modo, contra la moral de la trivialización, pensando un problema, con igual empuje que siempre tuvo (ya lo hizo antes en «El cielo raso», y antes en «Los delitos insignificantes») y con una introspección psicológica en sus personajes como he conocido pocas. (Note: English: (...) raw, explicit, tremendous, striving to add to the issue from another point of view, against the morality of trivialization, thinking about a problem, with the same drive he always had (he did it before in El cielo raso, and before that in Los delitos insignificantes) and with a psychological introspection in his characters like few I have ever seen.)

In the novel's epilogue, the author himself, Álvaro Pombo, presents the autobiographical code that unlocks a story featuring different models of experiencing homosexuality. One of them, embodied in the character of Javier Salazar, seems to be the closest to Pombo's own experience: that of an educated, intellectual man, whose relationship with his sexuality is problematic and unsatisfactory, as he cannot experience it with a carefree, happy, or full abandon, and he harbors feelings close to those of Thomas Mann, who linked homosexuality with death.

The multi-narrative novel Viaje al centro de la infamia, written by historian Miguel Ángel Sosa Machín, was published in 2006. It is set in the mid-1950s and alludes to a real place, the Colonia Agrícola Penitenciaria de Tefía in Fuerteventura—a prison farm and concentration camp during the Francoist dictatorship, set up to "rehabilitate" homosexuals through forced labor, especially breaking rocks.

Leopoldo Alas Mínguez's novel La loca aventura de vivir, a light-hearted story set in the neighborhood of Chueca, was published in 2009.

That same year, Núria Añó's novel Núvols baixos was published in Catalan. (Note: Published in English in 2020 by Babelcube Incorporated as Lowering Clouds, translation by Eliza Graham, ISBN 9781071539446) Although its unquestionable protagonist is Gabriele, the novel tells the lives of three women in search of their identity after their entire existence. A balance that shows the complexity of the three situations and where their sexuality fluctuates and all types of love are represented.

The protagonist of the detective novel El primer caso de Cate Maynes (2011), by Clara Asunción García, is a lesbian. It combines elements typical of crime novels, but also of romantic and erotic ones, to the point of openly depicting its protagonist in erotic scenes.

The novel La edad de la ira by Nando López was also published in 2011. With it, López became a finalist for the 2010 Premio Nadal literary award. It was adapted into a television series of the same name. Starting with this novel, López began a prolific career in which he alternates between playwriting and narrative writing, with novels for adults and young people. Among his adult literary works with LGTB protagonists and themes, titles that stand out include Hasta nunca, Peter Pan, La inmortalidad del cangrejo, El sonido de los cuerpos, Cuando todo era fácil, and, especially, Los elegidos, published in 2023. In the latter, he addresses the persecution of homosexuals in the 1950s after the reform of the Law of Vagrants and Miscreants and the creation of concentration camps such as the one in Tefía. As for his young adult books with LGTBI+ protagonists, titles include Cuál es tu lucha, Nadie nos oye, and La versión de Eric, in which the main character is a trans teenager. With the latter, López won the Premio Gran Angular award for young adult literature in 2020.

In 2014, writer Vicente Molina Foix and poet Luis Cremades published their co-written book El invitado amargo. It is interspersed with chapters written by each of the authors, in which they reminisce about their relationship dating back decades, starting in 1981. According to literary critic Santos Sanz Villanueva:

Este libro de género indefinido —¿novela, crónica, autobiografía?— podría haberse ceñido a su meollo, los vericuetos transitados por una difícil relación amorosa, pero alcanza un valor documental no secundario. En buen medida ofrece un curioso testimonio del mundillo literario madrileño de los años 80 desde la perspectiva parcial de un grupo de sus protagonistas. (Note: English: This book, of an undefined genre—is it a novel, a historical account, an autobiography?—could have stuck to its roots, the twists and turns of a difficult love affair, but it achieves a documentary value that is not secondary. To a large extent, it offers a curious testimony of the Madrid literary scene of the 1980s from the partial perspective of a group of its protagonists.)

Also in 2014, Almudena Grandes's novel Las tres bodas de Manolita describes the situation of homosexual people in Spain immediately after the Spanish Civil War through characters who, although secondary, are key factors in the narrative, such as Paco Román, la Palmera, and la madre Carmen, as well as the real writer Antonio de Hoyos y Vinent, turned into one of the characters. In that same year, poet Ariadna G. García published her first novel, Inercia (Baile del Sol, 2014), in which one of the protagonists is a lesbian.

Apart from the aforementioned writers, new gay authors appeared or got established. These include David Vilaseca (L'aprenentatge de la soledat, 2007), in Catalan, as well as the following, in Spanish: Óscar Hernández Campano (El viaje de Marcos, winner of the Fourth Premio Odisea award for LGBT literature), Susana Hernández (writer) (who created the character Santana, a lesbian detective with the National Police Corps who is the protagonist of several novels, such as Curvas peligrosas and Contra las cuerdas), Luisgé Martín (La muerte de Tadzio), Roberto Enríquez Higueras (Mansos), Íñigo Sota Heras (with his first novel, Las distancias cortas, 2008), Óscar Esquivias (Jerjes conquista el mar, La marca de Creta, Pampanitos verdes, Andarás perdido por el mundo), Ángel Román (Licantropía emocional), Chris Pueyo (El Chico de las Estrellas), José Luis Serrano (Hermano, Sebastián en la laguna, Lo peor de todo es la luz), and Alejandro Palomas (A pesar de todo, 2002; El tiempo del corazón, 2002; Una madre, 2014).

Others who stand out include Libertad Morán (Llévame a casa, finalist for the 2003 Premio Odisea award), Josa Fructuoso, Marta Garzás, and Mila Martínez. The latter won the Premio Fundación Arena award for LGBT+ literature for her novel La daga fenicia, the fourth installment in a series of novels she began publishing in 2009.

Rafael Chirbes' last novel, Paris-Austerlitz, on which he was working until a few months before his death, was published posthumously in 2016. It contains autobiographical elements. Set in Paris, it tells the story of the gay relationship between a young painter from Madrid and a worker of Norman descent, much older than him, who would later contract AIDS. That same year, Luisgé Martín published his autobiographical book El amor del revés (Anagrama, 2016), a memoir in which he narrates how he gradually came to terms with his homosexuality. In 2017, Luis Antonio de Villena published his memoir Dorados días de sol y noche (Pre-Textos), encompassing his life from 1974 to 1996 and in which the homosexual scene, especially that of Madrid, is featured prominently.

Literary works written by trans, queer, and non-binary authors also gained prominence in the first decades of the 21st century, with writers such as Paul B. Preciado, Alana Portero, Roberta Marrero, and Ángelo Néstore, with the influence of Latin American authors such as Pedro Lemebel and Camila Sosa Villada.

==== Narrative anthologies ====
Asalto a Oz, antología de relatos de la nueva narrativa queer (Dos Bigotes, 2019) brings together fifteen authors who represent the evolution of LGBT+ issues in recent years According to Luisgé Martín, with regards to the work of previous generations (exemplified by the anthology Lo que no se dice), the youngest ones have left behind the problematic approach to their homosexuality, they question the division by gender, transsexuality becomes a main argument (with the social condemnation that was previously reserved for homosexuality), the number of women authors has increased, there are no humorous themes, and short stories no longer aspire to fit into the Borgesian narrative model.

==== Monographs by lesbian authors ====
Due to the scarce representation of lesbian authors in published works as a whole, the anthology Voces en la narrativa lésbica (2007), edited by Minerva Salado, is worthy of note. It includes twenty authors (not only from Spain but also Latin America) and a wide variety of texts in prose, verse, and poetic prose.

The book of short stories Ábreme con cuidado (2015) posed the challenge of paying homage to great female literary figures—Patricia Highsmith, Virginia Woolf, Marguerite Yourcenar, Carson McCullers, and Gloria Fuertes, among others—by turning them into the protagonists of unpublished stories written by Isabel Franc, Clara Asunción García, Pilar Bellver, Carmen Samit, Gloria Fortún, Lola Robles, Carmen Nestares, Carmen Cuenca, and Gloria Bosch Maza.

==== Monographs by gay authors ====
The anthology Tu piel en mi boca (Egales) was published in 2004. It includes homoerotic stories by Luis Antonio de Villena, Marcelo Soto, Lawrence Schimel, Norberto Luis Romero, Pablo Peinado, Mario Merlino, Eduardo Mendicutti, Antonio Jiménez Ariza, José Infante, Juan P. Herráiz, Francisco J. Gutiérrez, Luisgé Martín, Luis Deulofeu, Moncho Borrajo, Luis Algorri, and Leopoldo Alas Mínguez.

Lo que no se dice (Dos Bigotes) was published in 2014. It is an anthology with unpublished stories by Spanish gay authors who contributed their personal vision on various topics characteristic of Spanish society in which homosexuality is not fully accepted: football, bullfighting, religion, country living, etc. As a result, Luis Antonio de Villena wrote about the military service; Eduardo Mendicutti, about a homosexual bullfighter (although the author is repulsed by bullfighting); Luisgé Martín, about football; Lluís Maria Todó, about the Boy Scouts in Catalonia in the 1960s; Nando López, about homophobia in secondary education; Óscar Esquivias, about Catholic catechists; Luis Cremades, about a parish choir; Lawrence Schimel, about flamenco; José Luis Serrano, about homosexuality within the working class; Óscar Hernández Campano set his story in a farmhouse in the Basque Country; and Álvaro Domínguez Rodríguez-Volta wrote about a conservative family. The book was illustrated by Raúl Lázaro.

=== Poetry ===
The poetic discourse on homosexuality, according to poet Martín Rodríguez-Gaona, is manifested in the Spanish poetry of the early 21st century with great moderation and caution to avoid controversy.

For journalist Jordi Sierra Márquez, one exception would be Javier Gato's Diario de un gato nocturno, a collection of poems that insists on describing an explicit sexuality, related to drug use and existing in the fringes of society.

Authors who stand out include: Juan Antonio González Iglesias, Luis Muñoz, Rafael-José Díaz, and Ariadna G. García. According to Luis Antonio de Villena, González Iglesias is uno de los tres mejores poetas nuevos de España. (Note: English: One of the best new poets in Spain)

Luis Muñoz's poems are characterized by a sentimental minimalism and sometimes evoke gay authors such as Juan Gil-Albert or Paul Verlaine. According to critic José Luis García Martín, the two versions of Muñoz's poem Homosexualidad—published in his book Correspondencias (Visor, 2001)—reveal the author's desire to represent two stages in the erotic development of a person: a first one of isolation, and then one of acceptance.

On his part, Rafael-José Díaz published Antes del eclipse (2003-2005) (Pre-Textos, 2007), in which he delves deeper into the issues he had previously written about and also approaches homosexual eroticism in a frank manner.

Ariadna G. García has addressed the theme of love in her five poetry books without hiding her homosexuality. Her work sometimes explores social criticism and denounces homophobia and discrimination.

Other LGBT+ poets who became known in the 2000s include: J. Ricart, Iñaki Echarte, Sofía Rhei, Ángel Borreguero, Sara Torres, and Pol Guasch.

==== Poetry anthologies ====
Some works that are worthy of mention include: Mujeres que aman a mujeres (Vitruvio, 2012)—an anthology of lesbian poetry edited by Carmen Moreno Pérez—Blanco nuclear. Antología de poesía gay y lésbica última (Sial, 2011) by Luis Daniel Pino—an anthology of poems by Alberto Acerete, Cristian Alcaraz, Ariadna G. García, Sofía Rhei, and Lawrence Schimel, among others—and Correspondencias, una antología de poesía contemporánea LGTB española (Egales, 2017), a bilingual (English and Spanish) anthology of contemporary Spanish LGTB poetry. (Note: Authors included are: Ian Bermúdez Raventós, María Ángeles Cabré, Dionisio Cañas, Pepe Carretero, María Castrejón, Luis Cremades, Jesús Encinar, Ángel Erro, José Manuel Lucía Megías, David Navascués, Ángelo Nestore, Pablo Peinado, Lawrence Schimel, and José Luis Serrano)

=== Theater ===
Homosexuality is present in several works by Catalan author Josep Maria Miró. His play Gang bang (2011) is set in a gay bar during the Pope's visit to Barcelona and contains explicit scenes of gay sex. There were protests from religious groups who considered it una ofensa grave y oportunista a los católicos. (Note: English: A serious and opportunistic offense to Catholics) El cos més bonic que s’haurà trobat mai en aquest lloc (The Nicest Body Ever Seen Around These Parts, English translation by Sharon G. Feldman) (2020), tells the story of a young boy found murdered in a field near his village, and the reactions of different characters to his death and his story. Jo, travesti (Me, Trans) (2023) is a reflection on transvestism and transsexuality. Miró also wrote the play Els homes i els dies (Men and Days) (2022), based on the complete narrative work and life of David Vilaseca. Additionally, he published the article La bambalina oculta (The Backstage Closet) for the monographic issue Homosexualitat i teatre (Homosexuality and Theater) in Hamlet magazine (Hamlet magazine, issue #23, February 2012, pages 63–67.)

Nando López has also addressed homosexual relationships in both his narrative and dramatic works. In 2012, he premiered his play Cuando fuimos dos—on the subject of the breakup of a gay couple—at the Sala Triángulo theater in Madrid. The play was revived in 2013 at the Infanta Isabel Theater in Madrid. Moreover, López has also addressed LGTBI themes in plays premiered inside and outside Spain, such as #malditos16 (a candidate for the Premios Max award for best new author), La edad de la ira, Desengaños amorosos (a loose adaptation of the novels of María de Zayas and a candidate for the Premios Max for best adaptation), and Los amores diversos, among others.

In 2005, also at the Sala Triángulo, Juan Carlos Rubio premiered his play Las heridas del viento. It was revived in 2013 at the Lara Theater in Madrid after having been performed in New York and several Latin American countries, with a new cast in which actress Kiti Mánver plays a man. Alejandro Melero is another author who has repeatedly addressed homosexual themes. The revival of his play Climax opened the season at the Alfil Theater in Madrid in 2013, and his Una vida perfecta premiered that same year.

In 2012, Guillem Clua premiered Smiley, a romantic comedy about two gay men, which was later adapted into a television series of the same name. Moreover, his play La golondrina (2017) achieved great international commercial success. The play is framed by the 2016 Pulse nightclub shooting in Orlando. It deals with how the partner of one of the young men killed during the attack outs him to his mother.

In 2014, Alberto Conejero premiered Cliff (Acantilado), a play inspired by the life of actor Montgomery Clift, which had previously premiered in Buenos Aires under the direction of Argentine playwright Alejandro Tantanian. The play won the 2011 Leopoldo Alas Mínguez International Competition for LGTB dramatic literature (better known as LAM). Other works by Conejero that address the subject of homosexuality, in one way or another, are Húngaros and La piedra oscura. The latter explores the relationship between Rafael Rodríguez Rapún and Federico García Lorca. Additional works by Conejero include La geometría del trigo, a play for which he won the National Dramatic Literature Award in 2019, and En mitad de tanto fuego, a monologue that rewrites Homer's Iliad from the point of view of Patroclus and his relationship with Achilles.

In 2018, Luis Miguel Sánchez Mota won the Fray Luis de León Award with Latidos, which addresses the friendship that blossoms between a young man and a middle-aged man who meet while cruising.

Pedro Montalbán Kroebel has also dealt with the subject of homosexuality in some of his plays. In 2004, he premiered La fascinación de Gil-Albert, influenced by the works of Juan Gil-Albert, written on the occasion of the centennial of his birth, and published in 2006. The play presents Gil-Albert himself as the protagonist and includes his reflections on homosexuality published in his essay Heraclés: sobre una manera de ser. Montalbán Kroebel published Paso a dos in 2006, while the play premiered in 2009.

==== Festivals and awards ====
Once a year, between 2005 and 2012 (the last time it was held), the Festival Visible de Cultura LGTB presented a series of events—in which theatrical performances stood out—to coincide with the celebrations of the International LGBT Pride Day in Madrid. In 2007, at the request of Festival Visible director Pablo Peinado and with help from playwright Juan Carlos Rubio to draft the contest rules, Festival Visible and the SGAE Foundation together with Óscar Millares, head of the SGAE theater section, announced the Leopoldo Alas Mínguez International Competition for LGTB dramatic literature (LAM). Winners and finalists have included:

Year	Winner	Play
2007	Mariano Moro	De hombre a hombre
2008	Carmen Losa (honorable mention to Antonio Hernández Centeno for Héroes)	Levante
2009	Nacho de Diego	La playa de los perros destrozados
2010	Alberto Conejero	Clift (Acantilado)
2011	Juan Luis Mira	Beca y Eva dicen que se quieren
2012	Íñigo Guardamino	El año que se rompió mi corazón
2013	Itziar Pascual	Eudy
2014	Alberto de Casso (honorable mention to Jesús Benjamín Farías Rojas, from Venezuela, for Bichito raro)	La tarde muerta
2015	Javier Sahuquillo	Alimento para mastines
2016	Sergio Martínez Vila	El océano contra las rocas
2017	Paco Gámez	El suelo que sostiene a Hande
2018	Iñigo Guardamino	Eloy y el mañana
2019	Marcos Gisbert	La armonía de las esferas
2020	Javier Suárez Lema	Afuera están los perros
2021	Javier de Dios	Una canción italiana
2022	Juan Carlos Mestre and Celia Morán	Vagos y maleantes

=== Essay and academic discussion ===
The journal Orientaciones was published from 2000 to 2006. Through it, philosopher Javier Pérez Ugarte spread information about LGBT+ studies to the point of becoming, according to anthropologist José Ignacio Pichardo Galán, uno de los principales referentes para el pensamiento y la reflexión sobre diversidad sexual en castellano. (Note: English: One of the main go-to academics for information on sexual diversity in the Spanish language)

In 2012, the Associació Col·legial d'Escriptors de Catalunya (ACEC) organized the First Conference on Gay and Lesbian Literature, in which the subject was studied from an academic and creative point of view. In attendance were academics and writers such as Lluís Maria Todó, María Castrejón, Alberto Mira, Eduardo Mendicutti, and Isabel Franc.

In the essay category, the works that were published included: De Sodoma a Chueca: historia cultural de la homosexualidad en España 1914–1990 (Egales, 2004) by Alberto Mira, and El paciente ocasional: Una historia social del sida by Ibon Larrazabal, with a prologue by Rafael Reig (Ediciones Península, 2011).

Alejandro Melero published Placeres ocultos. Gays y lesbianas en el cine español de la Transición (Notorious, 2010), on the reflection of homosexuals in Spanish cinema.

Several books on male prostitution have been published as well: La difícil vida fácil: Doce testimonios sobre prostitución masculina by Iván Zaro, with a prologue by Luis Antonio de Villena (Punto de Vista, 2016), and Chaperos, precariado y prostitución homosexual by Eduardo Lizardo and Oscar Guasch (Bellaterra, 2017).

=== Children's and young adult literature ===
The normalization of these themes in society has also had an impact on children's and young adult literature. Stories that deal with sexual diversity and same-sex families began to be published in 2001. For instance, publishing house Ediciones La Tempestad published that year El príncipe enamorado by Carles Recio, a short story for children in which the protagonist, the son of the King of Valencia, falls in love with his male servant. In 2002, Editorial SM published the young adult novel El beso de Aquiles by Alberto Conejero, in which the protagonist has to confront his own homophobic beliefs. Paula tiene dos mamás by Léslea Newman (Bellaterra) and La princesa Ana by Luisa Guerrero (ONG por la No Discriminación), both children's books with lesbian protagonists, were published in 2003. The latter was adapted to the theater in 2010, a play with which theater company Tarambana won the prize of the campaign ¡Sal a escena contra la discriminación! (Note: English: Take the stage against discrimination!) awarded by the Ministry of Health, Social Policy and Equality.

Moreover, the publication of Nando López's novel La edad de la ira (which he published under the name Fernando J. López) marked a new step forward with regards to narratives that address the reality of LGBT+ youth, as it deals with issues such as school bullying and adolescent homosexuality. Its great success among younger audiences and the teaching community has led to it becoming a classic in classrooms across Spain. The same goes for its theatrical version, written by the author himself and staged by theater company La Joven.

When López was awarded the 2020 Premio Gran Angular award by the Fundación SM for the young adult novel La versión de Eric, which has a trans protagonist, it marked a new milestone in children's and young adult literature with LGTB characters and themes. Other works by this author that have enjoyed great success among young audiences and in which various orientations and identities play a leading role include: Nadie nos oye, En las redes del miedo, and El reino de los Tres Soles.

El fuego en el que ardo by Sevillian author and literary translator Mike Lightwood was published in 2016 and its companion novel El hielo de mis venas, a year later, both by publishing house Plataforma Neo. Both deal with the issues of homophobic school bullying, acceptance, first romances, and first sexual encounters between boys. A spin-off novel, La estrella de mis noches, about the romance between two boys who meet again after several years, was published later. Lightwood also published the futuristic science fiction novel Biónico, in which most of the characters are LGBT+.

== Publishing world, awards, and specialized bookstores ==
In 2014, as part of the events surrounding Madrid Pride, the First LGTBQ Book Fair was held on the Calle de Augusto Figueroa street in Madrid, with the presence of writers and specialized publishing houses.

=== Publishing houses ===
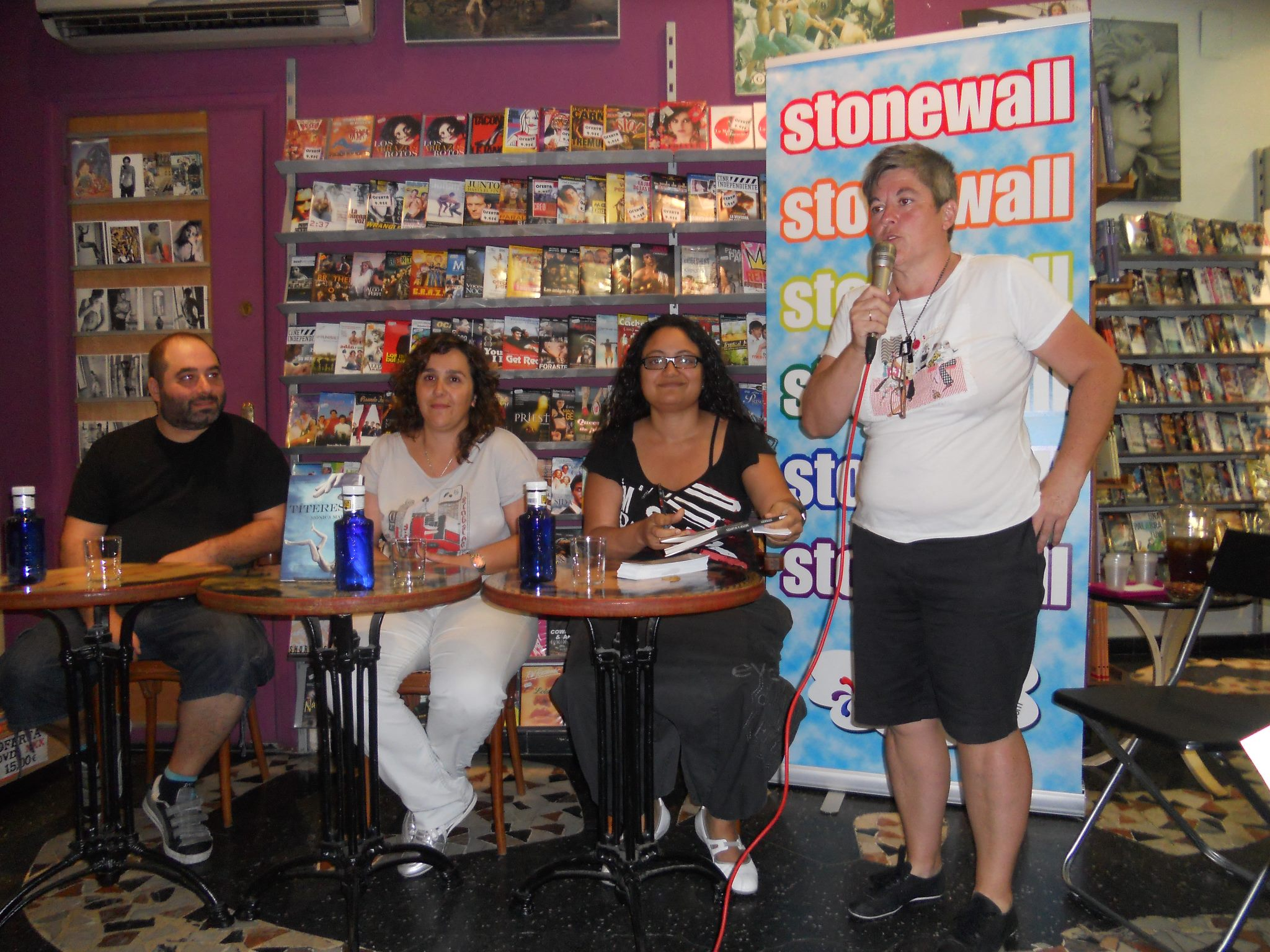
Presenting a book by publishing house Stonewall at the Berkana bookstore in Madrid (September 2011). From left to right: Diego Manuel Béjar, Mónica Martín, Mariel Maciá, and Mili Hernández.

The first publishing house in Spain to publish LGBT+ literature on a regular basis was Editorial Laertes in Barcelona. In 1985, it created the Rey de Bastos collection, managed by Alberto Cardín until his death, and which dealt exclusively with this genre. (Note: English: Rey de Bastos is the oldest collection on literature and essays related to the homosexual and queer universe in Spain. Originally managed by the late Alberto Cardín, this historic collection has reviewed the attitudes towards homosexuality in all its variants for more than 25 years.) Later, in the 1990s, several specialized publishing houses began to appear, including Egales in 1995 and Odisea in 1999.

In the 21st century, the following houses were also founded: Stonewall (2011), Dos Bigotes (2014), La Calle (2014), and Amistades Particulares (2014). The latter is a small independent publishing house dedicated to the recovery of LGBT+ works from the late 19th and early 20th centuries. In addition, independent house Baphala Ediciones was founded in 2016. It specializes in postcolonial LGTBIA literature.

=== Literary awards ===
From 1999 to 2013, publishing house Odisea awarded the Premio Odisea award to books dealing with gay and lesbian themes published in Spanish. In 2005, non-profit foundation Arena began awarding the Terenci Moix prize for gay and lesbian narrative. In 2012, its name was changed to Premio Fundación Arena de Narrativa GLBTQ. Since 2011, publishing house Stonewall has been awarding the Premio Stonewall prize for LGBT+ literature.

=== Bookstores ===
There are several LGBT+ bookstores in various Spanish cities, such as Berkana and A different Life in Madrid, Cómplices and Antinous in Barcelona, and Safo de Lesbos in Bilbao.

== See also ==
- Spanish literature
- LGBT literature in Argentina
- LGBT literature in Colombia
- LGBT literature in Ecuador
- LGBT literature in El Salvador
- LGBT literature in Mexico
- Bengali Queer Literature

== Bibliography ==
- Akaloo, Nasima Nisha (May 2012). "Vigilando las fronteras de la identidad española". Cruzando fronteras: imágenes literarias de la migración marroquí a España. Una lectura comparatista (PhD thesis) (in Spanish). Getafe, Spain: Charles III University of Madrid.
- Aliaga, Juan Vicente (2001). Miradas sobre la sexualidad en el arte y la literatura del siglo XX en Francia y España (in Spanish). Valencia, Spain: University of Valencia. ISBN 9788437045726.
- Belda, Joaquín (1918). La diosa razón (in Spanish). Madrid: Biblioteca Hispania.
- Bruquetas de Castro, Fernando (2000). "Outing en prensa, literatura y arte". Outing en España: los español@s salen del armario (in Spanish). Madrid: Editorial Hijos de Muley Rubio (HMR). pp. 125–140. ISBN 8492343362.
- Burgos, Tino (June 2016). "La aparición del sujeto invertido en el primer tercio del siglo XX". Viento Sur (in Spanish). xxiv (146). Madrid: 48–54.
- Cantera Espinosa, Leonor M. (2004). Más allá del género. Nuevos enfoques de "nuevas" dimensiones y direcciones de la violencia en la pareja (PDF) (PhD thesis) (in Spanish). Autonomous University of Barcelona.
- Cleminson, Richard; Vásquez García, Francisco (2007). "Los Invisibles". A History of Male Homosexuality in Spain, 1850–1939. Cardiff, Wales: University of Wales Press. ISBN 9780708324691.
- Correa Ramón, Amelina (September–December 2012). "Isaac Muñoz (1881-1925) o un catálogo de la disidencia para los estetas del decadentismo". Revista Internacional d'Humanitats (in Spanish). xv (26). Autonomous University of Barcelona: 37–64. ISSN 1516-5485.
- Crompton, Louis (1997). "Male Love and Islamic Law in Arab Spain". In Murray, Stephen O.; Roscoe, Will (eds.). Islamic Homosexualities: Culture, History, and Literature. New York, New York: New York University Press. pp. 142–160. ISBN 9788489678606.
- de Villena, Luis Antonio (1999). El ángel de la frivolidad y su máscara oscura (vida, literatura y tiempo de Álvaro Retana) (in Spanish) (1st ed.). Valencia, Spain: Editorial Pre-Textos. ISBN 84-8191-241-7.
- de Villena, Luis Antonio, ed. (2002). Amores iguales. Antología de la poesía gay y lésbica: panorama general (in Spanish) (1st ed.). Madrid: La Esfera de los Libros. ISBN 84-9734-061-2.
- del Moral, Celia (1998). "Contribución a la historia de la mujer a partir de las fuentes literarias andalusíes". In Izquierdo Benito, Ricardo; Sáenz Badillos, Ángel (eds.). La sociedad medieval a través de la literatura hispanojudía: VI Curso de Cultura Hispano-Judía y Sefardí de la Universidad de Castilla-La Mancha (in Spanish). Ciudad Real, Spain: University of Castilla–La Mancha. pp. 101–122. ISBN 9788489492967.
- Díaz Marcos, Ana María (December 2014 – May 2015). "Masculinidades disidentes: el tercer sexo en las novelas de Álvaro Retana". Prisma Social (in Spanish) (13). Madrid: Fundación iS+D para la Investigación Social Avanzada: 00–32. ISSN 1989-3469.
- Domínguez, Carmen (2000). La subversión del discurso autoritario en la narrativa de Cristina Peri Rossi (in Spanish). University Press of the South. ISBN 1-889431-74-5.
- Eisenberg, Daniel; Cerezo, José Antonio; Infantes, Víctor, eds. (1996). "El Buen Amor heterosexual de Juan Ruiz". Los territorios literarios de la historia del placer. Madrid: Huerga y Fierro Editores. pp. 49–70. ISBN 84-89678-60-X.
- Eisenberg, Daniel (1999). "Introduction". In Foster, David William (ed.). Spanish Writers on Gay and Lesbian Themes. A Bio-Critical Sourcebook. Westport, Connecticut, United States: Greenwood Publishing Group. pp. 1–21. ISBN 0313303320.
- Ellis, Robert Richmond (2007). "La autobiografía travestida: la función del eros en "Patty Diphusa y otros textos" de Pedro Almodóvar". In Díez Fernández, José Ignacio; Martín, Adrienne Laskier (eds.). Venus venerada II. Literatura erótica y modernidad en España (in Spanish). Madrid: Editorial Complutense. pp. 211–228. ISBN 978-84-7491-839-7.
- Escámez Jiménez, Óscar (2001). "La homosexualidad masculina en la narrativa hispánica durante los años noventa". In Aliaga, Juan Vicente; Haderbache, Amhed; Monleón Domínguez, Ana; Pujante González, Domingo (eds.). Miradas sobre la sexualidad en el arte y en la literatura del siglo XX en Francia y en España (in Spanish). Valencia, Spain: University of Valencia. pp. 413–425. ISBN 84-370-4572-X.
- Fernàndez, Josep-Anton (2000). Another Country: Sexuality and National Identity in Catalan Gay Fiction. London: Modern Humanities Research Association. ISBN 978-1-902653-26-6.
- Fuentes Hinojo, Pablo (November 2003). "Apios, bufos y sapísimos. La identidad homosexual en la literatura española (1874-1936)". Claves de Razón Práctica (in Spanish) (137). PRISA: 62–69. ISSN 1130-3689.
- García, Ariadna G. (2006). Antología de la poesía española (1939–1975) (in Spanish). Madrid: Ediciones Akal. ISBN 84-460-2021-1.
- Gullón, Germán (2004). "La novela española: 1980–2003". In Orejudo, Antonio (ed.). En cuarentena: nuevos narradores y críticos a principios del siglo XXI (in Spanish). Murcia, Spain: EDITUM Ediciones de la Universidad de Murcia. pp. 15–38. ISBN 9788483714584.
- Huércanos Esparza, Íñigo (2022). "Almodóvar contra el hombre de letras de la transición: la parodia del mal escritor en ¿Qué he hecho yo para merecer esto!". Hispanófila (in Spanish). 195 (195). Chapel Hill, North Carolina, United States: University of North Carolina at Chapel Hill: 77–92. doi:10.1353/hsf.2022.0025. ISSN 0018-2206.
- Ingenschay, Dieter (2000). "8. Identidad homosexual y procesamiento del franquismo en el discurso literario de España desde la Transición". In Resina, Joan Ramon (ed.). Disremembering the Dictatorship: The Politics of Memory in the Spanish Transition to Democracy (in Spanish). Amsterdam: Rodopi. pp. 157–190. ISBN 9789042013520.
- Jerónimo, Heather; Todó, Lluís Maria (2013). "Entrevista: "En Cataluña hay una gran tradición de respeto a la diferencia." Conversación con el escritor Lluís Maria Todó". Arizona Journal of Hispanic Cultural Studies (in Spanish). 17. University of Arizona: 121–135. ISSN 1096-2492. JSTOR 24582271.
- Kowal, Donna M. (2019). "Anarcha-Feminism". In Adams, Matthew S.; Levy, Carl (eds.). The Palgrave Handbook of Anarchism. London: Palgrave Macmillan. pp. 265–280. doi:10.1007/978-3-319-75620-2_15. ISBN 978-3319756196. S2CID 242073896.
- Labanyi, Jo (1999). "Narrative in culture, 1975–1996". In Gies, David Thatcher (ed.). The Cambridge Companion to Modern Spanish Culture. Cambridge, United Kingdom: Cambridge University Press. pp. 147–162. ISBN 9780521574297.
- Larralde, Gabriela (2014). Los mundos posibles. Un estudio sobre la literatura LGBTTTI para niñxs (in Spanish). Buenos Aires: Título/Recursos Editoriales. ISBN 978-987-26395-8-7.
- Maestre-Brotons, Antoni (2018). "L'estranya identitat : l'alteritat sexual en «L'aprenentatge de la soledat», de David Vilaseca (2008)". Caplletra: Revista internacional de filología (in Catalan) (65). Valencia, Spain: Interuniversity Institute of Valencian Philology: 203–231. doi:10.7203/caplletra.65.12620. hdl:10550/68707. ISSN 0214-8188.
- Mangini González, Shirley (1996). "Las vanguardias y el discurso del deseo". In Zavala Zapata, Iris M.; Díaz Diocaretz, Myriam (eds.). Vol. 3. La mujer en la literatura española: modos de representación desde el siglo XVIII a la actualidad. Breve historia feminista de la literatura española (en lengua castellana) (in Spanish). Barcelona: Anthropos Editorial. pp. 177–212. ISBN 84-7658-484-9.
- Martínez Expósito, Alfredo, ed. (1999–2000). "Gay and Lesbian Writing in the Hispanic World". Antípodas, Journal of Hispanic and Galician Studies (in Spanish) (xi–xii). Auckland, New Zealand: University of Auckland. ISSN 0113-2415. OCLC 45019281.
- Martínez Expósito, Alfredo (2011). "La literatura gay española y el lugar de los estudios culturales" (PDF). Lectora: Revista de dones i textualitat (in Spanish) (17). Barcelona: Autonomous University of Barcelona: 25–40. ISSN 1136-5781.
- Martínez Rubio, José (23 December 2021). "La generación gay del 27. Literatura homosexual en el debate de la Modernidad de principios de siglo XX" (PDF). Archivum (in Spanish). 71 (71). Oviedo, Spain: University of Oviedo: 279–310. doi:10.17811/arc.71.1.2021.
- Martínez Vergel, Joan (2005). Gái, ¿el quinto poder? Protagonismo e influencia de los homosexuales en la sociedad española (in Spanish). Barcelona: Editorial Volter. ISBN 9788493384937.
- Menchero, Juan (2006). "A.M.D.G. La politización de un estreno teatral". Acotaciones: Revista de investigación teatral (in Spanish) (17). Madrid: Editorial Fundamentos: 85–100. ISSN 1130-7269.
- Mendicutti, Eduardo (September 2002). "Libros que entienden. Hacia un canon de la literatura gay". Qué Leer (in Spanish). Barcelona: Comunicación y Publicaciones. pp. 28–32. ISSN 1136-3916.
- Mira Nouselles, Alberto (1999). Para entendernos: diccionario de cultura homosexual, gay y lésbica (in Spanish). Barcelona: Ediciones La Tempestad. ISBN 84-7948-038-6.
- Mora, Ricardo (2009). "Calas en la narrativa erótica actual en España". Fábula, revista literaria (in Spanish) (27). Asociación Riojana de Lectores, Escritores y Artistas (ARLEA): 64–70. ISSN 1698-2800.
- Palma Borrego, María José (2006). "Un recorrido por la novela lesbiana española". In Balutet, Nicolas (ed.). Ars homoerótica: escribir la homosexualidad en las letras hispánicas (in Spanish). Paris: Publibook. pp. 15–19. ISBN 9782748331899.
- Peña Ardid, Carmen (1988). "Amor y homosexualidad en Juan Gil-Albert" (PDF). Cuadernos de investigación filológica (in Spanish). 14 (14). Logroño, Spain: University of La Rioja: 21–39. doi:10.18172/cif.vol14. ISSN 0211-0547.
- Perriam, Chris (2002). "Not Writing Straight, but Not Writing Queer: Popular Castilian 'Gay' Fiction". In Labanyi, Jo (ed.). Constructing Identity in Contemporary Spain: Theoretical Debates and Cultural Practice. Oxford, United Kingdom: Oxford University Press. pp. 154–170. ISBN 9780198159933.
- Pertusa, Inmaculada (2015). "Del negro al rojo: la erotización de la novela detectivesca lesbiana (española) en El primer caso de Cate Maynes de Clara Asunción García". In Losada Soler, Elena; Paszkiewicz, Katarzyna (eds.). Tras la pista. Narrativa criminal escrita por mujeres (in Spanish). Barcelona: Icaria Editorial. pp. 97–112. ISBN 9788498886566.
- Pichardo, José Ignacio (September 2007). "Homo academicus". Zero (in Spanish) (100). ISSN 1575-0566.
- Pino, Luis Daniel, ed. (2011). Blanco nuclear. Antología de poesía gay y lésbica última (in Spanish). Madrid: Sial/Contrapunto. ISBN 9788415014690.
- Puertas Moya, Francisco Ernesto (March 2009). El diván del Tamarit: recreación poética del mundo árabe por Federico García Lorca. I Taller de Literaturas Hispánicas y ELE (in Spanish). Oran, Algeria: Instituto Cervantes. pp. 27–36.
- Rodríguez-Gaona, Martín (2011). Mejorando lo presente. Poesía española última: posmodernidad, humanismo y redes (in Spanish). Madrid: Caballo de Troya. ISBN 9788496594579.
- Saxe, Facundo Nazareno (October 2011). La resignificación queer de los espacios normativos en la obra de Eduardo Mendicutti: El caso de Yo no tengo la culpa de haber nacido tan sexy (PDF). II Congreso Internacional de Literatura y Cultura Españolas Contemporáneas (in Spanish). La Plata, Argentina: National University of La Plata.
- Saxe, Facundo Nazareno (2014). "¿La normalización de lo queer? El matrimonio entre personas del mismo sexo en Contra natura de Álvaro Pombo y California de Eduardo Mendicutti". Texturas. Estudios Interdisciplinarios Sobre el Discurso (in Spanish) (13). Buenos Aires: National University of La Plata: 135–142. doi:10.14409/texturas.v1i13.4388. hdl:11336/5953. ISSN 1666-8367.
- Valls Guzmán, Fernando (2011). "Sobre el cuento español actual y algunos nuevos nombres". In Champeau, Geneviève; Carcelén, Jean-Fraçois; Tyras, Georges (eds.). Nuevos derroteros de la narrativa española actual. Veinte años de creación (in Spanish). Zaragoza: University of Zaragoza. pp. 129–162. ISBN 978-84-15-27423-0.
- Various authors (2012). Femme et Littérature Populaire (in Catalan). Edicions i Publicacions de la Universitat de Lleida. ISBN 9788484095743.
- Vila Núñez, Fefa; Sáez del Álamo, Javier, eds. (2019). El libro de buen amor. Sexualidades raras y políticas extrañas (in Spanish). Madrid: City Council of Madrid. ISBN 978-84-7812-816-7.
- Víllora, Pedro M. (2003). "Prologue". Mendizábal, escrito para gustar (in Spanish). Madrid: Centro Cultural de la Villa de Madrid. ISBN 84-88406-53-3.
- Woods, Gregory (1998). A History of Gay Literature: The Male Tradition. New Haven, Connecticut, United States: Yale University Press. ISBN 9780300072013.
- Woods, Jordan Blair (2015). "The Birth of Modern Criminology and Gendered Constructions of Homosexual Criminal Identity". Journal of Homosexuality. 62 (2). Taylor & Francis: 131–166. doi:10.1080/00918369.2014.969053. ISSN 1540-3602. PMID 25265480.
