= Carmen Moreno =

Carmen Moreno may refer to:

- Carmen Moreno Pérez, Spanish writer and editor
- Carmen Moreno Raymundo, Spanish diplomat
- Carmen Moreno (singer) (1926–2025), Polish jazz singer
- Carmen Moreno Toscano (born 1938), Mexican diplomat, Permanent Mission of Mexico to the Organization of American States
