= Pablo García Baena =

Spanish poet (1921–2018)

- Born: Pablo García Baena; 29 June 1921; Córdoba, Spain
- Died: 14 January 2018 (aged 96); Córdoba, Spain
- Occupation: Poet
- Writing career
- Language: Spanish
- Notable awards: Prince of Asturias Award for Literature; 1984

Pablo García Baena (Spanish pronunciation: [ˈpaβlo ɣaɾˈθia βaˈena]; 29 June 1921 – 14 January 2018) was a Spanish poet. He was born and raised in Córdoba. In 1947, he formed a literary/artistic group called Cántico with his friends and fellow-writers Ricardo Molina, Juan Bernier, Julio Aumente and Mario López. Also in the group were the painters Miguel del Moral and Ginés Liébana.

García Baena published more than a dozen collections of poetry, receiving widespread critical acclaim. He was awarded the prestigious Asturias Prize in 1984. He has received numerous other honours, including "Favoured Son" status from his hometown of Córdoba and his native region of Andalusia. Since the 1960s, he has lived in Málaga province. He contributed regularly to Spanish newspapers and journals and lectured widely.

== Works ==
=== Poetry ===
- "Rumor oculto" (Madrid, 1946)
- "Mientras canten los pájaros" (Córdoba, 1948)
- "Antiguo muchacho" (Madrid, 1950)
- "Junio" (Málaga, 1957)
- "Óleo" (Madrid, 1958)
- "Almoneda" (Málaga, 1971)
- "Antes que el tiempo acabe" (Madrid, 1979)
- "Gozos para la Navidad de Vicente Núñez" (Madrid, 1984)
- "Antología poética" (Bujalance, Córdoba, 1959)
- "Poemas" (Málaga, 1975)
- "Poesía completa" (Madrid, 1982)
- "El sur de Pablo García Baena" (Córdoba, 1988)
- "Antología última" (Málaga, 1989).
- "Fieles guirnaldas fugitivas" (winner of the "City of Melilla" International Poetry Award)

=== Prose ===
- "Lectivo" (Jerez de la Frontera, 1983)
- "El retablo de las cofradías" (Córdoba, 1985)
