= Jo Labanyi =

Professor of Spanish

Jo Labanyi FBA (born 1946) is professor emerita of Spanish at New York University. She specialises in the study of Spanish literature and culture of the 19th and 20th centuries.

== Biography ==
Labanyi studied for her undergraduate degree at Oxford University, graduating with a BA in Spanish in 1967. She was director of the Institute of Romance Studies at the University of London from 1997 to 2002. She was Professor of Spanish and Cultural Studies at the University of Southampton from 2001 to 2006 before moving to New York University in 2006.

Labanyi was the founding editor of the Journal of Spanish Cultural Studies. She is on the executive committee of The Abraham Lincoln Brigade Archives.

Labanyi was elected as a Fellow of the British Academy in 2005.

== Select publications ==
- Labanyi, J. 1989. Myth and history in the contemporary Spanish novel. Cambridge University Press.
- Labanyi, J. 1995. Culture and gender in nineteenth-century Spain. Oxford University Press.
- Labanyi, J. 2000. Gender and modernization in the Spanish realist novel. Oxford University Press.
- Labanyi, J. 2010. Spanish literature : a very short introduction.
- Labanyi, J. 2012. A companion to Spanish Cinema
