= Carmen Moreno Pérez =

Spanish writer

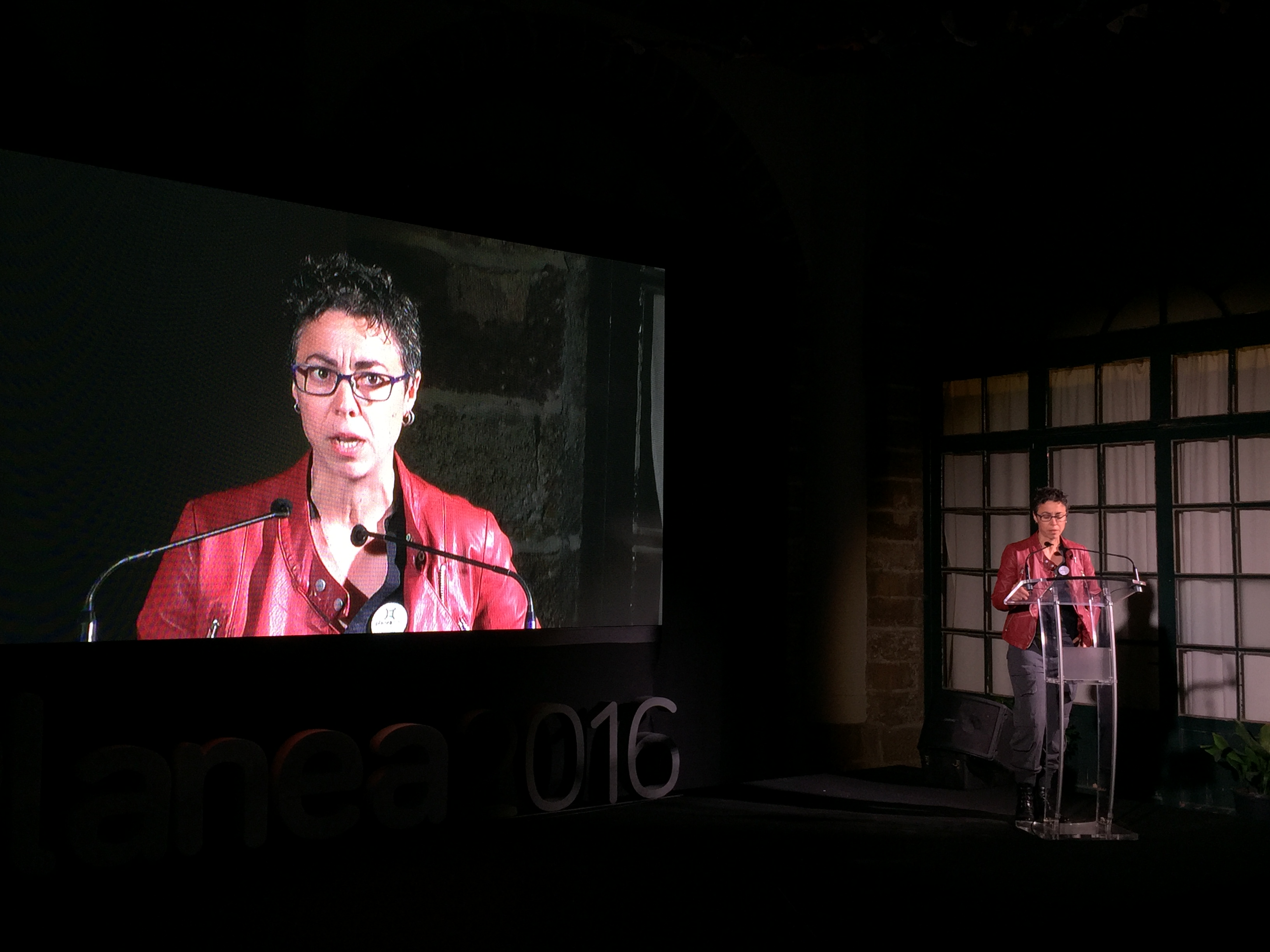
- Carmen Moreno in 2016
- Citizenship: Spanish
- Education: University of Cádiz; University of Salamanca
- Occupations: Writer; politician; poet; editor
- Office: Substitute member of the Parliamentary Assembly of the Council of Europe (1993–1995)

Carmen Moreno Pérez is a Spanish writer and editor. She writes about women's rights and the LGBTQIA+ community. In her poetry collection Más que morir (Madrid, 2006), she tackles the issue of violence against women through her narrative.

== Biography ==
Moreno holds a bachelor's degree in Hispanic Philology from the University of Cádiz and a master's degree in accounting and finance from CEREM International Business School. She also holds a master's degree in publishing from the University of Salamanca.

In 1996, she worked with author Fernando Quiñones on his books Las crónicas yugoslavas and Y al Sur, Jimena. Also around that time, she collaborated in several anthologies, and worked for newspaper Diario de Cádiz and radio network Cadena SER. In 2006, she moved to Madrid, where she worked as a cultural technical advisor for the Ministry of Equality and as a proofreader and copyeditor for publishing groups Fondo de Cultura Económica (Spain) and Hotel Papel. In 2009, she worked part-time as a scriptwriter for Televisión Española's quiz show Cifras y letras. Between 2009 and 2010, she worked as technical cultural advisor for the Institute of Youth (INJUVE) in Madrid and as a contributor to cultural review magazine Revista de Letras.

In 2011, she launched Colaterales, a citizens' platform to promote reading and the arts in Cádiz. It was headquartered at the Pay Pay cultural center. In 2014, she returned to Cádiz, where she began her career in publishing at the helm of imprint Cazador de Ratas (later renamed as Cazador). With this imprint, in 2017 she received the Ultratumba award for her venture into the horror and gothic genres.

She has also participated in various events by the Cádiz City Council and the Cádiz Provincial Council to promote reading and writing. With this institution, she toured the entire province with the exhibition El club de las poetas muertas. She also collaborates regularly with the Andalusian Center of Letters (Centro Andaluz de las Letras; CAL) in programs such as PoetiCAL.

In 2018 she opened a bookstore specialising in feminist and LGBTQ+ literature.

== Awards ==
- Fernando Quiñones National Prize for Short Story (2001)
- Andalucía Joven Award for Art (2002)
- Pilar Paz Pasamar National Prize for Short Story (2004)
- National "Memorial Juan José Maroto" Award for Bullfighting Poetry (2004)
- International Poetry Prize of the Order of Quevedo (2009)

== List of works ==
The following is a non-exhaustive list of Moreno's works.

=== Short stories and essays ===
- Tocando el cielo (Ediciones I. Quorum, Cádiz, 2002)
- El temor inevitable (Ediciones En Huida, Sevilla, 2015)
- De lo urbano y lo divino (eMeGé Editores, Algeciras, 2016)
- Sin habitación propia (essay) (Fundación Novoneyra, Santiago de Compostela, 2016)

=== Poetry ===
- Plano urbano (Ediciones I. Quorum, Cádiz, 1996)
- Sombra mía (Sevilla, 2000)
- La tregua de la piel (Diputación de Cádiz, Cádiz, 2004)
- Asfalto bíblico (Aristas de Cobre, Córdoba, 2002)
- Más que morir (Madrid, 2006)
- Como el agua a tu cuerpo (Vitruvio, Madrid, 2009)
- Cuando dios se equivoca (EH Editores, Jerez de la Frontera, 2010)
- Moscú entre clavículas (Madrid, 2012)
- Relámpagos (LVR, Madrid, 2013)
- Irremediablemente. Deconstrucción (Ediciones En Huida, Sevilla, 2014)

=== Children's books ===
- Los ojos de Sara (Editorial Conexión Gráfica, Mexico, 2011)
- Hypatia. La contadora de estrellas (Editorial Conexión Gráfica, Mexico, 2011)

=== Illustrated stories ===
- Lightning P38 (Centro de Arte Moderno, Madrid, 2012)

=== Novels ===
- Principito debe morir (Sportula, Gijón, 2013)
- Principito debe morir (reprint) (Lapsus Calami, Madrid, 2013)
- Una última cuestión (Cazador de Ratas, Cádiz, 2015)
- Sherlock Holmes y las sombras de Whitechapel (Licenciado Vidriera, 2016)
- Mala sangre (Apache, 2017)

=== Comics ===
- Principito debe morir (comic adaptation) (Universo cómic, 2016)

=== Anthologies ===
- Antología poética de César Vallejo (Vitruvio, 2010)
- Mujeres que aman a mujeres (Vitruvio, 2012)
- Salitre 15. Nueva poesía gaditana (Ediciones En Huida, 2015)

=== Anthologies featuring Moreno ===
- 11 inicial. Última poesía en Cádiz (Cádiz, 2002)
- La mirada íntima (Jerez, 2003)
- Ilimitada voz. Antología de poetas españolas 1940-2002 (Cádiz, 2003)
- Reinas de Tarifa. Antología de poetas gaditanas actuales (Huelva, 2004)
- El placer de la escritura o Nuevo Retablo de Maese Pedro (Cádiz, 2005)
- Aquí y Ahora (Madrid, 2008)
- Y para qué + poetas (Centro Andaluz de las Letras, Sevilla, 2010)
- Blanco nuclear (Sial, Madrid, 2011)
- Lunta (short story anthology written in Finland, 2012)
- Nube (Ediciones Enhuida, Sevilla, 2013)
- 13 Puñaladas (Cádiz, Dosmil Locos, 2013)
- Más allá de Némesis (Sportula, Gijón, 2013)
- Aventureros (Montevideo, 2015)
- Historia de Mujeres (MAR Editorial, Madrid, 2015)
- Lecciones de asesinos expertos (La Esfera Cultural, 2016)
- Onírica. Hijos de Iquelo (James Crawford Publishing, 2016)

=== Collaborations with other authors ===
- Quiñones, Fernando (1996). Y al Sur, Jimena (in Spanish). Ediciones OBA. ISBN 9788492122011.
- Quiñones, Fernando (1997). Las crónicas yugoslavas (in Spanish). Editorial Renacimiento. ISBN 9788489371217.

== See also ==
- LGBT literature in Spain
