= Alberto Nin Frías =

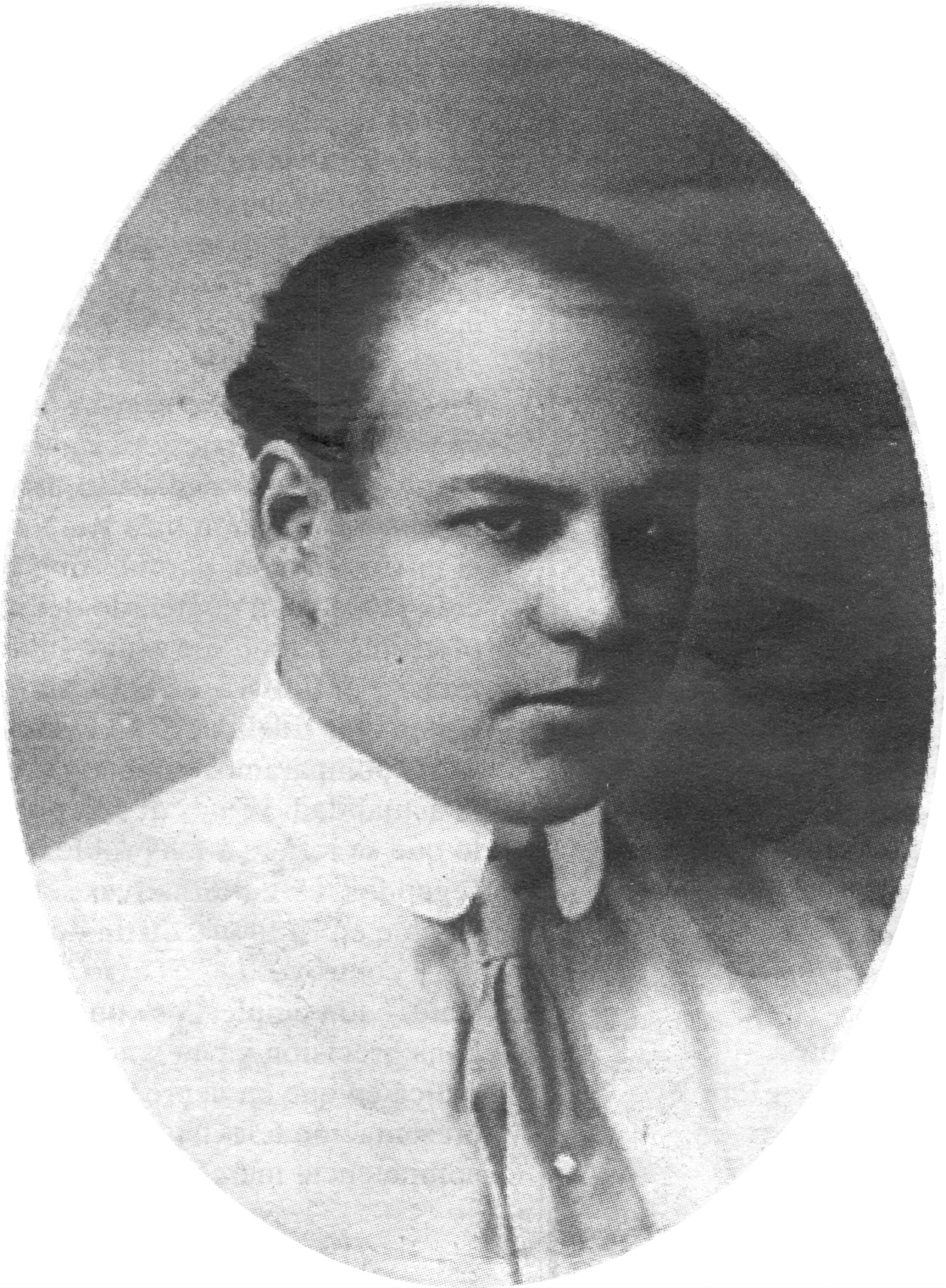
Frias around 1900

Alberto Nin Frías (Montevideo, 9 November 1878 – Suardi, Santa Fe, Argentina, 27 March 1937) was a Uruguayan writer, lecturer and journalist. Among other topics, he is noted for his work on homoeroticism.

Nin Frias also served as a diplomat for Uruguay in the United States, Brazil, Chile and Argentina.

== Biography ==
Alberto Nin Frias was born on 9 of November 1878 in Montevideo. His parents were Dr. Alberto Nin (1853—1919), a member of the Supreme Court of Uruguay and diplomat, and his wife Matilde Frías Nin.

As his father was a diplomat, Nin Frias spent most of his childhood abroad. At age eight, his family was living in London. They later moved to Brussels and Bern.

In 1898, Nin Frias returned to Montevideo. He would work there as a writer, teacher, librarian, and journalist.

Years later, Nin Frias became a diplomat, serving in Washington D.C, Rio de Janeiro, Santiago de Chile, (where he became friends with Gabriela Mistral), and Buenos Aires.

On 27 March 1937, Nin Frias died in poverty in Suardi, Argentina under the protection of the priest Pedro Badanelli.

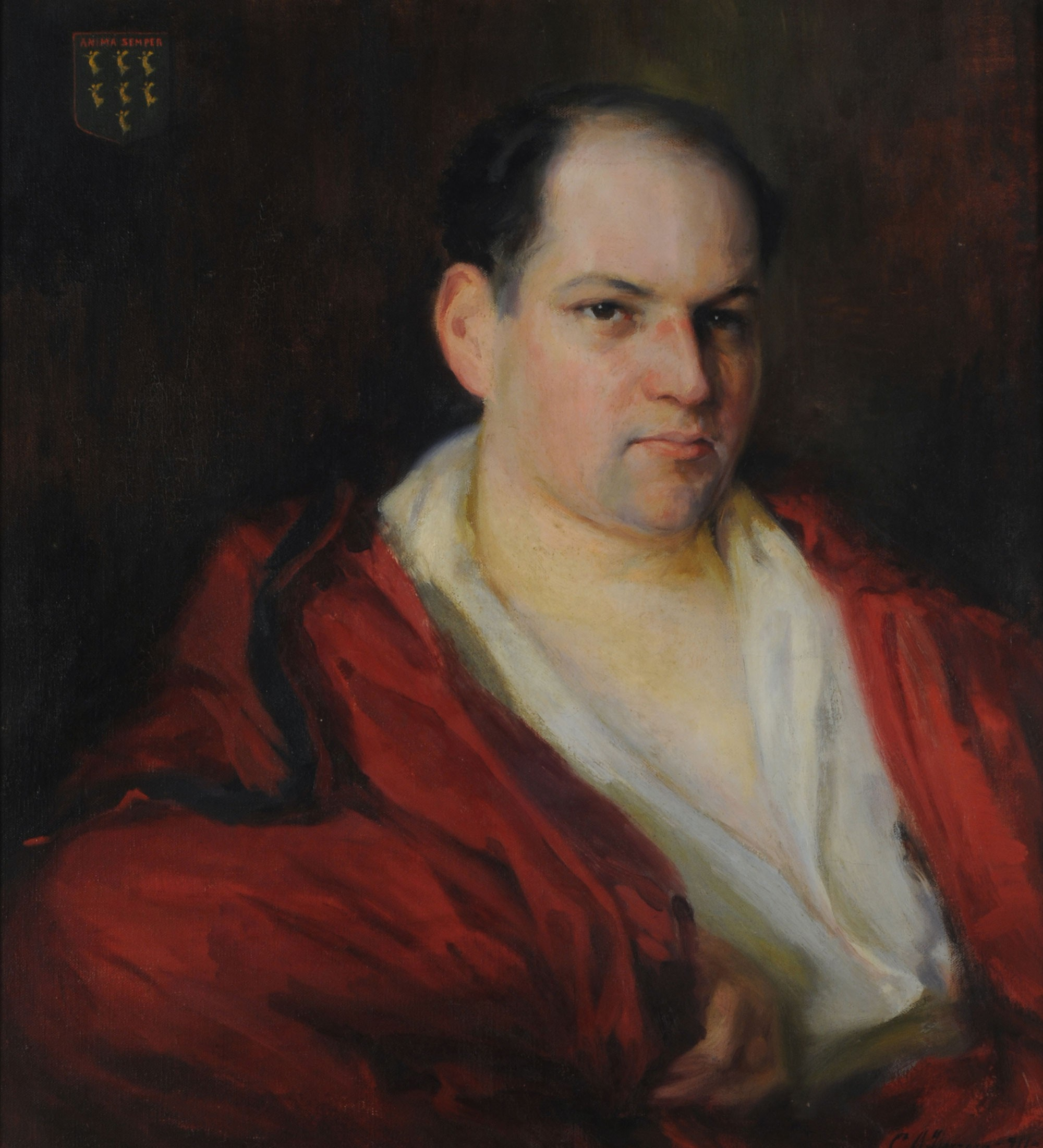
Retrato de Alberto Nin Frias by Carlos María Herrera

== Literary work ==
His literary work deals with topics as varied as English literature, the tree, religion, Greece, customs and eroticism. His book "Created Homosexualism" and Alexis or the meaning of the homosexual temperament (the real title of the book is Alexis or the meaning of the Uranus temperament. 1932, Madrid: Morata) are his most widespread works.

== Selected works ==
- Ensayos de crítica e historia (two volumes, 1904, 1906)
- El cristianismo del punto de mira intellectual (1908)
- Estudios religiosos (1909)
- Carta a un amigo escéptico (1910)
- El árbol (1910)
- La fuente envenenada (1911)
- La novela del renacimiento y otros relatos (1911)
- Sordello Andrea (Novela de la vida interior) (1912)
- Marcos, amador de la belleza (1913)
- Como me allegué a Cristo (1917)
- Un huerto de manzanos (1919)
- El carácter inglés y la novela (1924)
- Alexis o el significado del temperamento urano (1932). Madrid: Morata
- Homosexualismo creador (1933). Madrid: Morata
- El culto al árbol (1933)
- Tres expressiones del espíritu andaluz (1935)
- Alexis o el significado del temperamento homosexual (1933, re-edition 1935)

== Current interest in his work ==
His life and his literary work, particularly related to homoeroticism, has begun to be the object of study and analysis, being referenced in works such as

- Histories of Private Life in Uruguay by Hugo Achugar, published in 1998
- Amor y transgresión by José Pedro Barrán, published in 2001
- La degeneración del 900 by Carla Giaudrone, published in 2005
- Diary of a dying democrat, fictional work by Fernando Loustaunau, published in 2006,
- A study on his friendship and correspondence with Gabriela Mistral, edited in 2017 by Elizabeth Horan.

== Bibliography ==
- Assandri, José; Brecha, January 4, 2008 edition, pp. 22 and 23. Available online at
- Apolant, Juan Alejandro; in "Genesis of the Uruguayan family. The inhabitants of Montevideo in their first 40 years, filiations, ancestry, connections, descendants" (vol. 3, ed. Librería Adolfo Linardi, year 1975).
- García Rodríguez, José Carlos; in "Pedro Badanelli, the Spanish cassock of Perón", ed. Akrón, Astorga, 2008, pp. 64 to 68.
- García Rodríguez, José Carlos; en "Badanelli, albacea literario de Nin Frías" (Capítulo III de Pedro Badanelli, el presbítero de Perón) epub, RD Editores, Sevilla, 2014. ISBN 9788415658559.
- Goldaracena, Ricardo; en "El libro de los linajes. Familias históricas uruguayas del siglo XIX" (vol. 5, ed. Arca, año 2002).
- Hugh, Hagius y Marta Pesce de Bargellini; en "Alberto Nin Frías. Vida y Obras" (año 2009).
- Horan Elizabeth. "On the trees and the screen. Viril Friendship through Alberto Nin Frías and Gabriela Mistral" (year 2017).
- Institute of Genealogical Studies of Uruguay in "Revista del [...]" (No. 13-17, ed. The Institute, year 1991).
- Nin Gastón A.; In "Federico Nin Reyes and the genesis of the meat-packing industry. Regarding an erroneous historical statement by Dr. Ramón J. Cárcano" (ed. C. García, 352 pp., year 1919).
