= Luisgé Martín =

Spanish writer

Luis García Martín (born 1962), known as Luisgé Martín, is a Spanish writer. He was born and raised in Madrid, and attended Complutense University. Influenced by Borges and Cortazar, he published his first book of stories in 1989. He has since written more than a dozen works of fiction and non-fiction. His most recent novel Cien noches won the Premio Herralde de Novela in 2020.

He has written for magazines such as Shangay and Mirlo.
