= Mariel Maciá =

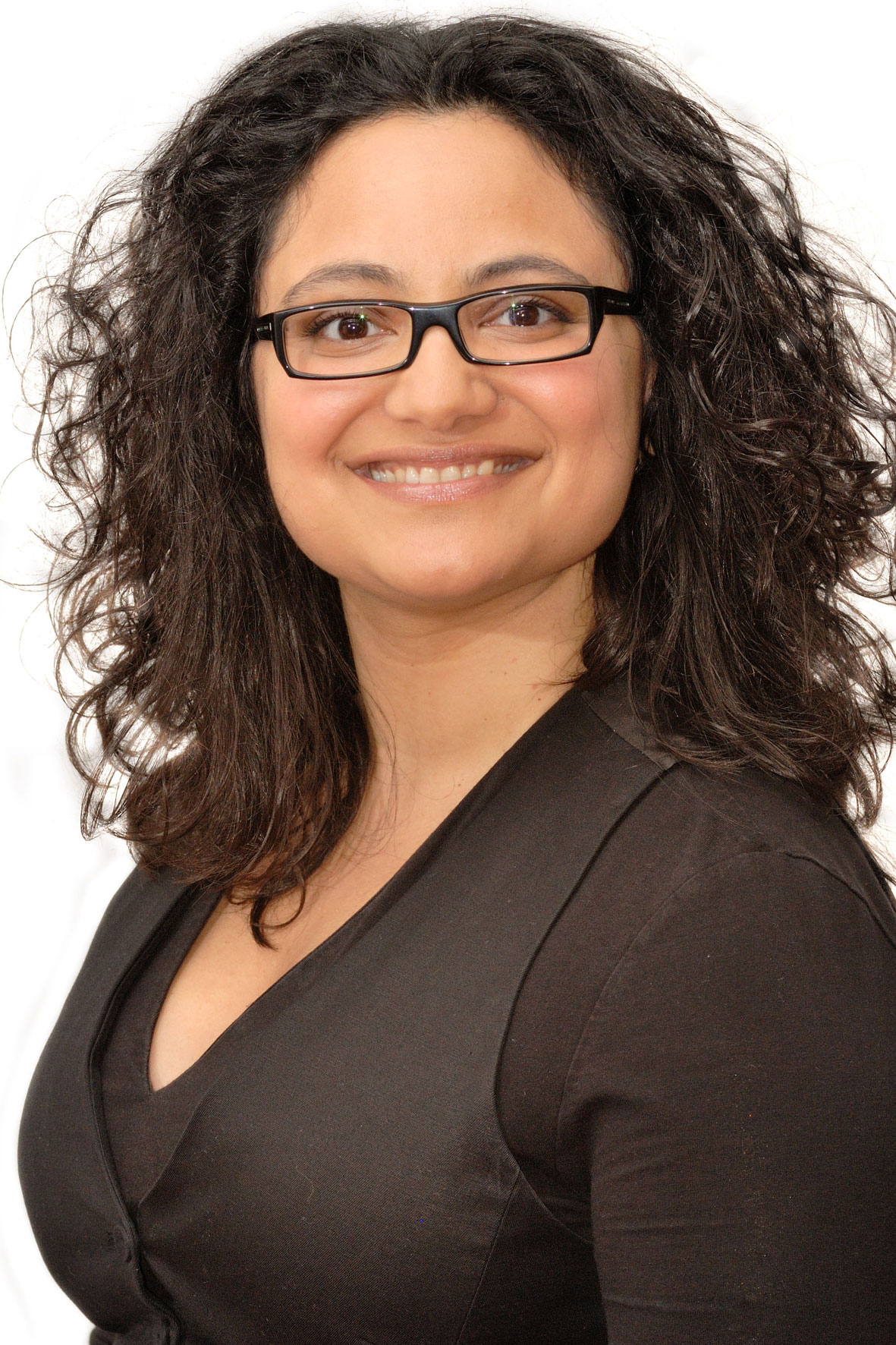
- Born: 24 August 1980 (age 45); Salta, Argentina
- Occupations: Film and theater director, producer, writer
- Organization: Association of Women Filmmakers and Audiovisual Media
- Website: www.marielmacia.com

Mariel Maciá (born 24 August 1980) is an Argentine-Spanish film director, theater director, screenwriter, and producer.

== Biography ==
As of 2018, Mariel Maciá has written and directed six short films. The first of them, Despedida (o la crisis argentina), was released in 2003. El gran plan (o las parejas de Ana) (2005), Leo y Abril (o la historia de un guión) (2006), and Dos extraños (o como nos conocimos) (2006) complete the first part of her work.

In 2006 her short film Flores en el parque (o los primeros besos) obtained more than 600,000 views on YouTube. It was entered in film festivals, culminating in seven awards:

- LesGaiCineMad (Madrid, Spain): Best Spanish Work and Best Short Film
- Islantilla Film Festival (Huelva, Spain): Chameleon of the Official Jury for the Best Short Film on Video
- QCinema International Festival (Texas, United States): Best Dramatic Short Film
- Dunas Short Film Festival (Fuerteventura, Spain): Best Female Performance (Diana Díez)
- CineGaiLast Festival (Gijón, Spain): Best Short Film
- International Short Film Festival of São Paulo (São Paulo, Brazil): Silver Rabbit for Best Short Film

In 2007 she wrote, produced, and directed the short film A domicilio (o incluso también el amor). It premiered at LesGaiCineMad and was subsequently entered in other LGBT film festivals such as Outfest (Los Angeles, United States), Frameline (San Francisco, United States), and the London Lesbian and Gay Film Festival (London, United Kingdom). It received the following awards:

- LesGaiCineMad (Madrid, Spain): Best Spanish Work and Best Short Film
- International Cineffable Festival (Paris, France): Best Medium-length Fiction Film
- Long Island Gay and Lesbian Film Festival (New York, United States): Best Female Short Film
- Canary Islands Gay and Lesbian Film Festival (Gran Canaria, Spain): Best Short Film

In 2008 Maciá premiered the play Monólogos de Bollería Fina at the Madrid Pride Day and it returned to be revived at the 2010 Pride Day. In Barcelona it was also performed at the Circuit Festival in 2008 and revived there in 2010.

In 2010 she participated in the new technologies and formats round table at the 2nd International Meeting of the Association of Women Filmmakers and Audiovisual Media (CIMA) within the Agenda of the Presidency of the European Union of Spain. Subsequently, she has participated regularly in round tables, seminars, and congresses related to films made by women and new technologies.

She served as a member of the CIMA Board of Directors in 2011.

== Filmography ==
- 2003 – Despedida (o la crisis argentina) (short)
- 2005 – El gran plan (o las parejas de Ana) (short)
- 2006 – Leo y Abril (o la historia de un guión) (short)
- 2006 – Dos extraños (o como nos conocimos) (short)
- 2006 – Flores en el parque (o los primeros besos) (short)
- 2007 – A domicilio (o incluso también el amor) (short)
