= Luis Muñoz (poet) =

Luis Muñoz is a Spanish poet, author, and University of Iowa professor.

== Early life and education ==
Muñoz was born in Granada, Spain in 1966. He earned degrees in both Hispanic philology and romance studies from the University of Granada. Muñoz also holds a PhD in Spanish Literature.

== Career ==
Muñoz has published seven collections of poetry: Un Momento (2024); Vecindad (2018); Querido silencio (2006), which won El Público award; Correspondencias (2001), which won the Generación del 27 and Ojo Crítico awards; El apetito (1998); Manzanas amarillas (1995); and Septiembre (1991).

His poetic work up to 2005 is also gathered in the book Limpiar pescado. Poesía reunida 1991-2005 (2005). A bilingual selection of his poems, From Behind What Landscape. New and Selected Poems, translated by Curtis Bauer and with a foreword by Ilya Kaminsky, was published in 2015.

He teaches at the University of Iowa, where he is director of the MFA in Spanish Creative Writing Program.

== Works ==
Vecindad (Visor, 2018). A poetry collection by Luis Muñoz, published by Visor in 2018. The book functions as a structural guide to poetry. In a review for the work, literary critic Juan Carlos Abril praised the collection for its accessibility to both initiated readers and laymen.

Querido silencio (Tusquets, 2006). A collection characterized by minimalist language and open-ended poems, which won the El Público award.

Limpiar pescado. Poetry collected (Visor, 2005). Poetry reunited collects his four books published until 2005 and a section with new poems.

Correspondencias (Visor, 2001) is taken from "Correspondances", Baudelaire's sonnet. “The title wants to highlight a main mechanism of poetry, that of analogy, the proposal of routes between elements of different levels of reality, that of the senses, that of ideas, that of feelings, but stripping them of the« profound unity ”, which is what Baudelaire and the poets of his time aspired to” (Luis Muñoz).

El apetito (PreTextos, 1998). “I chose the title The Appetite after writing almost all the poems in the book. After reading them several times to find a link between them, I realized that the common thing, at the time of conceiving them, in their starts, was the immediate desire. Of what? Travel, melancholy, responses from the senses, intensities, truffled feelings, love-hate, pain-pleasure, activity-lassitude ”(Luis Muñoz).

Manzanas amarillas (Hiperión, 1995), winner of the Prize for Poetry "Ciudad de Córdoba", the jury "especially appreciated its unitary conception that, based on memory and from a reflective attitude, he manages to build an imaginary world in which everyday and symbolic elements are harmonized ”. In Muñoz's words: “The title Yellow apples was suggested to me by a poem by Ives Boneffoy, from his book The Beginning and End of the Snow that I had read in the translation by Jesús Munárriz. Boneffoy offers in his poem the image of an apple orchard after the snowfall. The haunting and fugitive beauty of the apples of the tree with a crown of snow, which has the image of the arrest of time that goes by, the consistency of snow, the ripeness of the apple, and a metaphor of the aspiration of poetry to find signs of what we are, what we are made of, it seemed to me that it could help me to consider the book as a search for other yellow apples in contact with its snow crown, to make the book an attempt at a collection of images with capacity to summarize some complexity without previously wanting to reduce them to a meaning ”.

Septiembre (Hiperión, 1991). September is a disbelieving and melancholic reflection on the first consciousness of time gone by, on the end of the summer of the first youth and the alien territory of one's own experiences.

== Personal life ==
Muños lives between Iowa City and Madrid. He is married to poet and novelist Garth Greenwell.
