= Julio Aumente =

Spanish poet and writer

Julio Aumente (1921–2006) was a Spanish poet and writer.

== Bibliography ==
- The Air Does Not Return Madrid: Ignatius Press, 1955.
- The Silences Madrid: Ignatius Press, 1958.
- The Slope. Sark (1947 - 1965) Sevilla Calle del Aire, 1982.
- Foyer (1981-1983, foreword by Luis Antonio de Villena, Madrid: Visor, 1983
- Michele Green Laurel, Malaga Jarazmín, 1984.
- Princes of Seville: Renaissance, 1990.
- The Song of the Harpies, foreword by Luis Antonio de Villena. San Lorenzo de El Escorial: Libertarian-Prodhufi Publishing SA, 1993.
- Of Goats or Psychic Love and Málaga: Department of Culture and Environment, Provincial Delegation, 1992
- The Interview and Other poems, Córdoba: Journal of the Inn, 1994.
- Collected Poems, 1955-1999, followed by the unpublished book Rollers, editing and foreword Inglada Rafael Luis Antonio de Villena. Madrid: Visor, 2004.
