= Lesbians in Francoist Spain =

Lesbians in Francoist Spain had to contend with a culture where a fascist state met with a form of conservative Roman Catholicism to impose very rigid, traditional gender roles. In the immediate post-Civil War period, the new regime was not concerned with homosexuals in general, but instead were focused on changing laws to enforce restrictive gender norms like repealing divorce. While original laws banning homosexuality were on the books and enforced using a 1933 law, they were changed in 1954 and 1970. Unlike male homosexuality, lesbians were less clearly addressed by these laws and were much less frequently prosecuted for the crime of homosexuality. Lesbians from that period are hard to identify because they were not identified as such, and often identified as prostitutes instead.

Lesbians were repressed in Spain, using cultural, religious, psychiatric and medical institutions to facilitate this repression. During the Franco period, lesbians were forced into an inescapable closet that sometimes led to suicide. Consequently, lesbian culture was pushed underground. Women had to meet clandestinely and use code words to identify each other. They created their own unique family units, married men or had fake marriages to gay men. Some entered convents. Being outed posed dangers, including that they would be subjected to electroshock treatment as part of conversion therapy. Still, lesbians threw parties, went to the movies, and, starting the year Franco died, they created their own bar scene. Oculto sendero by Elena Fortún and the lesbian poetry of Lucía Sánchez Saornil were the most important works of early lesbian literature of this period, before the lesbian literary movement really began to take off in 1964 with works like Ana María Matute's 1964 novel The Soldiers Cry at Night (Spanish: Los soldados lloran de noche)

An independent history of lesbianism as a political movement in Spain does not begin until 1975, the year Franco died, as lesbian voices had been intentionally silenced prior to this. In this early period a transition to democracy, the voices of gay men were often louder with lesbians playing important support roles because of historically greater past gay male visibility and continuing patriarchy. In 1977, Barcelona-based Front d'Alliberament Gai de Catalunya (FAGC) became the first gay men's organization to have a lesbian section. The first lesbian organization, Grup de Lluita per l'Alliberament de la Dona, in Spain would not be founded until 1979 in Barcelona. Political tensions would see lesbians split from gay men by 1981 and they would not join together again until the early 1990s.

== Francoist definitions of womanhood ==
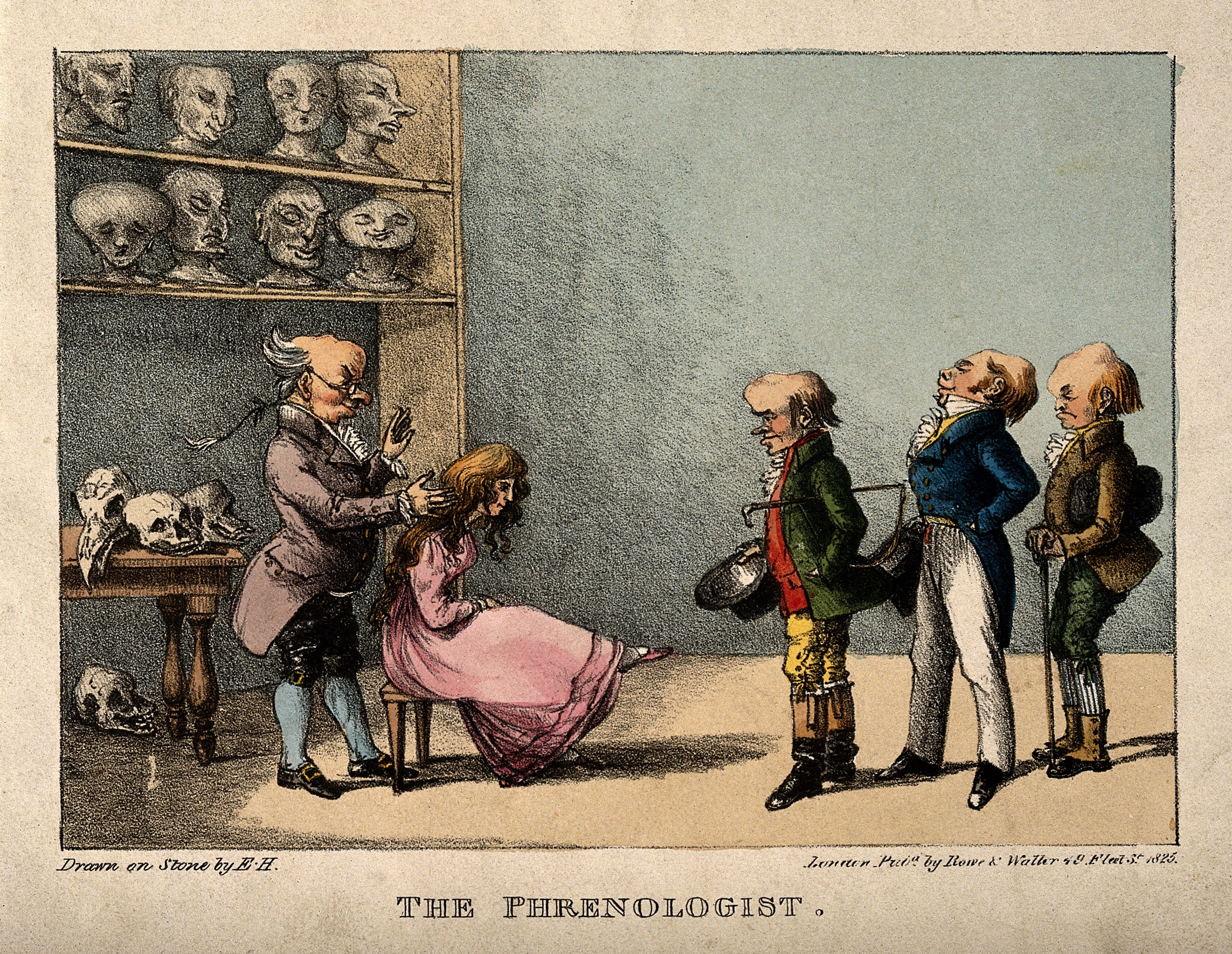
Franz Joseph Gall examining the head of a pretty young girl

Anyone who did not fit into traditional gender norms and who expressed any deviance from Roman Catholic sexual norms was viewed as a sexual pervert. While some women quietly questioned their biologically determined place in society, male intellectuals provided rationals to support Francoist policies that used medical and biological sciences, along with anatomy and physiological studies. These works often drew on phrenological works by doctors such as Franz Joseph Gall that were later translated into Spanish. Carmen de Burgos Seguí published one such translation in La inferioridad mental de la mujer which said, "Many female characteristics are very similar to those of beasts; mainly the lack of a main of their own. Since the beginning of times they have functions like that, hence the human race would be stagnated in its original state if there were only women."

Misogyny and heteronormativity where linchpins of fascism in Spain, where the philosophy revolved around patria and fixed gender roles that praised the role of strong male leadership. While not putting women in prison, this ideological position effectively made women prisoners of their home, with imprisonment aided by the Catholic Church and Spain's educational system. The ideology of Francoism was opposed to gays, lesbians, transgender people, asexuals and anyone who did not fit into neatly constructed and enforced ideological gender roles. Lesbians were a particular threat because lesbian women remove themselves from the process of biological reproduction.

The Catholic Church in Spain in this period continued to perpetuate teachings that subjugated women. This included a belief that women should be covered up, chaste and virginal. Any women who broke this mold were evil temptresses in the vein of Eve. Women were encouraged to model themselves after Mary, the mother of Jesus. Women were taught to be asexual beings. Women in Francoist Spain had problems meeting their own heterosexual desires, required through state indoctrination to forgo female sexual expression. Heterosexual female desire represented for men an undesirable and perverted female attribute. Lesbians faced this and more, with a reality that for most, there could be zero expression of any sexual desire, let along for that of other women unless they wanted to put themselves in opposition to the regime.

Starting in the 1950s, Spain started adopting a more consumerist economy. This would continue on into the 1960s and would play a role in introducing Spanish women to the new modern Western woman. This introduction would result in the eschewing of the concept of True Catholic Womanhood. By the end of the 1960s, the destiny of lesbians in Spain was changing as women increasingly began to express their dissatisfaction with state imposed patriarchy. Their dissatisfaction would play a large role in the later collapse of the regime following Franco's death.

== Societal views of lesbians ==
For many in the Franco period, lesbians were considered straight women who sought needed sexual satisfaction from other women because their sexual needs were neglected by men. For others, lesbians were any women who challenged stereotypical culturally enforced gender roles. Society did not conceptualize lesbians in the same way as it did gay men. Psychiatrists espoused a belief that women were lesbians because of the everyday desire to be a man in order to be with the mother. They also claimed it was a result of neurosis, narcissism, or immaturity. It was not a result of congenital or hereditary factors.

Regime fear of homosexuality would lead to carefully curated single sexed spaces that reinforced gender stereotypes. Sección Feminina encouraged women's sport but only some. Athletics were viewed as problematic because they encouraged a more masculine style of dress to compete. The organization feared this masculine dress style would lead young women into becoming lesbians.

With lesbian behavior being hard for militant patriachialists to conceptualize, it often meant it was harder for homophobes to attack them directly. While make it easier for lesbians to blend, broader cultural implications made it for this same culture to engage in widespread lesbian erasure. This erasure is expressed most clearly in Anna María Moix's 1969 work Julia.

Ahead of the Year of the Woman, the government created eight commissions to investigate the status of Spanish women. The government used reports from these commissions to produce two reports that were published in 1975. They were La situación de la mujer en España and Memoria del Año Internacional de la Mujer. Among the findings were that the number of lesbians was increasing as a result of a number of factors including "physical or congenital defects", the "affective traumas and unsatisfied desires", family being unable to prevent women's conversation, "Contagion and mimicry" and "[...] the lack of relationship with men as a consequence of an excess education rigidly rigid, the existence of institutions that by their very nature eliminate these relationships: prisons, hospitals, psychiatric, religious communities etc ..., the media, tourism, alcohol, drugs and desire of search for new sensations, prostitution, and vice." To tackle the problem of the growing lesbian population, the government commission proposed solutions like "early diagnoses and medical treatments and psychotherapeutics that [corrected] possible somatic defects", creating a sex education program and the promotion of the idea that both genders can peacefully co-exist.

Tourism and urbanization were two leading causes for greater societal toleration of homosexuality in the waning days of the Franco period.

== Laws around women and homosexuality ==
In the immediate post-war period, the government's primary concern was removing political and armed resistance. LGBT people were not and would not be a major focus until they had eliminated these threats, and were able to force a form of conservative Catholicism on the populace. More pressing issues for lesbians included a return to a reduced legal status. The repeal of the law allowing divorce occurred on 23 September 1939, and severely restricted ways which in women, including gender non-conforming lesbians, could behave outside their homes by placing legal and cultural constraints on them.

"Two women who lived together were not suspects, which is why the law was not enforced, but when something does not exist, it is not claimed."

— Maria Giralt, Managing Director of Gayles TV

The 1932 Penal Code with its concepts of “estado peligroso” and “defensa social” were re-purposed by Franco in 1954 to criminalize homosexuality as a sex crime. The 1933 Ley de Vagos y Maleantes was used by the Franco regime until 1970 to criminally punish homosexuals. The 1933 law meant the police could detain anyone they suspected of being a homosexual. The 1954 modification largely excluded lesbians from legal punishment as the law did not conceptualize that two women could have sex with each other. The 1933 constitutional replacement was the 1970 Ley de Peligrosidad Social, which labeled homosexuality as a mental illness. These laws would later be used to imprison women and to commit them to mental institutions. Under the 1933 era law, only two charges were against women. One of the woman prosecuted under the law was prosecuted in the period between 1971 and 1978. The other involved a woman named María Helena who was prosecuted in 1968. Under the 1954 law, only one lesbian was ever charged. Unlike gay men, lesbians were never legally assigned to specific penal colonies or mental institutions. Instead of using existing laws, lesbians in Francoist prisons were charged with prostitution instead of homosexuality, which makes it impossible to determine their true numbers when compared to gay men. This was because the regime had only two categories for women's employment: housewife and prostitute. Despite this, the Franco regime largely could not comprehend lesbian activism, and when they did, they took active steps to erase it. Because of a more active focus on the threat of male homosexuality as an affront to the regime, the number of prosecutions of women was always much lower than those for gay men, especially in the later years of the regime. This was also in part because lesbianism was never made illegal in the same way as male homosexuality as the regime never considered it to be a similar threat.

Lesbians who did find themselves in prison were often easy blackmail targets for guards. This was because a number of lesbians had sex behind bars with other non-political prisoners and prison staff. Some of these relationships were non-consensual as female guards might use their power to force other women to have sex with them and rape them. At camps set up for sexually deviant women, lesbians and other women had their heads shaved and were subjected to a program of feminization that included prayer. Lesbians were among the prisoners held at Caserón de la Goleta, the prison for women in Málaga.

"No, I do not think they should be punished. But I am not in favor of granting freedom or propaganda of homosexuality. I think we have to put limits to this type of deviations, when the instinct is so clearly defined in the Western world. The freedom of the instincts is a respectable freedom ..., provided that it does not under any circumstances affect models of coexistence mostly accepted as positive moral models."

— Enrique Tierno Galván, future mayor of Madrid in 1977

The 1970 law was officially modified on 26 December 1978, and effectively ended active prosecution against "those who perform acts of homosexuality." The enforcement removal did not come with any official state recognition. The law against public scandal continued to be enforced, with many transsexual women continuing to be detained in the following years. Because the law about homosexuality was not fully repealed in 1977 before the new constitution, homosexual men and women affected by it were not able to obtain amnesty like general political prisoners were. LGBT activists would later ask that these homosexuality related offenses be removed from their police identification records. A compromise was eventually made that saw these removed from their public records but maintained in the historical record accessible to historians because of their historical value. Homosexuality would not be fully decriminalized and LGBT organizations would not be allowed to operate in Spain until 1981. Following these early changes, the law and the rights bequeathed by it for lesbians would remain largely unchanged until 2005 with the introduction of the marriage equality law.

In 2009, the Government of Spain passed a law providing compensation to gays, lesbian and transgender people who were imprisoned as a result of 1933 Ley de Vagos y Maleantes and 1970 Ley de Peligrosidad Social. There was a deadline of 31 December 2013 for people to file compensation claims.

In 2018, the Townhall of Barcelona tried to bring six Spanish judges to trial for alleged crimes against humanity for the period between the 1950s and 1970 over their judicial treatment of homosexuals and lesbians. One purpose of this was to purge the official criminal record of 550 people in Barcelona who were charged with homosexuality related offenses. They faced a number of challenges, including a general amnesty law for members of the Franco regime.

=== Case of María Helena ===
21-year-old María Helena was charged in Catalonia with violating the Ley de Vagos y Maleantes on 30 March 1968, with a file number of 296. The charge against her read, "She was arrested when she was in the bar La Gran Cava, located on Calle Conde del Asalto number 25 in a suspicious attitude and dressed as a man. He has no background, stating that he does not engage in any activity, living off the charities he is given and sometimes making blood donations. He says that he dresses as a man so that he can deceive women towards whom he feels an irresistible inclination." (Spanish: Fue detenida cuando se hallaba en el bar La Gran Cava sito en la calle Conde del Asalto número 25 en actitud sospechosa y vestida de hombre. Carece de antecedentes, manifestando que no se dedica a actividad alguna, viviendo de las caridades que le hacen y algunas veces haciendo donaciones de sangre. Dice que se viste de hombre para así poder engañar a las mujeres hacia las que siente una irresistible inclinación.) The act that precipitated her arrest was drinking wine at a bar while appearing in masculine clothes, violating state norms by challenging the gender norms of the period. While there are elements of transvestism in the arrest sheet, it is unclear if she was transgender.

In the sentencing decision, the court ruled, "Her clearly, defined and manifest tendency towards homosexuality, make it particularly dangerous to coexist with the young women who have received this patronage, whom she has already tried to make her homosexual practices in the few days she has been hospitalized. Such dangerousness [...] is what makes us put the aforementioned young woman at the disposal of that Ilmo. Special Court, especially when, to a greater extent, our rehabilitation services inform us in an absolutely negative sense as regards the possibility of reeducation of this young woman, given her age and characteristics." (Spanish: “Su clara, definida y manifiesta tendencia a la homosexualidad, la hacen particularmente peligrosa para convivir con las jóvenes acogidas a este patronato, a las que ya ha pretendido hacer objeto de sus prácticas homosexuales en los escasos días que lleva internada. Tal peligrosidad […] es lo que nos hace poner a la referida joven a disposición de ese Ilmo. Juzgado Especial, máxime, cuando, a mayor abundamiento, nuestros servicios de readaptación nos informan en sentido absolutamente negativo en cuanto a la posibilidad de reeducación de ésta joven, dada su edad y características.”) While initially held in a Barcelona prison, she was then transferred to the Women's Section of the Junta Provincial de Madrid prison facilities as a dependent of the Ministry of Justice. While in prison, her body and mental state are all examined by the state. This included searching for physical deformities, measuring the size of her clitoris and asking for detailed information about her sexual habits.

Her final prison sentence term was given at between 127 days and one year in prison, followed by a 2-year mandatory ban from going to Barcelona, and two years of government supervision. This sentence followed guidance spelled out in the Ley de Vagos y Maleantes.

María Helena's behavior was so transgressive that the state felt a need to interfere with it and punish it. Despite this, the state does not make clear if the problematic nature of her behavior is that it was homosexual and transvestite in manner. Government texts discussing her incarceration do not make clear if Helena was a butch lesbian or a trans man.

=== Case of M.C.D. ===
M.C.D. was sentenced to four months to three years in prison on 21 March 1974 because she was a lesbian. The charge against her was of being "a rebellious homosexual with her family who is in a dangerous state." She was sentenced to re-education under Article 2 of the Law 4 of August 1970 of social dangerousness. Her sentence of for months was based on Article 6. She was arrested by a group of plainclothes policemen. M.C.D. was never sure why they arrested her, if it was because someone denounced or her behavior raised suspicions with the authorities. At the trial, her side did not put up any defense. In the end, the then 17-year-old served four months at the Alcázar de San Juan in Ciudad Real as the state determined that she presented a social danger and needed to be re-educated. Despite the re-education part of the sentence, none actually took place in the prison. Instead, women knit, sewed and did leather crafts. She was compensated, with a very poor wage, for these activities. After her sentence was completed, she was barred from "visiting nightclubs and public establishments where alcoholic beverages are consumed for two years."

Arrested when she was a 16-year-old, M.C.D. was interrogated repeatedly, where she was asked incomprehensible questions. She said of the experience, "For months I was subjected to a pantomime persecutory that I did not understand at all and that ended in a paranoia of lasting effects for life." At the time of her arrest, she was a student. She was intellectually curious, always wanting to know how and why things happened.

On 15 October 2009, M.C.D. filed a complaint with the government asking to be compensated for her incarceration. Her claim was approved on 23 December 2009. The claim was the first made by a lesbian woman. Members of the LGBT community hoped the case would encourage other lesbians to make claims and to assist in the broader lesbian community in reclaiming dignity stripped of them by imprisonment or internment in asylums during the Franco regime. M.C.D. said of her own experiences and desire for compensation, "The important thing is to remember so that it does not repeat itself, since sometimes it seems that we are going backwards." By law, her name and place of residence could not be made public as part of the claims process. M.C.D. felt disgust over these limitations, but refused to provide her own details about her life as she felt it would put her and her partner's safety at risk.

== Lesbian culture ==
Repression of lesbians differed from gay men in Spain in that cultural, religious, psychiatric and medical institutions were used to domesticate lesbians. Men in contrast were repressed using legislative and penitentiary tools. Gay male persecution was similar to that of other socially undesirable elements. Later, the regime would view male homosexuality as a contagion for which psychiatric tools could be used to prevent its spread. This resulted in the formalization of specialized centers for incarceration.

Being a lesbian in this period was about being forced into the closet with no chance of escape. They hid their identities from family, friends, their church community and their employers. Homosexual women during the Franco period could only meet each other clandestinely, perpetuating a silencing of their voices and rendering them unintelligible to outsiders. The clandestine nature of their relationships rendered lesbians invisible and prone to having collective imagery about them negatively defined by the state and its apparatus. The need to constantly be alert to the potential of discovery of their orientation stressed out many lesbians. It could also lead to isolation, as they cut ties to groups who might discover they were lesbians. This included religious and social groups. Some lesbians could not deal with the pressures they faced and committed suicide.

Because of the Franco regime's beliefs about women, including an inability to understand lesbianism, there was an underground culture available for lesbian women. Where multiple men using public urinals was suspect, girls having parties without boys in attendance was viewed less circumspectly as it was assumed by many that they were being pure by not inviting boys. Their invisibility protected lesbians in ways that it did not protect men because many people believed lesbianism did not exist. Lesbians would often use code words, such as librarian or bookseller (Spanish: libreras), to identify one another. Younger lesbians might identify each other by asking, "Are you a comic?" (Spanish: ¿Eres tebeo?). Because beaches were gender segregated, it was often an easy place for lesbians to socialize. They organized cabarets where they could more legitimately question gender norms while socializing strictly with other women. Lesbians created their own economic networks to insure their ability to survive. They also created their own spaces where they could feel free, including placed near Parallel and las Ramblas in Barcelona. Matilde Albarracín described their actions as they related to the regime and cultural attitudes of the time as, "So subversive."

Because the Spanish cultural and government apparatus have often been centered around the concept of family, many members of the lesbian community sought to create their own non-traditional family units. Later, in the post-Franco period, these lesbian family units would serve as political reasons for many activists seeking for rights recognition in areas such as claims of political asylum, adoption rights and the right to habeas corpus. Unmarried women could cohabitate together in a culturally acceptable way, being accepted or dismissed as cousins (Spanish: primas) while two men cohabitating together were attacked as queers (Spanish: maricones). These cohabitating women were sometimes mocked as women who could not find men who would tolerate them. These attitudes though helped to erase lesbians by allowing their preferential status as women who stayed at home to define them more than their orientation. At the same time, the lack of assumptions about the sexual nature of their relationships meant women constantly feared being outed.

Some lesbians were married to men and had children. Some married after being in prison to escape societal pressures to conform. Other lesbians married before understanding their sexuality, and put these relationships at risk by meeting in secret with female lovers. Lesbians would sometimes feel guilty about what they were doing, feeling isolated and alone. This would sometimes drive women to go to church to confess to having impure thoughts. Sometimes, lesbian couples lived with a gay male couple. They might even use these men for semen donations, so they could have children and continue to portray themselves as culturally acceptable heterosexuals. With few outlets to escape the confines of marriage, some lesbians in rural areas deliberately sought out convents as a safer place to exist. The convent allowed them to more easily hide their sexual orientation and sexuality.

Lesbians were at risk of imprisonment during this period because of their orientation. Families also highly disapproved, and conversion therapy using electroshock treatment was not unheard of. Some women died within a few years of being given electroshock treatment. This sort of conversion therapy and problems with family estrangement would continue on into the Spanish transition to democracy. For many lesbians, it would be a tough choice as to which was worse: prison or mental institutions where conversion therapy took place. In addition to the threat of conversion therapy, lesbians had to worry about other aspects of their family discovering their orientation. This included being disowned by their family or being assaulted by family members because of their orientation.

In rural areas, lesbians were tremendously isolated. Their youthful experiences could be quite lonely and sad, as they had no one to turn to to provide guidance. Some of these lesbians sought to escape this life by moving to more urban areas. Some lesbians in rural areas sought to escape through education. Once that was attained, their options were often limited to teaching where they would continually fear being outed. If parents suspected teachers of being lesbians, they might and did withdraw their children from the school.

1920s and 1930s had created a fashion shift in Spain that allowed women to echo their foreign counterparts in wearing clothes and styles traditionally associated with masculinity. This enabled more self-expression among lesbians of the period. Franco's victory shut down this fashion outlet of expression, with the imposition of a generic feminine women's style that attempted to oblate female sexual identity. Lesbians ability to use clothes to express their sexuality would not happen again until the 1960s.

Even though lesbians were given more freedom following the death of Franco, lesbian culture continued to be mostly invisible to the larger Spanish populace well into the 1990s, being referred to as the hidden homosexuality (Spanish: una homosexualidad oculta). Gay men were out of the closet, but lesbians continued to be marginalized and hidden. During the Franco period, Chueca was a working-class neighborhood that was also home to many working class Spanish prostitutes. The area would later transform into one of the most important hubs of radical leftist Spanish thinking and be an intrinsic part of Madrileño LGBT identity.

For lesbians in the late transition period, the act of sex became about ongoing negotiations on personal sexual pleasure as lesbian identity and culture were bound together with the concept of lesbians being able to express their own sexuality and sexual needs.

=== Social activities ===
Lesbians were not confined to their homes during the Franco regime. Many socialized with other lesbians and non-LGB acquaintances both in and outside their homes, with their own cultural norms and rules. When lesbians socialized with each other but still in broader society in places like theaters, cafes, cabarets and literary gatherings, they would use pseudonyms to make it harder for people to be able to identify them if they were inadvertently outed. La Cabana Cafe and the baños orientales at the Barceloneta beach were popular meeting spots in Barcelona.

In urban areas, lesbians would sometimes throw women only parties. Because they were single and not sexually involved with men, while still in the closet, they were often accepted by their neighbors who viewed them as good examples of Spanish womanhood and who applauded their not socializing with men. They also developed their own social networks.

One of the first lesbian bars to open in Spain was Daniel's, which opened in 1975 in Plaza de Cardona in the barrio of Sant Gervasi in Barcelona. The bar attracted a wide variety of clientele including university students, housewives, celebrities and lesbian prostitutes from across the whole of Spain. It had a dance floor with a red light. When the red light went on, it signaled a police raid, and women then sat down and started talking.

=== Media ===
The 1950s, 1960s and early 1970s are considered to be a "period of the catacombs" where literature for everyone in the LGBT community was underground. Despite draconian policies policing the LGBT community, lesbians were able to attain literature from abroad including French newsletters and magazines like Arcadia founded in 1957 which was more gay focused, Groupe de lesbiennes which started publishing in 1976 in Paris, and Quand les Femmes s'aiment, published from 1978 to 1980.

=== Literature ===
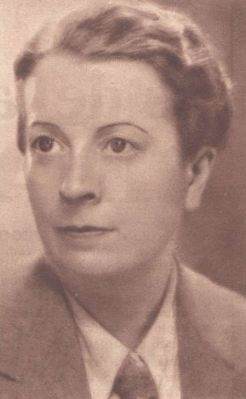
Eleana Fortún in Crónica Magazine, Madrid, June 1936.

An open and accessible Spanish literary tradition for lesbians would not start until the end of Francoism. The most significant piece of Spanish lesbian literature in the early and middle Franco period was Oculto sendero by Elena Fortún, which while never officially published until 2017 was circulating by 1945 and told the fictionalized account of a Spanish lesbian in exile. The author was more famous for other works, and was the Spanish equivalent for many young Spanish readers as Richmal Crompton, Mark Twain or Roald Dahl were for American and British readers. The lesbian poetry of Lucía Sánchez Saornil fell into oblivion during the Franco period as the writer went into hiding and tried to anonymize herself in order to protect both herself and her partner.

Spanish lesbian literature has three main periods. The first is from 1964 to 1975, during the last years of the Franco regime. The second is the transition period of 1975 to 1985. The last period was from 1985 to the present. Novels featuring lesbian characters during the regime included Ana María Matute's 1964 novel The Soldiers Cry at Night (Spanish: Los soldados lloran de noche). The lesbian character is featured as a morally reprehensible woman. The next major novel was the 1967 Premio Nadal finalist The Last Summer in the Mirror (Spanish: El útimo verano en el espejo) by Teresa Barbero, where the lesbian couple is portrayed as being bad women who struggle to conform with their social reality. The next major novel is Julia, published by Ana María Moix in 1969. The main lesbian character expresses sexual desires for other women including her aunt and a professor. Celia Bites the Apple (Spanish: Celia muerde la manzana) by María Luz Malecón in 1972 implies through its lesbian characters that being a lesbian is a result of trauma or people who provide a bad influence on their lives. Time of the Cherries (Spanish: Tiempo de cerezas) by Montserret Roig in 1976 is an example of the cliche of students in an all girls school having lesbian sexual experiences.

During the 1960s, Ester Tusquets and her brother Oscar were the owners and influential forces behind the left leaning antidictatorial publisher Editorial Lumen. Starting in 1968, following the departure of Oscar, the publisher began publishing works by gay men, women in general and lesbians specifically, along with foreign works, cultural theory texts and children's stories. The Same Sea as Every Summer (Spanish: El mismo mar de todos los veranos) was published by Tusquets in 1978, while Love is a Solitary Game (Spanish: El amor es un juego solitario) was published a year later and the final book of her trilogy, Stranded (Spanish: Varada tas el último naufragio) was published in 1980. These works were part of an important lesbian political literary criticism of the stresses faced by lesbians in try to exist in a heterosexist society. They were published in the same period as Carmen Riera's 1980 A Woman's Word (Spanish: Palabra de mujer), another important work in the lesbian literary canon of the period.

The first major out lesbian writer was Andrea Luca. Gloria Fuertes, Ana María Moix, Ana Rosetti, Ester Tusquets, Carme Riera, Elana Fortún and Isabel Franc were all in the closet during the Franco regime or the first stages of the transition. Lesbian writers did not start to come out until the 1990s. Most of the lesbian literary body in this period came from outside Madrid and Castile, with many being multi-lingual. Catalonia produced Riera, Roig and Laforet. Galicia produced Mayoral. Extebarria was a Basque from Valencia.

Despite the liberalization of Spanish society in the immediate transition period, literature featuring lesbian characters tended to conform to historical type of being secondary figures and representing insubordination against oppressive heteronormative societal norms. While gay men were the more visible homosexuals in the Franco and transition period, women writers would be at the forefront of normalizing homosexuality in literature for the average Spanish reader in the final Franco years and first years of the transition. Women writers like Ester Tusquets were the first to break taboo subjects like female desire. Political feminism that saw lesbianism as a natural endpoint for women began to become a bigger theme in some feminist works of this period.

=== Movies ===
Homosexuality began to be addressed in a more open and liberal manner in Spanish films starting in the 1970s. Most of the important works were produced by men and featured male homosexual characters. Basque Eloy de la Iglesia was an important film director of this type in this era.

Dark Habits (Spanish: Entre tinieblas) was released in 1983. Written by Pedro Almodóvar, it featured Julieta Serrano as a lesbian Mother Superior of a Spanish convent. The film was revolutionary in breaking the mold of conservative depictions of lesbians in Spanish cinema by using Serrano's character as a vehicle to criticize the Roman Catholic Church and by challenging the Franco driven view that only two type of women existed: decent conservative women and evil, sexually promiscuous liberal women. The film was rejected by the Cannes Film Festival on account of its apparently sacrilegious treatment of religion, and although it had its premiere on 9 September at the Venice Film Festival, some of the organizing committee considered it blasphemous and anti-Catholic and it was not shown in the official section. Almodóvar's provocative and in your face dealing with homosexuality Entre tinieblas and his 1982 film Laberinto de pasiones were viewed by parts of the LGB community as a necessary responsive to the oppressive nature of state-censorship during the Franco period that condemned and erased them.

Liberal depictions of lesbians by lesbian film makers would not begin until much later, during the 1990s. Influential films of this period included 1996's Costa Brava by director Marta Balletbó-Coll and Ana Simón Cerezo.

Electroshock (2007) is a film that shows the impact of imprisonment of lesbians during the time of Franco and the effects of electroshock conversion therapy. It was based on a real life story.

The documentary Bones of Contention was released in 2017, and focused on describing everyday life for gays and lesbians during the Franco regime. The movie was written by filmmaker Andrea Weiss.

== Lesbianism political movement ==
Lesbianism as a specific social, cultural and historical identity did not exist in Spain until during much of the Franco period. This was in part because while lesbianism was culturally taboo, norms around women allowed them to walk arm-in-arm down the street unmolested except by a few aggressive and insulting men.

An independent history of lesbianism as a political movement in Spain does not begin until 1975, as lesbian voices had been intentionally silenced prior to this. This late emergence meant that lesbians had to largely independently political define themselves both inside the established feminist movement and the gay and transgender movement at a time when Spanish society as a whole and these movements specifically were undergoing major stresses as a result of the death of Franco. Despite this, lesbianism as a political movement still maintained a low profile, with a limited voice as part of broader discussions. Politically, lesbians in the immediate post-Franco Spain were often nothing more than supporters of their more vocal and visible male counterparts because of greater past gay male visibility and continuing patriarchy. Some radical feminists in this period would choose lesbianism as a form of exerting control over their sexuality that had been repressed by the Franco regime. There were arguments at the time over the way to be both a feminist and a lesbian. The lesbian political movement at the time largely concluded that lesbian sexuality "did not have to be soft or aggressive, nor follow any feminist or feminine pattern."

It was not until the mid-1990s that lesbianism as a unique political movement began to step independently into the political sphere, demanding legal equality and citizenship rights enjoyed by the rest of the Spanish populace. This period would herald in an exponential increase in the number of lesbian only political groups. Some groups would seek international affiliation and media attention, while others would seek to organize while hiding or downplaying their lesbian identities in the service of other women. For politically active lesbians during the late stages of the transition, a key component of their activism was about lesbian sexuality and the ability to express it freely, despite stereotypes that suggested women, and lesbians in particular, were less interested in sex because there is nothing after sex once the act of penetration is removed. For lesbians of this period, the act of sex became about ongoing negotiations on personal sexual pleasure.

In Spain, the broader homosexual rights movement was known as GLTB during the 1980s and 1990s. This served to exacerbate gender imbalances in the movement, by signaling to women that they were not wanted. This would be slow to change when in relation to forming LGB identities, with lesbians being slower to abandon the femme/butch identity than Spanish gay men with their queen/bear identities. (Note: In other literature describing the period, the acronyms GL, GLB, and LG are often used, with B for bisexual and T for transgender not being used until a much later date as they were not connected in the same way to the previous period of orientation being defined around sexual acts and identities contrary to the reproductive needs of the Spanish state. Q for queer does not enter the conversation until a much later period, and often used in a contemporaneous context to describe historical events that are exclusively describing gays and lesbians as a short hand for homosexuality. Given these complex issues, the acronyms used in the article are based on ones used in sources to reflect this reality.)

Front d'Alliberament Gai de Catalunya (FAGC) became the first gay men's organization to have a lesbian section. The group was created in 1977 in Barcelona, after the first pride march in Spain. Maria Giralt was given a list of 30 names and phone numbers of women who attended, called them all up and got 10 to show up at Bar Núria for the new organization's first meeting. Being part of FAGC turned out to be problematic as the organization was full of blatant and latent misogyny. When the women asked the organization to create posters for their events, FAGC would often create them with phallic symbols all over them despite protests to not do that. This type of action by gay men would push many of these women into becoming radical feminism.

The first lesbian organization in Spain, Grup de Lluita per l'Alliberament de la Dona, was not founded until 1979 in Barcelona. Despite this, lesbians continued to maintain a lower profile in the LGBT community in Spain than their gay male peers. When not maintaining a lower profile, they were actively ignored by their male peers as completely unimportant. It was not until 1987 with the arrest of two women for kissing on 28 July that lesbian political activism took on a bigger stage, with lesbian groups holding a massive protest with a public kiss at the Puerta del Sol in Madrid, which has been repeated annually since then.

Tensions between gays and lesbians led to the creation in 1981 of the Colectivo de Feministas Lesbianas de Madrid (CFLM), and the Grupo de Acción por la Liberación Homosexual (GALHO), which was somewhat less radical than the Frente de Liberación Homosexual de Castilla (FLHOC). Despite these external tensions, politically active lesbians faced fewer issues around internal dissent about ideology than their male counterparts. Shared experiences during the Franco regime acted as a social and political glue that bound them together strongly. They often found themselves politically situated among radical feminists of the period. Politically, lesbians and their gay male counterparts would continue to be separate through the final part of the transition period in 1985 and remain separated until the early 1990s when marriage equality became a goal of many in the broader LG movement. (Note: Unlike in some other countries, the concept of civil partnerships was never widely discussed in Spain as an alternative to marriage. This was in part because LG activists were insistent from the onset of the conversation that they demanded full equality under the law. While Partido Popular briefly considered the concept in 1997 and 2002, the LGB activists's political partner of PSOE understood the community was willing to make the sacrifices necessary to achieve full legal marriage equality. The LGB community's desire for full marriage equality was in part a response to what the realization of lesser legal partnerships under Partido Popular would actually mean and how they would be implemented. They feared that legally it could actually mean merely cohabitation.)

During the early 1990s, much of lesbian political thought was on practical issues, where there was not a heavy emphasis on developing broader LGB theory that underpinned their political activities.

=== Broader LG political movement ===
Barcelona was at the forefront of some early Spanish LG activism in the last days of the regime and the transition. Broader Spanish homosexual liberation movements during the 1970s were closer to the French movement, where personal and sexual liberation were perceived as necessary goals towards gays and lesbians developing a new social consciousness that would lead to a social revolution. It differed from American and British activists who were keen to develop political connections and change the legal status for members of the LG community, while maintaining links to explicitly leftist organizations.

Agrupación Homófila para la Igualdad Sexual (AGHOIS), later renamed Movimiento Español de Liberación Homosexual (MELH) in 1975, was created in 1970 as a liberation movement for homosexuals. The purpose of the group was to influence the Church, arts, medicine, law, sociology and the press to change their stereotypical views about homosexuality and combat negative indoctrination which said homosexuality was evil. The mostly gay male Barcelona based group kept meetings to eight people or fewer in order to avoid attracting attention from the government. They felt compelled to start organizing in response to the 1970 Ley sobre peligrosidad y rehabilitación social. Their work dismayed other members of the LGBT community as they believed it entailed too much risk without any substantial reward. They started publishing an eponymous newsletter of the same name in 1972.

Front d'Alliberament Gai de Catalunya was formed in 1975 in Barcelona, and two years later, in 1977, would host the first Spanish Gay Pride march which saw participation from lesbians, politicians and union members. This was the first LGBT political event in the country's history at a time when such protests were still illegal. 4,000 people took part, and lesbian marchers chanted, "Behind the windows, there are lesbians!" Lesbian participants included Maria Giralt.

Following the achievements involving changes to the law to decriminalize homosexuality in the late 1970s following the death of Franco and transition to democracy, much of the GL activist structure was dismantled as the immediate needs in the transition period were perceived as having been accomplished. Consequently, the community also began to fracture along ideological grounds, particularly among gay liberationists.

== Lesbian in exile ==
Carmen Conde, Victorina Durán, Margarita Xirgu, Ana María Sagi, Irene Polo, and Lucía Sánchez Saornil survived the war as Spain's most famous lesbians, but all were required to go into exile for their own survival. While relatively open about their orientation in exile, they all tried to maintain levels of discretion about it. Lucía Sánchez Saornil went into exile at the end of the Civil War, facing three disadvantages: being a woman, a writer and a lesbian.

During the 1950s, 62-year-old Victoria Kent became involved with New York philanthropist Louise Crane, who was 15 years her junior, while living in exile. Starting in 1954, the couple published Ibérica: por la Libertad. The magazine was one of the most important publications among Spanish moderates living in exile. It only closed in 1974. It served to pressure the US Government to end its ties to Franco, even as the US sought to strengthen to combat the perceived communist threat.

== Historical memory ==
Historical memory of LGBT people has often focused much more on gay men and the transgender community than around women more generally and lesbians specifically. This did not occur by accident, but by design as traditional gender norms in Spain always emphasized men as being more important than women. Consequently, historical memory focused on telling the stories of gay men first.

The Association for the Recovery of Historical Memory was founded in 2000 by Spanish journalist Emilio Silva after he successfully located the remains of his grandfather and eleven others in a roadside ditch. Starting in 2002, he began lobbying for historical memory to become law, which it did in 2007 with the support of the Zapatero government as La Ley de Memoria Histórica. It did not overturn Law 46/1977 and Pacto de Olvido that provided amnesty for members of the Franco regime. By law, victims existed but perpetrators did not.

One aspect of historical memory has involved identifying the bones of LGBT people killed during the Civil War. This is questioned by some, who do not understand how finding and identifying the bones of Francoist victims will assist Spaniards in resolving their complicated past. For many families of LGBT people, identifying remains is important because it is all they have of their family member. They do not have any larger legacy.

Lesbian stories are harder to find as gay men had much more visibility as a result of more brutal punishment by the Franco regime. Lesbians, benefiting from lower visibility as a means to avoid repression, have a much harder history to document in the Civil War period. According to documentary film maker Andrea Weiss, historical memory requires people first know stories about people before they can be remembered. While broad strokes are known, many of the individual stories are lost or forgotten so they cannot be remembered. It makes it impossible to understand the level of suffering endured by Spain's LGBT community during the Civil War.
