= Lesbians in the Spanish democratic transition period =

Lesbians in the Spanish democratic transition period (1975–1982) experienced an increase in civil rights compared to Francoist rule, including the 1978 repeal of a national law criminalizing homosexuality. Following the death of Francisco Franco in 1975, the societal attitude towards homosexuals was repressive. The transition brought forth changes but it was a slow process. Homosexuality was illegal under Franco's regime. During the transition, there was an initial sense of liberalization and greater freedom of expression. Societal attitudes towards homosexuality were ignored in the beginning portion of the transition, but there was no recognition of same-sex relations when it came to legal terms. It was not until the late 20th and 21st century that Spain saw significant progress in LGBTQ+ rights. Legal reforms and social movements gradually led to decriminalization of homosexuality, and later the recognition of same-sex marriage.

== Background ==
Lesbians came into this period after having been erased or ignored by the Franco regime. Officially, lesbianism did not exist in Francoist Spain. Their history during this earlier period was largely not written and their cultural contributions during the Francoist period were not recognized. In some cases, histories of homosexuality in the earlier period and during this period do not include lesbians because they treat them as if lesbians did not exist as homosexuals and gay men were the only homosexuals. When homosexuality was thought of during the period, the only thing that came to mind were gay men. Women, including subgroups of women such as lesbians, came into the transition period as a marginalized group. They had been victims of police harassment during the Franco period. Globally in this period, lesbians found themselves feeling doubly displaced; they often found the gay and trans liberation movement deeply misogynistic and patriarchal, while at the same time feeling like the feminism was ignoring them and their needs as women. This situation led to the growth of lesbian feminism and lesbian separatist movements.

Mujeres Lesbianas written by Victoria Sau and later edited by Anabel Gonzales published in 1979 was the only domestic history of lesbianism written in the transition period.

== Lesbian political and legal situation ==
An independent history of lesbianism as a political movement in Spain had not begun until 1975, as lesbian voices had been intentionally silenced prior to this. This late emergence meant that lesbians had to independently define themselves both inside the established feminist movement, and the gay and transgender movement, at a time when the Spanish society as a whole and the movements were undergoing major stresses as a result of the death of Franco. Despite this, lesbianism as a political movement still maintained a low profile, with a limited voice as part of broader discussions. Politically, lesbians in the immediate post-Franco Spain were often nothing more than supporters of their more vocal and visible male counterparts because of greater past gay male visibility and continuing patriarchy. Some radical feminists in this period would choose lesbianism as a form of exerting control over their sexuality that had been repressed by the Franco regime. There were arguments at the time over the way to be both a feminist and a lesbian. The lesbian political movement at the time largely concluded that lesbian sexuality "did not have to be soft or aggressive, nor follow any feminist or feminine pattern."

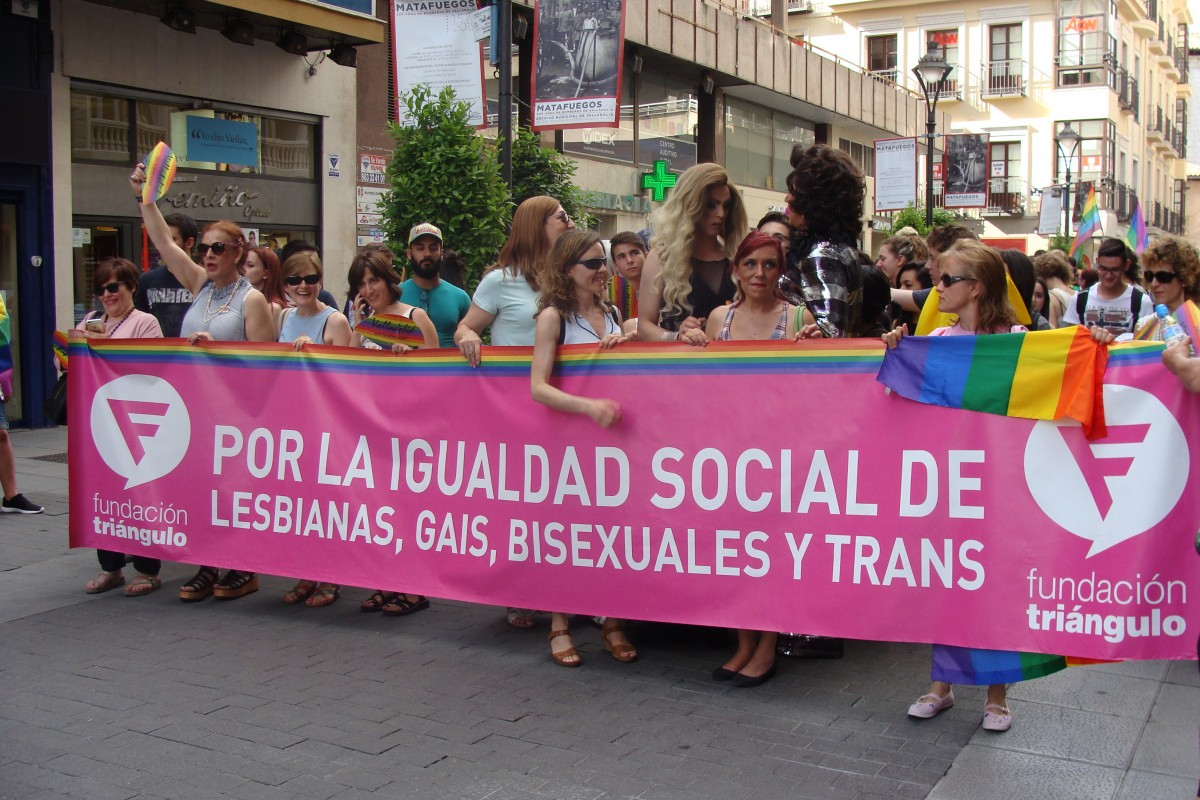
A contemporary protest led by Fundación Triángulo.

The Women's Area of the Fundación Triángulo de Madrid has explained the invisibility of lesbians in this and other periods as, "A gay man has always been able to move to another place, seeking to live his identity in freedom. While a lesbian woman stayed near her house. There are always parents, brothers or children to take care of and those who do not disappoint ". Rocio Jimenez explained this further, saying, "And that's how lesbians have developed since invisibility, at the expense of that scarlet letter that a man has never had to deal with." According to Mexican feminist Gloria Careaga, feminism often "moves away from aspects such as sexuality and intimate life to focus on the social and the political." Rocío González of Fundación Triángulo said that feminists feared the "contagion of stigma" and disassociated themselves from lesbians.

Spanish lesbians in this period tend to be involved in party politics with Izquierda Unida (United Left) or PSOE. Lesbians were likely to be involved in these parties less because the parties supported lesbian rights, but more because they otherwise tended to align with their general political views. As time progressed, these parties tended to align more closely with lesbian political goals.

Lesbians first became active politically through the feminist movement and feminist collectives. This was largely because when they had attempted to join homosexual collectives, the specific needs of lesbians were often relegated to the sidelines as less important. There was no such barrier in the feminist movement. This alignment with feminist created the concept of "political lesbian" in Spain. One area which caused lesbians to be sidelined was the male homosexual focus on AIDS, which had a much smaller impact on the lesbian community. At the same time, later feminist and gay male focused research on this period ignored lesbian contributions to the feminist movement. The impact of this is research in this period on LGBTQ+ communities often is absent a gender perspective on the LGBTQ+ rights movement. Lesbian experiences disappear from both histories. Spanish lesbianism differs from lesbianism in the United States in that lesbians retain a unique political and social identity. In the United States, lesbianism as an identity has largely been subsumed by a broader LGBTQ+ movement that removed gender and sex classifications, which then used a larger group identity with its own economic power employed to support their causes.

Lesbians were at risk of imprisonment during this period because of their orientation. It was common that families of lesbians disapproved, and conversion therapy with the use of electroshock treatment was used on occasion. Some women died within a few years of being given electroshock treatment. This sort of conversion therapy and problems with family estrangement would continue on into the Spanish transition to democracy. For many lesbians, it was a tough choice of which was worse: prison, or mental institutions where this conversion therapy took place. In addition to the threat of conversion therapy, lesbians had to worry about other aspects of their family discovering their orientation. This included being disowned by their family or being assaulted by family members because of their orientation.

During the transition period that preceded the González government, culturally and politically there was a hold over from the Franco regime in terms of the legal status and cultural attitudes towards gays and lesbians from the Franco period. Lesbians and gays were still legally prosecuted by the government in this period. The police also continued persecution of lesbian, gay and transsexual individuals. Lesbians escaped the worst of this though, as much of the focus of persecution continued to be on gay men. This led many lesbians and gays to not want to be politically engaged with the transition process. One of the most important lesbian and gay political organizations in the transition period was the Movimiento Español de Liberación Homosexual (MELH).

Col·lectiu de Lesbianes de Barcelona issued a statement in 1978 that said of their need to organize as lesbians, "It is therefore necessary that our voice be heard to unveil and re-veil aspects of our reality as women and claim our difference as lesbians."

Tensions between gays and lesbians led to the creation in 1981 of the Colectivo de Feminsitas Lesbianas de Madrid (CFLM), and the Grupo de Acción por al Liberación Homosexual (GALHO), which was somewhat less radical than the Frente de Liberación Homosexual de Castilla (FLHOC). This group was the first lesbian organization in Madrid. In 1979, the first Jornadas about lesbians took place. In 1983, the first Jornadas Lesbianas took place, focusing on lesbian sexuality. These came out of the First Encounter of Lesbian Feminists of Spain and the creation of the CFLM. The Jornadas of 1983 would mark the formal start of an organized lesbian political movement in Spain. Despite external tensions, politically active lesbians faced fewer issues around internal dissent about ideology than their male counterparts. Shared experiences during the Franco regime acted as a social and political glue that bound them together strongly. They often found themselves politically situated among radical feminists of the period. Politically, lesbians and their gay male counterparts would continue to be separate through the final part of the transition period in 1985 and remain separated until the early 1990s when marriage equality became a goal of many in the broader LG movement. (Note: Unlike in some other countries, the concept of civil partnerships was never widely discussed in Spain as an alternative to marriage. This was in part because LG activists were insistent from the onset of the conversation that they demanded full equality under the law. While Partido Popular briefly considered the concept in 1997 and 2002, the LGB activists's political partner of PSOE understood the community was willing to make the sacrifices necessary to achieve full legal marriage equality. The LGB community's desire for full marriage equality was in part a response to what the realization of lesser legal partnerships under Partido Popular would actually mean and how they would be implemented. They feared that legally it could actually mean merely cohabitation.)

=== Movimiento español de liberación homosexual (MELH – Spanish Homosexual Liberation Movement) ===
Agrupación Homófila para la Igualdad Sexual (AGHOIS), later renamed Movimiento Español de Liberación Homosexual (MELH) in 1975, was created in 1910 as a liberation movement for homosexuals. The MELH was one of the pioneering LGBTQ+ rights organizations in Spain during the late 1970s. They were there for the immediate aftermath of Francisco Franco's dictatorship.The purpose of the group was to influence the Church, arts, medicine, law, sociology and the press to change their stereotypical views about homosexuality and combat negative indoctrination which said homosexuality was evil. The Barcelona based group kept meetings to eight people or fewer in order to avoid attracting attention from the government. They felt compelled to start organizing in response to the 1970 Ley de peligrosidad y rehabilitación social. Their work dismayed other members of the LGBTQ+ community as they believed it entailed too much risk without any substantial reward. They started publishing an eponymous newsletter of the same name in 1972.

The group played a crucial role when it came to advocating for Gay rights, visibility, and social acceptance in a time, when specifically lesbians, were dismissed or largely marginalized in Spanish society. The secrecy was necessary due to the oppressive laws and social stigma against homosexuality. The organization set out to fight for legal reforms and challenge society's view towards LGBTQ+ individuals. Their first course of action was writing letters from Paris in order to fight for lesbian and gay rights.

Despite operating in secret and hiding from the hostile environment, MELH engaged in various forms of activism. They organized public protests, published newsletters and pamphlets fighting for gay rights, and campaigned for the decriminalization of homosexuality. They aimed to educate the entire society of Spain about the rights and struggles of gay individuals in order to promote a more inclusive and accepting Spain. They faced significant challenges along the way however as a result of social and legal constraints. Despite these challenges, they laid the foundation for future groups and their movements. They had a massive impact on the gradual shift to a more accepting society.

=== Legal status ===
Between 1970 and 1979, there were over 3,600 police cases opened to investigate people for violating the 1970 Law on dangerousness and social rehabilitation. The law replaced the Law of Vagrants and Criminals (ley de vagos y maleantes) which was established in 1933. The 1970 Law sought to punish "antisocial" members of society such as beggars, vandals, drug traffickers, pornographers, prostitutes, pimps and illegal immigrants. The Law placed homosexuals in this category.

In 1978 and 1979, some changes were made to the 1970 Law on dangerousness and social rehabilitation, including the reference to homosexuality.In an article by Jordi M. Monferrer Tomás, he writes about the oppressive nature of the Law during the Francoist regime and the imprisoning of homosexuals whose actions were deemed illegal. There was a concept of double or triple incrimination for specific behaviors that Tomás talks about with the utilization of various legal reasons for imprisonment.

It was not until later, in 1980, when homosexual organizations were able to be legally recognized for the first time.

=== Broader LG political movement ===
Barcelona was at the forefront of some early Spanish LG activism in the last days of the regime and the transition. Broader Spanish homosexual liberation movements during the 1970s were closer to the French movement, where personal and sexual liberation were perceived as necessary goals towards gays and lesbians developing a new social consciousness that would lead to a social revolution. It differed from American and British activists who were keen to develop political connections and change the legal status for members of the LG community, while maintaining links to explicitly leftist organizations.

In the transition period, gay men, lesbians and women were often lumped together as interest groups or minority groups. This institutional approach during the transition to these communities impacted how they organized, self-identified and what demands these groups made. The first major push by the broader homosexual rights movement was the decriminalization of homosexuality, which occurred in Spain in 1978.

Following the achievements involving changes to the law to decriminalize homosexuality in the late 1970s following the death of Franco and transition to democracy, much of the GL activist structure was dismantled as the immediate needs in the transition period were perceived as having been accomplished. Consequently, the community also began to fracture along ideological grounds, particularly among gay liberationists.

The Royal Decree Law of July 1976 and the Amnesty Law of 1977 had little impact on the mostly male homosexual population in prison for being homosexuals as they were not considered political prisoners. In 1978, 1970 Ley sobre peligrosidad y rehabilitación social. was removed from the Spanish criminal code, effectively decriminalizing same-sex sexual relations. Again in 1978, the government of Barcelona banned LGBTQ+ activists from marching in the streets. LGBTQ+ activists, including lesbians, defied this pan to march in Las Ramblas. Because of political connections of LGBTQ+ activists at that time, they were joined by Catalan Communists, Socialists, Catalan nationalists, feminists and labor union members.

Guerrilleros of the Great Gay Generation and FULIGEC were two right-wing gay groups in the Canary Islands, both coming out of Las Palmas. What FULIGEC stood for was never referenced. The organization had two prominent representatives, a gay man and a lesbian, but largely remained anonymous, explaining it, "We know what we want and we fight to rescue this hypocritical society the rights that correspond to us. We do a mentalizing work, do you understand? You have to educate yourself first. That's why we go from room to room, from club to club. We talk, we talk a lot. We have to start, but with base. Nothing more.

The International Lesbian, Gay, Bisexual, Trans and Intersex Association (ILGA) was founded in Coventry, United Kingdom in 1978. The name originally did not include Lesbian because no lesbians were present at its formation. From 4 to 7 April 1980, the 2nd IGA World Conference was hosted in Barcelona by Grup en Lluita per l’Alliberament de la Lesbiana (GLAL) and Front d’Alliberament Gai de Catalunya (FAGC). This international meeting saw a large increase in the number of women participating and led to the creation of the women's secretariat, the International Lesbian Information Service (ILIS). Women participants at the meeting rejected a name change to include the word lesbian because they felt it would create a perception of gender division within the gay rights movement. Instead, they changed the name to “International Association of Gay Women and Men” at the plenary session. The meeting also discussed the Spanish government's refusal to recognize the two organizations involved in making the conference happen.

The International Lesbian, Gay, Bisexual, Trans and Intersex Association (ILGA) was founded in Coventry, United Kingdom in 1978. The name originally did not include Lesbian because no lesbians were present at its formation. From 4 to 7 April 1980, the 2nd IGA World Conference was hosted in Barcelona by Grup en Lluita per l’Alliberament de la Lesbiana (GLAL) and Front d’Alliberament Gai de Catalunya (FAGC). This international meeting saw a large increase in the number of women participating and led to the creation of the women's secretariat, the International Lesbian Information Service (ILIS). Women participants at the meeting rejected a name change to include the word lesbian because they felt it would create a perception of gender division within the gay rights movement. Instead, they changed the name to “International Association of Gay Women and Men” at the plenary session. The meeting also discussed the Spanish government's refusal to recognize the two organizations involved in making the conference happen.

=== Broader feminist movement ===
Anglo-Saxon, Scandinavian and Dutch feminism have all evolved during previous generations to become something of an outsider driven campaign for recognition and rights to a more institutionalized form over time and was recognized as a movement called State feminism. This incarnation had largely been in place by the time Spain reached the democratic transition period in 1976. Spanish feminism, freed from the constraints of the dictatorship, immediately began a process of trying to convert to state feminism through the use of leftist political parties like PSOE and forging alliances with trade unions. Some of these institutional feminists, supported by men in power, took their lead from feminist political ideologies coming out of other Western European countries; they were often removed from the feminism being embraced by a younger generation of Spanish feminist who were responding to specific needs they saw in Spanish society. Lesbianism and specifically radical lesbianism would play an important role in the feminist movement at this time. Importantly though, these radical lesbians and feminist movements were cognizant of the context in which they existed, serving to inform them about patriarchal Spanish systems during the dictatorship and how various elements of society would respond to their needs. These lesbian and feminist communities though were not always united, would frequently leak information to try to damage each other and would have fissures leading to groups of women splitting off to form new groups.

Lesbians were involved with first Jornades Catalanes de la Dona in 1976. Some came into these Jornadas via the Moviment Comunista de Catalunya. In the Basque Country, the Colectivos de Lesbianas Feministas assisted in supporting the Asambleas de Mujeres in writing their 12 point platform around women's rights that they wanted to see in a democratic Spain. Lesbianism and feminism intersected in this period. There were tensions in this relationship. During the mid and late-1970s, lesbian Gretel Ammann played a big role in helping define difference feminism in Catalonia and consequently Spain more broadly.

=== Radical feminism and lesbian separatism ===
Gretel Ammann, Dolors Majoral and two others were influential in starting the radical feminist movement and lesbian separatist movement in Spain in Barcelona starting in 1980 through their involvement with Casa de la Dona on Carrer del Cardenal Casañas.

Lesbian separatism drew ideologically from difference feminism, but went further because the feminist movement did not provide lesbians with enough to meet their political demands and desires; they wanted something exclusively for lesbians and to not borrow from models by other groups.

=== European lesbian political and legal efforts ===
On 9 October 1979, the Council of Europe took the first steps in providing moral and legal protections go lesbians and gays when a proposal was made to the Commission fo amend Article 14 of the Convention on Human Rights to add sexual orientation as a protected class from discrimination.

In 1981, the Council of Europe passed Resolution 756. That same year, the European Parliamentary Assembly passed Recommendation 934. These represented the first steps by the now European Union to combat discrimination against homosexuals in the block, making the fight against homophobia part of the European Commission's political agenda. During the early part of the 1980s, the European Court of Justice supported the punishment of two people of the same sex engaging in sexual acts. It was not until the mid-1980s that the Court's opinion would change, claiming persecution of people engaged in consensual sex acts with people of the same sex were an invasion of privacy.

== Culture ==
Lesbians, as a group and a culture, continued to be largely ignored by Spanish society compared to gay men. They remained rather invisible. Knowledge about lesbians from this period does not come from the same sources about Spanish gay men of the period. One of the reasons that lesbians continued to be invisible in this period is that they are less easily recognizable than gay men as they are generally first identified as women.

Even though lesbians were given more freedom following the death of Franco, lesbian culture continued to be mostly invisible to the larger Spanish populace well into the 1990s, being referred to as the hidden homosexuality (Spanish: una homosexualidad oculta). Gay men were out of the closet, but lesbians continued to be marginalized and hidden. In the book titled, Queer Transitions in Contemporary Spanish Culture, author Gema Perez-Sanchez states, "Franco's dictatorship sought both to codify and to contain male homosexuals, while it tended to erase or to doubt the existence of actual lesbians... silence itself—while dangerous and limiting in some contexts—can, in other contexts, convey political meaning, uncover hidden emotions, and point to untold stories."

Lesbian culture during the transition period can be depicted as a multifaceted role of culture serving as a tool for both preserving and challenging societal norms and power structures. María del Mar Alberca García indicates that, "[t]he interpretation of culture as a vehicle of expression and dissemination of ideas always has two sides. On one hand, . . . it is a means to disseminate the complex system of ideas and attitudes that helps to consolidate the political project of the ruling group in power. On the other, the cultural scene is a space of struggle for the representation of minorities who claim the legitimacy of an alternative culture, trying to expose the contradictions of the dominant system. Of both uses [of culture]—one that tends towards preservation and another that tends towards change or rupture— we have good examples in the Spanish culture of the twentieth century." Culture, whether through art, language, or traditions, serves as a channel to convey and spread ideas. Specific to the transition period, it is used as a way to reinforce power dynamics and maintain control. The quote suggests that culture is used to solidify their political agenda. At the same time, culture serves as a method for marginalized groups to fight. The lesbians seek representation and legitimacy for their own culture and challenge these dominant narratives in order to not be invisible. By including this duality, it highlights that the government leans towards preservation while the lesbians want change by challenging the existing norms in order to have a voice.

During the Franco period, Chueca was a working-class neighborhood that was also home to many working class Spanish prostitutes. The area would later transform into one of the most important hubs of radical leftist Spanish thinking and be an intrinsic part of Madrileño LGBTQ+ identity. Spain is made up of multiple subcultures including Catalan, Basque and Castilian. These subcultures lead to a situation where Spanish lesbian culture is not unified.

Women had received electroshock therapy in the last days of Franco continued to suffer the consequences of this conversion therapy in this period. There was an institution created for the incarceration of homosexuals. The institution was called "Heulva's Center for Homosexuals" and was sued to implement the government's reeducation system, which included electroshock. It became a threat to lesbians and gays of Spain as they were forced to fear for their physical and psychological well-being.

The Basque nationalist government promoted the story of Basque lesbian soldier in the Americas Katalin Erauso during the late 1970s and 1980s. Lesbians of this period often tried to subvert accepted sexual identities and gender roles. Lesbianism was about challenging heterosexual assumptions of accepted female behavior. Lesbian was a word subject to censorship during much of the transition period, so lesbians found workarounds like identifying as feminist collectives. Hiding this way benefited lesbians in the transition period as it helped them avoid reprisals, rape, corrective rape, arrest by the police and internment that still occasionally happened to gay men.

=== Sexuality and Discrimination ===
For lesbians in the late transition period, the act of sex became about ongoing negotiations on personal sexual pleasure as lesbian identity and culture were bound together with the concept of lesbians being able to express their own sexuality and sexual needs. Masculine women in this period were often accused of being lesbians because of their subversion of traditional Spanish gender norms. This existed despite the fact that not all Spanish lesbians are masculine, nor were all masculine women lesbians.

For politically active lesbians during the late stages of the transition, a key component of their activism was about lesbian sexuality and the ability to express it freely, despite stereotypes that suggested women, and lesbians in particular, were less interested in sex because there is nothing after sex once the act of penetration is removed. For lesbians of this period, the act of sex became about ongoing negotiations on personal sexual pleasure.

=== Pride (Spanish: Orgullo) ===
The first major gay and lesbian demonstration in the post-Franco period took place in Barcelona on 26 June 1977 on Las Ramblas, attended by around 4,000 to 5,000 people including lesbians, gays, bisexuals and transgender people. Among their chants was "We are not afraid, we exist." (Catalan: Nosaltres no tenim por, nosaltres som). The major call at this demonstration was for amnesty for sexual crimes and repeal of the Law of Hazard and Social Rehabilitation. Early in the organizing process, lesbians got feminist organizations and neighborhood groups to agree to support them. Lesbian militant feminist Empar Pineda also got local communists on board as at the time she was the head of the Communist Movement.

Ca la Dona member Mercè Otero said of this first match, "It was a very unitary manifestation and you felt very accompanied, and it is worth remembering it even if you do one each year."

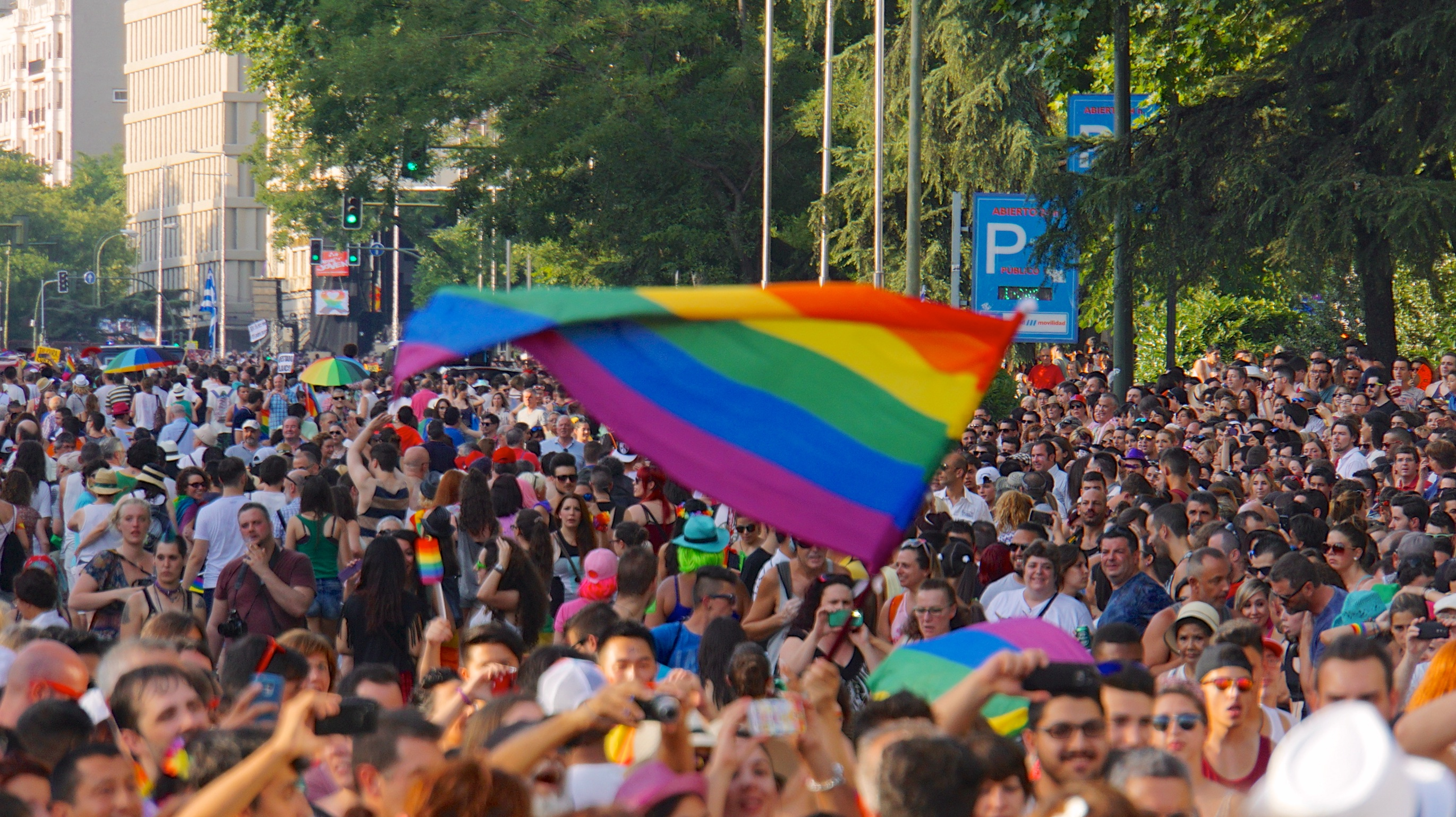
Contemporary Pride Parade in Madrid

Front d'Alliberament Gai de Catalunya was form in 1975 in Barcelona, and two years later, in 1977, would host the first Spanish Gay Pride march which saw participation from lesbians, politicians and union members. This was the first LGBT political event in the country's history at a time when such protests were still illegal. 4,000 people took part, and lesbian marchers chanted, "Behind the windows, there are lesbians!" Lesbian participants included Maria Giralt.

A year later, in 1978, Madrid would hold its first Pride event. It would continue to be held every year, except in 1980 when it was banned from taking place.

== Organizations ==
The Homosexual Association for Social Equality (AGHOIS) was created largely by gay men in Barcelona before the death of Franco. It would influence other homosexual activists in the early 1970s in cities like Valencia, Mallorca, Madrid, Malaga, Zaragoza, Santiago de Compostela, Bilbao. It was also influential with the founders of Spanish Movement for Homosexual Liberation (MELH), which was established in 1972 and largely led by male homosexuals.

Front d'Alliberament Gai de Catalunya (FAGC) was founded at the end of 1975. It would play an important role during the transition. In 1978, FAGC had its first split with the creation of Col·lectius per l'Alliberament Gai (CCAG). This split also resulted in many lesbians leaving FAGC and joining militant feminist groups instead.

Colectivo de Lesbianas del FAHPV was formed in 1977 in Valencia, and were affiliated with Front d’Alliberament Homosexual del País Valencià until February 1978. They later joined the Colectivos de Lesbianas Feministas.

The First Encounter of Lesbian Feminists of Spain took place in June 1980. It was out of this that the Lesbian Feminist Collective of Madrid (Spanish: Colectivo de Feministas Lesbianas de Madrid) was founded in January 1981. It was the first lesbian organization in Madrid. They had issues with their name because the word lesbian was often subjected to censorship, and there were possible legal consequences for promoting lesbian as a result of the 1970 law not being totally amended at that time. To protect themselves and to be able to legally associated, they had to go by the name Women's Collective for Sexual Liberation (Spanish: Colectivo de Mujeres para la liberación sexual). They also used CFLM to avoid running afoul of censorship around the word lesbian.

Coordinaadora Gai-Lesbiana was founded in 1980 in Barcelona. Women in the group worked with gays, Christians and university students to advance lesbian and gay rights. Colectivo Canario de Liberación de la Mujer Lesbiana was founded in 1980 in Gran Canaria.

The first lesbian organization, Grup de Lluita per l'Alliberament de la Dona, in Spain would not be founded until 1979 in Barcelona. Despite this, lesbians would continue to maintain a lower profile in the LGBTQ+ community in Spain than their gay male peers. When not maintaining a lower profile, they were actively ignored by their male peers as completely unimportant.

The first lesbian organization in Biscay was formed in 1979 as a group within EHGAM as Emakumearen Sexual Askpenerako Mugimendua (ESAM). They wanted to work towards women's sexual freedom and liberation for lesbians. They produced the Dossier Lesbianismo, which explained their goals. They took a position that all women were latent bisexuals and that sexual orientation identity was not fixed. They did not believe in the usage of terms like man, woman, lesbian or homosexual. Lesbians organized in Irun by 1982 around EHGAM.

== Media ==
=== Literature ===
Spanish lesbian literature has three main periods. The first is from 1964 to 1975, during the last years of the Franco regime. The second is the transition period of 1975 to 1985. The last period was from 1985 to the present. Time of the Cherries (Spanish: Tiempo de cerezas) by Montserret Roig in 1976 is an example of the cliche of students in an all girls school having lesbian sexual experiences.

During the 1960s, Ester Tusquets and her brother Oscar were the owners and influential forces behind the left leaning antidictatorial publisher Editorial Lumen. Starting in 1968, following the departure of Oscar, the publisher began publishing works by gay men, women in general and lesbians specifically, along with foreign works, cultural theory texts and children's stories. The Same Sea as Every Summer (Spanish: El mismo mar de todos los veranos) was published by Tusquets in 1978, while Love is a Solitary Game (Spanish: El amor es un juego solitario) was published a year later and the final book of her trilogy, Stranded (Spanish: Varada tas el último naufragio) was published in 1980. These works were part of an important lesbian political literary criticism of the stresses faced by lesbians in try to exist in a heterosexist society. They were published in the same period as Carmen Riera's 1980 A Woman's Word (Spanish: Palabra de mujer), another important work in the lesbian literary canon of the period. The Violet Hour (Spanish: La hora violeta) by Montserrat Roig published in 1980 was one of the more important pieces of writing in the transition period in that it represented lesbian sexuality as a commitment to other women.

During the immediate post-Franco period, Barcelona was a major literary hub for Spain's lesbian literary community. Writers in the city included Marta Pesarrodona, Ana María Moix, Carme Riera and Montserrat Roig.

The first major out lesbian writer was Andrea Luca. Gloria Fuertes, Ana María Moix, Ana Rosetti, Ester Tusquets, Carme Riera, Elana Fortún and Isabel Franc were all in the closet during the Franco regime or the first stages of the transition. Lesbian writers did not start to come out until the 1990s. Most of the lesbian literary body in this period came from outside Madrid and Castile, with many being multi-lingual. Catalonia produced Riera, Roig and Laforet. Galicia produced Mayoral. Extebarria was a Basque from Valencia.

Despite the liberalization of Spanish society in the immediate transition period, literature featuring lesbian characters tended to conform to historical type of being secondary figures and representing insubordination against oppressive heteronormative societal norms. While gay men were the more visible homosexuals in the Franco and transition period, women writers would be at the forefront of normalizing homosexuality in literature for the average Spanish reader in the final Franco years and first years of the transition. Women writers like Ester Tusquets were the first to break taboo subjects like female desire. Political feminism that saw lesbianism as a natural endpoint for women began to become a bigger theme in some feminist works of this period.

Ana María Moix was one of the most important lesbian poets of the Spanish democratic transition period. During the Francoist period, she had engaged in some degree of self-censorship while writing about women to not be explicit in her lesbian oriented themes and needed to rely on subtext. One example of such self-censorship occurred in Dangerous Virtues (Spanish: Las virtudes peligrosas). Her writing in this period adhered more to an ideology that would later become known as queer theory.

Poetry would be important in this period, more important for the gay and lesbian community that other parts of the Spanish population.

=== Art and Books ===
Lesbian art and artists in this period are largely unknown. This is a result of a number of factors, including that there has been little institutional support and funding to research the topic within the broader arts community.

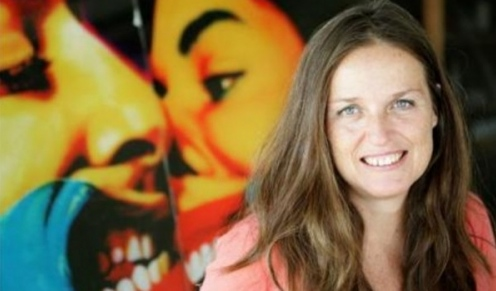
Ouka Leele posing with some of her artwork that challenges societal norms

Mujeres Lesbianas written by Victoria Sau and later edited by Anabel Gonzales which was published in 1979, was the only domestic history of lesbianism written in the transition period. An artist under the alias, Ouka Leele, was a photographer and artist during the transition period. Most of her work focused on the la movida movement, but she encapsulated the spirit of the cultural and social changes in Spain in her work. Her work embraced diversity, freedom of expression, and challenged societal norms, all of which were found during the lesbian movement. Her work contributed to a more open and accepting environment for lesbians. Her work contributed to a more open and accepting environment for lesbians. Her work helped to foster discussions and represent different identities including lesbian experiences.

=== Movies ===
Homosexuality began to be addressed in a more open and liberal manner in Spanish films starting in the 1970s. Most of the important works were produced by men and featured male homosexual characters. Basque Eloy de la Iglesia was an important film director of this type in this era. Much of the cinematography featuring lesbian characters or lesbian themes in this period were created by men, and often by gay men. The nature of gay men's depictions of lesbians in films created some fractures in the feminist movement of the time with the emerging homosexual rights community, especially since men had fewer limits placed on them and more resources available to them when it came to creating film.

The Real Decreto of 1977 led to the creation of the Spanish S-rating for films “whose content or theme could damage the spectator's sensibility”. This rating primarily impacted lesbian erotic films. This had a big impact on films depicting lesbian eroticism because it largely ended censorship in the newly democratic Spain and allowed for the first time films that explicitly featured erotic content. It also led to many depictions of lesbians on screens in different ways, and allowed for the depictions of previously censored themes like pre-marital sex, adultery and abortion.

In June 1978, an article in Cineinforme said, “our cinemas are full of lesbians, perverts, bestiality ... producers and distributors are eager to find new films with promising titles such as My Sister, My Love.” The weekend that the article was published, seven of the nine Spanish movies released in theaters were erotic. Lesbian erotic movies or movies with lesbian erotic content from this period include Sex Calls (Spanish: La llamada del sexo) (Tulio Demichelli 1976), Jill (Enrique Guevara, 1977), A Crazy and Sexy Extravaganza (Spanish: Una loca extravagancia Sexy) (Enrique Guevara, 1977), Sexual Plot (Spanish: Trampa sexual) (1977), The Last Sin of the Bourgeoisie (Spanish: El último pecado de la burguesía) (1978), A Nun's Love Letters (Spanish: Cartas de amor de una monja) (1978), Honey, What Have You Done to Me? (Spanish: Cariño mío, ¿qué me has echo?) (1979), Venus of Fire (Spanish: Venus de fuego) (Germán Lorente,1979), Stella's Crazy Holidays (Spanish: Las locas vacaciones de Stella) (Zacarías Urbiola, 1980), The Depraved Are Exposed (Spanish: Viciosas al desnudo) (1980), Evaman, the Love Machine (Spanish: Evaman, La máquina del amor) (Antonio D’Agostino 1980), Forbidden Passion (Spanish: Pasión prohibida) (Armando de Ossorio, 1980) and South Eden (Spanish: Al sur del Edén) (Ismael González, 1981).. While these films started showing women's breasts, cunnilingus and lesbians kissing, ménage-à-trois sex and masturbation, they did not show lesbians or women more generally fully nude.

=== Magazines and fanzines ===
In 1981, Gretel Ammann created Amazonas. It was an exclusively lesbian published lesbian magazine.
