= Rampova =

Spanish artist, performer, cartoonist (1955–2021)

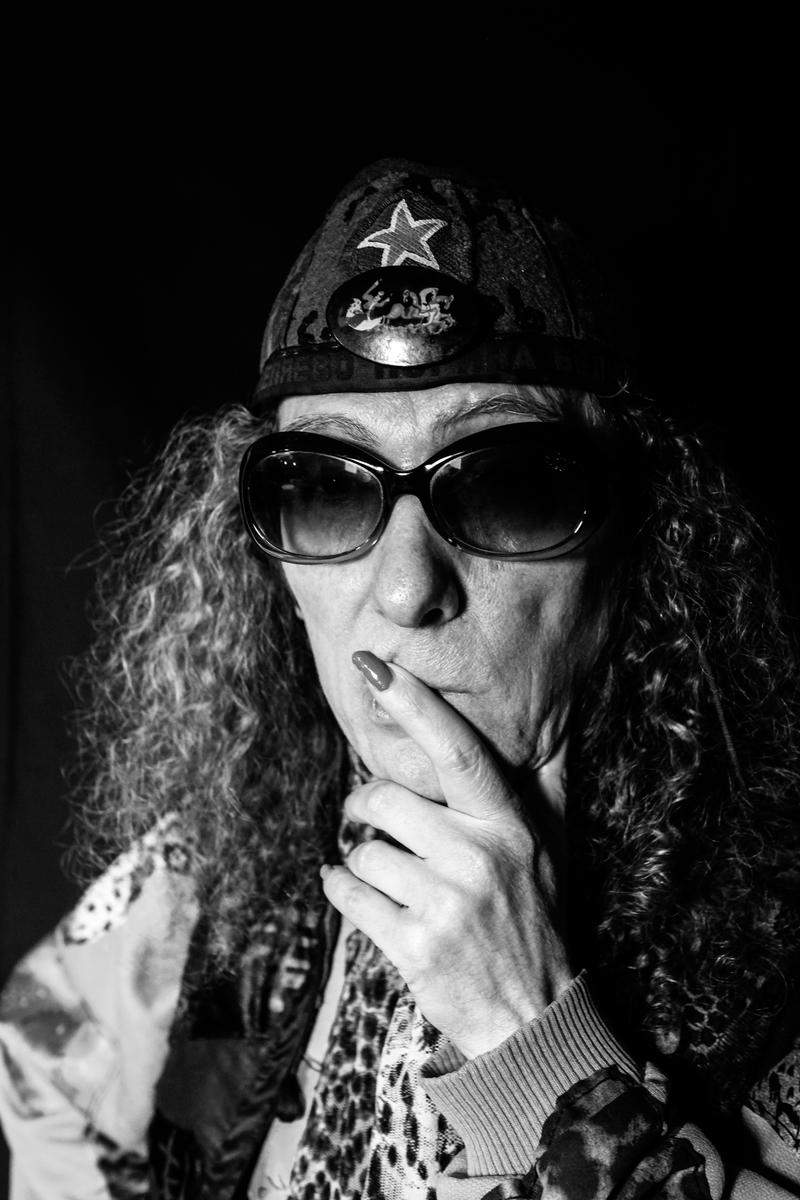
- Rampova in 2018
- Born: 29 December 1955; Beteró, Valencia, Spain
- Died: 18 July 2021 (aged 65); Valencia, Spain
- Occupations: Artist; performer; cartoonist; LGBTQ rights activist

Nastasia Rampova (29 December 1955 – 18 July 2021), (Note: She sometimes signed her name as Nastassia or Anastasia Rampova, although most sources refer to her simply as Rampova. From 1998 onwards, after the dissolution of Ploma 2, she also performed under the name Rampova Cabaret.) better known as Rampova, was a Spanish artist, trans cabaret performer and actress, cartoonist, and activist for sexual and gender liberation.

With a career spanning four decades, she was one of the leading figures of the Valencian counterculture in the 1970s and 1980s, as well as a pioneer of queer activism and gender liberation in Spain.

== Biography ==
=== Beginnings and activism ===
Rampova was born in Valencia, to a cook and a trade unionist who was persecuted and later exiled to France. From a young age, she stated that she lived her sexuality freely, despite the repressive nature of the schools. In April and October 1971, at the age of fourteen, she was imprisoned in the Modelo Prison in Valencia under the Law of Dangerousness and Social Rehabilitation, which condemned, among other things, homosexual conduct and "gender transgression". In February 1974, she was imprisoned again for the same reason, suffering severe repression and violence at the hands of authorities and prisoners. Years later, she would recount these experiences in several documentaries and books of historical memory about the Franco regime.

For five years, she worked as an administrative assistant and began studying commerce, until she was fired. Meanwhile, in 1976, she had begun her clandestine activism for libertarianism and sexual liberation as part of the Atomic Orgasm group. With the start of the transition to democracy and the subsequent explosion of social movements, she participated in various feminist, anti-NATO, and Valencian sexual liberation demonstrations. This movement had begun in an organized form with the founding in 1977 of the Front d'Alliberament Homosexual del País Valencià (FAHPV), motivated by the expulsion of the homosexual Carmelite friar Antonio Roig. In 1979, it transformed into MAS-PV, from which the following year, the Kol·lectiu per l'Alliberament Sexual (KAS), in which Rampova participated, would split. KAS advocated a more transversal approach and met at the Front d'Esquerra Nacionalista headquarters. After its dissolution in 1981, they returned to MAS-PV, now called the MAG-PV. During this period, she collaborated with Greta Guevara on various issues of Papers Gais, and created the first LGBTQ stickers in Valencia to raise funds.

=== Pluma 2 ===
From a young age, she had a great interest in music, and in particular in the figure of Marisol. As a teenager, she came into contact with the world of cinema and figures such as Marlene Dietrich and Greta Garbo, who would influence the rest of her career. Furthermore, Rampova often dressed in deliberately provocative and eccentric looks, ranging from glam aesthetics (then known as "gay rock" in Spain) to gothic inspiration and the use of crinolines and dresses in the style of The Lady of the Camellias. In 1980, she performed as the opening act for Encarnita Duclown with a satirical act under the name Marujita Nochess. That year, she also performed alongside Greta, Amadorova, Clara Bowie, and Antoni Ruiz at the Cimi's club and the Barro Literary Cabaret, with a show that mixed Weimar Republic-style cabaret, contemporary dance, and a satirical and political message.

They soon adopted the collective name Ploma 2, incorporating biting monologues written by Rampova on topics such as sexual liberation and anticlericalism, covers of glam and copla songs, and original songs with a strong provocative charge, as well as elements of audience interaction and performance art. Ploma 2 was also one of the first groups to sing about AIDS in Spain. They sporadically collaborated with Rafa Ferrando (who did VJ-ing, interspersing images of flamenco singers and gay pornography), the actress Celia Zaragoza, Teresa, Nacha, Carmen "La Grande", and, from 1983, the drag king Herminia. They performed in concert halls, pubs, universities, gay liberation movement events, and events organized by left-wing organizations (CNT, PCE, etc) and other social movements. Meanwhile, they had to face repression and beatings from neo-Nazi groups and harassment from the Brigade 26 of Valencia.

The project had established itself as a cabaret proposal (which they opposed to the less politically charged music hall) and "critical drag", with the lineup of Rampova, Greta, Clara, and Joseba. Amadorova left the group in 1982 and pursued a career as an avant-garde artist and fashion designer in Madrid, under the name La Cerillera Cósmica. In 1987, Ploma 2 rejoined her in Madrid, participating in artistic fashion shows with her designs. The group stayed in the city for a while. In the early 1990s, they came into contact with Mujercitas (Beatriz Santiago and Paloma Tabasco) and Blanca Li, for whom they performed in Simulacro (1992) with Paco Clavel and others. Ploma 2, now just as Rampova and Clara, toured as part of the all-female musical theatre group Circunstanxias, and for them Rampova wrote the play Mujeres en pie de guerra (1995).

Back in Valencia in the second half of the nineties, the duo dissolved due to Clara's illness, and Rampova performed with Juli Mekànika as the Rampova Kabaret. In 1997, she was brutally beaten by a Boixos Nois member at Sants Station, leaving her in a coma for six days and with spinal cord and neurological injuries.

=== Gore Gore Gays ===
In 2000, Rampova participated in the founding of the techno-pop and punk band Gore Gore Gays, the first musical group with openly queer lyrics in Spain. The group consisted of herself, Juli Mekànika, and Tony Trash, who would continue to lead the group in subsequent lineups. She performed with them in their first concerts and sang on the albums "GGG" (2000) and "Heteroperfecta" (2001).

=== Radio ===
In 1984, after the dissolution of MAGPV, Rampova, along with Clara and Miquel Alamar (Panotxa), founded one of the first gay radio programs in Spain, La Pinteta Rebel. The program, which ran until 1993, was broadcast on the Valencian pirate radio station Ràdio Klara. It featured news about the repression of LGBTQ people in different parts of the world, comedy sketches, and live music with provocative lyrics. The program's irreverence prompted numerous live calls and attempts at sabotage by the local far-right. Joan Lluís Molina, Jaume Carballo, and Fernando Lumbreras also participated, and they even interviewed Ana Belén and Víctor Manuel. The program preceded the founding of the Lambda in 1986, in which Panotxa and Lumbreras participated, and which would become the main collective in the region to this day, maintaining close ties with the program.

Following a warning from journalist Rafael Ventura Melià that the group behind the dossier on the Ajoblanco fallas festival had registered that name, in 1993, the program changed its name to Polster-Gai, which it retained until 1997. After Polster-Gai ended, Rampova and Clara collaborated sporadically on the La mar de gai (Radio Horta), hosted by Panotxa. Rampova also participated in programs on stations such as Radio Puça, Radio 9, and Radio Malva, and between 2015 and 2016, on the program La Gauche Divine on Radio Klara.

=== Other ===
Rampova wrote numerous texts, poems, and comics for magazines such as Ajoblanco, Perogrullo, Cartelera Turia, Papers Gais, and Infogai, with which she collaborated from 1999 to 2009. She also designed dozens of stickers that were later used by various feminist and LGBTQ groups. She also had roles in Everyone Off to Jail (1993) and the Tony Trash/Steven Sputnik underground short film trilogy that began with Viviendo en la ínfima (1993).

Her pieces (photographs, designs, comics, collages, costumes, and texts) have been exhibited in collective and individual exhibitions, and since 2018, they have been part of the Rampova Kabarett Archive at L'Armari de la Memòria of the Generalitat Valenciana.

== Works ==
=== Theater ===
==== As actress (selected) ====
- Sonría, Señor Dictador (Carmen Ruiz, 1974).
- La parada de los monstruos (Jaume Carballo, 1984) (with Ploma 2).
- Vampiresas desmadradas o los inicios de la poca vergüenza (1986) (with Ploma 2).
- Muerte y resurrección de una pasión sin razón (Sergio Claramunt, 1987–1988) (with Ploma 2).
- Simulacro (Blanca Li, 1992) (with Ploma 2).
- Matadero Club (Ignacio Dorta, 2016).

==== As author (selected) ====
- Mujeres en pie de guerra (1995) (for Circunstanxias).
- Mujeres de armas tomar (1996).

=== Music ===
==== With Clara Bowie ====
- Plumas de cisne (1998).

==== With Gore Gore Gays ====
- GGG (2000).
- Heteroperfecta (2001).

=== Radio ===
- La Pinteta Rebel (Radio Klara, 1984–1993).
- Polster-Gai (Radio Klara, 1993–1997).

=== Memoirs ===
- Kabaret Ploma 2. Socialicemos las lentejuelas (Imperdible, 2020).

== Filmography ==
=== Short films ===
- Viviendo en la ínfima (Steven Sputnik, 1993).
- Sensación de morir (Steven Sputnik, 1993).
- Mondo Bizarro (Steven Sputnik, 1995).
- El mejor amante del mundo (Verónica Cerdán, 1995).

=== Feature films ===
- Todos a la cárcel (Luis García Berlanga, 1993).
- Socialmente peligrosos (Salvador Dolz, 1998).
- Sentenciados sin juicio (Eliseo Blay, 2004).
- 40 años y un día (Salvador Dolz, 2006).
- València, t'estime (Carlos Giménez Pons, 2025).

=== Television ===
- Sin fronteras con María Laria (TVE, 1995) (performance with Circunstanxias).

== Exhibitions ==
- El Mundo de Rampova Cabaret (La Errería - House of Bent, 2009).
- Rampova Kabaret (Octubre Centre de Cultura Contemporània, 2017).
- Contracultura: resistencia, utopía y provocación (IVAM, 2020).
- ¿Soc el que semble, o semble el que soc? Rampova, obra gràfica (CC Nave 3 Ribes, 2024).
- Ni normal ni anormal: paranormal. Rampova (1957–2021), pionera queer valenciana (La Nau, 2025).

== Legacy ==
In 1998, a photographic exhibition dedicated to Ploma 2 opened at the Sala Destall in Valencia. In 2016, the installation Las ahijadas by artist William James premiered, drawing parallels between the careers of Rampova and the early 20th-century dancer and designer Natacha Rambova, from whom Rampova took her name. The piece was exhibited at Es Baluard and the Centre del Carme.

In 2020, Lourdes Santamaría's piece, Retrato de Rampova como Medusa Stardust, was exhibited at IVAM. In 2021, the Generalitat posthumously awarded Ploma 2 one of its 9 Dia de la Comunitat Valenciana cultural merit distinctions. A few months earlier, while still alive, Rampova was named "Carnavalera major" by Podem València.

In 2022, the piece TranSisters (Clara, Rampova & Me), by the artist Graham Bell Tornado, premiered in Valencia, reclaiming the legacy of Ploma 2.

== Awards and recognitions ==
- Award for best radio program for La Pinteta Rebel by the P.A.R.R.U.S. collective (1984).
- Pink triangle of the Col·lectiu Lambda (1998).
- Sexual freedom award from the Herakles Safo collective (1999).
- COGAM Pink triangle (1999).
- Recognition of the artistic career of the Association of Visual Artists of Valencia (AVVAC) (2021).

== See also ==
- Queer anarchism
