= Valencia Pride (festival) =

Annual LGBT event in Valencia, Spain

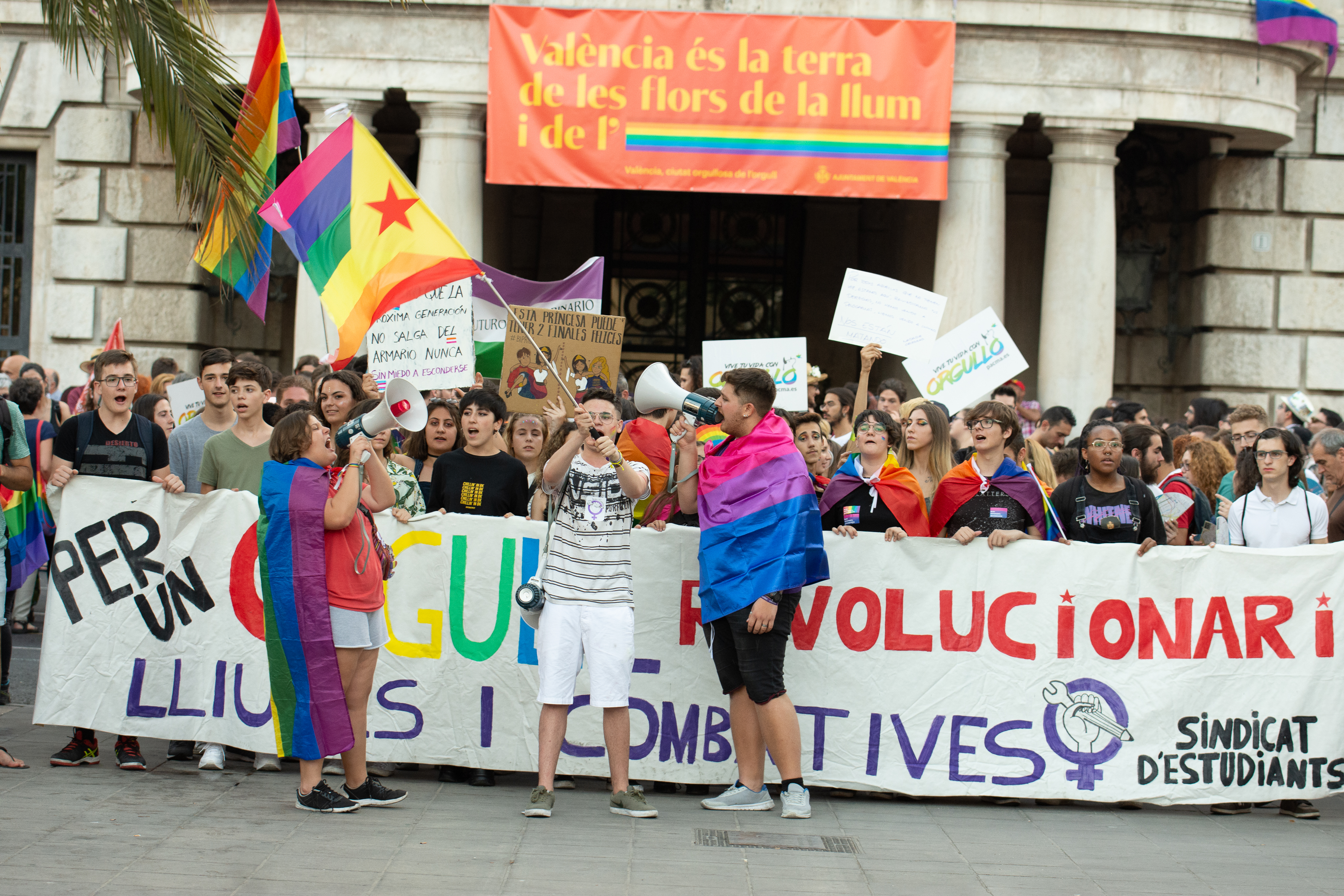
- Valencia Pride in 2019
- Native name: Orgullo de Valencia
- Date: June
- Location: Valencia
- Type: Pride festival
- Motive: International LGBT Pride Day, 28 June
- Organised by: Lambda

Valencia Pride is a pride festival celebrated in June in the Valencian Community in Spain. It is celebrated annually during the period around the International LGBT Pride Day on 28 June. The Lambda (es) collective has organized several of the marches, which have been held in the city of Valencia since 1979.

== Background and history ==
The Stonewall riots happened in the aftermath of the events that took place on 28 June 1969 at the Stonewall Inn in New York City, and is often considered to be the origin of the LGBTQ rights movement in the Western World. However, it was not until 1977, that the first march was held in Spain, which took place in Barcelona. The first such march in the Valencian Community was held in 1979, when Spain was under transition from the Francois dictatorship, an era during which homosexual practices and transsexual rights were suppressed by law and homophobia was perpetuated by Catholicism.

The first march in the Community was held on 24 June 1979 in the city of Valencia, and was convened by the Moviment d'Alliberament Sexual del País Valencià (MAS-PV) with the support of the Valencia City Council, the left parties, and various progressive social movements. Around two thousand to five thousand participants took part in the event, which took place largely in a festive atmosphere. However, there were some altercations between the people who had gathered and the members of some of the far-right groups linked to the Fuerza Nueva party.

Since then, the Valencia Pride has been held every June in the city with a different theme each year. According to figures from the organizers, more than fifteen thousand attendees gathered in 2009, though the local police cited that there were only two thousand. During the celebrations in 2015, the LGBT flag was hung from the balcony of the City Hall for the first time.In 2017, the Pride Festival took place in the Plaza del Ayuntamiento with musical performances and a street party.

In 2018, on the 39th anniversary of the first Pride march, Fani Boronat, general coordinator of Lambda, spoke against the phobia toward the LGBTQ+ community. In 2019, Valencia celebrated the 40th anniversary of the first Pride march and the 50th anniversary of the event at Stonewall. The Pride march went from Porta de la Mar to the City Hall Square. The event included museum exhibitions and a party in the Square.

In 2020, Pride events were held virtually because of the COVID-19 pandemic. As per the organizers, the 2023 edition brought together more than twenty thousand attendees, about five thousand more than the previous year, and more than seventy entities participated in the event.

In 2024, the Pride march was attended by more than 15,000 people, including political representatives such as Minister of the Interior Fernando Grande Marlaska. Marchers paraded under the slogan "For our rights, Pride and resistance." The event organizer, Lambda, canceled the traditional after party and instead protested against the policies of the PP and Vox governments.

In 2025, the Pride was held under the slogan "Ara més que mai: Orgull" (Now more than ever: Pride) and approximately 10,000 people marched. Xavi Martínez, a victim of conversion therapy for nearly five years, gave his testimony and demanded the criminalization of such practices. The new trans law being prepared by the Valencian government (PP and Vox) was also criticized on the march.

== Events ==
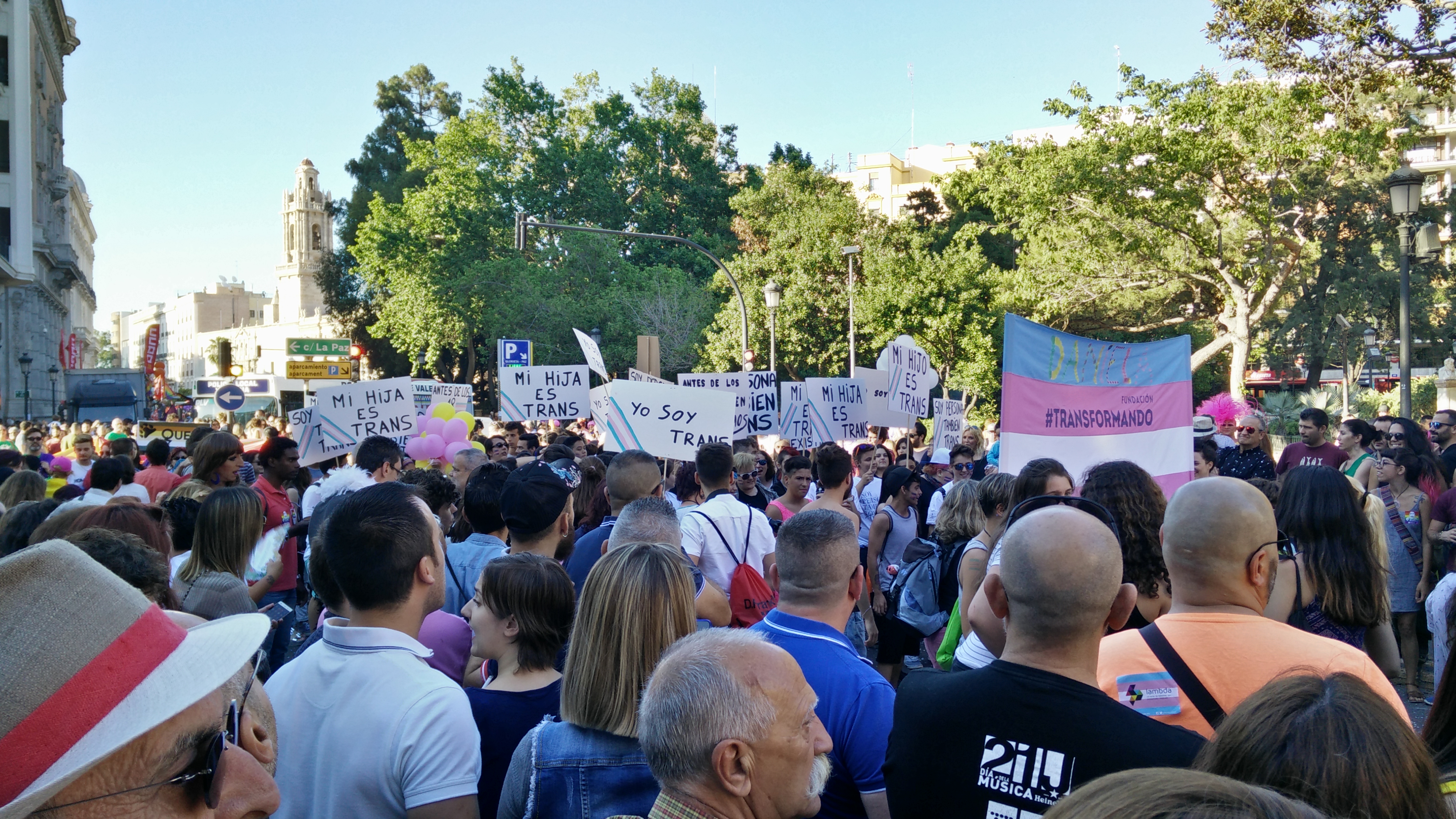
Valencia Pride in 2016

The march is held every year under a different theme. The march begins at the Puerta del Mar square and ends at the Town Hall square, where a manifesto is usually read out to the audience. In addition to the marches, events such as museum visits, film and documentary screenings, talks and other celebrations are also held. Other places that host events and marches during the festival include Alameda, Calle Colón and Plaza de la Virgen.

During the pride celebrations in 2021, the Valencian director Carlos Giménez premiered the documentary València, t'estime ("Valencia, I love you"), which describes demands of the LGBT people in the city of Valencia since the end of the 1970s, and portrays the various local collectives, people, and entities involved in the same, such as La Pinteta Rebel, the first LGBT radio program in Valencia.
