= History of homosexuality =

History of homosexuality includes:

- History of male homosexuality
- History of female homosexuality

== Additional topics ==
- Catholic church and homosexuality
- Criminalization of homosexuality
- Decriminalization of homosexuality
- Homosexuality in China
- Homosexuality in ancient Egypt
- Homosexuality in medieval Europe
- Homosexuality in ancient Greece
  - Homosexuality in the militaries of ancient Greece
- Homosexuality in India
- Homosexuality in Indonesia
- Homosexuality in Japan
- Homosexuality in Nazi Germany
  - Lesbians in Nazi Germany
- Homosexuality in pre-Columbian Peru
- Homosexuality in ancient Rome
- Sikhism and homosexuality
- Lesbians in Spain (Pre-modern Spain - Spanish Second Republic - Francoist Spain - Democratic transition)
- History of homosexuality in the United States
  - History of gay men in the United States
  - History of lesbianism in the United States

== See also ==
- History of bisexuality
- LGBTQ history
