= María Helena NG =

- Born: 1947 [?]
- Citizenship: Spain

María Helena NG (born 1947[?]) was one of only two known women to be charged with violating the Ley de Vagos y Maleantes, the 1933 law that defined homosexuality as criminal act in Spain. Arrested on 30 March 1968 at Barcelona's La Gran Cava, she was eventually convicted and sentenced to between 127 days and one year in prison, followed by a two–year mandatory ban from going to Barcelona and two years of government supervision. María Helena's case indicates that, although past and current conservative narratives challenge the existence of lesbians and gender-nonconforming women in Spain, the state was aware of them.

== Biography ==
According to prison records, as a young child, María Helena never wanted to play with dolls, nor liked playing in the kitchen. She would have her first sexual experience with another woman at the age of 12 in Montevideo. She did not like wearing women's underwear.

21-year-old María Helena was charged in Catalonia with violating the Ley de Vagos y Maleantes on 30 March 1968, with a file number of 296. She was arrested after going to the La Gran Cava, where while dressed as a man she tried to pick up a woman. Her case was brought before Judge Antonio Sabater, one of the principle authors of the first draft of the Ley de Vagos y Maleantes de 1933. The charge against her read, "She was arrested when she was in the bar La Gran Cava, located on Calle Conde del Asalto number 25 in a suspicious attitude and dressed as a man. She has no background, stating that he does not engage in any activity, living off the charities she is given and sometimes making blood donations. She says that she dresses as a man so that he can deceive women towards whom he feels an irresistible inclination." (Spanish: Fue detenida cuando se hallaba en el bar La Gran Cava sito en la calle Conde del Asalto número 25 en actitud sospechosa y vestida de hombre. Carece de antecedentes, manifestando que no se dedica a actividad alguna, viviendo de las caridades que le hacen y algunas veces haciendo donaciones de sangre. Dice que se viste de hombre para así poder engañar a las mujeres hacia las que siente una irresistible inclinación.) The act that precipitated her arrest was drinking wine at a bar while appearing in masculine clothes, violating state norms by challenging the gender norms of the period. While there are elements of transvestism in the arrest sheet, it is unclear if she was transgender.

In the sentencing decision, the court ruled, "Her clearly, defined and manifest tendency towards homosexuality, make it particularly dangerous to coexist with the young women who have received this patronage, whom she has already tried to make her homosexual practices in the few days she has been hospitalized. Such dangerousness [...] is what makes us put the aforementioned young woman at the disposal of the illustrious Special Court, especially when, to a greater extent, our rehabilitation services inform us in an absolutely negative sense as regards the possibility of reeducation of this young woman, given her age and characteristics." (Spanish: “Su clara, definida y manifiesta tendencia a la homosexualidad, la hacen particularmente peligrosa para convivir con las jóvenes acogidas a este patronato, a las que ya ha pretendido hacer objeto de sus prácticas homosexuales en los escasos días que lleva internada. Tal peligrosidad […] es lo que nos hace poner a la referida joven a disposición de ese Ilmo. Juzgado Especial, máxime, cuando, a mayor abundamiento, nuestros servicios de readaptación nos informan en sentido absolutamente negativo en cuanto a la posibilidad de reeducación de ésta joven, dada su edad y características.”) While initially held in a Barcelona prison, she was then transferred to the Women's Section of the Junta Provincial de Madrid prison facilities as a dependent of the Ministry of Justice. While in prison, her body and mental state were examined by the state. This included searching for physical deformities, measuring the size of her clitoris and asking for detailed information about her sexual habits.

Her final prison sentence term was given at between 127 days and one year in prison, followed by a 2-year mandatory ban from going to Barcelona and two years of government supervision. This sentence followed guidance spelled out in the Ley de Vagos y Maleantes.

== Historical importance ==
María Helena's behavior was so transgressive that the state felt a need to interfere with it and punish it. Despite this, the state does not make clear if the problematic nature of her behavior is that it was homosexual and transvestite in manner. Was she a butch lesbian or a trans man? Government texts discussing her incarceration do not make this clear. While not much more is known about María Helena, her story is important in highlighting how women who expressed masculine attributes were not acceptable to the Franco regime. Further, her story makes clear that despite regime propaganda, lesbians and lesboerotic behavior did exist during this period. This is important as religious groups and political parties like Partido Popular have continued to argue that the Francoist period was one in which lesbians did not exist, and that sexually deviant and sexually immoral behavior only existed in Spain as a consequence of the liberalization following the Spanish transition to democracy. María Helena's story is important because her exception case destabilizes narratives by repressive regimes by challenging false dichotomies.

== Context ==
The 1933 Ley de Vagos y Maleantes defined homosexuality as criminal act. It was constitutionally replaced by the 1970 Ley de Peligrosidad Social, which labeled homosexuality as a mental illness. These laws would later be used to imprison women and to commit them to mental institutions. Under the 1933 era law, only two charges were made against women. One of the women prosecuted under the law was prosecuted in the period between 1971 and 1978. At the time of María Helena's arrest, women did not go out alone to bars, and they did not transgress on masculine spaces.
