= Daniel's =

Lesbian bar in Spain

Daniel's, opened in late 1975, was one of the first lesbian bars in Spain and one of the first LGBT bars in Barcelona. Opened by María del Carmen Tobar, it originally was a bar and billiards room but expanded to have a dance hall. The bar attracted women from a wide variety of backgrounds including non-lesbian women. In the early years of the Spanish democratic transition the bar was accepted because its owner was well connected in the local government through Daniela her band-mate. The police still occasionally raided the bar, however, during its early years. Tobar played an active role in making Daniel's the center of lesbian life in Barcelona, sponsoring sports teams and a theater group. The bar also sold feminist literature, including the magazine call Red de Amazonas. The bar later closed, but would be remembered in books and exhibits for its importance in the lesbian history of Spain.

== History ==
Daniel's was one of the first lesbian bars in Spain and one of the first LGBTQ bars in Barcelona. It was located at Plaza de Cardona 7–8, in the Sant Gervasi neighborhood. Daniel's was opened in 1975 by María del Carmen Tobar (born in 1943 in Barcelona), shortly after Franco's death. It was named after a musical group, Daniela, which Tobar had founded with Teresa and Gisele. The bar was originally opened as a non-profit association to avoid the high tax rate. For this reason, patrons had to ring a bell outside to gain entrance, and were only admitted if they were known to Tobar herself.

The original bar consisted of a small bar downstairs which served drinks, and a staircase leading up to a second floor room, which held a billiards table and had benches lining the walls. The bar was decorated with an English pub motif and had many mirrors, red velvet and dim lighting. Within a few years of it opening, Tobar acquired a room adjacent to the bar that served as a dance hall.

As Daniel's was the only women's bar in the city, the bar attracted a large range of female clientele from around Barcelona and the region, including non-lesbian clientele. Among the numerous patrons were housewives, high school and university-aged girls, lesbian prostitutes, famous Spanish celebrities and more. The music of Mari Trini was frequently playing in the bar's early days, and Tobar hired Maria Giralt, a prominent LGBTQ activist from Barcelona, as the bar's DJ. Maria Giralt worked at Daniel's for a period of ten months.

Because lesbian and homosexual activity were still not technically legal when the bar was opened, it had a red light above the dance floor to warn of imminent police raids. When the light illuminated, the patrons would stop dancing and sit with board games and cards to appear inconspicuous. While these women were not at a high risk of being arrested due to the 1970 Law on dangerousness and social rehabilitation's targeting of gay men, the families of these women often sent them to psychiatric facilities because of their sexuality. This was sometimes viewed as even worse than jail. The bar was raided by police several times in its first few years of operation, though their justifications for raiding were always vague. They'd claim the need to ensure that the bar and its patrons were obeying good manners and displaying good morals, language akin to that of the 1970 law.

Tobar was keen to support lesbians and women not just through nightlife, but also throughout daily life. Consequently, the bar sponsored women's soccer teams, basketball teams and a theater group, Five Stars & the Comet. The theater group met in the dance hall at Daniel's, and performed an improv show called "Sala de espera." Daniel's was one of the few places in Spain to sell the Spanish feminist magazine called Laberint, later renamed Red de Amazonas. Daniel's was an important focal point, providing social cohesion to the emerging lesbian community in the post-Francoist era.

The bar no longer exists. Tobar died in 2009. However, her bar lives on in legacy and was featured at an exhibition in early 2013 at Ateneo de Madrid titled Women under suspicion. Memory and sexuality (1930-1980).

== References in culture ==
Daniel's was referenced in a volume of essays by Uruguayan writer Peri Rossi called Fatasías Eróticas in which two Italian women enter Daniel's bar after passing the scrutiny of its very protective owner, Maria del Carmen Tobar. It was also mentioned in a book published in 2019 called Barcelona Feminista 1975-1988. In 2016 the legacy of the now closed bar was featured in a YouTube video posted on the Travelqueers channel, in which women were interviewed about the history of the bar, their sentiments about its closure and how it has survived in memory and culture.
