= Baños Orientales =

The Baños Orientales (English: Oriental Baths) in Barcelona, Spain were a popular lesbian meeting place during Francoist Spain. Opened, in 1872 in Barcelona, they were almost exclusively for women from the start. They closed in 1988, and were demolished in 1990. The baths were important for several reasons. First, they represented a safe place for lesbians who faced repression from Francoist Spain. They were also important for women in Barcelona in general, because the all-women space allowed women to wear clothing like bikinis or no clothing at all. The baths have been remembered at a feminist book fair and as part of an exhibition about women in Francoist Spain.

== History ==
The baths were located at the Barceloneta beach. The Baños Orientales were opened in 1872 in Barcelona with a neo-Arab architectural style. This was a period which saw over a dozen new spa projects open along city beaches. Others included Junta de Damas, La Deliciosa, La Florida, Estrella, San Sebastián, Sirena, Neptuno, Tritón, and Pabellón del Ejército. The baths were one of two original located in the parish of Sant Miquel del Port. They had an 18-meter diameter pool. A storm later that year destroyed the bath's pool. The baths were almost exclusively for women from the start.

In 1987, in a period that saw a large number of rats invading Barcelona beaches, a patrol of the Guàrdia Urbana discovered rats in the pool of the Baños Orientales. When cleaning services arrived to deal with the issue, they collected 50 total rats. Bathers and swimmers were advised on another occasion to take showers and avoid entering the water because of the rat problem. People at the beach were not amused by this.

It was announced in 1988 that baths were to be demolished as part of a broader plan by the Municipal Government to modernize the city's beaches. The baths were destroyed on 22 November 1990. Thirty women chained themselves to the fence of the Baños Orientales in an attempt to stave off their destruction. The police had no sympathy for the protesters. They cut the wires they used to chain them to the fence. With protests still shouting and heavy rain starting, the bulldozers started to advance towards the baths. Protests ran inside the baths to try to save as much as they could from them.

== Political context ==
Lesbians had few places of their own in Francoist Spain as a result of repression, not just against lesbians and LGBT people but against women in general. One of the few places where lesbians gathered in numbers was at the Baños Orientales.

The baths were popular with all classes of women in Barcelona. Bikinis were first introduced in the 1950s in Spain, but were highly disapproved of by the government. Some women used their bikinis, brought in from France, at the baths. Using them elsewhere risked fines from the Guardia Civil.

During the 1970s, the baths were women only, and women would often go topless. Some women brought their children, including boys, with them to the baths in this period. The baths themselves turned a blind eye to women's behavior in this period. During the Francoist period, grown men would often hang around near the fence to the facility, being voyeurs and hoping to see topless and naked women that were alleged to be swimming there.

== Remembrance and historical memory ==
In 1990, the IV International Feminist Book Fair was held in Atarazanas, Barcelona with about 300 booksellers having booths. As part of the celebrations, "A Night of Mediterranean Music" was held at the location where the Baños Orienteles used to be. The baths were mentioned as part of an exhibit titled Mujeres bajo sospecha. Memoria y sexualidad (1930-1980) in 2013 organized by UNED Sociology professor Raquel Osborne at the Ateneo de Madrid.
