= Spanish Movement for Homosexual Liberation =

1970s Spanish gay rights organization

- Movimiento Español de Liberación Homosexual
- Formation: 1970
- Type: NGO
- Fields: gay rights
- Formerly called: Agrupación Homófila para la Igualdad Sexual

The Spanish Movement for Homosexual Liberation (Movimiento Español de Liberación Homosexual) was the first organization defending gay rights in Spain, founded in 1970. Initially they were called "la Agrupación Homófila para la Igualdad Sexual" (The Homophile Group for Sexual Equality).

== Creation ==
The association originates from the homosexual Catalonian groups that met in various private residences in Barcelona. The creation was fueled in part by the law on dangerousness and social rehabilitation passed in 1970 which made gay acts a crime. In 1970, Mir Bellgai and Roger de Gaimon, pseudonyms of Francesc Francino and Armand de Fluvià, created clandestinely in Barcelona, "la Agrupación Homófila para la Igualdad Sexual"(The Homophile Group for Sexual Equality).

In 1971, the group was renamed as "Movimiento Español de Liberación Homosexual"(Spanish Movement for Homosexual Liberation), already with branches in Madrid and Bilbao, named similarly to the Gay Liberation Front in the United States. The first meeting under the new name was on the tenth of July, 1972.

== Operations ==
One of the first actions of the group was to send a letter from Paris to Parliament and to some newspapers and magazines. This included pamphlets on homosexuality and the law, legal aspects of homosexuality, etc., with the goal of stopping the law on social danger from being passed. This action is believed to have helped soften the law. The movement was in contact with similar organizations in Argentina, The United States, France, The United Kingdom, Italy, and Puerto Rico. Representatives participated in international meetings in Paris (1973), Edinburg (1974), and Sheffield (1975). The meetings continued weekly in groups of 6 or 8 people in a clandestine manner in different private residences. It was not possible to hold larger meetings, as this would have called the attention of the police or the watchmen. The meetings held well known persons within their ranks, such as Fabià Puigserver and Ventura Pons. Although, some of the participants preferred to stay anonymous even thirty years later. The meetings had discussions about all of the problems that gay people in Spain faced at that time such as family and church.

== End of the group ==
The movement lost momentum, caused by political pressure, and the meetings ended in 1973 or 74.

After the death of Franco in 1975, the group returned under the name "Front d'Alliberament Gai de Catalunya" (Gay Liberation Front of Catalonia). The new organization, with a Catalan nationalism aspect, became one of the most important in Spain after the Spanish transition to democracy. It has since become a driving force in the history of the gay rights movement in Catalonia and Spain.

=== Recognition ===
- 2016: Medal of Honor from City Council of Barcelona
- 2025: Recipient of the Creu de Sant Jordi from the Généralité de Catalogne
