= Esther Tusquets =

Spanish publisher, novelist and essayist (1936–2012)

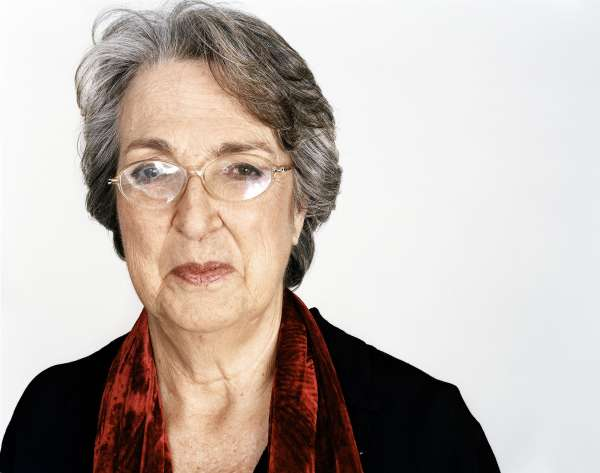
- Tusquets in 2010
- Born: 30 August 1936; Barcelona
- Died: 23 July 2012 (aged 75); Barcelona
- Education: University of Barcelona
- Occupations: Publisher, novelist, essayist
- Writing career
- Language: Spanish
- Period: 1978–2012

Esther Tusquets (30 August 1936 – 23 July 2012) was a Spanish publisher, novelist and essayist.

== Biography ==
Tusquets was born in Barcelona, Catalonia, Spain. Her brother is the architect Òscar Tusquets.

She studied philosophy, literature and history at the University of Barcelona. She spent several years teaching literature and history at the Carillo Academy. She was the director of the publishing house Lumen in Barcelona.

Tusquets published her first novel El mismo mar de todos los veranos (The Same Sea as Every Summer) in 1978. It was the first in a trilogy and was followed by El amor es un juego solitario (Love is a Solitary Game) in 1979 and Varada tras el último naufragio (Stranded) in 1980. Her focus in these novels was language and the lesbian body as battlefields.

Tuquet had Parkinson's disease for several years. She died of pneumonia at the age of 75 in Barcelona on 23 July 2012.
