= Carme Riera =

Spanish writer

The Most Excellent Carme Riera
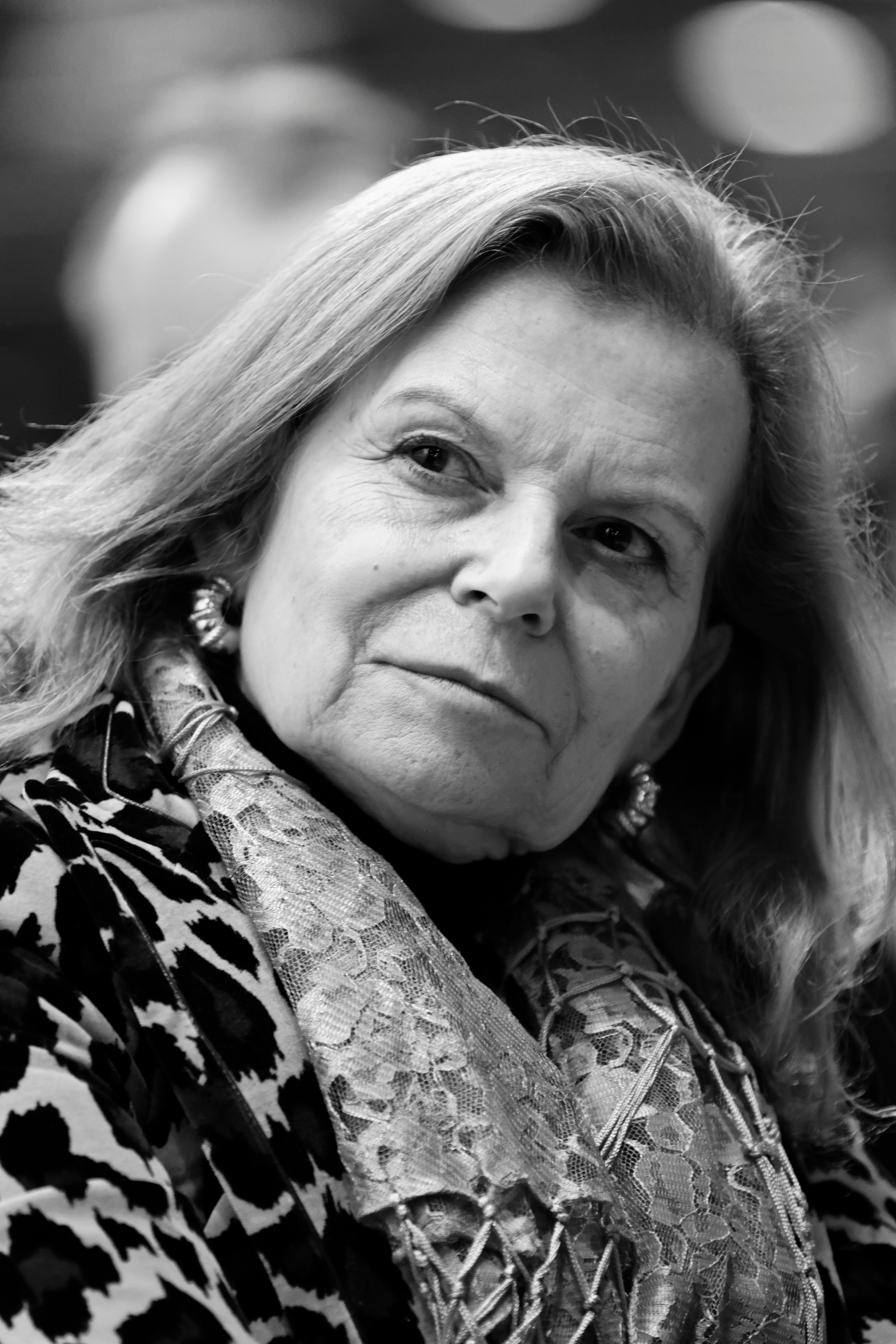
- Riera in Paris, 2013
- Born: Carme Riera Guilera; 12 January 1948 (age 78); Palma (Balearic Islands), Spain
- Education: Hispanic studies
- Occupations: Professor and writer.
- Writing career
- Language: Catalan and Spanish
- Genres: Novel, story, essay
- Notable awards: Prudenci Bertrana Prize; Ramon Llull Novel Award; Josep Pla Prize for narrative Lletra d'Or Prize; Joan Crexells Prize for narrative National Novel Prize (Spain); National Prize for Literature (Catalonia); Serra d'Or Critics Award; Sant Jordi Prize for novel Creu de Sant Jordi Award

Seat n of the Real Academia Española
- Incumbent
- Assumed office 7 November 2013 (Note: Elected on 19 April 2012)
- Preceded by: Valentín García Yebra

Carme Riera Guilera (Catalan pronunciation: [ˈkaɾmə riˈeɾə]; born 12 January 1948) is a novelist and essayist. She has also written short stories, scripts for radio and television and literary criticism. She holds a doctorate in Hispanic Philology and is a professor of Spanish literature at the Universitat Autònoma de Barcelona.

Riera was born in Palma. She attended the Sacred Heart primary school and the Joan Alcover Institute in Palma, where she met Majorcan writers and fell in love with a teacher, Francisco Llinás.

In 1965 she moved to Barcelona to study Hispanic Philology in the Department of Philosophy and Letters of the Universitat Autònoma de Barcelona. She graduated in 1970 and the following year married Francisco Llinás and was hired by Manuel Blecua to give classes in the department.

That year her son Ferran was born, and she began her literary career. She writes in Catalan and Spanish. Her self-translations are often published at the same time. She lives in Barcelona.

Her best-known work is the historical novel "Dins el darrer blau" (1994), winner of several prizes (see below) and the first novel in Catalan to win the Premio Nacional de Narrativa (National Prize for Narrative), awarded by the Spanish Ministry of Culture. An English translation by Kathleen McNerney, "Blue Horizons of no Return: Sephardic Journeys", is awaiting publication.

Riera was elected to Seat n of the Real Academia Española on 19 April 2012, she took up her seat on 7 November 2013.

== Influences ==
The background reader of Carme Riera, consequence of an attitude towards literature, forms a frame of references. Sappho, Petrarch, Goethe and Virginia Woolf parade through its pages, but also classical Spanish writers, as Miguel de Cervantes, Clarin, Carmen Laforet, Valle-Inclán, Gil de Biedma ... However, the author has placed the roots of her narrative in Majorcan tales and the work of two writers in the construction of contemporary Catalan narrative: Caterina Albert and Rodoreda.

== Works ==
- Te deix, amor, la mar com a penyora, 1975 (I Leave You, My Love, The Sea as My Pledge)
- Je pos per testimoni les gavines, 1977
- Quasi bé un conte, la vida de Ramon Llull, 1980
- Els cementiris de Barcelona. Barcelona: Edhasa, 1981 (The Cemeteries of Barcelona)
- Una primavera per a Domenico Guarini. Barcelona: Montesinos Editor, S.A., 1981 (A Springtime for Domenico Guarini)
- Epitelis tendríssims. Barcelona: Edicions 62 S.A., 1981
- “El reportaje”. Short story. In: Doce relatos de mujeres. Navajo, Ymelda (ed.), Madrid: Alianza, 1982, pp. 181–191. Cuentos.
- Qüestió d'amor propi. Barcelona: Laia, 1987
- La molt exemplar història del Gos Màgic i la seva cua. Barcelona: Empúries S.A., Editorial, 1988
- La escuela de Barcelona. Barcelona: Anagrama, 1988. Essay. Winner of the XVI Premio Anagrama 1988 (The School of Barcelona)
- Joc de miralls, 1989 (Mirror game)
- La poesía de Carlos Barral. Barcelona: Edicions 62 S.A., 1990 (The Poetry of Carlos Barral)
- Hay veneno y Jazmín en tu tinta, aproximación a la, 1991
- Contra l'amor en conpanyia i altres relats. Barcelona: Destino, 1991
- Dins el darrer blau, 1994 (Blue Horizons of no Return)
- “Princesa meva, lletra d'àngel.” Short Story. In: Érase una vez la paz. Barcelona: Planeta, 1996, pp. 187–193. Cuentos.
- Quadern d'una espera, 1998
- “Mon semblable, mon frère”. Short Story. In: Barcelona, un día. Regàs, Rosa (comp.) . Madrid: Alfaguara, 1998, pp. 357–376. Cuentos.
- Cap al cel obert. Barcelona: Destino, 2000. Novel.
- “Metamorfosis”. Short Story. In: Orosia. Jaca: Pirineum Multimedia, 2002, pp. 147–155. Cuentos.
- La meitat de l'ánima, 2003. Novel. Winner of the 2003 Premi Sant Jordi (Half of the Soul)

== Awards ==
- 1980 Prudenci Bertrana Prize for her novel Una primavera per a Domenico Guarini (A Springtime for Domenico Guarini).
- 1989 Ramon Llull Novel Award for her Joc de miralls (A Play of Mirrors)
- 1994 Josep Pla Award for Dins el darrer blau (In the Last Shade of Blue), a historical novel which also received the Joan Crexells Prize, the Lletra d'Or (Golden Letter) Prize, the Ministry of Culture National Prize for Narrative and the Elio Vittorini Prize from the Syracuse Department of Tourism.
- 2000, the Generalitat (Autonomous Government) of Catalonia awarded her the Creu de Sant Jordi (Cross of Saint George). She is a member of the Associació d'Escriptors en Llengua Catalana (Association of Catalan Language Writers).
- 2015 Premio Nacional de las Letras Españolas
