= Ana María Moix =

Ana María Moix

Ana María Moix (12 April 1947 – 28 February 2014) was a Spanish poet, novelist, short story writer, translator and editor. A member of the Novísimos, she was the younger sister of the writer, Terenci Moix.

Moix was born in Barcelona and studied philosophy at the University of Barcelona. Active in contemporary Spanish poetry, she gained notability by being the only woman included in 1968 by José María Castellet in the Novísimos. From 1969 to 1973, she published three books of poetry. Later, she stopped publishing fiction for more than ten years, except for the children's book Los robots. Her second book of short stories won the 1985 City of Barcelona Award, after which she published another novel and two collections of short stories. Moix translated dozens of books, mainly from French. From 1976 to 1979, she was part of the team that published the journal, Vindicación Feminista. Moix was able to employ textual strategies "in order to counter the silencing of lesbianism while still managing to evade the Francoist censor".

Moix was awarded the Creu de Sant Jordi in 2006. She died in Barcelona in 2014 at the age 66, a victim of cancer.

== Selected works ==
=== Poetry ===
- Baladas del dulce Jim, 1969
- Call me Stone, 1969
- No time for flowers y otras historias, 1971
- A imagen y semejanza, 1983

=== Prose ===
- Julia, 1970
- Ese chico pelirrojo a quien veo cada día, 1971
- Walter ¿por qué te fuiste?, 1973
- La maravillosa colina de las edades primitivas, 1973
- Veinticuatro por veinticuatro, 1973
- Mara Girona: una pintura en libertad, 1977
- Los robots. Las penas, 1982
- Las virtudes peligrosas, 1985
- Miguelón, 1986
- La niebla y otros relatos, 1988
- Vals negro, 1994
- El baix Llobregat, 29 municipis i un riu. Barcelona, 1995
- Extraviadas ilustres, 1996
- 24 horas con la Gauche divine, 2002
- El querido rincón, 2002
- De mi vida real nada sé, 2002

=== Essay ===
- Manifiesto personal, 2011
