= 1977 Barcelona gay pride demonstration =

Spanish gay pride demonstration

- Native name: Catalan: Manifestació de l'orgull gai de 1977 a Barcelona; Spanish: Manifestación del orgullo gay de Barcelona de 1977
- Date: 26 June 1977
- Venue: La Rambla
- Location: Barcelona; 41°22′53″N 2°10′23″E
- Type: Gay pride demonstration
- Theme: LGBT rights
- Organized by: Front d'Alliberament Gai de Catalunya (Gay Liberation Front of Catalonia)
- Participants: ≈5,000
- Outcome: Repressed by police using rubber bullets
- Injuries: 3 serious
- Arrests: at least 1

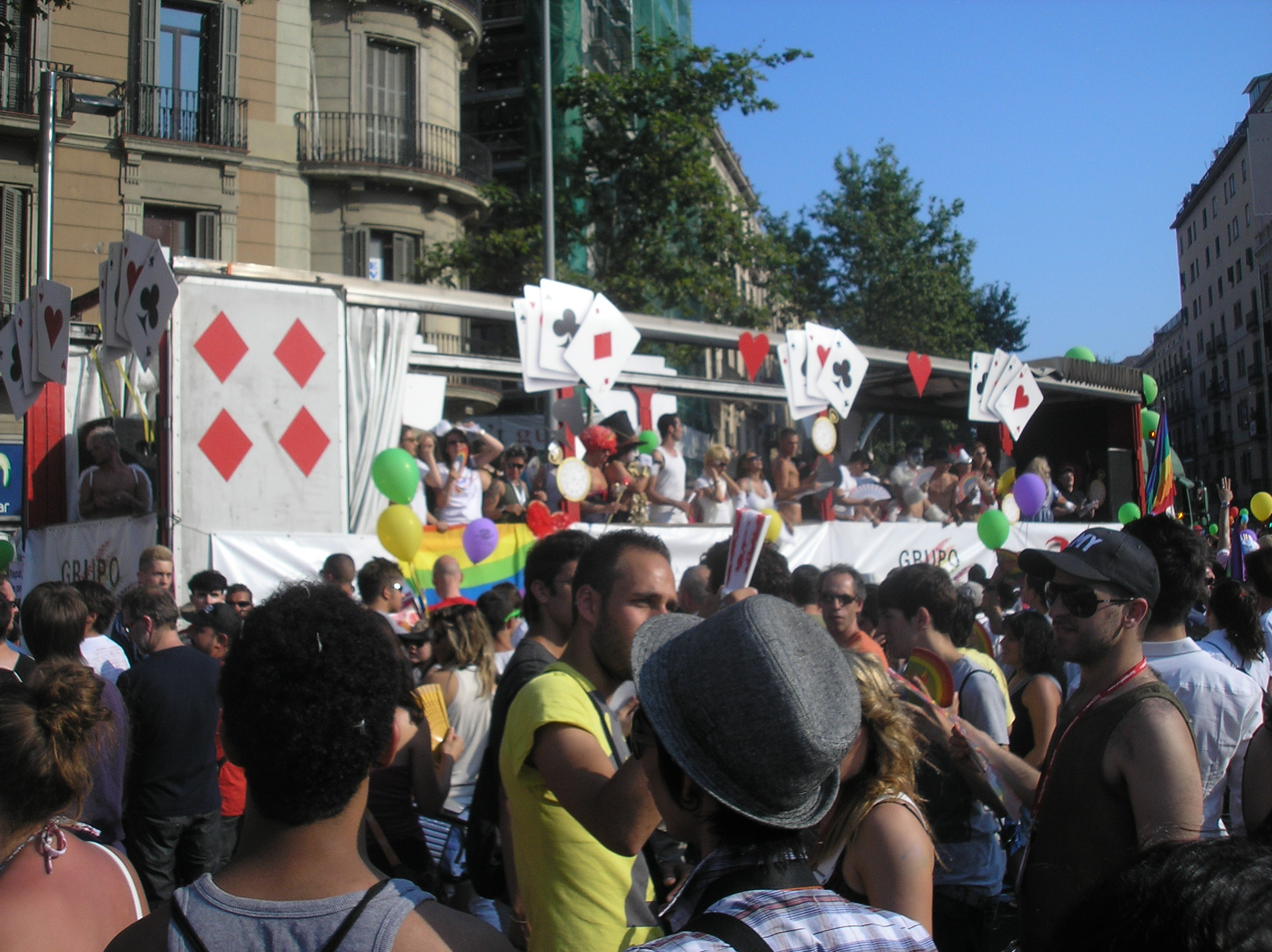
Pride demonstration in Barcelona 2010

The 1977 Barcelona gay pride demonstration took place on 26 June of that year and was Spain's first great act of LGBT visibility. The gathering, organized by the newly minted Front d'Alliberament Gai de Catalunya (Gay Liberation Front of Catalonia) brought together almost five thousand people who, headed by a group of transvestites, peacefully paraded along La Rambla in Barcelona. The demonstration was harshly repressed by the police, who mounted several charges and shot at demonstrators with rubber bullets. At least three demonstrators were seriously wounded, and a fourth, Doctor Oriol Martí, was beaten, arrested and jailed for 56 days at La Model prison for allegedly attacking and insulting agents of authority.

The gathering's motto was "Nosaltres no tenim por, nosaltres som" ("We have no fear, we are"). Other slogans that could be heard or read that day were: "My body is mine and I do with it what I want"; "Sexual amnesty!" and "We are not dangerous!".

== Background ==
In 1970, Francesc Francino and Armand de Fluvià clandestinely created in Barcelona the Movimiento Español de Liberación Homosexual (Spanish Homosexual Liberation Movement), Spain's first ever modern association for defending homosexual rights. Its activities developed until, in 1974, it dissolved in the face of police harassment. In 1975, after dictator Francisco Franco's death, the Front d'Alliberament Gai de Catalunya (Gay Liberation Front of Catalonia) was created, although it was not legalized until 1980. The Barcelona demonstration, for which the then illegal Gay Liberation Front had called, caught the press's attention and marked a turning point in the defence of lesbians', gays', transsexuals' and bisexuals' rights.

When Franco died in 1975, Spain lived through an intense period in which the recognition of sexual minorities' rights was being strengthened. During Franco's dictatorship, homosexuality was legally persecuted under the law known as the "Law of Vagrants and Thugs", which was in force until 1970, and then under the "Law on Dangerousness and Social Rehabilitation", which was not completely abolished until 1995. Being homosexual or having homosexual relations was in those days punishable by fines, and those deemed guilty of such things could even be sent to prison or to a psychiatric institution.

== Photographic documentation ==
The Catalan photographer Colita captured some moments on film during the demonstration, some of which make up part of the collection at the Museo Nacional Centro de Arte Reina Sofía in Madrid.

After keeping them for more than 40 years, photographer Enrique Serrano from Santa Coloma de Gramenet brought back to light some unpublished photographs that he had taken when, by chance, he had happened on the demonstration in Barcelona, when he was 17 years old.

== See also ==
- LGBT rights in Spain
- LGBT history in Spain
- International LGBT Pride Day
