= 1970 Law on dangerousness and social rehabilitation =

Criminal law in Spain

Cortes Españolas
- Passed: August 4, 1970
- Enacted: August 6, 1970
- Commenced: February 6, 1971
- Repealed: November 23, 1995

Repeals
- November 6, 1978

The 1970 Law on Social Danger and Rehabilitation (la ley de peligrosidad y rehabilitación social) was a Spanish penal code law approved by dictator Francisco Franco's regime on August 5, 1970. The Law of Danger and Social Rehabilitation specifically criminalized homosexuality and established a spectrum of punishments for citizens caught engaging in homosexual acts, including time in concentration camps or prison. The anti-homosexuality clause of the law was repealed following the end of Francisco Franco's regime, but homophobia continued long past the political transition.

== Content of the Law ==
The Law on Social Danger and Rehabilitation replaced the 1933 Law on Vagrants and Criminals (la ley de vagos y maleantes) which sought to punish and exclude "antisocial" members of society, such as beggars, vandals, drug traffickers, pornographers, prostitutes, pimps and illegal immigrants. Although the jurisdiction of the Law of Vagrants and Criminals was officially extended in 1954 to include homosexuals as "antisocial" members of society, the law never targeted them specifically. Under the 3rd point of the 2nd article in the Law on Social Danger and Rehabilitation, "those who carry out acts of homosexuality" were officially criminalized, along with ruffians, pimps, prostitutes, pornographers, beggars, addicts, drug dealers, gang members, and others who disregard the norms of social coexistence.

Punishments for homosexuality included internment in rehabilitation establishments for periods lasting between six months and five years, exclusion from visiting certain public spaces or from living in specific neighborhoods, and possible prison time. There were two concentration camps set up for prisoners under this law: one in Badajoz and one in Huelva. Although not written into law, punishments would sometimes include torture, public humiliation, or forced medical procedures such as shock therapy, which attempted to rid subjects of homosexuality.

== Impact ==
The regime justified punishment conditions by framing homosexuality as a disease and popularizing a discourse centered on the "inherent perversion" of homosexuals, who were painted as a threat to society, and particularly to young people. The law perpetuated a widespread fear of public scandal and political persecution throughout the queer community of Spain. The overwhelming majority of those persecuted under this law were men, which divided the gay and lesbian communities and added to a popular culture of invisibility around Spanish lesbians. Several activist groups were established during the Spanish political transition to advocate for homosexual rights and the repeal of the 1970 law. The first demonstration for homosexual rights in Spain occurred in Barcelona in 1977, with the first pride march following in Madrid a year later, and both were met with brute force from law enforcement. Scholars accredit the growth of the LGBTQ rights movement in Spain to the "defense of identity" that followed the identification and criminalization of homosexuality in the 1970 Law on Social Danger and Rehabilitation.

== Repeal and Post-Francoist Spain ==
The final years of Franco's dictatorship are characterized by increasingly repressive policies, the 1970 Law included. Even after Franco's death in 1975, Spanish legislation often did not favor the rights of the queer community. The 1975 general pardon and the 1977 amnesty law, which freed political prisoners from the Franco regime, did not extend to those citizens who had been punished under the Law of Social Danger and Rehabilitation.

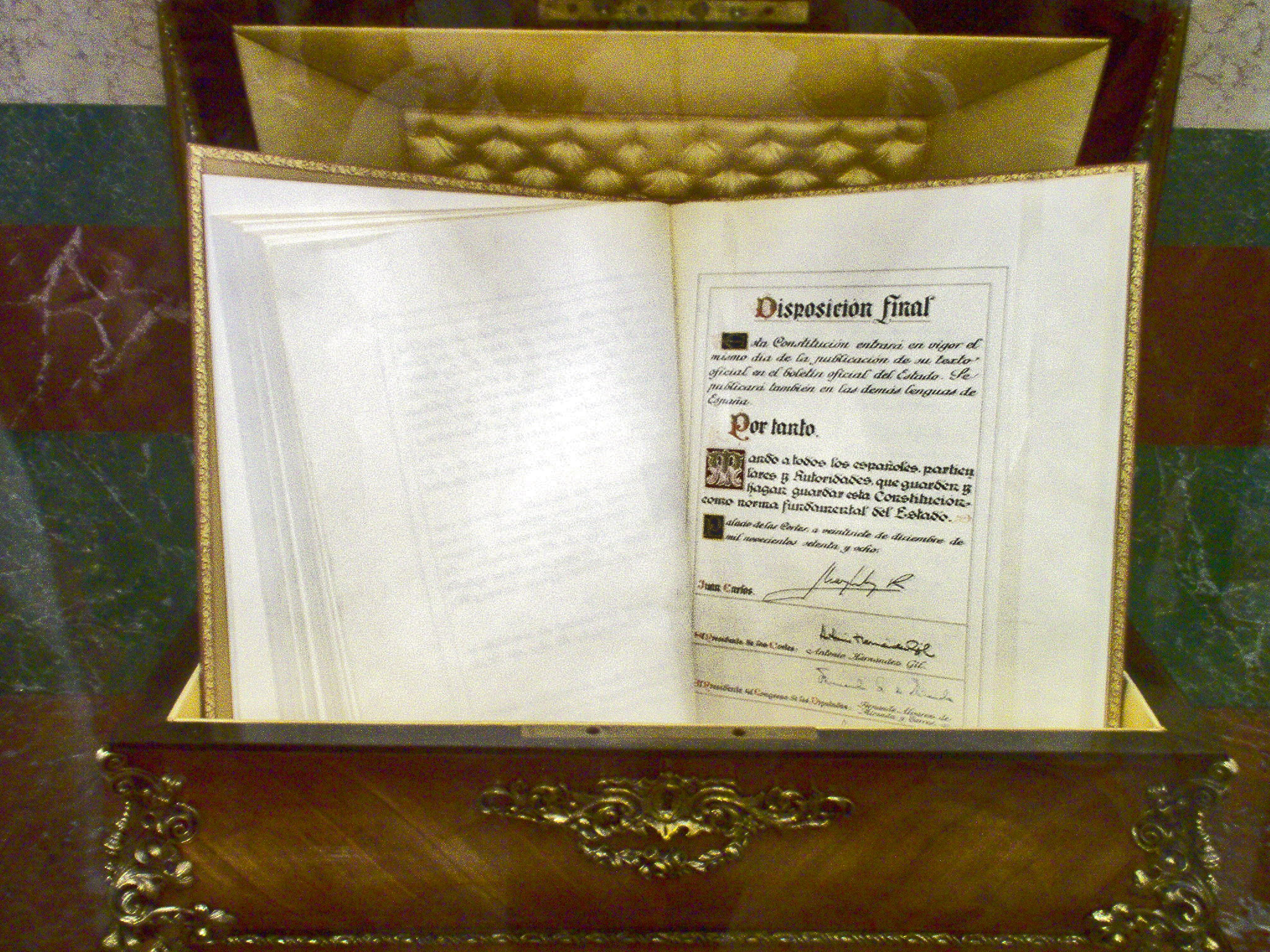
Spanish Constitution of 1978

Newly elected members of the 1977 Congress of Deputies from the Communist Party of Spain proposed an amendment to the Law of Social Danger that included the repeal of its third section, which criminalized those participating in homosexual acts. Along with the ratification of a new democratic constitution in Spain on December 6, 1978, this part of Law of Social Danger was overturned, as Judge Miguel Lopéz Muñiz argued that it was a "product of the Franquista regime," but many homosexual prisoners were not released until a year later, in 1979. In January 1979, several articles of the law were repealed, among them one referring to "acts of homosexuality." On November 23, 1995, the Law was repealed in total by the 10th Organic Law of Penal Code. On December 13, 1999, the third additional provision of the Organic Law on Protection of Personal Data 15/1999 established that the police files of all those repressed by this law would be declared confidential, and only historians would be able to access their data for statistical purposes.
