= LGBTQ rights in Spain =

- Location of Spain (dark green) – in Europe (light green & dark grey) – in the European Union (light green) – [Legend]
- Legal status: Legal from 1822 to 1928, from 1932 to 1954 and since 1979, age of consent equalized
- Gender identity: Transgender persons allowed to change legal gender without prior sex reassignment surgery and sterilisation
- Military: LGBT people allowed to serve
- Discrimination protections: Sexual orientation and gender identity protections

Family rights
- Recognition of relationships: Same-sex marriage since 2005
- Adoption: Full adoption rights since 2005

Lesbian, gay, bisexual, transgender, and queer (LGBTQ) rights in Spain rank among the highest in the world, having undergone significant advancements within recent decades. Among ancient Romans in Spain, sexual relations between men was viewed as commonplace, but a law against homosexuality was promulgated by Christian emperors Constantius II and Constans, and Roman moral norms underwent significant changes leading up to the 4th century. Laws against sodomy were later established during the legislative period. They were first repealed from the Spanish Code in 1822, but changed again along with societal attitudes towards homosexuality during the Spanish Civil War and Francisco Franco's regime.

Throughout the late-20th century, the rights of the LGBTQ community received more awareness and same-sex sexual activity became legal once again in 1979 with an equal age of consent to heterosexual intercourse. After recognising unregistered cohabitation between same-sex couples countrywide and registered partnerships in certain cities and communities since 1998 and 2003, Spain legalised both same-sex marriage and adoption rights for same-sex couples in 2005. Transgender individuals can change their legal gender without the need for sex reassignment surgery or sterilisation. Discrimination in employment regarding sexual orientation has been banned nationwide since 1995. A broader law prohibiting discrimination based on sexual orientation and gender identity in employment and provision of goods and services nationwide was passed in 2022. LGBTQ people are allowed to serve in the military and MSMs can donate blood since 2005.

Spain has been recognised as one of the most culturally liberal and LGBT-friendly countries in the world and LGBT culture has had a significant role in Spanish literature, music, cinema and other forms of entertainment as well as social issues and politics. Public opinion on homosexuality is noted by pollsters as being overwhelmingly positive, with a study conducted by the Pew Research Center in 2013 indicating that more than 88 percent of Spanish citizens accepted homosexuality, making it the most LGBT-friendly of the 39 countries polled. LGBT visibility has also increased in several layers of society such as the Guardia Civil, army, judicial, and clergy. However, in other areas such as sports, the LGBT community remains marginalised. Spanish film directors such as Pedro Almodóvar have increased awareness regarding LGBT tolerance in Spain among international audiences. In 2007, Madrid hosted the annual Europride celebration and hosted WorldPride in 2017. The cities of Barcelona and Madrid also have a reputation as two of the most LGBT-friendly cities in the world. Gran Canaria and Tenerife are also known worldwide as an LGBT tourist destination.

== LGBT history in Spain ==
=== Roman Empire ===
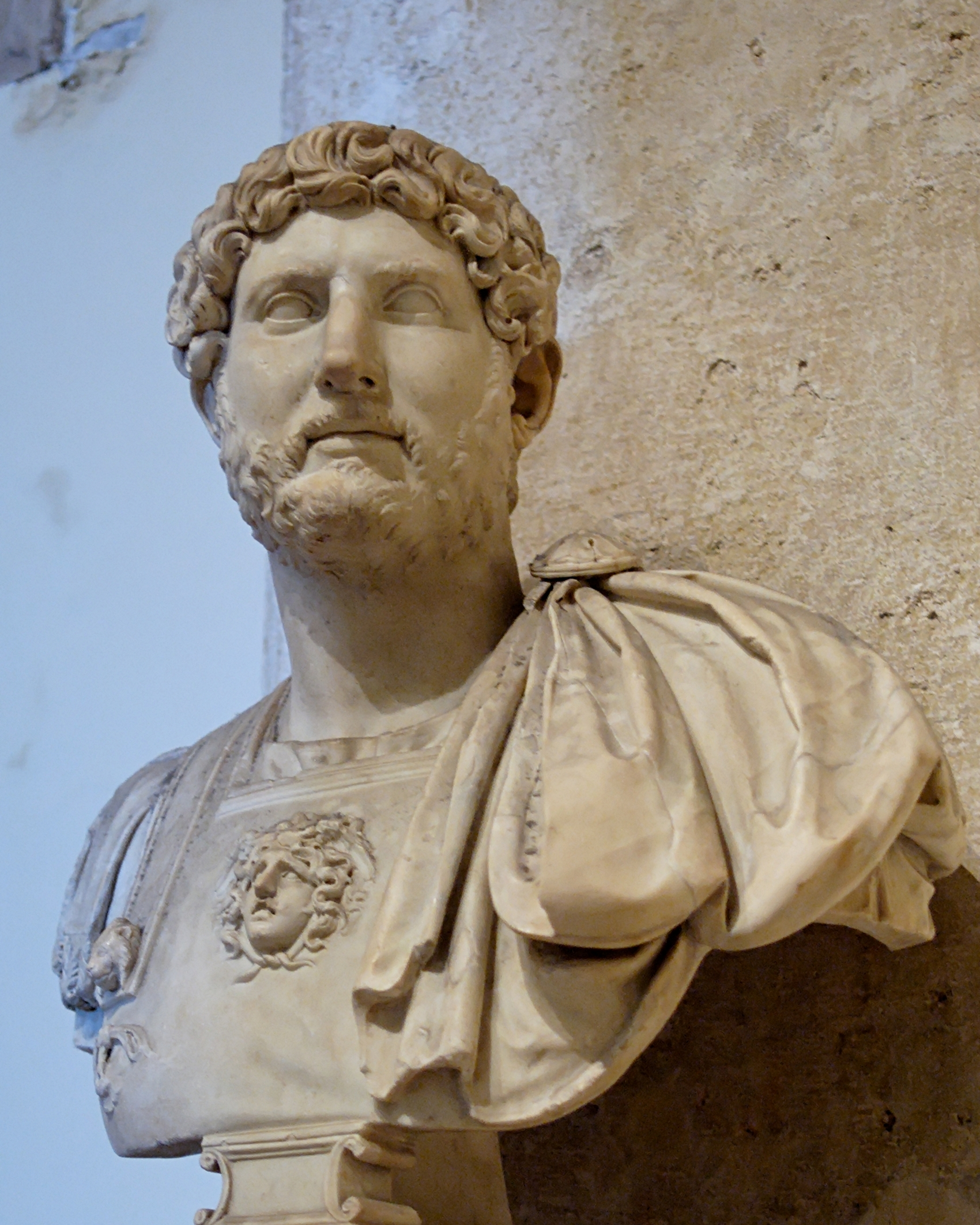
This bust of Roman emperor Hadrian, a native of what is today Spain, and lover of the boy Antinous, can be found today in the Palazzo dei Conservatori in Rome.

The Romans brought, as with other aspects of their culture, their sexual morality to Spain. Romans were open-minded about their relationships, and sexuality among men was commonplace. Among the Romans, bisexuality seems to have been perceived as the ideal. Eighteenth-century English historian Edward Gibbon wrote, of the first fifteen emperors, "Claudius was the only one whose taste in love was entirely correct" by his cultural standards – the implication being that he was the only one not to take men or boys as lovers. Gibbon based this on Suetonius' factual statement that "He had a great passion for women, but had no interest in men." Suetonius and the other ancient authors actually used this against Claudius. They accused him of being dominated by these same women and wives, of being uxorious, and of being a womaniser.

Marriages between men occurred during the early Roman Empire. These marriages were condemned by law in the Theodosian Code of Christian emperors Constantius and Constans on 16 December 342. Martial, a first-century poet, born and educated in Bílbilis (now Calatayud in Aragon, Spain), but spent most of his life in Rome, attests to same-sex marriages between men during the early Roman Empire. He also characterised Roman life in epigrams and poems. In a fictitious first person, he talks about anal and vaginal penetration, and about receiving fellatio from both men and women. He also attests to adult men who played passive roles with other men. He describes, for example, the case of an older man who played the passive role and let a younger slave occupy the active role.

The first recorded marriage between two men occurred during the reign of Emperor Nero, who is reported to have married two other men on different occasions. Roman Emperor Elagabalus is also reported to have done the same. Emperors who were universally praised and lauded by the Romans, such as Hadrian and Trajan, openly had male lovers, although it is not recorded whether or not they ever married their lovers. Hadrian's lover, Antinous, received deification upon his death and numerous statues exist of him today, more than any other non-imperial person.

Among the conservative upper Senatorial classes, status was more important than the person in any sexual relationship. Roman citizens could penetrate non-citizen males, plebeian (or low class) males, male slaves, boys, eunuchs, and male prostitutes just as easily as young female slaves, concubines, and female prostitutes. However, no upper class citizen would allow himself to be penetrated by another man, regardless of age or status. He would have to play the active role in any sexual relationship with a man. There was a strict distinction between an active homosexual (who would have sex with men and women) and a passive homosexual (who was regarded as servile and effeminate). This morality was in fact used against Julius Caesar, whose allegedly passive sexual interactions with the King of Bithynia, Nicomedes, were commented everywhere in Rome. However, many people in the upper classes ignored such negative ideas about playing a passive role, as is proved by the actions of the Roman emperors Nero and Elagabalus.

In contrast to the Greeks, evidence for homosexual relationships between men of the same age exists for the Romans. These sources are diverse and include such things as the Roman novel Satyricon, graffiti and paintings found at Pompeii, as well as inscriptions left on tombs and papyri found in Egypt. Generally speaking, however, a kind of pederasty (not unlike the one that can be found among the Greeks) was dominant in Rome. Even among heterosexual relationships, men tended to marry women much younger than themselves, usually in their early teens.

Lesbianism was also known, in two forms. Feminine women would have sex with adolescent girls: a kind of female pederasty, and masculine women followed male pursuits, including fighting, hunting, and relationships with other women.

The first law against same-sex marriage was promulgated by the Christian emperors Constantius II and Constans. Nevertheless, the Christian emperors continued to collect taxes on male prostitutes until the reign of Anastasius (491–581). In the year 390, Christian emperors Valentinian II, Theodosius I, and Arcadius declared homosexual sex to be illegal and those who were guilty of it were condemned to be burned alive in front of the public. Christian Emperor Justinian I (527–565) made homosexuals a scapegoat for problems such as "famines, earthquakes, and pestilences".

As a result of this, Roman morality changed by the 4th century. For example, Ammianus Marcellinus harshly condemned the sexual behaviour of the Taifali, a tribe located between the Carpathian Mountains and the Black Sea which practiced the Greek-style pederasty. In 342, emperors Constans and Constantius II introduced a law to punish passive homosexuality (possibly by castration), to which later in 390 Theodosius I would add death by fire to all passive homosexuals that worked in brothels. In 438, this law was expanded to include all passive homosexuals, in 533 Justinian punished any homosexual act with castration and death by fire, and in 559 this law became even more strict.

Three reasons have been given for this change of attitude. Procopius, historian at Justinian's court, considered that behind the laws were political motivations, as they allowed Justinian to destroy his enemies and confiscate their properties, and were hardly efficient stopping homosexuality between ordinary citizens. The second reason, and perhaps the more important one, was the rising influence of Christianity in the Roman society, including the Christian paradigm about sex serving solely for reproduction purposes. Colin Spencer, in his book Homosexuality: A History, suggests the possibility that a certain sense of self-preservation in the Roman society after suffering some epidemic such as the Black fever increased the reproductive pressure in individuals. This phenomenon would be combined with the rising influence of Stoicism in the Empire.

Until the year 313, there was no common doctrine about homosexuality in Christianity, but it is the mistaken belief that Paul had already condemned it as contra natura, though he had no exegetical reason for doing so:

And likewise also the men, leaving the natural use of the woman, burned in their lust one toward another; men with men working that which is unseemly, and receiving in themselves that recompence of their error which was meet. Bible King James. Romans 1:27.

Eventually, the Church Fathers created a literary corpus in which homosexuality and sex were condemned most energetically, fighting against a common practice in that epoch's society. On the other hand, homosexuality was identified with heresy, not only because of the pagan traditions, but also due to the rites of some gnostic sects or Manichaeism, which, according to Augustine of Hippo, practised homosexual rites.

=== Kingdom of the Visigoths (418–718) ===
The Germanic peoples had little tolerance for homosexuals, whom they considered on the same level as "imbeciles" and slaves, and glorified the warrior camaraderie between men. However, there are reports in Scandinavian countries of feminine and transvestite pastors, and the Nordic gods, the Æsir, including Thor and Odin, obtained arcane recognition drinking semen.

In the Early Middle Ages, attitudes toward homosexuality remained constant. There are known cases of homosexual behaviour which did not receive punishment, even if they were not accepted. For example, King Clovis I on his baptism day confessed to having relationships with other men; or Alcuin, an Anglo-Saxon poet whose verses and letters contain homoerotism.

One of the first legal corpus that considered male homosexuality a crime in Europe was the Liber Iudiciorum (or Lex Visigothorum). The Visigoth law included in that code (L. 3,5,6) punished sodomy with banishment and castration. Within the term "castration" were included all sexual crimes considered unnatural, such as male homosexuality, anal sex (heterosexual and homosexual) and zoophilia. Lesbianism was considered sodomy only if it included phallic aids.

It was King Chindasuinth (642–653) who dictated that the punishment for homosexuality should be castration. Such a harsh measure was unheard of in Visigoth laws, except for the cases of Jews practising circumcision. After being castrated, the culprit was given to the care of the local bishop, who would then banish him. If he was married, the marriage was declared void, the dowry was returned to the woman and any possessions distributed among his heirs.

=== Islamic Spain (718–1492) ===
The Muslims who invaded and successfully conquered the peninsula in the early 8th century had a noticeably more open attitude to homosexuality than their Visigothic predecessors. In the book Medieval Iberia: An Encyclopedia, Daniel Eisenberg describes homosexuality as "a key symbolic issue throughout the Middle Ages in Iberia", stating that in al-Andalus, homosexual pleasures were indulged in by the intellectual and political elite. There is significant evidence for this. Rulers, such as Abd-ar-Rahman III, Al-Hakam II, Hisham II, and Al Mu'tamid ibn Abbad, openly kept male harems, to the point that, to ensure an offspring, a girl had to be disguised as a boy to seduce Al-Hakam II. It was said that male prostitutes charged higher fees and had a higher class of clientele than did their female counterparts. Evidence can also be found in the repeated criticisms of Christians and especially the abundant poetry of homosexual nature. References to both pederasty and love between adult males have been found. Although homosexual practices were never officially condoned, prohibitions against them were rarely enforced, and usually there was not even a pretense of doing so. Sexual activity between men was not seen as a form of identity. Very little is known about lesbian sexual activity during this period.

=== Kingdom of Spain (1492–1812) ===
By 1492, the last Islamic kingdom in the Iberian Peninsula, the Emirate of Granada, was invaded and conquered by the Crown of Castile and the Crown of Aragon. This marked the Christian unification of the Iberian peninsula and the return of Catholic morality. By the early sixteenth century, royal codes decreed death by burning for sodomy and was punished by civil authorities. It fell under the jurisdiction of the Inquisition only in the territories of Aragon, when, in 1524, Clement VII, in a papal brief, granted jurisdiction over sodomy to the Inquisition of Aragon, whether or not it was related to heresy. In Castile, cases of sodomy were not adjudicated, unless related to heresy. The tribunal of Zaragoza distinguished itself for its severity in judging these offences: between 1571 and 1579 more than 100 men accused of sodomy were prosecuted and at least 36 were executed; in total, between 1570 and 1630 there were 534 trials and 102 executions. This does not include, however, those normally executed by the secular authorities.

=== First French Empire ===
In 1812, Barcelona was annexed into the First French Empire and incorporated into the First French Empire as part of the department Montserrat (later Bouches-de-l'Èbre–Montserrat), where it remained until it was returned to Spain in 1814. During that time same-sex sexual intercourse was legal in Barcelona.

=== Kingdom of Spain (1814–1931) ===
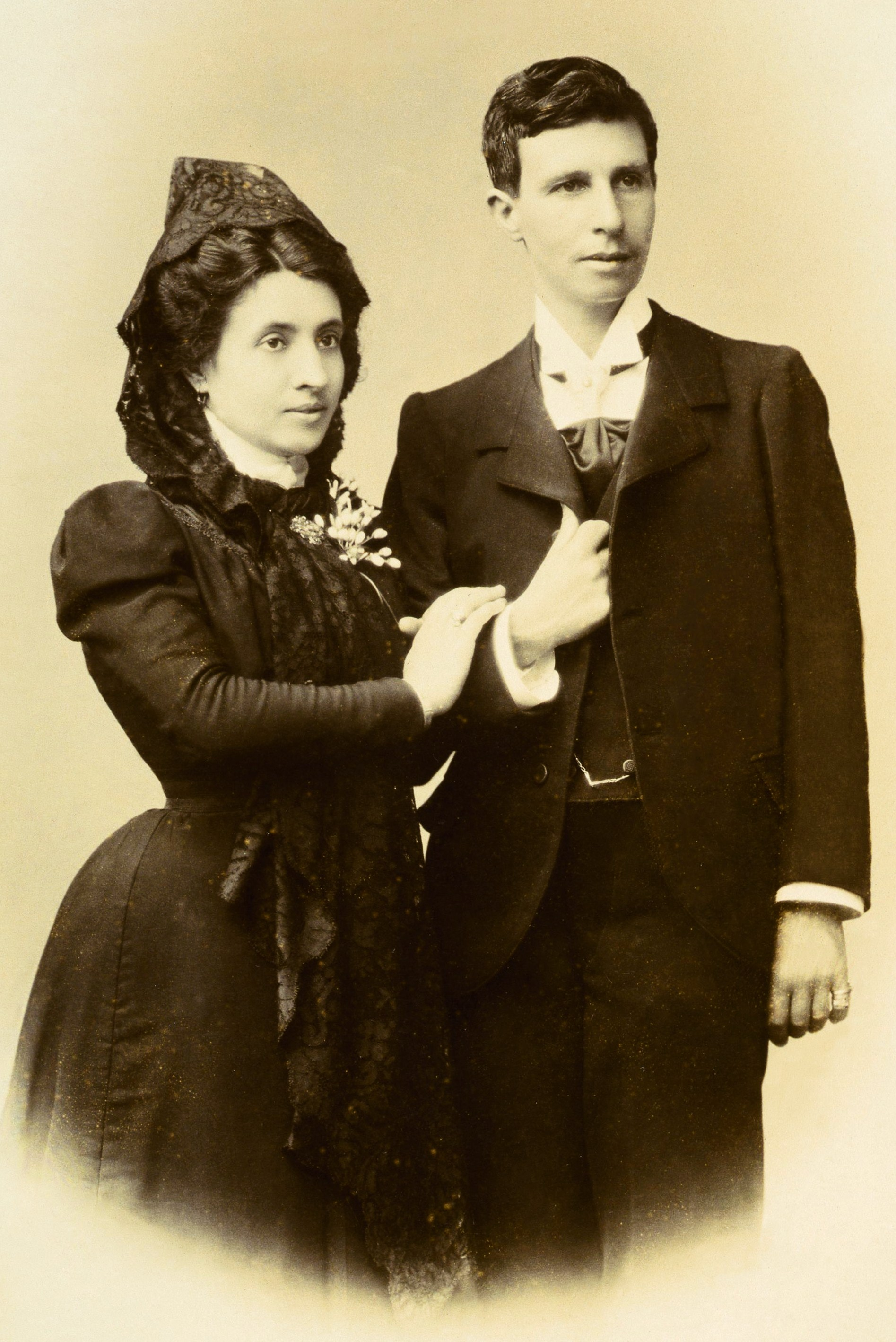
Marcela and Elisa got married in 1901 in A Coruña, with Elisa adopting a male name and appearance to pass as a man. Their marriage certificate was never annulled.

In 1822, the Kingdom of Spain's first penal code was adopted and same-sex sexual intercourse was legalised. In 1928, under the dictatorship of Miguel Primo de Rivera, the offense of "habitual homosexual acts" was recriminalised in Spain.

=== Second Spanish Republic ===
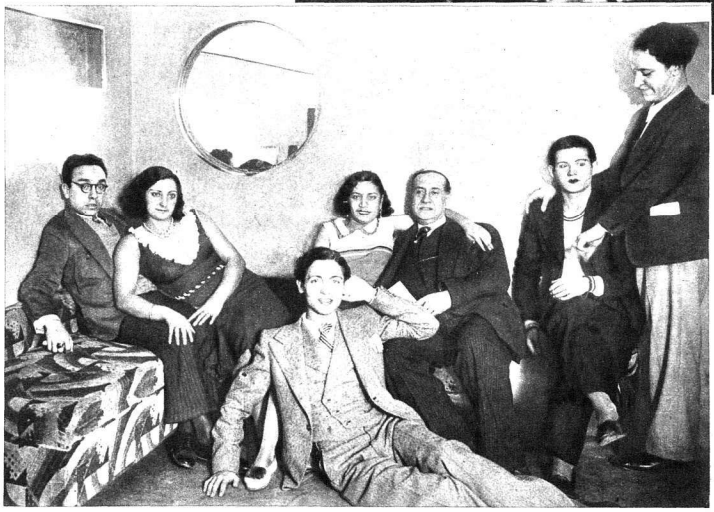
«La Criolla» Cabaret Barcelona 1933 with «Flor de Otoño», «la Asturiana», Sarah, «Trotski» y Luz.

In 1932, same-sex sexual intercourse was again legalised in Spain.

=== Francoist Spain (1936-1975) ===
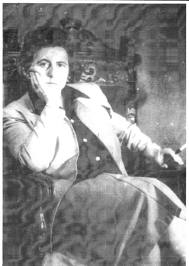
Victorina Durán created the first lesbian association in Spain, the Sapphic Circle of Madrid. She went into exile during the dictatorship.

Between 1936 and 1939, right-wing, Catholic forces led by General Francisco Franco took over Spain, and Franco was dictator of the country until his death in 1975. Legal reforms in 1944 and 1963 punished same-sex sexual intercourse as "scandalous public behavior". In 1954, vagrancy laws were modified to declare that homosexuals are "a danger", equating homosexuality with proxenetism (procuring). The text of the law declared that the measures "are not proper punishments, but mere security measures, set with a doubly preventive end, with the purpose of collective guarantee and the aspiration of correcting those subjects fallen to the lowest levels of morality. This law is not intended to punish, but to correct and reform". However, the way the law was applied was clearly punitive and arbitrary: police would often use the vagrancy laws against suspected political dissenters, using homosexuality (actual or perceived) as a way to go around the judicial guarantees.

However, in other cases, the harassment of gay, bisexual and transgender people was clearly directed at their sexual mores, and homosexuals (mostly men) were sent to special prisons called galerías de invertidos ("galleries of inverts"). Thousands of homosexual men and women were jailed, put in camps, or locked up in mental institutions under Franco's dictatorship, which lasted for 36 years until his death in 1975. The year Franco died, his regime began to give way to the current constitutional democracy, but in the early 1970s gay prisoners were overlooked by political activism in favour of more "traditional" political dissenters. Some gay activists deplored the fact that reparations were not made until 2008.

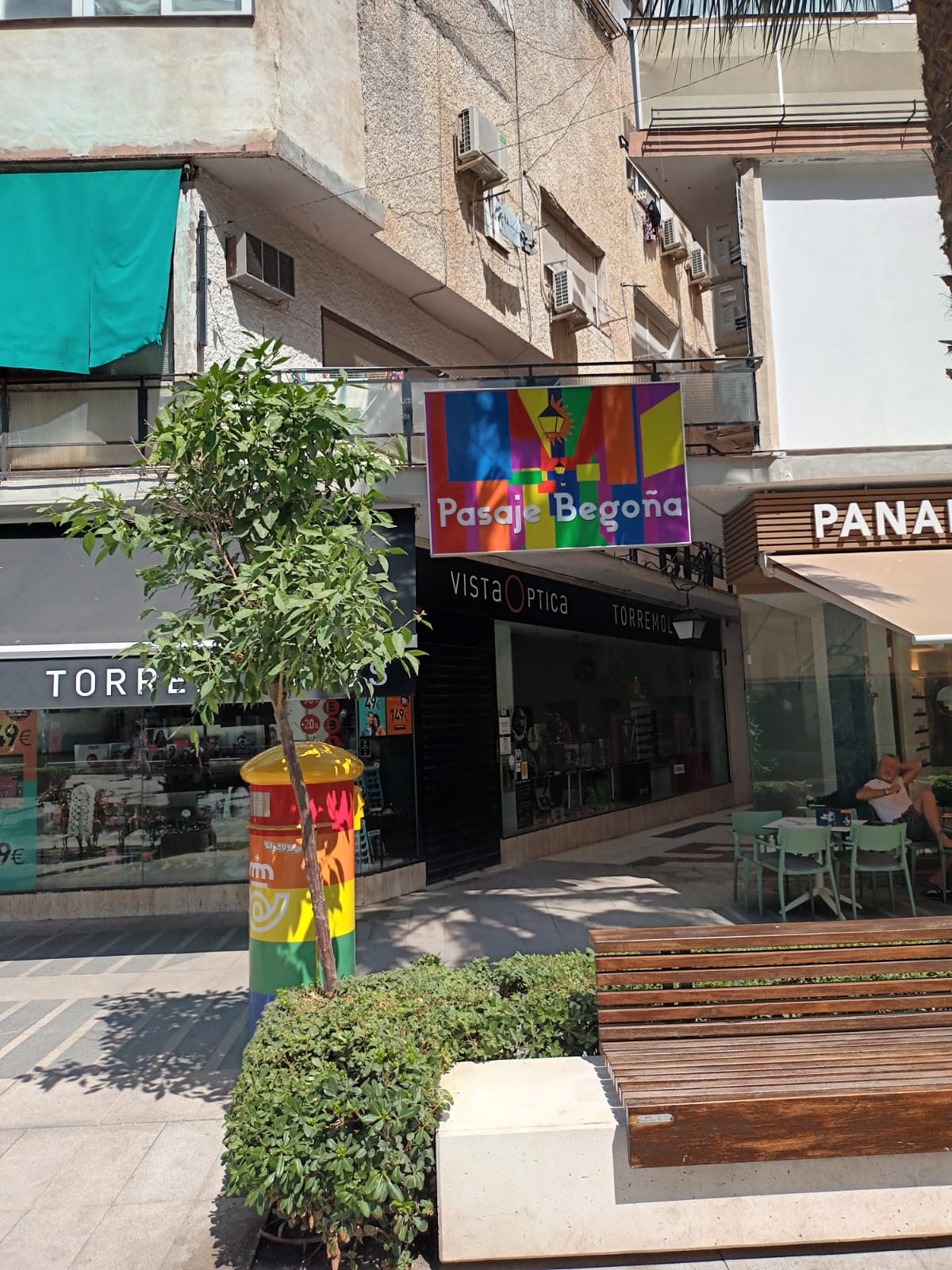
Pasaje Begoña in Torremolinos.

However, in the 1960s, a clandestine gay scene began to emerge in Barcelona, and in the countercultural centers of Ibiza and Sitges (a town in the province of Barcelona, Catalonia, that remains a highly popular gay tourist destination). In the late 1960s and the 1970s, a body of gay literature emerged in Catalan. Attitudes in greater Spain began to change with the return to democracy after Franco's death through a cultural movement known as La Movida Madrileña. This movement, along with growth of the gay rights movement in the rest of Europe and the Western world, was a large factor in making Spain today one of Europe's most socially tolerant places.

In 1970, Spanish law provided for a three-year prison sentence for those accused of same-sex sexual intercourse. That same year, the Spanish Movement for Homosexual Liberation (Spanish: Movimiento Español de Liberación Homosexual) was founded.

=== Kingdom of Spain (1975–present) ===
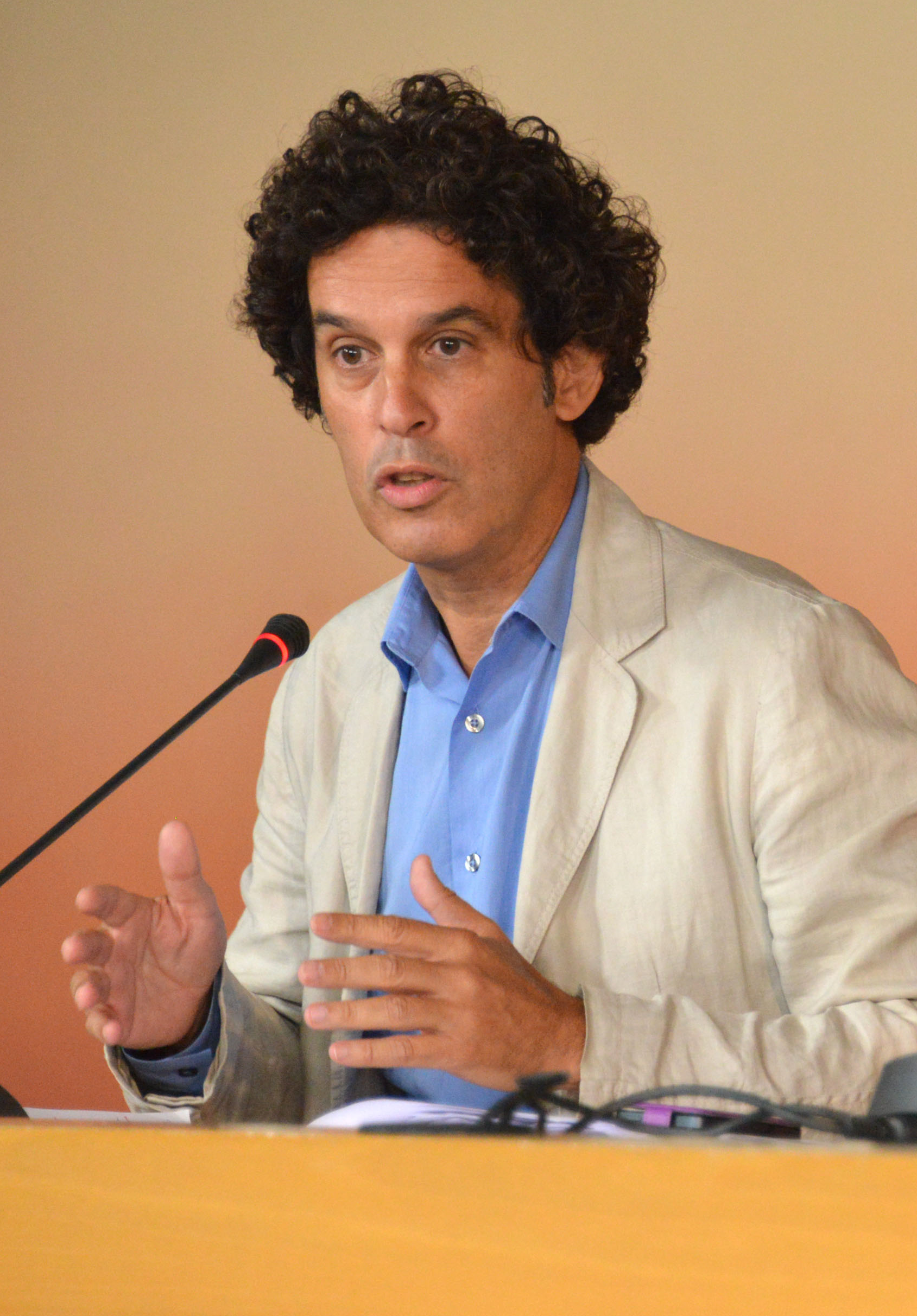
Activist Pedro Zerolo was a key figure in the campaign to extend the right to marriage and adoption to same-sex couples in the country.

Same-sex sexual intercourse was again legalised in Spain in 1979, following intense campaigns by activist groups, and this remains its legal status today. Trans people continued to be persecuted under the "public scandal" crime and municipal legislation until the end of the 1980s, and continued to face intense discrimination in the decade after that.

In December 2001, the Spanish Parliament pledged to wipe clean the criminal records of thousands of gay and bisexual men and women who were jailed during Franco's regime. The decision meant that sentences for homosexuality and bisexuality were taken off police files. Further reparations were made in 2008.

== Law regarding same-sex sexual activity ==
Same-sex sexual acts were technically lawful in Spain from 1822 to 1954, with the exception of the offence of "unusual or outrageous indecent acts with same-sex persons" between the years 1928 and 1932. However, some homosexuals were arrested under the Ley de Vagos y Maleantes ("Vagrants and Common Delinquents Law"). Homosexual acts were made unlawful during Francisco Franco's time in power, first by an amendment to the aforementioned law in 1954, and later by the Ley de Peligrosidad y Rehabilitación Social ("Law on Danger and Social Rehabilitation") in 1970. In 1979, the Adolfo Suárez Government reversed the prohibition of homosexual acts.

A new penal code was introduced in Spain in 1995 which specified an age of consent of 12 for all sexual acts, but this was raised to 13 in 1999 and to 16 in 2015.

== Recognition of same-sex relationships ==
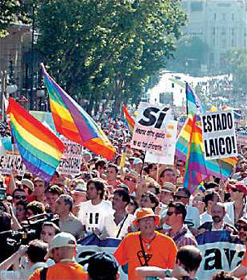
Gay Pride 2005 celebrating the legalisation of same-sex marriage in Spain

In 1994, the Ley de Arrendamientos Urbanos was passed, giving same-sex couples some recognition rights. Registries for same-sex couples were created in all of Spain's 17 autonomous communities: Catalonia (1998), Aragon (1999), Navarre (2000), Castile-La Mancha (2000), Valencia (2001), the Balearic Islands (2001), Madrid (2001), Asturias (2002), Andalusia (2002), Castile and León (2002), Extremadura (2003), the Basque Country (2003), the Canary Islands (2003), Cantabria (2005), Galicia (2008), La Rioja (2010) and Murcia (2018), and in both autonomous cities; Ceuta (1998) and Melilla (2008). These registries grant unmarried couples some benefits, but the effect is mainly symbolic.

Same-sex marriage and adoption were legalised by the Cortes Generales under the administration of Socialist Prime Minister José Luis Rodríguez Zapatero in 2005, making Spain the third country in the world to do so.

Soon after the same-sex marriage bill became law, a member of the Guardia Civil, a military-police force, married his lifelong partner, prompting the organisation to allow same-sex partners to cohabitate in the barracks, the first police force in Europe to accommodate a same-sex partner in a military installation.

== Adoption and parenting ==
Adoption by same-sex couples has been legal nationwide in Spain since July 2005. Some of Spain's autonomous communities had already legalised such adoptions beforehand, notably Navarre in 2000, the Basque Country in 2003, Aragon in 2004, Catalonia in 2005 and Cantabria in 2005. Furthermore, in Asturias, Andalusia and Extremadura, same-sex couples could jointly begin procedures to temporarily or permanently take children in care.

Since 2015, married lesbian couples can register both their names on their child(ren)'s certificates. This does not apply to cohabiting couples or couples in de facto unions, where the non-biological mother must normally go through an adoption process to be legally recognized as the child's mother.

Lesbian couples and single women may access in vitro fertilisation (IVF) and assisted reproductive treatments. Prior to 2019, this was mostly in the private sector, where such treatments were much more expensive (around 7,500 euros for IVF). In 2018, following reports that Spain had one of the lowest birth rates in Europe (with reportedly more deaths than births in 2017), measures extending free reproductive treatments for lesbians and single women to public hospitals were announced. The measures took effect in January 2019. Surrogacy is prohibited in Spain regardless of sexual orientation, though surrogacy arrangements undertaken overseas are usually recognized.

In November 2021, an executive order was signed to allow free IVF treatment for single women and women in same-sex relationships throughout Spain. The right of single women and women in same-sex relationships to access IVF was enshrined in law as part of the "Trans Law" passed by congress on 16 February 2023.

== Discrimination protections ==
Map indicating the implementation of anti-discrimination laws based on sexual orientation and gender identity across different autonomous communities in Spain. Ban on discrimination based on sexual orientation and gender identity under both Spain's national law and autonomous community laws Ban on discrimination based on sexual orientation and gender identity through Spain's nationwide law

Spanish law prohibits discrimination on the basis of sexual orientation, gender identity, HIV status, and "any other personal or social condition or circumstance." in employment and provision of goods and services. A comprehensive anti-discrimination bill, called the Zerolo Law, was passed by the Cortes Generales on 30 June 2022.

Prior to the Zerolo law, employment discrimination on the basis of sexual orientation had been illegal in the country since 1995 but employment discrimination on the basis of gender identity was not banned nationwide. The first autonomous community to ban such discrimination was Navarre in 2009. The Basque Country followed suit in 2012, Andalusia, the Canary Islands, Catalonia, and Galicia in 2014, Extremadura in 2015, Murcia, and the Balearic Islands in 2016, Valencia in April 2017, and Aragon in January 2019., Cantabria in November 2020 La Rioja in February 2022 and Castilla-La Mancha in May 2022.

The autonomous community of Madrid previously had a non-discrimination law, but it was repealed by a newly elected far-right government in 2023.

Article 4(2) of the Workers' Statute (Spanish: Estatuto de los trabajadores) (Note: Catalan: Estatut dels treballadors; Galician: Estatuto dos traballadores; Basque: Langileen Estatutua; Asturian: Estatutu de los trabayadores) reads as follows:

In labour relations, workers have the right: ... not to be directly or indirectly discriminated in employment, or, once employed, discriminated by reason of sex, civil status, age within the limits set forth by this Law, racial or ethnic origin, social status, religion or convictions, political ideas, sexual orientation, membership or non-membership in a union, or for reasons of language within the Spanish State.

Discrimination in the provisions of goods and services based on sexual orientation and gender identity was not banned nationwide either. The aforementioned autonomous communities all ban such discrimination within their anti-discrimination laws. Discrimination in health services and education based on sexual orientation and gender identity has been banned in Spain since 2011 and 2013, respectively.

Ten autonomous communities also ban discrimination based on sex characteristics, thereby protecting intersex people from discrimination. These autonomous communities are Galicia (2014), Catalonia (2014), Extremadura (2015), the Balearic Islands (2016), Madrid (2016), Murcia (2016), Valencia (2017), Navarre (2017), Andalusia (2018), and Aragon (2019).

=== Bias-motivated speech and violence ===
Hate speech on the basis of both sexual orientation and gender identity has been banned since 1995. Additionally, under the country's hate crime law, crimes motivated by the victim's sexual orientation or gender identity, amongst other categories, result in additional legal penalties.

The Secretary of State for Security reported that instances of violence against LGBT people decreased 4% in 2018. This contrasted with figures from other sources. The Observatorio Madrileño reported a 7% increase in anti-LGBT violence in Madrid, while the Observatory Against Homophobia of Catalonia (Observatori contra l'Homofòbia) reported a 30% increase in the first few months of 2019.

Since January 2019, teachers and students in Madrid are obliged to report cases of bullying, including against LGBT students.

== Military service ==
Lesbian, gay, bisexual and transgender people may serve openly in the Spanish Armed Forces.

== Transgender and intersex rights ==
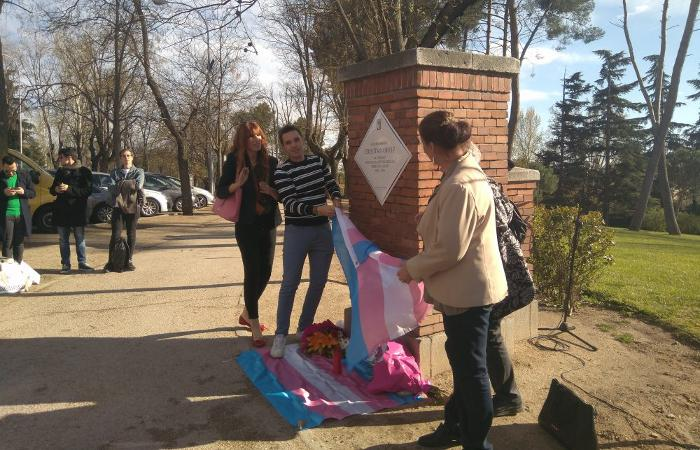
Commemorative plaque in Madrid to La Veneno, a transgender woman visible on Spanish television in the 1990s

In November 2006, the Zapatero Government passed a law that allows transgender people to register under their preferred sex in public documents such as birth certificates, identity cards and passports without undergoing prior surgical change. However a professional diagnosis is still required. The law came into effect on 17 March 2007. In July 2019, the Constitutional Court of Spain declared that prohibiting transgender minors from accessing legal gender changes is unconstitutional. The court ruled that transgender minors who are "mature enough" may register their new sex on their identity cards, and struck down the article of the 2007 legislation that limited this possibility only to those over 18. The first minor to change his legal gender did so in December 2019.

A new bill was approved in June 2022 by the Spanish government that would allow trans people to "self-identify" their gender on national birth certificates and grant permission for people above 16 to change their gender without restrictions and without needing to undergo psychological and medical evaluations, and for people between 12 and 16 under certain conditions. (Note: Teenagers between 14 and 16 could do so by requesting approval from their parents (or from a judge if they cannot agree); teenagers between 12 and 14 would require judicial authorisation.) The bill was promoted by the left-wing Unidas Podemos party, but its approval was initially delayed because the Spanish Socialist Workers' Party opposed, questioning the bill's treatment of transgender teenagers and expressing concerns that it may cause gender inequality. The dispute was resolved when Carmen Calvo, the then Vice President of the government, left the Executive. Congress gave final approval to the bill on 16 February 2023 by a vote of 191–60 with 91 abstentions.

Map of gender identity laws in Spain's autonomous communities. ■ Purple: Law allows self-determination of gender identity ■ Blue: Law requires medical diagnosis to change gender identity ■ Grey: Law does not recognize trans identity

Many of Spain's autonomous communities have their own laws which allow trans people to change their legal gender identity. Catalonia (since 2014), Andalucía (since 2014), Valencia (since 2014), Extremadura (since 2015), Balearic Islands (since 2016), Madrid (2016–2023), Murcia (since 2016), Navarre (since 2017), Aragón (since 2018), Basque Country (since 2019), Cantabria (since 2020), Canary Islands (since 2021), La Rioja (since 2022), and Castilla-La Mancha (since 2022) allow trans people to self-declare their gender identity. In Galicia, a gender change requires a medical diagnosis.

In 2023, a new right-wing government in Madrid repealed several legal protections and recognitions for trans people. Trans people may now only have their legal gender updated on ID after it has been recognized on national documents.

Intersex infants in Spain may not be given unnecessary medical interventions to have their sex characteristics altered after the passage of the Trans Law on 16 February 2023. Previous to that, it had been banned in several autonomous communities: Andalusia, Aragon, the Balearic Islands, Extremadura, Madrid, Murcia, Navarre, and Valencia. Human rights groups consider these surgeries unnecessary and, they argue, should only be performed if the applicant consents to the operation (i.e. has reached the age of 18). In April 2019, the Catalan Department of Labor, Social Affairs and Families announced that official documents in Catalonia would include the option "non-binary" alongside male and female.

== Blood donation ==
Men who have sex with men (MSM) are allowed to donate blood in Spain. For anyone regardless of sexual orientation, the deferral period is six months following the start of a new sexual partnership.

== Conversion therapy ==
Map of conversion therapy bans by autonomous community in Spain before the 2023 and 2026 nationwide legislation. ■ (Dark Blue) Comprehensive conversion therapy ban ■ (Light Blue) Only medical professionals are banned from performing conversion therapy

Congress passed a nationwide ban on conversion therapy as part of the "Trans Act" on 16 February 2023, and in 2026 it passed a new ban establishing prison sentences of up to two years for those practising them. Previously, conversion therapy had been banned or restricted in several autonomous communities.

The autonomous community of Madrid approved a conversion therapy ban in July 2016. The ban went into effect on 1 January 2017, and applies to medical, psychiatric, psychological and religious groups. In August 2016, an LGBT advocacy group brought charges under the new law against a Madrid woman who offered conversion therapy. In September 2019, the woman was fined 20,000 euros. In December 2023, a newly elected right-wing government repealed Madrid's conversion therapy ban in so far as it applies to trans people, and removed any penalties for conversion therapy.

Murcia approved a conversion therapy ban in May 2016, which came into effect on 1 June 2016. Unlike the other bans, the Murcia ban only applies to health professionals. Navarre, the Balearic Islands, and Catalonia have also passed similarly limited conversion therapy bans. Valencia banned the use of conversion therapies in April 2017. Andalusia followed suit in December 2017, with the law coming into force on 4 February 2018. In January 2019, Aragon made it an offense to promote and/or perform conversion therapy. The autonomous communities of Canary Islands, Cantabria, Castilla-La Mancha and La Rioja also have conversion therapy bans.

In April 2019, the Government of the Community of Madrid announced it was investigating the Roman Catholic Diocese of Alcalá de Henares for violating conversion therapy laws. This followed reports that a journalist named Ángel Villascusa posed as a gay man and attended a counselling service provided by the diocese. Villascusa alleged the bishop was running illegal conversion therapy sessions. The bishop was defended by the Catholic Church in Spain. Minister of Health, Consumer Affairs and Social Welfare María Luisa Carcedo called for a nationwide ban on conversion therapy. She said, "they [the Church] are breaking the law therefore, in the first instance, these courses have to be completely abolished. I thought that, in Spain, accepting the various sexual orientations was assumed in all areas, but unfortunately we see that there are still pockets where people are told what their sexual orientation should be". The association No es Terapia focuses on combatting these practices in the country.

== LGBT rights movement in Spain ==
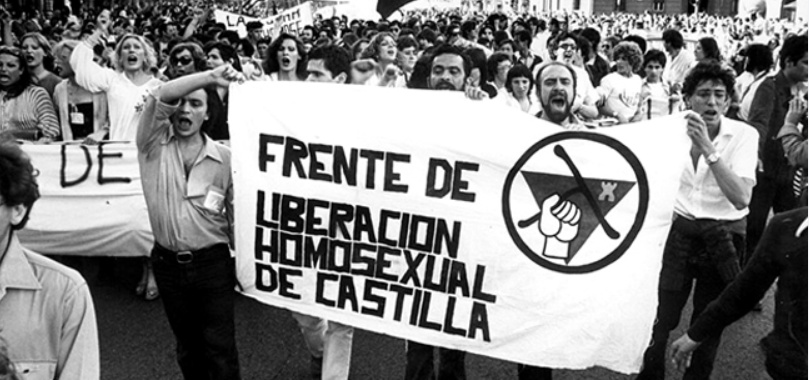
Demonstration by the Frente de Liberación Homosexual de Castilla, Madrid (1978).

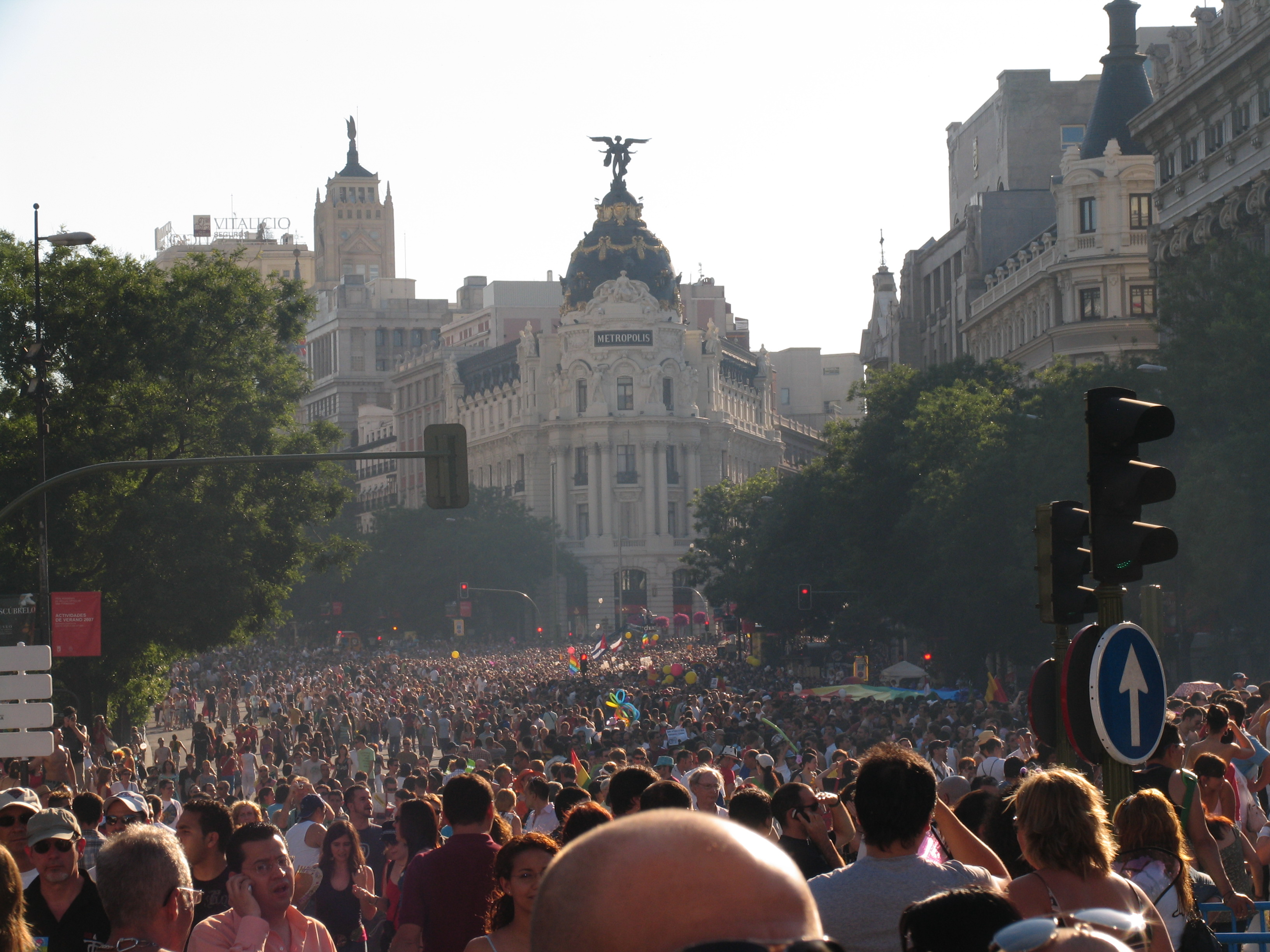
Europride 2007 in Madrid.

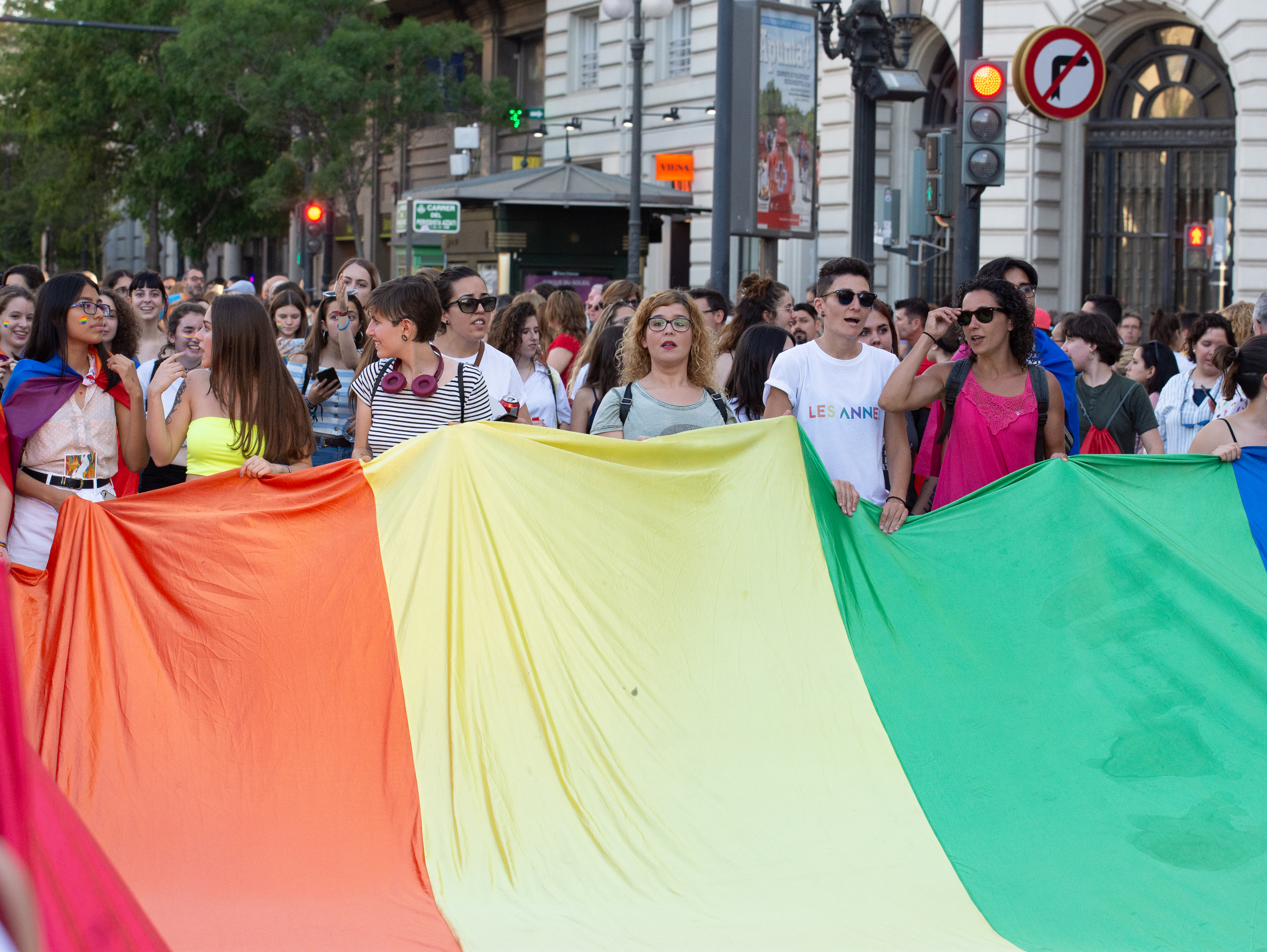
Pride in Valencia, 2019

The first gay organisation in Spain was the Spanish Homosexual Liberation Movement (MELH, Movimiento Español de Liberación Homosexual, Moviment Espanyol d'Alliberament Homosexual), which was founded in 1970 in Barcelona. The group also established centers in Madrid and Bilbao. It disbanded in 1973 because of police pressure, but following Franco's death, several members of the group formed the Front d'Alliberament Gai de Catalunya (FAGC) in 1975 to continue campaigning for sexual liberation. Several more groups were established, including the Euskal Herriko Gay-Les Askapen Mugimendua in the Basque Country, the Unión Democrática de Homosexuales de Málaga in Malaga Frente Homosexual de Acción Revolucionaria in Madrid. In 1977 the first nationwide platform, the Coordinadora de Frentes de Liberación Homosexual de Estado Español (COFLHEE), was formed. On 28 June 1977, the FAGC organised the first gay demonstration in Spain in the city of Barcelona with about 4,000 to 5,000 participants. Police repressed the event, with several arrests and injuries. Exactly one year later, the Frente de Liberación Homosexual de Castilla held a demonstration in Madrid with about 10,000 people, and other groups held marches in Bilbao and Seville. Similar marches and rallies would be held in the coming years in cities like Vigo and Valencia. Disagreement within these groups caused different splits, including the departure of lesbian women to join feminist groups and the formation of more radical groups opposing the institutionalization of the movement. Gay liberation groups saw an important landmark moment in 1979 with the decriminalisation of homosexuality.

During the 1980s, several gay and lesbian groups and magazines were launched in various cities, but the movement experimented a significant decline in numbers as a new gay commercial scene emerged. The 1990s saw the birth of a more reform-oriented movement, represented by Madrid's COGAM, Barcelona's CGL and the nationwide platform Federación Estatal de Lesbianas, Gays, Transexuales y Bisexuales (FELGTB), which was founded in 1992 replacing COFLHEE. These groups campaigned for legal rights for same-sex couples and LGBT people, societal acceptance, operated counseling centers about topics such as coming out, sex, relationships or health issues, and organized marches and rallies. They boomed in the early 2000s with the passing of equal marriage and adoption legislation (as well as mainstream visibility and a piece of trans legislation) under the first mandate of José Luis Rodríguez Zapatero. New gay villages emerged from the 1990s onwards, most notably Chueca in Madrid, "Gaixample" in Barcelona, which joined more traditional gay spots like Sitges, Torremolinos, Ibiza, and Maspalomas in Gran Canaria.

Nowadays, there are several regional organizations that fight for the rights of the LGBTQ people across Spain such as the Bolo-Bolo in the Castilla-La Mancha region. Numerous pride parades and other LGBT festivals are held throughout Spain, including Madrid Pride, whose 2019 edition had 400,000 participants according to police, Barcelona, Gran Canaria, Seville, Bilbao, A Coruña, Valencia, Zaragoza, Murcia, Palma de Mallorca, Cartagena, Valladolid, Benidorm, Ibiza, Sitges, Maspalomas, Torremolinos, and many more. In the 2020s a new wave of organizations and festivals emerged to defend rural queer realities across the country.

== Public opinion ==
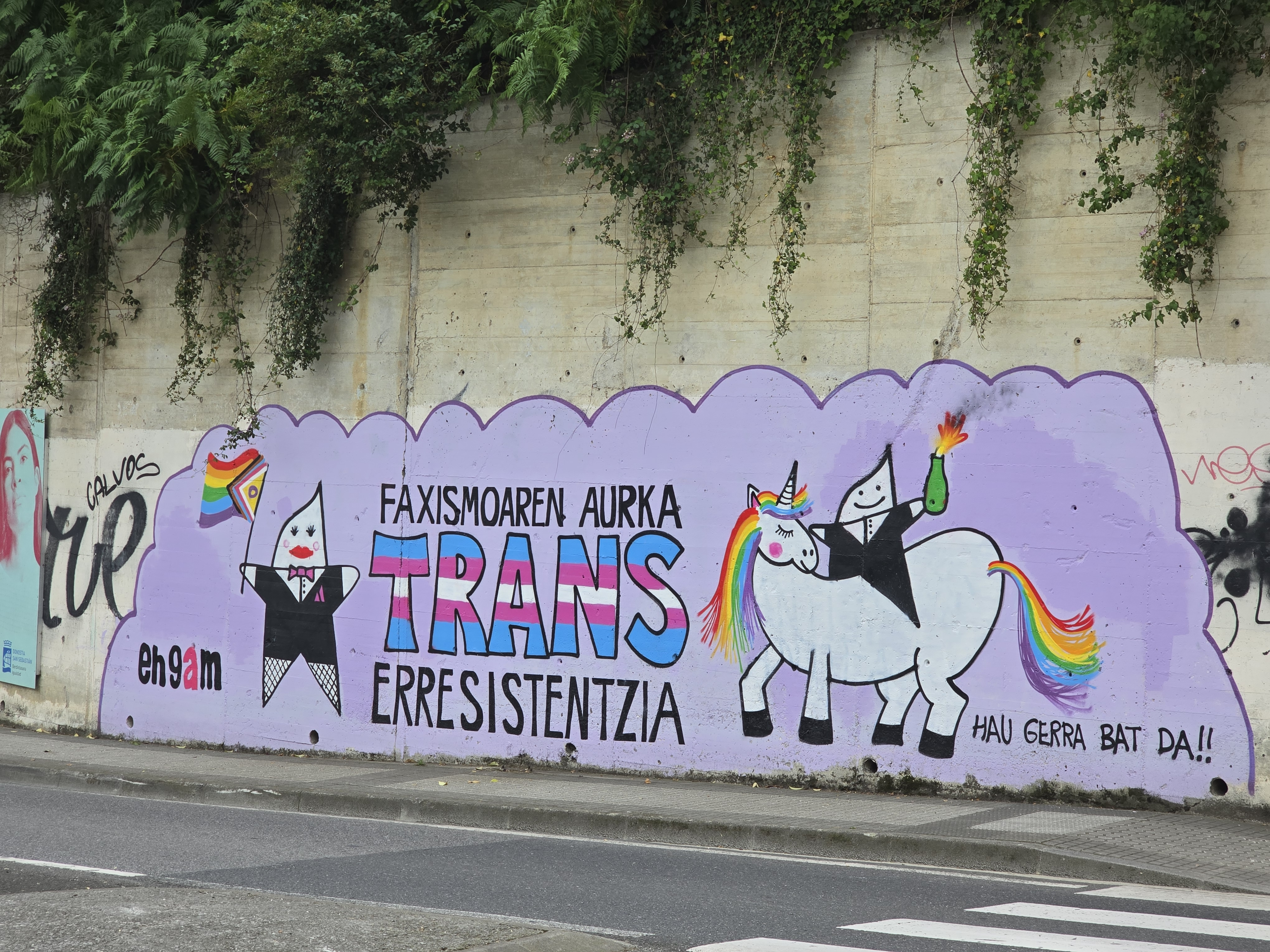
Euskal Herriko Gay-Les Askapen Mugimendua mural in San Sebastián calling for transgender resistance to fascism.

Homosexuality and bisexuality today are greatly accepted all around the country and intensely in larger and medium cities. That being said, a certain level of discrimination can still be encountered in small villages and among some parts of society. A Eurobarometer survey published December 2006 showed that 66 percent of Spanish people surveyed supported same-sex marriage and 43 percent supported same-sex couples' right to adopt (EU-wide averages were 44 percent and 33 percent, respectively).

On 4 March 2013, Interior Minister Jorge Fernández Díaz said that due to same-sex marriages the survival of the human species is not guaranteed. He also stated that same-sex marriages should not have the same protection under the law as opposite-sex ones, eight years after same-sex marriage was legalized.

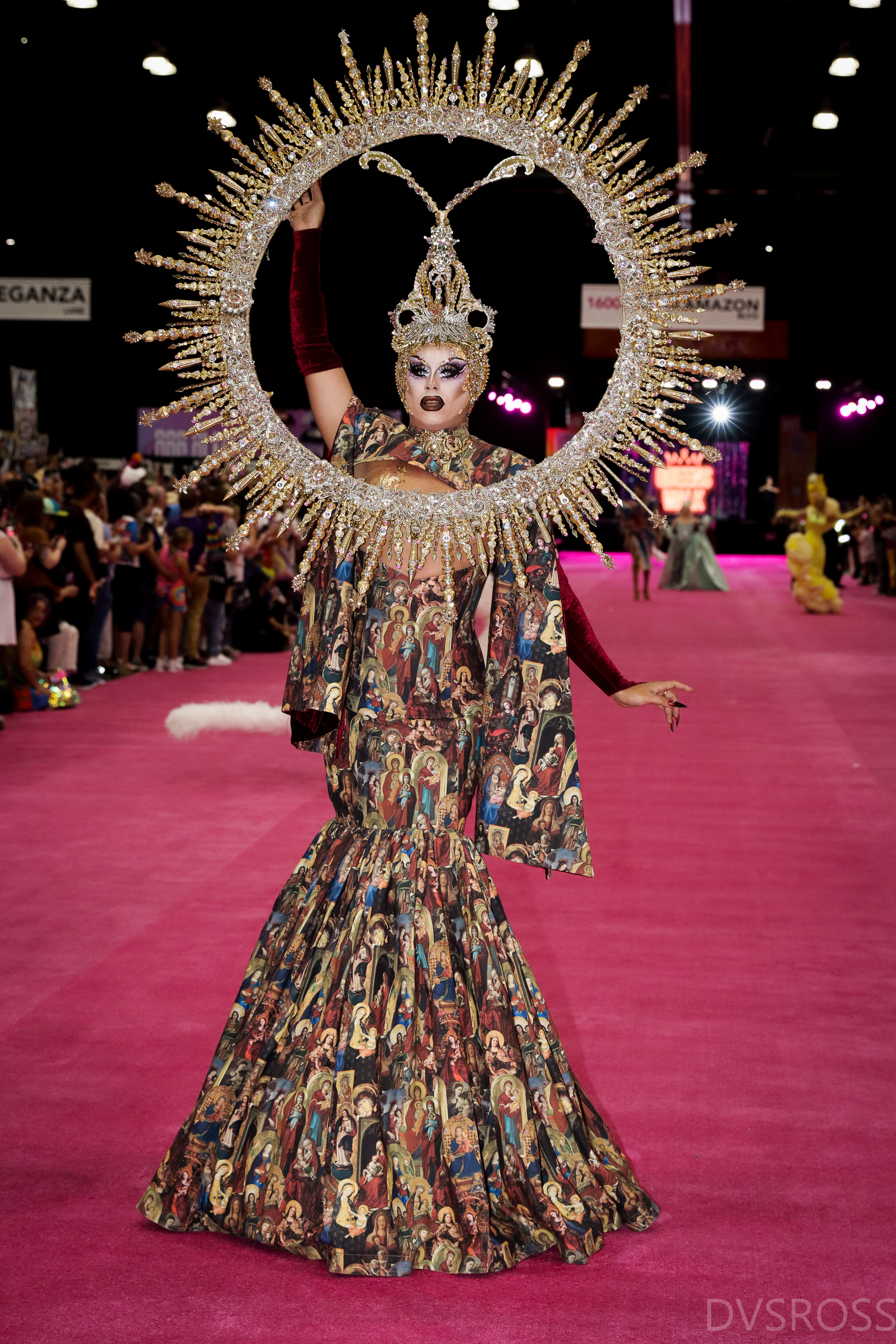
Drag Sethlas, winner in 2017 and 2020 of the Drag Contest in Carnival of Las Palmas and winner of Drag Race España All Stars Season 1.

Among the countries studied by the Pew Research Center in 2013, Spain was rated first in acceptance of homosexuality, with 88% of Spaniards believing that homosexuality should be accepted by society, compared to 11% who disagreed.

In May 2015, PlanetRomeo, an LGBT social network, published its first Gay Happiness Index (GHI). Gay men from over 120 countries were asked about how they feel about society's view on homosexuality, how do they experience the way they are treated by other people and how satisfied are they with their lives. Spain was ranked 13th with a GHI score of 68.

BuzzFeed conducted a poll in December 2016 across several countries on the acceptance of transgender individuals. Spain ranked the most accepting in most categories, with 87% of those polled believing transgender people should be protected from discrimination, and only 8% believing there is something mentally or physically wrong with them. In addition, 77% believed transgender people should be allowed to use the bathroom that matches their gender identity rather than being forced to use the one of their birth-assigned gender, with over 50% strongly agreeing with this.

The 2015 Eurobarometer found that 84% of Spaniards thought that same-sex marriage should be allowed throughout Europe, 10% were against. The 2019 Eurobarometer showed that 91% of Spaniards believed gay and bisexual people should enjoy the same rights as heterosexual people, and 86% supported same-sex marriage.

The 2023 Eurobarometer found that 88% of Spaniards thought same-sex marriage should be allowed throughout Europe, and 89% agreed that "there is nothing wrong in a sexual relationship between two persons of the same sex".

== LGBT culture ==
=== Literature ===
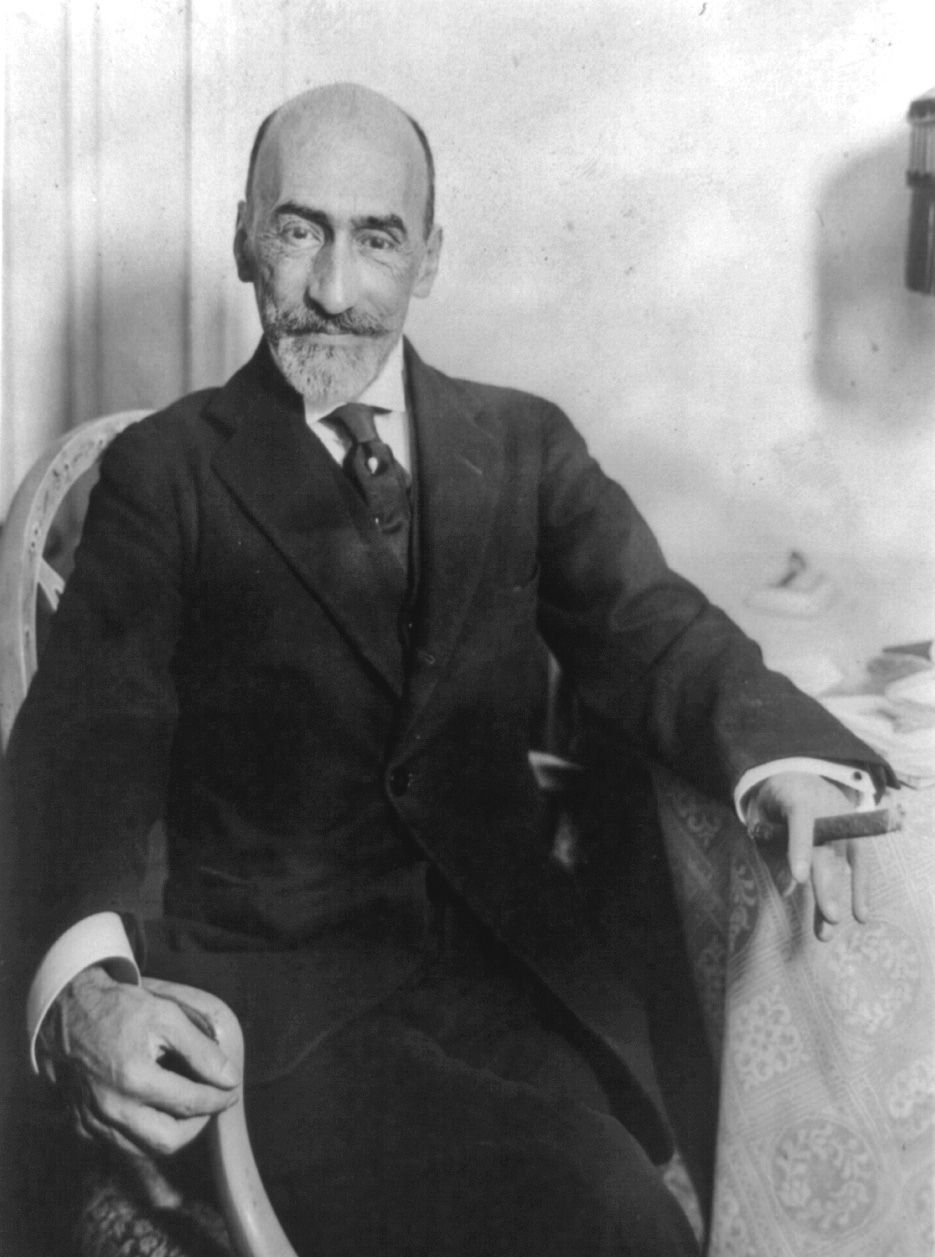
Jacinto Benavente, Nobel Prize in Literature

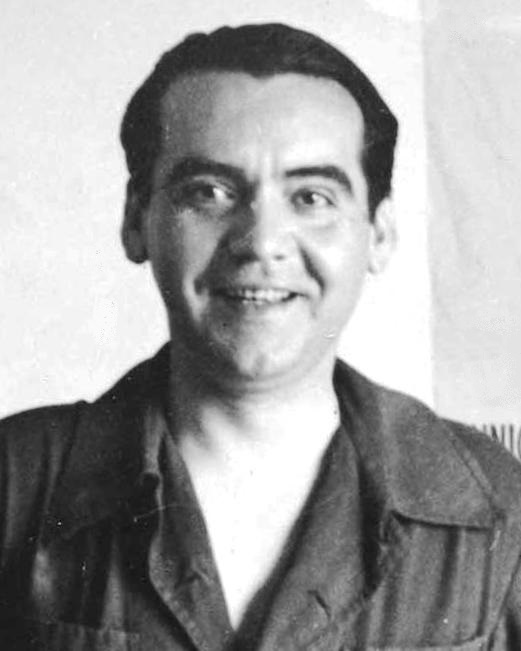
Federico García Lorca in 1932

At the beginning of the 20th century, Spanish authors, like Jacinto Benavente, Pedro de Répide and Antonio de Hoyos y Vinent, had to choose between ignoring the subject of homosexuality or representing it negatively. The only authors publishing literature with LGBT content were foreigners: Augusto d'Halmar from Chile published Pasión y muerte del cura Deusto, Alfonso Hernández Catá from Cuba published El ángel de Sodoma, and Alberto Nin Frías from Uruguay published La novela del renacimiento y otros relatos, La fuente envenenada, Marcos, amador de la belleza, Alexis o el significado del temperamento Urano and, in 1933, Homosexualismo creador, the first essay representing homosexuality in a positive light.

Others, such as the authors of the Generation of '27, took refuge in poetry. The gay and bisexual poets of this literary movement were amongst the most influential in Spanish literature: Federico García Lorca, Emilio Prados, Luis Cernuda, Vicente Aleixandre and Manuel Altolaguirre. These poets were highly influenced by the great gay authors of the rest of Europe, such as Oscar Wilde, André Gide, mainly his Corydon, and Marcel Proust. In 1930, Emilio García Gómez also published his Poemas arabigoandaluces, which included the pederastic poets of Al-Andalus. Around the mid-1930s, there was a slight liberalisation which ended with the beginning of the Spanish Civil War. After the Civil War, with García Lorca assassinated and the majority of gay and bisexual poets in exile, gay culture retired anew to the cryptic poetry of Vicente Aleixandre, who never admitted his homosexuality publicly. Other gay poets of this period are Francisco Brines, Leopoldo María Panero, Juan Gil-Albert and Jaime Gil de Biedma and, in Córdoba, Vicente Núñez, Pablo García Baena and Juan Bernier, belonging to the Cántico group.

Authors that appear after the Spanish Transition include Juan Goytisolo, Luis Antonio de Villena, Antonio Gala, Terenci Moix, Álvaro Pombo, Vicente Molina Foix, Antonio Roig, Biel Mesquida, Leopoldo Alas, Vicente García Cervera, Carlos Sanrune, Jaume Cela, Eduardo Mendicutti, Miguel Martín, Lluis Fernández, Víctor Monserrat, Alberto Cardín, Mariano García Torres, Agustín Gómez-Arcos, Óscar Esquivias, Luisgé Martín and Iñaki Echarte.

No lesbian authors in Spain publicly acknowledged their homosexuality until the 1990s. Gloria Fuertes never wanted her sexual orientation to be public. The first lesbian author to be openly gay was Andrea Luca. Other authors who have treated love between women in their books include Ana María Moix, Ana Rosetti, Esther Tusquets, Carmen Riera, Elena Fortún, Isabel Franc and Lucía Etxebarría, whose novel Beatriz y los cuerpos celestes won the Nadal Prize in 1998.

=== Cinema and television ===
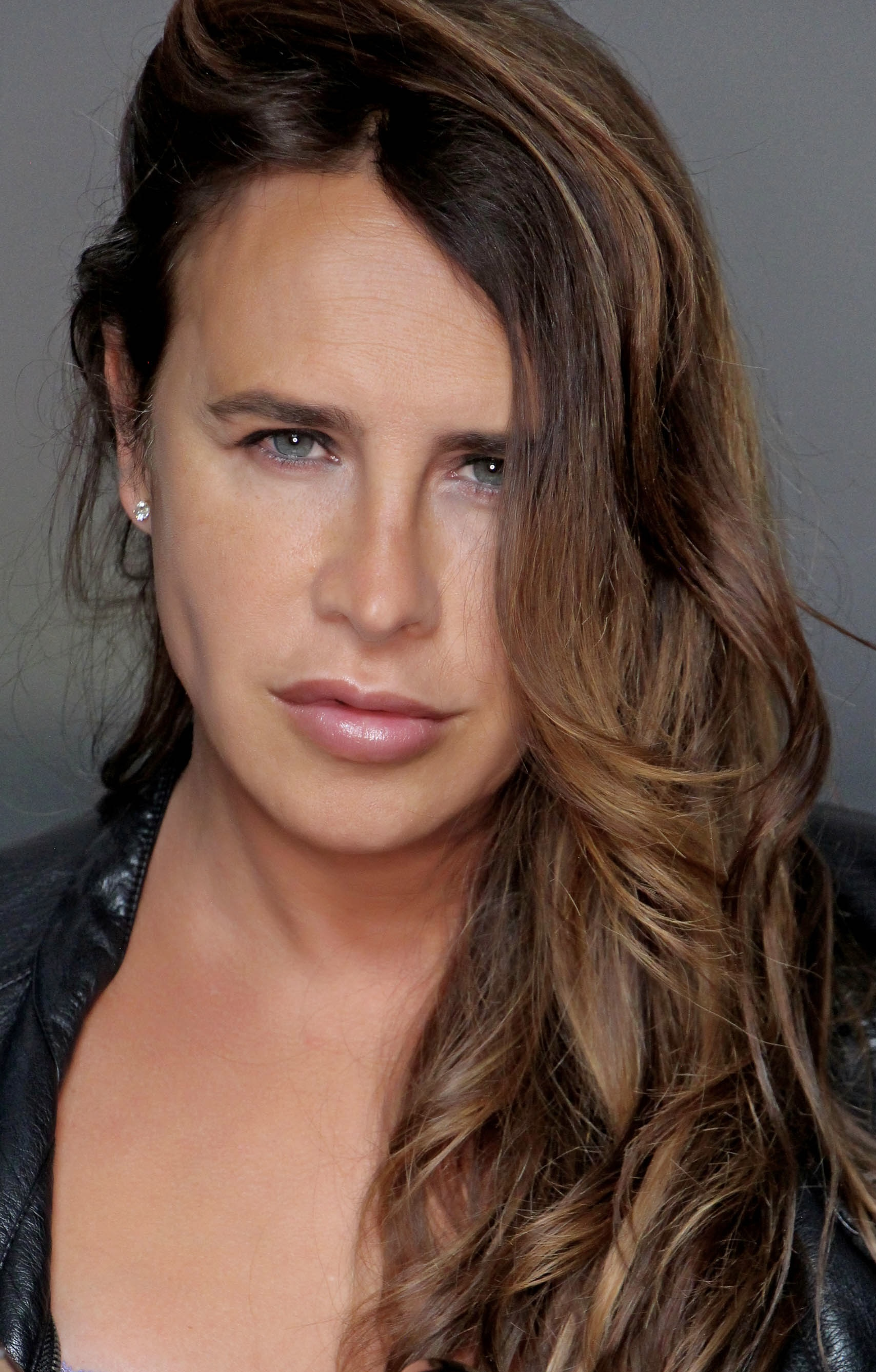
Karla Sofía Gascón.

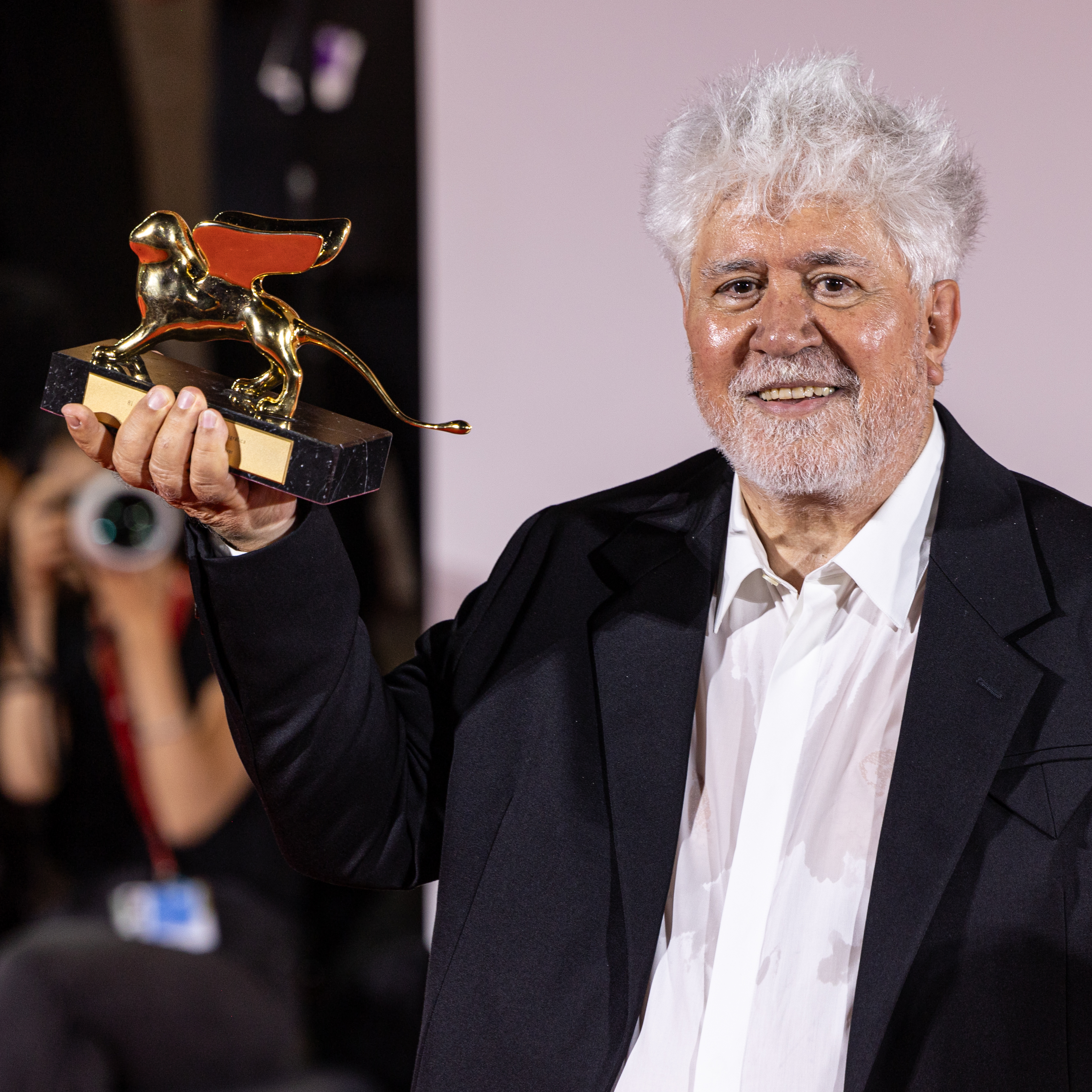
Almodóvar receiving the Golden Lion for The Room Next Door (2024)

Early representation of homosexuality in Spanish cinema was difficult due to censorship by the Franco regime. The first movie that shows any kind of homosexuality, very discreetly, was Diferente, a musical from 1961, directed by Luis María Delgado. Up to 1977, if homosexuals appeared at all, it was to ridicule them as the "funny effeminate faggot".

During the Spanish transition to democracy, the first films appeared where homosexuality was not portrayed in a negative way. Examples are La Muerte de Mikel from Imanol Uribe and Ocaña, retrat intermittent from Ventura Pons. In these films, authors experiment with different visions of gay men: the transvestite in Un hombre llamado Flor de Otoño (1978), the manly and attractive gay man in Los placeres ocultos (1976) from Eloy de la Iglesia, the warring "queen" in Gay Club (1980), etc. Homosexuality is the center of the plot, and homosexuals are shown as vulnerable, in inner turmoil and in dispute with society.

Beginning in 1985, homosexuality loses primacy on the plot, in spite of still being fundamental. This trend begins with La ley del deseo (1987) from Pedro Almodóvar and continues with films like Tras el cristal (1986) from Agustí Villaronga, Las cosas del querer (1989) and Las cosas del querer 2 (1995) from Jaime Chávarri. Successful films include Perdona bonita, pero Lucas me quería a mí (1997), Segunda piel (1999), Km. 0 (2000), Plata quemada (2000), Los novios búlgaros (2003) and Cachorro (2004).

Undoubtedly, Spain's best-known LGBT person is Pedro Almodóvar. Almodóvar has often intertwined LGBT themes in his plots, and his films have turned him into one of the most renowned Spanish movie directors. Apart from Almodóvar, Ventura Pons and Eloy de la Iglesia are two film directors who have worked on more LGBT themes in their movies. In September 2004, movie director Alejandro Amenábar publicly announced his homosexuality.

There have not been as many Spanish films with a lesbian plot. The most renown may be the comedy A mi madre le gustan las mujeres (2002), and the romantic drama Room in Rome (Habitación en Roma) (2010).

The most-important LGBT film festivals are LesGaiCineMad in Madrid and the Festival internacional de cinema gai i lèsbic de Barcelona (FICGLB). There are also many other smaller festivals and shows, including Festival del Mar in the Balearic Islands, Festival del Sol in the Canary Islands, Zinegoak in Bilbao, LesGaiFestiVal in Valencia or Zinentiendo in Zaragoza.

In 2018, Ángela Ponce became the first transgender woman to win the Miss Universe Spain title, and was the first transgender woman to contest for Miss Universe 2018.

=== Music ===
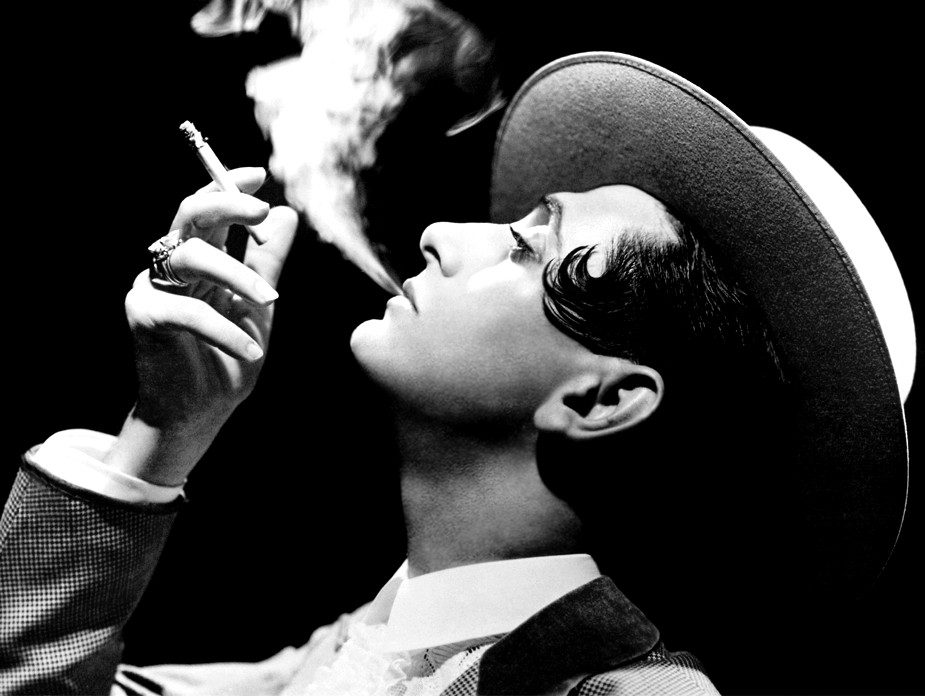
Miguel de Molina.

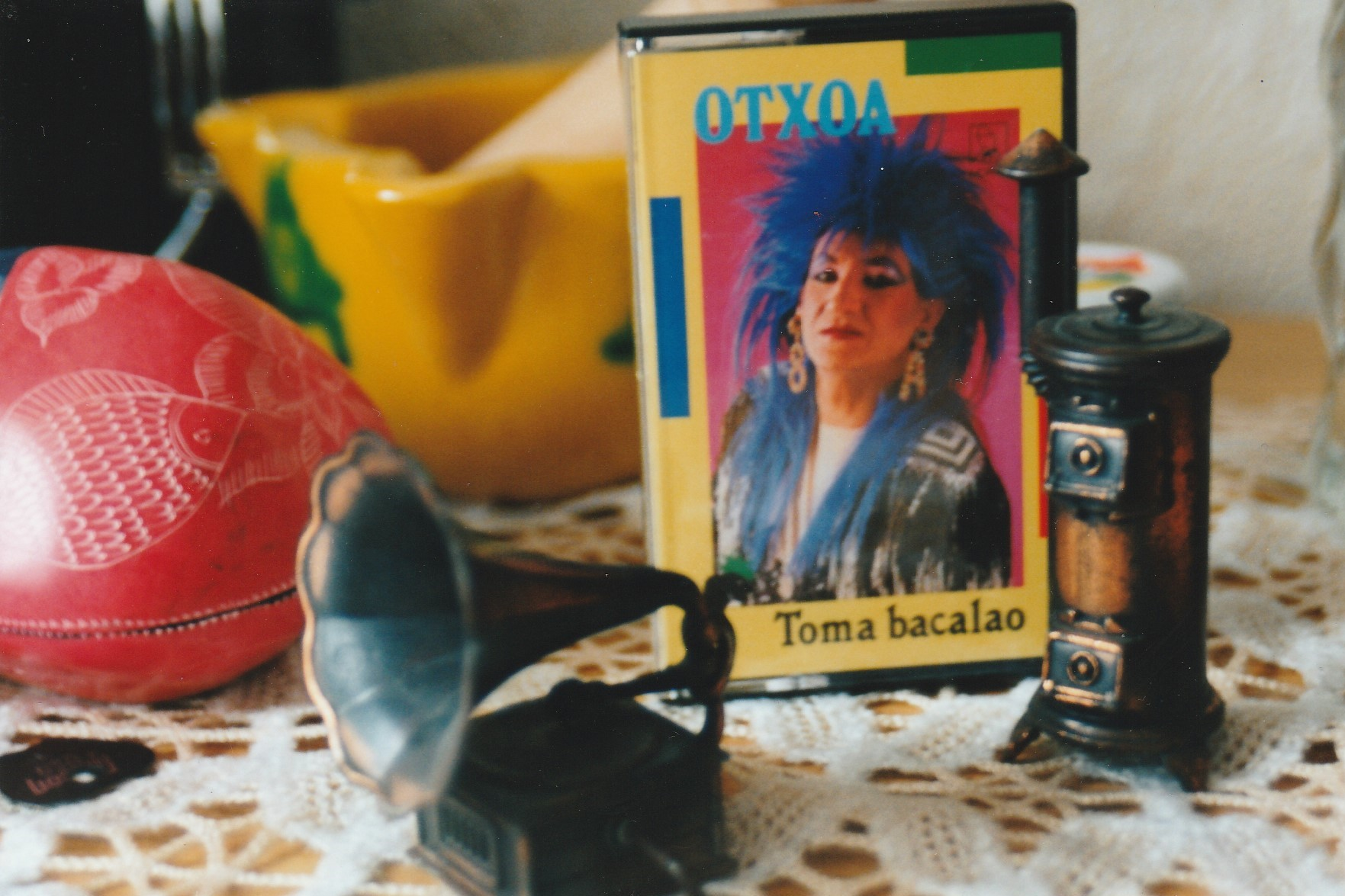
Toma bacalao (1989) by La Otxoa.

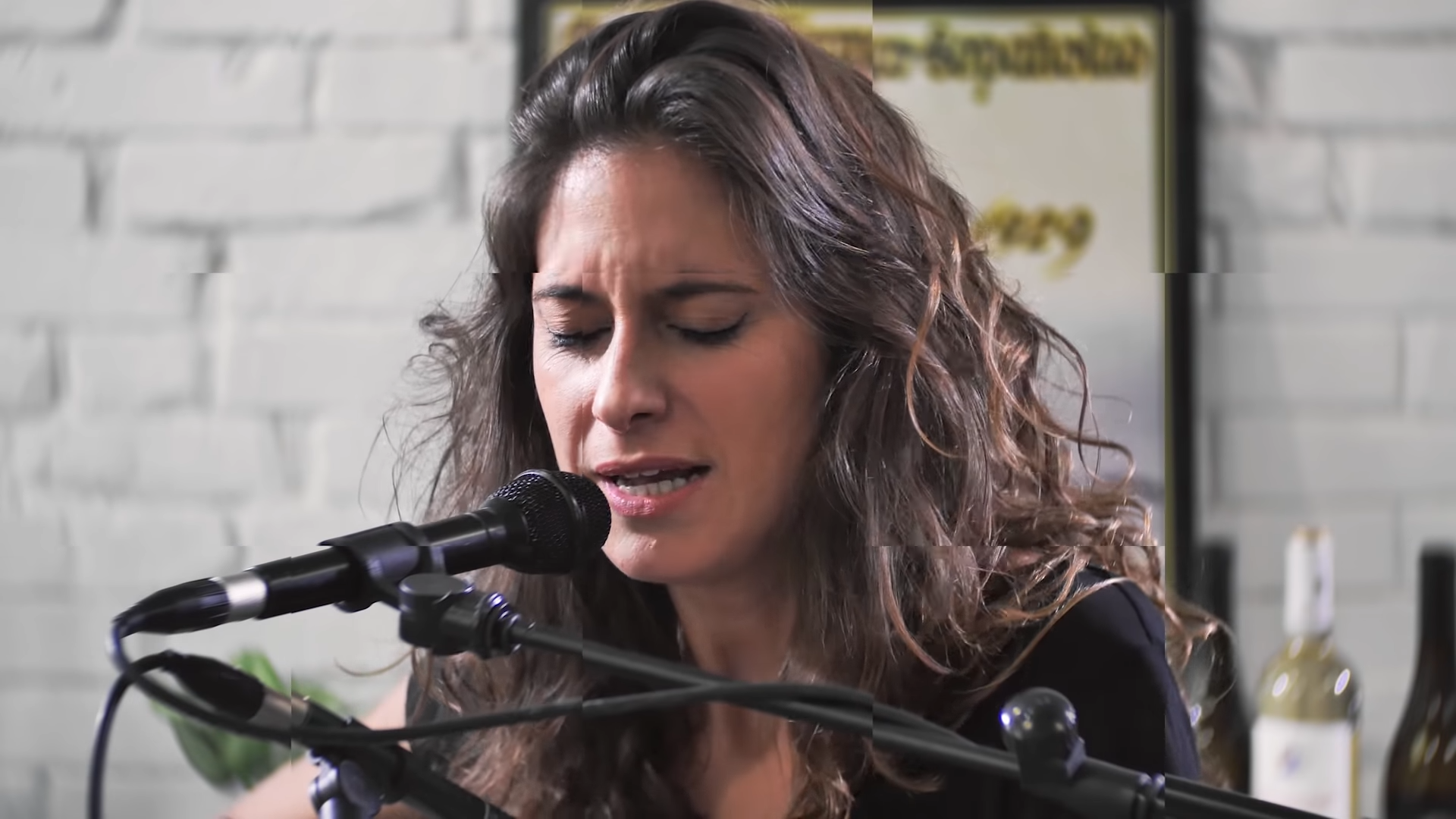
María Peláe.

During Franco's dictatorship, musicians seldom made any reference to homosexuality in their songs or in public speeches. An exception was the copla singer Miguel de Molina, openly homosexual and against Franco. De Molina fled to Argentina after being brutally tortured and his shows prohibited. Another exception was Bambino, whose homosexuality was known in flamenco circles. Some songs from Raphael, as "Qué sabe nadie" ("What does anyone know") or "Digan lo que digan" ("Whatever they say"), have frequently been interpreted in a gay light.

In 1974, the folk rock band Cánovas, Rodrigo, Adolfo y Guzmán talked about a lesbian relationship in the song "María y Amaranta" ("María and Amaranta"), that surprisingly was not censored. During the transition to democracy, the duo Vainica Doble sung about the fight of a gay man against the prejudices of his own family in the song "El rey de la casa" ("The king of the house").

Singer-songwriter Víctor Manuel has included LGBT subjects in several of his songs. In 1980, he released "Quién puso más" ("Who put more?"), a true love story between two men that ends after 30 years. He later mentioned transsexuality in his song "Como los monos de Gibraltar" ("As the monkeys in Gibraltar"), feminine homosexuality in "Laura ya no vive aquí" ("Laura doesn't live here any more") and bisexuality in "No me llames loca" (Don't call me fool/queen).

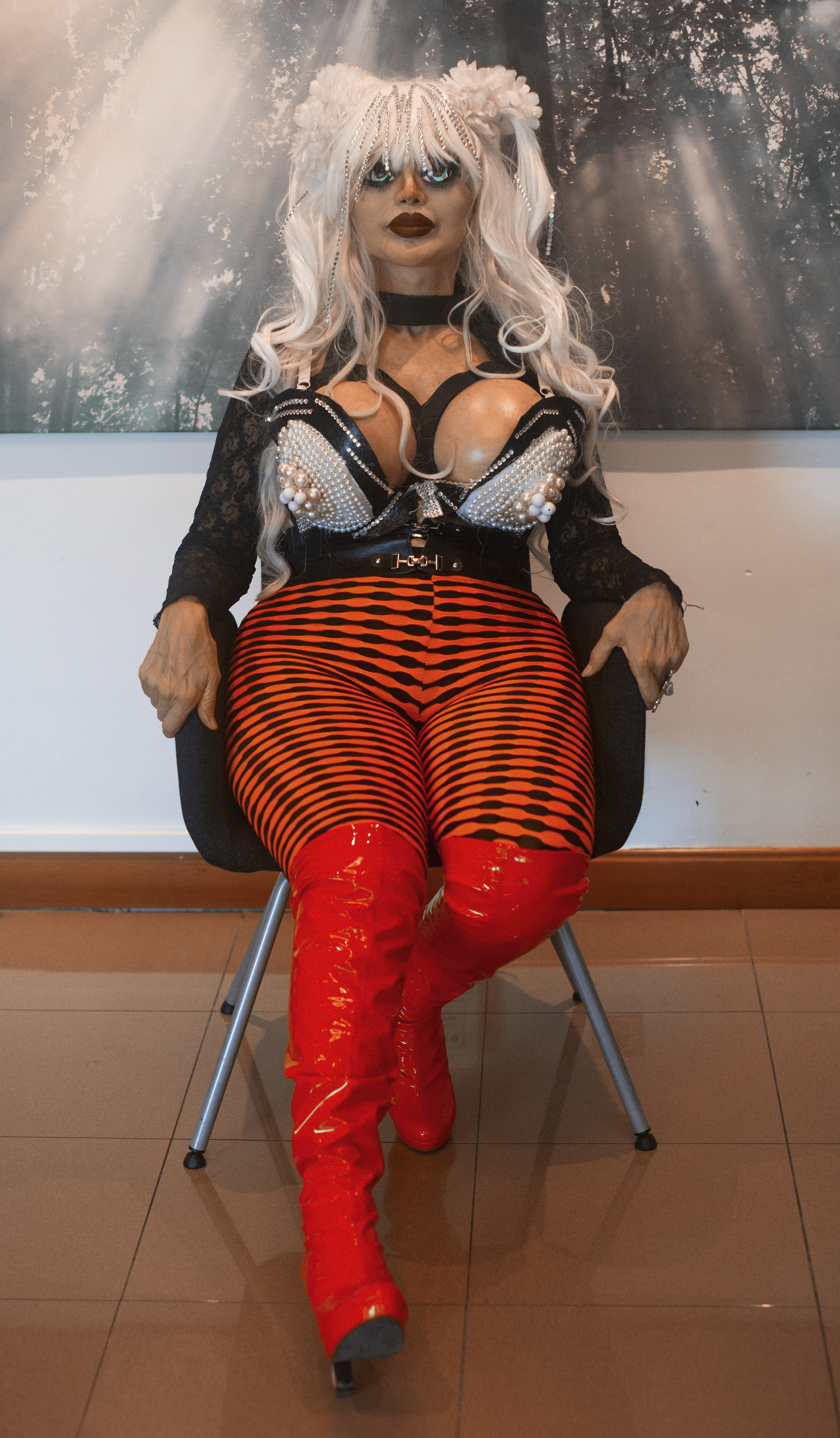
Manuela Trasobares, operatic mezzo-soprano.

It was not until the La Movida Madrileña that homosexuality became visible in Spanish music. The duo Pedro Almodóvar and Fabio McNamara usually dressed as women during their concerts, where they sang provocative lyrics. Tino Casal never hid his homosexuality and became an icon for many gay people. Nevertheless, it would be the trio Alaska, Nacho Canut y Carlos Berlanga who would be identified from the beginning with the LGBT movement due to their constant references to homosexuality in their lyrics and their concerts. During their time as Dinarama, they recorded the song "¿A Quién le Importa?" ("Who cares?"), which became a gay anthem in Spain. After the Movida, several artists continued to make music with homosexual themes, such as Fabio McNamara, Carlos Berlanga in "Vacaciones" ("Holiday"), or Luis Miguélez, ex-guitarist of Dinarama and later member of Glamour to Kill.

At the end of the 1980s, Mecano made a hit with the song "Mujer contra mujer" ("Woman against woman"), clearly defending the love of two women. There were French ("Une femme avec une femme") and Italian ("Per Lei Contro Di Lei") versions. The song was a huge hit in France in 1990 where it reached No. 1 in charts during seven weeks. The song was also a hit in Latin America and is one of the most remembered of the group. They later composed the song "Stereosexual" that talked about bisexuality. In 1988, Tam Tam Go!, in the album "Spanish shuffle", included the song "Manuel Raquel", the only song in Spanish in the album, which told the story of a transsexual. Tino Casal included in his 1989 album Histeria the very explicit song "Que digan misa".

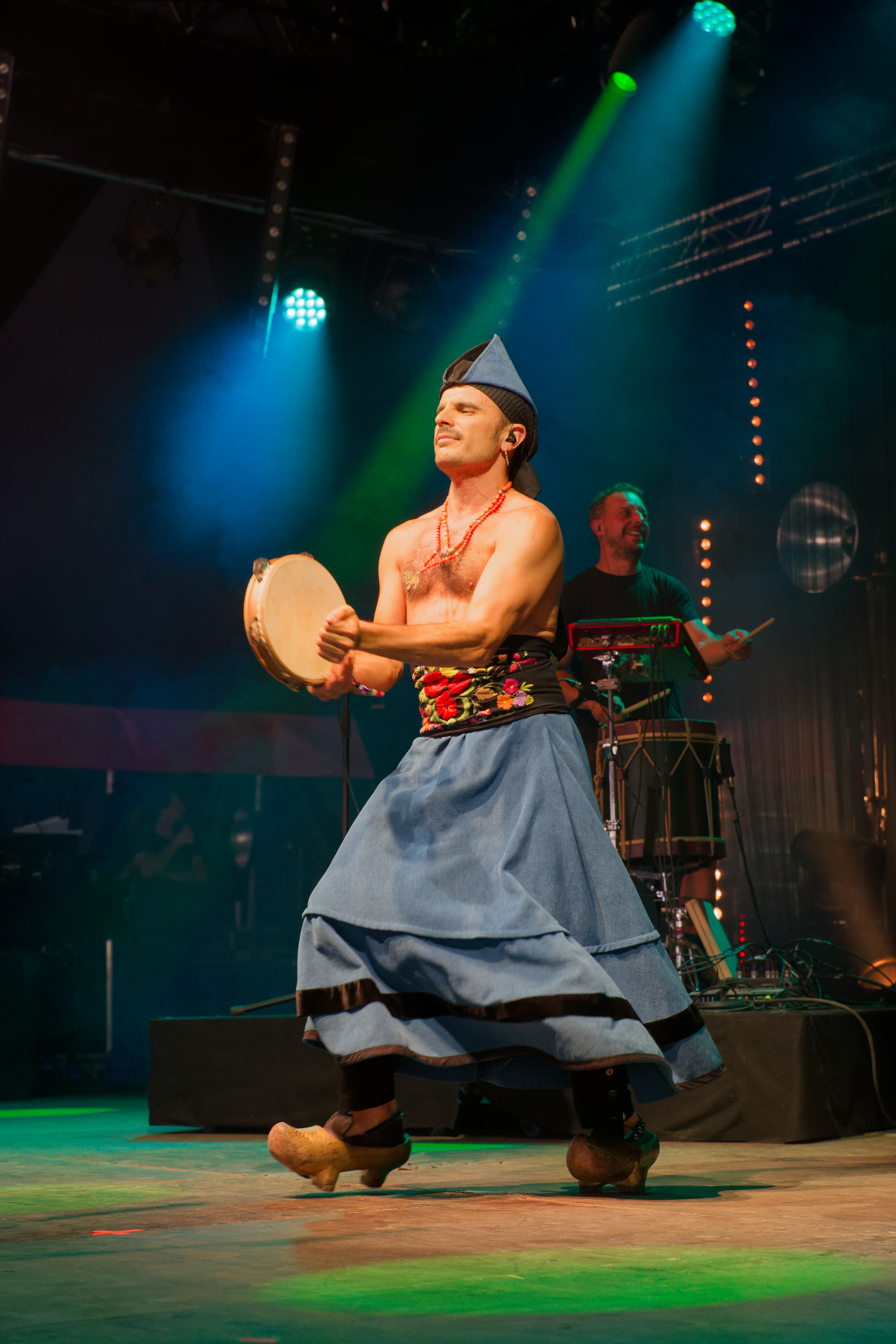
Rodrigo Cuevas (musician)

At the beginning of the 1990s, new singer-songwriters also took up the subject, especially Inma Serrano, Javier Álvarez, and Andrés Lewin, but also Pedro Guerra in his song "Otra forma de sentir" ("Another way of feeling") or Tontxu in "¿Entiendes?" ("Do you understand?"). Other artists with diverse styles also used the theme, as "El cielo no entiende" ("Heaven doesn't understand") by OBK, "Entender el amor" ("Understand love") by Mónica Naranjo, "El día de año nuevo" ("New Year's Day") by Amaral, "Eva y María" by Materia Prima, "Sacrifícate" by Amistades Peligrosas, "La revolución sexual" by La casa azul, "Ángeles" by Merche, "Como una flor" by Malú, "Da igual" by Taxi, "El que quiera entender que entienda" by Mägo de Oz, etc.

Indie pop has also treated homosexuality from different points of view, as the band Ellos in the song "Diferentes" ("Different"), or L Kan in "Gayhetera" (Gayhetero). The duo Astrud has been related to gay culture. The leather subculture has the band Gore Gore Gays with themes that range from LGBT demands to explicit sex. Within the indie pop universe, many other bands produce songs almost exclusively for a gay public, especially gay-friendly or with a clear gay content (Nancys Rubias, Lorena C, Spunky, La Terremoto de Alcorcón, Putilatex, Putirecords, Borrachas provincianas, Vanity Bear, Modelé Fatale, Dos Hombres Solos, Postura 69, etc.) and some drag queens have a successful career in music, such as La Prohibida, Nacha la Macha, or La Otxoa.

=== Painting and performing arts ===
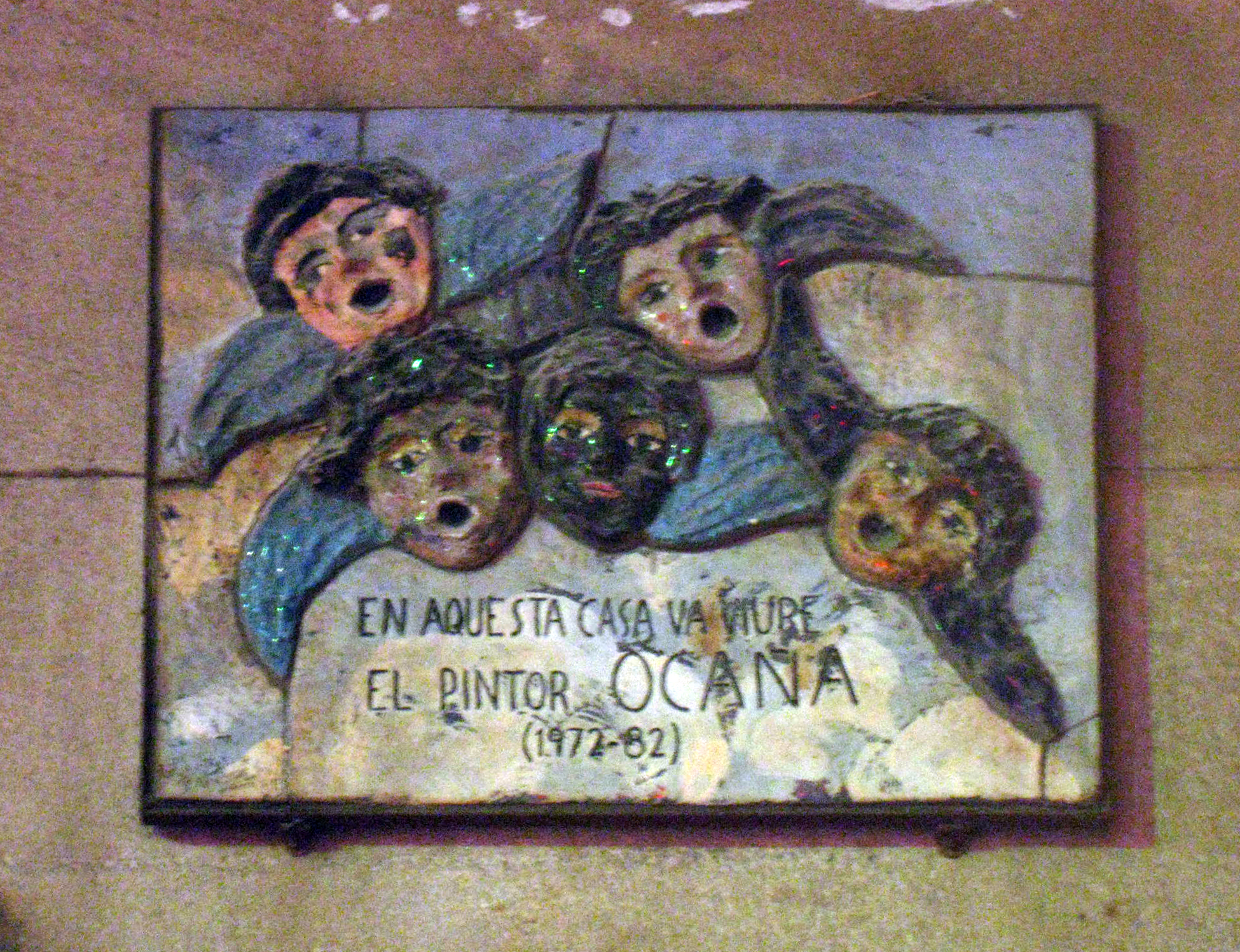
Plaque on the house of the Royal Square in Barcelona, where La Ocaña lived.

La Ocaña was a central figure in Barcelona's counter-culture movement during the Spanish transition to democracy, at a time of particular vitality. His performances and artistic endeavours, much like his own life, have been considered pioneers of sexual and gender disobedience practices in Spain, in the fields of both queer activism and art history. He also stood out as an icon of opposition to Francoism and its social conventions in the final years of the regime, from an anarchist perspective.

=== Politics ===
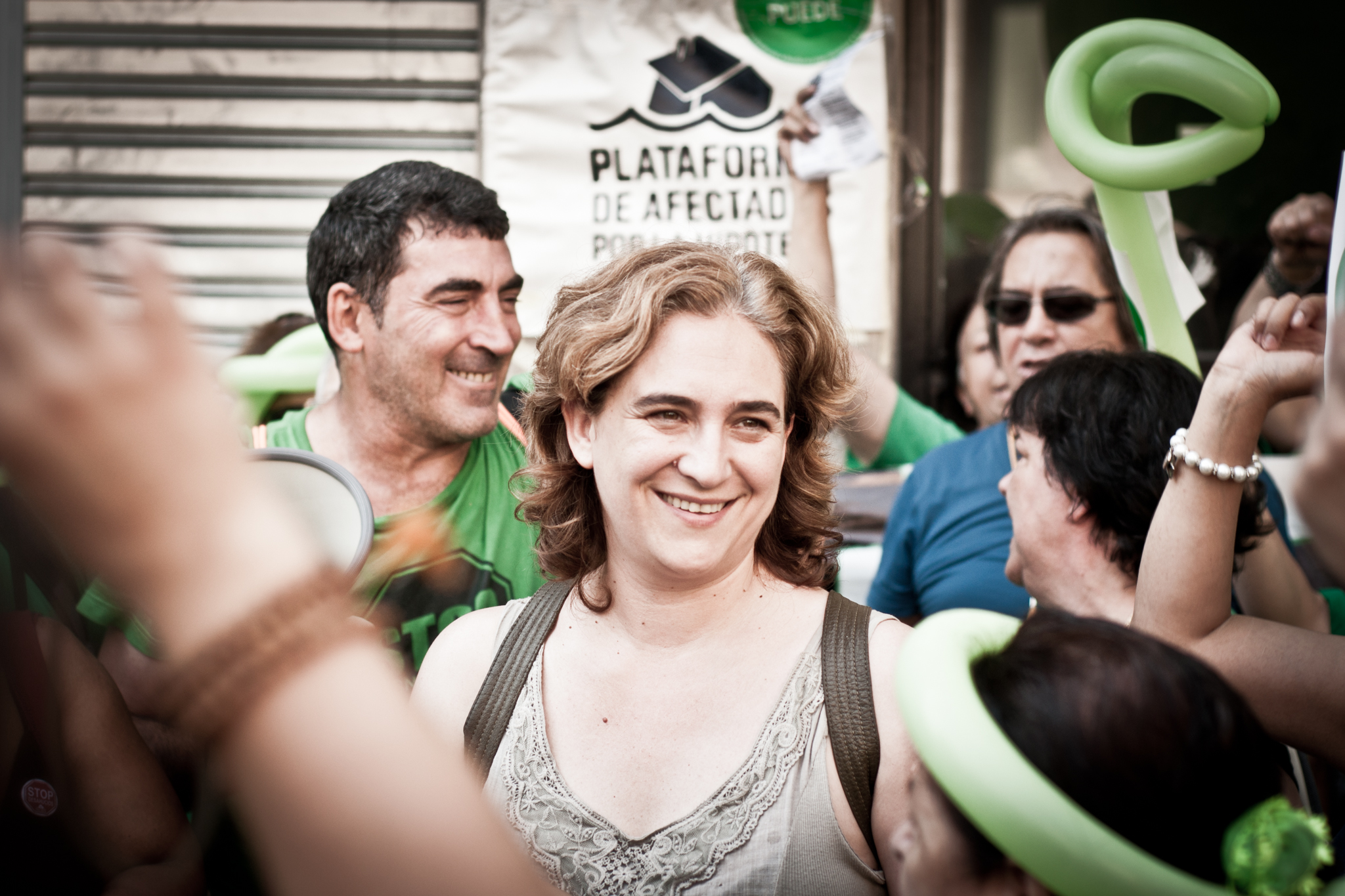
Ada Colau, the openly bisexual Mayor of Barcelona

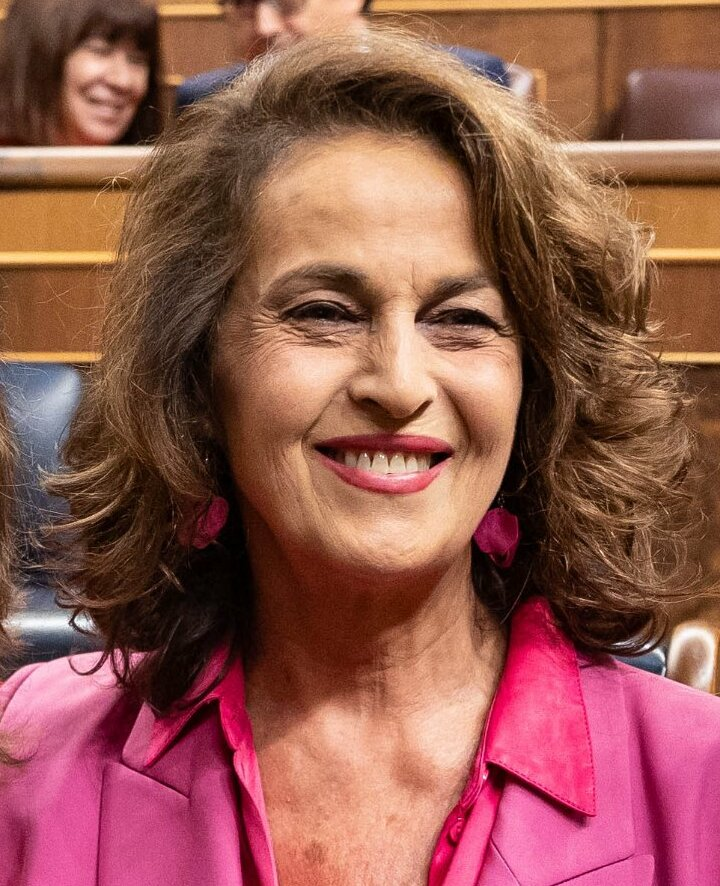
Carla Antonelli first trans person to be elected to the Spanish Parliament.

Several openly gay politicians have served in public office in Spain. Jerónimo Saavedra, who served as President of the Canary Islands twice from 1982 to 1987 and again from 1991 to 1993, came out as gay in 2000. He served as a member of the Senate until 2004, and was Mayor of Las Palmas from 2007 to 2011. Another prominent gay politician and activist was Pedro Zerolo, who served on the City Council of Madrid until his death in June 2015. Zerolo was known for his LGBT activism and was one of the biggest promoters of the law extending the right to marriage to same-sex couples.

Others include Javier Maroto, formerly serving as mayor of the Basque capital of Vitoria-Gasteiz from 2011 to 2015 and currently serving as senator. Maroto married his fiancé José Manuel Rodríguez in September 2015. The marriage ceremony was attended by Prime Minister Mariano Rajoy. Máximo Huerta, Ángeles Álvarez and Fernando Grande-Marlaska are other gay politicians who serve/have served in the Cortes Generales. Grande-Marlaska has served as Minister of the Interior since June 2018.

Ada Colau, elected Mayor of Barcelona in 2015, spoke publicly about her bisexuality in December 2017. Other Catalan gay politicians include Antoni Comín, Santi Vila and Miquel Iceta.

Carla Antonelli, Víctor Casco, Iñigo Lamarca, Fran Ferri, Jesús Vázquez Abad, Iñaki Oyarzábal, Empar Pineda and Luis Alegre Zahonero are other openly LGBT politicians, variously serving as mayors or members of regional legislatures. In 2007, Manuela Trasobares won a seat as a councillor in the small Valencian town of Geldo, becoming the first openly transgender Spaniard to hold public office.

=== Sports ===
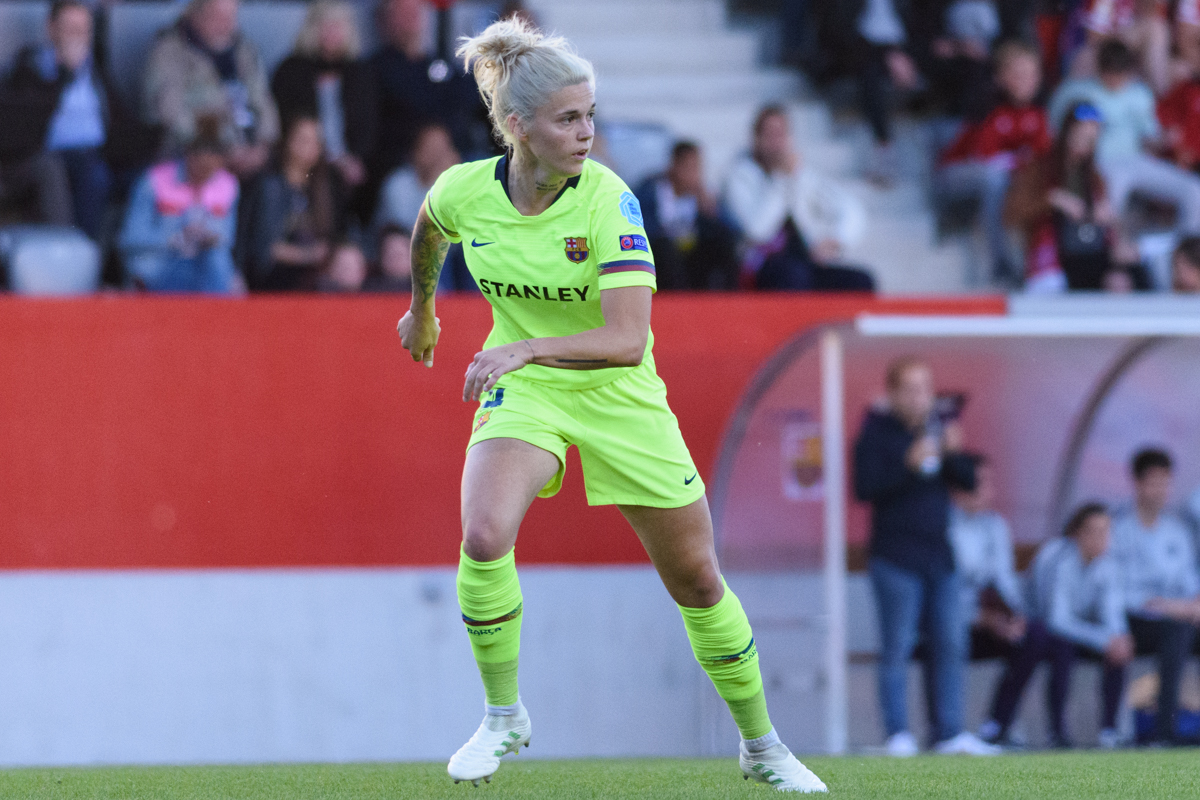
Mapi León, lesbian footballer and player in the Spain women's national football team

Sports is traditionally a difficult area for LGBT visibility. Recently though, there have been professional sportswomen and sportsmen who have come out. These include Mapi León and Ana Romero in football, Víctor Gutiérrez in waterpolo, Carlos Peralta in swimming, Marta Mangué in handball, Javier Raya in figure skating and Miriam Blasco in judo.

In February 2019, the far-right party Vox vetoed a motion calling for an official stance against homophobia in sports. The motion, supported by every other political party, required unanimity to be adopted.

== Summary table ==
Right	Status
Same-sex sexual activity legal	Yes (Since 1979)
Equal age of consent (16)	Yes (Since 1995)
Anti-discrimination laws in employment	Yes (Since 1995)
Anti-discrimination laws in the provision of goods and services	Yes (Since 2022)
Anti-discrimination laws in all other areas (incl. indirect discrimination, hate speech)	Yes (Since 1995)
Anti-discrimination laws concerning gender identity	Yes (Since 2022)
Same-sex marriage	Yes (Since 2005)
Recognition of same-sex couples (e.g. unregistered cohabitation, life partnership)	Yes (Since 1998 in some autonomous communities, since 2018 nationwide)
Stepchild adoption by same-sex couples	Yes (Since 2000 in some autonomous communities, since 2005 nationwide)
Joint adoption by same-sex couples	Yes (Since 2000 in some autonomous communities, since 2005 nationwide)
Automatic parentage presumption on birth certificates for children of same-sex couples	Yes (Since 2015)
LGBT people allowed to serve openly in the military	Yes
Right to change legal gender on documents or forms by way of self-determination and without SRS or sterilization	Yes (Since 2023, for those over 16-years-old)
Automatic parental leave for both spouses after birth	Yes (Since 2006)
Access to IVF treatment for everyone	Yes (Since 2021 nationwide by executive order, since 2023 by law)
Conversion therapy banned by law nationwide	Yes (Since 2023)
Intersex minors protected from invasive surgical procedures by law nationwide	Yes (Since 2023)
Legal recognition of non-binary gender	Yes / No Some cases have made their way to a jury and the case won, so now some people have an X instead of an F (femenino) or an M (masculino) as their sex in their personal ID (Spanish DNI)
MSMs allowed to donate blood	Yes (Since 2005)

== See also ==
- COGAM
- Human rights in Spain
- Same-sex marriage in Spain
- First same-sex marriage in Spain
- LGBT history in Spain
- LGBT rights in Europe
- LGBT rights in the European Union
