= Human rights in Spain =

Human rights in Spain are set out in the 1978 Spanish constitution. Sections 6 and 7 guarantees the right to create and operate political parties and trade unions so long as they respect the Constitution and the law.

== Healthcare for illegal immigrants ==
Until 2012, universal healthcare was guaranteed to all universal immigrants regardless of the administrative status. There was an attempt to change this situation under a new health law introduced in September 2012, whereby immigrants or expatriates without proper residents permits were to be refused medical care. Illegal immigrants would only be entitled to free treatment within Spain's healthcare system in cases of emergency or a pregnancy or birth. This law was rejected and not applied by a majority of regions of Spain, which have ensured universal coverage to illegal immigrants.

== Roma ==
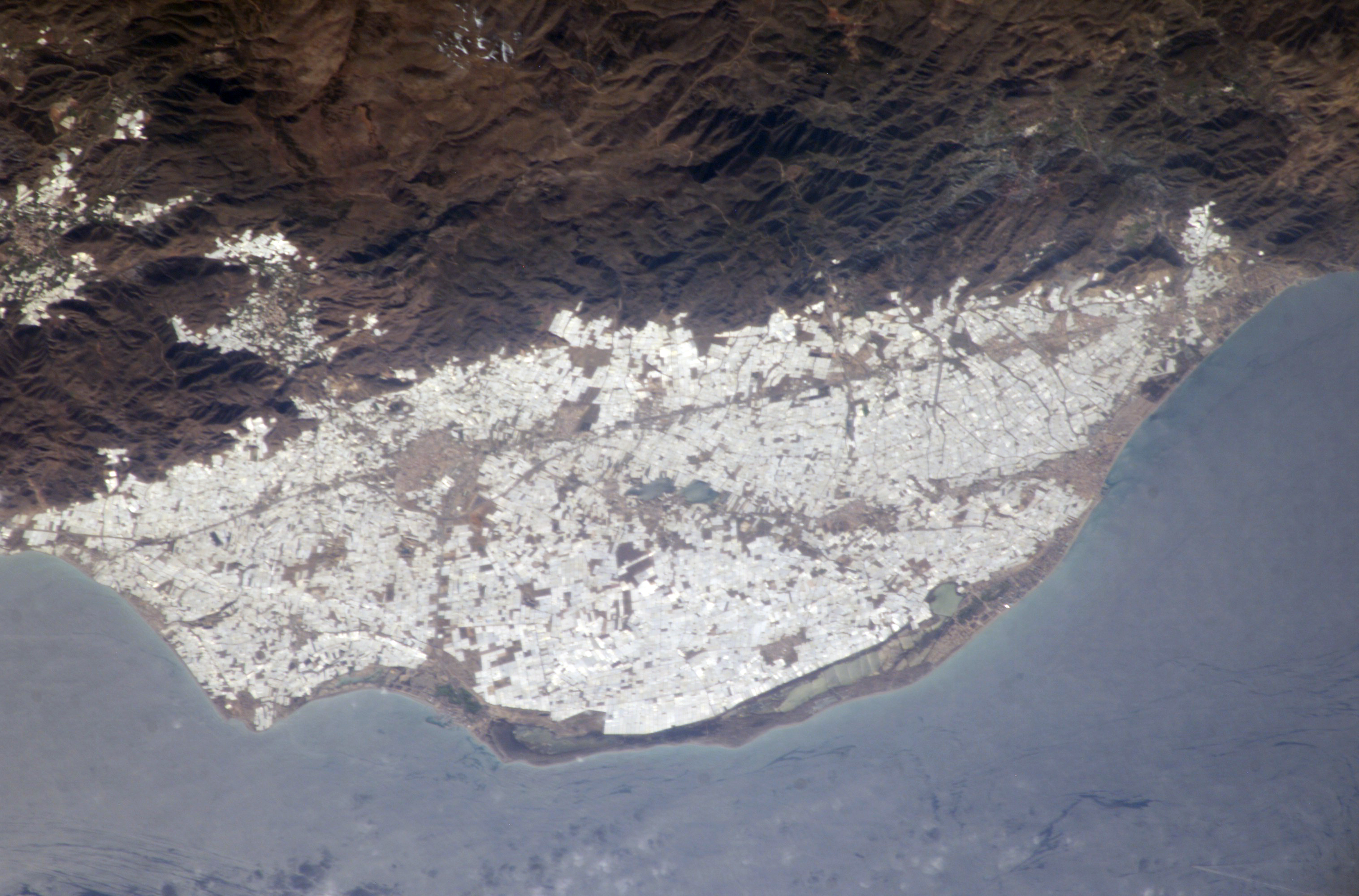
NASA view of greenhouses at El Ejido on the Campo de Dalías, Spain.

Environmental racism has been documented in Spain, with North African and Romani ethnic communities being particularly affected, as well as migrant agricultural workers from throughout Africa, Asia, Latin America, and Southeast Europe. As of 2007, there were an estimated 750,000 Romani (primarily Gitano Romani) living in Spain. According to the "Housing Map of the Roma Community in Spain, 2007", 12% of Romani live in substandard housing, while 4%, or 30,000 people, live in slums or shantytowns; furthermore, 12% resided in segregated settlements. According to the Roma Inclusion Index 2015, the denial of environmental benefits has been documented in some communities, with 4% of Romani in Spain not having access to running water, and 9% not having access to electricity.

Efforts to relocate shantytowns (chabolas), which according to a 2009 report by the EU Agency for Fundamental Rights were disproportionately inhabited by Romani persons, gained momentum in the late 1980s and 1990s. These initiatives were ostensibly designed to improve Romani living conditions, yet also had the purpose of being employed to vacate plots of real estate for development. In the words of a 2002 report on the situation of Romani in Spain, "thousands of Roma live in transitional housing, without any indication of when the transition period will end," a situation which has been attributed to the degradation of many transitional housing projects into ghettoes. In the case of many such relocations, Romani people have been moved to the peripheries of urban centers, often in environmentally problematic areas. In the case of Cañada Real Galiana, diverse ethnic groups including non-Romani Spaniards and Moroccans have been documented as experiencing issues of environmental injustice alongside Romani communities.

In 2002, 16 Romani families in El Cascayu were relocated under a transitional housing scheme to what has been described by the organization SOS Racismo as a discriminatory, isolated, and environmentally marginalized housing location. According to SOS Racismo,

... the last housing units built within [the] eradication of marginalization plan in El Cascayu, where 16 families will be re-housed, is a way of chasing these families out of the city. They will live in a place surrounded by a 'sewer river,' a railroad trail, an industrial park and a highway. So far away from education centres, shops, recreational places and without public transport, it will be physically difficult for them to get out of there.

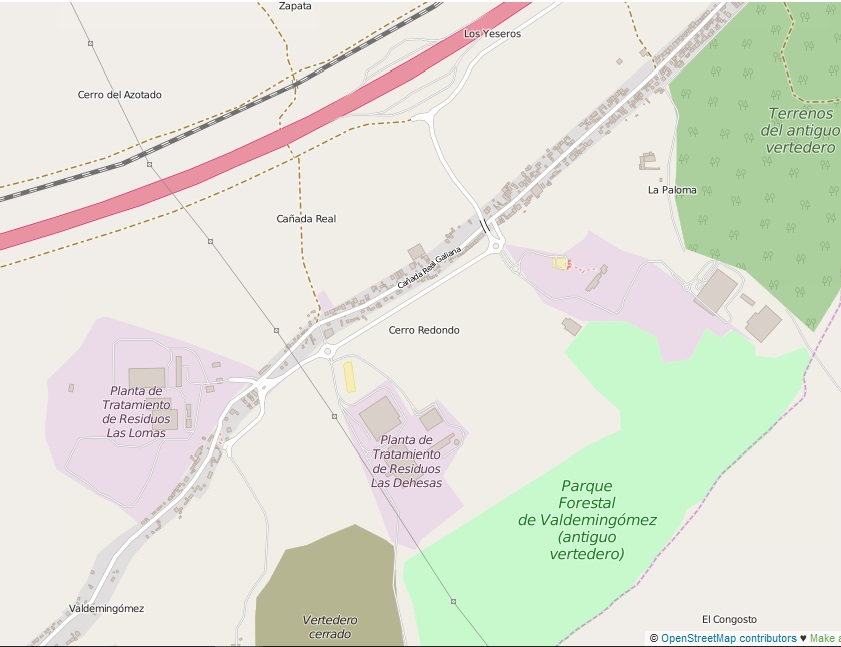
Map excerpt of Valdemingómez district, Cañada Real Galiana, Madrid. The long grey strip along Cañada Real Galiana roadway and transhumance trail denotes the 16 kilometre-long, 75 metre-wide shantytown where 8,600 persons reside. Rectangular shapes denote structures.

On the outskirts of Madrid, 8,600 persons inhabit the informal settlement of Cañada Real Galiana, also known as La Cañada Real Riojana or La Cañada Real de las merinas. It constitutes the largest shantytown in Western Europe. The settlement is located along 16 kilometres of a 75-metre-wide, 400 kilometre-long environmentally protected transhumance trail between Getafe and Coslada, part of a 125,000 kilometre network of transhumance routes throughout Spain. Certain areas of the unplanned and unauthorized settlement are economically affluent, working-class, or middle-class and are viewed as desirable areas for many (particularly Moroccan immigrants who have faced discrimination in the broader Spanish rental market). However, much of the Cañada Real Galiana is subject to severe environmental racism, particularly in the Valdemingómez district of the settlement.

=== Migrant agricultural workers in Southern Spain ===
Throughout southern Spain, migrant workers from Africa, Asia, Latin America, and South East Europe employed in the agricultural sector have experienced housing and labour conditions that could be defined as environmental racism, producing food for larger European society while facing extreme deprivations.

In Murcia, lettuce pickers have complained of having to illegally work for salary by volume for employment agencies, instead of by the hour, meaning they are required to work more hours for less pay, while also experiencing unsafe exposure to pesticides. Workers have alleged that they have been forced to work in fields while pesticide spraying is active, a practice which is illegal under Spanish work safety laws.

Beginning in the 2000s in the El Ejido region of Andalusia, African (including large numbers of Moroccan) immigrant greenhouse workers have been documented as being faced with severe social marginalization and racism while simultaneously being exposed to extremely difficult working conditions with significant exposure to toxic pesticides. The El Ejido region has been described by environmentalists as a "sea of plastic" due to the expansive swaths of land covered by greenhouses, and has also been labeled "Europe's dirty little secret" due to the documented abuses of workers who help produce large quantities of Europe's food supply.

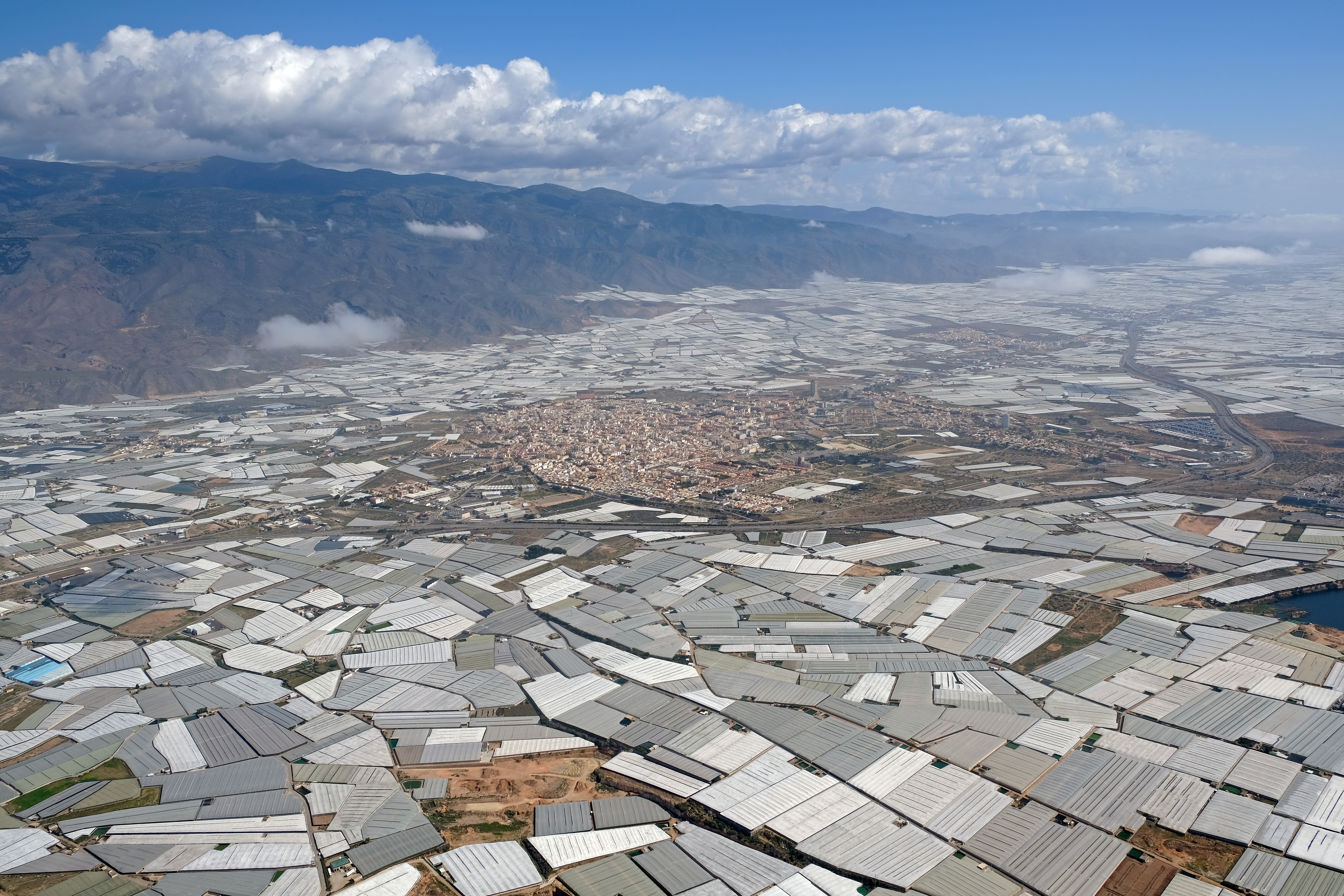
Greenhouses at El Ejido

In these greenhouses, workers are allegedly required to work under "slave-like" conditions in temperatures as high as 50 degrees Celsius with nonexistent ventilation, while being denied basic rest facilities and earning extremely low wages, among other workplace abuses. As of 2015, out of 120,000 immigrant workers employed in the greenhouses, 80,000 are undocumented and not protected by Spanish labour legislation, according to Spitou Mendy of the Spanish Field Workers Syndicate (SOC). Workers have complained of ill health effects as a result of exposure to pesticides without proper protective equipment.

Following the killing of two Spanish farmers and a Spanish woman in two separate incidents involving Moroccan citizens in February 2000, an outbreak of xenophobic violence took place in and around El Ejido, injuring 40 and displacing large numbers of immigrants. According to Angel Lluch

For three days on end, from 5 to 7 February, racist violence swept the town with immigrants as its target. For 72 hours hordes of farmers wielding iron bars, joined by youths from the high schools, beat up their victims, chased them through the streets and pursued them out among the greenhouses. Roads were blocked, barricaded and set aflame.

In the strawberry industry in the province of Huelva, around 2018–2019, some incidents of rape, forced prostitution of migrant workers and poor housing conditions and sanitation have been claimed.

== Legal reform ==
In February 2014, a Spanish court ordered the arrest of China's former Party General Secretary Jiang Zemin and former Premier Li Peng for the alleged genocide and torture of the people of Tibet. The Chinese government expressed anger at the actions of the Spanish court, with foreign ministry spokeswoman Hua Chunying stating "China is strongly dissatisfied and firmly opposed to the erroneous acts taken by the Spanish agencies in disregard of China's position." In May 2014, in response to the diplomatic situation, the Spanish government repealed the universal jurisdiction law.

Former judge Baltasar Garzón has criticized the government's reform. Commenting on the judges ability to prosecute foreign crimes against humanity, genocides, and war crimes; he said, "The conditions that they're imposing are so exorbitant that it would be almost impossible to prosecute these crimes.

== See also ==
- Francoist concentration camps
- Internet censorship in Spain
- LGBT rights in Spain
- Environmental racism in Europe
