= Bolo-Bolo =

Spanish LGBT rights association

Bolo-Bolo is a Spanish non-profit organization based in Toledo focused on the rights of the LGBTQ people. It was established on 9 February 2001, and it focuses on promoting equality, diversity and non-discrimination on the grounds of sexual orientation in the Castilla-La Mancha region. They organize the Toledo Entiende ("Toledo Understands") Cultural Week, one of the major pride celebrations in the region.

== History ==
Bolo-Bolo was formed in the early 2000s in Toledo by local activists who sought to make a difference for the LGBTQ people in the Castilla-La Mancha region, which did not have much of similar entities focusing on the welfare of these groups. The association works on creating awareness and organizing talks, debates and cultural activities on the subject in different cities in the region.

== Activities ==
Bolo-Bolo has collaborated with various public institutions and other social groups to conduct campaigns and youth programs. It actively participates in commemorative events such as LGBTQ pride week, Day against homophobia, bisexual visibility day, and trans visibility day. On the World AIDS Day, it organized an information campaign at the Plaza de Zocodover in Toledo.

The organization works with the municipality of Toledo and the regional government, to incorporated LGBTQ perspectives in the government policies. It worked with the government to enable the formation of the LGBTQ Council of Castilla-La Mancha to coordinate public policies on diversity in 2024. It helps with conducting educational and training activities for youth, teaching staff and families of LGBTQ people. It conducts awareness programs on sexual diversity and discrimination on the basis of sexual orientation or gender identity.

On 6 June 2021, the organization called a rally in response to the murder of Samuel Luiz, attended by the mayor of Toledo and other members of the municipal government.

=== Toledo Entiende ===
One of the main projects of the association is the Toledo Entiende ("Toledo Understands") Cultural Week, which has been held annually since the mid-2000s. The event combines cultural and advocacy activities, including conferences, screenings, exhibitions, workshops and performances, with the aim of promoting LGBTQ diversity and visibility. The reading of a common manifesto for LGBTQ rights in the Plaza de Zocodover and pride march of in the historic center of Toledo city are part of the week.
