= Decriminalization of homosexuality in Spain =

The decriminalization of homosexuality in Spain refers to the 1978 amendment of the Ley sobre Peligrosidad y Rehabilitación Social (Law on Social Dangerousness and Social Rehabilitation), which removed homosexuality as a punishable offence. The amendment was passed on 26 December 1978 by the government of Adolfo Suárez and entered into force on 31 January 1979.

== Background ==
During the Franco dictatorship, homosexuality was classified as a criminal offence. The Ley de Vagos y Maleantes ("Vagrancy Act") of 1933 was amended in 1954 to explicitly include homosexuals among those subject to persecution and imprisonment.

This law was replaced in 1970 by the Ley de Peligrosidad y Rehabilitación Social, which maintained the criminalisation of homosexuality and established punishments ranging from fines to up to five years of internment in prisons or psychiatric institutions for the "rehabilitation" of individuals. Homosexual men were specifically divided between two prisons: Huelva (for "actives") and Badajoz (for "passives").

== Reform of 1978 ==
From 1977 onwards, the homosexual liberation movement organised demonstrations and campaigns calling for legal reform. The Communist Party of Spain, newly elected to the Congress of Deputies in 1977, proposed an amendment to the Law of Social Danger to repeal its clause criminalising homosexual acts.

The reform was passed almost unanimously on 26 December 1978 (278 votes in favour, 6 abstentions out of 284 cast) by the government of Adolfo Suárez, and published in the Boletín Oficial del Estado on 11 January 1979, entering into force on 31 January 1979.

Notably, gay and transgender prisoners were not considered political prisoners and were therefore excluded from the Amnesty Law of 1977. Their release came only in 1979, after the reform took effect.

== Continued criminalisation after 1978 ==
Despite the 1978 amendment, LGBT people continued to face prosecution under the ley de escándalo público ("public scandal law"), which was not amended until 1983 and fully repealed in 1989. The Ley de Peligrosidad y Rehabilitación Social was not definitively abolished until 23 November 1995, when the law was fully repealed.

== Subsequent developments ==
The decriminalisation of 1978 was the first step in the recognition of LGBT rights in Spain. In 1995, the Penal Code was reformed to classify discrimination based on sexual orientation as a criminal offence. In 2005, Spain became one of the first countries in the world to legalise [[same-sex marriage in Spain|same-sex marriage]].
