= Francesc Miralles =

Catalan writer, essayist, translator and musician

Francesc Miralles Contijoch (born 27 August 1968) is a Spanish writer, essayist, translator, and musician.

== Personal life ==
Miralles, son of a dressmaker and an erudite office clerk, was born on 27 August 1968 in Barcelona, Spain. Having studied for eight years at a Catholic school in La Ribera, next to the Palau de la Música, he decided to continue his education by attending secondary school at the now defunct Almi Academy and at Montserrat High School.

Despite his bad high-school records he was admitted to the faculty of Journalism at the Autonomous University of Barcelona (UAB), but dropped out after four months. That year he worked as a waiter in Les Puces del Barri Gótic, a bar located on Montsió Street, where he learnt to play the piano.

The following year he returned to university, to study for a degree in English, and he worked as a language teacher in a primary school at the same time. After 5 years of apathy, at a standstill in the third year of his university course, he once again abandoned his studies.

Having been bitten by the travel bug since the age of 17, he decided to leave it all and travel the world. He lived in Croatia and Slovenia during the Balkan Wars, an experience that, years later, would be the basis for his book Cafè Balcànic (Balkan Café). He travelled to India and was inspired by the cultures and traditions in India. He is influenced by Indian thinker Jiddu Krishnamurthi and Ramana Maharshi.

When he returned to Barcelona, he went back to university once again, this time studying for a degree in German at the University of Barcelona. After finishing his degree, he did a post-graduate course in editorial studies. His entry into the editorial world had started the previous year, as a translator of books about spirituality and alternative therapies, from German to English.

After finishing his degree, he was hired as an editor by a publishing house specialised in self-help books. There he was in charge of different collections and wrote all kind of works under a pseudonym. His thirteen months working for the publishing house were so full of incidents that they might, in some ways, be considered equivalent to the military service he hadn't done; in his first novel written in Spanish, Barcelona Blues, he recounts this experience.

== Literary work ==
After leaving the publisher, he promised himself never to work for a company again. He decided to try his luck with the young adult novel Un haiku per l'Alícia (A Haiku for Alice), for which he was awarded the 2001/02 Gran Angular prize. Since then he has been making a living mainly as a writer, but also as a literary consultant for several publishers and an agency.

Other young-adult literature he has published are El Quinto Mago (The Fifth Wizard), with a backdrop of fine magic, Alison Blix, El Cuaderno de Aroha (Aroha's Notebook), as well as Retrum, a young-adult novel that has been translated into eight languages and which is linked to his later trilogy called Øbliviøn by the presence of the Gothic-inspired urban tribe known as Los Pálidos (The Pale Beings).

In autumn 2009, he and his co-author and friend Alex Rovira received the Torrevieja Prize for the novel La última respuesta (The Last Answer), and the two have also jointly published El Laberinto de la Felicidad (The Labyrinth of Happiness), Un Corazón lleno de Estrellas (A Heart Full of Stars) and El Bosque de la Sabiduría (The Forest of Wisdom), which have been translated into more than twelve languages.

The novel El mejor lugar del mundo es aquí mismo (The Best Place in the World is Right Here) (2008), co-authored by Care Santos, has been translated into a similar number of languages.

Among the adult novels written by him, a highlight is Ojalá estuvieras aquí (Wish You Were Here) (2009), a melancholic story full of love and mystery. This novel tells of Miralles's experiences in a band called Hotel Guru, and it is redolent of the artistic atmosphere of l'Astorbari, a bar in the Barcelona district of Gràcia where live concerts are performed .

Wabi-Sabi, a story about the beauty of imperfection and the ephemeral, will appear this coming spring; it is the long-awaited sequel to Amor en minúscula (Love in Lower-Case Letters), which has already been translated into twenty languages.

Since 2012, he has been working on the novel La luz de Alejandría (The Light of Alexandria), which he is writing together with Álex Rovira.

== Activity in music and journalism ==
As a musician, he released the album Hotel Guru, in 2007.

After a break with his band Nikosia, which has released four albums, he currently dedicates his time to both literature and journalism, combining monthly contributions to newspapers and magazines like El País Semanal and Mente Sana with his work as a literary pathfinder.

== List of novels ==
In addition to having written a number of self-help books, Miralles is a prolific novelist; his literary works include

- Perdut a Bombai (Lost in Bombay) (2001)
- Un haiku per l'Alícia (A Haiku for Alice) (2002) for which he was awarded the Gran Angular Prize
- El somni d'Occident (The Dream of the West) (2002)
- Café balcànic (Balkan Café) (2004)
- Jet Lag (2006)
- Barcelona Blues (2004)
- Amor en minúscula (Love in Lower-Case Letters) (2006)
- Interrail (2007) for which he was awarded the Columna Jove Prize
- El viaje de Índigo (Indigo's Journey) (2007)
- El cuarto reino (The Fourth Kingdom) (2008)
- La profecía 2013 (The 2013 Prophecy) (2008)
- "Ojalá estuvieras aquí" (Wish You Were Here) (2009)
- Retrum (2009)
- El llegat de Judes (The Legacy of Judas) - written in collaboration with Joan Bruna (2010)
- "Pulsaciones"

== Non-fiction publications ==
His non-fiction works include

- Barcelona romántica (Romantic Barcelona) (2004)
- La Barcelona insólita (Incredible Barcelona) (2005)
- L'autoajuda al descobert (Self-Help Uncovered) (2006)
- Conversaciones sobre la felicidad (Conversations about Happiness) (2007)
- El laberinto de la felicidad (The Labyrinth of Happiness) (2007) - written in collaboration with Álex Rovira and already translated into ten languages.
- Ikigai: The Japanese Secret to a Long and Happy Life (2016) - written in collaboration with Héctor García Puigcerver. Translated into 70 languages.

== Translations by Miralles ==
As a translator, he has translated young-adult fiction by Henning Mankell, such as Viatge a la fi del món (Journey to the End of the World) and El noi que dormia a la neu (The Boy who Slept in the Snow), both of them in 2007, into Catalan.

== Contributions to story collections ==
- Bleak House Inn: Diez huéspedes en casa de Dickens (Bleak House Inn: Ten Guests in Dickens’s House). Stories by Pilar Adón, Elia Barceló, Oscar Esquivias, Marc Gual, César Mallorquí, Ismael Martínez Biurrun, Elena Medel, Francesc Miralles, Daniel Sánchez Pardos and Marian Womack. Edited by Care Santos. Madrid: Fábulas de Albión, 2012
- La audición (The Audition) (a tale about Josef von Sternberg and Marlene Dietrich, in Ellos y ellas: Relaciones de amor, lujuria y odio entre directores y estrellas (Guys and Dolls: Love, Lust and Hate Relationships between Directors and Stars) (co-editors: Hilario J. Rodríguez and Carlos Tejeda). Edited by Hilario J. Rodríguez. Madrid: Calamar Ediciones, 2010
