= José Miguel Vilar-Bou =

Spanish novelist

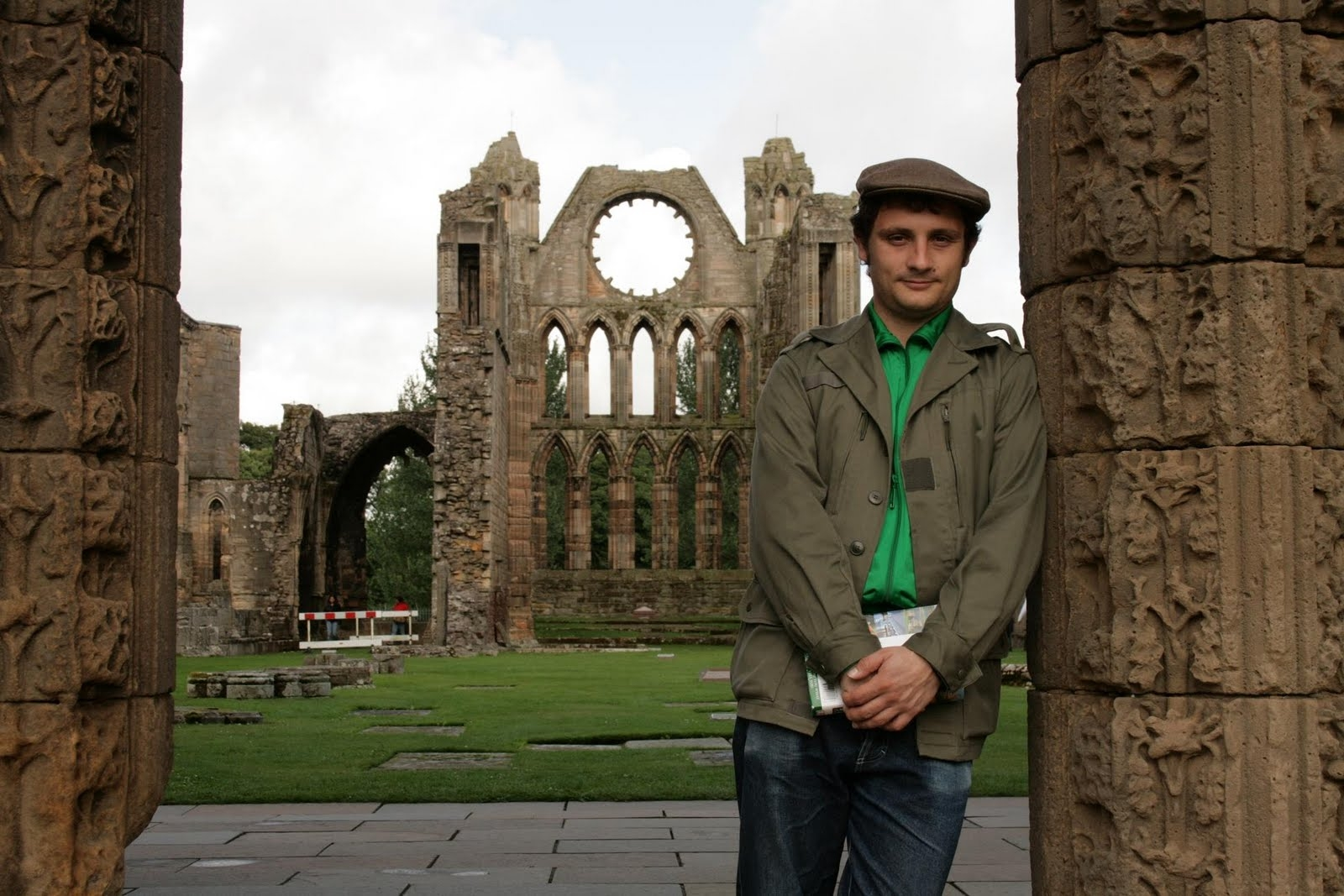
- Vilar-Bou in Scotland, 2010
- Born: April 5, 1979 (age 47); Valencia, Spain
- Occupations: Writer, journalist
- Writing career
- Genres: Horror, Science-fiction
- Notable works: El alarido de Dios, Cuentos inhumanos
- Website: vilarbou.com

José Miguel Vilar-Bou (born April 5, 1979, Alfafar, Valencia) is a contemporary Spanish novelist, short story writer, and journalist, specializing in horror fiction, science-fiction and fantasy. His work has been awarded with several prizes in literary competitions. His novel Alarido de Dios [The Cry of God] was a finalist for the Awards Celsius 2010 and his short story "El laberinto de la araña" ["The Spider's Labyrinth"] received in the same year the Nocte Award for the best Spanish horror story. In the Spanish Historia natural de los cuentos de miedo [Natural History of the Weird Tales], because of the "expeditious and accurate in its proposal", critic José L. Fernández Arellano mentioned this author's story "La luz encendida" as leading among the young writers' of the genre of horror in Spain.

== Biography ==
Vilar-Bou has lived in Italy, Belgium, Serbia, and London. As a journalist he has worked for several magazines and media, especially in the fields of events and current affairs, covering topics such as the war in the Balkans, drug trafficking and violent far-right groups. He worked in the newspaper El Mundo, in the edition of Valencia, into the section of events and courts, which, says the writer, deeply marked his literature; he also worked in the newspapers Diario de Valencia and Levante, especially on social issues. He also collaborated in the magazine Babylon, and the Babylon Radio program of Radio Exterior de España, Radio Nacional de España (RNE), and Agencia EFE. He has also occasionally written for the newspaper El País and, today, usually in eldiario.es.

Vilar-Bou has published primarily novels and stories generally of fantastic subject. His works have appeared in various magazines and anthologies, as Calabazas en el Trastero, EP3 y El Viajero (El País), Galaxia, Babylon Magazine, Historias asombrosas... His stories have been translated into English and Serbian.

== Bibliography ==
=== Novels ===
- Los navegantes (Grupo Ajec, 2007)
- Alarido de Dios (Equipo Sirius, Madrid, 2009)

=== Collections ===
- La quietud que precede (Ed. Diputación de Badajoz, 2009)
- Cuentos inhumanos (Ed. Saco de huesos, Valladolid, 2010)

=== Travelogues ===
- Diario de un músico callejero (Ed. Renacimiento – Espuela de Plata, Sevilla, 2013)

=== Short stories in anthologies/reviews ===
- Rev. Calabazas en el Trastero – Especial Barker, ed. Saco de Huesos, (Valladolid, 2012)
- Anth. Akasa-Puspa de Aguilera y Redal, ed. Sportula (2012): "El misterio de Rosetta"
- Rev. Calabazas en el Trastero – Nº 2, ed. Saco de Huesos (2010)
- Aquelarre. Antología del cuento de terror español actual: "La luz encendida", ed. Salto de Página (Madrid, 2010). Authors: Alfredo Álamo, Matías Candeira, Santiago Eximeno, Cristina Fernández Cubas, David Jasso, José María Latorre, Alberto López Aroca, Lorenzo Luengo, Ángel Olgoso, Félix Palma, Pilar Pedraza, Juan José Plans, Miguel Puente, Marc R. Soto, Norberto Luis Romero, Care Santos, José Carlos Somoza, José María Tamparillas, David Torres, José Miguel Vilar-Bou, and Marian Womack.
- Rev. Grádina, Serbia (2010): "La quietud que precede"
- Melocotón Mecánico (2009): "El laberinto reflejado"
- Rev. Calabazas en el trastero (2009): "El laberinto de la araña"
- Antología 7/8, Equipo Sirius (2009): "El final de la pesadilla"
- Rev. Babylon (2009): "Amante óvalo"
- Rev. Grádina, Serbia (2008): "Todas las canciones de amor"
- Rev. Historias Asombrosas (2008): "El hombre borrado"
- Rev. Historias Asombrosas (2008): "El amo invisible"
- Newspaper El País, suplemento 'El Viajero' (2008): "Fantasmas"
- Anth. King Kong Solidario, Planeta de Agostini (2008): "Rey Kong"
- Anth. Visiones (2006): "El dios reflejado en el espejo"
- Newspaper El País, suplemento 'EP3' (2006): "El Diablo me dijo"
- Rev. Galaxia (2004): "Vidas de piedra"

== Awards ==
- Nominated "Premio Ignotus" for Best Novelː Los navegantes (2008).
- Winner "Premio Nocte" for Best Short Storyː "El laberinto de la araña" (2010).
- Nominated "Premio Ignotus" for Best Novelː Alarido de Dios (2010).
- Nominated "Premio Celsius" of the Semana Negra de Gijón, for Best Fantasy Novelː Alarido de Dios (2010).
- Nominated "Premio Xatafi-Cyberdark", for Best Fantasy Novelː Alarido de Dios (2010).
- Winner "Premio Nosferatu" for Short Story Most Voted by Readers of the Anthology Calabazas en el Trasteroː "El laberinto de la araña" (2009).
- Nominated "Concurso Irreverentes" for Best Novel (2009).
- Winner Second Prize "Concurso de Cuentos Ilustrados" Diputación de Badajoz for Best Short Storyː "La quietud que precede" (2009).
- Winner "Concurso de relatos de La Semana del Estudiante", CEU for Best Short Story (2002).
