= Elvira Navarro =

Spanish writer (born 1978)

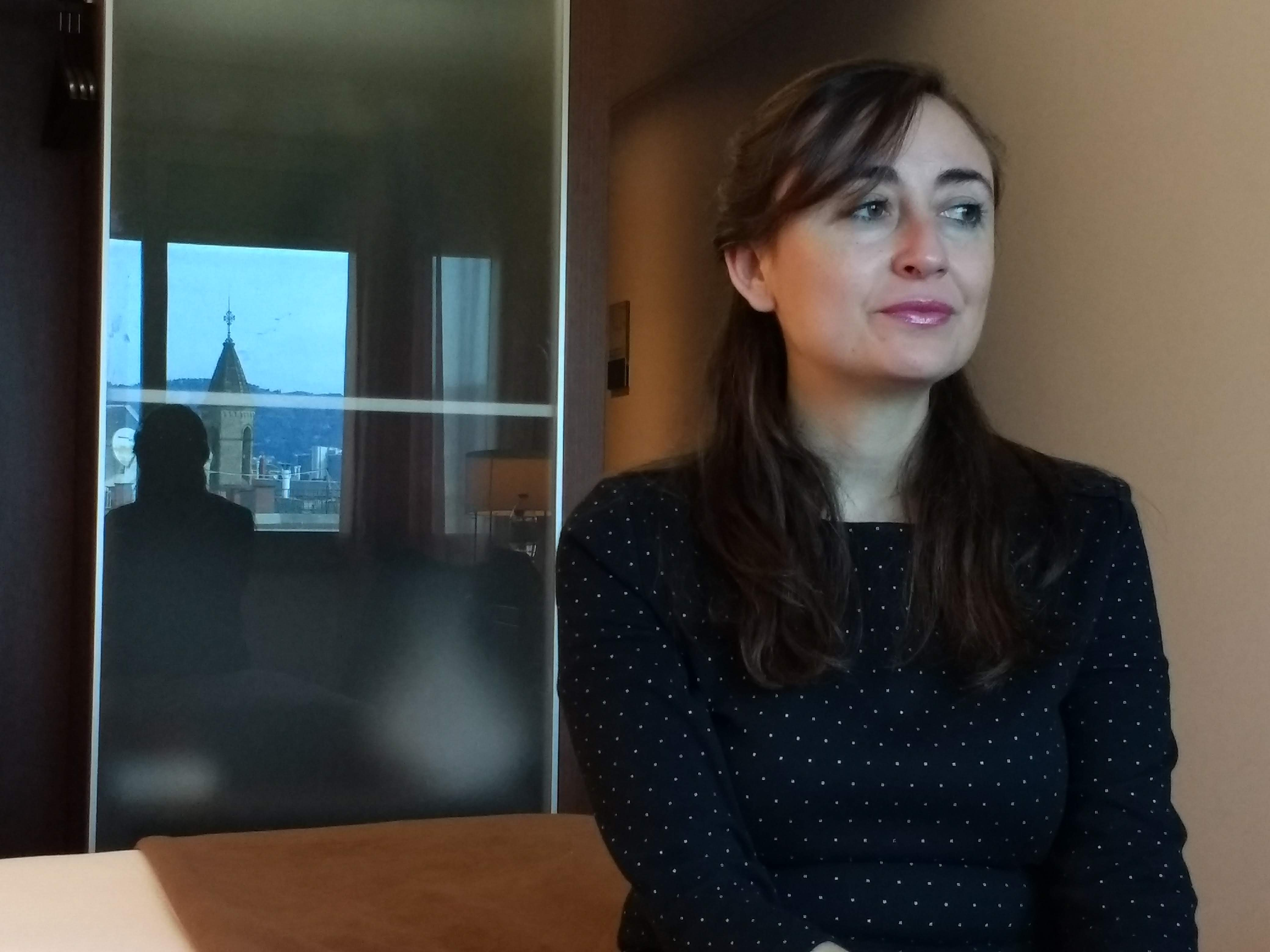
- Navarro in 2018
- Born: Elvira Navarro Ponferrada; 25 March 1978 (age 48); Huelva, Spain
- Education: Complutense University of Madrid
- Occupation: Writer
- Awards: Jaén Novel Award (2009)

Elvira Navarro Ponferrada (born 25 March 1978) is a Spanish writer.

== Career ==
Elvira Navarro holds a licentiate in Philosophy from the Complutense University of Madrid. In 2004 she won the City Council of Madrid's Young Creators Competition, and enjoyed a creative scholarship at the Residencia de Estudiantes. She has published two complementary books: La ciudad en invierno (The City in Winter) and La ciudad feliz (The Happy City), as well as the novels La trabajadora (The Working Woman) and Los últimos días de Adelaida García Morales (The Last Days of Adelaida García Morales). Her work has earned the Jaén Novel Award, the Tormenta en un vaso Award for Best New Author, and the Fnac New Talent Distinction. Navarro is also the author of the blog Periferia, an ongoing work on the neighborhoods of Madrid that explores bordering and undefined spaces. In 2010 she was included in the magazine Granta's list of the 22 best Spanish-language novelists under 35.

In 2013 she was selected as one of the Spanish voices with the greatest futures by El Cultural, and in 2014 the same magazine rated La trabajadora one of the ten best Spanish-language novels of the year. Portions of her work have been translated into English, French, Swedish, Italian, Turkish, and Arabic.

She has written for magazines such as El Cultural, Mirlo, Ínsula, Letras Libres, Quimera, Turia, and Calle 20, and for the newspapers Público, eldiario.es, El Mundo, and El País. She has performed literary criticism for Qué Leer, Revista de Libros, and the blog La tormenta en un vaso. She became editor of the Caballo de Troya imprint in 2015, and teaches writing workshops.

== Controversy ==
Her novel Los últimos días de Adelaida García Morales was harshly criticized by the filmmaker Víctor Erice in El País. Erice accused Navarro of trivializing the figure of Adelaida García Morales (his ex-wife), and causing grief to her loved ones by writing "a sort of fake fiction documentary" rather than a well-researched biography. Navarro's retort and various public interventions by other writers (such as Juan Marsé, in support of Erice) increased the controversy and the debate over the limits of fiction.

== Works ==
=== Novels and short stories ===
- La ciudad en invierno, Barcelona, Caballo de Troya, 2007; Debolsillo, 2008; Debolsillo 2012; ISBN 9788483467909
- La ciudad feliz, Barcelona, Mondadori, 2009, ISBN 9788439722663
- El invierno y la ciudad, RHM Flash (ePub), 2012, ISBN 9788415597360
- La trabajadora, Barcelona, Penguin Random House, 2014, ISBN 9788439728689
- Los últimos días de Adelaida García Morales, Barcelona, Random House, 2016, ISBN 9788439732075

=== Collective works ===
- Quince golpes en la cabeza, compilation by Ernesto Pérez Castillo, Havana, Editorial Cajachina, 2008
- Elegías íntimas. Instantáneas de cineastas, coordination by Hilario J. Rodríguez, Documenta Madrid, 2008
- Asamblea portátil. Muestrario de narradores iberoamericanos. Antología de última narrativa, selection and prologue by Salvador Luis, Lima, Editorial Casatomada, 2009
- Madrid / Barcelona. Literatura y ciudad (1995–2010), editing, introduction, and reading guide by Jorge Carrión, Madrid, Iberoamericana Editorial Vervuert and Cátedra Miguel Delibes (Valladolid), 2009
- The best of young Spanish language novelists, New York, Granta, 2010; Los mejores narradores jóvenes en español, Barcelona, Granta – Duomo, 2010
- Siglo XXI. Los nuevos narradores del cuento español actual, editing by Gemma Pellicer and Fernando Valls, Palencia, Menoscuarto Ediciones, 2010
- Chéjov comentado, editing by Sergi Bellver, Madrid, Nevsky Prospects, 2010
- Pequeñas Resistencias 5. Antología del nuevo cuento español (2001–2010), editing by Andrés Neuman, Madrid, Editorial Páginas de Espuma, 2010
- Los oficios del libro, various authors, Madrid, Libros de la ballena, 2011
- La ciudad contada: Buenos Aires en la mirada de la nueva narrativa hispanoamericana, editing by Maximiliano Tomas, Buenos Aires, Ministry of Culture of the City of Buenos Aires, 2012
- Cuentos en blanco y negro, editing by Miguel Ángel Oeste, Ministry of Culture of the City of Melilla, Manigua, 2012
- Passageways, editing by Camille T. Dungy and Daniel Hahn, San Francisco, Two Lines – World Writing in Translation, 2012
- En breve. Cuentos de escritoras españolas (1975–2010). Estudio y antología, editing by Ángeles Encinar and Carmen Valcárcel, Madrid, Editorial Biblioteca Nueva, 2012
- Mar de pirañas. Nuevas voces del microrrelato español, editing by Fernando Valls, Palencia, Menoscuarto, 2012, ISBN 9788496675896
- Madrid, con perdón. Editing and prologue by Mercedes Cebrián. Anthology of texts about Madrid by Fernando San Basilio, Esther García Llovet, Carlos Pardo, Juan Sebastián Cárdenas, Jimina Sabadú, Antonio J. Rodríguez, Óscar Esquivias, Natalia Carrero, Grace Morales, Jordi Costa, Álvaro Colomer, Iosi Havilio, Roberto Enríquez, and Elvira Navarro. Editorial Caballo de Troya, 2012
- Cuento español actual, compilation by Ángeles Encinar, Editorial Cátedra, 2013

== Awards and distinctions ==
- 2004: Young Creators Award from the City Council of Madrid
- 2007: Fnac New Talent Distinction for La ciudad en invierno
- 2008: Finalist for the Huelva Youth Awards
- 2009: 25th Jaén Novel Award for La ciudad feliz
- 2009: Evolución 09 El Duende/PlayStation Literary Creation Award
- 2009: La ciudad feliz chosen by Público's Culturas section as one of the year's eye-opening books
- 2009: 4th Tormenta en un vaso Award for Best New Author for La ciudad feliz
- 2009: Finalist for the 7th Dulce Chacón Spanish Narrative Award for La ciudad feliz
- 2014: La trabajadora chosen by El Mundo's magazine El Cultural as one of the year's best Spanish-language books
- 2017: Finalist for the 5th Premio de Narrativa Breve Ribera del Duero for La isla de los conejos
