= Pilar Pedraza =

Spanish professor, academic and writer

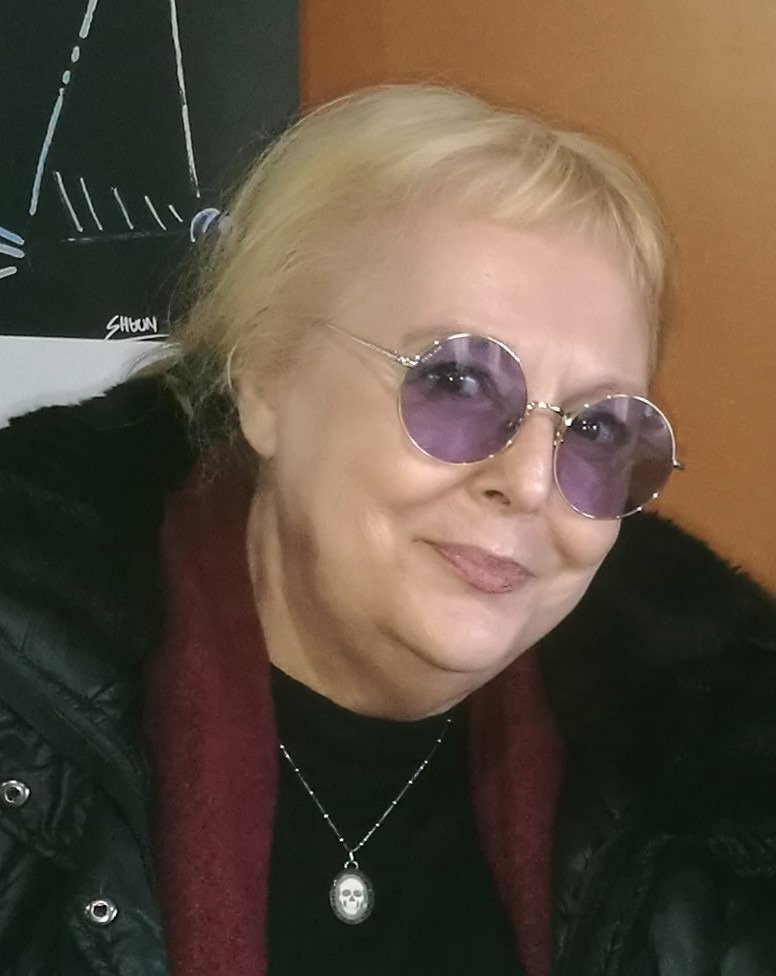
- Born: Pilar Pedraza Martínez; 12 October 1951 (age 74); Toledo, Spain
- Education: University of Valencia
- Occupations: Academic, writer
- Employer: University of Valencia
- Awards: Premio Ignotus (2005); Nocte Award (2013)

Councilor of Culture of the Generalitat Valenciana
- In office 1993–1995
- President: Joan Lerma

Pilar Pedraza Martínez (born 12 October 1951) is a Spanish professor and writer. Her work has two main aspects: horror narrative and essay.

== Biography ==
After earning her doctorate in history at the University of Valencia, Pilar Pedraza has been teaching Film and avant-garde cinema there since 1982. She was Councilor of Culture of the Generalitat Valenciana from 1993 to 1995, during the last term of Joan Lerma, and member of the Board of Directors of RTVV. Throughout her career, she has combined teaching and research with literary creation.

== Writing ==
=== Narrative ===
Pilar Pedraza's stories and novels present disturbing characters and environments, in which the sinister presence of the supernatural (dead that return to life, demons, enchanted objects) is associated with madness, death, and sadomasochistic pleasure. This theme, which dominates her first novel, Las joyas de la serpiente (1984), undergoes a gradual stylization in subsequent deliveries. In La perra de Alejandría (2003) Pedraza offers a peculiar version of the story of Hypatia (Melanta, in the novel), who is presented as a victim of the confrontation between the cult of Dionysus and that of Christ, led by the bishop Críspulo (an analogue of Cyril of Alexandria).

=== Essay ===
Pedraza's research focuses on three fields: art and society of the Renaissance and Baroque, cinema, and misogyny. The trilogy formed by La bella, enigma y pesadilla (1991), Máquinas de amar. Secretos del Cuerpo Artificial (1998), and Espectra. Descenso a las criptas de la literatura y el cine (2004) – the latter winning the 2005 Premio Ignotus for best essay book – explores different facets of fear and fascination caused in man by the image of the sinister woman, seen as a lethal seductress, android without soul, or corpse that defies death. Venus barbuda y el eslabón perdido (2009) continues this research path, addressing the bearded or hairy woman as a freak who transgresses the border between the two sexes and links the woman with the animal.

== Translation ==
Pedraza translated Francesco Colonna's work Hypnerotomachia Poliphili into Spanish as Sueño de Polífilo.

== Works ==
=== Narratives ===
- Las joyas de la serpiente (1984)
- Necrópolis (short stories) (1985)
- La fase del rubí (1987)
- Mater Tenebrarum (short stories) (1987)
- La pequeña pasión (1990)
- El gato encantado (1992)
- Las novias inmóviles (1994)
- Paisaje con reptiles (1996)
- Piel de sátiro (1997)
- Arcano 13, cuentos crueles (2000)
- Fantástico interior: antología de relatos sobre muebles y aposentos (2001)
- La perra de Alejandría (2003)
- El síndrome de Ambrás (2008)
- Lucifer Circus (2012)
- Lobas de Tesalia (2015)
- Mystic Topaz (2016)
- El amante germano (2018)
- Pánikas (2019)
- Eros ha muerto. Relatos impios (2019)

=== Essays ===
- Barroco efímero en Valencia (1982)
- Tratado de arquitectura de Antonio Averlino "Filarete" (1990)
- La bella, enigma y pesadilla (1991)
- Federico Fellini (1993)
- Máquinas de presa: la cámara vampira de Carl Th. Dreyer (1996)
- Máquinas de amar. Secretos del Cuerpo Artificial (1998)
- Metrópolis, Fritz Lang: estudio crítico (2000)
- "La mujer pantera": Jacques Tourneur (1942) (2002)
- Espectra. Descenso a las criptas de la literatura y el cine (2004)
- Venus barbuda y el eslabón perdido (2009)
- Brujas, sapos y aquelarres (2014)
- Jean Cocteau. El gran ilusionista (2016)

=== Translations ===
- La fuga de Atalanta: alquimia y emblemática (1989)
- Sueño de Polífilo (1999), ISBN 9788496834033

=== Anthologies ===
- Onírica, Hijos de Iquelo (short stories, prologue by Jack Ketchum, James Crawford Publishing, 2016)
- Aquelarre. Antología del cuento de terror español actual (short stories, Salto de Página, Madrid, 2010), ISBN 9788415065029
- La maldición de la momia. Relatos de horror sobre el antiguo Egipto. Navarro, Antonio José (ed.) Madrid, Valdemar, 2006, ISBN 8477025460

== Awards ==
- 1984 City of Valencia Award for Las joyas de la serpiente
- 1984 Critics' Award for Las joyas de la serpiente
- 2005 Premio Ignotus for Espectra. Descenso a las criptas de la literatura y el cine
- 2013 Nocte Award for Lucifer Circus
- 2016 Premio Sheridan Le Fanu de la Semana Gótica de Madrid for her literary career
