= José Vilar =

José Vilar may refer to:

- José de Nouvilas de Vilar (c.1843–c.1913), Spanish Puerto Rican soldier and politician
- José Miguel Vilar-Bou (born 1979), Spanish science-fiction and horror writer, and journalist
