= The Hunter's Sword =

Spanish comic

The Hunter's Sword is a Spanish comic created by the writer Rubén Serrano and drawn by the Colombian artist Esteban Patiño.

The comic was published in May 2010 in the online publication Exégesis and won the Ignotus Award in 2011 in the Best Comic category. The prize is awarded by the Fantasy, Science Fiction and Horror Spaniard Association.

The Hunter’s Sword is based upon a flash fiction micro-story written by Serrano, and was included in an anthology published in 2005. Despite the brevity of the story, the author presents a clear critique of imperialism past, present or future.
