= Botey =

Botey is a surname. Notable people with the surname include:

- Manuela Roka Botey, former prime minister of Equatorial Guinea
- Nuria C. Botey, Spanish fiction writer
