= International Poetry Festival of Rosario =

The International Poetry Festival of Rosario (in Spanish, Festival Internacional de Poesía de Rosario) is a cultural event organized in Rosario, Argentina. It gathers public and poets from Argentina and other countries, especially Latin American ones, and includes poetry readings, workshops, lectures, and stage plays.

The Festival is held annually since 1993. It usually takes place in September at the facilities of the Bernardino Rivadavia Culture Center, at Plaza Montenegro, in downtown Rosario. It is organized jointly by the Santa Fe Province Culture Subsecretariat and the Education and Culture Secretariat of the Municipality of Rosario, and is supported by the national Culture Secretariat.

== Poets who attended the festival ==
- Humberto Ak'Abal
- Rodolfo Alonso
- María Teresa Andruetto
- Roy Arad
- Elizabeth Azcona Cranwell
- Sergio Badilla Castillo
- Diana Bellessi
- Javier Bello
- Jorge Boccanera
- Miguel Bonasso
- Nicole Brossard
- Enrique Butti
- Daniel Calabrese
- Luz Caldas
- Dilan Camargo
- Arturo Carrera
- Julio Castellanos
- Atilio Castelpoggi
- Leopoldo Castilla
- Horacio Castillo
- Daniel Chirom
- Antonio Cisneros
- Marta Cwielong
- Theodore Damian
- Eduardo D'Anna
- Miguel Espeji
- Renée Ferrer
- Juan Gelman
- Joaquín Giannuzzi
- Hai Han
- Allison Hedge Coke
- Markus Hediger
- Jorge Isaías
- Ledo Ivo
- Verónica Jaffé
- Javier Jover
- Roberto Juarroz
- Viacheslav Kupriyanov
- Ana Emilia Lahitte
- Leónidas Lamborghini
- Ketty Lis
- Julio Llinás
- María Rosa Lojo
- Liliana Lukin
- Francisco Madariaga
- Jorge Madrazzo
- Circe Maia
- Roberto Malatesta
- Leonardo Martínez
- Rafael Matamoros
- Angela Melim
- Guy Nana Merlin
- Esteban Moore
- Andrés Morales
- Brane Mozetič
- Rafael Oteriño
- Olga Orozco
- Carlos Ortega
- Hugo Padeletti
- Aldo Parfeniuk
- Alex Pausides
- Rogelio Pizzi
- Osvaldo Pol
- Jean Portante
- Mauricio Redolés
- Victor Redondo
- Antonio Requeni
- Juan Manuel Roca
- Mercedes Roffé
- Gonzalo Rojas
- Elvio Romero
- Daniel Samoilovich
- Mayra Santos Febres
- Alejandro Schmidt
- Jorge Aulicino
- Jorge Fondebrider
- Gerardo Gambolini
- Marcos Silber
- Satoko Tamura
- Armando Trevisán
- Sara Vanegas Coveña
- Susana Vargas
- Rubén Vela
- Beatriz Vignoli
- Paulina Vindermann
- Héctor Yanover
- Laura Yasán
- José María Zamora
- Cayetano Zemborain
- Verónica Zondek
