= Carmen Conde Award =

Spanish literary prize

- Awarded for: Poetry by women
- Sponsored by: Ediciones Torremozas
- Country: Spain
- First award: 1984
- Website: http://www.torremozas.com/Premios/Premio-Carmen-Conde-de-Poesia-de-Mujeres

The Carmen Conde Women's Poetry Award (Spanish: Premio Carmen Conde de Poesía para Mujeres) is a Spanish literary prize organized by Ediciones Torremozas and dedicated exclusively to women authors. It is named in tribute to the writer Carmen Conde Abellán, the first woman to be named an academic numerary of the Royal Spanish Academy. The publishing company, Torremozas, was founded by poet Luz María Jiménez Faro to promote women's literature.

== Winners ==
| Year | Award | Work | Author | Ref |
|---|---|---|---|---|
| 1984 | 1st | El diván de la puerta dorada | Luisa Futoransky | |
| 1985 | 2nd | Dios y otros sueños | Isabel Abad | |
| 1986 | 3rd | Aquí quema la niebla | María Sanz | |
| 1987 | 4th | Los dioses y el ánfora | Julie Sopetrán | |
| 1988 | 5th | Os dije que existían | Carmen Albert | |
| 1989 | 6th | Un signo de los tiempos | Marta Pérez Novales | |
| 1990 | 7th | La tierra indiferente | María Luisa Mora | |
| 1991 | 8th | Un instante infinito | Rosa Martínez Guarinos | |
| 1992 | 9th | Al margen del deseo | Carmen González Marín | |
| 1993 | 10th | En la penumbra de Cuaresma | Carmen Gómez Ojea | |
| 1994 | 11th | No temerás | Juana Castro | |
| 1995 | 12th | La canción de Iseo | María del Mar Alférez | |
| 1996 | 13th | El silencio de la sirena | Ana María Rodríguez | |
| 1997 | 14th | Signos y otras señales | María Jesús Hernández | |
| 1998 | 15th | Cementerio de nadas | Dolors Alberola | |
| 1999 | 16th | Oficio del regreso | Josela Maturana | |
| 2000 | 17th | Herejía bajo la lluvia | Minerva Salado | |
| 2001 | 18th (ex aequo) | Un color inexistente Metafísica del trapo | Luisa Peluffo; Maria Eloy-García | |
| 2002 | 19th | El principio activo de la oblicuidad | Tina Suárez Rojas | |
| 2003 | 20th | Métricas del alma | Elena Soto García | |
| 2004 | 21st | Not given | | |
| 2005 | 22nd | Transmutaciones | Pilar González España | |
| 2006 | 23rd | Tela que cortar | Carmen Plaza | |
| 2007 | 24th | Disección | Care Santos | |
| 2008 | 25th | Poemas del amor sumiso | Ana Delgado Cortés | |
| 2009 | 26th | Ý (turno de réplica) | Anay Sala Suberviola | |
| 2010 | 27th | Estaciones en exilio | Clara Eugenia Ronderos | |
| 2011 | 28th | Animal de presa | Laura Yasán | |
| 2012 | 29th | Menos miedo | María García Zambrano | |
| 2013 | 30th | Los seres quebradizos | Rocío Hernández Triano | |
| 2014 | 31st | Documentum | Sara Herrera Peralta | |
| 2015 | 32nd | El bolso de Mary Poppins | Julia Conejo Alonso | |
| 2016 | 33rd | Anatomía de un insomnio | Silvia Rodríguez Bravo | |
| 2017 | 34th | La estación de las moras | Ángela Álvarez Sáez | |
| 2018 | 35th | Balkánica | Martha Asunción Alonso | |
