= Cristina Jurado =

Spanish writer and editor

- Born: 1 February 1972 (age 54); Madrid, Spain
- Education: Northwestern University
- Occupations: Writer, editor
- Awards: Ignotus Award (2016, 2017)
- Website: masficcionqueciencia.com

Cristina Jurado Marcos (born 1 February 1972) is a Spanish writer and publisher of fantasy and science fiction, the winner of three Ignotus Awards. She has written two novels, several short stories, and edited multiple anthologies, as well as numerous articles and interviews in the magazine Supersonic, which she also directs.

== Biography ==
Cristina Jurado was born in Madrid in 1972. She studied Advertising and Public Relations at the University of Seville, and earned a master's degree in Rhetoric from Northwestern University in Illinois. She resides in Dubai.

As a writer she published her first novel, Del Naranja al Azul in 2012, defined as a book of "Mediterranean science fiction", which was followed by stories in various anthologies and fanzines of the genre. In 2017 she published the novella CloroFilia, which she defines as "a post-apocalyptic and weird story that deals with collective madness and human identity." Also in 2017 she won an Ignotus Award for Best Story for "La segunda muerte del padre", published in the Nevsky Prospect anthology Cuentos desde el Otro Lado.

As an editor, her work has focused on the direction of the digital magazine Supersonic and on the publication of anthologies. She founded Supersonic in 2015, bringing together fiction and nonfiction in Spanish and English. The magazine has stood out as a springboard for new voices in Spanish science fiction, and has won several awards. In 2016 it won the European Science Fiction Society's award for Best Fanzine, and in 2017 won in the Best Magazine category. It also won the Ignotus Award for Best Magazine. One of Jurado's articles, "Antologías de ciencia ficción en España", published in the first issue of Supersonic, won the Ignotus for Best Article. In the field of anthologies, her publication Alucinadas stands out, with two volumes focused on getting to know science fiction writers, both unpublished and more recognized.

She has collaborated with international publishers, including for the North American Apex Magazine. In 2015, she was guest editor for its issue number 76, dedicated to international fiction. The collaboration was consolidated in 2017 with Apex's announcement of her hiring as editor of international fiction beginning in January 2018. For her editorial work promoting authors, she has worked with media outlets such as El País and El Salto.

== Works ==
=== Novels ===
- Del Naranja al Azul (Novum Publishing, 2012), ISBN 9788490393024

=== Novellas ===
- CloroFilia (Editorial Cerbero, March 2017).

=== Anthologies ===
- Alucinadas I, together with María Leticia Lara Palomino, (Palabaristas 2014), ISBN 9789874584021
- Whitestar, (Palabaristas, 2016)

=== Short stories ===
- "Rem", in Ellos son el futuro (Ficción Científica, 2013)
- "El pastor", in Retrofuturismos. Antología steampunk (Fábulas de Albión imprint of Ediciones Nevsky, 2014)
  - Translated into English by James Womack in The Best of Spanish Steampunk (Ediciones Nevsky, 2015)
- "Antonio Benjumea", in Crónica de Tinieblas (Sportula, 2015), ISBN 9788415988694
- "Hambre", in Supersonic #1, 2015
- "El niño que diseccionaba ranas", in El laberinto mecánico #1, 2015
- "Out of Context", in the anthology Los irregulares (Cazador de Ratas, 2015)
- "Un cuento de abducciones", in Martians Go Home (Revista NGC3660, 2016)
- "Haitzlurra" in Retrofuturismos (Cazador de Ratas, 2016)
- "Inchworm", in the anthology Whitestar (Palabaristas, 2016)
- "La segunda muerte del padre", in the anthology Cuentos desde el Otro Lado (Fábulas de Albión imprint of Ediciones Nevsky, 2016), ISBN 9788494455568
- "Gemelos", in Origen Cuántico, 2017
- "Heroína", in Barcelona Review, 2017
- "Alice", in the anthology Alphaland (Nevsky 2018), ISBN 9788494591389

=== Illustrated stories ===
- "Vanth", illustrated by Ana Galvañ (Sisterhood Madrid y Ofegabous, 2016)

== Awards ==
- 2016: ESFS Award for Best Fanzine for Supersonic
- 2016: Ignotus Award for Best Article for "Antologías de ciencia ficción en España" (Supersonic #1)
- 2017: ESFS Award for Best Magazine for Supersonic
- 2017: Ignotus Award for Best Story for "La segunda muerte del padre" (anthology Cuentos desde el Otro Lado)
- 2017: Ignotus Award for Best Magazine for Supersonic
