= Nuria C. Botey =

Spanish writer (born 1977)

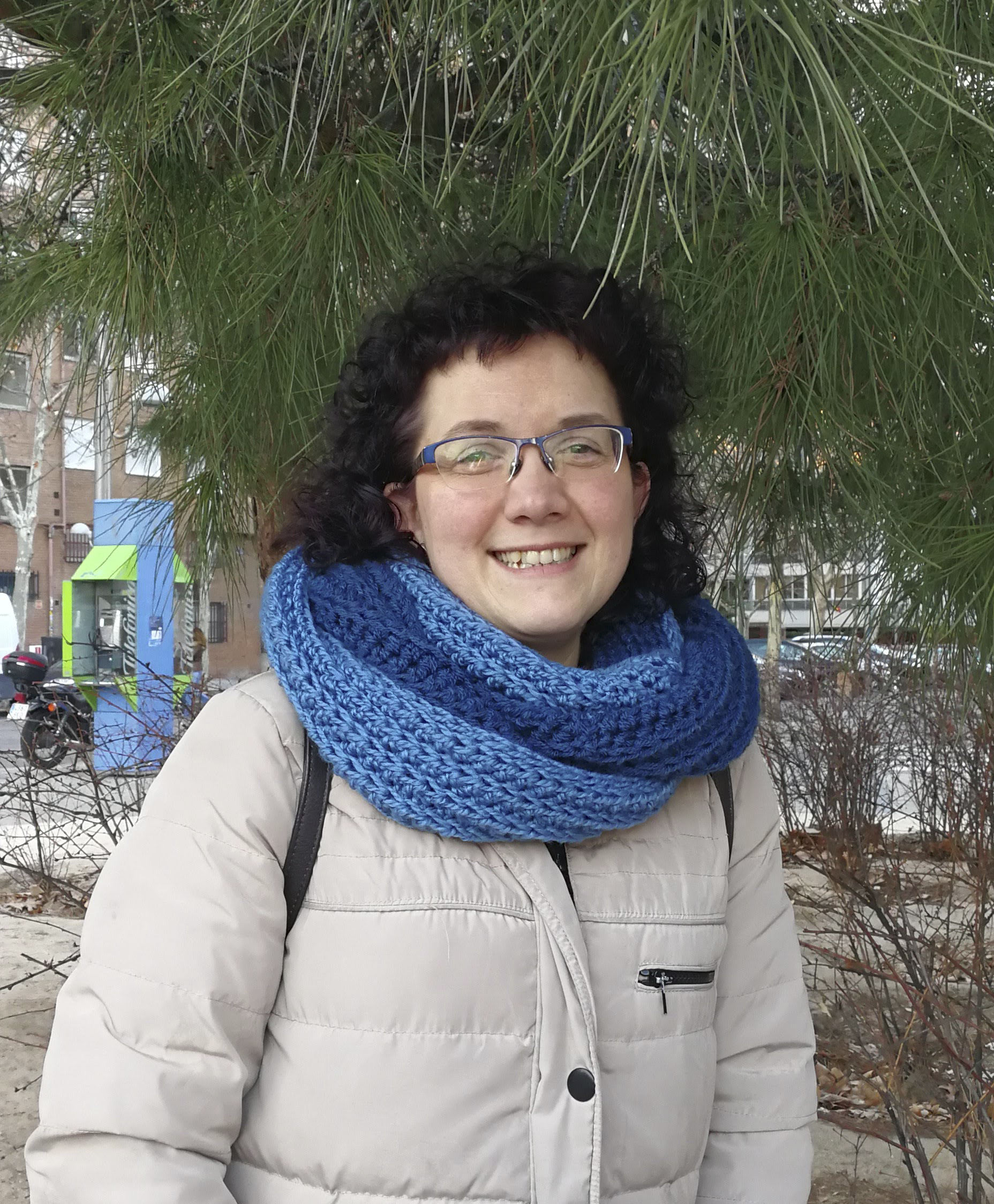
- Born: Nuria Calderón García-Botey; 8 March 1977 (age 49); Madrid, Spain
- Other name: Pablo Castro
- Education: Complutense University of Madrid
- Occupations: Writer, professor
- Awards: Pablo Rido Award (2003); Nocte Award (2013)
- Website: www.nuriacbotey.es

Nuria Calderón García-Botey (born 8 March 1977), known professionally as Nuria C. Botey, is a Spanish fantasy, science fiction, and horror writer.

== Biography ==
Nuria C. Botey holds a doctorate in Social Psychology from the Complutense University of Madrid, a master's degree in Communication and Social Skills for Intervention in Groups from the University of Seville, and has worked as a professor of university studies in Psychology. She has been a member of the Madrid Tertulia of Fantasy Literature (TerMa), of the Spanish Horror Writers Association (Nocte), and of the literary group La Hermandad Poe, coordinated by poet Fernando López Guisado. She has also written children's literature and erotic novels on LGBT topics, under the pseudonym Pablo Castro.

== Work ==
Botey has collaborated on more than 20 collective works, such as 2005's Visiones (an anthology sponsored by the Spanish Association of Fantasy, Science Fiction, and Horror, Artifex, and Axxón), and the horror anthologies Paura, La sangre es vida (2010), Taberna Espectral (2011), Legendarium (2012), and Anatomías Secretas (2013). She is the author of the micro fiction book Circo de Pulgas (2011), later published as Mosquitos en tu alcoba (2014), and the story anthology Vosotros justificáis mi existencia (2012), later Nunca beses a un extraño (2016), for which she received the Nocte Award in 2013. In 2017 she published the novel Plata pura, un lobo hombre en Madrid.

She also participated in the children's story anthology Los terroríficos cuentos de Raxnarín, a solidarity initiative to support integration projects for children affected by spina bifida. Her story "La evolución de la especies" has been translated into French by Marie-Anne Cleden in the anthology Monstres! As Pablo Castro, she has published two erotic novels: Los chicos de la Costa Azul (2007) and Hollywood Life (2008).

== Awards and recognitions ==
In 1993, at age 16, Botey won her first award: Alfaguara's Los Nuevos Prize, with her story "Una auténtica pena". She was also the first woman to win the Pablo Rido Award for Fantasy Short Story (2003), with the work Dancing with an Angel. The following year, she won the 17th Clarín Short Story Award with "Vosotros justificáis mi existencia", included in the compilation of the same name which won the 2013 Nocte Award for Best National Story Anthology.

In 2014, she was recognized by Ultratumba magazine for the best story appearing in the anthology Anatomías Secretas. "Suburbano" won fourth place in the 4th Solidaridad Obrera "Un metro de 350 palabras" Short Story Prize in 2006. "Taquillera" also won the second prize in the award's 6th edition in 2008.
