= Gabriel Bermúdez Castillo =

Spanish writer (1934–2019)

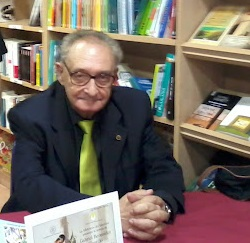
- The author in 2015
- Born: 29 June 1934; Valencia (Spain)
- Died: 19 May 2019 (aged 84); Elche (Spain)
- Occupations: Lawyer, notary and writer
- Writing career
- Period: 1971–2015
- Genres: Fantasy, Science fiction

Gabriel Bermúdez Castillo (born 29 June 1934 in Valencia, Spain – d. 19 May 2019) was a Spanish writer and important author in Spanish science fiction.

== Life ==
Born in Valencia, Spain, Bermúdez Castillo lived from the start of the Spanish Civil War in 1936 and until 1980 in Zaragoza, living later in Cartagena, working as lawyer and notary.

Bermúdez Castillo began writing short stories and tales published in Spanish fanzines in 1969. His first science fiction book, El Mundo Hokun, published in 1971, was an anthology with five tales, one of which won a European SF Award in 1972.

He published nine novels, three collections and more than twenty short stories and novellas, some considered classics of Spanish science fiction, and was awarded in 1991 with the Spanish science fiction literary Alberto Magno Prize, and two times, in 1994 and 2002, with the Ignotus Award. He also received a Jury Mention in the 1991 UPC Science Fiction Awards. His short story 1944 was translated and published in French in 1981, while an edition of the tale Cuestión de oportunidades was published in English (as Opportunities Galore) in 1978. In 2012 his novel Viaje a un planeta Wu-Wei was translated and published in Polish as Podróż na planetę wu-wei. In 2014, his novel El Señor de la Rueda (1978) was adapted and published as tabletop role-playing game by Editorial Epicismo.

== Works ==
- El Mundo Hokun (1971)
- Viaje a un planeta Wu-Wei (1976)
- La piel del infinito (1978)
- El Señor de la Rueda (1978)
- El seguro refugio de las colinas (1985)
- Golconda (1987, anthology)
- El hombre estrella (1988)
- Duerme querido monstruo (1991)
- Un mundo dura mil años (1991)
- Salud mortal (1993)
- Instantes estelares (1994)
- Demonios en el cielo (2001)
- El país del pasado (2003)
- Mano de galaxia (2 Bde., 2008)
  - Golconda
  - Haladriel
- Espíritus de Marte (2012)
- Los herederos de Julio Verne (2013)
- La casa de la vaguada (2015)

== Bibliography ==
- Hans Joachim Alpers, Werner Fuchs, Ronald M. Hahn: Reclams Science-fiction-Führer. Reclam, Stuttgart 1982, ISBN 3-15-010312-6, S. 90.
