= The Map of Time =

2008 novel by Félix J. Palma

- First edition (Spanish)
- Author: Félix J. Palma
- Series: Trilogía Victoriana
- Genre: Science fiction
- Publisher: Algaida
- Publication date: 2008
- Publication place: Spain
- English publication date: 2011
- Media type: Print (Hardback)
- Pages: 720
- ISBN: 978-1451683035
- Followed by: The Map of the Sky

The Map of Time (first published in Spanish in 2008 as El mapa del tiempo and in 2011 in English translation) is a science fiction novel by Spanish writer Félix J. Palma. The novel follows three interwoven story lines. The book has been called "part mystery, part fantasy, and part historical fiction".

The book is the first part of his "Trilogía Victoriana". The second book, The Map of the Sky (featuring H. G. Wells's The War of the Worlds), was released in late 2012. The third, The Map of Chaos, was released in Spanish on October 16, 2014, and in English translation on June 30, 2015.

== Development ==
Palma said of the development that the story could not be written from a single point of view nor by a narrator who followed only one character. It required an omnipresent narrator who could tell all of the stories together.

== Plot ==
The story follows three interwoven plots:

- The story of Andrew Harrington, a man who fell desperately in love with "Marie Jeanette Kelly" (or "Mary Kelly"), one of the victims of Jack The Ripper. Harrington falls into a deep depression after discovering Kelly's body, and turns to alcohol and eventually opium to cope with the grief. He eventually decides to commit suicide, but is interrupted by his cousin Charles, who begs him to come with him to meet a man who claims he can travel in time.
- The story of Claire Haggerty, a "New Woman" and feminist who is deeply unhappy with her life. She is supposed to choose a husband, but most of her suitors are only interested in her finances or in the continuation of their family line. Haggerty stumbles upon "Murray's Time Travel", and meets Captain Derek Shackleton, the man who leads the human race in the battle against the machines in the year 2000.
- The final section of the story focuses on HG Wells himself, as he tries to discern if the fourth dimension is actually something that can be broken through, or if it is just a storytelling mechanism (like in the stories he writes). He discovers the "Map Of Time" in a house in London (that is reputedly haunted), he discovers that time is not a plaything – and his actions could have serious repercussions.

== Reception ==
The Map of Time won the 2008 Ateneo de Sevilla XL Prize, and was mostly well received.

AVClub.com said the book is "packed with flowery language, and it features a playful narrator who's concerned with keeping the reader's attention as he bounces from character to character." The Washington Post praised the book but remarked, "Fans of serious science fiction may find the story too metafictional. (Others may object that it’s clogged with too many adjectives.)" The Los Angeles Review of Books said that a passage in the book (during which H. G. Wells criticizes some writing) is similar to problems with Palma's writing, "inevitably produc[ing] boredom in the reader, or if not, then a profound aversion to what he is reading", but also stated, "Palma demonstrates a real skill at storytelling, especially character development and narrative suspense."
