= Laura Yasán =

Argentine poet (1960–2021)

- Born: 20 October 1960; Buenos Aires, Argentina
- Died: 20 June 2021 (aged 60); Caballito, Buenos Aires, Argentina
- Occupation: Poet
- Notable work: La llave Marylin
- Awards: Casa de las Américas Prize (2008)
- Website: www.laurayasan.com.ar

Laura Yasán (20 October 1960 – 20 June 2021) was an Argentine poet.

== Career ==
Laura Yasán was born in Buenos Aires on 20 October 1960. Throughout her career, she organized writing workshops in penitentiary units, homes for minors, asylums, and libraries. In April 2016, she coordinated an experimental workshop on creative writing and psychodrama at the University Cultural Center of the National University of the Northeast (UNNE). In 1988 she joined the 3rd Antología Ilustrada de poesía joven, and later the poetic anthology Zapatos Rojos 2000. Her work was partially translated into English and published in the journal Poetry Ireland Review in 2002.

In 1998, she became part of A*(punto) Prieto, a women's group dedicated to literature.

Yasán participated in various poetry festivals and literary encounters, such as the International Poetry Festival of Rosario, the 13th International Poetry Festival of Medellín, the 1st International Poetry Festival in Lima (2012), the Latin American Poetry Festival in Buenos Aires (June 2015), the 2nd Correntino Poetry Festival, and the Poetry Festival in Mendoza (2016).

With the authors Jorge Boccanera, Patricia Díaz Bialet, and Juano Villafañe, she wrote the collective poem Con un tigre en la boca. Manual de los amantes in 2016.

Yasán died on 20 June 2021.

== Works ==
- Cambiar las armas (1st ed.). Buenos Aires: Botella al Mar. 1997. ISBN 978-950-513-277-5.
- Loba negra (1st ed.). Buenos Aires: La Bohemia. 1999. ISBN 978-987-97444-0-6.
- Cotillón para desesperados (1st ed.). Buenos Aires: La Bohemia. 2001. ISBN 978-987-1019-06-9.
- Tracción a sangre (1st ed.). Buenos Aires: La Bohemia. 2004. ISBN 978-987-1019-19-9.
- Ripio (1st ed.). Buenos Aires: Grupo Editor Latinoamericano. 2007. ISBN 978-950-694-781-1.
- La llave Marilyn (1st ed.). Buenos Aires: Del Dock. 2010. ISBN 978-987-559-143-1.
- Pequeñas criaturas de lo incesante (1st ed.). Buenos Aires: Zona Borde. 2015. ISBN 978-987-45769-3-4.
- Palabras no (1st ed.). Buenos Aires: Zona Borde. ISBN 978-987-4120-00-7. (compilation)
- Ganado en su ley (1st ed.). Palabrava. ISBN 978-987-4156-00-6.

== Awards ==
- EDUCA Singular Poetry Award (Costa Rica, 1998), for Loba negra
- Fondo Nacional de las Artes Award (Buenos Aires, 1998)
- 4th City of Medellín International Poetry Award (Colombia, 2002), special mention of the jury for Cotillón para desesperados
- Casa de las Américas Prize, Cuba 2008
- First Prize in Unpublished Poetry, Municipal Prizes of the city of Buenos Aires (2011)
- Carmen Conde Award, Madrid, Spain, 2011
