= Luisa Futoransky =

Argentine writer (born 1939)

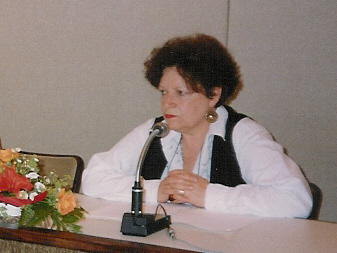
Luisa Futoransky in 1993

Luisa Futoransky (born January 5, 1939) is an Argentine writer, scholar and journalist living in France.

== Early life ==
The daughter of Alberto Futoransky and Sonia Saskin de Milstein, she was born in Buenos Aires. Futoransky studied music with Cátulo Castillo and worked in the National Library under Jorge Luis Borges before leaving Argentina in 1971 to participate in the International Writing Program at the University of Iowa. She has lived in Italy, Spain, China and Japan, where she taught opera at the National Academy of Music, and China; since 1981, she has lived in France. Her family moved to Israel at the end of 1975.

== Biography ==
Luisa Futoransky has lived in Italy, Spain, Japan, where she taught opera at the National Academy of Music, and China; since 1981, she has lived in France. Her family moved to Israel at the end of 1975.[3] Her first book of poetry Trago fuerte (Strong drink) was published in 1963. It was followed by El corazón de los lugares (The Heart of Places) in 1964, Babel Babel in 1968 and Lo regado por lo seco (The watered for the dry) in 1972.

Futoransky was the first recipient of the Carmen Conde Women's Poetry Award in 1984. She was named a Chevalier in the French Ordre des Arts et des Lettres in 1990 and, in 1991, was awarded a Guggenheim Fellowship.

Her writing has been translated into English, French, Hebrew, Portuguese, Italian, Japanese and German. Her works have appeared in the journals Hispamérica, World Fiction, El Universal and Taifa and selected works appeared in the anthologies The House of Memory: Stories by Jewish Women Writers of Latin America and Miriam's Daughters: Jewish Latin American Women Poets. Fluent in Spanish, French, English, Hebrew and Italian, Luisa’s work brings together an incredibly rich array of cultural references inspired by her experiences living in Latin America, Europe and the Far East, which she blends together with distinctive images of home (Argentina). In 1971 she was a member of the International Writing Program from Iowa City, Iowa. She is regularly invited to lecture at prestigious universities in France, Spain, Argentina and United States. Likewise, she is regularly invited as a guest author to international literary festivals. Luisa’s work is often cited in studies of contemporary Argentine women’s writing as well as those dealing with issues of exile, transnational identity, language, contemporary Latin American poetry or Argentine writers in Paris.

== Bibliography ==
=== Selected works ===
- Babel, Babel. Buenos Aires: Ed. La Loca Poesía, 1968 (poetry)
- Lo regado por lo seco. Buenos Aires: Ed. Noé, 1972 (poetry)
- El nombre de los vientos. Zaragoza: Aljafería, 1976 (poetry)
- Partir, digo (To leave, I say), Valencia: Ed. Prometeo, 1982 (poetry)
- Son cuentos chinos (Those are Chinese tales), Madrid: Ed. Albatros, 1983 (novel)
- El diván de la puerta dorada, Madrid: Ed. Torremozas, 1984 (poetry), received the Carmen Conde Prize
- De Pe a Pa (From Peking to Paris), Barcelona: Editorial Anagrama, 1986 (novel)
- La sanguina, Barcelona: Ed. Taifa, 1987 (poetry)
- Urracas (Magpies), Buenos Aires: Planeta, 1992 (novel)
- La parca, enfrente, Buenos Aires: Libros de Tierra Firme, 1995 (poetry)
- Cortezas y fulgores, Albacete: Editorial Barcarola, 1997 (poetry)
- De dónde son las palabras, Barcelona: Plaza & Janés, 1998 (poetry)
- París, desvelos y quebrantos, New York: Pen Press, 2000 (poetry)
- Estuarios, Buenos Aires: Ediciones del Mate, 2001 (poetry)
- Prender de gajo, Madrid: Editorial Calambur, 2006 (poetry)
- Inclinaciones, Buenos Aires: Editorial Leviatán, 2006 (poetry)
- Seqüana Barrosa, Jerez: EH, 2007 (poetry)
- El Formosa, Buenos Aires: Leviatán, 2010 (novel)
- 23:53 - Noveleta, Buenos Aires: Leviatán, 2013 (novel)
- Ortigas (Nettles), Buenos Aires: Leviatán, 2014 (poetry)
- Marchar de día, Buenos Aires: Editorial Leviatán, 2017 (poetry)
- Humus, humus, Buenos Aires: Editorial Leviatán, 2020 (poetry)

=== Translations ===
- The Duration of the Voyage. Selected Poems. Edited & translated by Jason Weiss. San Diego: Junction Press, 1997
- Nettles. Translated by Philippa Pag. London: Shearsman, 2016

=== Translations into Spanish of other authors' poetry ===
- Sol Negro, Aco Šopov, poeta macedonio, en colaboración con Jasmina Šopova. 2011. Editorial Leviatán, Bs As.
- Poesía contemporánea en lengua hebrea - Antología 2012, Libros del aire, Madrid. Traducción del hebreo por Luisa Futoransky y Marta Teitelbaum.
