= Luisa Peluffo =

Argentine writer and journalist

- Born: August 20, 1941 (age 85); Buenos Aires, Argentina
- Occupations: Writer, journalist
- Writing career
- Genre: Various

Luisa Peluffo (born August 20, 1941) is an Argentine writer and journalist.

Peluffo was born in Buenos Aires. In 1977, she took up residence in San Carlos de Bariloche in the province of Río Negro, Argentina. Her residence in Patagonia is reflected in her writing, particularly in Me voy a vivir al sur, one of her most popular books. There she shares the experience to move from her urban life in Buenos Aires to the extreme south of her country. In 1988, she was awarded the scholarship Creation in Narrative by the Fondo Nacional de las Artes (National Endowment for the Arts). In 2001, her book Un color inexistente received the Carmen Conde Women's Poetry Award. In 2008, her novel Nadie baila el tango (No one dances the tango) (Ediciones Gárgola, 2008) was awarded the first prize for unpublished novels given by the Gobierno de la Ciudad de Buenos Aires (Buenos Aires City government). An English translation of her story "Flechas" ("Arrowheads") was published in the book Argentina: A Traveler’s Literary Companion (Whereabouts Press, 2010).

== Published work ==
- Fotografías (poems) – Ediciones Gárgola, Buenos Aires, 2014
- Se llaman valijas (stories) – Ediciones Gárgola, Buenos Aires, 2012
- Nadie baila el tango (novel) – Ediciones Gárgola, Buenos Aires, 2008
- Me voy a vivir al sur (chronicle) – First edition: Editorial de los Cuatro Vientos, Buenos Aires, 2005; Second edition: Ediciones Gárgola, Buenos Aires, 2010
- Un color inexistente (poems) – Ediciones Torremozas, Madrid, España, 2001
- La doble vida (novel) – Editorial Atlántida, Colección Voces del Plata, Buenos Aires, 1993
- La otra orilla (poems) – Editorial Ultimo Reino, Buenos Aires, 1991
- Todo eso oyes (novel) – Emecé Editores, Buenos Aires, 1989
- Materia de revelaciones (poems) – Ediciones Botella al Mar, Buenos Aires, 1983
- Conspiraciones (stories) – First edition: Fundación Banco de la Provincia de Buenos Aires, Buenos Aires, 1982; Second edition: Editorial Universitaria de Buenos Aires, Buenos Aires, 1989
- Materia viva (poems) – Editorial Schapire, Colección Poetas Populares, Buenos Aires, 1974

== Other contributions ==
- Arrowheads (short story) – Argentina: A Traveler's Literary Companion, edited by Jill Gibian, Whereabouts Press, 2010
- La doble vida (excerpt) – Relatos de Patagonia, edited by María Sonia Cristoff, Editorial Cántaro, 2005
- Si canta un gallo (play) – El país teatral Serie Premios, Editorial Inteatro, 2005

== Sources ==
- Lorente-Murphy, Silvia. Las voces no-oficiales en Todo Eso Oyes de Luisa Peluffo. Revista Confluencia Vol. 8, No. 1, pp. 149–153, University of Northern Colorado, 1992 - ISSN 0888-6091.
