= Stranded (2001 film) =

2002 film by María Lidón

- Theatrical release poster
- Directed by: María Lidón
- Written by: Juan Miguel Aguilera
- Produced by: José Magán
- Starring: Vincent Gallo; Maria de Medeiros; Joaquim de Almeida; Maria Lidón; Daniel Aser; Johnny Ramone; José Sancho; Paul Gibert
- Cinematography: Ricardo Aronovich
- Edited by: Luis de la Madrid
- Music by: Javier Navarrete
- Distributed by: Universal Pictures, Niggeman IndieFilms S.L
- Release dates: September 24, 2001 (San Sebastián Film Festival); April 12, 2002
- Running time: 95 minutes
- Country: Spain
- Language: English
- Budget: 810 million ₧

Stranded is a 2001 English-language Spanish science fiction film about a fictional first crewed mission to Mars. It stars Vincent Gallo and Maria de Medeiros, and was directed by Spanish filmmaker and actress María Lidón (credited in the English version of the movie as "Luna"), with screenplay by Spanish science fiction author Juan Miguel Aguilera. Lidón won the "Grand Prize of European Fantasy Film in Silver", and Gallo and de Medeiros were named best actors at the 2002 Fantafestival in Rome.

== Plot ==
The film is set in 2020 and begins as the Ares spacecraft enters orbit around Mars. Andre Vishniac commands an international crew of seven astronauts. They try to land, but the small lander crashes as a result of an altimeter error. Vishniac is immediately killed, and five other crew members are stranded inside the toppled landing craft, unable to return to the waiting Ares orbiter. With no spare landing vessel, Lowell, the pilot of the Ares, returns to Earth with it.

It will take 26 months for Lowell to send a rescue ship from Earth, but the stranded landing crew have supplies for less than a year and need to find ways to extend the life support system. The main problem is the thermoelectric power generator, since air and water recycling require electrical power. Since the lander is damaged beyond repair, it no longer requires fuel, and Sagan (the mission geologist) proposes to use what is left to power a makeshift silicate reactor to produce methane and water vapor from the Martian soil. They try to build it, but the landing engines and propellant tanks prove to be too damaged to salvage.

The landing crew tries to find ways to save electrical power, but even draconian measures will only extend the life of the generator to fourteen months. The required lifetime can be attained only if the crew is reduced to two astronauts. Sanchez, the new commander, decides that she, Sagan and Rodrigo should abandon the craft, since their specialist skills are less important to the survival of the mission. They don their spacesuits and walk to the edge of the Valles Marineris valley, not far from the crash site. Recent radar scans from the orbiter reveal a maze-like structure hidden below a thick cloud of water vapor in the Valles Marineris. The structure appears artificial and is virtually identical to another one near the Martian south pole. The three astronauts try to reach the bottom of the valley before they run out of oxygen.

Sagan dies of asphyxiation, but Sanchez and Rodrigo stumble upon an artificial tunnel near the bottom of the valley, containing the mummified bodies of humanoid alien beings. They find that the air pressure and oxygen content in some of the tunnels is just like that on Earth. Rodrigo dies when accidentally entering a tunnel with no atmosphere, but Sanchez manages to contact the two astronauts still at the lander, who have meanwhile discovered that they are gradually losing air pressure and have realised that there must be an air leak somewhere. Sanchez urges them to join her, as there is enough oxygen and water in the valley for them to survive until the rescue ship arrives.

== Cast ==
Actor	Role
Vincent Gallo	Luca Baglioni, Mars lander mission specialist, technical systems engineer
Maria de Medeiros	Jenny Johnson, Mars lander mission specialist, doctor
Joaquim de Almeida	Fidel Rodrigo, Mars lander mission specialist, astrobiologist
Maria Lidón	Susana Sánchez, Mars lander pilot
José Sancho	Andre Vishniac, Mars lander commander
Danel Aser	Herbert Sagan, Mars lander mission specialist, geologist
Johnny Ramone	Lowell, Mars orbiter pilot

== Filming locations ==
The scenes set on the surface of Mars were filmed on Lanzarote, and the interior scenes were filmed at Panavision Studios in Hollywood. To save costs, they used the Space Shuttle interior set previously used for Space Cowboys.

== See also ==
- List of films set on Mars
