= Eduardo Vaquerizo =

Spanish writer of science fiction, horror and fantasy

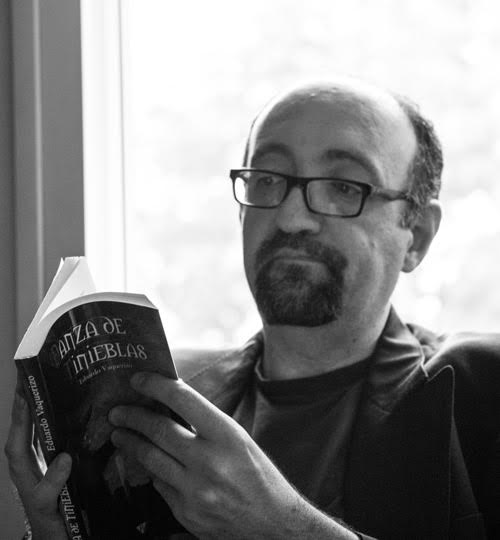
- Born: Eduardo Vaquerizo Rodríguez; 7 July 1967 (age 59); Madrid, Spain
- Occupations: Writer, Aerospace engineer
- Writing career
- Notable works: Dance of Darkness (2005), Hypatia's Last Night (2009)
- Notable awards: Domingo Santos Award (2000), Ignotus Award for Best Short Novel (2001 and 2013), Best Short Story (2004), and Best Novel (2006, 2010, and 2014), Celsius Award (2016)

Eduardo Vaquerizo Rodríguez (Madrid, July 7, 1967) is a spanish writer of science fiction, horror and fantasy short stories and novels.

Eduardo Vaquerizo is a writer who combines hard and soft science fiction. Although some of his work can be ascribed to hard science fiction, which reflects his training as an aerospace engineer, or even a tribute to the pulp genre, his stories mainly include uchronies, steampunk and postcyberpunk stories, and experiments that border on the dreamlike and surrealist.

Throughout his work, his search for highly visual images and his desire to construct a musical cadence in his writings stand out. Thematically, he has frequently explored the presentation of mentalities completely alien to our own and has analyzed what we understand as reality, whether virtual or not.

Since his novels Dance of Darkness (2005) and The Last Night of Hypatia (2009), he has included historical elements in his work, which in the series that began with Dance of Darkness itself take the form of a peculiar uchronia, in which the Spanish Empire does not disappear, but advances technically and economically by not expelling jews and "moorish" and by adopting a peculiar form of Protestantism.

He was selected for the first anthology of Spanish steampunk authors translated into English, The Best of Spanish Steampunk, edited and translated by James and Marian Womack.

Between October 1998 and July 2000 he was vice president of the Spanish Association of Fantasy and Science Fiction.
