= Pascual Enguídanos =

Spanish writer (1923–2006)

Pascual Enguídanos Usach, (Liria, Spain 13 December 1923 - 28 March 2006) also known by his pseudonyms George H. White and Van S. Smith, was a Spanish science fiction writer.

== Works ==
His principal work, published under the name George H. White, is the series known as La saga de los Aznar (The Saga of Aznar). This series was originally published by publishing house in Valencia two seasons, the first part between 1953 and 1958 (just in the novel Fight to death, Tome 12), and the second part between 1973 and 1978, which were recast the first works and added new novels and written in 70 years, thus providing the historical range of an unexpected below (volumes 13 to 23).

- TOMO 1º Los hombres de Venus, El planeta Misterioso, Cerebros electrónicos. ISBN 84-95820-30-7
- TOMO 2ª La Horda Amarilla, Policía sidereal, La Abominable Bestia Gris. ISBN 84-95820-31-5
- TOMO 3º La conquista de un Imperio, El Reino de las Tinieblas. ISBN 84-95820-38-2
- TOMO 4º Salida hacia la Tierra, Venimos a destruir el mundo y Guerra de autómatas. ISBN 84-95820-40-4
- TOMO 5º ¡Redención no contesta!, Mando siniestro, División X. ISBN 84-95820-07-2
- TOMO 6º Invasión nahumita, Mares Tenebrosos. ISBN 84-95820-08-0
- TOMO 7º Contra el Imperio de Nahúm y La Guerra Verde. ISBN 84-95820-11-0
- TOMO 8º Motín en Valera y El enigma de los Hombres Planta. ISBN 84-95820-12-9
- TOMO 9º El azote de la humanidad - El coloso en rebeldía- La Bestia capitula. ISBN 84-95820-16-1
- TOMO 10º ¡Luz sólida! - Hombres de titanio- Ha muerto el Sol. ISBN 84-95820-17-X
- TOMO 11º Exilados de la Tierra- El imperio milenario. ISBN 84-95820-23-4
- TOMO 12º Regreso a la patria.- Lucha a muerte. ISBN 84-95820-24-2
- TOMO 13º Universo remoto - Tierra de titanes. ISBN 84-95820-28-5
- TOMO 14º El angel de la muerte - Los nuevos brujos. ISBN 84-95820-29-3
- TOMO 15º Conquistaremos la Tierra - Puente de mando. ISBN 84-95820-36-6
- TOMO 16º Viajeros en el tiempo - Vinieron del futuro. ISBN 84-95820-37-4
- TOMO 17º Al otro lado del Universo - El planetillo furioso - El ejército fantasma. ISBN 84-95820-41-2
- TOMO 18º ¡Antimateria! - La otra Tierra. ISBN 84-95820-42-0
- TOMO 19º Un millón de años - La rebelión de los robots. ISBN 84-95820-54-4
- TOMO 20º Supervivencia - ¡Thorbod, la raza maldita!. ISBN 84-95820-55-2
- TOMO 21º El retorno de los dioses: La tierra después. ISBN 84-95820-62-5
- TOMO 22º Los últimos de Atolón: Guerra de autoplanetas. ISBN 84-95820-63-3
- TOMO 23º La civilización perdida: Horizontes sin fin: El refugio de los dioses. ISBN 84-95820-64-1
- Extra: TOMO 24º Robinsones cósmicos: Dos mundos frente a frente ISBN 978-84-95820-65-5
- Extra: TOMO 25º El atom S-2: Embajador en Venus ISBN 978-84-95820-73-0
- Extra: TOMO 26º Y el mundo tembló - La gran aventura - Piratería sideral (Trilogía de FinanISBN 978-84-95820-95-2) amongst others.
