= Marian Womack =

Speculative fiction author

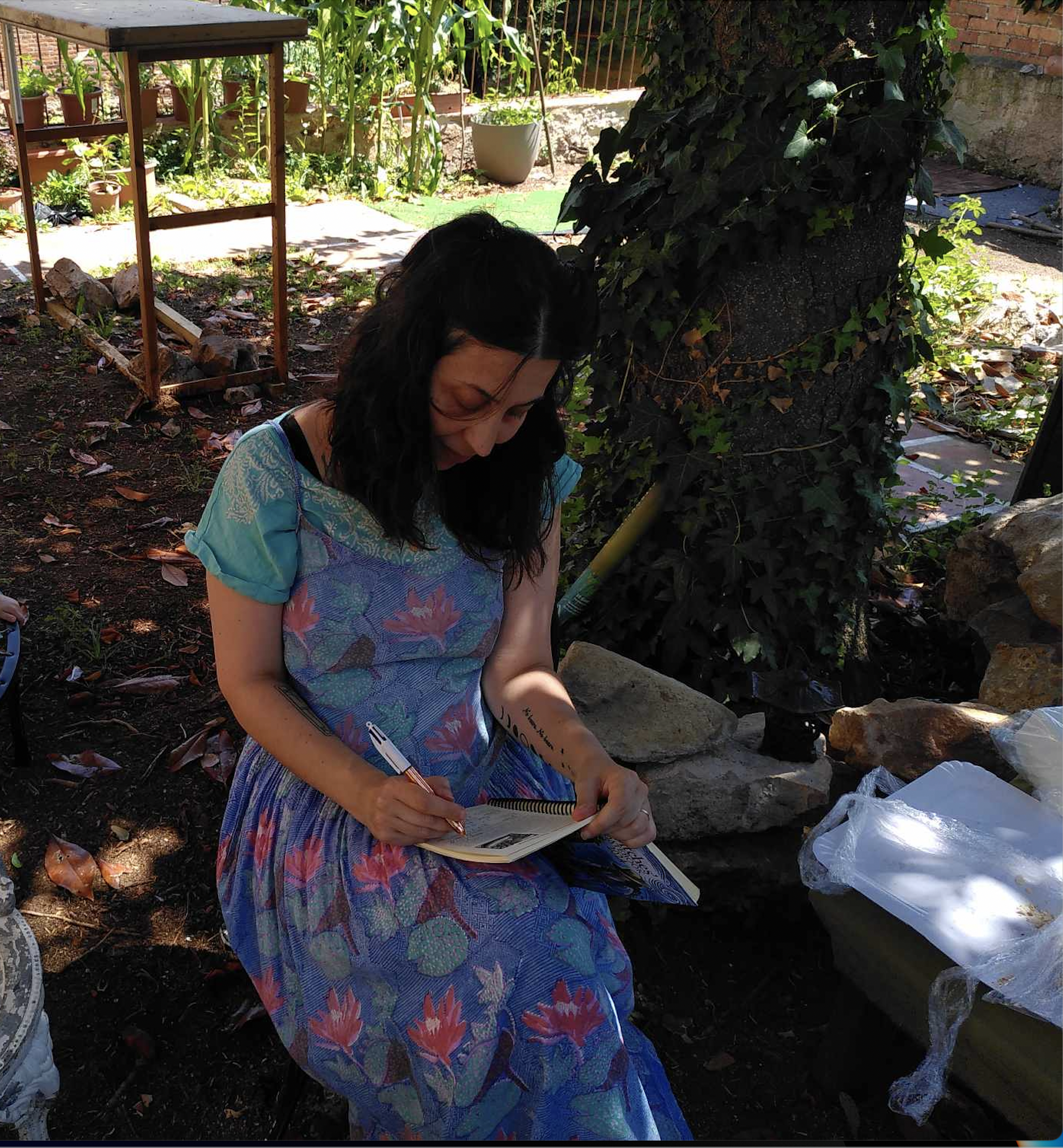
- Womack teaching a workshop in Spain in 2023.
- Education: Glasgow University; Wadham College (University of Oxford); Wolfson College (University of Cambridge); Anglia Ruskin University
- Occupations: Writer, translator and editor
- Notable work: Lost Objects, The Swimmers
- Website: www.marianwomack.com

Marian Womack is a bilingual Spanish-British writer, translator and editor of weird fiction, horror, speculative fiction, science fiction and Fiction of the Anthropocene. She lives in Cambridge, UK. As a translator in Spain she has worked mostly for independent publishing houses. She writes both in English and Spanish. Womack has been included in various collective works in Spain and Latin America, the UK, the US and Australia. Her writing is characterised by mixing elements from the Gothic, Science Fiction and Horror, creating a hybrid genre that Womack uses to highlight the uncanny. She often uses fragmentation, writes experimental prose, and mixes genres.

Womack has published two collections of short fiction and three novels in English, as well as two novels in Spanish. Her ecological fiction has been included in international art installations, translated to Italian and Norwegian, and shortlisted for two British Fantasy Awards and one British Science Fiction Association Award.

== Early life and education ==
Womack was born in Cádiz and studied in the UK. She studied English Literature with Film Studies (Glasgow University), holds a Master's in European Literature (Oxford University), a DEA in Literatura Comparada (Universidad Autónoma de Madrid), a Master's in Creative Writing (University of Cambridge) and a PhD in Creative Writing (Anglia Ruskin University).

== Career ==
In her work as a publisher, Womack co-founded, together with British translator and poet James Womack, the indie press Nevsky Prospects, specialising in Russian Literature. The press mainly published Russian and Soviet genre fiction (Science fiction, Gothic) together with classic authors such as Pushkin, Dostoevsky or Dmitri Grigorovich, offering a wide and non-mainstream understanding of this literature. Womack coordinated the imprint Fábulas de Albión, which she used to publish, for the first time in Spanish, female speculative fiction authors such as Nina Allan, Lisa Tuttle, Anna Starobinets or Karin Tidbeck. In 2015, Spanish magazine Leer included Womack in its list of the most influential people under forty in Spanish publishing.

Womack has worked in academic libraries and archive collections for more than a decade, including Oxford University's Bodleian Library, and the Modern and Medieval Faculty Library at Cambridge University, where she worked as Hispanic and Lusophone Librarian for five years. She also works intermittently as editor, translator, and bookseller. Womack has taught creative writing, publishing studies and book history in Spain and the UK. Womack is the first Spanish person to attend the Clarion Workshop.

== Critical reception ==
Womack published her first collection in English, Lost Objects, in 2018. Nina Allan wrote in Interzone: "[T]he themes of climate change and ecological destruction are more urgently expressed in this short book than in any other I have recently read... This book, with its sharp edges and its thematic urgency and its painful admissions of weakness and of fear, is a collection that highlights everything that speculative fiction, of all possible modes of literature, excels at." Laura Mauro wrote in Black Static that "Lost Objects is a gorgeous, intelligent collection, both masterfully written and cannily prescient." Timothy J. Jarvis wrote in the Los Angeles Review of Books that Lost Objects addresses "humankind's senseless despoliation of its home in subtle, profoundly affecting ways."

Womack's first novel in English, The Golden Key (2020), was described by Publishers Weekly as an "ethereal debut novel, precise and eerie... Patient readers willing to wade through Womack's murky, off-kilter world will be rewarded with moments of disquieting beauty." Womack's second novel The Swimmers (2021) was given a Starred Review in Publishers Weekly. The Guardian said it was "a richly imagined eco-gothic tale", and The Times said it was "exquisitely realised", selecting it as one of the ten best science fiction novels of 2021.

== Personal life ==
Womack is married to British poet and translator James Womack. They met while they were both students at Wadham College, Oxford. Womack cannot vote in the UK, but she is a member of the Green Party of England and Wales. Womack studied at a convent school, and has written about her rejection of Catholicism as an institution.

== Published works ==
=== Narrative ===
Novels

Science Fiction

- The Swimmers, London, Titan Books, 2021. ISBN 978-1-78909-421-3 (Novel)

The Walton & Waltraud Inquiry Agents Mysteries

- On the Nature of Magic, London, Titan Books, 2023. ISBN 978-1-80336-134-5 (Novel)
- The Golden Key, London, Titan Books, 2020. ISBN 978-1-78909-325-4 (Novel)

Spanish

- Calle Andersen, Barcelona, La Galera, 2014. ISBN 978-84-246-5239-5 (Novel). With Sofia Rhei.
- Memoria de la nieve Zaragoza, Tropo Editores, 2011. ISBN 978-84-96911-34-5 (Novel)

Short Fiction in English

Collections

- Out of the Window, Into the Dark, Cambridge, Calque Press, 2024 ISBN 978-1-9162321-7-4
- Lost Objects New Extended Edition, Cambridge, Calque Press 2024 ISBN 978-1-9162321-9-8
- Lost Objects, Edinburgh, Luna Press Publishing, 2018 ISBN 978-1-911143-39-0

As editor

- An Invite to Eternity: Tales of Nature Disrupted. 2019, Cambridge, Calque Press, 2019. With Gary Budden ISBN 978-1-9162321-0-5
- The Best of Spanish Steampunk, Madrid, Nevsky Books. With James Womack
- Retrofuturismos. Antologia Steampunk. Madrid, Fábulas de Albión. ISBN 978-84-941637-7-7

Short fiction in anthologies and magazines

- "Ready or Not", in Isolation, The Horror Anthology (Titan Books, 2022), edited by Dan Coxon ISBN 978-1-80336-068-3
- "At the Museum", in Uncertainties, Vol. 4 (Swan River Press, 2020), edited by Timothy Jarvis
- "One, Two, Three", in The Shadow Booth, Vol. 4 (2019), edited by Dan Coxon
- "Nox Una", in The Silent Garden, a Journal of Esoteric Fabulism (Undertow Publications, 2018), edited by Michael Kelly
- "Mrs. Fox", in LossLit (November 2017), edited by Aki Schilz and Kit Caless.
- "Pink Footed", EcoPunk! Speculative Tales of Radical Futures (Ticonderoga Publications, 2017), edited by Liz Grzyb and Cat Spark ISBN 978-1-925212-54-9
- "The ravisher, the thief", Barcelona Tales (NewCon Press, 2016), edited by Ian Whates. ISBN 978-1-910935-27-9
- "Stones", SuperSonic (October–November 2016), edited by Cristina Jurado.
- "Orange Dogs", Weird Fiction Review, ed. Jeff VanderMeer (October 2015). Reimpreso in Year's Best Weird Fiction (vol. 3) (Undertow Publications, 2016), edited by Simon Strantzas and Michael Kelly.
- "Black Isle", Spanish Women of Wonder (Palabaristas, 2016). Reimpreso in A Dying Planet. Short Stories (Flame Tree Press, 2020).
- "Frozen Planet", Apex Mag Special International Issue #76 (September 2015)

Short Fiction in Spanish

- "Nox una", in Aquelarre. Antología del cuento de terror español actual ISBN 978-84-15065-02-9
- "Help Needed", in La banda de los corazones sucios. Antología del cuento villano Madrid, Ediciones Baladí, 2010, edited by Salvador Luis. ISBN 78-84-937661-6-0 (collective work). Reimpreso en La banda de los corazones sucios. Antología del cuento villano La Paz, Editorial El Cuervo, 2010. Selección y prólogo de Salvador Luis. ISBN 978-99954-749-3-5 (collective work)
- En la tierra del lobo, in Al otro lado del espejo, Madrid, Editorial Escalera, 2010. ISBN 978-84-938363-6-8 (collective work)
- «Matrioshka», in Rusia Imaginada, Madrid, Nevsky Prospects, 2011, edited by Care Santos (collective work)
- «In a glass, darkly», Steampunk: antología retrofuturista, edited by Félix J. Palma. Fábulas de Albión, 2012. ISBN 978-84-939379-3-5
- «Montañas», Náufragos de San Borondón: Antología hispanoamericana de narradores Tenerife, Baile del Sol, 2012, edited by Javier Vázquez Losada. ISBN 978-84-15019-88-6 (collective work)

=== Academic works ===
Books

- Beauty is Complicated: Essays on the Weird. Cambridge, Calque Press, 2024 ISBN 978-1-7384836-0-0
- Beyond the Back Room. New Perspectives on Carmen Martin Gaite. With Jennifer Wood. Oxford, Peter Lang, 2010. ISBN 978-3-03911-827-4

Essays

- 'It's about to get crazy, it's about to get loud!: Weird Ecopoetics at the end of the world' in Writing the Future: Essays on Crafting Science Fiction. Dead Ink Books. Ed. Dan Coxon & Richard V. Hirst, 2023 ISBN 978-1-915368-02-7
- 'Introduction', The Topless Tower by Silvina Ocampo. Calque Press, 2023 ISBN 978-1-9162321-4-3
- 'Introduction', An Invite to Eternity: Tales of Nature Disrupted. Calque Press, 2019 ISBN 978-1-9162321-0-5
- 'Nature has at last escaped from their discipline and their fetters: Ostranenie and the Ecological sublime in Jeff VanderMeer's Annihilation and Brian Catling's The Vorrh'. WorldCon. The World Science Fiction Convention (Helsinki). Academic Track – Environmental Anxieties, 2017
- Profile on Rosa Montero's SF novels, EuroCon Convention Book. BCon, 2016
- 'The Invasion of the Body-Snatchers' / 'Stalker': Ciencia Ficción: Cien Películas Imprescindibles. JotDown Books, 2015 ISBN 978-84-943733-0-5

=== Translations ===
- Cuando sale la luna by Gladys Mitchell. ISBN 978-84-939379-2-8
- En trineo y a caballo hacia los leprosos abandonados de Siberia by Kate Marsden. ISBN 978-84-938246-9-3
- El muñeco by Daphne du Maurier. ISBN 978-84-939379-0-4
- Paseando con fantasmas. Antología del cuento gótico. ISBN 978-84-8393-086-1
- La hija del rey del país de los Elfos by Lord Dunsany. ISBN 978-628-7540-63-7
- Transformación. Cuentos góticos by Mary Shelley. ISBN 978-84-8393-063-2
- Formas del amor by David Garnett. ISBN 978-84-92865-13-0
- Para leer al anochecer. Cuentos de fantasmas de Charles Dickens by Charles Dickens. With Enrique Gil Delgado. ISBN 978-84-937601-0-6
- Rusia gótica. With James Womack. ISBN 978-84-937466-1-2
- Las vírgenes sabias by Leonard Woolf. ISBN 978-84-937110-2-3
