= La saga de los Aznar =

Series of science fiction novels by Pascual Enguídanos

La saga de los Aznar is a work of 32 science fiction novels by Spanish writer Pascual Enguídanos. They were published in Spain between 1953 and 1958 (first part) and 1973 and 1978 (second part) in the Luchadores del Espacio collection by Editorial Valenciana and they appeared under the pseudonym George H. White. It received the European SF Award for Best Cycle of Novels at the Eurocon in Brussels in 1978.

The work represents a Spanish equivalent of science fiction and space opera that populated North American pulp fiction in the nineteen thirties and forties, a trend in which were forged such great authors as E.E. Doc Smith, Jack Williamson and Edmond Hamilton. The series has an adventurous nature and nostalgia for a bygone era. It contains a distinctly epic war and all kinds of adventures, while collecting a certain respect for science and technology which are not as battered as other works of that time.

Likely having copied the term orbimotor from Jose Elola, a.k.a. Colonel Ignotus, it non-the-less contains the aesthetics of Alex Raymond's, Flash Gordon: the prose is very visual. Enguídanos had a special interest in Mongo-styled planets, with its mix of future and archaic, feudal regimes, princes and lords despotic, primitive peoples oppressed, and, of course, men of silicon, insect men, floor men, or fish men.

Enguídanos' early works reflected classical space-opera, but very soon the Saga of Aznar was leading towards a unique epic among the stars, with a trace of classical myths. If Aeneas escaped from destroyed Troy to cross a sea unknown and found a distant colony which would be the birthplace of an empire, Rome and the first Aznar lead the survivors of the invasion of Earth by an alien species to a distant star to rebuild the lost homeland, Inci thereby in the collective ownership of the people valerano (Valera, an original 'autoplaneta') were heirs of mankind.

Enguídanos' series is likely of a number unparalleled in all of science fiction. In Saga, futuristic technology meets a very specific logic and originality: 'metal hyperdensity that repels the gravity low electric induction', ships that simulate cetacean space forms, the sidereal armed with millions of ships in battle over the fate of mankind, Z-rays, "sunlight" as a lethal weapon or as interstellar propellant, and the fabulous machines Karendon (inclusive of the field as the famous Star Trek transporters but brought here to their logical conclusion).

Beyond the adventures of war and futurism, Saga is also a very comprehensive utopian science fiction. A future society where the players have all the elements that characterize it as utopian, where money has been eliminated and automation has freed the human race from work. But in utopias of science fiction things are not so placid and well run; the island of Utopia (the Earth's future or any of its stellar colonies, including such wandering colony which is the fabulous autoplaneta Valera) is subjected to terrible dangers and frightening threats.

Saga stresses a realistic treatment of the characters: Unlike other series, the protagonists of the Saga not only live their lives in fullness of adventure and excitement, but also are born and die as in real life. The novels allow the reader to accompany the vicissitudes of mankind through family members of the first protagonist (the aviator Miguel Angel Aznar de Soto), who is thrown from the contemporary period, after an adventure in search of 'flying saucers' in the Himalayas, to an unlikely but highly suggestive Venus' Jurassic, and finally to five centuries in the future with the Earth on the brink of a dreadful World War and the shadow of an even more horrific alien invasion looming.

Step by step, without giving rest to the suffering humanity, Enguídanos describes the vicissitudes of future exiles from the land, citizens of the Federation Ibero, who manage to escape the invasion of the "abominable gray beast, thorbod".

Pascual Enguídanos not only achieved a long series of novels, but managed to keep a cycle of tension and growing interest, by constantly evolving the plot and characters. Enguídanos, with ups and downs in the 'normal' range, managed to maintain and even improve the quality as the Saga progressed.
