= Santiago Eximeno =

Spanish writer (born 1973)

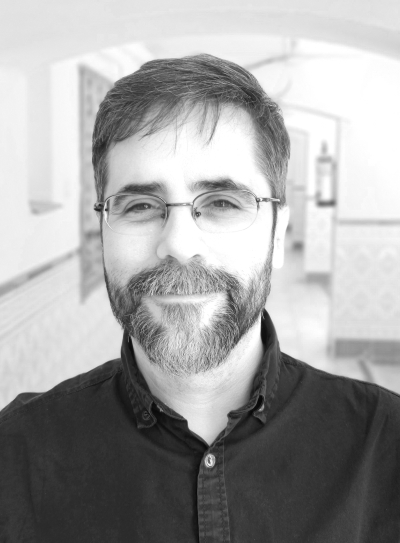
- Hernamperez in 2023
- Born: Santiago Eximeno Hernampérez; 23 May 1973 (age 53); Madrid, Community of Madrid, Spain
- Writing career
- Language: Spanish
- Genres: Science fiction, horror, fantasy
- Notable awards: Ignotus Awards: best short story (2003, 2006 and 2008), best anthology (2009), best poetic work (2013) and best short novel (2013)
- Website: www.eximeno.com

Santiago Eximeno Hernamperez (born 23 May 1973) is a Spanish novelist and creator of multiple board games.

Eximeno has published the novels Condenados (2011),Asura (2004) and Lancolía (2022), and the short story books Bebés jugando con cuchillos (2008) and Obituario Privado (2010), as well as numerous short stories in different anthologies and magazines.

Eximeno's works have been translated into several languages and he has won various prizes, such as the Ignotus Prize which he won 4 times, awarded to him by the Spanish Association of Fantasy, Science Fiction and Terror (AEFCFT), for his short stories and short story books.

In 2012 Eximeno created the board game Invasion (Edge, 2012) with Peter Belushi and published the book Umbría (2012).
