= Mercedes Roffé =

Argentine poet (born 1954)

- Born: 23 June 1954 (age 72); Buenos Aires, Argentina
- Education: University of Buenos Aires; New York University (PhD)
- Occupations: Poet; translator; essayist
- Writing career
- Notable awards: Guggenheim Fellowship (2001)

Mercedes Roffé (born 23 June 1954) is an Argentine poet. She has published several poetry collections and was a 2001 Guggenheim Fellow in poetry.

== Biography ==
Mercedes Roffé, of Jewish origin, was born on 23 June 1954 in Buenos Aires. She originally studied music for at least a decade as a youth, but dropped it after graduating from a music school, though she was an ensemble's Medieval-Renaissance vocalist. She obtained a profesora de letras modernas degree from the University of Buenos Aires in 1978.

Roffé has published several poetry collections, including El tapiz (1983), Cámara baja (1987), Canto errante, Memorial de agravios (both 2002), La ópera fantasma (2005), Las linternas flotantes (2009), Diario ínfimo (2016). In 2001, she was awarded a Guggenheim Fellowship in poetry. One of the poems in La ópera fantasma uses a two-column format where short words are tracked in an anagram-like format within a longer word (in this case, paisaje); this proved a challenge for translators, with Roffé requesting that they reproduce the format in their respective languages. Her 2017 poetry volume El desierto y el oro, according to Megumi Andrade Kobayashi, juxtaposes the desert and emptiness against gold and fullness, respectively. In 2022, a festschrift of her work, titled Iluminado artificio. Ensayos sobre la obra de Mercedes and edited by Eugenia Straccali, was published by the National University of Villa María's EDUVIM press. She often uses musical terms in the names of her poems, noting that she often "indicate[s] that a poem should be thought—at least vaguely—as related to or redolent of a musical form".

In 1993, Roffé obtained a PhD from New York University; her doctoral dissertation was titled La cuestión del género en Grisel y Mirabella de Juan de Flores. She published a monograph of the same name in 1996, centered on the titular Juan de Flores novel. She was a speaker at the XXIV Annual Conference on Latin American and Spanish Literature, held at the Montclair State University Student Center in April 2003. She has also taught at Vassar College and The New School for Social Research. She works as editorial director for contemporary poetry press Ediciones Pen Press.

Roffé lives in New York City, having moved to Manhattan in 1995. Roffé stated on her experiences with living outside her native country: "I do not feel at all like a poet or an intellectual in exile, because I came to the United States in 1985, when my country had already embarked on a very clear democratic process; thus, I have the privilege of having had the choice to come and the choice to stay".

== Works ==
- Poemas 1973-1975 (1978)
- El tapiz de Ferdinand Oziel (1983)
- Cámara baja (1987)
- La Cuestión del género en Grisel y Mirabella de Juan de Flores (1996)
- La noche y las palabras (1996)
- Definiciones mayas (1999)
- Antología poética (2000)
- Canto errante (2002)
- Memorial de agravios (2002)
- La ópera fantasma (2005)
- Las linternas flotantes (2009)
- Diario ínfimo (2016)
- El desierto y el oro (2017)
