= Juan Miguel Aguilera =

Spanish science fiction author

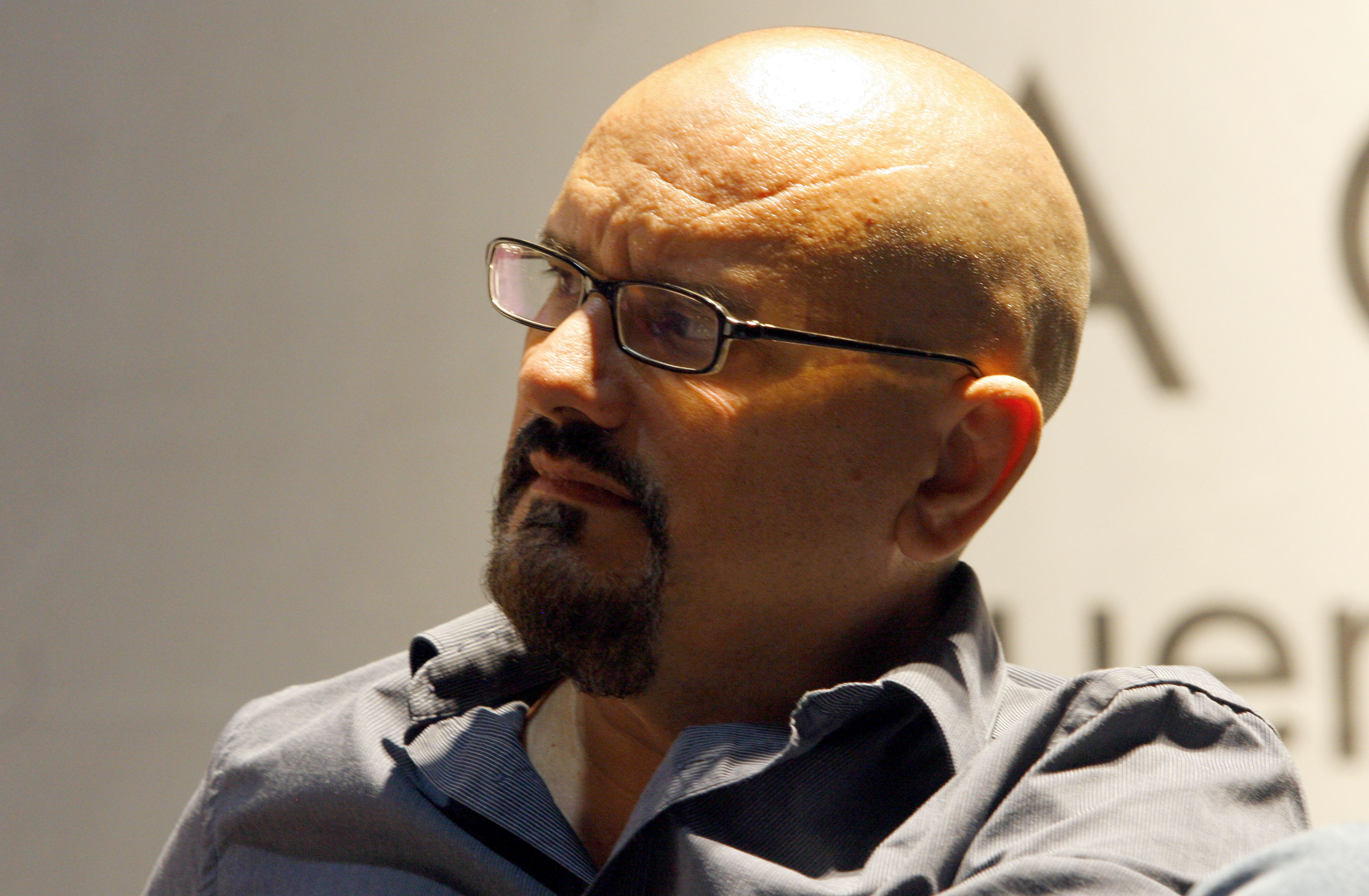
A picture of Juan Miguel Aguilera

Juan Miguel Aguilera (born in Valencia in 1960) is a Spanish science fiction author.

He was first trained as an industrial designer. As an author, he has received the Ignotus prize, the Alberto Magno prize, and the Juli Verne prize.

His first works were written in collaboration with Javier Redal. These are histories influenced by hard science fiction, set in the universe of Akasa-Puspa, although the time gaps between them make the similarities harder to find. These worlds are created with great consistency and attention to detail. Mundos en el Abismo (Worlds in the Abyss) and its sequel Hijos de la Eternidad (Children of Eternity) combine a plot typical of space opera with elements of hard science fiction.

El Refugio (The Refuge) shows a deep scientific influence: biotechnology, biochemistry, communication between species, evolution.

Aguilera has also collaborated with Ricardo Lázaro and Rafael Marín.

In his solo work, he spends less time on scientific detail and incorporates elements of fantasy, in a genre he calls "speculative history." As a scriptwriter, he has worked on the film Stranded: Náufragos. He has been the illustrator for a number of science fiction book covers.

== Bibliography ==
Works with Javier Redal

Short stories
Sangrando correctamente (1981)
Ari, el tonto (1992)
Maleficio (1995)

Novels
Mundos en el abismo (1988)
Hijos de la eternidad (1990)
En un vacío insondable (1994)
El refugio (1994)

Works with Ricardo Lázaro

Short stories
La llavor del mal (1996)

Works with Rafael Marín

Novels
Contra el tiempo (2001)

Solo work

Short stories
El bosque de hielo (1995)
Semilla (1998)

Novels
La locura de Dios (1998)
Rihla (2003)
Mundos y demonios (2005).
