= Premio Ignotus =

Spanish literary award

Premios Ignotus are annual Spanish literary awards that were created in 1991 by the Asociación Española de Fantasía, Ciencia Ficción y Terror (AEFCFT, translation: Spanish Association of Fantasy, Science Fiction and Horror). The process for the awards is similar to Hugo Awards. The awards, which are in the genres of science fiction and fantasy, are voted on by members of HispaCon, the national science fiction convention of Spain.

== Award winners by category ==
=== Category: Novel ===
Year	Author(s)	Title	Ref.
2026	Laura S. Maquilón	Fuga En Luz Mayor	
2025	Marina Tena Tena	La Novia Roja	
2024	Lola Llatas	El lugar invisible	
2023	Ines Galiano	Proyecto Kétchup	
2022	Marina Tena Tena	Brujas de arena	
2021	Sergio S. Morán	Se vende alma (por no poder atender)	
2020	Diana P. Morales	Voces en la ribera del mundo	
2019	Cristina Jurado	Bionautas	
2018	Jesús Cañadas	Las tres muertes de Fermín Salvochea	
2017	Guillem López	La polilla en la casa del humo	
2016	Guillem López	Challenger	
2015	Félix J. Palma	El mapa del caos	
2014	Eduardo Vaquerizo	Memoria de tinieblas	
2013	Félix J. Palma	El mapa del cielo	
2012	Rodolfo Martínez	Fieramente humano	
2011	Victor Conde	Crónicas del multiverso	
2010	Eduardo Vaquerizo	Última noche de Hipatia	
2009	David Jasso	Día de Perros	
2008	Javier Negrete	Alejandro Magno y las Águilas de Roma	
2007	Rafael Marín	Juglar	
2006	Eduardo Vaquerizo	Danza de tinieblas	
2005	Rodolfo Martínez	El sueño del rey rojo	
2004	Javier Negrete	La espada de fuego	
2003	Carlos F. Castrosín	Cinco días antes	
2002	Gabriel Bermúdez Castillo	Demonios en el cielo	
2001	José Antonio Suárez	Nuxlum	
2000	Rodolfo Martínez	El Abismo te devuelve la mirada	
1999	Juan Miguel Aguilera	La locura de Dios	
1998	Javier Negrete	La mirada de las furias	
1997	Rodolfo Martínez	Tierra de nadie: Jormungand	
1996	Rodolfo Martínez	La sonrisa del gato	
1995	Juan Miguel Aguilera y Javier Redal	El refugio	
1994	Gabriel Bermúdez Castillo	Salud mortal	
1993	N/A	No award	
1992	Tim Powers	La fuerza de su mirada	
1991	Dan Simmons	Hyperión	

=== Category: Anthology ===
Year	Editor(s)	Title	Ref.
2026	VV. AA.	Adviwnto Fantàstico 2025	
2025	VV. AA	Salir del Camino	
2024	Amparo Montejano	Tierra de Meigas	
2023	Marcheto	Cuentos para Algernon	
2022	Marcheto	Cuentos para Algernon: Año IX	
2021	Marcheto	Cuentos para Algernon: Año VIII	
2020	Marcheto	Cuentos para Algernon: Año VII	
2019	Rocío Vega	La compañía amable	
2018	Ken Liu	The Paper Menagerie (El zoo de papel)	
2017	Felicidad Martínez	La mirada extraña	
2016	Mariano Villarreal	A la deriva en el marde las lluvias	
2015	Mariano Villarreal	Terra Nova 3	
2014	Mariano Villarreal & Luis Pestarini	Terra Nova Vol. 2	
2010	Juan Jacinto Muñoz Rengel	De mecánica y alquimia	
2009	Santiago Eximeno	Bebés jugando con cuchillos	
2008	VV. AA	Premio UPC 2006	
2003	Andrzej Sapkowski	El último deseo	

=== Category: Foreign Novel ===
Year	Author(s)	Title	Ref.
2026	T. Kingfisher	What Feasts at Night	
2025	T. Kingfisher	What Moves the Dead	
2024	Stephen Graham Jones	My Heart Is a Chainsaw	
2023	Tamsyn Muir	Nona the Ninth	
2022	Tamsyn Muir	Gideon the Ninth	
2021	Becky Chambers	A Closed and Common Orbit	
2020	Kameron Hurley	The Light Brigade (La brigada de luz)	
2019	Becky Chambers	The Long Way to a Small, Angry Planet (El largo viaje a un pequeño planeta iracundo)	
2018	Kameron Hurley	The Stars Are Legion (Las estrellas son legión)	
2017	Liu Cixin	The Three Body Problem (El problema de los tres cuerpos)	
2016	Claire North	The First Fifteen Lives of Harry August	
2015	Andy Weir	The Martian (El Marciano)	
2014	China Miéville	Embassytown	
2013	China Miéville	The City & the City (La ciudad y la ciudad)	
2012	Paolo Bacigalupi	The Windup Girl (La chica mecánica)	
2012	Haruki Murakami	1Q84	
2011	Terry Pratchett	Nation	
2010	Greg Egan	Diaspora	
2009	Michael Chabon	The Yiddish Policemen's Union	
2008	Cormac McCarthy	The Road	
2007	Richard Morgan	Market Forces	
2006	George R. R. Martin	A Storm of Swords	
2005	Andreas Eschbach	The Carpet Makers	
2004	George R. R. Martin	A Clash of Kings	
2003	George R. R. Martin	A Game of Thrones	
2002	China Miéville	Perdido Street Station	
2001	Neal Stephenson	Snow Crash	
2000	Connie Willis	To Say Nothing of the Dog	
1999	Joe Haldeman	Forever Peace	
1998	Kim Stanley Robinson	Green Mars	
1997	Kim Stanley Robinson	Red Mars	
1996	Greg Bear	Moving Mars	
1995	Connie Willis	Doomsday Book	
1994	Hal Clement	Mission of Gravity	
1992	Tim Powers	The Stress of Her Regard	
1991	Dan Simmons	Hyperion	

=== Category: Foreign Short Story ===
Year	Author(s)	Title	Ref.
2026	Amal El-Mohtar	The River Has Roots	
2025	Alix E. Harrow	The Six Deaths of the Saint	
2024	Angela Slatter	Widow’s Walk	
2023	Alix E. Harrow	The long way up	
2022	Alix E. Harrow	Mr Death	
2021	Ted Chiang	Exhalation	
2020	Martha Wells	All Systems Red (Sistemas críticos)	
2019	Nnedi Okorafor	Binti	
2018	Aliette de Bodard	Three Cups of Grief, by Starlight	
2017	Ken Liu	The Bookmaking Habits of Select Species	
2016	Ken Liu	Algoritmos para el amor	
2015	Paolo Bacigalupi	El jugador	
2014	Ken Liu	The Man Who Ended History: A Documentary	
2013	Ken Liu	The Paper Menagerie	
2012	Iain M. Banks	The State of the Art (Última Generación)	
2011	Greg Egan	Luminous (Luminoso)	
2010	John Kessel	The Invisible Empire	
2009	J. G. Ballard	The Index	
2008	Vernor Vinge	The Cookie Monster	
2007	Greg Egan	Learning to Be Me (Aprendiendo a ser yo)	
2006	Mike Resnick	Down Memory Lane (El sumidero de la memoria)	
2005	George R. R. Martin	Path of the Dragon (Camino de Dragón)	
2004	George R. R. Martin	The Ice Dragon (El dragón de hielo)	
2003	Andrzej Sapkowski	Los musicos	
2002	Mike Resnick	The 43 Antarean Dynasties (Las 43 dinastías de Antares)	
2001	Robert Silverberg	Enter a Soldier. Later: Enter Another (Entra un soldado, despus otro)	
2000	Connie Willis	Chance (Azar)	
2000	Connie Willis	Nonstop to Portales (Directos a Portales)	
1999	Connie Willis	Why the World Didn't End Last Tuesday (Por qué el mundo no acabó el martes pasado)	
1998	Carlos Gardini	Timbuctú	
1997	Connie Willis	Even the Queen (Incluso la reina)	
1996	Mike Resnick	Seven Views of Olduvai Gorge (Siete vistas de la garganta Olduvai)	
1995	Alan Dean Foster	Our Lady of the Machine (Nuestra Señora de la Máquina)	
1994	Orson Scott Card	Ender's Game (El juego de Ender)	
