= Óscar Esquivias =

Spanish writer and poet

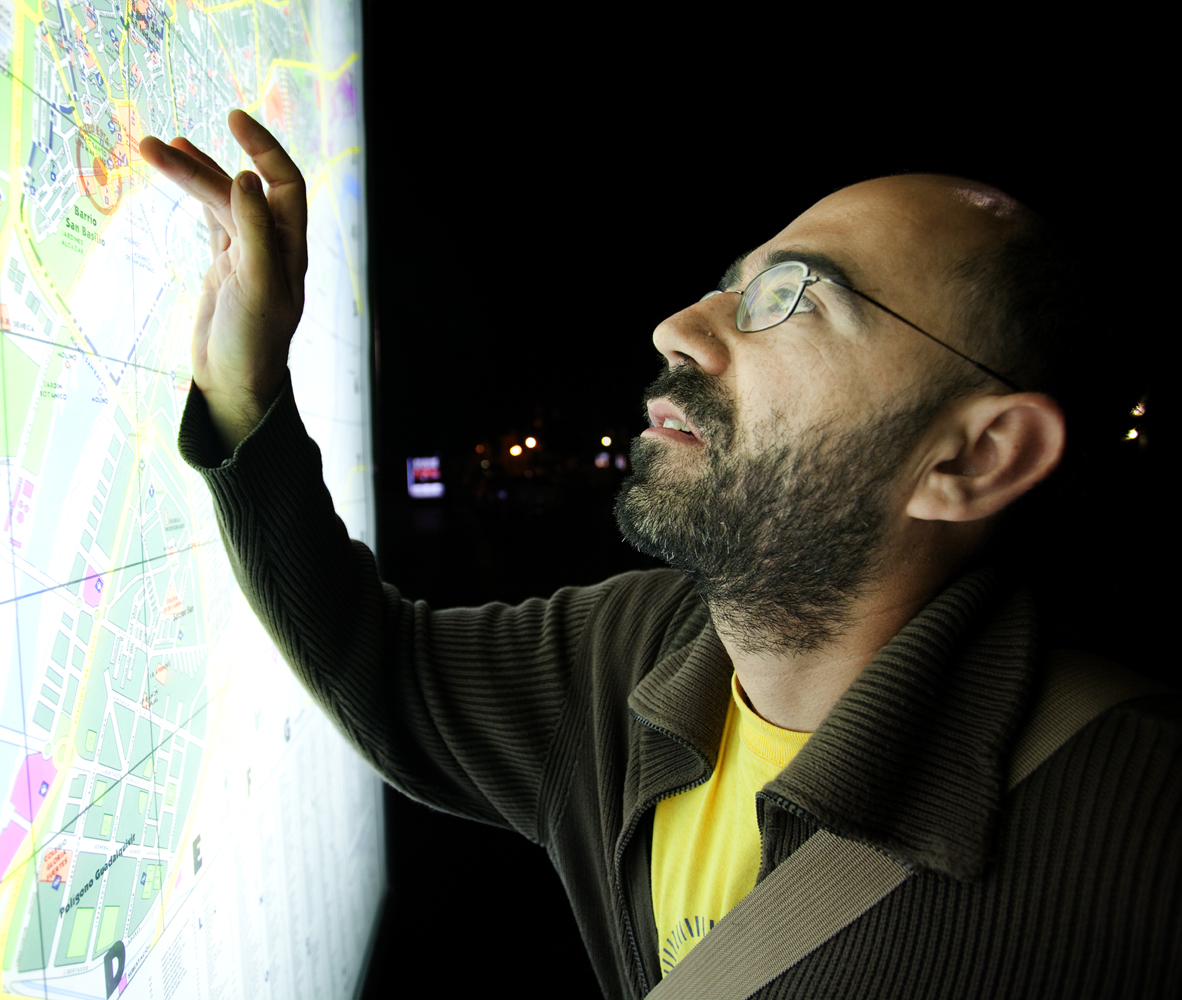
- Esquivias in Cordova, 2010
- Born: 28 June 1972 (age 54); Burgos, Spain
- Occupations: Short story writer, novelist.
- Writing career
- Period: 2000–present
- Genres: Novel, story, poetry, short story, very short fiction
- Notable works: Trilogy: Restlessness in Paradise, The City of the Great King and Comes the Night
- Notable awards: Ateneo Joven of Seville, Setenil
- Literary movement: Flash fiction, Alternate history, Gay literature
- Website: oscaresquivias.com

Óscar Esquivias (born 28 June 1972 in Burgos, Castile and León, Spain) is a Spanish short-story writer, poet and novelist.

== Biography ==
He studied at the University of Burgos. He was director of the literature magazine Calamar, revista de creación (1999-2002). His first novel, El suelo bendito (Award Ateneo Joven of Seville) was published in 2000. The trilogy of novels composed of Inquietud en el Paraíso (2005), La ciudad del Gran Rey (2006) and Viene la noche (2007) shows his personal vision of Dante's Divine Comedy.

He published a collection of short stories, Pampanitos verdes, many of which contained homosexual characters and themes.

He is currently a member of the Academy of Fine Arts and History 'Institución Fernán González'.

In December 2022, together with the photographer Asís G. Ayerbe, he founded the magazine Mirlo, dedicated to photography and literature.

== Works ==
=== Novels ===
- Étienne el Traidor (2008)
- Viene la noche (2007)
- Mi hermano Étienne (2007)
- La ciudad del Gran Rey (2006)
- Inquietud en el Paraíso (2005)
- Huye de mí, rubio (2002)
- Jerjes conquista el mar (2009) [first edition: Madrid, Visor, 2001]
- El suelo bendito (2000)

=== Novelettes ===
- El arpa eólica (in Steampunk : antología retrofuturista, 2011)

=== Collected short stories ===
- Pampanitos verdes (2010)
- La marca de Creta (2008)
- Andarás perdido por el mundo (2016).
- El chico de las flores (algunos cuentos favoritos). Valladolid: Junta de Castilla y León-Fundación Jorge Guillén, 2019 [Personal anthology of short stories].
- Alguien se despierta a medianoche (el libro de los profetas). Pictures: Miguel Navia. Madrid: Reino de Cordelia, 2022.

== Prizes and Rewards ==
- 2011: Award “La tormenta en un vaso” to the best book written in Spanish in 2010.
- 2008: Award “Setenil” of short stories.
- 2006: Award of the Critic of Castile and León.
- 2003: Mention in the “White Ravens” catalogue of the Internationale Jugend Bibliothek of Munich.
- 2000: Award “Arte Joven de novela” of the Community of Madrid.
- 2000: Award “Ateneo Joven” of Seville for Novel.
- 1990, 1995 y 1997 - Award Letras Jóvenes of Castile and León.
