= Mirlo, magazine =

Spanish monthly magazine

Mirlo
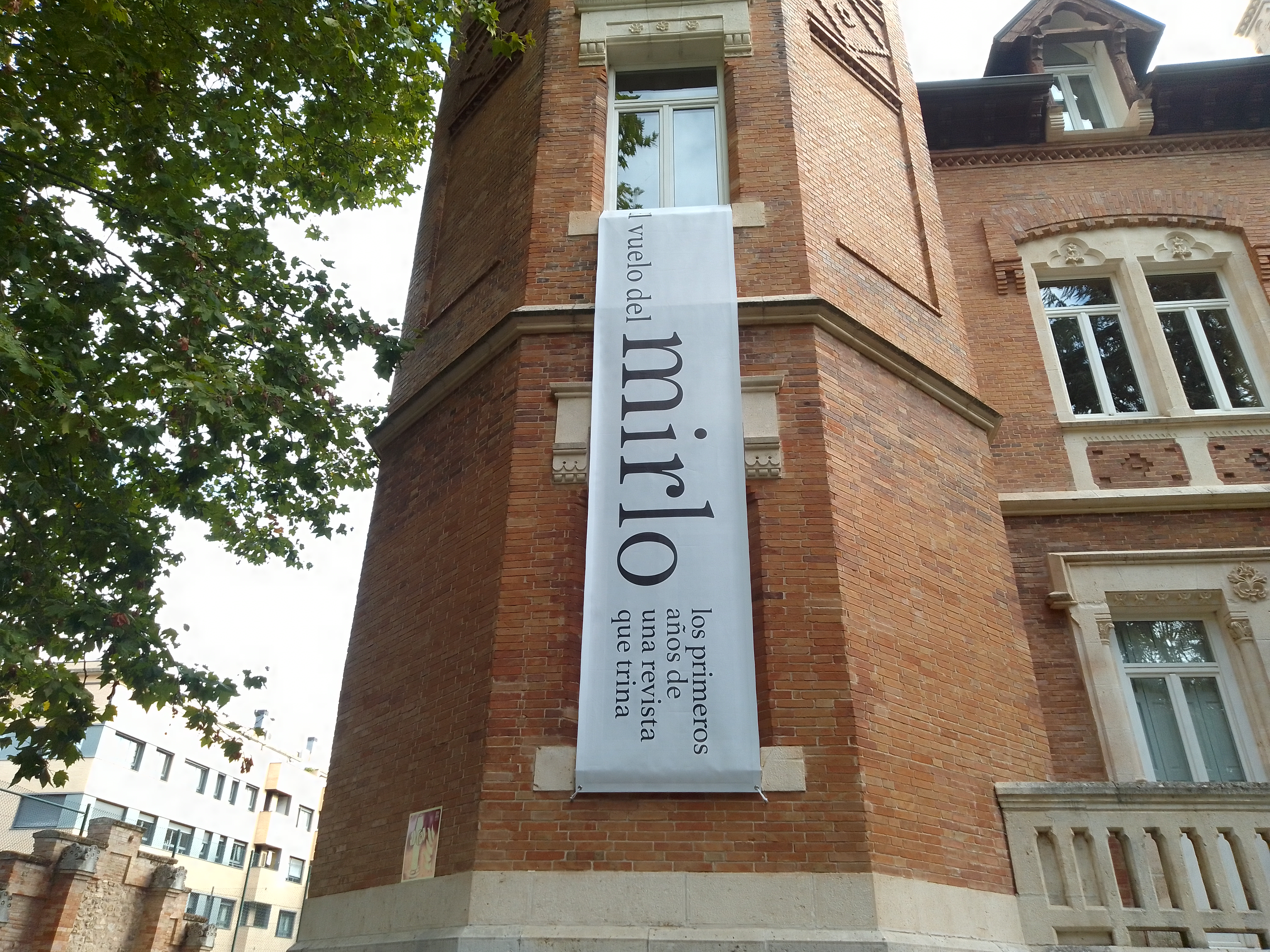
- Frequency: Monthly
- Founder: Asís G. Ayerbe and Óscar Esquivias
- Founded: December 2022
- Country: Spain
- Language: Spanish
- Website: www.revistamirlo.com
- ISSN: 2952-444X

Mirlo, subtitled la revista que trina (the magazine that twitters), is a Spanish monthly publication founded in 2022, specializing in photography, literature, and music. Characterized by experimentation, each issue develops a monographic theme and features a different design. It was founded by photographer and designer Asís G. Ayerbe and writer Óscar Esquivias, both of whom had previously created other publications during their university years in Burgos.

== Title ==
According to its editors, the name comes from the bird with one of the most beautiful and recognizable songs, the photogenic blackbird (turdus merula), the bird that announces the end of winter, that grows drunk on its own trilling and "goes mad with love", as Juan Ramón Jiménez once wrote.

== Characteristics ==
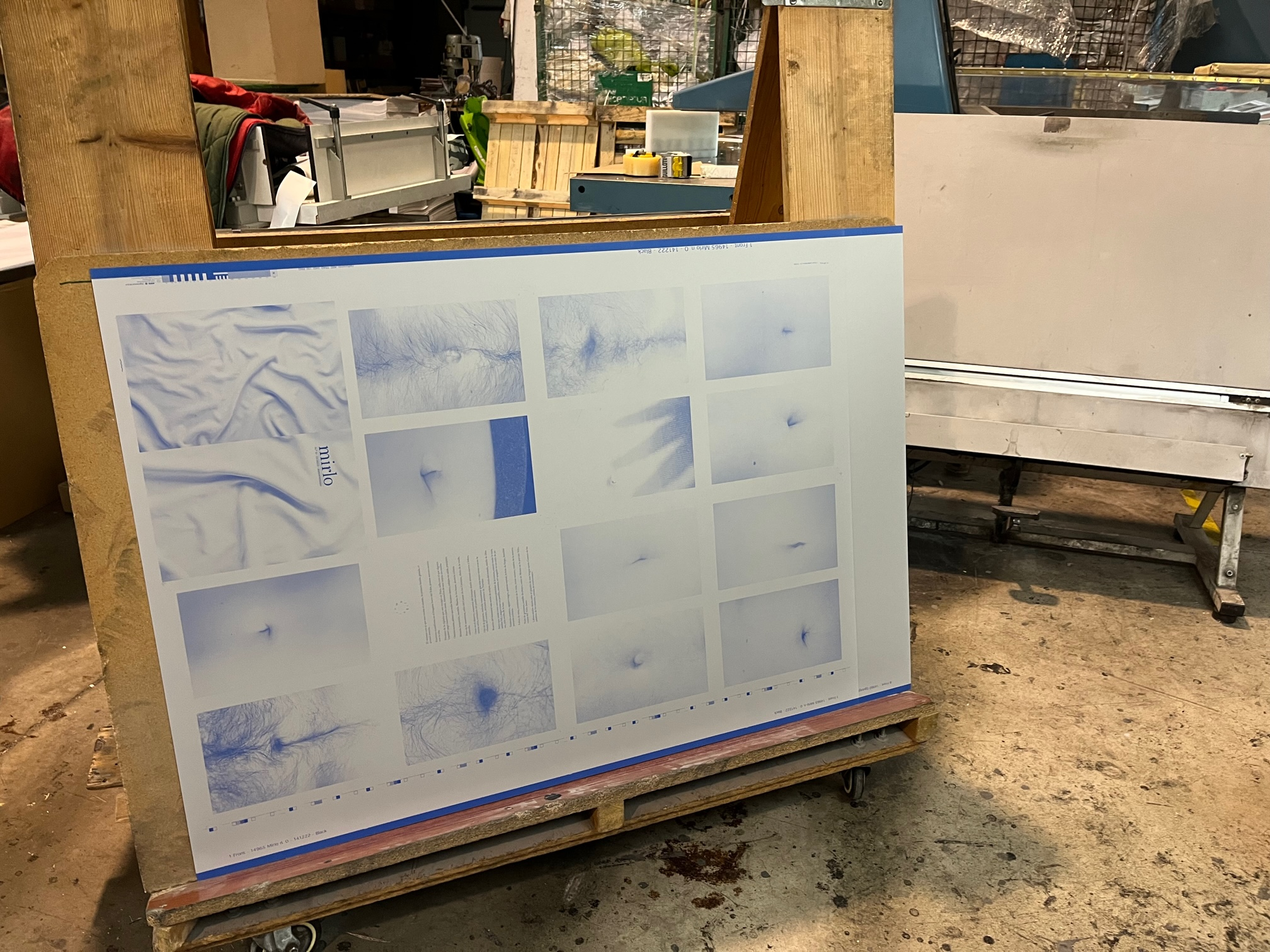
Printing process of issue no. 0 of Mirlo

Mirlo publishes thematic issues in which a creative concept is explored visually, literarily, and — from issue no. 20 onward — musically. It is known for its literary and visual variety and for producing experimental issues. Its issue no. 0, Autorretrato (Self-portrait), published in December 2022, consisted of a collection of navel self-portraits by fiction writers and poets. Other examples of experimental issues include no. 10, Brumario, printed in white ink on black paper; Armas de luz (no. 14, February 2024), printed in reflective ink on white paper and readable only in darkness; and no. 25, Viaje de estudios, shaped like a postcard book: the volume can be disassembled so that the cards can actually be mailed.

Photographic contributors to various issues include Jorge Otero (who designed the "Cámara Mirlo" for issue no. 23), Ángel Herraiz, Lola García Garrido, Nuria Mendoza, Carmen Ballvé, Chiara Boccardi, and Iosune de Goñi.

In addition to literary texts and photographs, Mirlo has also published illustrations by Alfonso Zapico and Luis Eguílaz.

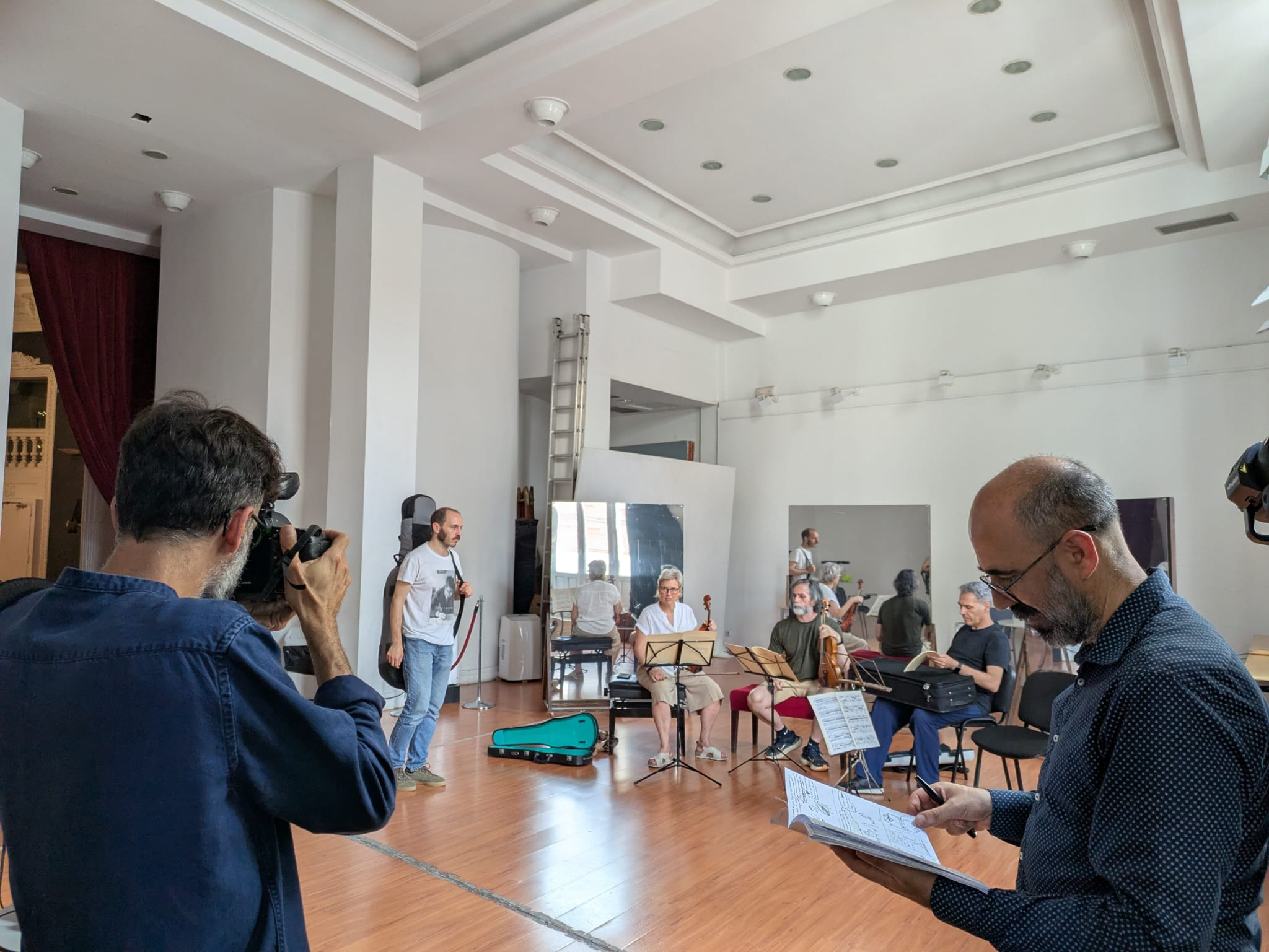
Photo shoot for issue no. 29 Harold! (Teatro Alcázar, Madrid, 2025)

== Music ==
Sheet music by Rafael Eguílaz has been published in the magazine, along with links to musical works composed specifically for the publication by Rafael Eguílaz, Carlos Hernández Sánchez, Adrián Graumann, and José Manrique.

== Exhibitions ==
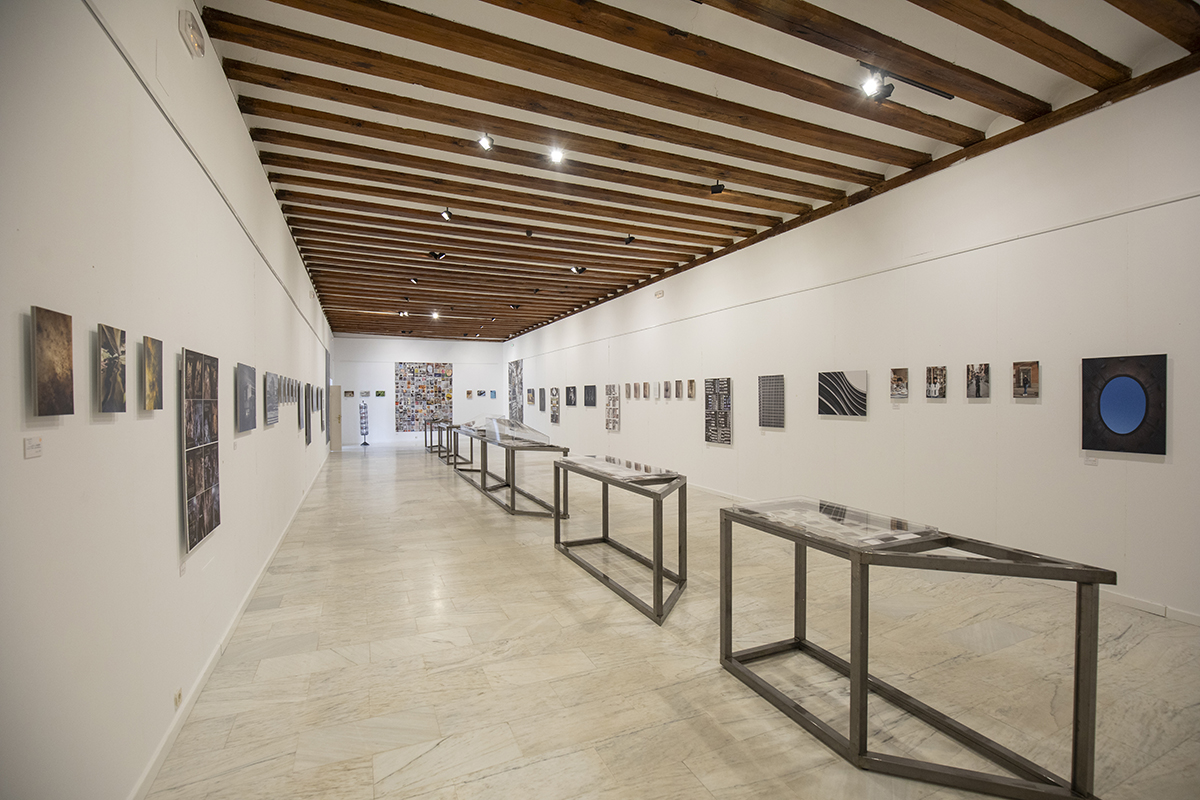
Partial view of the exhibition El vuelo del Mirlo (The Flight of the Blackbird) in the Hospital of San Agustín in El Burgo de Osma (2025)

In 2024, the Instituto de la Lengua de Castilla y León organized El vuelo del mirlo, los primeros años de una revista que trina ("The blackbird's flight: the early years of a tweeting magazine"), a retrospective exhibition on Mirlo. It opened at the Palacio de la Isla (Burgos) and featured photographs, texts, scores, drawings, manuscripts, cameras, and other technical elements illustrating the creative and printing process behind the magazine's various issues. The exhibition subsequently toured other locations in the region, including El Burgo de Osma and Aranda de Duero.

In September 2025, the exhibition ''Turba'' opened in Madrid, featuring photographs by Asís G. Ayerbe published in the magazine's eponymous issue (no. 33, September 2025).
