= Nocte Award =

Spanish literary award

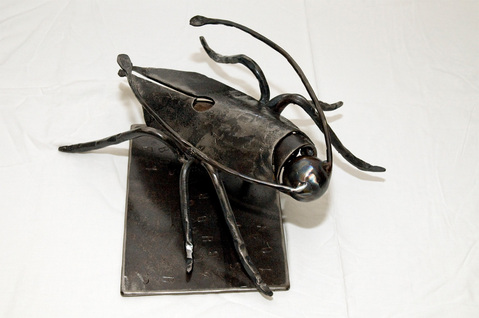
2009 Nocte Award

The Nocte Award is a Spanish literary award presented by the now-defunct Nocte (Spanish Horror Writers Association) to those books worthy of mention published in Spain in the previous year, and also for initiatives and careers associated with horror literature.

== Nocte ==
Nocte was a horror literary organization.

== 2011 Nocte Awards ==
- Best Spanish short story: “El hombre revenido” by Emilio Bueso (Aquelarre; Salto de Página).
- Best Spanish novel: Y pese a todo by Juande Garduño (Dolmen).
- Best foreign novel: El circo de la familia Pilo by Will Elliott (La Factoría).
- Honourable mention: Pablo Mazo, Antonio Rómar and Salto de Página for Aquelarre project.

== 2010 Nocte Awards ==
- Best Spanish short story: “El laberinto de la araña” by José Miguel Vilar-Bou (Cuentos inhumanos; Saco de huesos).
- Best Spanish novel: Fin by David Monteagudo (Editorial Acantilado).
- Best foreign short story: “La foto de la clase de este año” by Dan Simmons (Zombies; Minotauro).
- Best foreign novel: Una oración por los que mueren by Stewart O'Nan (La Factoría).

== 2009 Nocte Awards ==
- Best Spanish short story: “Lluvia sangrienta” by Roberto Malo. (La luz del diablo; Mira editores).
- Best foreign short story: “El mejor cuento de terror” by Joe Hill (Fantasmas; Suma).
- Best Spanish novel: Rojo alma, negro sombra by Ismael Martínez Biurrun (451 editores).
- Best foreign novel: Déjame entrar by John Ajvide Lindqvist (Espasa-Calpe).
- Honourable mention: Francisco Torres Oliver, for his translation career.
