= Care Santos =

Spanish writer

- Macarena Santos i Torres
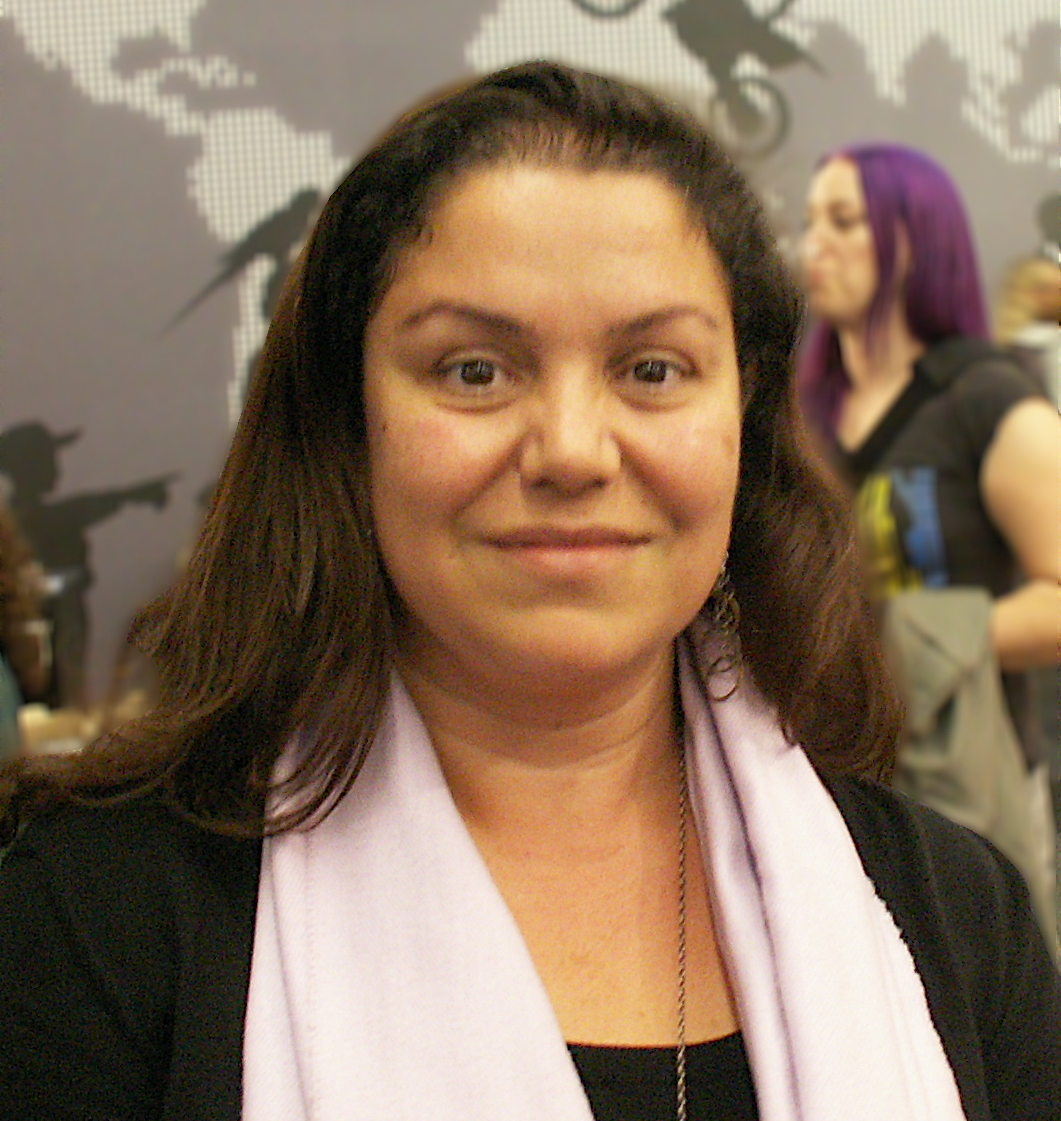
- Born: 8 April 1970 (age 56)
- Education: University of Barcelona
- Writing career
- Language: Catalan, Spanish
- Genre: novel
- Notable awards: Carmen Conde Award (2007); Premi de les Lletres Catalanes Ramon Llull Award (2014)

Macarena Santos i Torres (born 8 April 1970) is a Spanish writer who writes under the name "Care Santos". She writes in both Catalan and Spanish languages, for both young and adult readers.

== Biography ==
Care Santos studied law and Spanish in france philology at the University of Barcelona. She started her career as a journalist at Diari de Barcelona and later worked for the papers ABC and El Mundo. In 1995, Santos was recognized for her first book, a collection of novels with the title Cuentos cítricos. Her next books were Trigal con cuervos and Los ojos del lobo.

She has written for magazines such as Mirlo. She has performed literary criticism for El Cultural. She founded the blog La tormenta en un vaso.

== Awards and honors ==
- In 2007, her book Dissection received the Carmen Conde Women's Poetry Award,
- She was nominated for a Primavera de Novela Award for La muerte de Venus. The latter book was translated into several languages.
- In 2013, she won the Joaquim Ruyra Award for best youth book for her work No em preguntis qui. sóc.
- On 20 January 2014, Care Santos was awarded the Premi de les Lletres Catalanes Ramon Llull Award for the book Desig de xocolata, which was released on 6 March 2014.
- In 2017, she was awarded the Premio Nadal.

== Selected works ==
- El tango del perdedor (1997)
- Trigal con cuervos (1999)
- Aprender a huir (2000)
- La muerte de Kurt Cobain (1997)
- Okupada (1997)
- Te diré quién eres (1997)
- La ruta del huracán (1999)
- Krysis (2001)
- Operación Virgo (2002)
- Laluna.com (2003)
- Los ojos del lobo (2004)
- El circuito de Montecarlo (2005)
- El anillo de Irina (2005)
- El dueño de las sombras (2006)
- La muerte de Venus (2007)
- Habitaciones cerradas (2012) ISBN 9788408003816, OCLC 883890059

=== Works in English ===
- Desire for chocolate, translator Julie Wark, Richmond, Surrey Alma Books, 2016. ISBN 9781846883941, OCLC 958058149
- Dissection, translator Lawrence Schimel, New York: A Midsummer Nights Press, 2014. ISBN 9781938334122, OCLC 890615140
