= Félix J. Palma =

Spanish writer

Félix José Palma Macías (Sanlúcar de Barrameda, 16 June 1968) is a Spanish writer.

Palma is best known for The Victorian trilogy: The Map of Time, The Map of the Sky, and The Map of Chaos. The Map of Time has been published in more than 30 countries. His inspirations as an author have predominantly come from Latin American or English-language authors, but he identifies Argentinian author Julio Cortázar as one of his strongest influences. He is a well-known writer in Spain.

Palma's latest book, The Map of Chaos, was published in Spanish on October 16, 2014. It became available in English on June 30, 2015.
