= No entren al 1408 =

No entren al 1408 - Tributo al Rey del Terror
- Author: Jorge Luis Cáceres
- Genre: Horror
- Publisher: La Biblioteca de Babel
- Publication date: 2013
- Publication place: Ecuador, 2013

No entren al 1408: Antología en español tributo a Stephen King (English: Do Not Enter Room 1408: A Spanish Anthology Tribute to Stephen King) is a collection of horror stories by 22 Spanish-language authors, which aims to pay tribute to the style of the horror master Stephen King. The book was edited by the Ecuadorian writer Jorge Luis Cáceres. These books entitled “No entren al 1408” (Don’t enter the 1408) and “King, tributo al rey del terror” (King, tribute to the king of terror, InterZona, Buenos Aires, 2015), have three editions: Ecuador, 2013; Mexico, 2014 and Argentina, 2015, and are written by 30 writers from: Chile, Cuba, Ecuador, Mexico, Argentina, Uruguay and Spain.

== Authors ==
- Jorge Luis Cáceres (Quito, 1982)
- Mariana Enríquez (Buenos Aires, 1973)
- Juan Terranova (Buenos Aires, 1975)
- Luciano Lamberti (Córdoba, 1978) (Only in Ecuador and México)
- Jorge Enrique Lage (Havana, 1979)
- Francisco Ortega (Victoria, 1974)
- Abdón Ubidia (Quito, 1944) (Only in Ecuador and México)
- Eduardo Varas (Guayaquil, 1979) (Only in Ecuador and México)
- Patricia Esteban Erlés (Zaragoza, 1972)
- David Roas (Barcelona, 1965)
- Santiago Eximeno (Madrid, 1973) (Only in Ecuador and México)
- Paula Lapido (Madrid, 1975) (Only in Ecuador and México)
- Sergi Bellver (Barcelona, 1971) (Only in Ecuador and México)
- Juan Soto Ivars (Águilas, 1985)(Only in Ecuador and México)
- Marina Perezagua (Sevilla, 1978)
- Alberto Chimal (Toluca, 1970)
- Cecilia Eudave (Guadalajara, 1968) (Only in Ecuador and México)
- Antonio Ortuño (Guadalajara, 1976)
- Gabriel Rimachi Sialer (Lima, 1974) (Only in Ecuador)
- Carlos Calderón Fajardo (Juliaca, 1946) (Only in Ecuador)
- Rodolfo Santullo (Uruguay-México, 1979) (Only in Ecuador and México)
- Javier Calvo (Barcelona, 1973)
- Carlos Yushimito (Lima, 1977) (Only in México)
- Alexis Iparraguirre (Lima, 1974)
- Santiago Roncagliolo (Lima, 1975) (Only in Argentina)
- Edmundo Paz Soldán (Cochabamba, 1967) (Only in Argentina)
- Nico Saraintaris (Argentina, 1983) (Only in Argentina)
- Ariel Idez (Buenos Aires, 1977) (Only in Argentina)
- Espido Freire (Bilbao, 1974) (Only in Argentina)
- Solange Rodríguez Pappe (Guayaquil, 1976) (Only in Ecuador)
