= Setenil Award =

Spanish literary award

- Awarded for: Best short story book
- Sponsored by: Molina de Segura
- Country: Spain
- First award: 2004
- Website: Official website

The Setenil Award (Spanish: Premio Setenil) is a literary prize for the best short story book published in Spain. Convened annually since 2004 by the municipality of Molina de Segura in Murcia, it is one of the most prestigious in the country. As of 2018 it confers an economic endowment of €10,000, and the city council publishes a reprint of the winning work.

Each winner has a bench dedicated to him or her with a plaque in Molina de Segura's Paseo de Rosales.

In its 12th edition (2015), a micro-story book, written by Emilio Gavilanes, was awarded for the first time in the history of the contest. This recognized the strength and prestige of the microfiction genre.

== Winners ==
- Alberto Méndez (2004)
- Juan Pedro Aparicio (2005)
- Cristina Fernández Cubas (2006)
- Sergi Pàmies (2007)
- Óscar Esquivias (2008)
- Fernando Clemot (2009)
- Francisco López Serrano (2010)
- David Roas (2011)
- Clara Obligado (2012)
- Ignacio Ferrando (2013)
- Javier Sáez de Ibarra (2014)
- Emilio Gavilanes (2015)
- Diego Sánchez Aguilar (2016)
- Pedro Ugarte (2017)
- José Ovejero (2018)

== Editions ==
Edition	Year	Winning work	Author	Finalists	Jury	Ref.
1st	2004	The Blind Sunflowers	Alberto Méndez		Juan Manuel de Prada, Ana Luisa Baquero Escudero, Ramón Jiménez Madrid	
2nd	2005	La vida en blanco	Juan Pedro Aparicio		Luis Mateo Díez, Santos Sanz Villanueva, Manuel Martínez Arnaldos, Manuel Moyano	
3rd	2006	Parientes pobres del diablo	Cristina Fernández Cubas	Los últimos percances by Hipólito G. Navarro, Bar de anarquistas by José María Conget, El peso en gramos de los colibríes by Gonzalo Calcedo, Tantos ángeles rotos by Miguel Sánchez Robles, Los caballos azules by Ricardo Menéndez Salmón, El río by Emilio Gavilanes, Cuentos del libro de la noche by José María Merino, Dirección noche by Cristina Grandes, Helarte de amar by Fernando Iwasaki	Luis Alberto de Cuenca, Fernando Valls, Ramón Jiménez Madrid, Manuel Moyano	
4th	2007	Si menges una llimona sense fer ganyotes	Sergi Pàmies	Sin ti. Cuatro miradas desde la ausencia by Mara Torres, Tráeme las pilas cuando vengas by Pepe Monteserín, Alumbramiento by Andrés Neuman, La sombra del caimán by Manuel Moyano, La mujer sin memoria by Silvia Sánchez Rog	Ana María Matute, José María Jiménez Cano, José Belmonte Serrano, Manuel Moyano	
5th	2008	La marca de Creta	Óscar Esquivias	Mil cretinos by Quim Monzó, Voces de humo by Pablo Andrés Escapa, El rombo de Michaelis by Fernando Royuela, Temporada de huracanes by Gonzalo Calcedo, Vida de perro by Juan José Flores, Besos de fogueo by Montero Glez, Manderley en venta by Patricia Esteban Erlés, Norteamérica profunda by Juan Carlos Márquez, Miedo me da by José Antonio Francés	José María Merino, Manuel Cifo, Ramón Jiménez Madrid, Manuel Moyano	
6th	2009	Estancos del Chiado	Fernando Clemot		Javier Tomeo (president), José María Pozuelo Yvancos, José Belmonte Serrano, Manuel Moyano	
7th	2010	Los hábitos del azar	Francisco López Serrano	Los hábitos del azar by Francisco López Serrano, Teoría de todo by Paula Lapido, Un koala en el armario by Ginés S. Cutillas, Atractores extraños by Javier Moreno, Fantasías animadas by Berta Marsé, El menor espectáculo del mundo by Félix J. Palma, Azul ruso by Patricia Esteban Erlés, De mecánica y alquimia by Juan Jacinto Muñoz Rengel, Bajo el influjo del cometa by Jon Bilbao, El mes más cruel by Pilar Adón	Andrés Neuman (president), María Dueñas, Ramón Jiménez Madrid, Manuel Moyano	
8th	2011	Distorsiones	David Roas	Los ojos de los peces by Rubén Abella, Vidas prometidas by Guillermo Busutil, Pasadizos by Juan Herrezuelo, Tanta pasión para nada by Julio Llamazares, Los pobres desgraciados hijos de perra by Carlos Marzal, El heladero de Brooklyn by Fernando Molero Campos, Los muertos, los vivos by Beatriz Olivenza, Ficcionarium by Fernando Palazuelos, Cuentos rusos by Francesc Serés	Fernando Iwasaki (president), Antonio Parra Sanz, Gontzal Díez, Manuel Moyano	
9th	2012	El libro de los viajes equivocados	Clara Obligado	El vigilante del fiordo by Fernando Aramburu, Conversación by Gonzalo Hidalgo Bayal, Los caníbales by Iván Humanes, Historias de un dios menguante by José Mateos, Hacerse el muerto by Andrés Neuman, El libro de los viajes equivocados by Clara Obligado, Calle Aristóteles by Jesús Ortega, Geometría del azar by Fernando Palazuelos, Habitaciones privadas by Cristina Peri Rossi, Esquina inferior del cuadro by Miguel Ángel Zapata	Cristina Fernández Cubas (president), Antonio Lucas, José María Pozuelo Yvancos	
10th	2013	La piel de los extraños	Ignacio Ferrando	La tristeza de las tiendas de pelucas by Patxi Irurzun, Aquí yacen dragones by Fernando León de Aranoa, Lazos de sangre by Lola López Mondéjar, Interior azul by Anna R. Ximenos, Las batallas silenciosas by Juana Cortés Amunarriz, Vae victis by Luis del Romero Sánchez-Cutillas, Vigilias efímeras by Sergio Coello, La soledad de los gregarios by Miguel Sánchez Robles, Polvo en los labios by Montero Glez	Juan Manuel de Prada, Ana Luisa Baquero Escudero, Ramón Jiménez Madrid, Manuel Moyano	
11th	2014	Bulevar	Javier Sáez de Ibarra	El hilo conductor by Elena Alonso Frayle, Crímenes ilustrados by Álvaro del Amo, Cada cual y lo extraño by Felipe Benítez Reyes, La desesperación del león y otras historias de la India by Sonia García Soubriet, Yo vi a Nick Drake by Eduardo Jordá, Todos los crímenes se cometen por amor by Luisgé Martín, Profundo Sur by Juan José Téllez, Técnicas de iluminación by Eloy Tizón, Te espero dentro by Pedro Zarraluki	Hipólito G. Navarro (president), Lola López Mondéjar, José Belmonte Serrano, Manuel Moyano	
12th	2015	Historia secreta del mundo	Emilio Gavilanes	Los viajes del prisionero by Rubén Díez Tocado, Solo con hielo by Silvia Fernández Díaz, Demasiada roca solitaria by Alberto García Salido, Caza mayor by Manuel Moya, Breviario negro by Ángel Olgoso, Ocho cuentos de azufre by Álvaro Pombo, Bienvenidos a Incaland by David Roas, La luz de Yosemite by Antonio J. Ruiz Munuera, Presupuesto sin compromiso by Ramón Santana González	Juan Bonilla (president), José María Pozuelo Yvancos, Manuel Martínez Arnaldos, Manuel Moyano	
13th	2016	Nuevas teorías sobre el orgasmo femenino	Diego Sánchez Aguilar	Cambios de última hora by Elena Alonso Frayle, Como meteoritos by Alejandro Amelivia, Relatos americanos by Saljo Bellver, Manual de autoayuda by Miguel Ángel Carmona del Barco, Signor Hoffman by Eduardo Halfon, Mala letra by Sara Mesa, Los amores equivocados by Cristina Peri Rossi, La chica de los ojos manga by José Antonio Sau, De este pan y de esta guerra by Jesús Zomeño	Eloy Tizón (president), José Belmonte Serrano, Antonio Parra Sanz	
14th	2017	Nuestra historia	Pedro Ugarte	Aprenderé a rezar para lograrlo by Víctor Balcells Matas, La condición animal by Valeria Correa Fiz, El mosquito de Nueva York by Daniel Díez Carpintero, Peces de charco by Ana Esteban, La vuelta al día by Hipólito G. Navarro, Teatro de sombras by Fermín López Costero, O by Alejandro Pedregosa, La acústica de los iglús by Almudena Sánchez, La mirada del orangután by Chelo Sierra	Pilar Adón (president), Carmen Valcárcel, Aurora Gil Bohórquez	
15th	2018	Mundo extraño	José Ovejero	Que la ciudad se acabe de pronto by Trifón Abad, La vida sumergida by Pilar Adón, El silencio y los crujidos by Jon Bilbao, Secretos de familia, Santiago Casero, Las madres secretas by Mónica Crespo, Estado de excepción by David Gallego, La sabiduría de quebrar huesos by Pablo Matilla, Un paseo por la desgracia ajena by Javier Moreno, Réplica by Miguel Serrano Larraz	Luisgé Martín (president), Manuel Moyano, Lola López Mondéjar, Basilio Pujante	
