= Patricia Esteban Erlés =

Spanish school teacher, journalist and short story writer

Patricia Esteban Erlés (born 1972, Zaragoza) is a Spanish secondary school teacher, journalist for the Heraldo de Aragón, and short story writer. She studied Spanish language and literature at the University of Zaragoza. Her work has received several literary awards and has been featured in multiple anthologies. Critics such as Rachel Rees have highlighted the “biting wit” of her short fiction.

== Works ==
=== Novel ===
- Las Madres Negras. Madrid: Galaxia Gutemberg, 2018. Winner of IV Premio Dos Passos (2017).

=== Short story collections ===
- Manderley en venta. Zaragoza: Tropo, 2008. Premio de Narrativa de la Universidad de Zaragoza (2007) and finalist for the Setenil Award (2008).
- Abierto para fantoches. Zaragoza: Diputación, 2008.
- Azul ruso. Madrid: Páginas de Espuma, 2010. Finalist for the Setenil Award (2010).
- Casa de muñecas. Ilustraciones: Sara Morante. Madrid: Páginas de Espuma, 2012.

=== Articles ===
- Fondo de armario. Editorial Contraseña SC, Zaragoza, 2019.

=== Anthologies ===
The short stories of Patricia Esteban have been included in the following anthologies:

- No entren al 1408 - Antología en español tributo a Stephen King. Ed. Jorge Luis Cáceres. Quito: La Biblioteca de Babel, 2013.
- Siglo XXI. Los nuevos nombres del cuento español actual. Ed. Gemma Pellicer & Fernando Valls. Palencia: Menoscuarto, 2010.
- El libro del voyeur. Pablo Gallo, ilustrador y editor. La Coruña: Ediciones del Viento, 2010.
- Perturbaciones. Antología del relato fantástico español actual. Ed. Juan Jacinto Muñoz Rengel. Madrid: Páginas de Espuma, 2009.
- Por favor, sea breve 2. Antología de relatos hiperbreves. Ed. Clara Obligado. Madrid: Páginas de Espuma, 2009.
- 22 escarabajos. Antología hispánica del cuento beatle. Ed. Mario Cuenca Sandoval. Madrid: Páginas de Espuma, 2009.
- Ellos y ellas. Relaciones de amor, lujuria y odio entre directores y estrellas. Ed. Hilario J. Rodríguez & Carlos Tejeda. Calamar Ediciones /Festival de Cine de Huesca, 2010. (Her story Alfred Hitchcock y las rubias, describes a fictitious conversation between Alfred Hitchcock & François Truffaut).
- Cuentos de Iberia: 19 cuentos, 15 lenguas. Ed. José López Camarillas. Llibres de l’Encobert, Valencia, 2018.

=== Translations into English ===
- Take Six: Six Spanish Women Writers, edited and translated by Kathryn Phillips-Miles and Simon Deefholts: Dedalus Books, 2022. (Contains a selection of Patricia’s stories in English translation).

=== Awards and Prizes ===
- Premio de Narración Breve de la Universidad de Zaragoza, 2007.
- XXII Premio de Narrativa Santa Isabel de Aragón, Reina de Portugal for Azul ruso.
- Premio Dos Passos for Las madres negras.
