= Juan Ortega =

Juan Ortega may refer to:

- Juan Ortega (bishop) (died 1503), Roman Catholic prelate
- Juan José Ortega (1904–1996), Mexican film director, producer and screenwriter
- Juan Cánovas Ortega (born 1961), Spanish short story writer and poet
- Juan Carlos Ortega (born 1967), Mexican football manager and former player
- Juan Ortega (field hockey), Italian field hockey player

== See also ==
- Juan Ortega y Montañés (1627–1708), Roman Catholic bishop and colonial administrator
- Juan de Ortega (disambiguation)
