= The Blind Sunflowers =

The Blind Sunflowers may refer to:

- The Blind Sunflowers (novel), a 2004 Spanish novel by Alberto Méndez
- The Blind Sunflowers (film), a 2008 Spanish film, based on the novel
