= Luciano Lamberti =

Argentine writer

Luciano Lamberti (San Francisco, Córdoba, 1978) is an Argentine writer.

He holds a bachelor's degree in modern literature from the National University of Córdoba in Argentina. He writes for local and national media, works as a high school language teacher, and leads the creative-writing workshop of the Provincial Neuropsychiatric Hospital in Córdoba.

== Works ==
Fiction

- Sueños de siesta. La Creciente, 2006.
- El asesino de chanchos. Tamarisco, 2010.
- Los campos magnéticos. Sofía Cartonera, 2012.
- El loro que podía adivinar el futuro. Nudista, 2012.
- La maestra rural. Random House, 2016.
- El asesino de chanchos. Marbot, 2017.
- Para hechizar un cazador. Alfaguara, 2025.

Poetry

- San Francisco Córdoba. Funesiana, 2008.

Selected anthologies

- Es lo que hay. Lilia Lardone, ed. Babel, 2008.
- 10 bajistas. Alejo Carbonell, ed. Eduvim, 2008.
- Ungrito de corazón. Damián Ríos, Mariano Blatt, eds. Mondadori, 2009.
- Autopista. Javier Mattio, Daniel Salzano, eds. Raíz de dos, 2010.
- Hablar de mí. Juan Terranova, ed. Lengua de Trapo.
- No entren al 1408. Jorge Luis Cáceres, Babel, 2013.
