= Tito Munoz =

Tito Munoz could refer to:

- Tito Muñoz (born 1983), an American classical music conductor
- Tito the Builder, a John McCain supporter in the 2008 US presidential election
- Tito Muñoz (writer) (born 1956), Spanish writer
