= Juan Soto (disambiguation) =

Juan Soto (born 1998) is a Dominican baseball player

Juan Soto may also refer to:

- Juan Soto (footballer, born 1937) (1937–2014), Chilean football forward and manager
- Juan Soto (footballer, born 1956), Chilean football midfielder
- Juan Soto (referee) (born 1977), Venezuelan football referee
- Juan Soto Ivars (born 1985), Spanish novelist and columnist
