= Tizón =

Tizón or Tizon is a surname. Notable people with the surname include:

- Alex Tizon (1959–2017), Filipino-American author and Pulitzer Prize-winning journalist
- Allan Wagner Tizón (born 1942), Peruvian diplomat, Minister of Foreign Affairs
- Arturo Tizón (1984–2021), Spanish motorcycle racer
- Aurelia Gabriela Tizón de Perón (1902–1938), Argentine educator, wife of former Argentine president Juan Perón
- Eloy Tizón (born 1964), Spanish writer
- Héctor Tizón (1929–2012), Argentine writer, journalist, lawyer, judge, and diplomat
- Jose Ramon Tizon Villarin, Filipino Jesuit priest and scientist
- Juan Tizón (1895–1945), Spanish politician and writer exiled during the Spanish Civil War
- Ventura Rodríguez Tizón (1717–1785), Spanish architect and artist

== See also ==
- Tizon, the name of one of the swords carried by Rodrigo Díaz de Vivar, El Cid
