= Mara Torres =

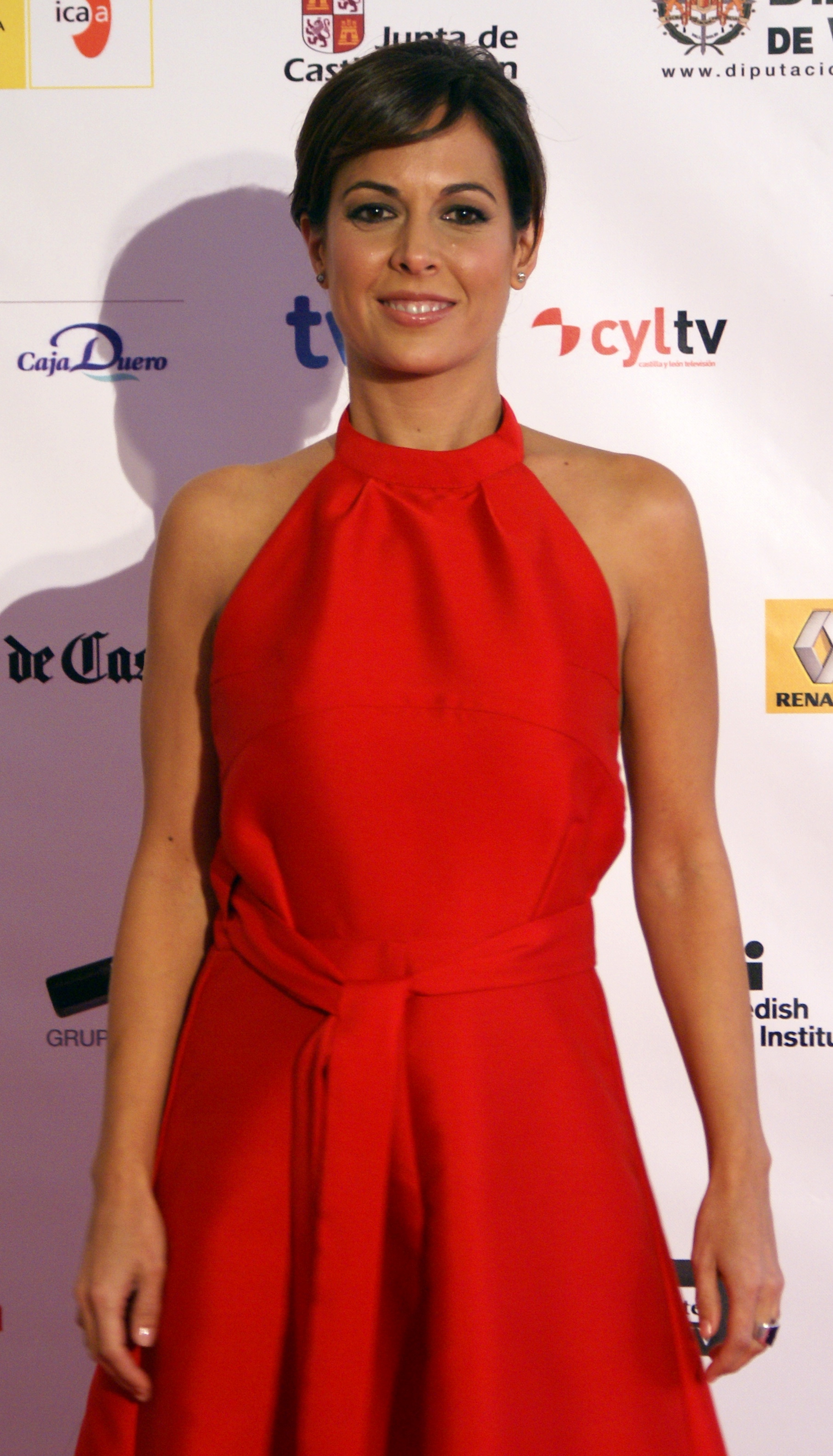
- Marra Torres in 2011
- Born: 25 September 1974 (age 51); Madrid, Spain
- Occupations: Journalist, writer, radio host, television host

Mara Torres (Madrid, 25 September 1974) is a Spanish journalist, author, and radio and television host.

== Background ==
Torres earned a journalism degree from the Complutense University of Madrid (UCM). In 2006 she completed her graduate and doctorate studies at the Department of Language and Literature. In 2008 she began studying Comparative Literature in the Faculty of Philology of UCM.

== Radio ==
In 1994 she directed a university program on the Onda Mini radio station and in 1995 entered the SER Network. She took part in the writing and production of the program Iñaki Gabilondo: Hoy por hoy, and the program Hola Madrid y La Gran Evasión for the local SER radio station.

From 1998 to 2001, she directed and hosted the talk show A contraluz and from then until the end of 2006, she also directed and hosted Hablar por hablar (on the SER Network), which was the early morning radio show leader, reaching more than 740,000 listeners.

== Television ==
In October 2006 she became part of the Spanish Television Information Services where she hosted the news show "La 2 Noticias"

Since September 2013 she has hosted Torres y Reyes alongside the comedian Joaquin Reyes on the "La 2" channel.

== Published books ==
- Hablar por hablar. Historias de madrugada
- Sin ti. Cuatro miradas desde la ausencia (Finalist at the 4th Setenil Award for the best book of short stories)
- La vida imaginaria (This novel was the Finalist of the Premio Planeta 2012)
- En marzo de 2014, Mara Torres obtiene el Premio e-Awards a la Personalidad del Año en internet.
- Los días felices (Planeta, 2017)
- Recuérdame bailando (Planeta, 2025)
