= Tito Muñoz (writer) =

Spanish writer (born 1956)

Tito Muñoz (born 1956) is a Spanish poet and lyricist. He was born in Barcelona. He has published some nine volumes of poetry, and his work has been praised by the likes of Luis García Montero, Felipe Benítez Reyes and Luis Alberto de Cuenca. As a lyricist, he has composed songs for Joan Manuel Serrat and Javier Ruibal among others.
