= Cecilia Eudave =

Mexican writer

- Born: April 11, 1968 (age 58); Guadalajara, Mexico
- Occupations: academic and writer

Academic background
- Education: University of Montpellier

Academic work
- Discipline: Mexican literature
- Institutions: University of Guadalajara
- Notable works: La criatura del espejo El enigma de la esfera Pesadillas al mediodía

Cecilia Eudave (Guadalajara, April 11, 1968) is a Mexican writer, researcher, and university professor.

She is the author of three novels: La criatura del espejo (2007), El enigma de la esfera (2008), and Pesadillas al mediodía (2010). She has also published over ten books of short stories. Some of her stories were translated into Japanese in the science fiction magazine Lunatic 23.

== Biography ==
She holds a PhD in romance languages from the University of Montpellier and has written articles for various cultural magazines in Mexico. In 1990, she was awarded the Salvador Novo National Scholarship for Narrative by the National Institute of Fine Arts and Literature, the College of Mexico and the Center of Mexican Writers. In 1997, she received a grant by the State Fund for Culture and Arts of Jalisco in the "Young Creator" category.

She currently works as a professor and researcher at the University of Guadalajara. Her research revolves around Mexican literature, fantasy literature and the analysis of cultural and visual texts, and she is the coordinator of the university's master's degree Program in Mexican literature. Her previous job as a teacher was in the Colegio Juana de Ibarbourou in her hometown Guadalajara.

== Selected works ==
=== Books ===
- Técnicamente humanos (cuentos, 1996, Ed. Del Plenilunio)
- Invenciones enfermas (cuentos, 1997, Ed. Del Plenilunio)
- Registro de Imposibles (cuentos, 2000. Fondo editorial Tierra Adentro; 2da. edición 2006 Ed. Del Plenilunio)
- Países Inexistentes (cuentos, 2004)
- Sirenas de Mercurio (cuentos, 2007, Ed. Amargord. Col.1003 libros para cruzar la noche, España)
- La criatura del espejo (Novela, 2007, Ed. Progreso)
- Bestiaria Vida (novela. 2008, Ed. Ficticia)
- El enigma de la esfera (novela, 2008, Ed. Progreso)
- Aproximaciones. Afinidades, reflexiones y análisis sobre textos culturales contemporáneos (ensayos, 2004, Universidad de Guadalajara)
- Las Batallas desiertas del pensamiento del 68. Acercamiento analítico a Ciudades desiertas de José Agustín (Análisis, 2007, Universidad de Guadalajara)
- Sobre lo fantástico mexicano (Ensayos, 2008, Ed. LetraRoja Publisher, USA).
- Técnicamente humanos y Otras historias extraviadas (Cuentos, 2010, Ed. LetraRoja Publisher, USA)
- Pesadillas al mediodía (Novela, 2010, Ed. Progreso)
- Papá Oso (Cuento infantil, 2010, Ed. A buen paso, Barcelona).

=== Stories published in short story collections ===
- Erótica (México,1997)
- Extremos, cuento último de Guadalajara (1998)
- Incontro con gli scrittorim messicani di oggi (Italia, 2002)
- Enciclopedia temática de Jalisco, sección creadores (tomo XIV, 1999), y en el Diccionario de escritoras en Guadalajara (2002)
- El libro monero. Crónica del birote y su arrimón a las letras (Comic. Guadalajara, 2004)
- La vuelta a Verne en 13 viajes ilustrados (Comic. 2005)
- Antología de cuento fantástico (2005)
- Seres de la noche (2006)
- El Arca. Bestiario y ficciones de 31 escritores hispanoamericanos (Chile, 2007 y Perú 2008)
- Un vagón de aventuras (Cuentos para niños, España, 2008).
- No entren al 1408 - Antología en español tributo a Stephen King (Edición Jorge Luis Cáceres)1 (La Biblioteca de Babel, Quito, 2013).

== Awards ==
- The Juan Garcia Ponce National Novel Award at the Yucatán Literature Biennial for her novel Bestiaria vida (2007)
- Honorable mention in the Alfonso Reyes National Poetry Competition and the Juan Rulfo National Short Story Contest.
- Honorable mention at the 12th Annual International Latino Book Awards for her book Sobre lo fantástico mexicano, at the BookExpo America, New York (2010).
