= Concurso Literario de La Felguera =

The Concurso Literario de La Felguera (La Felguera Literary Competition) or Premio Internacional de Relatos Cortos de La Felguera (La Felguera Short Stories International Award) is the most important tales competition of Spain and one of the most popular in Spanish language.

It was created in 1950 like a poems competition, until 1955, and since that year as a tales or short stories competition. It takes place in the town of La Felguera (Principality of Asturias, Spain). The award consists in the Llaves de San Pedro (Saint Peter Keys) and 8.000 €. Every year the San Pedro Cultural Society receives hundreds of stories from all around the world.

Awarded Stories
Year	Title	Author
1956	Los Jueves, cita con los fantasmas	Felipe Santullano
1957	Sólo casó de blanco a la pequeña	Ramón Zulaica
1958	Las tres hermanas	Luciano Castañón
1959	El trato	Mauro Muñiz
1960	El hombre del café	Eduardo G. Rico
1961	El vaso de agua	José Antonio Mases
1962	La vagoneta	Mauro Muñiz
1963	El buen amanecer	José Luis Prado Nogueira
1964	Acero	Venancio Ovies
1965	Un pedazo de vidrio de color verde	Carlos Murciano
1966	La alcoba, simplemente	José A. del Cañizo Perate
1967	El surco en la sonrisa	Fernando López Serrano
1968	Quisicosas de Don General	José Modellel Soriano
1969	La tonta	Justo Merino Belmonte
1970	González, retrato de un hombre	Pilar Nervión
1971	Detrás de un alihustre o un envónimo	Ángel Palomino
1972	Penúltimo invierno	Rodrigo Rubio
1973	La corta	Manuel Lozano Garrido
1974	Sombre este cadáver de ceniza	Luis Fernández Roces
1975	El último traje del Coronel	Anastasio Fernández Sanjosé
1976	Descenso a las quimeras	Juan Gómez Saavedra
1977	Materia de confesión	Alfonso Simón Pelegrí
1978	Aturuxo, el vikingo	Ramón Eiroa
1979	Guárdame los sellos	Pedro Quintanilla Buev
1980	Pequeña meditación	Elena Santiago
1981	Incidente en Atocha	José Ferrer Bermejo
1982	''Los encendios pámpanos	Carlos Sánchez Pinto
1983	ElValet de hojalata	Maximiliano Mariotti
1984	El hombre y el toro	Enrique Sánchez y Pascual
1985	Vuelo oculto	Salvador García Jiménez
1986	Quiliceros queridos	Jorge González Aranguren
1987	Voz sin eco	Gonzalo Martínez Simarro
1988	Nido	José Luis Carrasco
1989	La plaga	Migel Lizando Martínez
1990	Desencuentro al otro lado del tiempo	Luis Sepúlveda
1991	Seychelles	Ramón Muñoz-Chapulí
1992	Madre para amar	Inés Fernández Moreno
1993	Último silencio	Eugenio Fuentes Pulido
1994	El hombre que felicitóal presidente	José Antonio Illanes Fernández
1995	El hombre que perdió los números	José María Latorre Macarrón
1996	Rex Angelorum	Manuel Jurado López
1997	Fado impostor	Ignacio Cinto García
1998	Una cuestión personal	Pilar Navarrete Hernández
1999	El umbral	Marcelo Simonetti Ugarte
2000	El necrófil	Juan Cánovas Ortega
2001	Deutsches Requiem	Ricardo Gómez Gil
2002	Reencuentro	M. Francisco Rodríguez
2003	Los Habituales de la brioche	Juan Jacinto Muñoz Rengel
2004	Leningrado tiene setecientos puentes	Mar Sancho
2005	La tejedora de muertos	Rosa Gladys Ruiz de Azúa Aracama
2006	Al que Vd. quiera	José Javier Alfaro Calvo
2007	El escrúpulo místico	Miguel Sánchez Robles
2008	La sangre del violín	María Luisa del Romero
2009	El sueño del monstruo	Juan Jacinto Muñoz Rengel
2010	Aleluya	José Adolfo Muñoz Palancas
2011	Una moneda de cobre	Ángel Fernández
2012	El infinito y mucho más	Dolroes Marín
2013	Es pecado matar a un ruiseñor	María Isabel Andreu
2014	Not awarded	Not awarded

Awarded Poems
Year	Title	Author
1950	Exaltación al trabajo	V. Eugenio Hernández Vista
1951	Espíritu y laboriousidad de La Felguera	D. Jacinto Maestre
1952	Himno al trabajo	D. Lorenzo Guardiola Tomas
1953	Fervor de Asturias	Dña. Ángeles Villarta
1954	El Mensaje de las Cumbres	D. Joaquín A. Bonet
1955	Picos de Europa	D. Luis López Anglade
