= Alberto Méndez =

Spanish novelist (1941–2004)

- Born: Alberto Méndez Borra; August 27, 1941; Madrid, Spain
- Died: December 30, 2004 (aged 63); Madrid, Spain
- Education: Universidad Complutense de Madrid
- Occupation: Writer
- Notable work: Los girasoles ciegos
- Awards: Premio Nacional de Narrativa (2005); Premio de la Crítica de narrativa castellana (2005); Setenil Award (2004)

Alberto Méndez (August 27, 1941 – December 30, 2004) was a Spanish novelist. He graduated from the Universidad Complutense de Madrid, and worked in publishing. His novel Los girasoles ciegos won several awards, including the Sentenil Prize (2004), the Critics' Prize and the National Prize for Literature in 2005. It was translated into English by Nick Caistor under the title Blind Sunflowers. It was also made into a film called The Blind Sunflowers (2008).

== Biography ==
He was born and spent his childhood in Madrid, son of the translator and poet José Méndez Herrera. He studied baccalaureate in Rome (Italy) and graduated in Philosophy and Letters at the Complutense University of Madrid. He was affiliated in the Communist Party until 1982. He founded the publishing house Ciencia Nueva and collaborated in Montena and his distributor Les Punxes. In 2002 he was a finalist of the Max Aub International Story Award for one of the stories of The Blind Sunflowers.

Thanks to Los girasoles ciegos he won in 2004 the 1st Setenil Award for the best book of stories of the year. He was awarded posthumous title with the Premio Nacional de Narrativa in 2005 for Los girasoles ciegos, a book composed of four stories set in the Spanish Civil War. The work, published at the age of 63, also won the Premio de la Crítica. The last story of the book -the one that gives it its name- was taken to the cinema in 2008 by José Luis Cuerda, who also wrote the script along with Rafael Azcona, and it has the same name.

Although he did not dedicate himself to literature until his later years, Méndez worked closely with it. He was an editor at the publishers Les Punxes and Montena, among others, and co-founder in the 1960s of Ciencia Nueva, which was closed by Manuel Fraga in 1969. He collaborated on TVE dramatic plays and was a screenwriter with Pilar Miró.

He died of cancer in Madrid on December 30, 2004, and was cremated.
