= Pilar Adón =

Spanish writer and translator

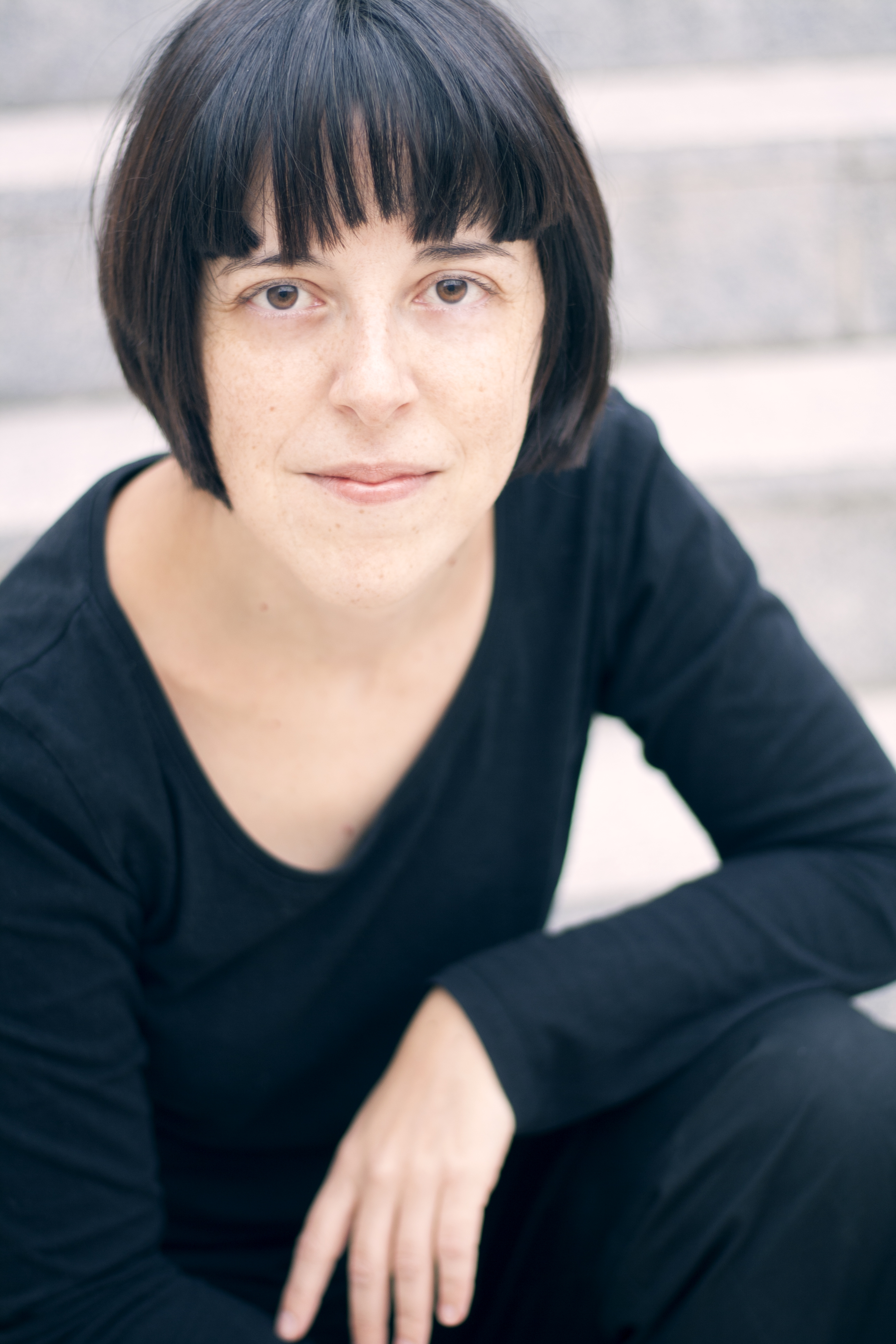
- Pilar Adón (2015)
- Born: 12 October 1971 (age 54); Madrid, Spain
- Education: Complutense University of Madrid
- Occupations: writer; translator
- Writing career
- Genres: novels; short stories; poems

Pilar Adón (Madrid, 12 October 1971) is a Spanish writer and translator. She is the author of the novels De bestias y aves, Las efímeras, and Las hijas de Sara; the short story collections La vida sumergida, El mes más cruel, Viajes inocentes and Las iras; the short novel Eterno amor; and the poetry collections Da dolor, Las órdenes, Mente animal, and La hija del cazador. Among the awards she has received are the Critical Eye Award (2005), the Madrid Bookstores Award for Best Book of Poems (2018), the Cálamo Award (2023), the Francisco Umbral Award for Book of the Year (2023), the Spanish Critics' Award for Best Book in Spanish (2023), and the National Literature Prize for Narrative (2023).

== Early life and education ==
Pilar Adón was born in Madrid on 12 October 1971. She graduated in law from the Complutense University of Madrid.

== Career ==
In 2022, she published the novel De bestias y pájaros (Galaxia Gutenberg), awarded the 2023 National Literature Prize for Narrative, the 2022 Spanish Critics' Award, the Francisco Umbral Award for Book of the Year 2022, and the 2022 Cálamo Otra Mirada Award, as well as being a finalist for the 5th Mario Vargas Llosa Biennial Novel Prize. In the novel genre, she is also the author of Las efímeras (Galaxia Gutenberg, 2015), considered by critics as one of the ten best novels of that year, and Las hijas de Sara (Alianza Editorial, 2003 / Puzzle (pocket), 2007). In 2021, she published the short novel, Eterno amor (Páginas de Espuma).

She is the author of the short story books Las iras (Galaxia Gutenberg, 2025), La vida sumergida (Galaxia Gutenberg, 2017), El mes más cruel (Impedimenta, 2010), for which she was named New Fnac Talent, and Viajes inocentes (Páginas de Espuma), for which she won the 2005 Ojo Crítico Narrative Prize. She has been included in different short story volumes, including among others, Cuento español actual (Cátedra, 2014); Mar de pirañas (Menoscuarto, 2012); Siglo XXI (Menoscuarto, 2010) and Pequeñas Resistencias 5 (Páginas de Espuma, 2010).

In 2011, she published the collection of poems La hija del cazador; in 2014, Mente animal;; in 2018, Las órdenes, for which she received the Book of the Year Award from the Madrid Booksellers' Guild, and Da dolor in 2020. All of them were published by La Bella Varsovia.

She has translated the story "Algo del otro mundo" (Impedimenta, 2024), by Iris Murdoch; the book of short stories "Estudios de lo salvaje" by the Australian author Barbara Baynton (Impedimenta, 2018); the essay by John Fowles, "El árbol", as well as the novels by Penelope Fitzgerald, Inocencia (Impedimenta, 2013) and El inicio de la primavera (Impedimenta, 2010); by Joan Lindsay, the historical novel, Picnic at Hanging Rock (Impedimenta, 2010); by Edith Wharton, the book of articles, Francia combatiente (Impedimenta, 2009) and her novel, Santuario (Impedimenta, 2007); the book of short stories by Christina Rossetti, Parecidos razonables; and the novel by Henry James, El mentiroso.

She has written for magazines such as Estación Poesía, Letras Libres, Mirlo, Litoral, Ínsula, Barataria, and Revista de Occidente.

== Awards and honours ==
- (2005). Critical Eye Awards, in the Narrative category, for Viajes inocentes (Páginas de Espuma).
- (2018). Madrid Booksellers Guild Awards, in the Poetry category, for Las órdenes (La Bella Varsovia).
- (2022). Francisco Umbral Prize for Book of the Year, for De bestias y aves. (Galaxia Gutenberg)
- (2022). Cálamo Award, in the Another View category, for De bestias y aves (Galaxia Gutenberg).
- (2022). Premio de la Crítica Española, for Best Narrative Book in Spanish, for De bestias y aves (Galaxia Gutenberg).
- (2023). National Literature Prize for Narrative, for De bestias y aves (Galaxia Gutenberg).
