= José Ovejero =

Spanish writer

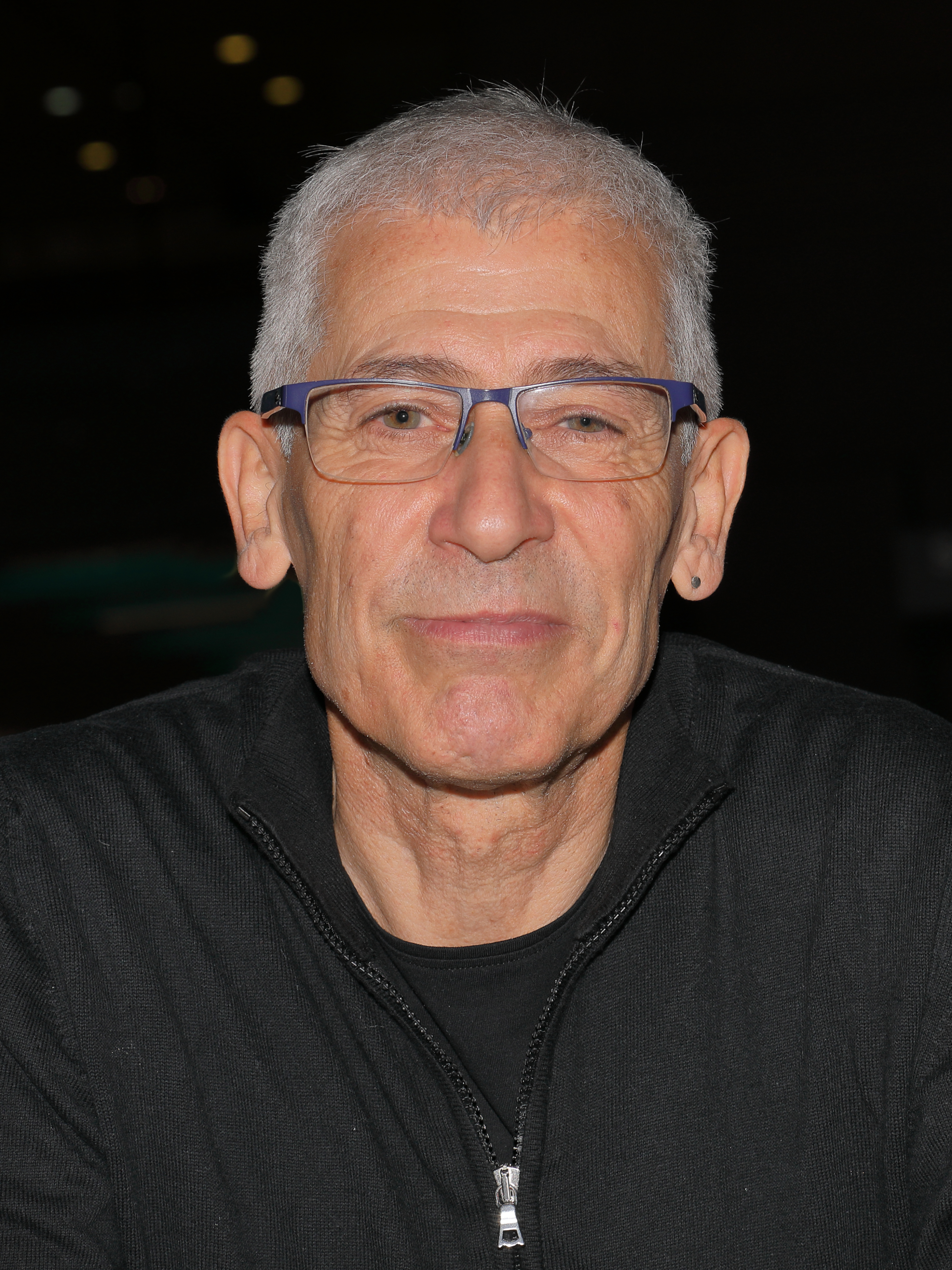
José Ovejero

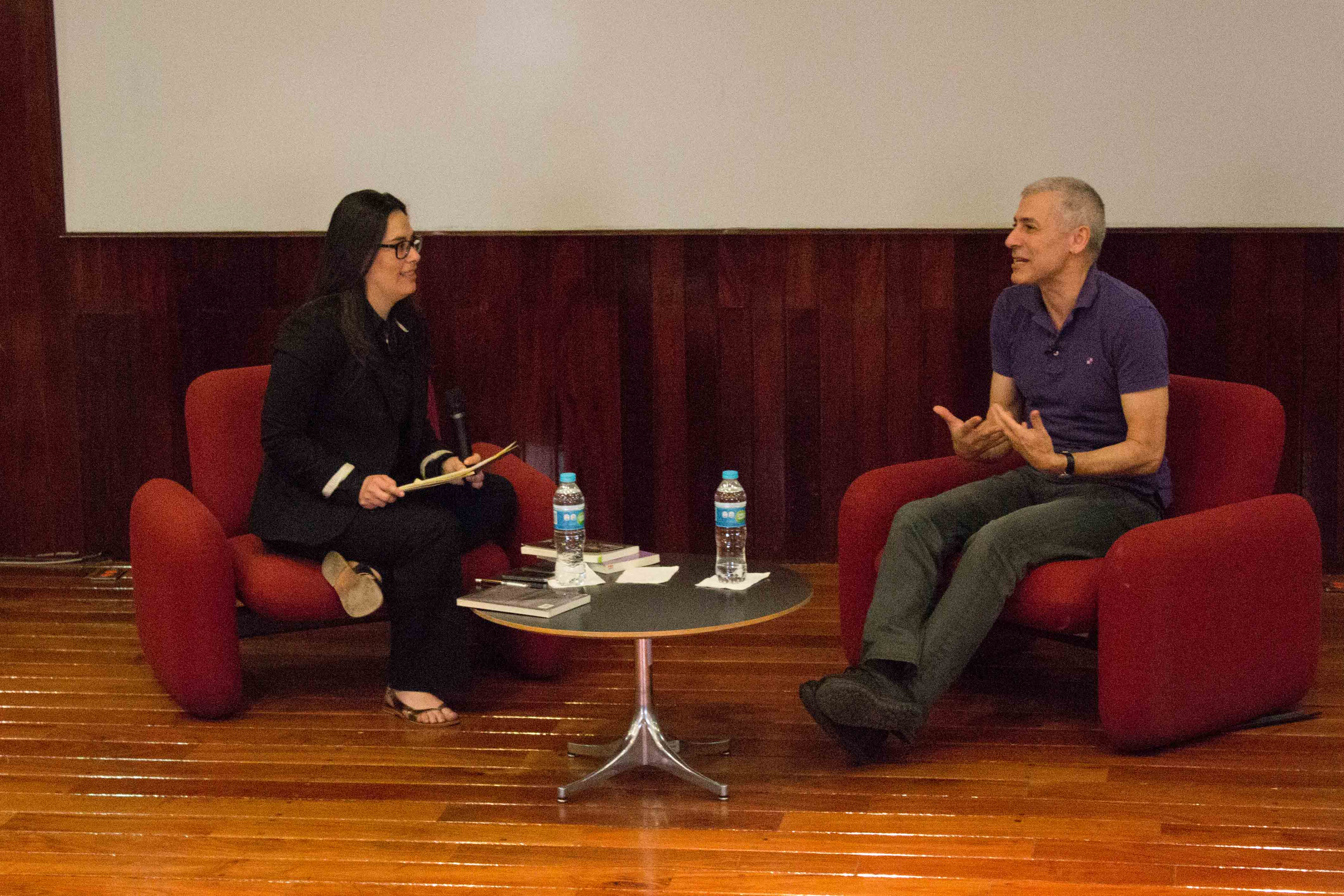
Ovejero giving a talk at the Monterrey Institute of Technology and Higher Education, Mexico City

José Ovejero (born 1958) is a Spanish writer. He was born in Madrid but has lived outside Spain for the greater part of his life. He has worked in a variety of genres, including poetry, drama, essays, short stories and novels. He won the 2013 Premio Alfaguara for his novel La invención del amor (Inventing Love).

== Biography ==
José Ovejero was born in 1958 in Madrid. He studied Geography and History at University in Spain and then moved to the Faculty of Egyptology in Bonn. In 1988 he moved to Brussels, where he worked as an interpreter for the EU until 2001. He now lives mainly in Madrid.

His first published work was a collection of narrative poems on Henry Morton Stanley. Since then he has published nine novels and as well short stories, essays and more poetry. He has also experimented with travel writing and drama.

Ovejero believes that “literature allows us to deconstruct the apparent order of reality, and from there you can construct new orders or create different unities.”

He has won several major literary prizes, including the 2013 Premio Alfaguara for his novel La invención del amor, translated into English as Inventing Love.

In 2018, José Ovejero presented three of his stories in a one-man stage show under the title ¡Qúe raros son los hombres! (Men Are So Strange!), touring theatres in Spain, Latin America, New York and various European cities - including London, as part of the Festival of Spanish Theatre (Festelón).

== Bibliography ==
=== Novels ===
1997 Añoranza del héroe (Nostagia for the Hero)

1999 Huir de Palermo (Fleeing Palermo)

2003 Un mal año para Miki (A Bad Year for Miki)

2005 Las vidas ajenas (Other People's Lives) Premio Primavera 2005

2007 Nunca pasa nada (Nothing Ever Happens)

2009 La comedia salvaje (The Wild Comedy)

2013 La invención del amor (Inventing Love) Premio Alfaguara 2013

2015 Los ángeles feroces (The Ferocious Angels)

2017 La seducción (The Seduction)

2019 Insurrección (Insurrection)

=== Poetry ===
1994 Biografía del explorador (Biography of the Explorer)

2002 El estado de la nación (The State of the Nation)

2012 Nueva guía al Museo del Prado (New Guide to the Prado Museum)

2017 Mujer lenta (Slow Woman) Premio Juan Gil-Albert 2017

=== Travel literature ===
1996 Bruselas (Brussels)

1998 China para hipocondríacos (China for Hypochondriacs)

=== Theatre ===
2008 Los políticos (The Politicians)

2008 La plaga (The Plague)

2017 ¡Qué raros son los hombres! (Men Are So Strange!)

=== Short stories ===
1996 Cuentos para salvarnos todos (Stories to Save Us All)

2000 ¡Qué raros son los hombres! (Men Are So Strange!)

2004 Mujeres que viajan solas (Women Travelling on Their Own)

2008 El príncipe es un sapo. Y viceversa (The Prince is a Toad. And Vice Versa)

2018 Mundo extraño (Strange World) Premio Setenil 2018

=== Essays ===
2011 Escritores delincuentes (Criminal Writers)

2012 La ética de la crueldad (The Ethics of Cruelty) Premio Anagrama de Ensayo

=== Translations into English ===
2013 Nothing Ever Happens, translated by Philip H.D. Smith & Graziella de Luis, Hispabooks ISBN 978-84-940948-0-4

2017 Inventing love, translated by Simon Deefholts & Kathryn Phillips-Miles, Peter Owen Publishers ISBN 978-0-72061-949-2
