= Juan de Ortega =

Juan de Ortega may refer to:

- Juan de Ortega (hermit) (1080–1163), Spanish priest and hermit
- Juan de Ortega (bishop of Coria), bishop from 1479 to 1485
- Juan de Ortega (bishop of Almería), bishop from 1492 to 1515
- Juan de Ortega (bishop of Chiapas), bishop from 1539 to 1540
- Juan de Ortega (mathematician), 16th-century Spanish mathematician

== See also ==
- San Juan de Ortega, a former monastery, now a stopping place on the Camino de Santiago in Spain
