= Clara Obligado =

Argentine-Spanish writer (born 1950)

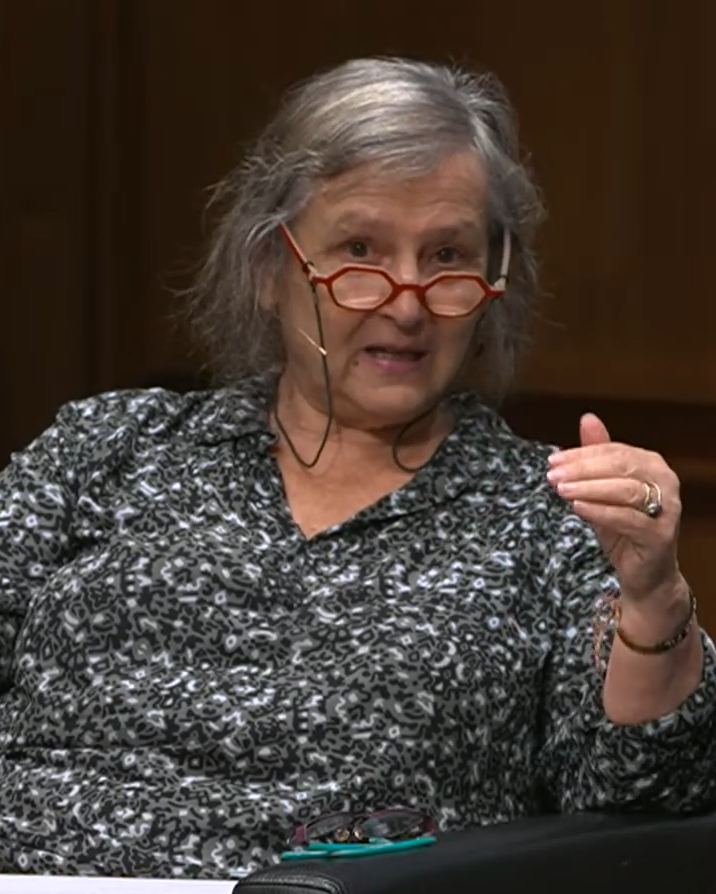
- Born: 1950 (age 75–76); Buenos Aires, Argentina
- Education: Pontifical Catholic University of Argentina
- Occupation: Writer
- Awards: Setenil Award (2012)

Clara Obligado Marcó del Pont (born 1950) is an Argentine-Spanish writer.

== Biography ==
Clara Obligado holds a licentiate in Literature from the Pontifical Catholic University of Argentina. Since 1976 she has lived in Madrid, a political exile of the Argentine regime known as the National Reorganization Process, and has Spanish citizenship.

She was one of the first people who began to give creative writing workshops, both independently and at the National University of Distance Education, the Círculo de Bellas Artes, and the bookstore Mujeres de Madrid, among many other institutions. In 1978, she founded the Creative Writing Workshop of Clara Obligado, one of the centers of this discipline with the longest standing in Spain, and which she currently directs, teaching courses both live and at a distance.

According to Juan Casamayor, editor of Páginas de Espuma (a publishing house specializing in the genre), Clara Obligado was the introducer of the micro-story in Spain, through her literary workshops.

In 1996 she received the Lumen Women's Award for her novel La hija de Marx. She is also the author of the novels Si un hombre vivo te hace llorar, No le digas que lo quieres, and Salsa.

In her essay books she has addressed topics related to women and culture, as in her work Mujeres a contracorriente.

In 2012 she won the Setenil Award with her short story book El libro de los viajes equivocados, and in 2015 the Juan March Cencillo Short Novel Award with Petrarca para viajeros.

== Works ==
=== Novels ===
- La hija de Marx, Editorial Lumen, 1996, reissued in 2013 by Galerna
- Si un hombre vivo te hace llorar, Editorial Planeta, 1998, translated into Greek
- No le digas que lo quieres, Editorial Anaya, 2002
- Salsa, Editorial Plaza y Janés, 2002, published in audio form in the United States
- Petrarca para viajeros, Editorial Pretextos, 2015
- Todo lo que crece: Naturaleza y escritura, Editorial Páginas de Espuma, 2021
- all that grows: nature and writing, X Artists' Books, 2025

=== Short stories ===
==== Anthologies and collaborations ====
- Sobre Morpios y otros cuentos, with Miguel Argibay, Antonio Calvo Roy, and Patricio Olivera; José Matesanz Editor, Trasgos de Metro collection, Madrid, 1982
- Cartas eróticas, in collaboration with Ángel Zapata, Ed. Temas de Hoy, 1990
- "El cazador", in: Mujeres al alba, Editorial Alfaguara, Madrid, 1999, pp. 107-122
- Manjares económicos, in collaboration with Mariángeles Fernández, Ed. Alianza.
- Deseos de mujer, in collaboration with Carmen Posadas, Mariángeles Fernández, and Pilar Rodríguez, Ed. Plaza y Janés

==== Microfiction anthologies ====
- Por favor, sea breve 1 and 2 (Ed. Clara Obligado). Editorial Páginas de Espuma, Madrid, 2001 and 2009

==== Story books ====
- Una mujer en la cama y otros cuentos, Catriel, Madrid, 1990
- Las otras vidas, Editorial Páginas de Espuma, Madrid, 2006
- El libro de los viajes equivocados, Editorial Páginas de Espuma, Madrid, 2011
- La muerte juega a los dados, Editorial Páginas de Espuma, Madrid, 2015

=== Editor of works by new authors ===
- Qué mala suerte tengo con los hombres (Ed. Clara Obligado), Catriel, Madrid, 1997
- Cuentos para leer en el metro (Ed. Clara Obligado), Catriel, Madrid, 1999
- Historias de amor y desamor (Ed. Clara Obligado), Trivium, Madrid, 2001
- Jonás y las palabras difíciles (Ed. Clara Obligado), Ed. Taller de Escritura Creativa, Madrid
- La Isla (Ed. Clara Obligado) Ed. Taller de Escritura Creativa, Madrid

=== Others ===
- Cartas eróticas, essay, with Ángel Zapata, Temas de Hoy, Madrid, 1993
- Manjares económicos: cocina para literatos, golosos y viajeros, with Mariángeles Fernández, Editorial Alianza, Madrid, 1995
- Qué se ama cuando se ama, with illustrations by Pat Andrea, Ed. Ovejas al lobo, Madrid, 1997
- Qué me pongo, essay, Editorial Plaza y Janés, Madrid, 2000
- Estética de la exclusión, essay, in: En sus propias palabras: Escritoras españolas ante el mercado literario, Henseler, Christine (ed.), Madrid: Torremozas, 2003, pp. 77-96
- Mujeres a contracorriente. La otra mitad de la historia, essay, Plaza y Janés, Madrid, 2004; expanded edition: Sudamericana, Buenos Aires, 2005, translated into French by Ed. Lattes
- ¿De qué se ríe la Gioconda? o ¿Por qué la vida de las mujeres no está en el arte?, essay, Editorial Temas de hoy, Madrid, 2006
- Deseos de mujer, with Mariángeles Fernández, Carmen Posadas, and Pilar Rodríguez, Plaza y Janés, Madrid, 2008
- "Viaje al centro de los libros", prologue of the anthology La distancia exacta. Cuentos sobre el viaje, Editorial Fin de Viaje, Baza (Granada), 2013
- 201, compiled by David Roas and José Donayre Hoefken, Lima: Ediciones Altazor, 2013

== Awards ==
- Lumen Women's Novel Award, for La hija de Marx, Barcelona, 1996
- Finalist for the 2nd Premio de Narrativa Breve Ribera del Duero, for El libro de los viajes equivocados, 2011
- Setenil Award, for El libro de los viajes equivocados, 2012
- Juan March Cencillo Short Novel Award, for Petrarca para viajeros, 2015
