= Eloy Tizón =

Spanish writer and critic

- Born: Eloy Tizón García; February 14, 1964 (age 62); Madrid, Spain
- Occupations: Writer, Critic
- Awards: Best Book of the Year, Premio Tormenta 2013 Finalist, III Ribera del Duero Prize for Short Fiction 2013 Critics Award (Premio Crítica) 2014 Setenil Award 2014

Signature
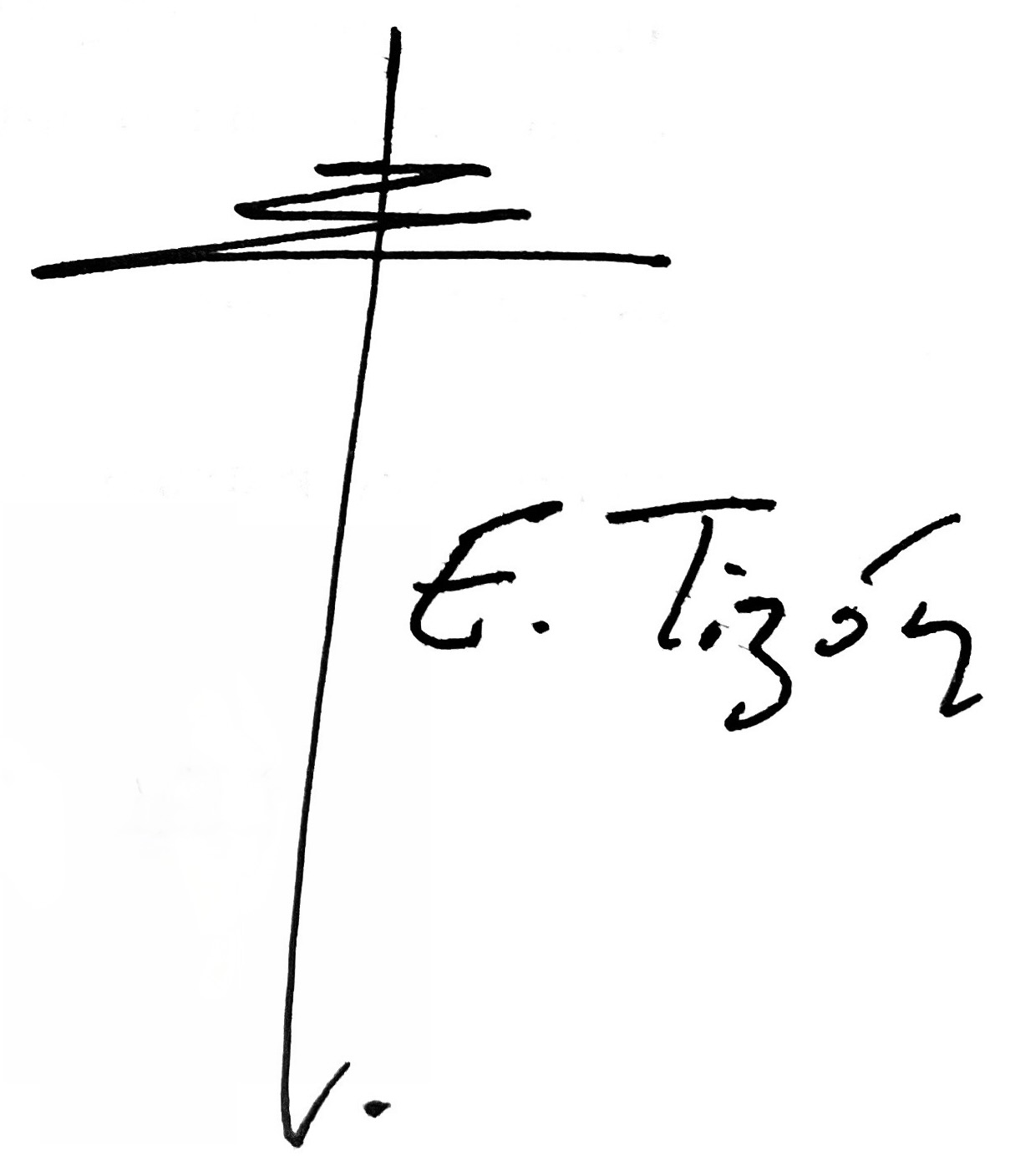

Eloy Tizón (born February 14,1964) is a Spanish writer. He was born in Madrid. He has published several novels and short story collections till date. He was nominated for the Premio Herralde in 1995 for his novel Seda salvaje. Velocidad en los jardines, a book of short stories, was chosen by El País as one of the most interesting Spanish-language books of the last 25 years.

Tizón is also a writing instructor and literary critic. He regularly publishes articles, columns, short stories, and aphorisms in the press: he has contributed to media outlets such as El País, El Mundo, Público, Telva, Revista de Occidente, Turia, and El Cultural de El Mundo, and has worked as a literary critic for Revista de Libros.

A university professor at the University of Castilla–La Mancha, he has also taught narrative workshops at various cultural centers, including Fuentetaja, La Casa Encendida, Festival Eñe, Escuela Superior de Artes y Espectáculos TAI, Hotel Kafka, and Relee, where he also worked as an editor.

In 2016, he chaired the jury for the Setenil Award.

In 2022 and 2023, he directed the literary short story festival Torrijos Cuenta, held in Torrijos (Toledo).

== Published Works ==
- La soledad, los viajes, el deseo (Marciana, 2024). ISBN 978-987-828-815-4.
- Plegaria para pirómanos (Páginas de Espuma, 2023). ISBN 978-84-8393-336-7.
- Herido leve. Treinta años de memoria lectora. (Páginas de Espuma, 2019). ISBN 978-84-8393-255-1.
- Velocidad de los jardines (Páginas de Espuma, 2017). ISBN 978-84-8393-212-4. A special re-edition of the collection celebrating 25 years since the work's publication, revised by the author and with a new prologue for this edition.
- Técnicas de iluminación (Páginas de Espuma, 2013). ISBN 978-84-8393-152-3. Winner of Best Book of the Year, Premio Tormenta 2013; Finalist, III Ribera del Duero Prize for Short Fiction 2013, the Critics Award (Premio Crítica) 2014 and the Setenil Award 2014.
- Parpadeos (Anagrama, 2006) ISBN 978-84-339-7134-0
- La voz cantante (Anagrama, 2004) ISBN 978-84-339-6862-3
- Labia (Anagrama, 2001) ISBN 978-84-339-2470-4
- Seda salvaje (Anagrama, 1995) ISBN 978-84-339-1022-6
- Velocidad de los jardines (Anagrama, 1992) ISBN 978-84-339-7332-0
- La página amenazada (Arnao, 1984).

=== Anthologies ===
- Páginas Amarillas (Lengua de Trapo, Madrid, 1997)
- Cien años de cuentos (Alfaguara, 1998)
- Los cuentos que cuentan (Anagrama, 1998)
- Pequeñas resistencias (Páginas de Espuma, 2002)
- Relato español actual (Fondo de Cultura Económica, México, 2003)
- Qué me cuentas (Páginas de Espuma, 2006)
- Cuento español actual 1992-2012 (Cátedra, 2014).

== Works in Translation ==
In English, Tizón's work has been anthologized in Madrid Tales, edited by Helen Constantine and Margaret Jull Costa (Oxford University Press, 2012) and Best European Fiction 2013 (Dalkey Archive Press, 2013), with stories selected by Aleksandar Hemon and a foreword by John Banville.

Some of his work has been translated into English, French, Italian, German, Slovenian, Finnish, and Arabic.
