= Sergi Bellver =

Spanish short story writer (born 1971)

Sergi Bellver (born 1971 in Barcelona) is a Spanish short story writer.

He is the author of the book Agua dura (2013) and his short stories have been published in ten anthologies in Spain and Latin America and also in the newspaper of Buenos Aires Tiempo Argentino and several Spanish magazines. He selected the collective books Chéjov comentado (2010), Mi madre es un pez (2011, with Juan Soto Ivars) and Madrid, Nebraska (2014), an anthology of Spanish short stories about the United States. He also wrote the prologue for new Spanish translations of Fiodor Dostoievski's The Gambler (novel) and Franz Kafka's The Metamorphosis. In 2011 he was one of the co-founders of the literary movement Nuevo Drama.

He has worked as a literary critic and columnist in the cultural supplement of the newspaper La Vanguardia, and in several magazines of Spain and Mexico, such as Qué Leer, Tiempo and Avispero. Since 2008 he leads creative writing workshops.
