= Fernando Iwasaki =

Peruvian writer and historian (born 1961)

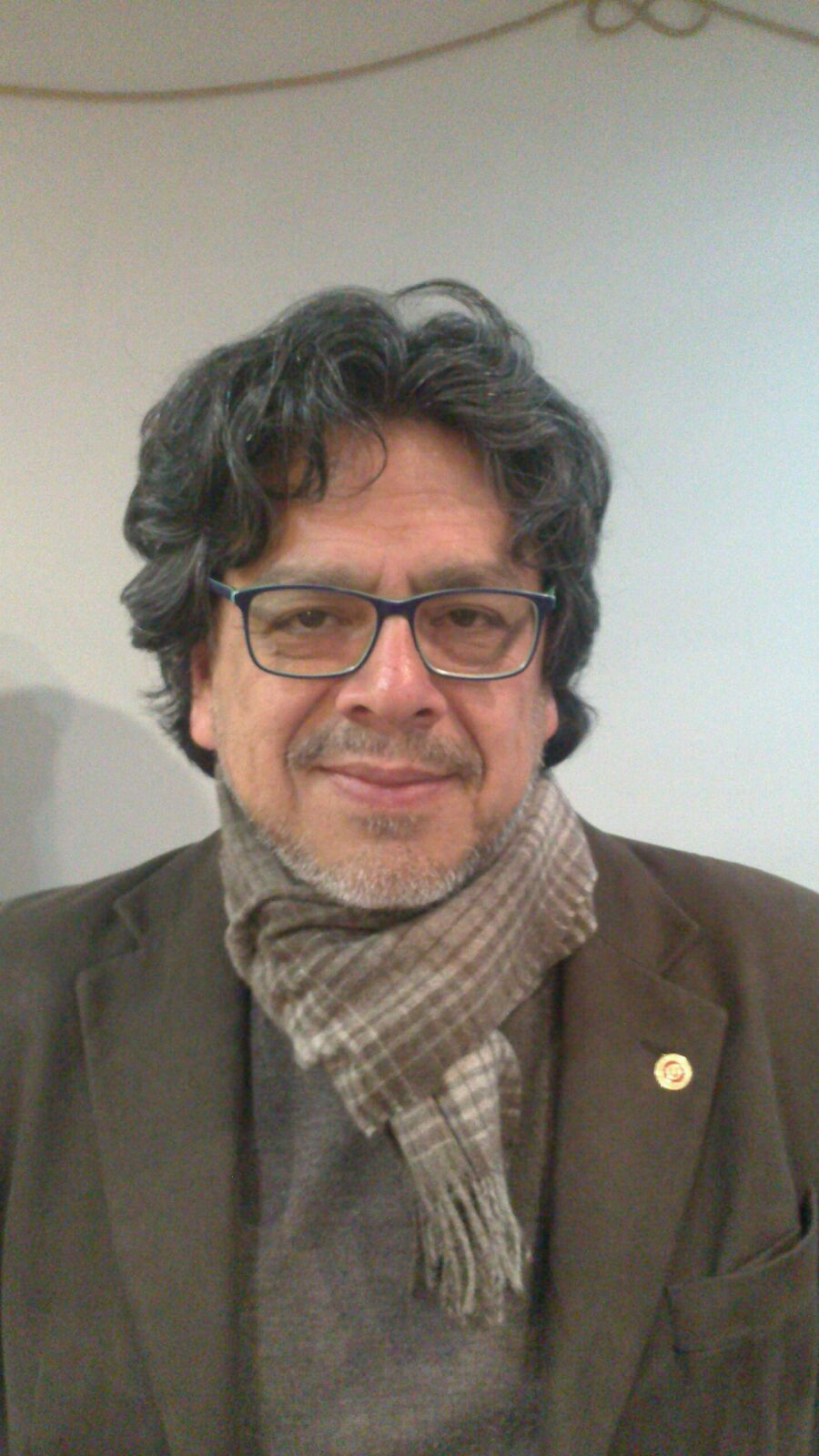
- Born: 1961 (age 64–65); Lima, Peru
- Citizenship: Peruvian
- Occupations: Historian; writer

Fernando Iwasaki Cauti (born 1961) is a Peruvian writer and historian.

Born into a family with multiple roots (Japan, Ecuador and Italy). While in Peru, he taught at the Pontifical Catholic University of Peru and the University of the Pacific in Lima. Since 1989, he has lived in Seville.

Iwasaki has published more than 20 volumes of fiction and non-fiction. He contributes regularly to various newspapers and magazines. His work has been translated into numerous languages, including Russian, English, French, Italian, Romanian and Korean.

== Selected works ==
Novels

- Neguijón (Alfaguara, 2005)
- El libro de buen amor (RBA, 2001)

Short stories

- España, aparta de mí estos premios (Páginas de Espuma, 2009)
- Helarte de amar (Páginas de Espuma, 2006)
- Ajuar funerario (Páginas de Espuma, 2004)
- Un milagro informal (Alfaguara, 2003)
- Inquisiciones Peruanas (Renacimiento, 1997)
- A Troya, Helena (Los Libros de Hermes, 1993)
- Tres noches de corbata (AVE, 1987)
- Papel Carbón (Páginas de Espuma, 2012)

Essays and articles

- Nabokovia Peruviana (La Isla de Siltolá, 2011)
- Arte de introducir (Renacimiento, 2011)
- Republicanos (Algaba Essay Prize, 2008)
- Mi poncho es un kimono flamenco (Sarita Cartonera, 2005)
- El Descubrimiento de España (Nobel, 1996)
- Una declaración de humor (Bodegas Olarra & Café Bretón Prize, 2012)
- Sevilla, sin mapa (Paréntesis, 2010)
- La caja de pan duro (Signatura, 2000)
- El sentimiento trágico de la Liga (Premio Fundación del Fútbol Profesional [Professional Football Foundation Prize], 1995).

History

- Extremo Oriente y Perú en el siglo XVI (Fundación Mapfre, 1992)
- Nación Peruana: entelequia o utopía (Crese, 1998),
- El comercio ambulatorio en Lima (co-author, ILD, 1989)
- Jornadas contadas a Montilla (editor, 1996)
- Francisco Solano, proceso diocesiano (editor, 2000)
