= Juan Cánovas Ortega =

Spanish writer & poet (born 1961)

Juan Cánovas Ortega is a Spanish short story writer and poet. He was born in 1961 in Tarrasa and studied Modern History at the Universidad Autónoma de Barcelona, where he later worked as an administrator. He has won a number of literary prizes.

== Prizes ==
- Certamen de Poesía Viernes Culturales de Cerdanyola del Vallés
- Premio Joaquín Benito Lucas de Talavera de la Reina
- Concurso de Poesía 'Tostón o Cochinillo de Arévalo'
- Certamen de Poesía Amorosa Noctiluca de Rincón de la Victoria
- Ciudad de Huelva de Relatos
- José Calderón Escalada de Reinosa de cuentos
- Concurso de Cuentos La Felguera
- Juan José Relosillas de Málaga de relatos,
- 'Vida y Salud' de relatos de la Universidad de Alicante
- Ciudad de Mula de cuentos
- Gerald Brenan de relato breve de Alhaurín el Grande
- Salvador García Jiménez de Chegín de cuentos
- Villa de Fuente Álamo de narraciones cortas
- Ciudad de Sant Andreu de la Barca de relato en castellano
- (finalist) Premio de narrativa breve by the la Fundación de Ferrocarriles Españoles.
