= Felipe Benítez Reyes =

Spanish writer

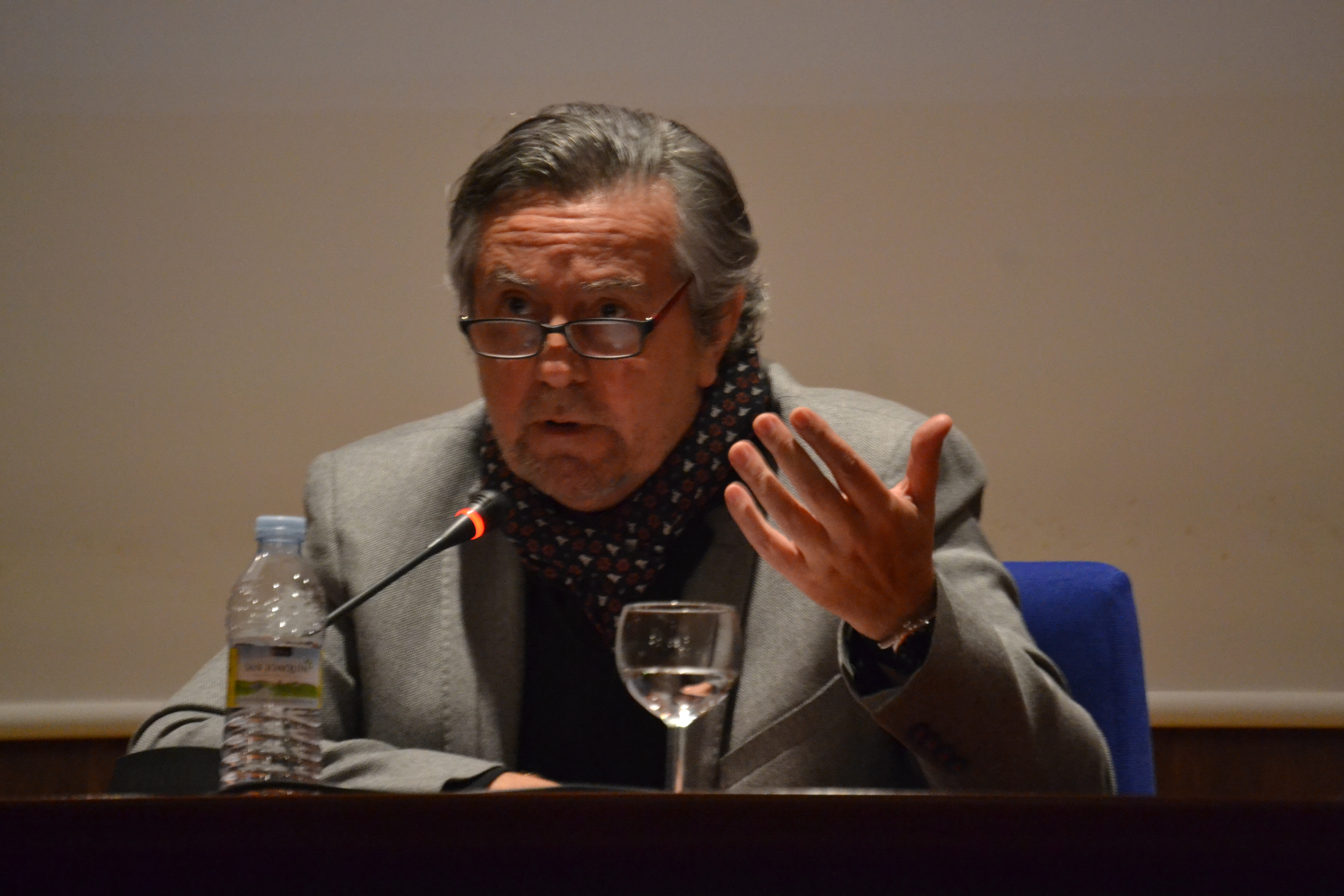
- Reyes at a conference in 2019
- Born: 1960 (age 65–66); Rota, Spain
- Education: University of Cádiz; University of Seville
- Writing career
- Language: Spanish
- Genres: Poetry, novels, short stories, essays, opinion pieces
- Notable awards: Premio de la Crítica; Premio Nacional de Literatura

Felipe Benítez Reyes (born 1960) is a Spanish writer. He was born in Rota, province of Cádiz, where he lives to this day.

== Biography ==
He studied at the University of Cádiz and University of Seville. His literary output spans multiple genres, including poetry, novels, short stories, essays, and opinion pieces.

Reyes' poetry has won, among others, the Premio de la Crítica and the Premio Nacional de Literatura. Both were awarded for his 1995 collection Vidas improbables. Among his novels, notable works include La propiedad del paraíso (1995), Humo (1995, Premio Ateneo de Sevilla), El novio del mundo (1998), El pensamiento de los monstruos (2002) y Mercado de espejismos (winner of the 2007 Premio Nadal). His 2009 collection of short fiction Oficios estelares (Destino, 2009) also won multiple prizes (Premio Mario Vargas Llosa NH, Premio Tiflos and Premio Hucha de Oro).

Reyes' works have been translated into English, Italian, Russian, French, Romanian and Portuguese.
