= Jorge Luis Cáceres =

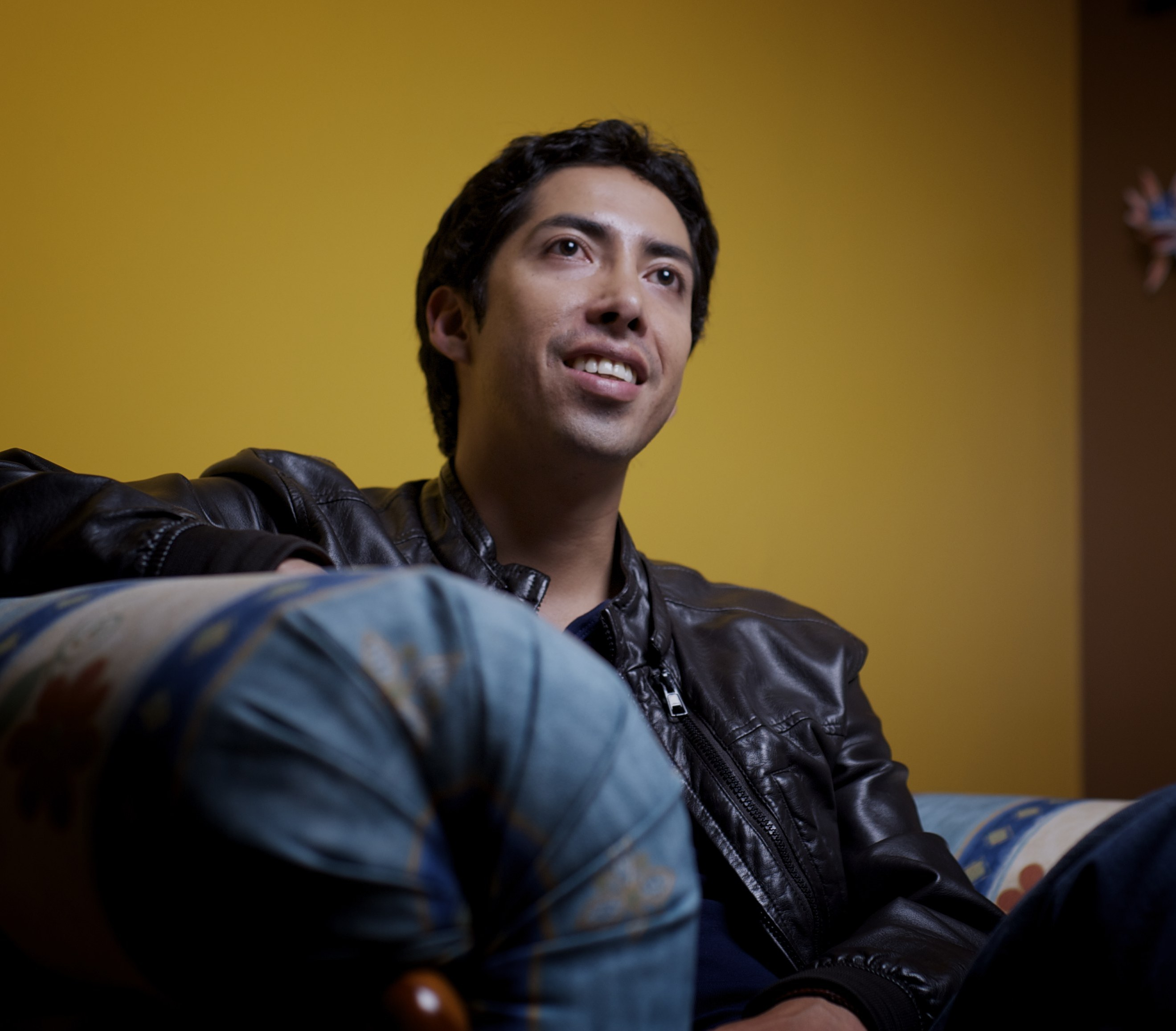
- Born: 1982 (age 43–44); Quito, Ecuador
- Occupation: Writer

Jorge Luis Cáceres (born 1982, Quito) is an Ecuadorian writer, editor, and anthologist.

== Career ==
He was recognized as one of "the 34 Latin American authors of unquestionable literary quality" in the 2012 Guadalajara International Book Fair. He has written the short story books Desde las sombras (2007), La flor del frío (2009), and Aquellos extraños días en los que brillo (2011). As an anthologist he prepared a collection of stories by Ecuadorian writers born between 1976 and 1982 for the National Autonomous University of Mexico under the title Lo que haremos cuando la ficción se agote (México, 2011) and a Spanish anthology tribute to Stephen King, No entren al 1408 (2013). His stories appear in the anthologies El Desafío de lo imaginario (Lima, 2011), Letras cómplices (Quito, 2011), GPS, antología de cuentistas ecuatorianos (Santa Clara, Cuba, 2014), Ecuador Cuenta (Del Centro Editores, Madrid, 2014) edited by Julio Ortega and in journals such as The Barcelona Review (Spain); Letralia (Venezuela); Baquiana (U.S.) and Punto en Línea (Mexico). He has completed his first novel Los diarios ficticios de Martín Gómez (The Fictitious Diaries of Martín Gómez), which will be published in 2016.

== Fiction ==
- Desde las sombras. (Quito: Editorial El Conejo, 2007). Short story
- La flor del frío. (Quito: Editorial El Conejo, 2009 y Salamanca: Editorial Amarante, E-book, 2011). Short story
- Aquellos extraños días en los que brillo. (Lima: Borrador Editores, 2011; Barcelona: Editorial Foc, E-book, 2015; Quito, 2016). Short story
- Bailad, malditos, bailad. (Miami: Suburbano Ediciones, 2015. E-book). Short story

== Anthologies ==
- Lo que haremos cuando la ficción se agote (Punto en Línea, UNAM, México, 2011) (Editor).
- No entren al 1408, antología en español tributo a Stephen King (La Biblioteca de Babel, Quito, 2013 y La Cifra Editorial / Conaculta, México D.F., 2014) (Editor).
- King, tributo al Rey del Terror (Interzona Editora, Buenos Aires, 2015) (Editor).

== Tribute to Stephen King ==
His 2013 anthology No entren al 1408 (English: Do Not Enter Room 1408), is a collection of horror stories by 22 Spanish-language authors, which aim to pay tribute to the style of the horror master Stephen King. The book was edited by the Ecuadorian writer Jorge Luis Cáceres, and published in Quito by the publisher La Biblioteca de Babel in 2013.

The Mexican edition of the book, to be published in 2014 by La Cifra Editorial, will contain stories by three additional authors: Javier Calvo (Barcelona, 1973). Carlos Yushimito (Lima, 1977), and Alexis Iparraguirre (Lima, 1974). The Argentinian edition, to be published by the Interzona Editora, will also contain these authors' stories, as well as new stories by three yet-to-be-announced Argentinian writers, according to an interview with the editor Jorge Luis Cáceres
