= Cristina Fernández Cubas =

Spanish author (born 1945)

Cristina Cubas
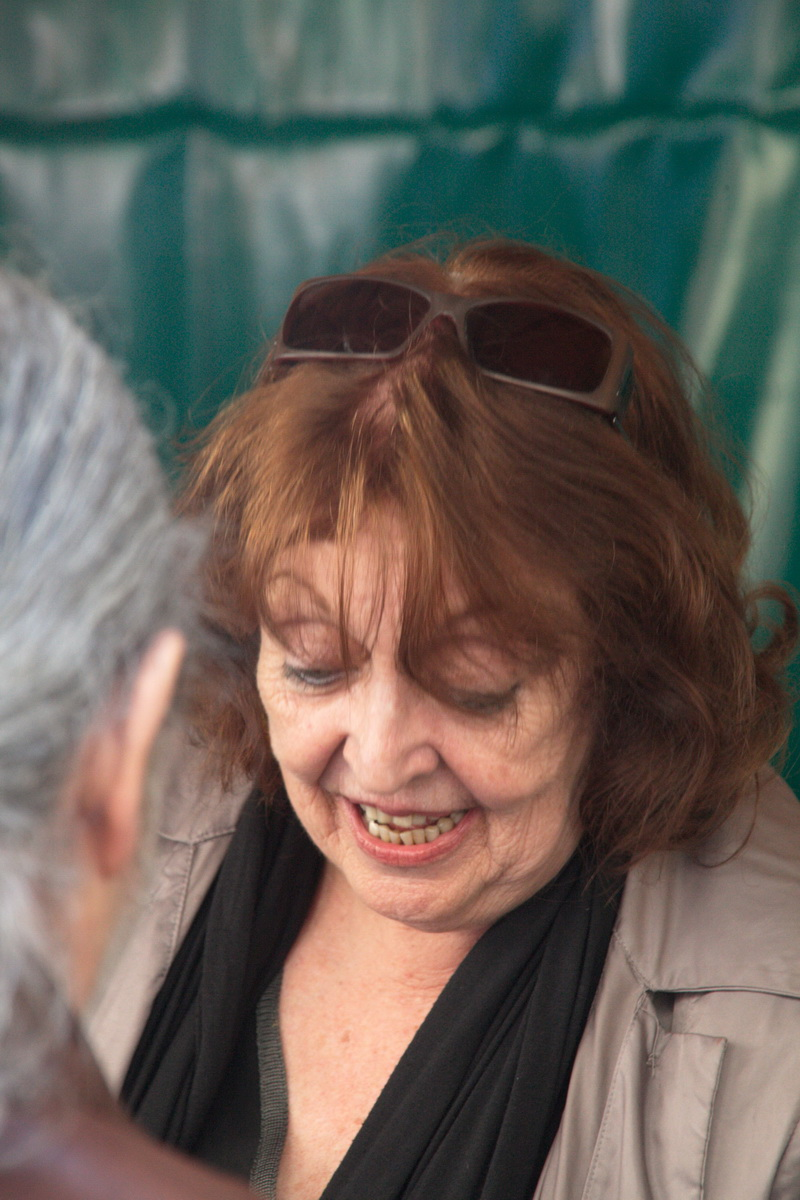
- Cubas in 2015
- Born: 1945 (age 80–81); Arenys de Mar, Catalonia, Spain
- Education: Universidad de Barcelona
- Occupations: Writer, journalist
- Spouse: Carlos Sagnier
- Awards: National Prize for Spanish Literature (2023); Miguel de Cervantes Prize (2026)

Cristina Fernández Cubas (born 1945) is a Spanish writer and journalist. She has been described as "one of the most important writers who have begun to publish since the end of the Franco dictatorship" and has been credited with inaugurating "a renaissance in the short story genre in Spain."

== Biography and literary career ==
Fernández Cubas studied Law and Journalism at the University of Barcelona, where she met the writer Carlos Trías Sagnier, whom she later married. They have travelled extensively, and lived in many different cities, including Cairo, Lima, Buenos Aires, Paris, and Berlin.

Fernández Cubas practised journalism from an early age and published her first collection of short stories, Mi hermana Elba, in 1980. This was followed by Los altillos de Brumal (1983), El ángulo del horror (1990), Con Ágatha en Estambul (1994), and Parientes pobres del diablo (2006), which won the Setenil Award in the same year. In 2009, her anthology Todos los cuentos was awarded several prizes, including the Premio Ciudad de Barcelona, the Premio Salambó, the Premio Qwerty and the Premio Tormenta.

She has written several novels. El año de Gracia (1985), principally set on the Scottish island of Gruinard, is an example of modern Spanish literature at its finest, with all the characteristics of a modern classic. It is partly based on a true story reported in El País, around which the author weaves a narrative which takes the reader into the realms of the fantastic. It’s a great adventure story and at the same time a voyage of personal discovery, a rite of passage. El columpio (1995) is the story of a girl's re-encounter with her three estranged uncles who share a house in a remote corner of the Pyrenees. In 2013, she published the novel La puerta entreabierta under the pseudonym Fernanda Kubbs, in which a sceptical journalist undergoes an unexpected transformation when she visits a clairvoyant.

She has also written a play, Hermanas de sangre (1998), a book of memoirs, Cosas que ya no existen (2001), which, much to her delight, won the Premio NH Hoteles for short stories in 2001, and an outstanding biography of Emilia Bazán (2001).

In 2016, Fernández Cubas was awarded the National Literature Prize for Narrative and the Premio de la Crítica Española for her collection of short stories La habitación de Nona (2015), translated into English as Nona’s Room. The work was also awarded with the Dulce Chacón Prize and was named as 'Book of the year' by La Vanguardia, Cultural, Babelia and ABC.

In December 2021, Fernández was awarded an honorary doctorate by the University of Alcalá de Henares. In November 2023, she was awarded the Premio Nacional de las Letras Españolas.

In November 2026, Fernández was awarded the Miguel de Cervantes Prize, one of the most prestigious awards in Spanish-language literature.

== Scholar and critical response ==
In his review of La habitación de Nona in the New York Times, the critic Terrence Rafferty comments: "In these six elegant stories she’s most interested in the ambiguities and periodic disturbances that plague the imagination, and reports on them with the appropriate sense of awe, even of dread. In the territory of the imagination, the threat of madness is never too far away, a dark cloud hovering."

Another critic, Lucy Scholes, has commented that the author "brings darkness to light with uncanny flair", also warning that these, "off-kilter Gothic short stories are remarkable but not for the faint-hearted". Her stories have been praised for their surrealism by literary critic Rachel Rees.

In the words of the academic Phyllis Zatlin, "her stories tend to explore the mysteries of both external reality and of the human psyche. Most of them, including some that fall outside the fantastic mode, explore inner worlds of fantasy and unconscious desires".

== Awards and honors ==
- Premio NH Hoteles para Cuentos (2001), for Cosas que ya no existen
- Premio Setenil (2006), for Parientes pobres del diablo
- Premio Cálamo (2008), for Todos los cuentos
- Premi Ciutat de Barcelona (2009), for Todos los cuentos
- Premio Salambó (2009), for Todos los cuentos
- Premio Qwerty (2009), for Todos los cuentos
- Premio Tormenta (2009), for Todos los cuentos
- Premio de la Crítica (2015), for La habitación de Nona
- Premio Dulce Chacón (2016), for La habitación de Nona
- Premio Nacional de Narrativa (2016), for La habitación de Nona
- Premio Gabriel, for her life's work.
- Premio Nacional de las Letras Españolas (2023)
- Premio Mediterráneo Albert Camus (2026)
- Premio Miguel de Cervantes 2026

== Published works ==
=== Short stories ===
- Mi hermana Elba (My Sister Elba), Tusquets Editores, 1980
- Los altillos de Brumal (The Attics of Brumal), Tusquets Editores, 1983
- El ángulo del horror (The Angle of Horror), Tusquets Editores, 1990
- Con Ágatha en Estambul (With Agatha in Istanbul), Tusquets Editores, 1994
- Parientes pobres del diablo (Poor Relations to the Devil), Tusquets Editores 2006
- Todos los cuentos (All the Short Stories), Tusquets Editores, 2008
- La habitación de Nona (Nona’s Room), Tusquets Editores, 2015

=== Novels ===
- El año de Gracia (The Gap Year), Tusquets Editores, 1985
- El columpio (The Swing), novel, Tusquets Editores,1995
- La puerta entreabierta (The Half-Open Door), [by "Fernanda Kubbs"] Tusquets Editores, 2013

=== Other ===
- Cris y Cros (Criss-Cross) and El vendedor de sombras (The Seller of Shadows), Alfaguara, 1988
- Hermanas de sangre (Blood Sisters), play, Tusquets Editores, 1998
- Emilia Pardo Bazán, biography, Editorial Omega, 2001
- Cosas que ya no existen (Things Which No Longer Exist), memoirs, Lumen 2001, Tusquets Editores 2011
- De mayor quiero ser bruja (When I Grow Up I Want to be a Witch), children's story, illustrated by Luisa Vera, Malpaso Ediciones, 2017

== Translations into English ==
- Blood Sisters (Hermanas de sangre) translated by Karen Denise Dinicola, Estreno Press, 2003, ISBN 978-1913693-14-5
- Nona’s Room (La habitación de Nona) translated by Kathryn Phillips-Miles and Simon Deefholts, Peter Owen Publishers, 2017, ISBN 978-072061953-9
- The Penguin Book of Spanish Short Stories, edited by Margaret Jull Costa, includes A Fresh Start (La nueva vida) translated by Kathryn Phillips-Miles & Simon Deefholts, Penguin Books, 2021, ISBN 978-024139047-4
- Take Six: Six Spanish Women Writers, edited and translated by Kathryn Phillips-Miles and Simon Deefholts: Dedalus Books, 2022. (Contains new translations of stories by Cristina).
- The Gap Year (El año de Gracia) translated by Kathryn Phillips-Miles and Simon Deefholts, The Clapton Press, 2022.
