= Manuel Moyano =

Spanish writer (born 1963)

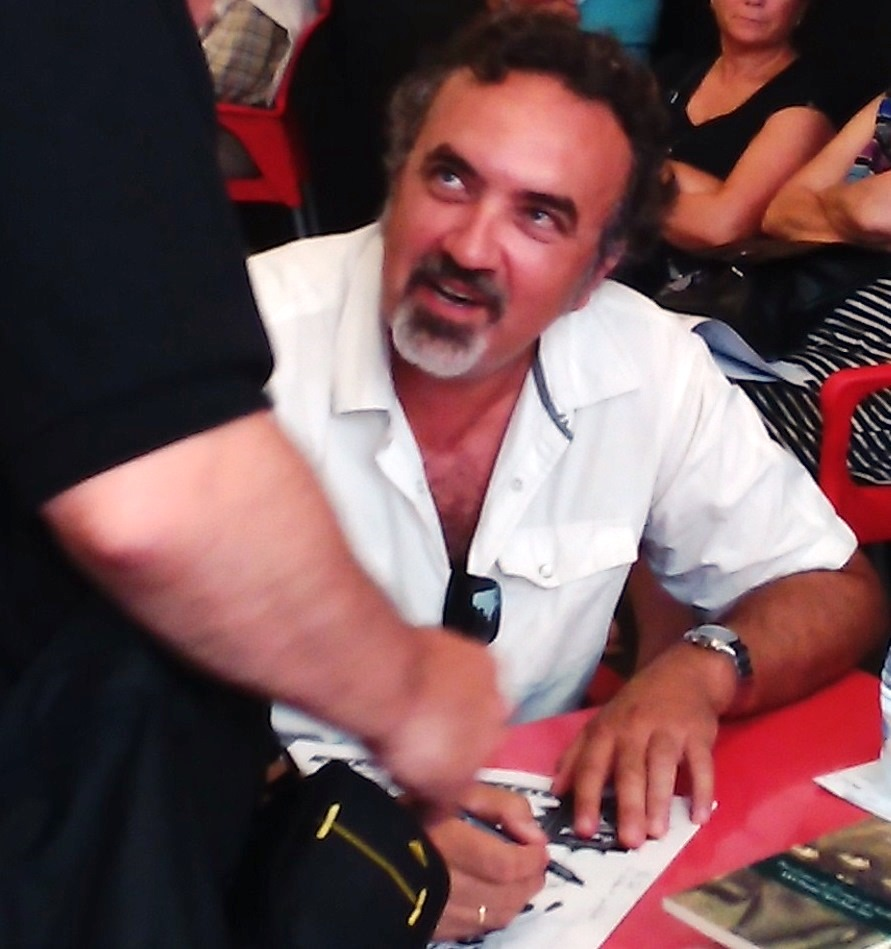
- Born: 1963 (age 61–62)
- Notable works: El amigo de Kafka; El imperio de Yegorov

Manuel Moyano (born 1963) is a Spanish writer. Born in Cordoba, he grew up in Barcelona. He studied agricultural engineering at the University of Cordoba. Since 1991, he has lived in Molina de Segura in Murcia. His first book El amigo de Kafka (2001) won the Tigre Juan Award for "best debut work" and was also chosen by El Mundo as one of the best debuts of the year. Since then, he has written many other books of fiction and non-fiction. His most recent work El imperio de Yegorov was nominated for the Premio Herralde and has been translated into Dutch.

== Works ==
- El amigo de Kafka (2001)
- Dietario mágico (2002)
- El oro celeste (2003)
- Galería de apátridas (2004)
- El lobo de Periago (2005)
- La memoria de la especie (2005)
- La coartada del diablo (2006, Premio Tristana de Novela Fantástica)
- El experimento Wolberg (2008, Premio Libro del Año Región de Murcia)
- Teatro de ceniza (2011)
- Travesía americana (2013)
