= David Roas =

Spanish writer and literary critic

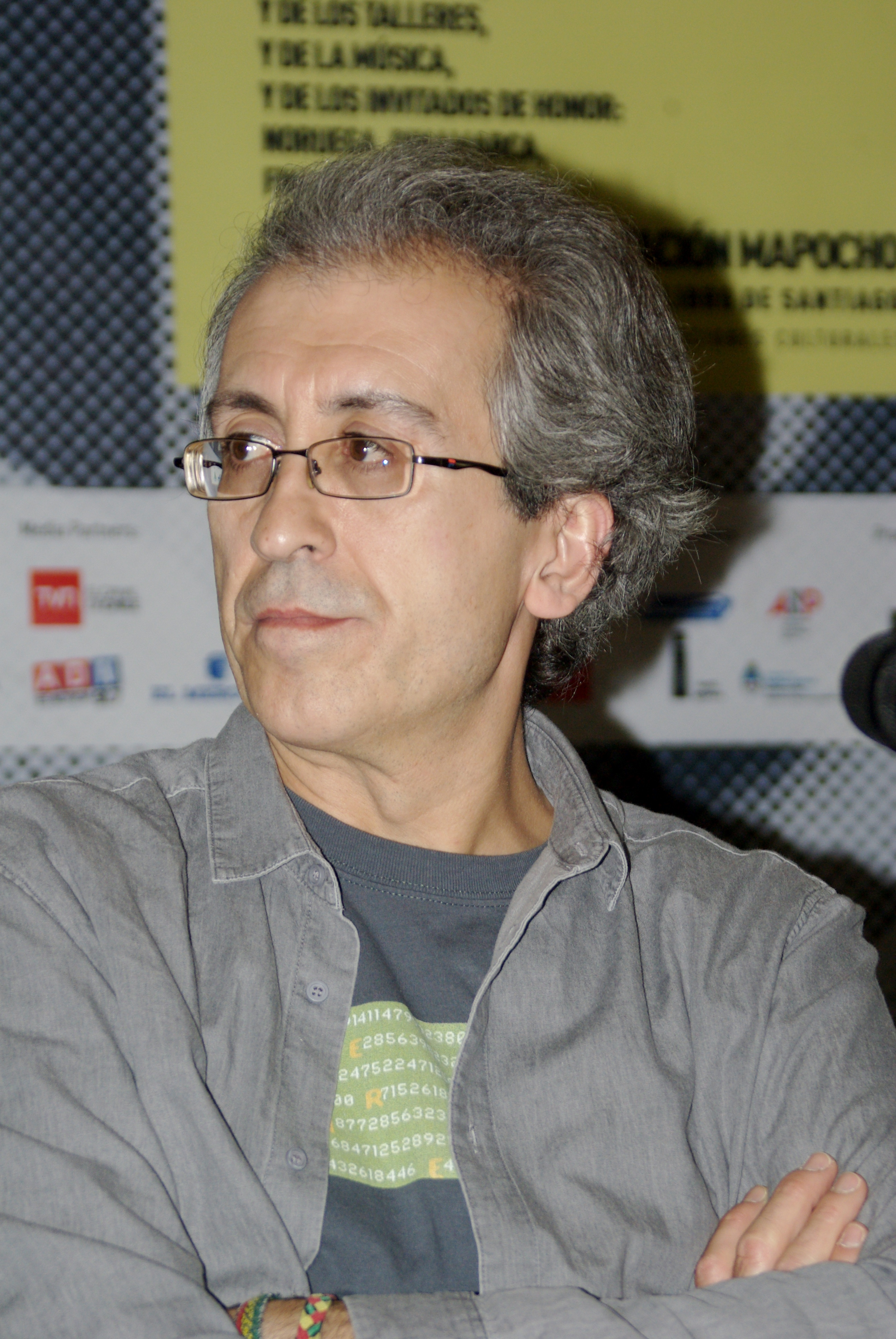
Roas at the Santiago International Book Fair 2015

David Roas (born 1965 in Barcelona, Spain) is a Spanish writer and literary critic, specialising in fantastic literature. He is currently a professor of Literary Theory and Comparative Literature at the Autonomous University of Barcelona, where he heads up the Fantastic Literature Studies Group (Grupo de Estudios sobre lo Fantástico – GEF).

He has published eight collections of short stories, the first in 1996 and the latest in April 2018, as well as several works of literary criticism, including an analysis of the influence of Edgar Allan Poe on the Spanish genre of fantastic literature and a biography of the writer Enrique Jardiel Poncela, co-authored with Fernando Valls.

Roas has been described by the writer and journalist, Rubén Sánchez Trigos as "probably [Spain's] leading specialist in fantastic literature". His most recent collection of short stories was published by Editorial Páginas de Espuma, Madrid, in April 2018. In the words of Jose Oliva, in this latest collection Roas establishes "a permanent dialogue in the form of homages to other authors, such as Cristina Fernández Cubas, Rod Serling (of The Twilight Zone fame), Mercedes Abad, Eduardo Berti, or parodying George A. Romero." In this regard he has commented, "I don't know how to write in a vacuum. I read fantastic literature."

In 2013 he published the novel La estrategia del Koala . According to the literary magazine Zona de Obras, this story "exudes a certain rage and uses humor to question one's own identity, the certainty of memory, and the influence of family on oneself.

== Bibliography ==
Fiction

- Los dichos de un necio (Manresa, 1996)
- Celuloide sangriento (Diari de Sabadell, 1996)
- Horrores cotidianos (Palencia, 2007 y Lima 2009)
- Distorsiones (Páginas de Espuma, Madrid 2010)
- Intuiciones y delirios (Editorial Micrópolis, Lima, 2012)
- La estrategia de koala (Candaya, Barcelona, 2013)
- Bienvenidos a Incaland (Páginas de Espuma, Madrid, 2014)
- Invasión (Páginas de Espuma, Madrid, 2018)

Non-fiction

- Teorías de lo fantástico (Arco Libros, Madrid, 2001)
- Enrique Jardiel Poncela (Eneida Editorial, Madrid, 2001) (Biography, co-authored with Fernando Valls)
- Hoffmann en España (Biblioteca Nueva, Madrid, 2002)
- De la maravilla al horror, Los orígenes de lo fantástico en la cultura española (1750-1860) (Mirabel, Vilagarcía de Arousa, 2006)
- La sombra del cuervo. Edgar Allan Poe y la literatura fantástica española del siglo XIX (Madrid, 2011)
- Tras los límites de lo real. Una definición de lo fantástico (Madrid, 2011).
- Meditaciones de un arponero (E.D.A., Málaga, 2008)
- La sombra del cuervo. Edgar Allan Poe y la literatura fantástica española del siglo XIX (Devenir, Madrid, 2011)
- Tras los límites de lo real. Una definición de lo fantástico. (Páginas de Espuma, Madrid, 2011)

Anthologies (as editor)

- El castillo del espectro. Antología de relatos fantásticos españoles del siglo XIX (Barcelona, 2002)
- Cuentos fantásticos del siglo XIX (España e Hispanoamérica) (Madrid, 2003)
- La realidad oculta. Cuentos fantásticos españoles del siglo XX (Palencia, 2008) - with Ana Casas

== Awards ==
- Setenil Award, 2011 for Distorsiones
