= Juan de Ortega (mathematician) =

Spanish mathematician

Frontispiece of Ortega's Tratado

Juan de Ortega (born Palencia, Spain, c. 1480; died c. 1568), was a Spanish mathematician. He wrote some of the earliest works on commercial arithmetic, and discovered an improved method for calculating square roots.

== Life ==
Very little is known of Ortega's life. He was a member of the Dominican Order in Aragon, and he taught arithmetic and geometry in Spain and Italy.

== Mathematical contributions ==
For his work on arithmetic Ortega drew on that of Boethius and of 13th-14th century mathematicians.

A widely known publication among Ortega's works was Tratado subtilissimo de Aritmetica y de Geometria ("Most refined treatise on arithmetic and geometry") (Barcelona, 1512). The work was published in Spain, France and Italy, and translated into several languages. The Tratado was innovative in focusing on the practical, in particular commercial, application of arithmetical and geometrical techniques. In later editions this work also introduces a novel approximation method for calculating square roots, which appears to be largely based on the Pell equation and thereby the best available technique, even though no general solution of this equation is known to have been found until much later.

Another textbook by Ortega was Cursus quattuor mathematicarum artium liberalium ("Course of four mathematical arts") (Paris, 1516).

Another textbook by Ortega was "Conpusicion de la arte de la arismetica y juntamente de geometría"
