= Rodolfo Santullo =

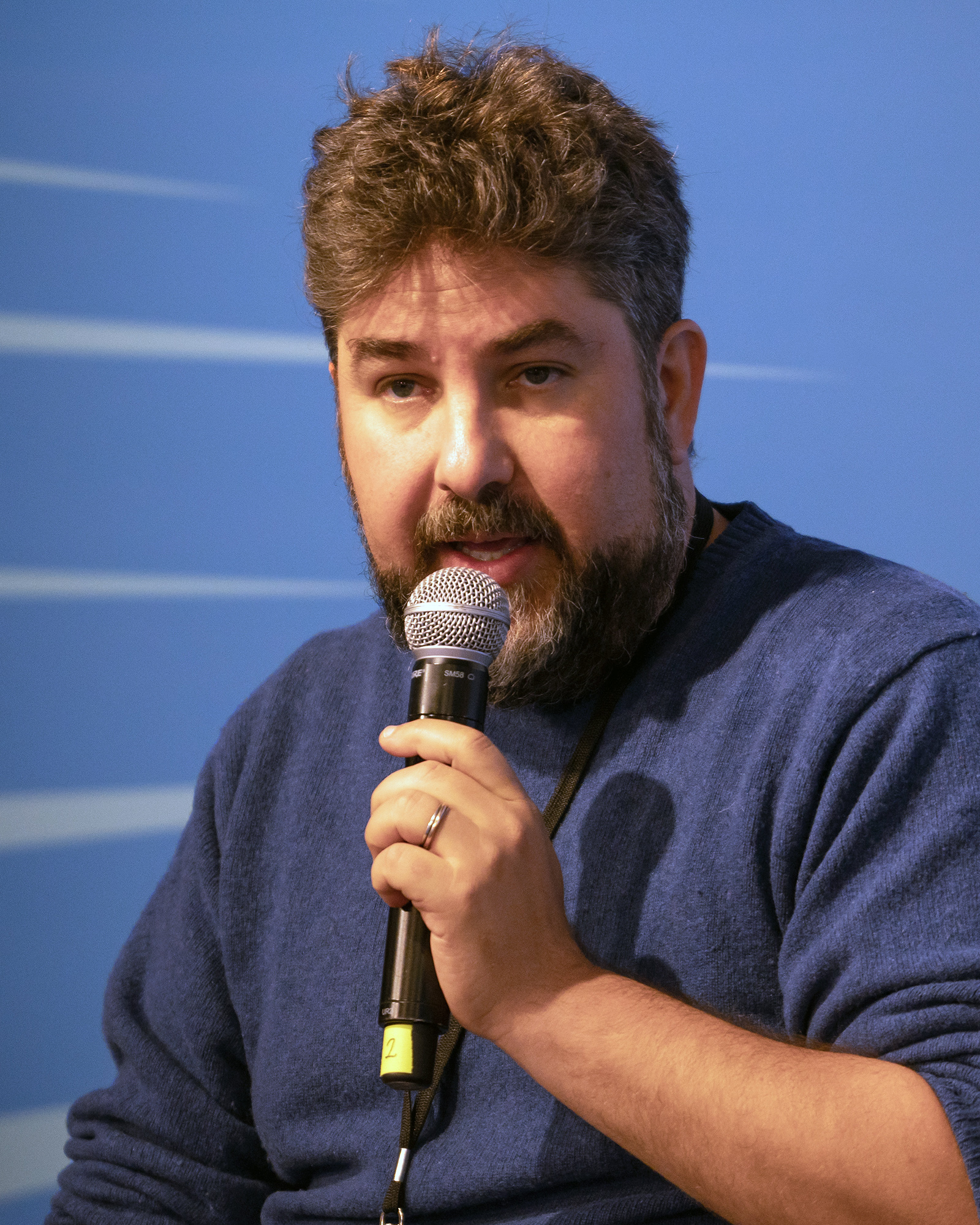
- Santullo in 2023
- Born: 19 November 1979 (age 46); Mexico City, Mexico
- Occupations: Writer; journalist; comic book writer; editor

Rodolfo Santullo (born 19 November 1979, in Mexico City) is a Mexican-born Uruguayan writer, journalist, comic book writer, and editor.

Santullo moved to Montevideo and has lived there since 1984.

He is the author of the graphic novels “Los últimos días del Graf Spee” (2008), “Cena con Amigos” (2009), “Acto de Guerra” (2010), "Valizas" (2011), "Dengue" (2012), "El Club de los Ilustres" (2012), "Zitarrosa" (2012), "40 Cajones" (2012), "Etchenike" (2013), "Far South" (2013), "Misterios de Cuarto Cerrado" (2014), "Malandras" (2014), "El Club de los Ilustres: Conspiración en las Sombras" (2014), "Merlín: El Druida" (2015), "El Oro del Zar" (2015), "HOUNDS" (2016), "Banda de Orcos" (2016), "Reflejo" (2016) and "El Dormilón" (2016) among others. He wrote a monthly column for the Argentine magazine Fierro and writes weekly for the Argentine website Historietas Reales. He is the author of the short story book “Perro Come Perro” (2006) and the novels “Las Otras Caras del Verano” (co-written with Martín Bentancor, 2008), “Cementerio Norte” (2009), “Sobres Papel Manila” (2010), "Aquel Viejo Tango" (co-written with Martín Bentancor, 2011), "El Ultimo Adiós" (2013), "Matufia" (2014) and "Luces de Neón" (2016). He was awarded the Solano López Prize for best writing for his graphic novel "Cena con Amigos". In 2008 he was awarded a grant by the Ministry of Education and Culture of Montevideo, in the Graphic Story category. In 2009 he shared the First Prize in the JC Onetti Contest with the comic book artist Matías Bergara.

In 2015 "Dengue" was published in United States by Humanoids and "Forty Coffins" by Space Goat Publishing.

He is currently the editor of the publishing house Grupo Belerofonte, which specializes in the publishing of comic books.
