= Pedro Ugarte =

Spanish writer and columnist

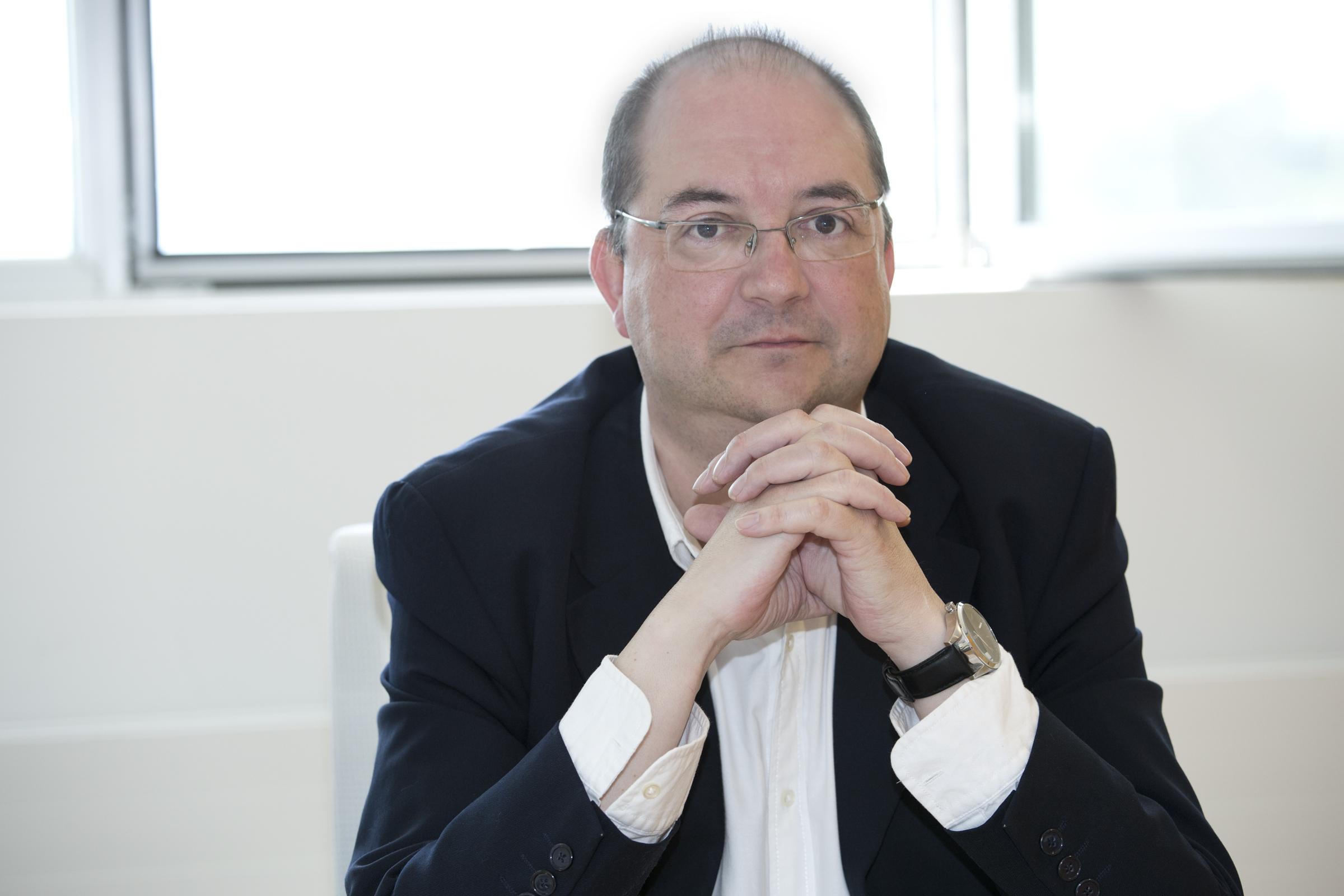
- Pedro Ugarte
- Born: January 15, 1963 (age 63)
- Writing career
- Language: Writer, Columnist

Pedro Ugarte Tamayo (born 15 January 1963) is a Spanish writer and columnist. He was born in Bilbao and studied law at the Universidad de Deusto. He now teaches at the Universidad del País Vasco. He has also worked with Radio Euskadi and contributed columns to the Basque edition of El País. He has written many works of fiction, spanning novels and short stories. His debut novel Los cuerpos de las nadadoras was nominated for the Premio Herralde, while his most recent novel El país del dinero won the Premio Logroño de Novela in 2011. His work has been translated into Italian, French, German and Polish.
