= Alexis Iparraguirre =

Peruvian short story writer

Alexis Iparraguirre (April 8, 1974) is a Peruvian short story writer and literary critic. In 2004, he won the Pontifical Catholic University of Peru National Prize for fiction.

In 2013, the Guadalajara International Book Fair chose him as part of Latinoamérica viva, its annual meeting for emerging Latin American literary voices, and, in 2021, he was included in a list of ten essential Peruvian writers (diez autores peruanos imprescindibles) at the beginning of the 21st Century by the Spanish daily newspaper El País.

== Biography ==
Iparraguirre was born in Lima, Peru. He studied Hispanic literature at the Pontifical Catholic University of Peru (Spanish: Pontificia Universidad Católica del Perú, PUCP). In 2000, he won the PUCP Student Union's Literary Prize for fiction, and four years later, in 2004, El inventario de las naves (Inventory of Ships), his then unpublished collection of short stories, won the PUCP National Prize for fiction.

In 2011, he moved to the United States, obtaining an MFA in Creative Writing in Spanish from New York University, and a Ph.D. in Latin American, Iberian, and Latino Cultures from the Graduate Center, CUNY. Since 2014 he has taught Spanish and Hispanic Cultures at the City College of New York (CCNY) and John Jay College of Criminal Justice, as well as independent creative writing workshops.

Following the publication of El inventario de las naves, in 2005, several of Iparraguirre's short stories appeared in Peruvian, Latin American and Latino anthologies, including Selección peruana 1990–2005 (2005), El futuro no es nuestro (2008), El cuento peruano 2001–2010 (2013), and Estados Hispanos de América. Narrativa latinoamericana made in USA (2016). In 2016, his second book of short stories, El fuego de las multitudes (Fire of Crowds) was chosen short story book of the year by most of the cultural columns in the Peruvian press, including the daily newspaper Perú.21 and the political magazine Caretas.

In 2021, the Spanish daily newspaper El País chose Iparraguirre as one of the ten essential contemporary Peruvian writers (diez narradores peruanos imprescindibles).

In 2022, he co-edited with Francisco Joaquín Marro Esta realidad no existe (This Reality Does Not Exist), a collection of 14 science fiction short stories by Peruvian writers.

Iparraguirre's works have been partially translated into English.

== Themes ==
According to Carlos Amador: "In Peruvian writer Alexis Iparraguirre's short story collection, El inventario de las naves (2005), the short stories "Orestes" and "Sábado" manifest the specific role that racialized, lumpenproletarian life, ecological collapse, and biomechanical engineering, in the form of hallucinogens or mutants, have in developing literature's reflective and predictive capacity. Set in a Peru stripped down to its barest national markers, Iparraguirre's stories write about the way in which everyday life, comprising Peruvian economic contradictions and colonial racial hierarchies, is marked in the logics of enfleshing into discourses of subjectivity. The precariousness of social life and the ways which the matter of the world is social, effectual, and dynamic are represented as an agent, an actively material sphere that unsettles historical blindnesses and challenges binary logic of the human and non-human."

== Books ==
- His book of short stories, El inventario de las naves (Inventory of Ships), won the prestigious PUCP National Prize for Narrative in 2005.
- In 2016, he published El fuego de las multitudes (The Fire of Crowds), his second collection of short stories.
- In 2021, he co-edited (with Francisco Joaquín Marro) Esta realidad no existe (This reality does not exist), a collection of 14 science-fiction short stories by Peruvian writers.
- In 2022, he published La casa de presente sin ventanas (House of Present Without Windows), a weird fiction story.
- In 2025, he edited Nada humano sobrevive aquí (Nothing Human Survives Here), an anthology of Peruvian horror stories inspired by H.P. Lovecraft.

== Works published in anthologies ==
- Selección peruana 1990–2005 (compilation by Álvaro Lasso), Lima, Estruendomudo Editores, 2005.
- Selección peruana 1990–2007 (compilation by Álvaro Lasso), Lima, Estruendomudo Editores, 2007.
- Disidentes. Muestra de la nueva narrativa peruana (selection and introduction by Gabriel Ruiz Ortega), Lima, Revuelta Editores, 2007.
- Nuevos lances, otros fuegos (compilation by Miguel Ildefonso), Lima, San Marcos, 2007.
- Disidentes 2. Muestra de la nueva narrativa peruana (selection and introduction by Gabriel Ruiz Ortega), Lima, Altazor Editores, 2012.
- 17 fantásticos cuentos peruanos. Antología, vol. 2 (selection and introduction by Gabriel Rimachi Sialer and Carlos Sotomayor), Lima, Editorial Casatomada, 2012.
- El cuento peruano 2001–2010 (selection and introduction by Ricardo González Vigil), Lima: Copé, 2013.
- Denominación de origen Perú. Antología de cuento (selection and introduction by Miguel Ángel Manrique), Bogotá, Taller de Edición Rocca, 2014.
- El fin de algo. Antología del nuevo cuento peruano 2001–2015 (selection and introduction by Víctor Ruíz Velazco), Lima, Santuario Editorial, 2015.
- King : tributo al Rey del Terror (compilation by Jorge Luis Cáceres), Buenos Aires: Interzona Editora y La Biblioteca de Babel, 2015.
- Estados Hispanos de América. Narrativa latinoamericana made in USA (selection and introduction by Antonio Díaz Oliva), New York: Sudaquia, 2016.
- Pasajes de lo fantástico. Antología de relatos de expresión fantástica en el Perú (selection and introduction by Audrey Louyer), Lima, Maquinaciones, 2017.
- King. Tributo al rey del terror (compilation by Jorge Luis Cáceres), Lima, Editorial Casatomada, 2018.
- Universos en expansión. Antología crítica de la ciencia ficción peruana: siglo XIX–XXI (selection and introduction by José Güich), Lima, Universidad de Lima, 2018.
- Cuentos de ida y vuelta. 17 narradores peruanos en Estados Unidos (selection and introduction by Luis Hernán Castañeda and Carlos Villacorta), Lima, PEISA, 2019.
- Noticias del futuro. Antología del cuento de ciencia ficción peruano del siglo XXI (selection and introduction by Elton Honores), Lima, Altazor, 2019.
- Incurables. Relatos de dolencias y males (selection and introduction by Oswaldo Estrada), Chicago: Ars Communitas, 2020.
- Cuentos peruanos de la pandemia (selection and introduction by Ricardo González Vigil), Lima: Mascapaycha, 2021.
- Vislumbra: muestra de cuentos peruanos de fantasía (selection and introduction by Carlos Enrique Saldivar), Lima: Torre de papel, 2021.
- Fin: Antología de relatos escatológicos iberoamericanos (selection and introduction by Cristina Mondragón), Valladolid: Universidad de Valladolid, 2022.
- Paciencia perdida. An Anthology of Peruvian Fiction (selection, translation, and introduction by Gabriel T. Saxton-Ruiz), Dallas: Dulzorada, 2022.
- El tiempo es nuestro. Cuentos peruanos post-2000 (selection and introduction by Víctor Ruiz Velasco), Lima: Seix Barral, 2023.
