= Paula Lapido =

Spanish writer (born 1975)

Paula Lapido is a Spanish writer born in Madrid in 1975.

Her short stories collection Teoría del todo was runner up for the Setenil Award for the best short stories collection in 2010. Her novel Los que alcanzan la orilla was the winner in 2019 in the competition Kutxa Ciudad de Irun for the best novel written in Spanish.

== Publications ==
- Teoría de todo (2010)
- Horror vacui (2014)
- Los que alcanzan la orilla (2019)

=== Anthologies ===
- Cosecha Eñe 2009 (2009)
- Mi madre es un pez (2011)
- PervertiDos (2012)
- Náufragos en San Borondón (2012)
- No entren al 1408, a tribute to Stephen King.
