= Juan Jacinto Muñoz Rengel =

Spanish writer (born 1974)

Juan Jacinto Muñoz-Rengel
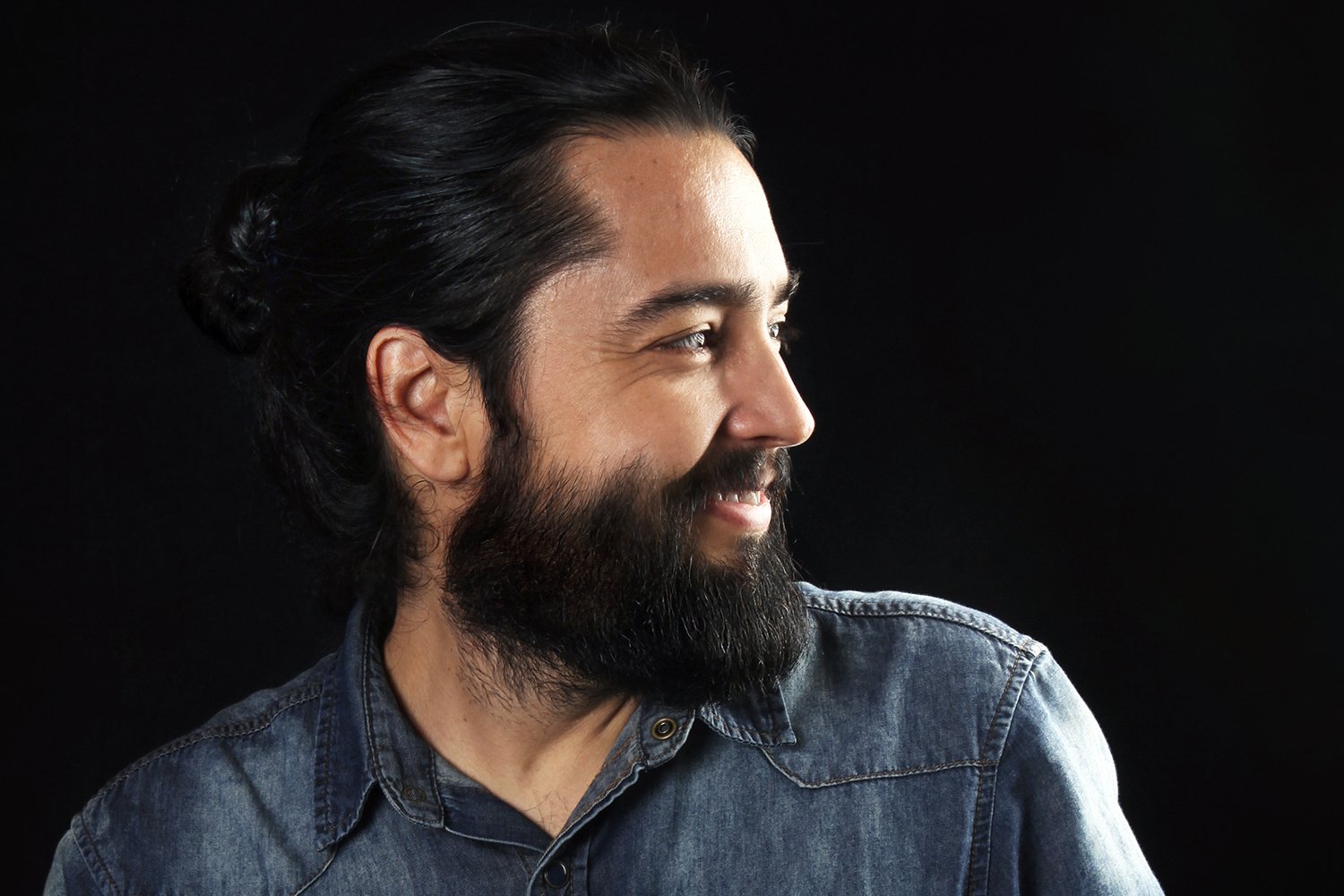
- Born: January 16, 1974 (age 52); Málaga, Spain
- Occupation: Writer
- Website: www.juanjacintomunozrengel.com

Juan Jacinto Muñoz-Rengel (born 1974, in Málaga, Spain) is a Spanish writer. He studied philosophy and is the author of the essay 'A History of Lying'. He's also well known in his native country for his short stories and his novels, including El asesino hipocondríaco (The Hypochondriac Hitman) and El gran imaginador (The Great Imaginator, 2017 Celsius Festival National Book Award). His work has been translated into English, French, Italian, Finnish, Greek, Romanian, Russian, Arabic, and Turkish, and published in more than twenty-five countries.

== Biography ==
Muñoz-Rengel obtained his doctorate in Philosophy, and has taught in both Spain and the UK. He is also a frequent contributor to the Spanish newspaper El País and Spanish National Radio. At present, he runs the Escuela de Imaginadores in Madrid.

He is the author of the novels El gran imaginador (The Great Imaginator) (Penguin Random House, 2016), El asesino hipocondríaco (The Hypochondriac Hitman) (Penguin Random House, 2012) and El sueño del otro (The Other's Dream) (Penguin Random House, 2013), as well as various collections of short stories: 88 Mill Lane (2006), De mecánica y alquimia (2009), Ignotus Best Short Story Collection Award, and El libro de los pequeños milagros (2013). His work has appeared in major anthologies including Pequeñas resistencias (Ed. Andrés Neuman, 2010), Siglo XXI (2010) and Cuento español actual (2014).

He was short-listed for the Clarín Alfaguara Novel Award, Argentina's most prestigious international literary prize, of which José Saramago was president of the jury, for the novel El asesino hipocondríaco.

He has been recognized by critics as one of the major renewers of the fantastic and speculative tradition, and the international press has compared him to Jorge Luis Borges, Italo Calvino and Stanisław Lem.

== Works ==
His first book, 88 Mill Lane, is a selection of fantasy stories set in London. His second book of short stories, De mecánica y alquimia, Premio Ignotus Award for Best Short Story Collection and short-listed for the Setenil Award for best short story collection, broadens its settings to all Europe, from the 11th century to the future. He has twice won the La Felguera Short Stories Competition, one of the most important awards for Spanish fiction.

He coordinated and prefaced the short story anthologies La realidad quebradiza, Perturbaciones and Ficción Sur.

His novel El asesino hipocondríaco is a crime fiction parody, with appearances of Poe, Proust, Voltaire, Tolstoy, Molière, and other famous hypochondriacs in the history of literature and philosophy. A Paris Match (France) critic said, "Hilarious. Irresistible... "The Hypochondriac Hitman is much more than just a simple crime novel, it's a true lesson in philosophy." El Mundo (Spain) said, "With his novel Muñoz Rengel gives us an assassin whose murders it is possible to enjoy." Livres-Hebdo (France) called it "A delightful comedy." The book is a best-seller in Spain and the publication rights have been sold in over 10 countries, including France, Italy, Finland, Mexico, Canada, Turkey, Argentina, Uruguay, Chile and Arab countries.

== Bibliography ==
- El gran imaginador, Penguin Random House, 2016, ISBN 978-84-0101-748-3.
- El sueño del otro, Penguin Random House, 2014, ISBN 978-84-9032-709-8.
- El asesino hipocondríaco, Penguin Random House, 2012, ISBN 978-84-01-35225-6 (1st edition 19 January 2012; 2nd edition 10 February 2012; 3rd edition 20 March 2012; 4th edition 18 April 2012; 5th edition January 2013; 6th edition March 2013; 7th edition April 2013).
- El libro de los pequeños milagros, Páginas de Espuma, 2013, ISBN 978-84-8393-146-2.
- De mecánica y alquimia, Salto de Página Editors, 2009, ISBN 978-84-936354-9-7.
- 88 Mill Lane , Alhulia Editors, 2005, ISBN 978-84-96083-85-1.
- La realidad quebradiza (Anthology; Ed. by Juan Jacinto Muñoz Rengel), Páginas de Espuma, 2012, ISBN 978-84-8393-099-1.
- Perturbaciones (Anthology; Ed. by Juan Jacinto Muñoz Rengel), Salto de Página Editors, 2009, ISBN 978-84-936354-6-6.
- Ficción sur (Anthology; Ed. by Juan Jacinto Muñoz Rengel), Traspiés Editors, 2008, ISBN 978-84-935427-6-4.

== Anthologies ==
- Las otras. Antología de mujeres artificiales, (Ed. Teresa López-Pellisa), McNally Jackson, New York, USA, 2016.
- Simbiosis: Antología de ciencia ficción hispana (Ed. Carlos Gámez), La Pereza, Miami, USA, 2016, ISBN 978-0692809839.
- Historia y antología de la ciencia ficción española (Ed. Julián Díez & Fernando Ángel Moreno), Cátedra, 2014, ISBN 978-84-376-3337-4.
- Mañana todavía. Doce distopías para el siglo XXI (Ed. Ricard Ruiz Garzón), Penguin Random House, 2014, ISBN 978-84-15-83131-0.
- Visionarias / Visionaries (Ed. Alberto Chimal), Traviesa, Cornell, New York, USA, 2014, bilingual edition.
- Cuento español actual (1992-2012) (Ed. Ángeles Encinar), Cátedra, 2014, ISBN 978-84-376-3220-9.
- Mar de pirañas. Nuevas voces del microrrelato español (Ed. Fernando Valls), Menoscuarto, 2012, ISBN 978-84-96675-89-6.
- Prospectivas. Antología de ciencia ficción española actual (Ed. Fernando Ángel Moreno), Salto de Página, 2012, ISBN 978-84-15-06531-9.
- Steampunk: antología retrofuturista (Ed. Félix J. Palma), Nevsky, 2012, ISBN 978-84-939379-3-5.
- Pequeñas Resistencias 5. Antología del nuevo cuento español (Ed. Andrés Neuman), Páginas de Espuma, 2010, ISBN 978-84-8393-069-4.
- Siglo XXI. Los nuevos nombres del cuento español (Ed. Fernando Valls & Gemma Pellicer), Menoscuarto, 2010, ISBN 978-84-96675-48-3.
- Cuento vivo de Andalucía, University of Guadalajara, Mexico, 2006.
- Relatos para Leer en el Autobús (preface by Andrés Neuman), Cuadernos del Vigía, 2006, ISBN 978-84-95430-23-6.
