= Carlos Yushimito =

Peruvian writer of Japanese descent (born 1977)

Carlos Yushimito del Valle
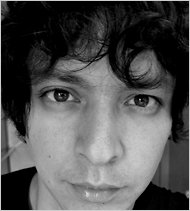
- Carlos Yushimito, September, 2010
- Born: 1977 (age 48–49); Lima, Peru
- Education: National University of San Marcos, Villanova University, Brown University
- Website: www.carlosyushimito.com

Carlos Yushimito del Valle (born 1977 in Lima, Peru) is a Peruvian writer of Japanese descent.

== Biography ==
Carlos Yushimito del Valle studied Latin American Literature at the National University of San Marcos where he graduated in 2002. Two years later he published his first short stories collection, El Mago (The Magician), and in 2006 his second book, Las Islas (Islands), was warmly received by the critics. Since then, his stories have appeared in several anthologies of short stories in Peru and abroad. In 2010 he was considered by the British literary magazine Granta as one of the twenty two best writers in Spanish Language under 35 years, along with authors like Santiago Roncagliolo, Andrés Neuman and Alejandro Zambra. He has been invited, among others, to Quito Book Fair, Santiago de Chile, La Paz, Guadalajara, Miami and Bogotá, Colombia International Book Fairs, to the First International Festival of Young Writers in La Habana, Cuba and to several U.S. Universities, including New York University, University of California, Los Angeles (UCLA), Tulane University, Brandeis University, San Jose State University, California, Georgetown University, Cornell University and University of California, Berkeley.

In 2011, his short stories collection Lecciones para un niño que llega tarde (Lessons for a Child who Arrived Late) was published in Barcelona, Spain, by Duomo Ediciones. His most recent works are Los bosques tienen sus propias puertas (Forests Have Their Own Doors) (Demipage, Madrid: 2014), Marginalia (Odradek, Lima: 2015) and Rizoma (Rhizome) (Perra Gráfica, La Paz: 2015).

His stories, set in favelas and sertões, are inspired by Brazil, though he has never been there. He moved to the United States in 2008, to study a MA in Hispanic Studies at Villanova University in Pennsylvania, and later to Providence, Rhode Island, where he obtained a PhD at Brown University.

His work has been translated into English, French, Italian and Portuguese. His book Lessons for a Child who Arrived Late was published by Transit Books in the US in 2017.

== Work ==
=== Books ===
- El Mago. The Magician (Lima: Sarita Cartonera, 2004; La Paz, Bolivia: Yerba Mala Cartonera, 2005)
- Las islas. Islands (Lima, [sic], 2006) ISBN 978-9972-2841-0-6
- Madureira sabe. Madureira knows (Lima: Underwood Collection, Pontificia Universidad Católica del Peru, 2007)
- Equis. X (Riobamba, Ecuador: Matapalo Cartonera, 2009)
- Cuentos: Perú-Ecuador 1998-2008. Short Stories: Peru-Ecuador 1998-2008. Anthology. Selection and preface by Gabriela Falconi and Carlos Yushimito (Lima: [sic] and Embassy of Ecuador in Peru, 2009) ISBN 978-612-45492-2-9
- Lecciones para un niño que llega tarde. (Barcelona: Duomo ediciones, 2011) ISBN 978-84-92723-91-1
- Los bosques tienen sus propias puertas. (Madrid: Demipage, 2014; Lima: Peisa, 2013)
- Marginalia. Breve repertorio de pensamientos prematuros sobre el arte poco notable de leer al revés. (Lima: Odradek, 2015)
- Rizoma. (La Paz: Perra Gráfica Taller, 2015)

=== Anthologies ===
- Enésima novísima. Nueva narrativa nacional (Lima: Ginebra Magnolia, No. 4-5, 2005)
- Nuevos lances, otros fuegos. Narradores de los últimos años (Lima: Ed. Recreo and San Marcos, 2007. Selection and introduction by Miguel Ildefonso)
- Selección peruana 1990-2007 (Lima: Editorial Estruendomudo, 2007)
- Disidentes. Muestra de la nueva narrativa peruana (Lima: Revuelta Editores, 2007. Selection and Introduction by Gabriel Ruiz-Ortega)
- El futuro no es nuestro. Narradores de América Latina nacidos entre 1970 y 1980 (electronic version). (Bogotá: Pie de Página 2008. Selection and Introduction by Diego Trelles Paz)
- Hispanophonies / Hispanofonías (Paris: Retors, No. 11, 2010. Selection and Introduction by Ivan Salinas and Mariana Martínez Salgado. Translated into French by Laure Gauze)
- Nuevas rutas. Jóvenes escritores latinoamericanos (Guatemala: Editorial Piedrasanta. Coedición Latinoamericana, 2010)
- Los mejores narradores jóvenes en Español (Barcelona, Granta Nº11, October 2010)
- The Best Young Spanish Language Novelists (London, Granta Nº113, November 2010)
- Os melhores jovens escritores em Espanhol (Brasil: Granta Nº7, Alfaguara, June 2011)
- Colección Reunida: 2007-2008 (Lima: Colección Underwood, Pontificia Universidad Católica del Perú, 2012)
- 17 Fantásticos cuentos peruanos. Antología Vol. 2 (Lima: Casa tomada, 2012. Compiled and prologued by Carlos Sotomayor and Gabriel Rimachi)
- La Ciudad Contada. Buenos Aires en la mirada de la nueva narrativa hispanoamericana (Buenos Aires: Buenos Aires Ciudad, 2012. Compiled and prologued by Maximiliano Tomas)
- The Asian American Literary Review (AALR) (Washington DC: United States, 2012. Spring, Vol 3, Issue 1. Translated into English by Sofi Hall; edited by Valerie Miles)
- Disidentes 2. Muestra de la nueva narrativa peruana (Lima: Altazor Editores, 2012. Selection and Introduction by Gabriel Ruiz-Ortega)
