= Premio de la Crítica Española =

Spanish literary award

The "Premios de la Crítica" are literary prizes awarded on a yearly basis by the Asociación Española de Críticos Literarios to the best narrative and poetic works published in Spain on the preceding year. The prizes cover all four official languages of Spain: Spanish or Castilian, Catalan, Galician, and Euskera.

There is no monetary award associated with the prizes. The awarding jury is composed of 22 members of the Associación de Criticos Literarios.

The award for narrative literature in Castilian has been won by writers including Miguel Delibes, Ana María Matute, and Javier Marías. In 2016, it was awarded to Cristina Fernández Cubas for her collection of the short stories La habitación de Nona (Nona's Room).

The categories are:

- Premio de la Crítica de narrativa castellana, created in 1956.
- Premio de la Crítica de poesía castellana, created in 1956.
- Premio de la Crítica de narrativa catalana, awarded for the first time in 1962, and the second time in 1976, acquired regular status in 1978.
- Premio de la Crítica de poesía catalana, awarded for the first time in 1962, and the second time in 1976, acquired regular status in 1978.
- Premio de la Crítica de narrativa gallega, created in 1976.
- Premio de la Crítica de poesía gallega, created in 1976.
- Premio de la Crítica de narrativa en euskera, created in 1978.
- Premio de la Crítica de poesía en euskera, created in 1978.

== General references ==
- "Premio de la Crítica". epdlp.com. Archived from the original on 13 June 2025.
