= Juan Soto Ivars =

Spanish novelist & columnist (born 1985)

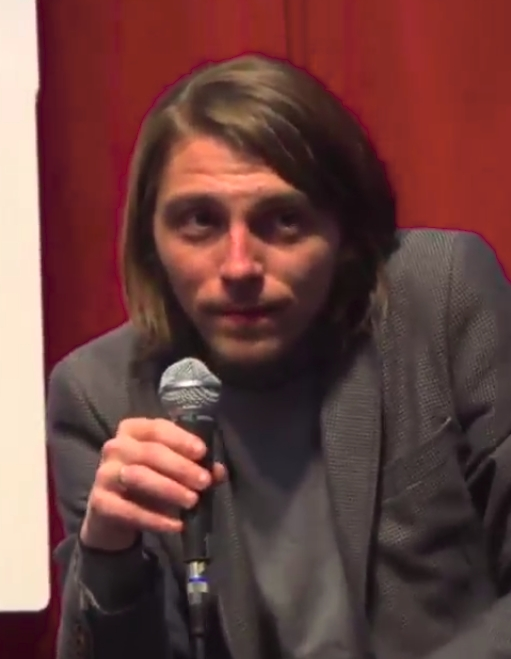
Soto Ivars on 22 March 2018

Juan Soto Ivars (1985 in Águilas) is a Spanish novelist and columnist.

He is the author of the novels Ajedrez para un detective novato (2013), Siberia (2012) and La conjetura de Perelman (2011). He co-edited the short story collection Mi madre es un pez (2011) with Sergi Bellver. He contributes regularly to Vice, Primera Línea, El Confidencial, Revista Tiempo, Ling and other magazines. For two years he was the director of the newsletter El Crítico created by Juan Carlos Suñén. In 2011 he co-founded the literary movement Nuevo Drama.

== Works ==
Novels

- Ajedrez para un detective novato (2013)
- Siberia (2012)
- La conjetura de Perelman (2011)

Books edited

- He co-edited the short story anthology Mi madre es un pez (2011) with Sergi Bellver
- Un abuelo rojo y otro abuelo facha (Círculo de Tiza, Madrid, 2016).
- Poscensura (Flash, Barcelona, 2017).
- Arden las redes (Debate, 2017).
- La casa del ahorcado (Debate, 2021).
- Nadie se va a reír (Debate, 2022).
- Knut Hamsun: el autor y las quimeras (Zut, 2022).
- Esto no existe (Debate, 2025).
