= The Blind Sunflowers (novel) =

2004 Spanish novel by Alberto Méndez

- Author: Alberto Méndez
- Language: Spanish
- Genre: Novel
- Published: 2004
- Media type: Print

The Blind Sunflowers (Spanish: Los girasoles ciegos) is a 2004 Spanish novel written by Alberto Méndez.

== Style ==
There are four parts in the book, each containing a story about the Spanish Civil War.

The Blind Sunflowers has three narratives throughout the story. One of the narrators is Lorenzo, who is remembering the past, his childhood during the aftermaths of the Spanish Civil War. Another narrator is the Priest, Brother Salvador. His narrative is more of a confessional. He writes a letter in pompous and nationalist language. He also uses Latin words, which show he has studied in the church. His narrative is an epistolary. The final one is a third-person narrative, which watches the family and fills in all the gaps.

== Summary plot ==
Lorenzo recalls his nine-year-old self, living with his mother, Elena, and father, Ricardo. Ricardo Mazo lives in the closet (as a Spanish: topo, lit. 'mole') to hide from the Nationalist police. He is a writer and is not loyal to the Nationalist Government. Ricardo only comes out when all of the windows are closed. As Lorenzo's mother drops him off at school she catches the eye of his teacher, Brother Salvador. Brother Salvador falls in an obsession with Elena. He thinks her husband, Ricardo Mazo, is dead. He believed that he is suitable for her and even considered leaving his priesthood. One day he came unannounced to their home, and tried to rape her. Ricardo came out and saved her and realized he has been caught; he jumped out the window and killed himself in order not to get in the hands of the Nationalist police.

== Characters ==
- Brother Salvador – Lorenzo's teacher, a practicing priest
- Lorenzo Mazo; Now an adult, recollects his childhood he spent during the aftermaths of the Spanish Civil War.
- Ricardo Mazo – Lorenzo's father and a writer
- Elena Mazo – Lorenzo's mother

== Symbols ==
- The closet Ricardo hides in symbolizes the hiding he has to go through physically, but also symbolizes his wife and child also hide mentally.
- The mirror on the closet symbolizes the two worlds Lorenzo lives in. Lorenzo lives in a world where his father is "dead" and has to pretend to be loyal to the church. He also lives in a world where his father is hiding in the closet.
- The lift symbolized the fear. As soon as Elena, Ricardo, and Lorenzo hear the lift move up, they all stopped and listened in fear.
- The title "Blind Sunflowers" can refer to the meaning of "those who have lost their way".

== Film adaptation ==
This novel was adapted into a film with the same name in 2008.
