= Lectura fácil =

2018 novel by Cristina Morales

- Author: Cristina Morales (writer)
- Language: Spanish
- Publisher: Anagrama
- Publication date: 2018
- Awards: Premio Herralde (2018); Spanish National Literature Prize for Narrative (2019)
- ISBN: 978-84-339-9864-4
- Preceded by: Terroristas modernos (2017)

Lectura fácil (English: Easy Read) is a novel by the Spanish author Cristina Morales published by Anagrama in 2018. The book was a critical and commercial success that received the Premio Herralde in 2018, and the Spanish National Literature Prize for Narrative in 2019. The plot revolves around four women with intellectual disabilities who live together in assisted living in Generalitat in Barcelona during the time of Ada Colau's term as mayor. The story describes the women's daily life, their economic and emotional needs, anarchist meetings, dance classes, and legal decisions.

The structure of the novel blends different textual media, from an anarchist fanzine and legal rulings to WhatsApp messages written in an easy reading style.

== Writing and publication ==
According to the author, her intention in writing this book was to "consider how the signifying and marginalization of difference has been systematized, from each member of society that does not respond to normativity". Morales originally planned to title the novel Ni amo, ni dios, ni marido, ni partido, ni de fútbol (Neither love, god, marriage, games nor soccer)—a phrase ultimately included on the book's cover—but she opted for Lectura fácil on the logic that it represented the different sections of the book in a satisfactory way.

The book was originally set to be published by Seix Barral, a publishing house that had commissioned Morales' novel. However, upon reading the book, the publishers asked Morales to edit the names and remove the more controversial portions of the text, the equivalent of eliminating hundreds of pages and entire sections of the novel, a request that Morales refused. She eventually stopped working to publish the book through Seix Barral and selected a different publisher.

== Reception ==
Lectura fácil won the Premio Herralde in 2018, with Morales becoming one of the youngest to be granted the award. Marta Sanz, who was part of the award's jury, said of the novel, "Cristina Morales challenges a canon of economic, social, political, moral, and educational norms. And she does it through chainsaw-esque stylistics that, in turn, challenge the canon of literary norms."

In October 2019, the novel won the Spanish National Literature Prize for Narrative. In its decision, the jury affirmed that it was awarding the prize "for addressing a radical and radically original proposition, that does not feature a genealogy in Spanish literature and that stands out for its recreation of orality, some extraordinary characters and its reading on the developing political context."

Carlos Pardo en El País described the book as a "milestone in the contemporary Spanish novel" and "one of the most surprising and effective realist novels from recent years." Of particular note are the use of irony as a narrative device and Morales' mastery in constructing characters that do not turn into caricatures of the novel's themes, which include fascism, sexual resistance, machismo, and the awakening of the political consciousness. Similar praise came from Nadal Suau's review in El Cultural, which referred to Morales' writing as "devastating, boundless" and commented on the uncomfortable nature of the text, which is populated with sarcasm, political incorrectness, and criticism of different political sectors.

At the end of 2019, El País ranked Lectura fácil number 43 in its list of the 100 best books of the 21st century.
