= Jeanmaire =

Jeanmaire is a French surname. Notable people with the surname include:

- Federico Jeanmaire (born 1957), Argentine writer
- Jean-Louis Jeanmaire (1910–1992), Swiss general and Soviet spy
- Zizi Jeanmaire (1924–2020), French ballet dancer, actress, and singer
