= Robert Fernández =

Robert Fernández may refer to:

- Robert Fernández (footballer) (born 1962), Spanish footballer
- Robert Fernandez (cricketer) (born 1986), Indian cricketer
- Bob Fernandez (1924–2024), American veteran from the attack on pearl harbor.
- Bob Fernandez (politician), American politician

== See also ==
- Roberto Fernández (disambiguation)
