= After the Winter (novel) =

Novel by Guadalupe Nettel

- First edition
- Author: Guadalupe Nettel
- Original title: Después del invierno
- Translator: Rosalind Harvey
- Language: Spanish
- Publisher: Editorial Anagrama
- Publication date: 2014
- Publication place: Mexico
- English publication date: 2018
- Pages: 268
- Awards: Premio Herralde (2014)
- ISBN: 978-84-339-9784-5
- OCLC: 896834878
- Dewey Decimal: 863/.7
- LC Class: PQ7298.424.E76 D47 2014

After the Winter (Spanish: Después del invierno) is a novel by the Mexican writer Guadalupe Nettel, published in 2014 by the publishing house Editorial Anagrama and winner of the prestigious Premio Herralde in its edition of the same year. The story follows Claudio, a Cuban misanthrope who lives in New York City, and Cecilia, a lonely Mexican who is doing her postgraduate studies in Paris, whose lives eventually become intertwined in a brief affair.

According to the author, the title of the novel refers to the ability of people to resurface after experiencing pain.

== Plot ==
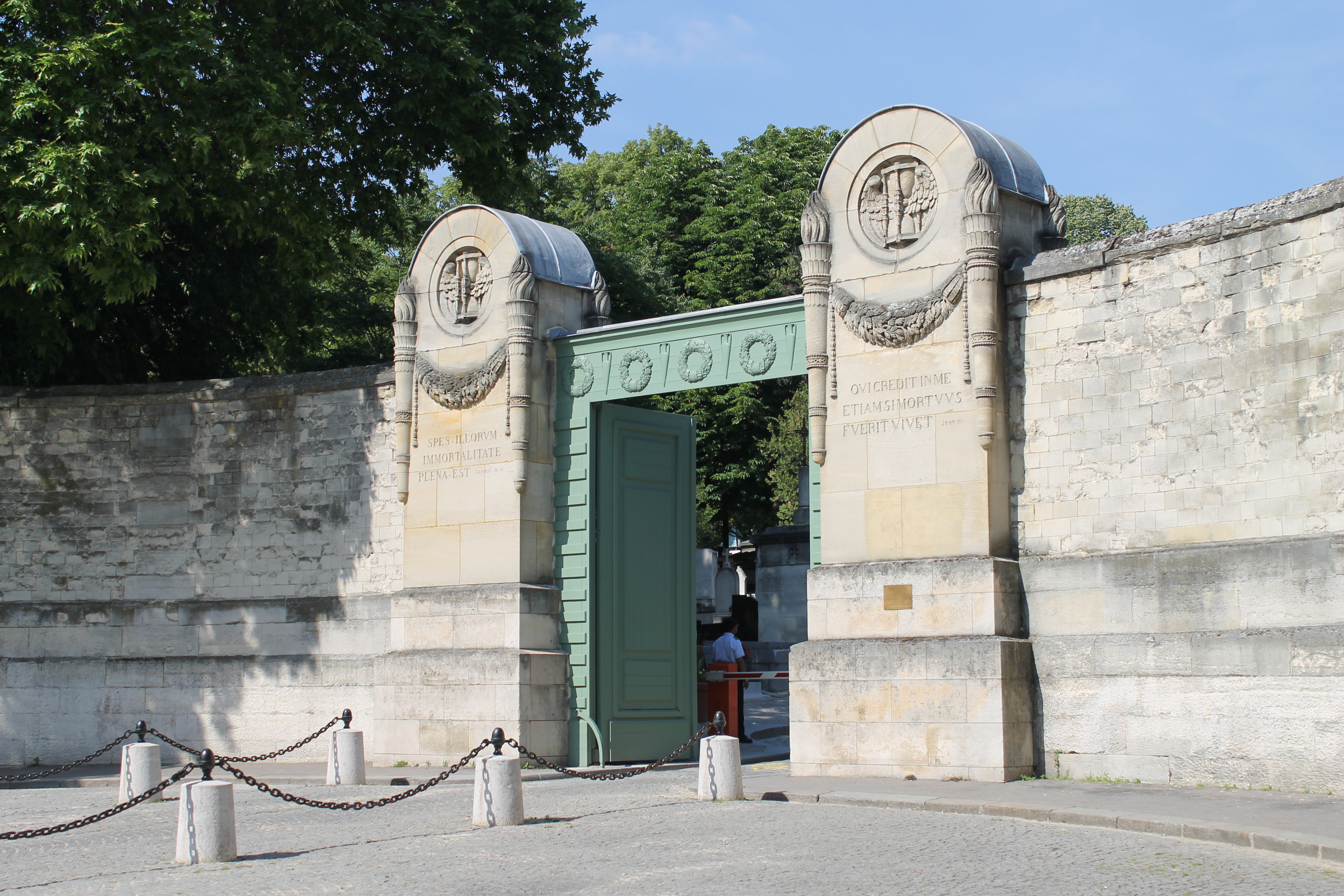
The protagonist lives in front of the Père Lachaise Cemetery.

Claudio has a comfortable life in the apartment that he bought after years of working in a publishing house and in which he does not allow any other human being to enter. His life is based on well-defined routines that allow him to make the most of his time to work, go to the gym and engage in intellectual activities that help him feel superior to the people around him. Before living in New York City he lived in Cuba, where he had had a childhood full of hardship, although he always leaned towards letters. Some time ago he had started a relationship with Ruth, an older millionaire woman who disliked him for considering her quiet and uncomplicated. Cecilia, meanwhile, is on a scholarship pursuing postgraduate studies for a Master's degree in Paris. Since she was little she had been a lonely girl with unusual hobbies, like walking through cemeteries. She currently lives in an apartment opposite the Père Lachaise Cemetery.

One day, Cecilia's neighbor, Tom, complains about the noise of her radio, which gives way to the beginning of a friendship that eventually leads them to fall in love, although they do not become lovers. Cecilia soon learns that Tom has an incurable disease and that he could only have a few years to live. One morning Tom announces that he would make a short trip to Sicily, but months go by without Cecilia hearing from him, leaving her devastated. Claudio travels with Ruth to Paris for a few days and meets Cecilia, whom he becomes obsessed with when he convinces himself that she was the woman destined to make him happy. When he returns to New York he constantly writes passionate letters, although he maintains his relationship with Ruth due to the inconvenience that revealing the truth would cause.

Claudio visits Cecilia in Paris and they start an affair. She is not as enthusiastic as Claudio, but she gets carried away. Later, she visits him in New York, where little by little she discovers Claudio's true personality. One day when Claudio does not return from work, Cecilia finds dozens of calls from Ruth in a threatening tone, as Ruth had been spying on them and knew that Cecilia was staying with him. Cecilia leaves Claudio's house, returns to Paris and decides never to answer his messages again. Claudio becomes desperate and unstable, a phase from which he only manages to resurface from by becoming addicted to athletics. He participates in several marathons, but is injured in the Boston Marathon bombing, losing a leg.

Tom returns from his trip and Cecilia realizes that she still loves him. They begin a relationship and live together for several months before Tom gets worse and ends up in the hospital. Although there were chances of being saved through a transplant, Tom's condition worsens faster than expected and he dies. Cecilia spends months in a depression, cutting off all contact with the world and leaving her studies. Claudio is forced to acclimate his new life without a leg. He gradually resigns himself to staying with Ruth, who helps him as best she can, and accepts that he will never find his idealized perfect woman. In Paris, some friends of Cecilia visit her and, seeing her condition, take her to live with them. Cecilia gradually recovers, decides to stay in Paris and finally overcomes Tom's death.

== Main characters ==
- Claudio – a misogynistic forty-something Cuban immigrant living in New York City. He hates the company of people in general and imposes rigid daily routines. His passions include robots, particularly because he wants to be more like them. He has a rich girlfriend named Ruth who he can barely put up with, although he dreams of finding an ideal woman who can really make him happy. When he meets Cecilia, he becomes convinced that she is that woman because of the order and cleanliness he finds in her apartment and becomes obsessed with her, although the relationship does not prosper. He is eventually diagnosed with obsessive–compulsive disorder.
- Cecilia – a twenty-five-year-old Mexican girl, quite lonely, who is studying for a postgraduate degree in Paris and cannot find her purpose. She lives in an apartment in front of the Père Lachaise Cemetery, where she is distracted by watching funerals. Upon arriving in Paris, it is difficult for him to adapt to the customs of the city, especially the obsession with having a perfect figure. Months later, she falls in love with her neighbor, Tom, who suffers from pulmonary arterial hypertension. When Tom's illness worsens and he becomes more dependent on Cecilia, she begins to discover in caring for Tom the purpose that she had so sought for in her life.
- Ruth – Claudio's girlfriend, described as an older, millionaire woman with a refined and submissive personality. Her calm disposition is the product of the antidepressants she takes daily since her former divorce, and which Claudio praises as "the recipe for the right woman for my temperament". When she finds out about Claudio and Cecilia's relationship, she suffers a nervous breakdown and threatens to commit suicide.
- Tom – Cecilia's Italian neighbor, with whom she begins a relationship. He works in a bookstore and is an excellent cook. He suffers from pulmonary arterial hypertension, a disease that puts him in a hospital, where he waits unsuccessfully for a transplant.

== Writing ==
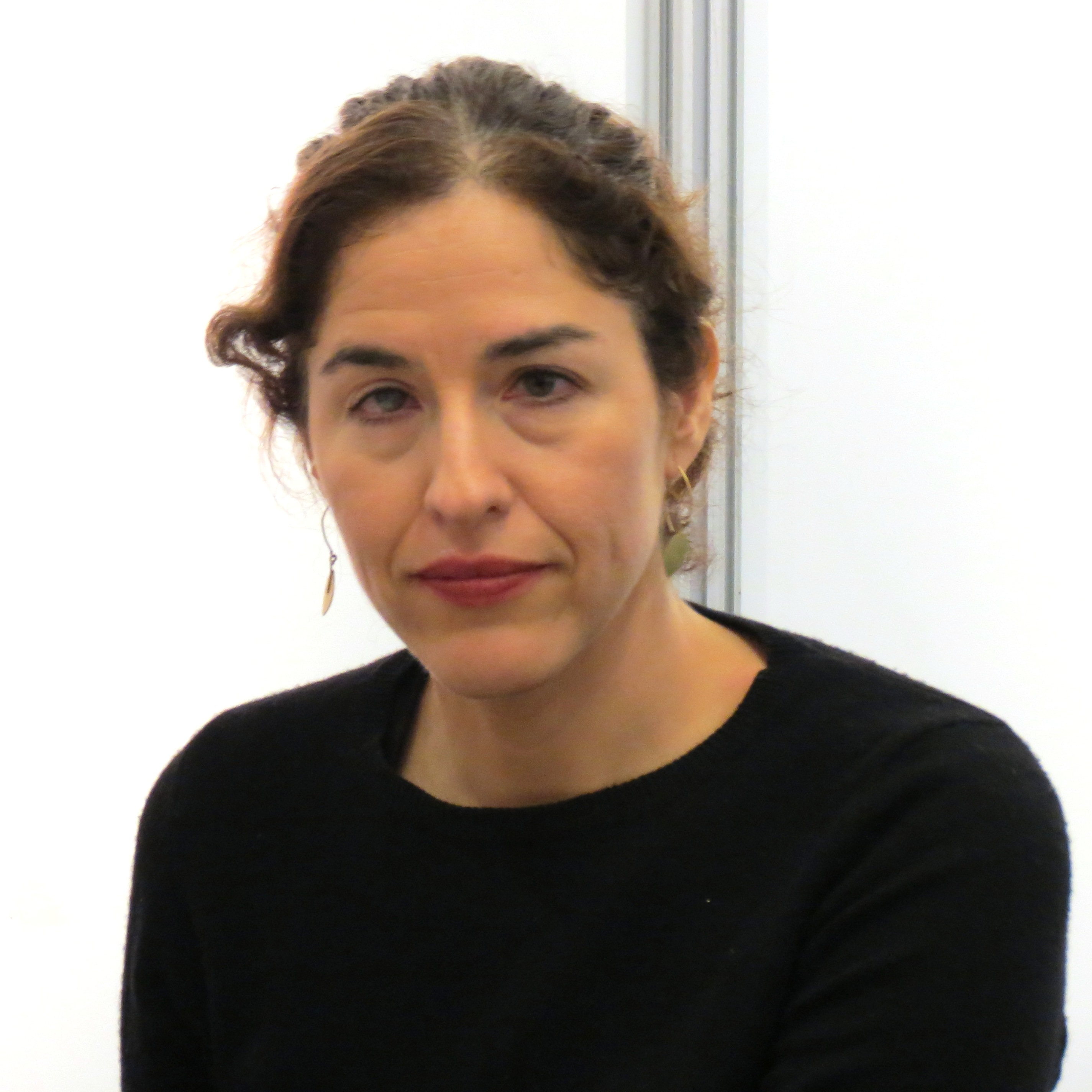
Guadalupe Nettel in 2015.

The novel took Nettel ten years to write. During that time, Nettel took breaks to write and publish two additional books: the novel El cuerpo en que nací (2011) and the short story collection Natural Histories (2013). Nettel said that developing the narrative voices of the two protagonists, with their own tone and characteristics, was one of the aspects that took the longest, in particular, differentiating Cecilia's voice from her own.

To create various characteristics of Claudio's personality, such as his arrogance and misogyny, Nettel was inspired by Arthur Schopenhauer's aphorisms about love and women. Her intention with Claudio was to create a character who "ridiculed" himself without noticing. For the character of Cecilia, on the other hand, it was based on Nettel's own experiences, such as the years she lived in Paris and the loneliness she experienced at that time, as well as her fascination with cemeteries and the loss of a loved one due to pulmonary arterial hypertension. Nettel also used her own personal diaries from her time in Paris.

The novel is told in a first-person narrative and alternates narrators in each chapter between Claudio and Cecilia.

== Reception ==
After the Winter won the 2014 edition of the Premio Herralde de Novela, out of 1,462 participating works. It was submitted by Nettel to the contest under the title "Spleen" and the pseudonym "B. Parker". Carlos Zanón, of the Spanish newspaper El País, praised the novel, especially the depth of the characters, and asserted that it cemented Nettel's position as "a new sensation of Latin American letters." These characteristics were also highlighted by El Periódico de Catalunya, who described the book as "a tragically gentle, choral and kaleidoscopic novel that seeks to give a resolution to the insoluble tragedy of living in the form of an antidote against the omnipresence of nothingness." Nadal Suau, of El Cultural, criticized the novel, stating that it was "overrun with clichés" and that the characters were not convincing enough.

The English edition of the novel was also mostly well-received. The review by Kirkus Reviews called it "a compassionately written portrait of urban loneliness and the human impulse to belong", while Publishers Weekly described it as a "sharp, potent novel depicts how even the briefest relationship can affect the rest of a life." Callum Angus, writing for the Los Angeles Review of Books, particularly highlighted the way Nettel explored death, loss, and the effects of suffering on the protagonists' physical health. The author's psychological development of the characters was called "impressive" by Ruth McKee in her review for The Irish Times, although she referred to the language as "missing its heart."

In a more negative review for the literary magazine Cleaver, Robert Sorrell criticized Nettel's portrayal of the protagonists' mental health and claimed that in the first half of the book they had the impression of being "cartoon characters" due to their "exaggerated" behaviors.
