= Maranatha =

Aramaic phrase

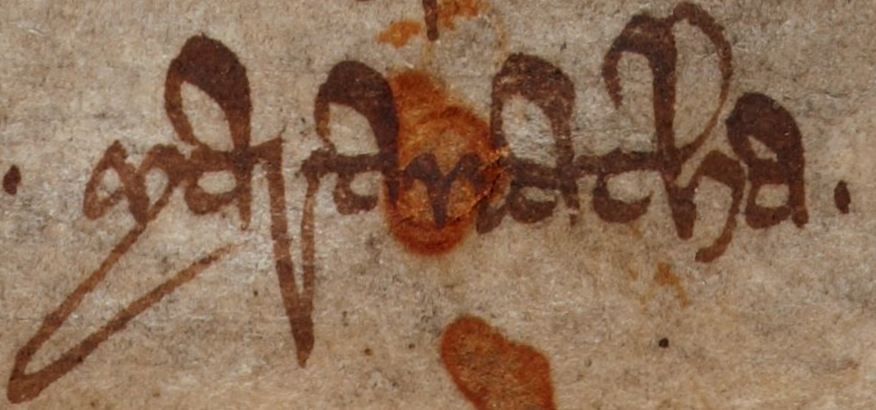
A mention of "maranatha" in the Southwick Codex, a medieval manuscript

Maranatha (Aramaic: מרנאתא) is an Aramaic phrase which occurs once in the New Testament (1 Corinthians 16:22). It also appears in Didache 10:14. It is transliterated into Greek letters rather than translated and, given the nature of early manuscripts, the lexical difficulty rests in determining just which two Aramaic words constitute the single Greek expression.

== Translations and use ==
The NRSV of 1 Corinthians 16:22 translates the expression as: "Our Lord, come!" but notes that it could also be translated as: "Our Lord has come”; the NIV translates: "Come, O Lord"; the Message version paraphrases it as: "Make room for the Master!" This expression is also alluded to in Revelation 22:20: "He which testifieth these things saith, Surely I come quickly. Amen. Even so, come, Lord Jesus."

In the Catechism of the Catholic Church, "Maranatha" was translated as "Come, Lord!".

In the Latin Church, the word "Maranatha" has been used as a solemn formula of excommunication (alongside "anathema").

== Use in contemplative prayer ==
Based on the teachings of John Cassian, John Main recommended the recitation of Maranatha as "the ideal Christian mantra", meaning "Come Lord", repeated silently interiorly as four equally stressed syllables Ma-ra-na-tha: "Not only is this one of the most ancient Christian prayers, in the language Jesus spoke, but it also has a harmonic quality that helps to bring the mind to silence. Other words or short phrases could be used but he saw it as important that during the meditation one doesn't think about the meaning or use the imagination." Other Christian authors and communities cultivate similar practices centred on this recitation, such as Pablo d'Ors, who also recommends it as one of the linkages (along with the breathing and the hands) for the practice of contemplative prayer.

== See also ==
- Language of Jesus § Maranatha (Μαραναθά)

== Bibliography ==
- Black, Matthew. "The Maranatha Invocation and Jude 14,15 (1 Enoch 1:9)." In Christ and Spirit in the New Testament: Studies in Honour of Charles Franscis Digby Moule, edited by Barnabas Lindars and Stepehn S. Smalley. 189-196. Cambridge: Cambridge University Press, 1973.
- Hengel, Martin. "Abba, Maranatha, Hosanna und die Anfänge der Christologie." In Denkwürdiges Geheimnis: Beiträge zur Gotteslehre: Festschrift für Eberhard Jüngel zum 70 Geburtstag, edited by Hrsg. v. Ingolf U. Dalferth, Johannes Fischer, and Hans-Peter Großhans. 145-183. Tübingen: Mohr Siebeck, 2004.
- Johnson, Christopher D.L. Authority and Tradition in Contemporary Understandings of Hesychasm and the Jesus Prayer, Edinburgh PhD thesis, 2009. In print under ISBN 9781441125477.
- Moreau, Jean-Claude. "Maranatha." Revue Biblique 118.1 (2011): 51-75.
- Moule, C.F.D. "Reconsideration of the Context of Maranatha." New Testament Studies 6.4 (1960): 307-310.
