= Cristina Morales (writer) =

Spanish writer (born 1985)

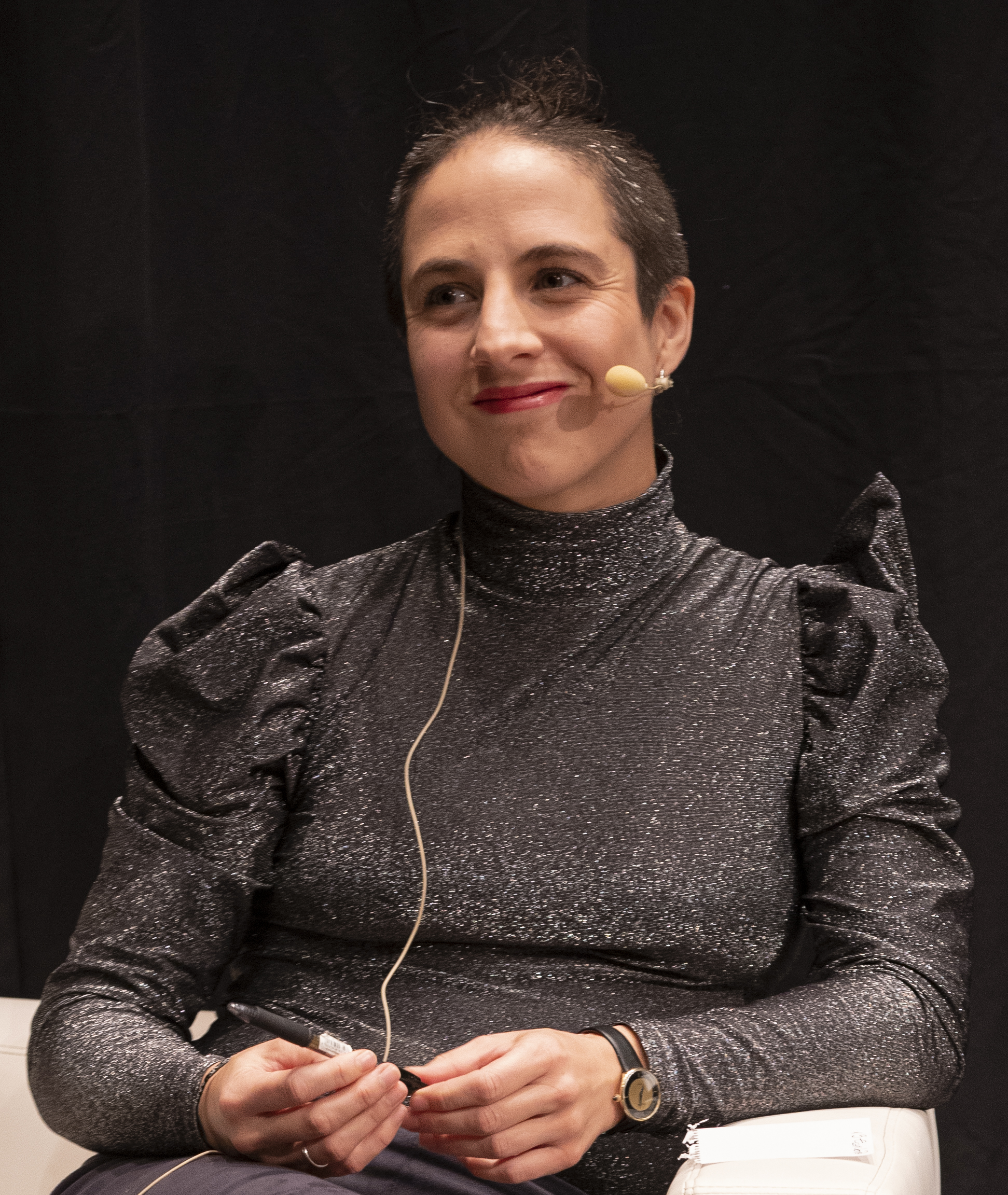
- Born: Cristina García Morales; 1985 (age 40–41); Granada, Spain
- Education: Bachelor's of political science, University of Granada
- Occupations: Writer, legal interpreter
- Notable work: Lectura fácil
- Awards: Premio Herralde (2018); Spain's National Literature Prize for Narrative (2019)

Cristina García Morales, better known as Cristina Morales (Granada, 1985) is a Spanish writer who is considered by some critics to be one of the most talented young literary writers. One of her best-known works is Lectura fácil (Easy Read) whose protagonists are four women with intellectual disabilities living in Barcelona. The novel won the Premio Herralde in 2018 and the Spanish National Literature Prize for Narrative in 2019. In 2021, she was named by Granta magazine as one of the best young writers in the Spanish language.

== Career ==
Morales has a bachelor's degree in political science from the University of Granada, works as a legal interpreter, and now lives in Barcelona. In 2002 and again in 2006, she won the Contest for Andalusian Novel Writers (Spanish: Certamen Andaluz de Eecritores Noveles) in the categories of short story and novella, respectively. In 2007, she was awarded a grant as an artist in residence at the Antonio Gala Foundation in Cordoba. She has worked as a playwright for the University of Granada and for the young creators' festival Eutopía (Festival de Jóvenes Creadores).

=== Early work ===
In 2008, Morales published the short story collection La merienda de las niñas and, five years later, she published her first novel Los combatientes, for which she won the Injuve Prize for Best Novel (Spanish: Premio Injuve de Novela). In 2015, she was a finalist for the Francesc Candel prize with the short story El hombre de los buzones (English: The Mailbox Man).

=== Malas palabras and reclaiming Teresa of Ávila ===
Also in 2015, Morales published Malas palabras (English: Bad Words), a commission from the publisher Lumen on the occasion of its five-hundredth anniversary. Morales accepted the task of inhabiting the voice of Teresa of Ávila to write the story in the first person, from the perspective of Santa Teresa herself. Morales recreated a supposed diary entry written by Saint Teresa in 1562, during the period in which this author from the Spanish Golden Age wrote Libro de la vida. Morales reclaimed the figure of Saint Teresa from the perspective of the saint as a human being, writing:

She was the first woman who dared to accuse men of clipping women's wings. She should have been rehabilitated by more radical anarco-feminists. Theresa de Jesús eclipses me. The government or any politician should be shamed into rehabilitating her and few will grant that she was a feminist ... She was a leader of the Counter-Reformation, but was put in a corner and was neutralized. We have not studied her humanistically. A task that, indeed, has been done with her contemporary San Juan de la Cruz.

Moreover, according to Morales, this story remains an injustice for women:

Woolf and Munro and Santa Teresa de Jesús fought for their own rooms, indeed, but this fight is still relevant. They asked why a woman would want nothing of their own, nothing private. We women fight not to work ten hours a day for 800 euros per month. Only a writer who is powerful, or who finds herself subject to the tyranny of the working world, or what she holds, can be allowed to enjoy a room of her own.

— Cristina García Morales. Ellos publican mucho, ellas innovan más

=== Terroristas modernos ===
In 2017, under the grant for a master's degree in literary creation III Beca Han Nefkens from Pompeu Fabra University in Barcelona, she published Terroristas modernos, a novel in which she reassumes the historical perspective of Malas palabras, narrating the so-called "triangle conspiracy," a foiled uprising against King Ferdinand VII in 1816, which was a plot by the Masons carried out by scholars in exile, participants in the creation of the 1812 constitution (Doceañistas) and heroes from the guerrilla war. Altogether, this invited a comparison with today's politics: terrorism, state violence, manipulation of the press, or the volatility of the concept of the nation, of outraged citizens. Morales explains that "Modern democracy is an act of terrorism against the governed and the territory they occupy. It is the most refined mechanism of control of all. The violent machine that is the State inside its borders and beyond is the most refined that human society has ever known. From the end of the 17th century to our time it has been perfected."

=== Lectura fácil ===
In 2018, Morales published the novel Lectura fácil, which takes its title from the term easy read, used to denote the combination of adaptations that should be made to facilitate reading and comprehension for those who struggle with these skills—the intellectually disabled, immigrants, etc.

The novel tells the story of four women with intellectual disabilities who live together in assisted living in Barcelona. The protagonists deal with various forms of social control. "... Marga, Nati, Patricia, and Àngels with family ties and common origins, with varying levels of intellectual disability [who] share an assisted living situation in a mixed and oppressive Barcelona, against a backdrop of unemployment, eviction, lies, squatters, the Platform for People Affected by Mortgages, and popular associations." The author reclaims people who are administratively designated as intellectually disabled or with functional diversity.

The novel won the Premio Herralde prize in 2018 and the National Literature Prize for Narrative in 2019.

== Other projects ==
Since 2017, Morales has been part of a contemporary feminist dance group, Iniciativa Sexual Femenina.

In 2020, Morales appeared as a producer on the album La Resaca de Los Muertos by the punk group AT-ASKO.

== Works ==
=== Novels ===
- Los combatientes (2013)
- Malas palabras (2015), republished in 2020 as an introduction to Teresa de Ávila
- Terroristas modernos (2017)
- Lectura fácil (2018)

=== Short stories ===
- La merienda de las niñas (2008)

== Awards ==
- 2002 Certamen Andaluz de Escritores Noveles for short story
- 2006 Certamen Andaluz de Escritores Noveles for short novel
- 2007 Beca en la Fundación Antonio Gala para Jóvenes Creadores (Córdoba)
- 2013 Premio Injuve de Novela for Los combatientes
- 2018 Premio Herralde de Novela for Lectura fácil
- 2019 Premio Nacional de Narrativa for Lectura fácil
