= Emilia Bertolé =

Argentine poet and painter

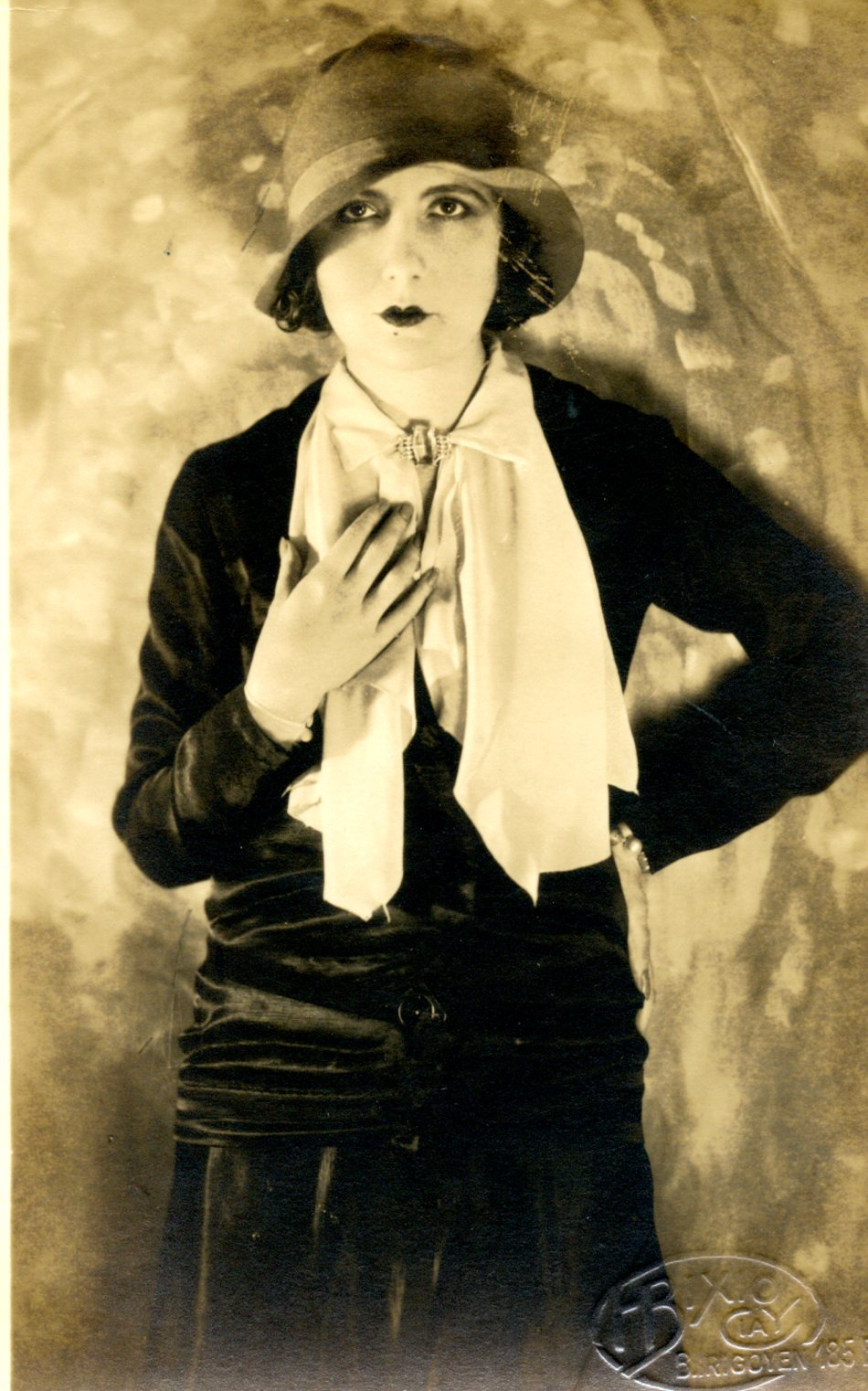
- Bertolé, c. 1920
- Born: 1896; Rosario, Argentina
- Died: 1949 (aged 52–53); Rosario, Argentina
- Education: Institute of Fine Arts "Doménico Morelli"
- Occupation: painter

Emilia Bertolé (1896–1949) was an Argentine poet and painter.

== Life ==
Bertolé was born in Rosario on 21 June 1896. She studied with the Italian teacher Mateo Casella at the Institute of Fine Arts "Doménico Morelli". She continued her painting and in 1912 she joined an exhibition with Erminio Blotta, Alfredo Guido, Manuel Musto, César Caggiano, Gustavo Cochet.

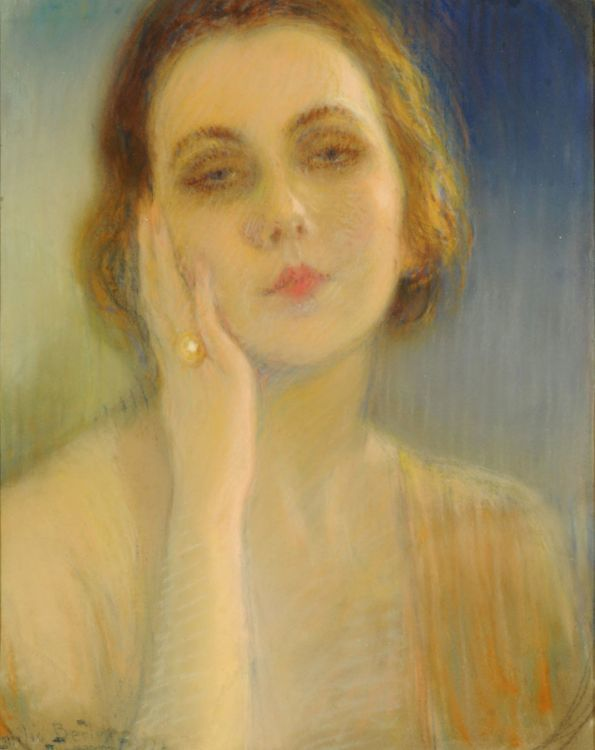
Self portrait

In 1927 she was the first woman to have her painting exhibited at the May Salon of the Santa Fe Museum "Rosa Galisteo Rodriguez". Her painting "Clarity" was of a woman looking thoughtful and it was bought by the museum.

In 1929 Bertolé created three portraits of ex-President Hipólito Yrigoyen.

The Uruguayan writer, Horacio Quiroga, led the Anaconda group and Bertolé became a member together with Ana Weiss de Rossi, Amparo de Hieken, Ricardo Hicken, Berta Singerman and Alfonsina Storni.

In 1927 her only poetry book, Shadow Mirror, was published. She prepared another book but it was not published in her lifetime.

She illustrated the covers of the magazines El Hogar y Sintonía.

== Death and legacy ==
She died in her home town in 1949. In 2006, her poetic and pictorial work, was published and this included previously unpublished poetry. a portrait gallery and it reprinted Shadow Mirror. The book was introduced by Nora Avaro and included a discussion of her sculpture work by Rafael Sender. The Oxford Encyclopedia of Women in World History notes her contribution to history.

Bertolé died in Rosario in 1949.
