= Jorge Ordaz =

Spanish writer and geologist (born 1946)

Jorge Ordaz Gargallo (born 1946) is a Spanish writer and geologist. Born in Barcelona, he lived and taught for many years at the University of Oviedo. As a fiction writer, he is best known for his novels Prima Donna, which was nominated for the Premio Herralde, and La perla del Oriente, nominated for the Premio Nadal.
