= Justo Navarro =

Spanish poet and novelist

Justo Navarro Velilla (born 1953) is a Spanish poet and novelist. He was born in Granada, and is a graduate of Granada University. He has published half a dozen novels including Accidentes íntimos, which won the Premio Herralde de Novela, and La casa del padre (1994), winner of the Premio Andalucía de la Crítica. He won the same prize again with his detective novel Gran Granada (2016). He is also a highly regarded poet, having won the Premio de la Crítica for his collection Un aviador prevé su muerte. As a translator, he has translated English language writers such as T.S. Eliot, F. Scott Fitzgerald, Virginia Woolf and Paul Auster.
