= Teresa Ruiz Rosas =

Peruvian writer and translator (born 1956)

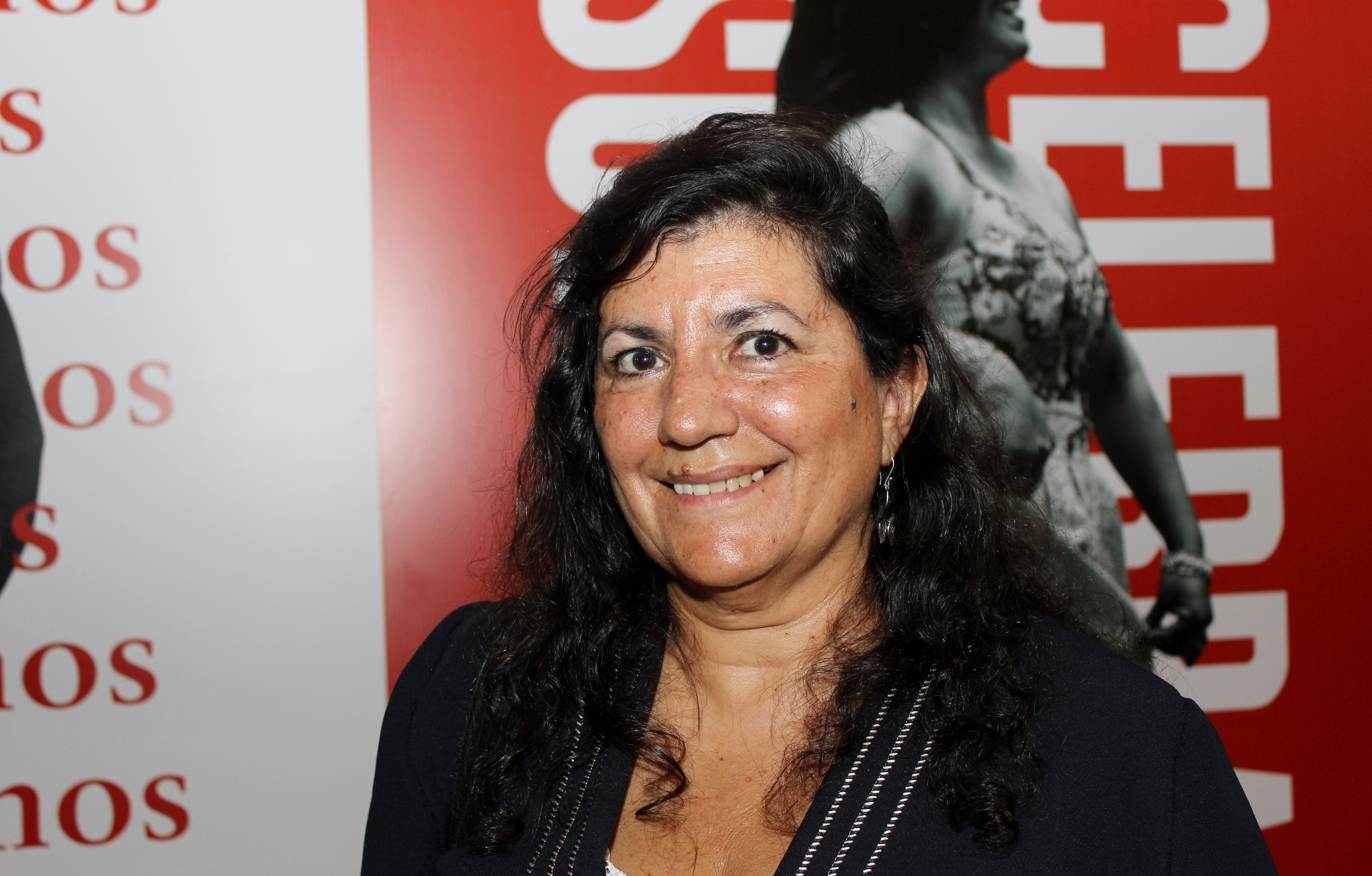
- Teresa Ruiz Rosas at the 2018 Santiago International Book Fair

Teresa Ruiz Rosas (born 1956) is a Peruvian writer and translator. She was born in Arequipa and was educated in Arequipa, Budapest, Barcelona and Freiburg. Her debut novel El copista was nominated for the 1994 Premio Herralde. She was also a nominee for the 1999 Premio Juan Rulfo for short stories.

Ruiz Rosas lives in Cologne where, besides writing, she also translates German literature and Hungarian literature into Spanish.
