= Miguel Sánchez-Ostiz =

Spanish writer (born 1950)

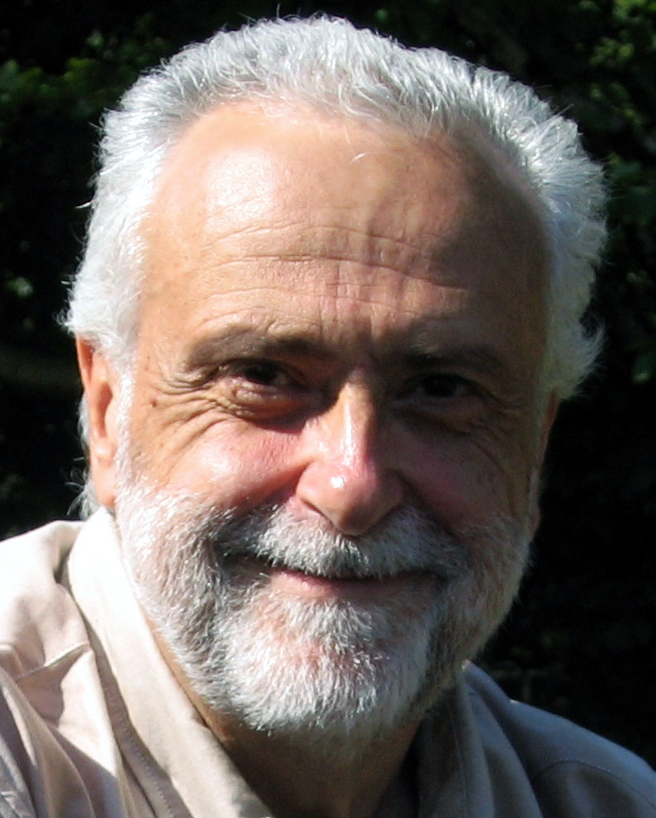
Miguel Sánchez-Ostiz

Miguel Sánchez-Ostiz (born 1950) is a Spanish writer. He has published more than 50 books in a variety of genres, including fiction, poetry, travel and literary criticism. He is an acknowledged expert on the life and work of Pio Baroja. Among his major novels are La gran ilusión (winner of the Premio Herralde de novela 1989) and No existe tal lugar which won the Premio de la Crítica de narrativa castellana in 1998.
