= Alejandro Gándara =

Spanish writer

Alejandro Gándara (born 1957) is a Spanish writer. Born in Santander, Cantabria, Gandara studied political science and sociology at Complutense University in Madrid, where he also now teaches. He won the Premio Ignacio Aldecoa for short stories in 1979, and published his first novel La media distancia in 1984. He has published more than a dozen volumes of fiction and non-fiction, and his work has been translated into English, German and Italian among other languages.

Gandara won the Premio Nadal for his novel Ciegas esperanzas and the Premio Herralde for Últimas noticias de nuestro mundo. He is a regular contributor to newspapers and magazines, including El País and El Mundo.
