= El mundo (novel) =

2007 novel by Juan José Millás

- Author: Juan José Millás
- Language: Spanish
- Genre: autobiographical novel
- Publisher: Planeta
- Publication date: 2007
- Publication place: Spain
- Pages: 233
- ISBN: 9788408075967

El mundo (lit. 'The World') is a 2007 autobiographical novel by the Spanish writer Juan José Millás. It is inspired by childhood memories and is about a boy who lives on the street and tries to grasp the history of the world.

The book received the 2007 Premio Planeta de Novela after Millás had submitted it under the pseudonym Tiresias and with the fake title A ciegas. It received the National Literature Prize for Narrative in 2008.
