= Premio de Narrativa Breve Ribera del Duero =

Spanish-language literary award

The Premio de Narrativa Breve Ribera del Duero is a bi-annual Spanish-language literary award for a short story collection. The award amount is €25,000. The award is open to authors of any nationality writing in Spanish. The award was established in 2008 by the Consejo Regulador de la Denominación de Origen Ribera del Duero (Regulating Council of the Ribera del Duero), a region in Spain.

== Winners ==
- 2009 Javier Sáez de Ibarra (Spain) for Mirar al agua, cuentos plásticos
- 2011 Marcos Giralt Torrente (Spain) for El final del amor
- 2013 Guadalupe Nettel (Mexico) for El matrimonio de los peces rojos
- 2015 Samanta Schweblin (Argentina) for Siete casas vacías
- 2017 Antonio Ortuño (Mexico) for La vaga ambición
- 2020 Marcelo Luján (Argentina) for La claridad
- 2022 Liliana Colanzi (Bolivia) for Ustedes brillan en lo oscuro
- 2024 Magalí Etchebarne (Argentina) for La vida por delante
- 2026 Sofía Balbuena (Argentina) for Personaje secundario
