= Luis Mateo Díez =

Spanish writer (born 1942)

The Most Excellent Luis Mateo Díez
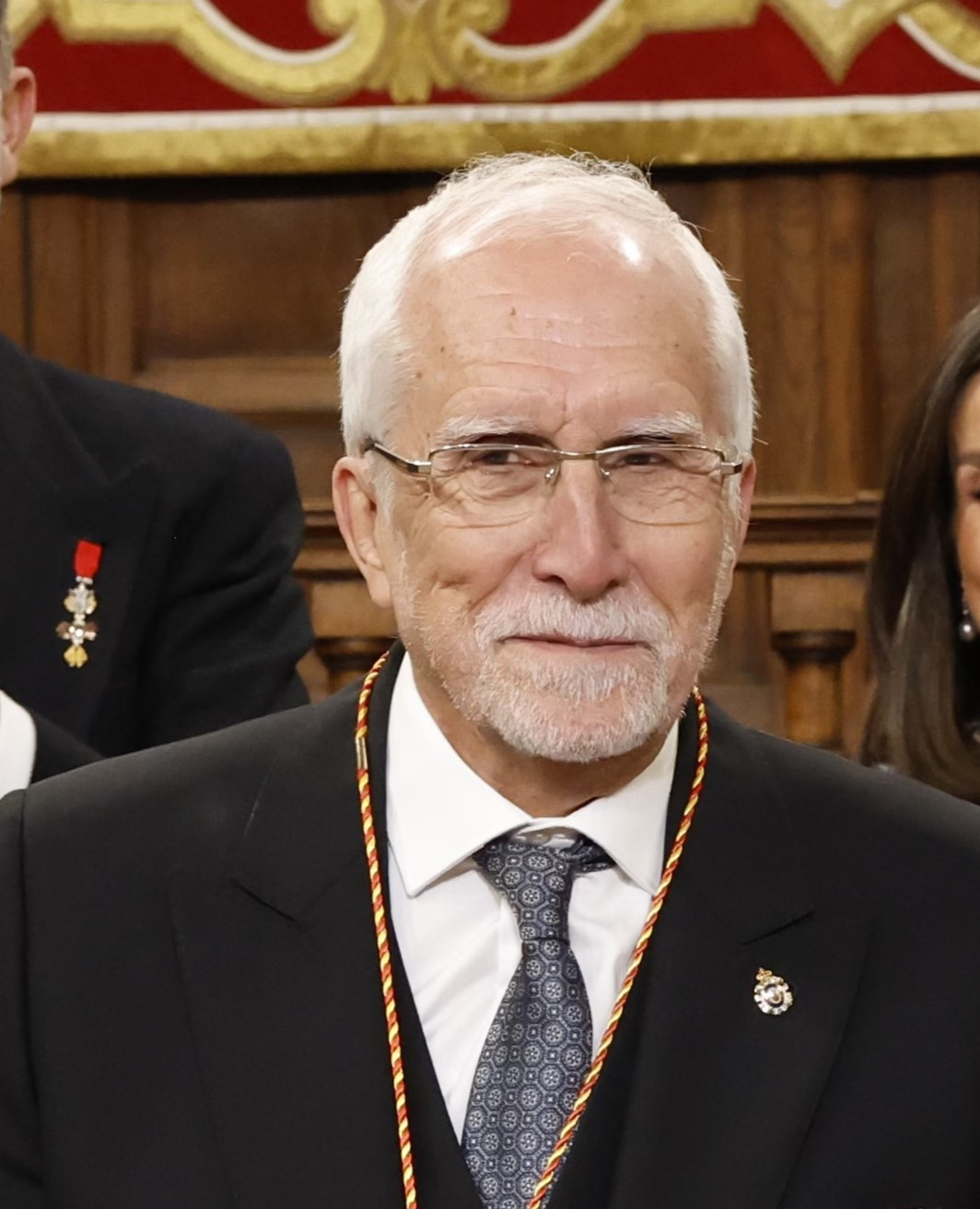
- Born: Luis Mateo Díez Rodríguez; 21 September 1942 (age 83); Villablino (León), Spain

Seat I of the Real Academia Española
- Incumbent
- Assumed office 20 May 2001 (Note: Elected on 22 June 2000)
- Preceded by: Claudio Rodríguez

Luis Mateo Díez Rodríguez (born 21 September 1942) is a Spanish writer. He has written widely in a variety of genres, and has published over 50 books to date. He is best known for his works that focus on the fictional Kingdom of Celama (e.g. El espíritu del páramo, La ruina del cielo and El oscurecer). Two of his novels have won both the Premio de la Crítica and the Premio Nacional de Narrativa - La fuente de la edad in 1986, and La ruina del cielo in 2000. Díez also won the National Prize for Spanish Literature in 2020.

Díez won the Miguel de Cervantes Prize in 2023, the most prestigious literary award in the Spanish-speaking world.
