= José Ángel González Sainz =

Spanish writer, translator and academic (born 1956)

- Born: 1956 (age 69–70); Soria
- Occupations: Writer, translator and academic
- Writing career
- Notable work: Un mundo exasperado
- Notable awards: Premio Herralde

José Ángel González Sainz (born 1956) is a Spanish writer, translator and academic. Born in Soria, he studied philology in Barcelona and has since lived in Madrid, Venice and Trieste. Since 1982, he has taught in Italy, and has translated various Italian writers and intellectuals such as Emmanuele Severino, Guido Ceronetti, Daniele Del Giudice, Giani Stuparich, and notably his friend Claudio Magris. In 1988, he founded the cultural magazine Archipelago, which he jointly ran until 2002 (the publication disappeared in 2008). He has also contributed to various newspapers and magazines such as El País, El Mundo, etc.

The author of half a dozen books, he won the Premio Herralde in 1995 for his novel Un mundo exasperado.

== Selected works ==
- El viento en las hojas
- Ojos que no ven
- Los encuentros
- Un mundo exasperado
- Volver al mundo
- Ojos que no ven
