= Olga Guirao =

Spanish novelist

- Born: 1956 (age 69–70); Barcelona, Spain
- Occupation: Novelist
- Writing career
- Language: Spanish
- Notable work: Mi querido Sebastián (1992)
- Notable awards: Finalist, Premio Herralde (1992)
- Website: www.olgaguirao.com

Olga Guirao (born 1956) is a Spanish novelist from Barcelona. Her debut novel, Mi querido Sebastián, was a finalist for the 1992 Premio Herralde. She has since published several other works of fiction.

== Early life and education ==
Guirao was born in Barcelona in 1956 and studied law at the University of Barcelona. She began her professional career in 1980, working first as an independent practitioner and later within the public administration.

== Career ==
Guirao published Mi querido Sebastián (1992), Adversarios Admirables (Anagrama, 1996), which was translated into Dutch and Danish. In 1998 she contributed the short story “Igual que una mujer vieja y desnuda” to the collective volume Barcelona, un dia: un llibre de contes de la ciutat.

During the 2000s she published Carta con diez años de retraso (Espasa, 2002) and later La llamada (Minotauro, 2011), the latter marking her first work in the science fiction genre.

Guirao later released Bellísimo Hervé (2021), a novel that follows the life of a gay writer over several decades and serves as a literary homage to the French author Hervé Guibert.

== Awards ==
- Finalist, Premio Herralde (1992), for Mi querido Sebastián.

== Works ==
- Mi querido Sebastián (1992)
- Adversarios admirables (Anagrama, 1996)
- Igual que una mujer vieja y desnuda, in Barcelona, un dia: un llibre de contes de la ciutat (1998)
- Carta con diez años de retraso (Espasa, 2002)
- La llamada (Minotauro, 2011)
- Bellísimo Hervé (Egales, 2021)
