= Teresa Dovalpage =

Cuban writer

Teresa Dovalpage (born 1966) is a Cuban writer.

== Life ==
She was born in Havana but left in 1996 for the United States where she has been living ever since. She obtained her doctorate in Latin American literature from the University of New Mexico.

She has published eight novels till date. Her third novel Muerte de un murciano en La Habana (Death of a Murcian in Havana, Anagrama, 2006) was runner-up for the Premio Herralde. Her next novel El difunto Fidel (The Late Fidel) won the Rincon de la Victoria Award in Spain in 2009. She has also published several plays and short story collections.

Dovalpage lives in Taos, New Mexico and teaches at UNM Taos.

As of 2018, she teaches Spanish and ESL at New Mexico Junior College in Hobbs, New Mexico.

== Works ==
- Queen of Bones
- Last Seen in Havana, Soho Press, 2024.
