= Alberto Olmos =

Spanish writer (born 1975)

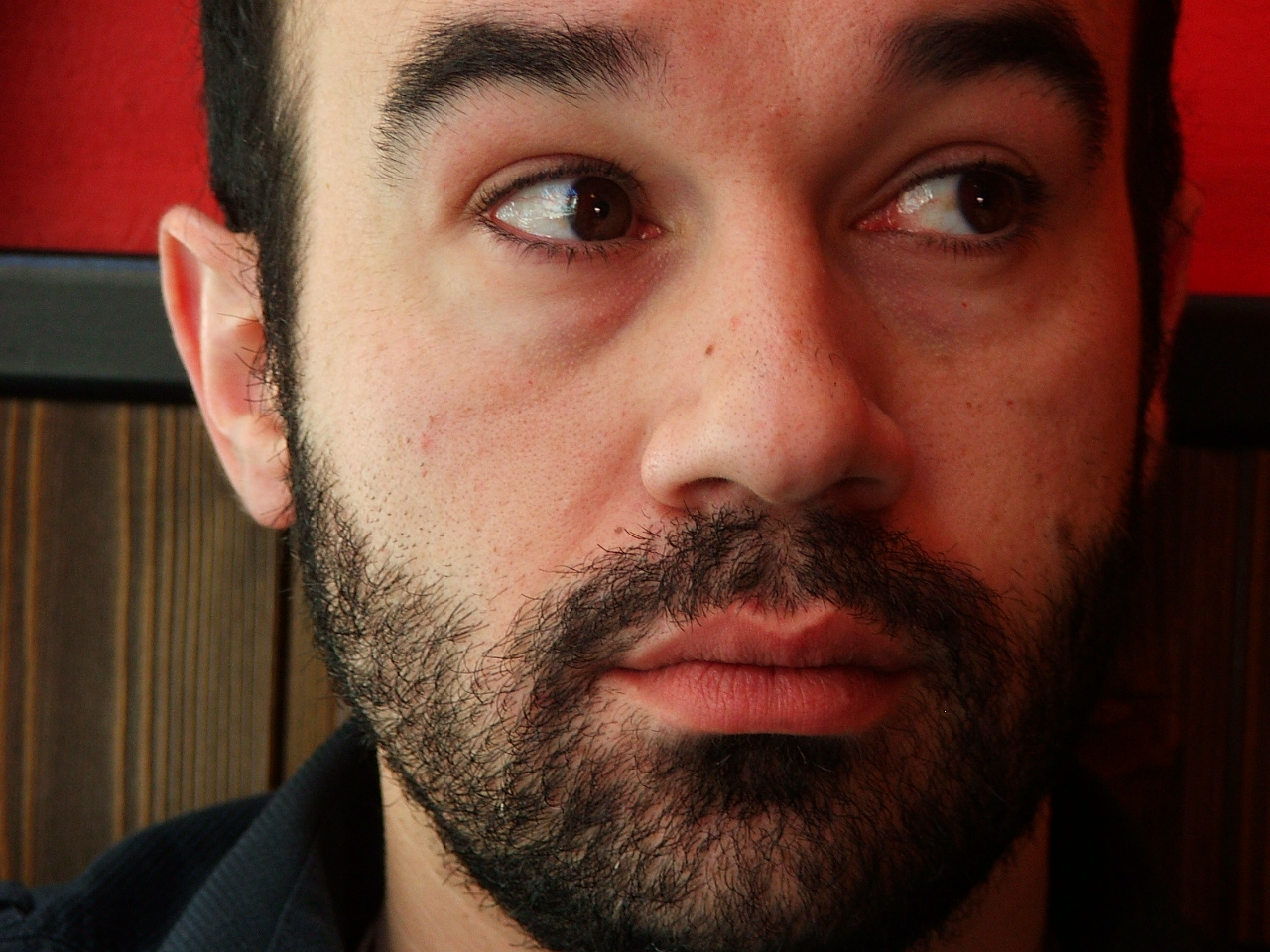
A portrait of Alberto Olmos

Alberto Olmos (born 1975) is a Spanish writer. Born in Segovia, he studied journalism. He published a total of eight novels to date; his debut novel A bordo del naufragio was nominated for the Premio Herralde. Other notable works include Trenes hacia Tokio, El Estatus and Ejército enemigo.

Besides being a successful novelist, Olmos was a pioneer of the Spanish-language literary critique on the internet. He wrote for the newspapers El Mundo, El País and ABC and the journals Qué Leer and Granta en español. In 2010, he was included in Granta magazine's "Best of Young Spanish Language Novelists" list. His books have been translated in Italian, Swedish and English.
