= Berta Serra Manzanares =

Spanish poet and novelist

Berta Serra Manzanares (born 1958) is a Spanish poet and novelist. She was born in Rubí, Barcelona and studied Hispanic philology at the University of Barcelona. She published several volumes of poetry in the 1990s. Turning to fiction, she was nominated for the Premio Herralde for her debut novel El otro lado del mundo. Her second novel was called El oeste más lejano. Her most recent novel Los ojos del huracán is centred on the slave trade in colonial Cuba.

She lives in Terrassa and teaches Spanish language and literature at IES Blanxart. in Terrassa, Barcelona
