= Tryno Maldonado =

Mexican writer (born 1977)

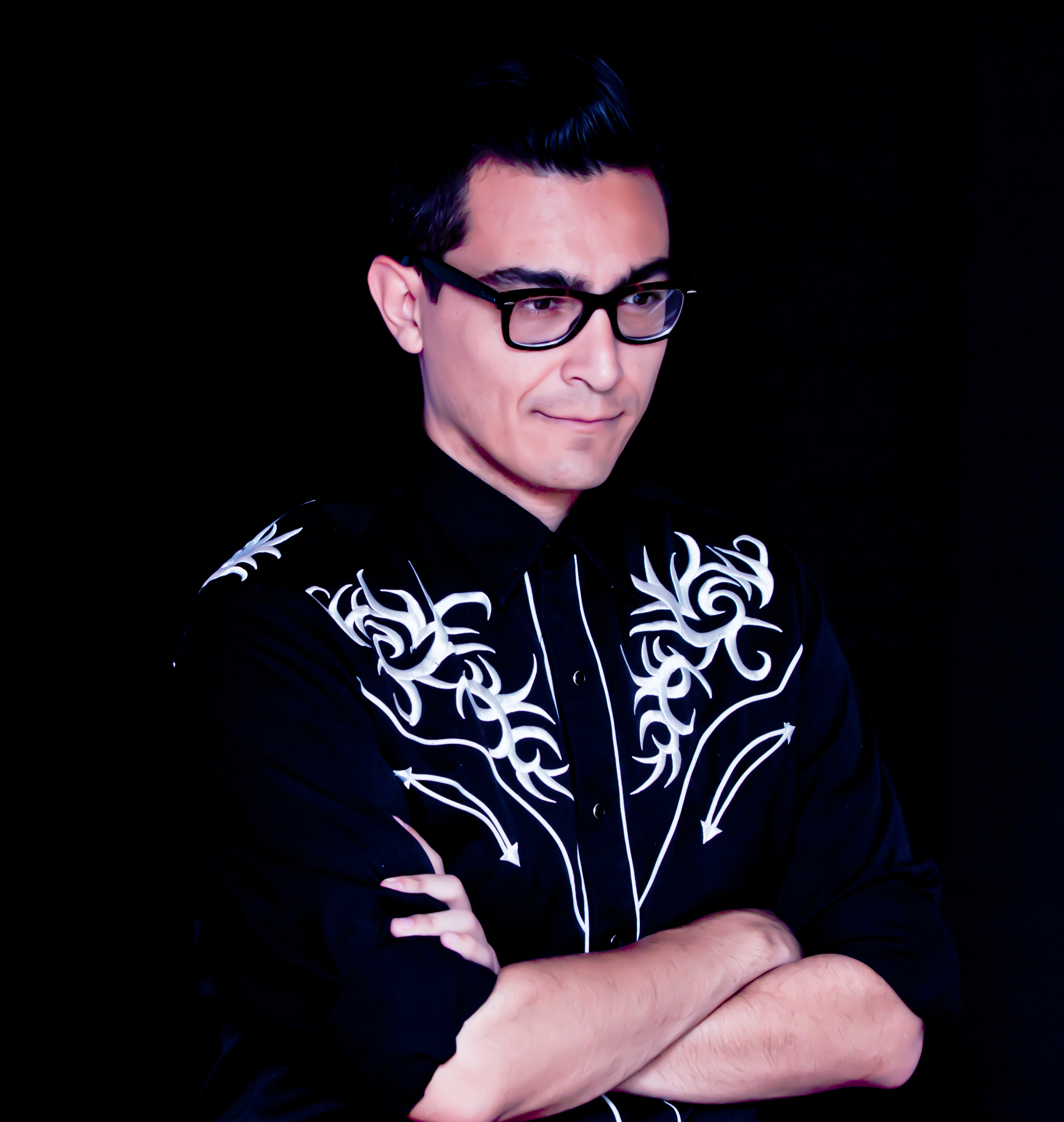
Tryno Maldonado

Tryno Maldonado (born 1977) is a Mexican writer. He was born in Zacatecas, Mexico. In 2006, he was named by the Colombian magazine Gatopardo as one of the best young writers in Latin America. His published work includes the novel Temporada de caza para el león negro which was nominated for the Premio Herralde. He has also edited an anthology of new Mexican writing. Recenetly has spent time with Zapatista movement and Marichuy indigenous politician and the Ayotzinapa family victims.
