= Manuel Pérez Subirana =

Spanish writer (born 1971)

Manuel Pérez Subirana (born 1971) is a Spanish writer. He was born in Barcelona, where he studied law at university. His first novel Lo importante es perder was published in 2003. His second book Egipto was nominated for the Premio Herralde in 2005.
