= Juan José Millás =

Spanish writer (born 1946)

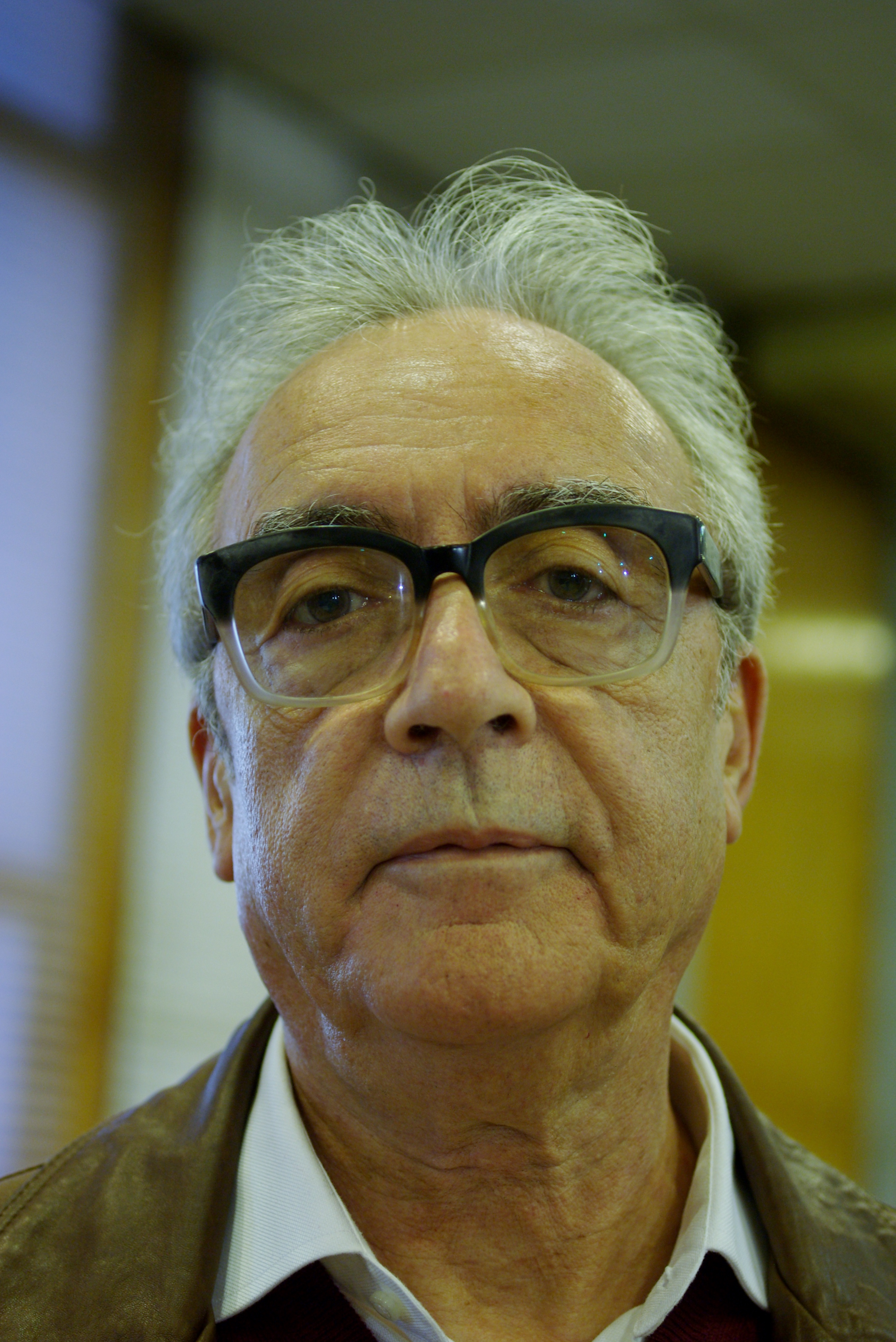
- Juan José Millás in 2016
- Born: Juan José Millás García; January 31, 1946 (age 80); Valencia
- Education: Universidad Complutense de Madrid
- Occupations: Writer and journalist
- Years active: 1975-present

Juan José Millás (born 1946) is a Spanish writer and winner of the 1990 Premio Nadal. He was born in Valencia and has spent most of his life in Madrid, where he studied philosophy and literature at the Universidad Complutense.

== Life ==
A Valencian of humble origins, as a child Millás moved with his large family in 1952 to Madrid, where he has lived for most of his life. He was a poor but curious student and did the majority of his schoolwork at night while he worked in a savings bank. At the university he began studying philosophy and literature, which he abandoned in his third year. He obtained a job as an administrator at Iberia, dedicating himself to reading and writing. His first novel was influenced by Julio Cortázar and consequently shows the influence of the then-prevalent literary experimentalism, as well as the uncertainty of a fledgling author. Although very original, his second book, Cerbero son las sombras (1975), obtained the Premio Sésamo and garnered a positive critical response.

Thanks to an enthusiastic member of the judges panel for the Premio Sésamo, Juan García Hortelano, Millás was able to publish Visión del ahogado (1977) and El jardín vacío (The empty garden) (1981) with the prestigious publisher Alfaguara. But his most popular novel was Papel mojado (1983), an assignment for a publisher of young adult literature that was a commercial success and continues to sell well. Simultaneously, he began to publish articles in the Spanish press with great success, so he left the employment of the Iberian press and now makes a living as a journalist and author.

In his numerous works—which are mostly psychological and introspective—any daily fact can become a fantastic event. He created his own personal literary genre, the articuento, in which an everyday story is transformed into a fantasy that allows the reader to see reality more critically. His weekly columns in El País have generated a great number of followers who appreciate the subtlety and originality of his point of view in dealing with current events, as well as his commitment to social justice and the quality of his writing. On the program La Ventana, on the channel Ser, he has a time slot (Fridays at 4:00) in which he encourages viewers to send short accounts about words from the dictionary. Currently, he is constructing a glossary, within which these accounts have a large role. His works have been translated into 23 languages, among them: English, French, German, Portuguese, Italian, Swedish, Danish, Norwegian, and Dutch. In his 2006 novel, titled Laura y Julio, we find his principal obsessions expressed: the problem of identity, symmetry, other inhabitable spaces within our space, love, fidelity, and jealousy.

He married his second wife, Isabel Menéndez, a psychologist, in 1987. With her, he had his second child.

== Awards ==
In 2005, he was awarded the Premio de Periodismo Francisco Cerecedo. In May 2006, he was also given an honorary doctorate by the Universidad de Turín.

On 15 October 2007, he was presented with the Premio Planeta for his autobiographical novel El mundo, some memories of childhood, almost of adolescence, that tell the story of a boy who lives on the street and whose dream is to escape that street. On 3 December 2007, he was given an honorary doctorate by the Universidad de Oviedo, together with the Asturian poet Ángel González.

On 13 October 2008, Millás was given the Premio Nacional de Narrativa.

He received the 1974 Premio Sésamo for his short novel Cerbero son las sombras and the 1990 Premio Nadal for La soledad era esto.

He received the Premio Primavera de Novela in 2002 for his book Dos Mujeres en Praga (Two Women in Prague).
