= Marcos Giralt Torrente =

Spanish writer (born 1968)

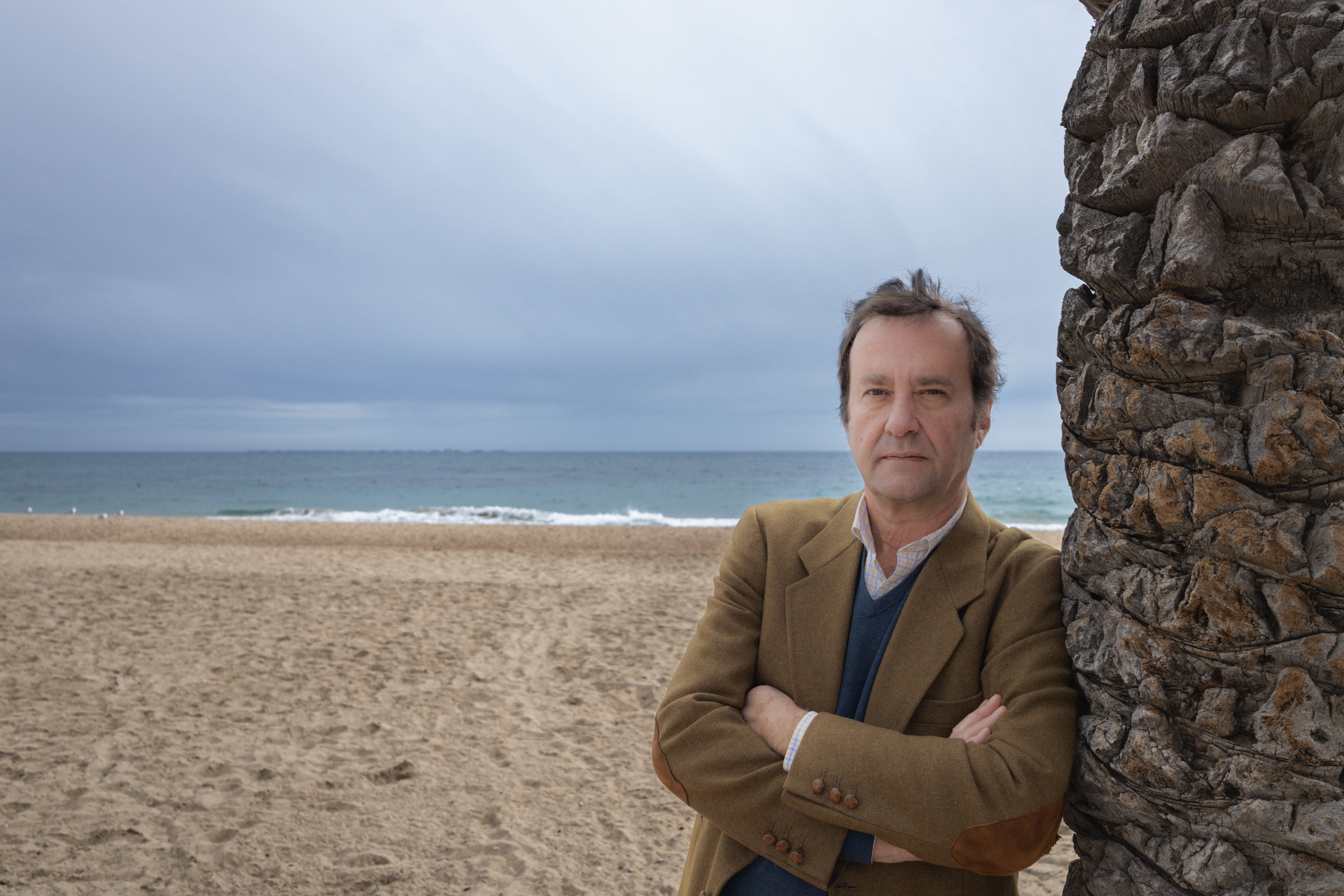
Marcos Giralt Torrente

Marcos Giralt Torrente (born 1968) is a Spanish writer.

== Early life and education ==
Born in Madrid in 1968, Marcos Giralt Torrente studied philosophy at the Universidad Autónoma de Madrid.

== Career ==
Giralt Torrente's first book, a collection of short stories called Entiéndame, appeared in 1995. Since then, he has published three novels and three more short story collections. His literary output over two decades is relatively modest, but Giralt Torrente's work has met with notable critical success and numerous literary prizes.

He is a regular contributor to Babelia, the literary supplement of El País.

== Recognition and awards ==
Giralt Torrente has served as resident writer at the Academia Española in Rome, at Aberdeen University, and at the Santa Maddalena Foundation, among other places. His work has been translated into English, German, French, Italian and Portuguese.

- 1999 - Premio Herralde de Novela, for París.
- 1999 - Premio Modest Furest i Roca, for Nada sucede solo.
- 2011 - Premio Internacional de Narrativa Breve Ribera del Duero, for El final del amor.
- 2011 - Premio Nacional de Narrativa, por Tiempo de vida.
- 2014 - Premio Strega Europeo, for the Italian translation of Tiempo de vida.
