= Still Born (novel) =

2020 novel by Guadalupe Nettel

- Author: Guadalupe Nettel
- Original title: La hija única
- Translator: Rosalind Harvey
- Language: Spanish
- Publisher: Editorial Anagrama
- Publication date: August 16, 2020
- Publication place: Mexico
- English publication date: June 22, 2022
- ISBN: 978-84-339-9906-1

Still Born (Spanish: La hija única) is a 2020 novel by Mexican author Guadalupe Nettel. In 2023, the English translation by Rosalind Harvey was shortlisted for the International Booker Prize.

== Background ==
The inspiration for the book was Nettel's observations of her friend's experiences of raising a disabled child and the discrimination that the child faced. Nettel also wanted to explore questions of motherhood and the societal expectation for women to become mothers.

== Plot ==
Two young cosmopolitan professionals, Laura and Alina, come to terms with their relationship to motherhood. Laura adamantly wishes to be childfree and has her tubes tied. Alina wishes to give birth, but struggles to conceive. When Alina finally becomes pregnant, she and her husband discover that the fetus has a serious brain abnormality. Meanwhile, Laura becomes involved in the care of her neighbor's troubled child. Both women navigate an experience of motherhood that lay outside of their expectations.

== Reception ==
Rebecca Onion, writing for The Washington Post, said that the voice of Laura, the narrator of the novel, was "perfect for delving into the reversals and contradictions of the story". The Economist called the novel a "transfixing tale of motherhood and friendship" and praised Harvey's translation as "skillful". Sarah Resnick, writing for the London Review of Books, comments that through the events of the novel and the characters' reactions and thoughts, perhaps Nettel posits "that there is no such thing as a 'normal mother'". Argentine publication Página 12 praised the novel for its tone, writing that Nettel successfully avoided an overly sentimental or preachy tone.

In 2023, the English translation by Rosalind Harvey was shortlisted for the International Booker Prize. The judges referred to "Nettel's exploration of maternal ambivalence" as "sensitive and surgically precise". They also said that the "twisty, enveloping plot" had "language so blunt it burns".
