= Paloma Díaz-Mas =

Spanish writer and scholar

The Most Excellent Paloma Díaz-Mas
- Born: Paloma Díaz-Mas; 9 May 1954 (age 72); Madrid, Spain
- Education: Complutense University of Madrid
- Occupations: Professor and writer
- Employer: University of the Basque Country Spanish National Research Council
- Known for: Philology, History of literature, judaeo-Spanish, Belles-lettres
- Board member of: Asociación Hispánica de Literatura Medieval
- Awards: Premio Herralde (1992) Premio Euskadi de Literatura en castellano (2000)

Seat i of the Royal Spanish Academy
- Incumbent
- Assumed office 6 November 2022 (Note: Elected on 22 April 2021)
- Preceded by: Margarita Salas

Paloma Díaz-Mas (born 1954) is a Spanish writer and scholar.

She was born in Madrid and studied journalism and philology at university. In 1981, she obtained her doctorate from the Universidad Complutense de Madrid, with a thesis on the subject of Sephardic poetry. At present, she teaches and conducts research at the Consejo Superior de Investigaciones Científicas (CSIC) in Madrid. As a professor of Spanish literature and Sephardic literature, she has taught at the Universidad del País Vasco, the University of Oregon and Washington University in St. Louis.

In April 2021, she was elected as numerary member of the Royal Spanish Academy, intended to occupy the seat i left by Margarita Salas.

== Selected works ==
- Biografías de genios, traidores, sabios y suicidas. Madrid: Editora Nacional, 1973.
- La informante. Toledo: Ebora, 1983. Play. Winner of the Premio Teatro Breve Rojas Zorrilla 1983.
- El rapto del Santo Grial. Barcelona: Anagrama, 1984. Novel. Finalist of the first Premio Herralde 1983.
- Tras las huellas de Artorius. Cáceres: Institución Cultural El Brocense, 1985. Novel. Winner of the Premio Cáceres 1984.
- Los sefardíes: Historia, lengua, cultura. Zaragoza: Riopiedras, 1986. Essays. Finalist of the Premio Nacional de Ensayo 1986.
- Nuestro milenio. Barcelona: Anagrama, 1987. Stories. Finalist of the Premio Nacional de Narrativa 1987.
- "La discreta pecadora o ejemplo de doncellas recogidas". Short story published in: Cuentos eróticos. Laura Freixas (editor). Barcelona: Grijalbo, 1988.
- Una ciudad llamada Eugenio. Barcelona: Anagrama, 1992. Travel.
- El sueño de Venecia. Barcelona: Anagrama, 1992. Novel. Winner of the tenth Premio Herralde 1992.
- "La niña sin alas". Short story in Madres e hijas. Laura Freixas (editor). Barcelona: Anagrama, 1996.
- La tierra fértil. Barcelona: Anagrama, 1999. Novel. Winner of the Premio Euskadi 2000.
- "La construcción de una escritora". Essay in En sus propias palabras. Christine Henseler(editor). Madrid: Torremozas, 2003.
- Como un libro cerrado. Barcelona: Anagrama, 2005. Novel.
- "La visita del Comendador". Short story in Don Juan. Zaragoza: 451 Editores, 2008.
- "Los mayorales exhaustos". Short story in Cuentos de amigas. Laura Freixas (editor). Barcelona: Anagrama, 2009.
- Lo que aprendemos de los gatos. Barcelona: Anagrama, 2014.
