= Guadalupe Nettel =

Mexican writer (born 1973)

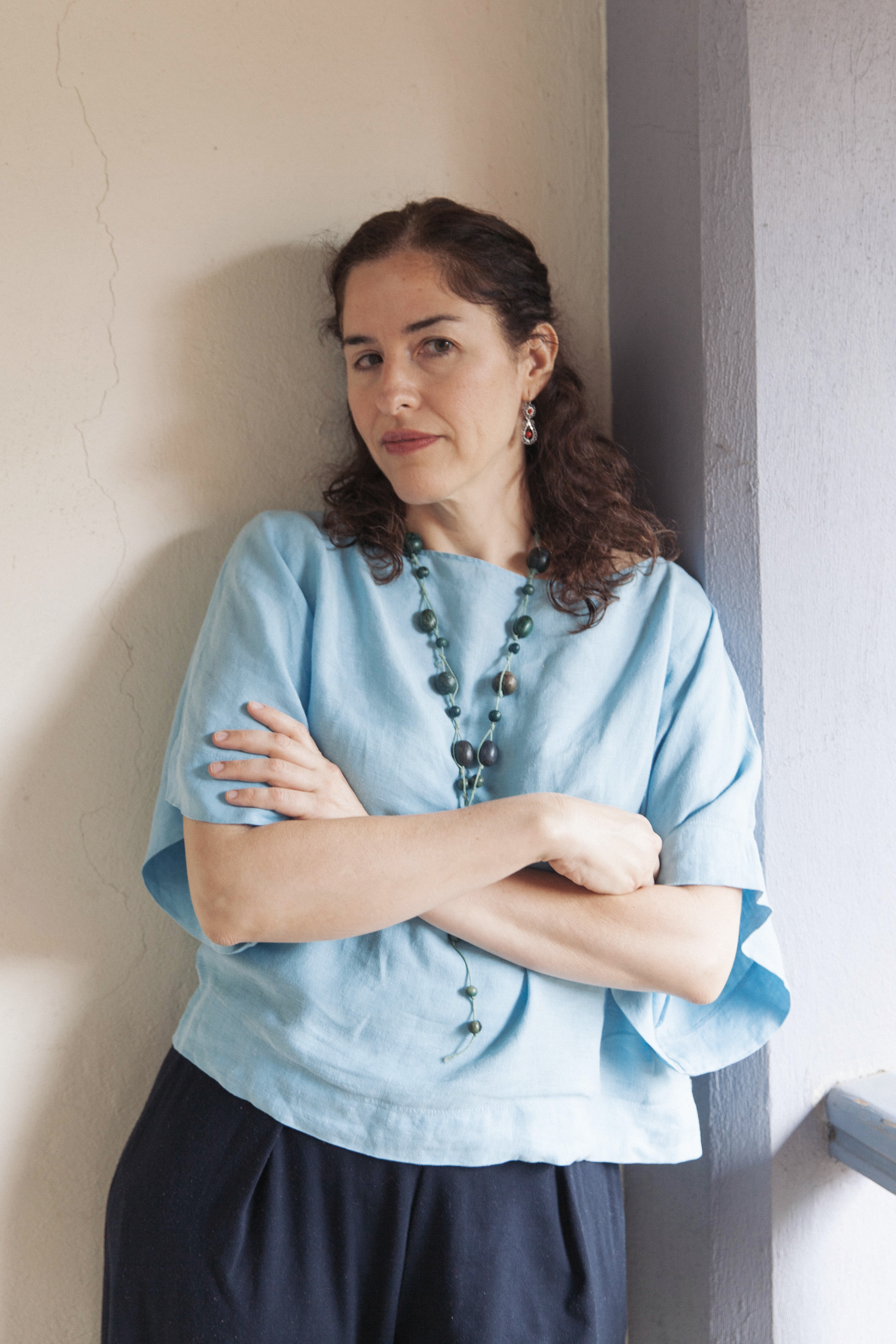
- Guadalupe Nettel, Coyoacan, 2018
- Born: 1973 (age 52–53); Mexico City
- Education: PhD École des Hautes Études en Sciences Sociales; BS National Autonomous University of Mexico
- Occupation: Writer
- Writing career
- Language: Spanish
- Genres: novel, short story
- Notable works: Still Born; The Accidentals; After the Winter
- Notable awards: Shortlisted International Booker Prize, 2023; Premio Herralde de Novela, 2014; Premio de Narrativa Breve Ribera del Duero, 2013; Anna Seghers Prize, 2009
- Website: www.guadalupenettel.com

Guadalupe Nettel (born 1973) is a Mexican writer. She has published four novels, including The Body Where I Was Born (2011), After the Winter (2014) and Still Born (2023), which was shortlisted for the International Booker Prize, as well as three short story collections. She is a recipient of numerous international awards. She has contributed to Granta, El País, The New York Times, The Yale Review, The White Review, La Repubblica and La Stampa. Her works have been translated into more than 20 languages and adapted for film and theater.

== Life and career ==
Guadalupe Nettel was born in Mexico City and spent part of her childhood in the south of France. She obtained a PhD in linguistics from the École des Hautes Études en Sciences Sociales in Paris.

Nettel's novel El huésped was published by Editorial Anagrama in 2006. In 2007, she was selected by the Hay Festival as one of the Bogotá 39, a group of promising young Latin American authors under forty. In 2009, she received the Anna Seghers Prize in Berlin.

The US-based publisher Seven Stories Press published her short-story collection El matrimonio de los peces rojos (winner of the Ribera del Duero award ) as Natural Histories (2014) , as well as the novel The Body Where I Was Born (2015), and her collection Bezoar and Other Unsettling Stories (2020).

After the Winter (winner of the Premio Herralde) was published by MacLehose Press in the United Kingdom and by Coffee House Press in the US.

In 2022, her novel Still Born, published by Fitzcarraldo Editions in the UK, was shortlisted for the International Booker Prize and praised by Nobel Prize winner Annie Ernaux as a book that "renders with great veracity life as it is encountered in the everyday, taking us to the heart of the only things that really matter: life, death and our relationship with others."

Between 2024 and 2025, she was a fellow at the Institute for Ideas & Imagination at Columbia University in Paris.

The Accidentals, her most recent collection of short stories, has been published in the UK by Fitzcarraldo in 2025.

Her work has been translated into more than 20 languages. She is a contributor to various magazines and publications including Granta, El País, The New York Times, The Yale Review, La Repubblica and La Stampa.

Guadalupe Nettel frequently delivers lectures and participates in conferences, including the 2023 José Emilio Pacheco Lecture at the University of Maryland, College Park, the 2024 Lancaster International Fiction Lecture, and the 2025 Puterbaugh Lecture. World Literature Today dedicated the 2025 Puterbaugh Festival to celebrating her work.

From 2017 to 2024 she was the director of the Revista de la Universidad de México of the National Autonomous University of Mexico (UNAM), Mexico's longest-running cultural magazine.

== Published works ==
- Les jours fossiles, Translated Marianne Millon, L'éclose éditions, 2002, ISBN 9782914963015
- El huésped, Editorial Anagrama, 2006, ISBN 9788433971289
- Pétalos y otras historias incómodas, Editorial Anagrama, 2008, ISBN 9788433971661
  - Bezoar And Other Unsettling Stories. Translated by Suzanne Jill Levine. Seven Stories Press. 2020. ISBN 9781609809584.
- El cuerpo en que nací, Editorial Anagrama, 2011, ISBN 9788433933201
  - The Body Where I was Born. Translated by J.T. Lichtenstein. Seven Stories Press. 2015. ISBN 978-1-60980-527-2.
- El matrimonio de los peces rojos, Páginas de Espuma, 2013, ISBN 9786079278335
  - Natural Histories. Translated by J.T. Lichtenstein. Seven Stories Press. 2014. ISBN 9781609805517.
- Después del invierno, Editorial Anagrama, 2014, ISBN 9788433997845
  - After the Winter. Translated by Rosalind Harvey. Coffee House Press. 2018. ISBN 9781566895330.
- La hija única, Editorial Anagrama, 2020, ISBN 9788433999061
  - Still Born. Translated by Rosalind Harvey. Fitzcarraldo Editions. 2022. ISBN 9781913097677.
- Los divagantes, Editorial Anagrama, 2023, ISBN 978-84-339-0818-6
  - The Accidentals. Translated by Rosalind Harvey. Fitzcarraldo Editions. 2025. ISBN 9781804271476.

Essays

- Para entender a Julio Cortázar, Nostra Ediciones, 2008, ISBN 9789685447973
- Octavio Paz. Las palabras en libertad. Penguin Random House Grupo Editorial México. 3 November 2014. ISBN 978-607-11-3487-5.

== Awards and honors ==
- Shortlisted for the International Booker Prize (2023) for Still Born
- Recipient of the Borchard Foundation Literary Fellowship (2021, 2022, 2023)
- Winner of the Cálamo Prize (2020)
- Finalist for the Neustadt International Prize for Literature (2016)
- Winner of the XXXII Premio Herralde de Novela (2014) for After the Winter
- Winner of the III Premio de Narrativa Breve Ribera del Duero (2013)
- Winner of the Anna Seghers Prize (2009)
- Winner of the Gilberto Owen National Prize of Literature (2008)
- Winner of the jeunes Alliance française prize (1992)
