= Huberto Pérez de la Ossa =

Spanish writer and theatre director (1897–1983)

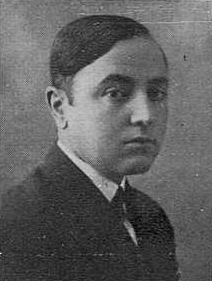
Image of Huberto Pérez de la Ossa Rodríguez

Huberto Pérez de la Ossa Rodríguez (born Albacete, 1897– died Salamanca, 31 August 1983) was a Spanish writer and theatre director. His published work includes El ancla de Jasón (1921), La lámpara del dolor (1923), El opio del ensueño (1924), La Santa Duquesa (1924) (Premio Nacional de Literatura), La casa de los masones (1927) and El aprendiz de ángel (1935). After the Spanish Civil War, he moved on to stage direction. Between 1940 and 1952, he collaborated with Luis Escobar Kirkpatrick at the Teatro María Guerrero in Madrid. He also translated foreign plays into Spanish, including several works by Dostoyevsky.

== See also ==
- Roberto Molina (writer) (Alcaraz, 1883–1958)
- Artemio Precioso (writer) (Hellín, 1891–1945)
- Mariano Tomás (Hellín, 1891–1957)
