= Cynthia Rimsky =

Chilean writer (born 1962)

- Born: Cynthia Clara Rimsky Mitnik; September 27, 1962 (age 64); Santiago, Chile
- Citizenship: Chilean
- Occupations: Writer; journalist; academic
- Notable work: Poste restante Clara y confusa
- Awards: Premio Herralde (2024); National Prize for Literature (2026)

Cynthia Clara Rimsky Mitnik (born September 27, 1962) is a Chilean writer, journalist, and academic. Since 2012 she has lived in Argentina. Her hybrid body of work moves between travel literature, autobiography, autofiction, and the essay, and explores themes of memory, displacement, and identity.

She published her debut novel, Poste restante, in 2001. In 2024, Rimsky won the Herralde Prize for her novel Clara y confusa, becoming the first Chilean woman to receive the award. In August 2026, she received Chile's National Prize for Literature, becoming the seventh woman to be so honored.

== Early life and education ==
Rimsky was born in Santiago, Chile, on September 27, 1962, into a Jewish family of Ukrainian and Polish immigrant descent. She graduated with a degree in journalism in 1984. That same year, she completed an internship at the newspaper El Mercurio in Valparaíso, where she subsequently settled.

== Career ==
=== Early literary career ===
In 2001, Rimsky published her debut novel, Poste restante, inspired by a journey she undertook through Europe, Israel, and Ukraine after finding a photo album bearing her family's surname at a flea market in Santiago. She has since published more than ten books, including La novela de otro (2004), Los perplejos (2009), Ramal (2011), El futuro es un lugar extraño (2016), Fui (2016), En obra (2018), La revolución a dedo (2020), and La vuelta al perro (2022).

In 2017, she won both the Santiago Municipal Literature Award and Chile's Prize for Best Published Literary Works for El futuro es un lugar extraño ("The Future Is a Strange Place"). She won the Santiago Municipal Literature Award again in 2021 for La revolución a dedo, and the Prize for Best Published Literary Works a second time in 2023 for her novel Yomurí.

=== Academic career ===
Rimsky has taught at the National University of the Arts in Buenos Aires and at the writing diploma program of the Pontificia Universidad Católica de Valparaíso.

=== Clara y confusa and the Herralde Prize ===
In May 2024, Forbes magazine included Rimsky among the 50 most creative Chileans. That November, she won the 42nd Herralde Prize for Novel, shared ex aequo with Spanish writer Xita Rubert, for her novel Clara y confusa, selected from 1,149 submitted manuscripts. The novel, published by Anagrama and carrying a prize of €25,000, follows a plumber who falls for a conceptual artist while uncovering corruption within his trade guild, weaving in questions about the nature and purpose of art. With the win, Rimsky became the first Chilean woman, and only the second Chilean writer after Roberto Bolaño in 1998, to receive the Herralde Prize.

=== National Prize for Literature ===
On August 28, 2026, Chile's Ministry of Cultures, Arts, and Heritage announced that Rimsky had won the National Prize for Literature for that year's narrative category, succeeding 2025 laureate Ramón Díaz Eterovic. Her candidacy had been sponsored by the Pontificia Universidad Católica de Valparaíso. She became the seventh woman to receive the prize, after Gabriela Mistral, Marta Brunet, Marcela Paz, María Luisa Bombal, Isabel Allende, and Diamela Eltit. The jury, chaired by minister Francisco Undurraga, praised Rimsky's ability to turn displacement into a distinctive narrative structure built from fragments, documents, and lateral observation.

== Style ==
Rimsky's work has been described as a form of travel literature that blends travel chronicle, autobiography, autofiction, and essay. Her narratives frequently combine documentary research, travel, and autobiographical material, and center on themes of memory, displacement, and identity, often built through fragments, objects, and everyday encounters rather than conventional plot.

== Works ==
- Poste restante (2001)
- La novela de otro (2004)
- Los perplejos (2009)
- Ramal (2011)
- El futuro es un lugar extraño (2016)
- Fui (2016)
- En obra (2018)
- La revolución a dedo (2020)
- La vuelta al perro (2022)
- Yomurí (2023)
- Clara y confusa (2024)

== Awards ==
- Gabriela Mistral Literary Games (1994), for El aliento de Fátima
- Santiago Municipal Literature Award (2001), for Poste restante
- Santiago Municipal Literature Award (2017) and Prize for Best Published Literary Works (2017), for El futuro es un lugar extraño
- Santiago Municipal Literature Award (2021), for La revolución a dedo
- Prize for Best Published Literary Works (2023), for Yomurí
- Herralde Prize for Novel (2024), for Clara y confusa
- National Prize for Literature (2026)
