= José Morella =

Spanish writer (born 1972)

José Morella (born 1972) is a Spanish writer. Born in Ibiza, he studied literary theory and comparative literature at university. Among his published work are the novels La fatiga del vampiro (Bassarai, 2004), Como caminos en la niebla (Stella Maris, 2016) and the poetry collection Tambor de luz (Ediciones Osuna, 2001). His novel Asuntos propios (Anagrama, 2009) was nominated for the Premio Herralde. West End, his last piece of fiction, was awarded with the Premio Café Gijón in 2019. He has also translated the work of the Brazilian poet Ferreira Gullar (Murmullos, Bassarai, 2006) and Scottish poet Douglas Dunn (Poemas escogidos, Bassarai, 2009) .

Morella lives in Barcelona.
