= Roberto Fernández =

Roberto Fernández may refer to:

== Arts and Entertainment ==
- Roberto Fernández Beyró (1909–1991), Argentine restaurateur and food critic
- Roberto Fernández Retamar (1930–2019), Cuban poet
- Roberto Fernández Sastre (born 1951), Uruguayan writer
- Roberto G. Fernández (born 1951), Cuban novelist
- Roberto Fernández Canuto (born 1973), Spanish director

== Sportspeople ==
=== Association football ===
- Roberto Fernández (footballer, born 1954), Paraguayan footballer
- Robert Fernández (footballer) (born 1962), Spanish footballer
- Roberto Fernandez (footballer, born 1971), Indian footballer
- Roberto Fernández (footballer, born 1979), Spanish footballer
- Gatito Fernández (born 1988), Paraguayan footballer
- Roberto Fernández (Bolivian footballer) (born 1999), Bolivian footballer
- Roberto Fernández (footballer, born 2000), Paraguayan football defender
- Roberto Fernández (footballer, born 2002), Spanish football attacking midfielder

== Other sports ==
- José Roberto Fernández Filho (born 1980), Brazilian equestrian

== See also ==
- Roberto Hernández (disambiguation)
- Rober Bodegas (born 1982), Spanish comedian born Roberto Fernández Cancela
