= Luis Magrinyà =

Spanish writer and translator (born 1960)

Luis Magrinyà (born 1960) is a Spanish writer and translator. Born in Palma de Mallorca, he has lived in Madrid since 1982. He is known as a member of the "Generación Inexistente" of writers. He is best known for two novels: Los dos Luises which won the Premio Herralde and Habitación doble which won the Premio Otras Voces, Otros Ámbitos.
