= Diego Vecchio =

Argentine writer and translator (born 1969)

Diego Vecchio (born 1969) is an Argentine writer and translator. He was born in Buenos Aires but moved to Paris in his early 20s (in 1992) and has lived there ever since. He now teaches Latin American literature at the Paris 8 University (Vincennes-Saint Denis). He has written several books, including both fiction and non-fiction. His most recent novel La extinción de las especies was a finalist in the Premio Herralde.

== Selected works ==
- Historia calamitatum (Paradiso, 2000)
- Egocidios: Macedonio Fernández y la liquidación del yo (Egocides: Macedonio Fernández and the Liquidation of the Self, Beatriz Viterbo, 2003).
- Microbios (Microbes, Beatriz Viterbo, 2006)
- Osos (Bears, Beatriz Viterbo, 2010)
- La extinción de las especies
