= Carlos Perellón =

Spanish writer and journalist (born 1954)

Carlos Perellon (born 1954, Madrid) is a Spanish writer and journalist. Perellon is best known for his novel La ciudad doble which won the Premio Herralde in 1994. It is his only book to date. Perellon has worked for UNICEF in New York City as director of Spanish-language publications.
