= Miguel Ángel Hernández =

Spanish writer (born 1977)

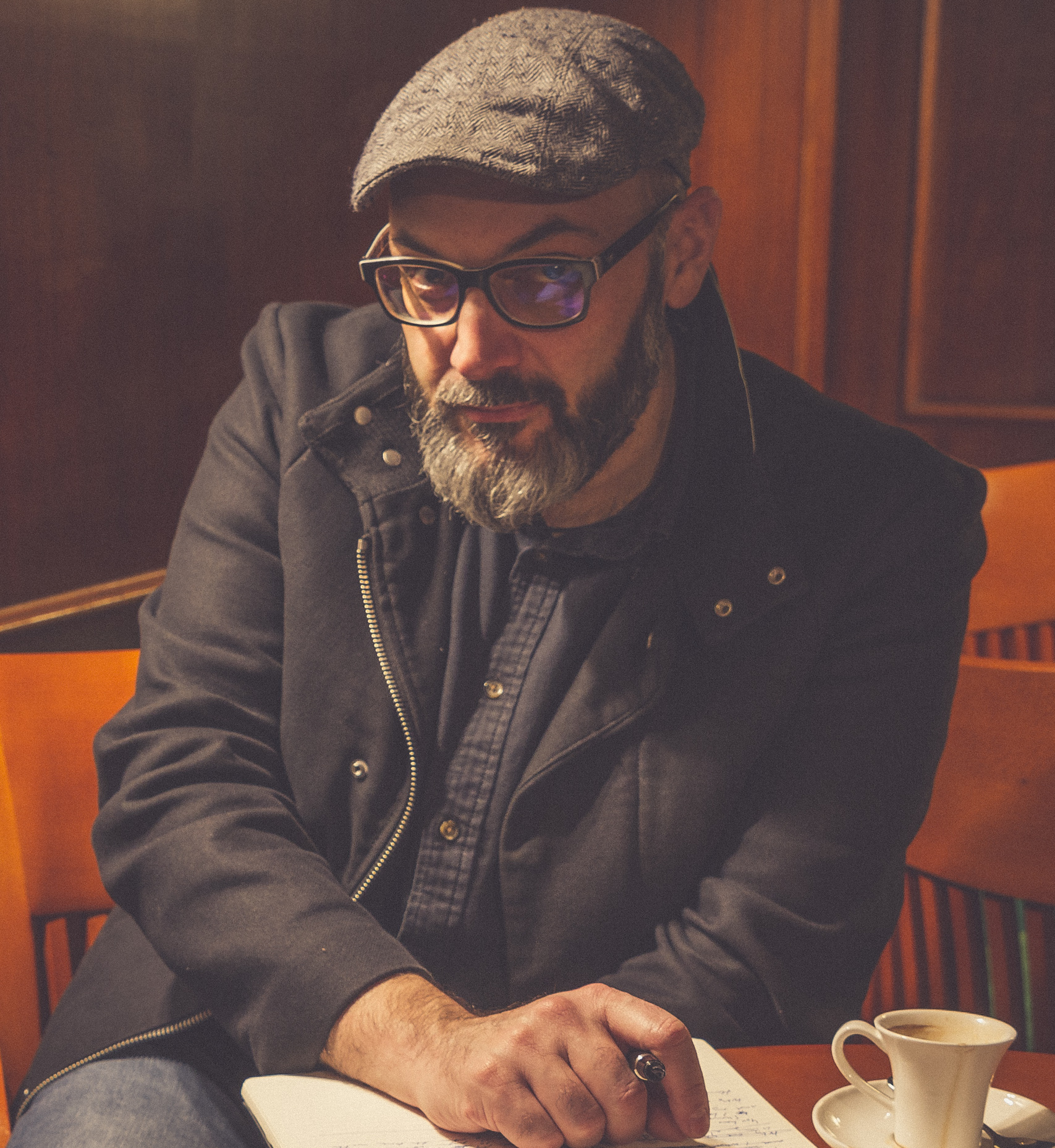
Miguel Ángel Hernández

Miguel Ángel Hernández (born Murcia, 1977) is a Spanish writer. He is professor of art history at the University of Murcia, and has published several books on art and visual culture. He is best known for his fictional works, among them the novels Intento de escapada (2013), which won the Premio Ciudad Alcalá de Narrativa and was translated in five languages, and El instante de peligro (2015), which was a finalist for the Premio Herralde de Novela. His novel is El dolor de los demás (2018), selected among the books of the year by El País and The New York Times en Español.

== Bibliography ==
Novels

- Intento de escapada. Anagrama, 2013 (Escape Attempt, Hispabooks, 2016).
- El instante de peligro. Anagrama, 2015.
- El dolor de los demás. Anagrama, 2018 (The Pain of Others, Other Press, 2026).
- Anoxia. Anagrama, 2023 (Anoxia, Other Press, 2025).

Short Stories

- Infraleve: lo que queda en el espejo cuando dejas de mirarte. Editora Regional, 2004.
- Demasiado tarde para volver. Tres Fronteras, 2008.
- Cuaderno [...]duelo. Nausicaa, 2011.

Diaries

- Presente continuo (Diario de una novela). Balduque, 2016.
- Diario de Ithaca. Fundación Newcastle, 2016.
- Aquí y ahora. Diario de escritura. Fórcola, 2019.
