= José María Riera de Leyva =

- Born: 1934 (age 91–92); Almeria
- Occupation: Novelist
- Writing career
- Notable work: Lejos de Marrakech
- Notable awards: Premio Sésamo

José María Riera de Leyva (born 1934) is a Spanish novelist. Born in Almeria, he was raised in Barcelona. He studied architecture and journalism at university. He won the Premio Sésamo in 1959 but disappeared from the literary scene for almost two decades, before returning with the novels Lejos de Marrakech (1989) and Territorio enemigo (1991). Both titles were translated into French and Italian. In 1993, he won the Premio Herralde for his novel Aves de paso.
