= Alfredo Conde =

Galician writer and politician

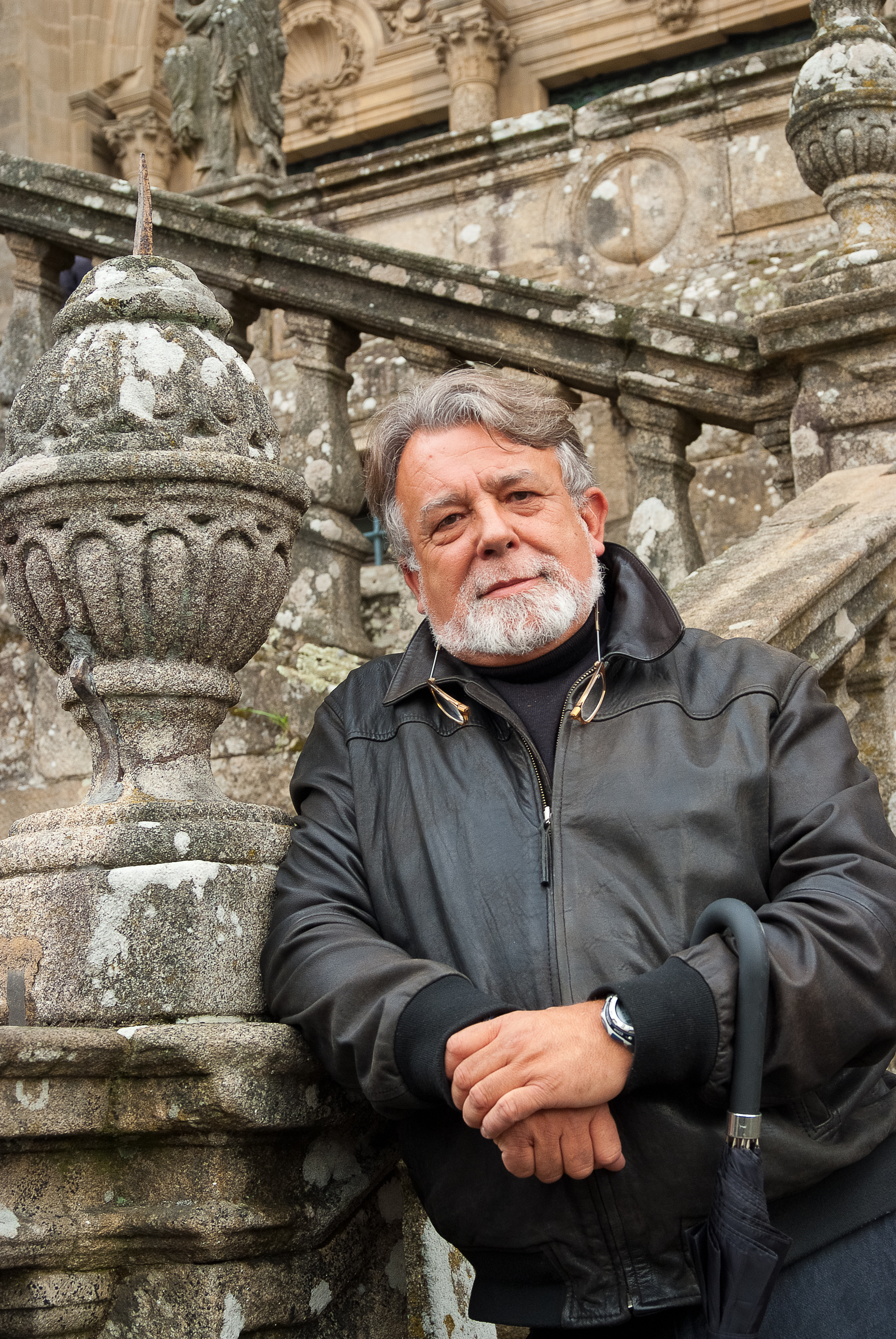
- Conde at the Praza do Obradoiro
- Born: January 6, 1945; Allariz, Galicia, Spain
- Occupations: Writer, politician
- Writing career
- Language: Galician, Spanish
- Notable works: Xa vai o Griffón no vento, Los otros días, Breixo
- Notable awards: Premio Nacional de Narrativa (1986), Premio Nadal (1991), Medalla Castelao (2016)

Alfredo Conde Cid (born 6 January 1945 in Allariz) is a Galician writer and politician, who has published in both Galician and Spanish.

== Biography ==
Conde was born into a middle-class family with strong Galicianist traditions. He studied nautical science at the Nautical College of A Coruña and History at the University of Santiago de Compostela. He worked as a merchant sailor and later as a history teacher in a private school.

In 1973, he co-founded the bookstore Xuntanza in Pontevedra with José Luis Llácer, Margariña Valderrama, María Victoria Moreno, Blanca Varona, Ramón Yuste, Carmen María Echarre, Paco Gulías and Javier Yuste. The bookstore closed in 1976 due to debts.

Between 1981 and 1993, Conde served as a member of the Parliament of Galicia as an independent in the Socialists' Party of Galicia parliamentary group. From 1987 to 1990 he was the regional minister of culture in the government of Fernando González Laxe. He also became the first president of the PEN Club of Galicia (1990–1991).

His first published work was the poetry collection Mencer de lúas (1968), but he is best known for his narrative prose, beginning with the short story collection Mementos de vivos (1974).

== Works in Galician ==
=== Fiction ===
- Mementos de vivos (1974, Galaxia)
- Contubernio catro de Tomé S. (1978; republished as O contubernio, 1988)
- Come e bebe que o barco é do amo (1978, Akal)
- Breixo (1981, Xerais)
- Memoria de Noa (1982, Xerais)
- Xa vai o Griffón no vento (1984, Galaxia), Premio Nacional de Narrativa
- Música sacra (1990, Galaxia)
- A morte de Blas (1992)
- Sempre me matan (1995, Ir Indo)
- A casa de Adara (1996)
- O fácil que é matar (1998)
- Memoria do soldado (2002)
- Romasanta. Memorias incertas do home lobo (2004)
- Lukumí (2006, Galaxia)
- María das Batallas (2007, Galaxia)
- Chovida do ceo (2014, Xerais)
- O beato (2016, Xerais)
- Un vento que pasa (2019, Galaxia)
- Homes de ferro (2020, Ézaro)
- A conto do político (2023, Ézaro)

=== Poetry ===
- Mencer de lúas (1968)
- ColeccionAN. 69 poemas de amor (2014)

=== Other works ===
- Conversas con Alfredo Conde. Xuízo, sentenza e condena (2009, with Xosé Manuel del Caño)
- Numerous contributions to collective volumes, anthologies and cultural projects.

== Works in Spanish ==
- Los otros días (1991)
- Cubita, la bella (1992)
- Azul cobalto. Historia posible del Marqués de Sargadelos (2001)
- María de las batallas (2008)
- Huesos de santo (2010)
- El beato (2016)

== Awards and honours ==
=== For works in Galician ===
- Premio da Crítica Española (1981) for Breixo
- Premio da Crítica de Galicia (1982) for Breixo
- Premio Chitón de Novela (1983) for Memoria de Noa
- Premio Ícaro (1983) for Memoria de Noa
- Premio Blanco Amor (1984) for Xa vai o Griffón no vento
- Premio da Crítica Española (1984) for Xa vai o Griffón no vento
- Premio Ginzane Cavour (Turin) for Xa vai o Griffón no vento
- Premio Nacional de Narrativa (1986) for Xa vai o Griffón no vento
- Premio Puro Cora (2025)
- Premio Álvaro Cunqueiro de gastronomía (2025) for E se voara

=== For works in Spanish ===
- Premio Nadal (1991) for Los otros días
- Premio Ateneo-Ciudad de Valladolid (2016) for El beato

=== Career honours ===
- Medalla Castelao (2016)
- Honorary citizen of the Province of Ourense (2021)

== Personal life ==
Conde was married to Margariña Valderrama, with whom he had two daughters.
