= Rafael Sender =

Spanish writer (born 1950)

Rafael Sender (born 1950) is a Spanish writer. He studied at the University of Barcelona, where he has lived since the age of three. He has also spent large tracts of time in Peru, working there variously as a journalist, professor, and director of the Spanish Cultural Centre in Lima. He has published several novels, including Tendras Oro y Oro which was nominated for the Premio Herralde.
