= Pablo d'Ors =

Spanish priest, theologian and writer (born 1963)

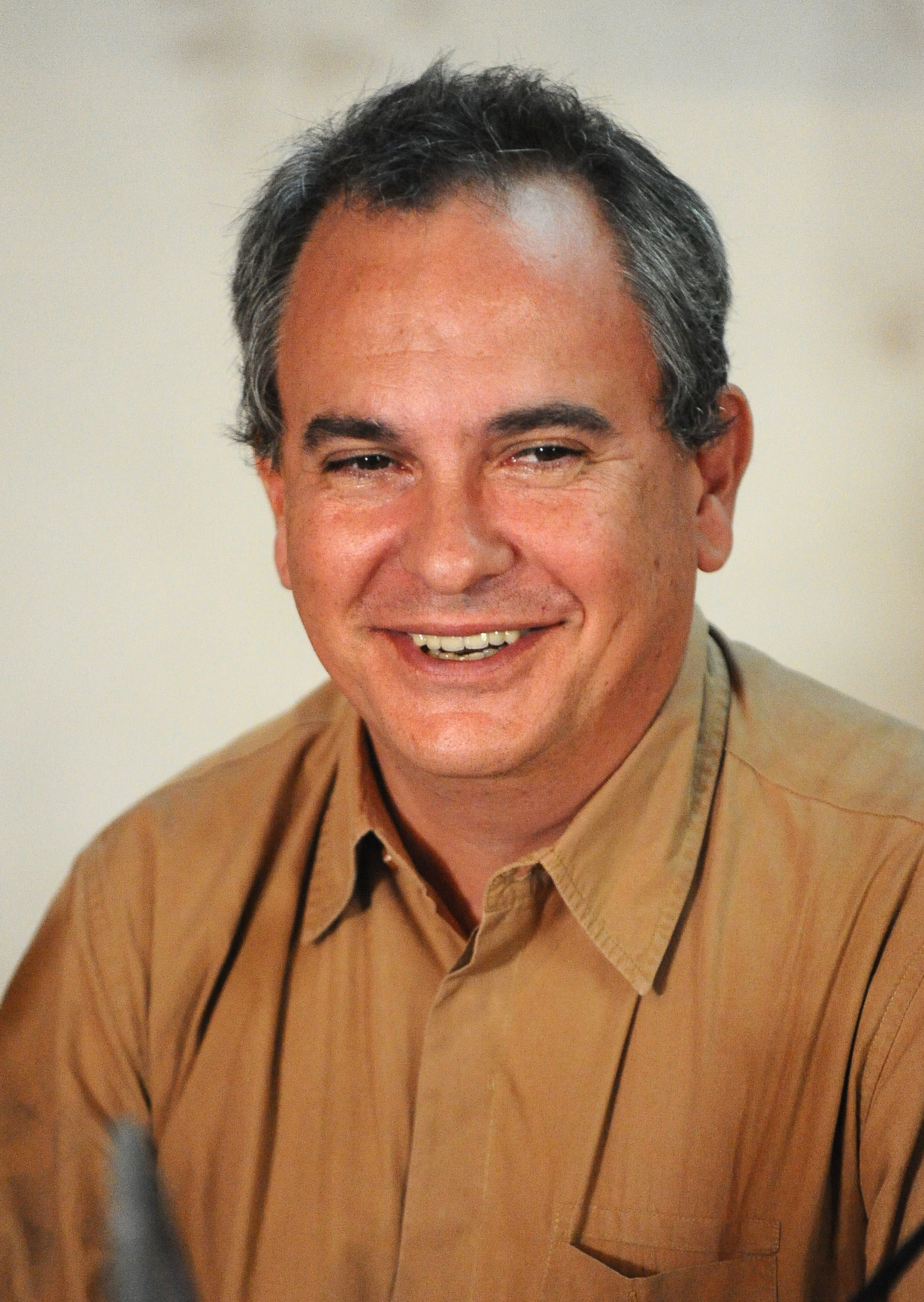
Pablo d'Ors at Festivaletteratura in Mantua in 2012

Pablo d'Ors (born 1963) is a Spanish priest, theologian and writer. He was born in Madrid; his grandfather was the essayist and art critic Eugenio d'Ors. He was educated in New York, Rome, Prague and Vienna. As a novelist, d'Ors has published half a dozen titles. His debut novel Las ideas puras was nominated for the Premio Herralde.
