= Natural Histories (short story collection) =

2013 short story collection by Guadalupe Nettel

El matrimonio de los peces rojos
- Author: Guadalupe Nettel
- Language: Spanish
- Genre: Short story collection
- Publisher: Páginas de Espuma
- Publication date: 6 May 2013
- Publication place: Mexico
- Pages: 128
- Award: Premio Internacional de Narrativa Breve Ribera del Duero (2013)
- ISBN: 978-84-8393-144-8

Natural Histories (original title in Spanish: El matrimonio de los peces rojos) is a short story collection by Mexican writer Guadalupe Nettel, first published in 2013 by Páginas de Espuma. The book brings together five stories that centre on human relationships and emotional conflict, with each narrative structured around a sustained interaction with an animal or other living organism.

The manuscript received the III Premio Internacional de Narrativa Breve Ribera del Duero in 2013, when it circulated under the working title Historias naturales.

An English translation by J. T. Lichtenstein was later published by Seven Stories Press under the title Natural Histories.

== Background and publication ==
The Ribera del Duero jury awarded the 2013 prize to Nettel for a collection of five interconnected stories unified by the presence of an animal in each narrative. At the time of submission, the manuscript bore the provisional title Historias naturales and had not yet been published.

The Spanish edition was released by Páginas de Espuma in May 2013. Standard bibliographic records list the book as comprising 128 pages. The English edition, Natural Histories, was published by Seven Stories Press, with translation by J. T. Lichtenstein.

== Contents ==
The collection consists of five short stories:

- El matrimonio de los peces rojos
- Guerra en los basureros
- Felina
- Hongos
- La serpiente de Beijín

Each narrative places a character in sustained contact with a living being, such as fish, insects, cats, fungi, or reptiles, through which emotional tension, intimacy, and conflict are gradually revealed.

== Themes and style ==
The stories establish close parallels between human behaviour and animal life. In interviews and critical profiles, Nettel has referred to the collection as a contemporary bestiary, using animals to expose aspects of domestic life that remain hidden or unspoken. Academic analysis has examined the book in relation to Human–animal studies, noting how the narratives move between controlled, domestic forms of life and invasive or disruptive ones in order to structure both narrative space and psychological development.
