= Federico Jeanmaire =

Argentine writer

Federico Jeanmaire (born 1957) is an Argentine writer.

He was born in the town of Baradero. He studied at the University of Buenos Aires, and later became a professor at the same institution. He specializes in the literature of the Siglo de Oro, including the life and work of Miguel de Cervantes. He has published more than 20 books of fiction and non-fiction, and has won a number of Argentine literary prizes. Among his noted works are the novels Mitre (winner of the Premio Especial Ricardo Rojas), Vida interior (Premio Emecé), and Más liviano que el aire (Premio Clarín). His 1990 novel Miguel, a fictional biography of Cervantes, was nominated for the Premio Herralde, as was the later novel Amores enanos. His book Una lectura del Quijote (Seix-Barral, 2004) is regarded as a major contribution to the field of Cervantes scholarship.

== Selected works ==
- Un profundo vacío en el pie izquierdo (autoedición, 1984)
- Desatando casi los nudos (Norma, 1986, reedición de Seix Barral, 2007)
- Miguel (Anagrama, Barcelona, 1990)
- Prólogo anotado (Sudamericana, 1993)
- Montevideo (Norma, 1997)
- Mitre (Norma, 1998, reedición de Seix Barral, 2006)
- Los zumitas (Norma, 1999)
- Una virgen peronista (Norma, 2001)
- Papá (Sudamericana, 2003, reedición de Seix Barral, 2007; por Edhasa en el 2015))
- Países Bajos (Seix-Barral, 2004)
- Cómo se empieza a escribir una narración ( VV.AA., Libros del Rojas, 2006)
- El ingenioso hidalgo don Quijote de la Mancha, edición para niños, adaptación junto con Ángeles Durini (Emecé, 2004)
- Cómo se empieza an escribir una narración (VV.AA., Libros del Rojas, 2006)
- La patria (Seix Barral, 2006)
- Vida interior (Premio Emecé, 2008)
- Antología Los días que vivimos en peligro (Emecé, 2009)
- Más liviano que el aire (Alfaguara/Clarín, 2009)
- Los zumitas/El silencio del río (Ediciones Outsider, 2010, libro doble con Juan Martín Guastavino)
- Fernández Mata a Fernández (Alfaguara/Clarín, 2011)
- Las madres no les decimos esas cosas a las hijas (Seix Barral, 2012)
- Tacos altos, Anagrama (2016)
