= Marta Sanz =

Spanish writer (born 1967)

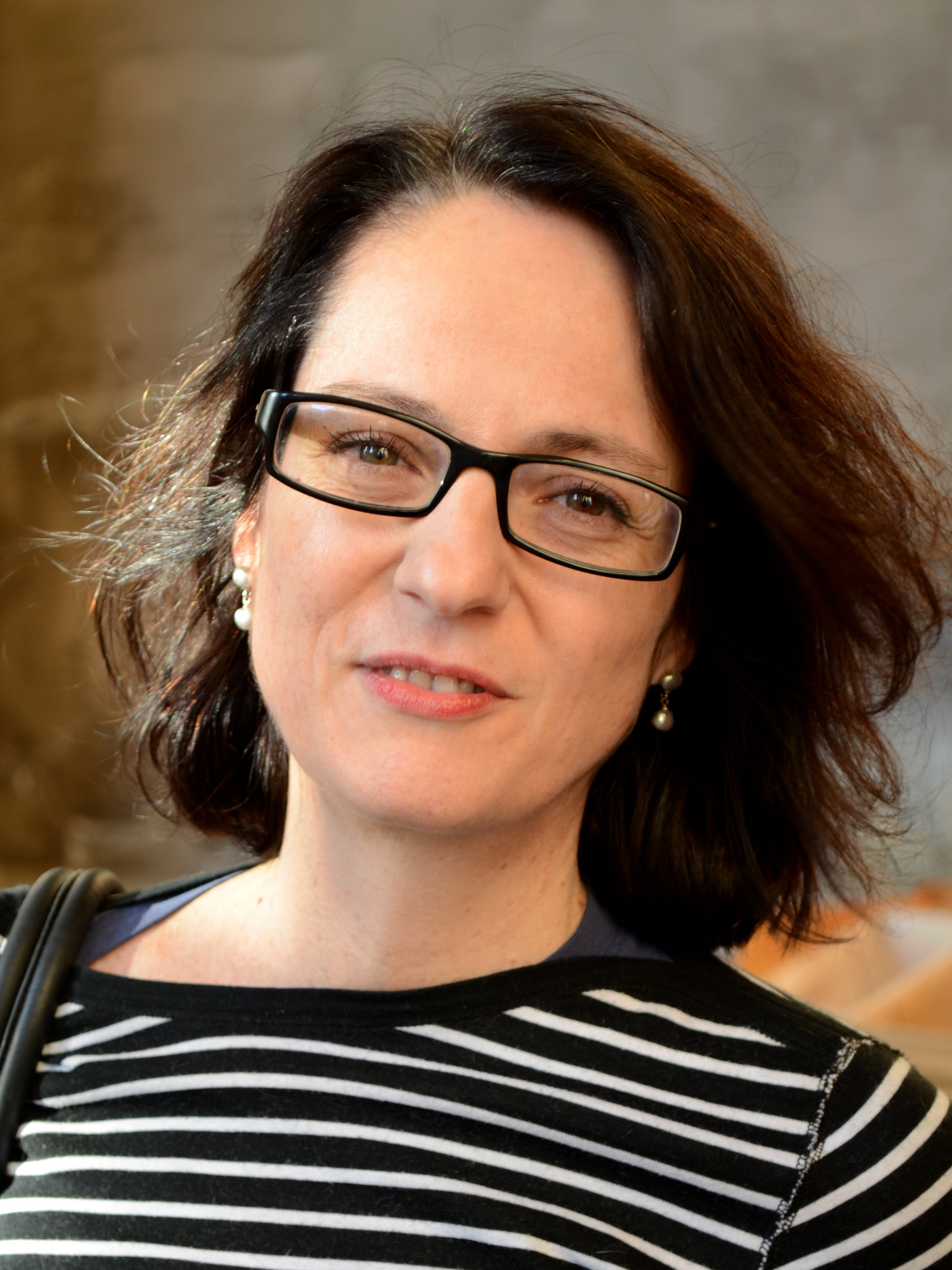
- Marta Sanz, 2014
- Born: Marta Sanz Pastor; 1967 (age 58–59); Madrid, Spain
- Citizenship: Spain
- Education: Universidad Complutense de Madrid
- Writing career
- Notable awards: Premio Herralde Premio Juan Tigre Premio Cálamo

Marta Sanz Pastor (born 1967, Madrid) is a Spanish writer. Her work includes the novels Susana y los viejos (nominated for the Premio Nadal), Daniela Astor y la caja negra (winner of the Premio Juan Tigre and the Premio Cálamo), Los mejores tiempos (winner of the Premio Ojo Crítico de Narrativa). and most recently Farándula which won the 2015 Premio Herralde. She is also a noted poet; among her notable works is the award-winning collection Vintage.

She has written for magazines as Mirlo. She has performed literary criticism for Mercurio, Babelia, and the blog La tormenta en un vaso.
