= Premio Herralde =

Spanish literary award

The Premio Herralde is a Spanish literary prize. It is awarded annually by the publishing house Anagrama to an original novel in the Spanish language. Established in 1983, the prize takes its name from Jorge Herralde, founder of Anagrama. Accompanied by a cash prize, the award is announced every year in November.

== List of winners ==
Year	Author	Country	Title
1983	Álvaro Pombo	Spain	El héroe de las mansardas de Mansard
1984	Sergio Pitol	Mexico	El desfile del amor
1985	Adelaida García Morales	Spain	El silencio de las sirenas
1986	Javier Marías	Spain	El hombre sentimental
1987	Félix de Azúa	Spain	Diario de un hombre humillado
1988	Vicente Molina Foix	Spain	La Quincena Soviética
1989	Miguel Sánchez-Ostiz	Spain	La gran ilusión
1990	Justo Navarro	Spain	Accidentes íntimos
1991	Javier García Sánchez	Spain	La historia más triste
1992	Paloma Díaz-Mas	Spain	El sueño de Venecia
1993	José María Riera de Leyva	Spain	Aves de paso
1994 (tie)	Pedro Zarraluki; Carlos Perellón	Spain; Spain	La historia del silencio La ciudad doble
1995	José Ángel González Sainz	Spain	Un mundo exasperado
1996	Antonio Soler	Spain	Las bailarinas muertas
1997	Jaime Bayly	Peru	La noche es virgen
1998	Roberto Bolaño	Chile	Los detectives salvajes
1999	Marcos Giralt Torrente	Spain	París
2000	Luis Magrinyà	Spain	Los dos Luises
2001	Alejandro Gándara	Spain	Últimas noticias de nuestro mundo
2002	Enrique Vila-Matas	Spain	El mal de Montano
2003	Alan Pauls	Argentina	El pasado
2004	Juan Villoro	Mexico	El testigo
2005	Alonso Cueto	Peru	La hora azul
2006	Alberto Barrera Tyszka	Venezuela	La enfermedad
2007	Martín Kohan	Argentina	Ciencias morales
2008	Daniel Sada	Mexico	Casi nunca
2009	Manuel Gutiérrez Aragón	Spain	La vida antes de marzo
2010	Antonio Ungar	Colombia	Tres ataúdes blancos
2011	Martín Caparrós	Argentina	Los Living
2012	Juan Francisco Ferré	Spain	Karnaval
2013	Álvaro Enrigue	Mexico	Muerte súbita
2014	Guadalupe Nettel	Mexico	Después del invierno
2015	Marta Sanz	Spain	Farándula
2016	Juan Pablo Villalobos	Mexico	No voy a pedirle a nadie que me crea
2017	Andrés Barba	Spain	República luminosa
2018	Cristina Morales (writer)	Spain	Lectura fácil
2019	Mariana Enríquez	Argentina	Nuestra parte de noche
2020	Luisgé Martín	Spain	Cien noches
2021	Javier Pérez Andújar	Spain	El año del Búfalo
2022	Not awarded		
2023	Luis López Carrasco	Spain	El desierto blanco
2024	Cynthia Rimsky Xita Rubert	ChileSpain	Clara y confusa Los hechos de Key Biscayne
2025	Pablo Maurette	Argentina	El contrabando ejemplar

== List of finalists ==
Year	Author	Country	Title
1983	Paloma Díaz-Mas; Álvaro Pombo; Enrique Vila-Matas	Spain; Spain; Spain	El rapto del Santo Grial; El hijo adoptivo Impostura
1984	Miguel Enesco; Rafael Sender; Javier Tomeo	Peru; Spain; Spain	Me llamaré Tadeusz Freyre; Tendrás oro y oro Amado monstruo
1985	Luisa Futoransky; Jorge Ordaz	Argentina; Spain	De Pe a Pa; Prima donna
1986	Roberto Fernández Sastre; Mayra Montero; Evelio Rosero	Uruguay; Cuba; Colombia	La manipulación La trenza de la hermosa luna Juliana los mira
1987	Roberto Fernández Sastre	Uruguay	El turismo infame
1988	Rafael Chirbes	Spain	Mimoun
1989	Felipe Hernández Vélez	Spain	Naturaleza
1990	Luisa Castro	Spain	El somier
1991	Diego Carrasco	Spain	El tesoro japonés
1992	Olga Guirao	Spain	Mi querido Sebastián
1993	Álvaro del Amo	Spain	El horror
1994	Ismael Grasa; Teresa Ruiz Rosas	Spain; Peru	De Madrid al cielo El copista
1995	Eloy Tizón	Spain	Seda salvaje
1996	Pedro Ugarte	Spain	Los cuerpos de las nadadoras
1997	Berta Serra Manzanares	Spain	El otro lado del mundo
1998	Alberto Olmos	Spain	A bordo del naufragio
1999	Andrés Neuman	Argentina; Spain	Bariloche
2000	Pablo d'Ors	Spain	Las ideas puras
2001	Andrés Barba	Spain	La hermana de Katia
2002	Margo Glantz	Mexico	El rastro
2003	Andrés Neuman	Argentina; Spain	Una vez Argentina
2004	Eduardo Berti	Argentina	Todos los Funes
2005	Manuel Pérez Subirana	Spain	Egipto
2006	Teresa Dovalpage	Cuba	Muerte de un murciano en La Habana
2007	Antonio Ortuño	Mexico	Recursos humanos
2008	Iván Thays; Carlos Busqued (semifinalist); Tryno Maldonado (semifinalist); José Morella (semifinalist)	Peru; Argentina; Mexico; Spain	Un lugar llamado Oreja de Perro; Bajo este sol tremendo Temporada de caza para el león negro Asuntos propios
2009	Juan Francisco Ferré	Spain	Providence
2012	Sara Mesa	Spain	Cuatro por cuatro
2014	Manuel Moyano	Spain	El imperio de Yegorov
2015	Miguel Ángel Hernández	Spain	El instante de peligro
2016	Federico Jeanmaire	Argentina	Amores enanos
2017	Diego Vecchio	Argentina	La extinción de las especies
2018	Alejandra Costamagna	Chile	El sistema del tacto
2019	Not awarded		
2020	Federico Falco	Argentina	Los llanos
2021	Daniel Saldaña París	Mexico	El baile y el incendio
2022	Not awarded		
2023	Camila Fabbri	Argentina	La reina del baile
