= Roberto Fernández Sastre =

Uruguayan writer, critic and musician

Roberto Fernández Sastre (born 1951) is an Uruguayan writer, critic and musician. Born in Montevideo, he moved permanently to Barcelona in 1981. His novel La manipulacion was nominated for the Premio Herralde in 1986; he was also nominated the following year for El turismo infame.

Fernández Sastre is also an accomplished drummer.
