= National Literature Prize for Narrative =

Literature prize awarded to Spanish authors

The National Literature Prize for Narrative (Spanish: Premio Nacional de Literatura en la modalidad de Narrativa) is a prize awarded by Spain's Ministry of Culture for a novel written by a Spanish author in any of the languages of Spain. The prize is 20,000 euros.

Prior to 1977, the prize appeared and disappeared several times, being given by different institutions.

== Past winners ==
- 1924 – Huberto Pérez de la Ossa (1897–1983), for La Santa Duquesa
- 1925 – No award
- 1926 – Wenceslao Fernández Flórez (1885–1964), for Las siete columnas
- 1927 – Concha Espina (1º) (1869–1955), for Altar mayor
- 1928 – No award
- 1929 – No award
- 1930 – No award
- 1931 – Mauricio Bacarisse (1895–1931), for Los terribles amores de Agliberto y Celedonia
- 1932 – Alejandro Casona (1903–1965), for Flor de leyendas
- 1933 – No award
- 1934 – No award
- 1935 – Ramón J. Sender (1901–1982), for Míster Witt en el cantón
- 1936 – Ricardo Baroja (1917–1988), for La nao Capitana
- 1937 – No award
- 1938 – No award
- 1939 – No award
- 1940 – No award
- 1941 – No award
- 1942 – No award
- 1943 – Rafael García Serrano (1917–1988), for La fiel Infantería
- 1944 – No award
- 1945 – No award
- 1946 – No award
- 1947 – Vicente Escrivá (1913–1999), for Jornadas de Miguel de Cervantes
- 1948 – Juan Antonio Zunzunegui (1º) (1900–1982), for La úlcera
- 1949 – No award
- 1950 – Concha Espina (1869–1955), for Valle en el mar
- 1952 – José María Sánchez-Silva (1911–2002), for Marcelino pan y vino
- 1953 – José María Gironella (1917–2003), for Los cipreses creen en Dios
- 1954 – Tomás Salvador (1921–1984), for Cuerda de presos
- 1955 – José Luis Castillo-Puche (1919–2004), for Con la muerte al hombro (1º)
- 1956 – Miguel Delibes (1920–2010), for Diario de un cazador (1º)
- 1957 – Carmen Laforet (1921–2004), for La mujer nueva
- 1958 – Alejandro Núñez Alonso (1905–1982), for El lazo de púrpura
- 1959 – Ana María Matute (1925–2014), for Los hijos muertos
- 1960 – Daniel Sueiro (1936–1986), for Los conspiradores
- 1961 – Manuel Halcón (1900–1989), for Monólogos de una mujer fría
- 1962 – Torcuato Luca de Tena (1923–1999), for Embajador en el infierno
- 1963 – Emilio Romero (1917–2003), for Cartas a un príncipe
- 1964 – Salvador García de Pruneda (1912–1996), for La encrucijada de Carabanchel
- 1965 – Ignacio Agustí (1913–1974), for 19 de julio
- 1968 – Carlos Rojas (1928-2020), for Auto de fe
- 1975 – Aquilino Duque (1931–2021), for El mono azul
- 1977 – José Luis Acquaroni (1919–1983), for Copa de sombra
- 1978 – Carmen Martín Gaite (1925–2000), for El cuarto de atrás
- 1979 – Jesús Fernández Santos (1926–1988), for Extramuros
- 1980 – Alonso Zamora Vicente (1916–2006), for Mesa, sobremesa
- 1981 – Gonzalo Torrente Ballester (1910–1999), for La isla de los jacintos cortados
- 1982 – José Luis Castillo-Puche (1919–2004), for Conocerás el poso de la nada (2º)
- 1983 – Francisco Ayala (1906–2009), for Recuerdos y olvidos: 1. El exilio
- 1984 – Camilo José Cela (1916–2002), for Mazurca para dos muertos
- 1985 – It was not awarded
- 1986 – Alfredo Conde (1945), for Xa vai o griffón no vento (Galician)
- 1987 – Luis Mateo Díez (1942), for La fuente de la edad (1º)
- 1988 – Antonio Muñoz Molina (1956), for El invierno en Lisboa (1º)
- 1989 – Bernardo Atxaga (1951), for Obabakoak (Basque)
- 1990 – Luis Landero (1948), for Juegos de la edad tardía
- 1991 – Manuel Vázquez Montalbán (1939–2003), for Galíndez
- 1992 – Antonio Muñoz Molina (1956), for El jinete polaco (2º)
- 1993 – Luis Goytisolo (1935), for Estatua con palomas
- 1994 – Gustavo Martín Garzo (1948), for El lenguaje de las fuentes
- 1995 – Carme Riera (1948), for Dins el darrer blau (Catalan)
- 1996 – Manuel Rivas (1957), for Que me queres, amor? (Galician)
- 1997 – Álvaro Pombo (1939), for Donde las mujeres
- 1998 – Alfredo Bryce Echenique (1939), for Reo de nocturnidad
- 1999 – Miguel Delibes (1920–2010), for El hereje (2º)
- 2000 – Luis Mateo Díez (1942), for La ruina del cielo (2º)
- 2001 – Juan Marsé (1933), for Rabos de lagartija
- 2002 – Unai Elorriaga (1973), for SPrako tranbia (Basque)
- 2003 – Suso de Toro (1956), for Trece badaladas (Galician)
- 2004 – Juan Manuel de Prada (1970), for La vida invisible
- 2005 – Alberto Méndez (1941–2004), for Los girasoles ciegos
- 2006 – Ramiro Pinilla (1923–2014), for Las cenizas del hierro
- 2007 – Vicente Molina Foix (1946), for El abrecartas
- 2008 – Juan José Millás (1946), for El mundo
- 2009 – Kirmen Uribe (1970), for Bilbao-New York-Bilbao (Basque)
- 2010 – Javier Cercas (1962), for The Anatomy of a Moment
- 2011 – Marcos Giralt Torrente (1968), for Tiempo de vida
- 2012 – Javier Marías (1951), for The Infatuations (Los enamoramientos) (rejected)
- 2013 – José María Merino (1942), for El río del Edén
- 2014 – Rafael Chirbes (1949–2015), for En la orilla
- 2015 – Ignacio Martínez de Pisón (1960), for La buena reputación
- 2016 – Cristina Fernández Cubas (1945), for La habitación de Nona
- 2017 – Fernando Aramburu (1959), for Patria
- 2018 – Almudena Grandes (1960) for Los pacientes del Doctor García
- 2019 – Cristina García Morales (1985), for Lectura fácil
- 2020 – Juan Bonilla (1966), for Totalidad sexual del cosmos
- 2021 – Xesús Fraga (1971), for Virtudes (e misterios) (Galician)
- 2022 – Marilar Aleixandre (1947), for As malas mulleres (Galician)
- 2023 - Pilar Adón (1971), for De bestias y aves
- 2024 - Raúl Quinto (1978), for Martinete del rey sombra
- 2025 - Paco Cerdà (1985), for Presentes
