= 10 de 30 =

10 de 30 is a literary project conducted by the Spanish Agency for International Development Cooperation (AECID), with the goal of identifying and promoting the best young writers in Spain. Ten writers are chosen in each edition of "10 de 30", all between the ages of 30 and 40.

== Receivers of the award ==
The project began in 2019, and an anthology featuring the works of the ten selected authors was published, in both Spanish and English. The featured authors in this first edition were:

- Aroa Moreno
- Almudena Sánchez
- Alejandro Morellón
- Inés Martín Rodrigo
- Miguel Barrero
- Pablo Herrán
- Inma López Silva
- Marina Perezagua
- Natàlia Cerezo
- Cristina Morales

The judges were Ernesto Pérez Zuñiga, Luisgé Martín, Cristina Sánchez Andrade, Laura Revuelta and Javier Serena.

A second anthology was published in 2020, featuring a second group of 10 writers. The judges this time were Marcos Giralt Torrente, Clara Obligado, José Ovejero, Nuria Barrios and Javier Serena. They were:

- Aixa de la Cruz
- Katixa Agirre
- Álex Chico
- Florencia del Campo
- Jordi Nopca
- Irene Vallejo
- Cristian Crusat
- Gabriela Ybarra
- Sabina Urraca
- Juan Gómez Bárcena

A third and final edition appeared in 2021. The judges were Valerie Miles, Carlos Zanón, Cristina Fuentes, Carlos Pardo and Javier Serena. The selected authors were:

- Raquel Taranilla
- Munir Hachemi
- Margarita Leoz
- Elena Medel
- David Aliaga
- Irene Solà
- Laura Fernández
- Miqui Otero
- Matías Candeira
- Elisa Ferrer

Several of these writers were also featured by Granta magazine in their selection of promising young Spanish writers, published in 2021.
