= Carmen G. de la Cueva =

Spanish journalist (born 1986)

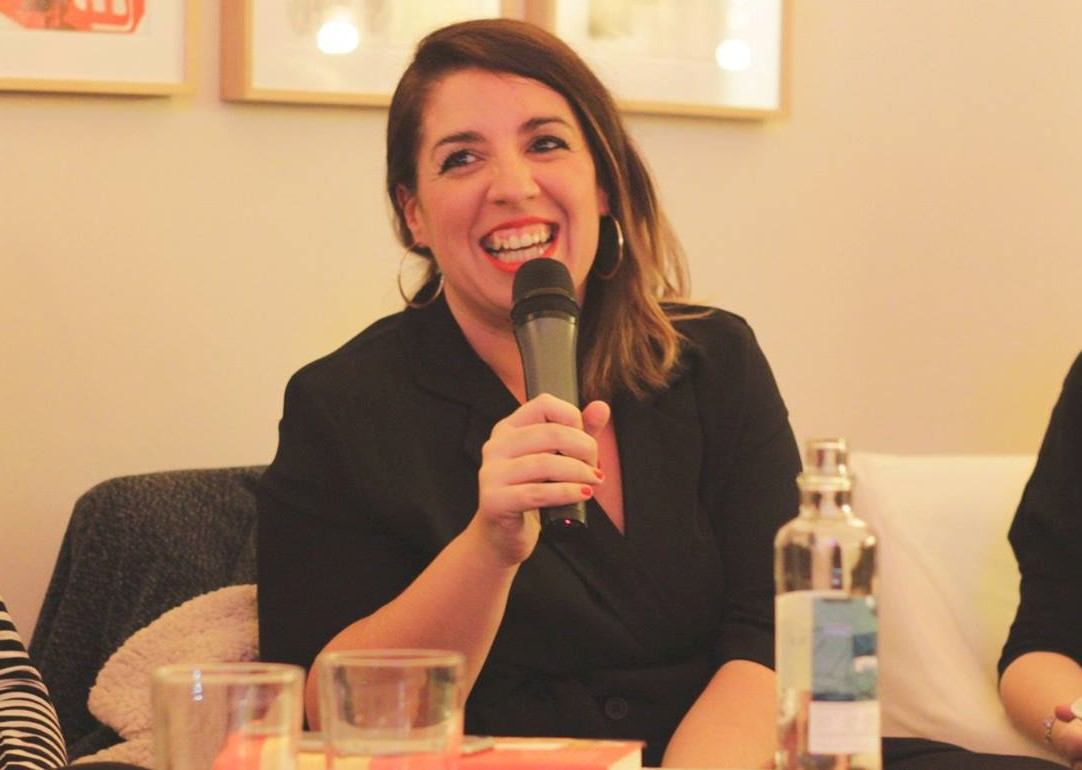
- Born: 1986 (age 39–40); Alcalá del Río, Spain
- Education: University of Seville
- Occupations: Journalist, writer, editor

Carmen G. de la Cueva (born 1986) is a Spanish journalist, writer, and editor. From 2014 to 2019, she directed "La tribu" (The Tribe), a virtual community dedicated to the dissemination of literature written by women. She has published several books, and was director of the feminist publishing house La Señora Dalloway.

== Biography ==
Carmen G. de la Cueva was born in Alcalá del Río in 1986. She holds a licentiate in journalism and a postgraduate degree in comparative literature, both from the University of Seville. She has carried out academic stays at institutions such as the Technical University of Braunschweig in Germany, the National Autonomous University of Mexico, the Spanish embassy in Prague, and the Instituto Cervantes in London. She has written for national newspapers such as 20 minutos, elDiario.es, El Español, and ABC Cultural. She currently contributes to CTXT on a monthly basis. In addition to her role as a journalist, G. de la Cueva teaches workshops on autobiographical literature and feminism.

In 2014, together with writer Ángelo Néstore and visual artist Martín de Arriba, she created the publishing house La Señora Dalloway – named in homage to Virginia Woolf's novel Mrs Dalloway – which specialized in feminist themes. According to its creators, it was born "at a time when feminisms and all queer currents had not yet found a very clear canonical place within literary and cultural production", and they compared it to "a room of one's own", as described by Woolf. Until its closure in 2019, it published La tribu, Preciosa sangre, Nadie me dijo, and a book of poetry by Eva Strittmatter, with illustrations by Martín de Arriba.

In parallel to the publishing house, in 2014, G. de la Cueva created a virtual community focused on the research and dissemination of feminist literature, which she called "La tribu" (The Tribe). For five years, she contributed to the promotion of feminist literature, cinema, and art in what she called – in clear allusion to Virginia Woolf – her own shared room. In September 2017, she organized her first Feminist Reading Club at the Mujeres y Compañía bookstore in Madrid. After its initial success, in which more than 100 people in an hour were interested in attending, editions of the club were created in other Spanish cities: Bilbao, Barcelona, Valencia, Gijón, Seville, Murcia, and Málaga.

In 2016, G. de la Cueva published her first work, Mamá quiero ser feminista (Mama I Want to be a Feminist). This is an autobiography illustrated by the artist Malota. The writer Elvira Lindo said about it:

I have attended those vital and literary chapters feeling identified. It is true that to write something authentic, honest, that is truly born from something very intimate, you have to take risks, and Carmen G. de la Cueva has taken the risk by telling her fears, her complexes, and by drawing herself as a person with edges and contradictions.

In 2017, she organized the First Tribe Feminist Culture Festival, held in collaboration with the Center for Cultural Initiatives of the University of Seville (CICUS). It was an international meeting of feminism in all areas of culture, especially in literature, which brought together professionals from different disciplines, such as Nuria Capdevila-Argüelles, Juana Gallego, Yolanda Domínguez, María Hesse, Alba González Sanz, Nuria Labari, Silvia Nanclares, and María Folguera. The following year, in June 2018, the festival's second edition was held, featuring professionals such as Nuria Varela, Patricia Horrillo, Remedios Zafra, Laura Freixas, and Pilar Bellver.

In 2018, G. de la Cueva published Un paseo por la vida de Simone de Beauvoir (A Walk Through the Life of Simone de Beauvoir), a tour of the biography of the feminist philosopher. In 2019, together with María Folguera, she edited Tranquilas: historias para ir solas por la noche (Quiet: Stories to Go Alone at Night), a book of short stories by María Fernanda Ampuero, Nerea Barjola, Aixa de la Cruz, Jana Leo, Roberta Marrero, Lucía Mbomío, Silvia Nanclares, Edurne Portela Camino, Carme Riera, Marta Sanz, Sabina Urraca, and Gabriela Wiener.

In 2023, she published Escritoras. Una historia de amistad y creación (Writers: A Story of Friendship and Creation), with illustrations by the Sevillian artist Ana Jarén. In it, she writes about the literary and vital work of Spanish authors such as Emilia Pardo Bazán, Carmen Martín Gaite, María Lejárraga, Elena Fortún, and Carmen Laforet.

== Awards and recognition ==
In 2018, G. de la Cueva was a finalist for the 7th Colombine International Journalism Award, sponsored by the Unicaja Foundation and organized by the Association of Journalists-Press Association of Almería (AP-APAL), for her article "La impostora. Un cuarto propio para la Biblioteca de Mujeres de Madrid" (The Impostor: A Room of One's Own for the Madrid Women's Library), published in CTXT.

== Works ==
- Mamá quiero ser feminista [Mama, I Want to be a Feminist]. Editorial Lumen. 2016. ISBN 9788426403834.
- Un paseo por la vida de Simone de Beauvoir [A Walk Through the Life of Simone de Beauvoir]. Editorial Lumen. 2018. ISBN 9788426405371.
- Tranquilas: historias para ir solas por la noche [Quiet: Stories to Go Alone at Night]. Editorial Lumen. 2019. ISBN 9788426407030.
- Escritoras. Una historia de amistad y creación [Writers: A Story of Friendship and Creation]. 2023. ISBN 9788426424761. with illustrations by Ana Jarén
