= Manuel Astur =

Spanish writer and journalist (born 1980)

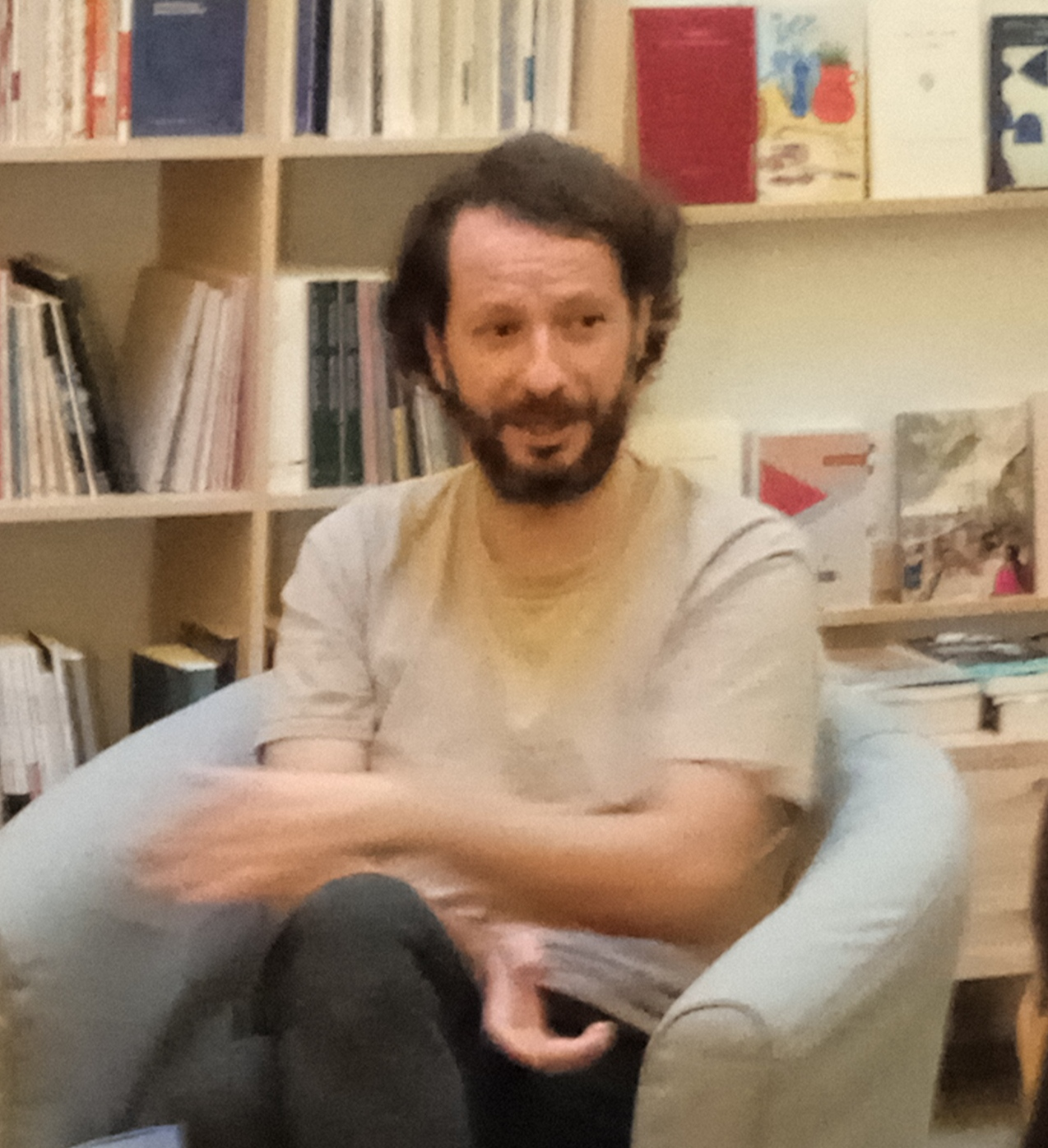
Image of Manuel Astur

Manuel Astur (born 1980) is a Spanish writer and journalist. He teaches literature at the Escuela de Letras de Gijón. Astur has written a number of books, among them:

- Y encima es mi cumpleaños (And It's My Birthday On Top of Everything, 2013, poetry)
- Quince días para acabar con el mundo (Fifteen Days to End the World, 2014, novel)
- ‘Seré un anciano hermoso en un gran país’ (I'll Be a Handsome Old Man in a Great Country, 2015, essay).

His book San, el libro de los milagros (Of Saints and Miracles) was translated into English by Claire Wadie for Peirene Press and New Vessel Press.

== Honours ==
In 2017, Astur was named one of the most promising writers in Europe by the New Voices from Europe initiative from Literary Europe Live. Other writers named were Andrei Dósa (Romania), Arvis Viguls (Latvia), Asja Bakić (Bosnia and Herzegovina), Bronka Nowicka (Poland), Charlotte Van den Broeck (Belgium), Llyr Gwyn Lewis (Wales), Nathalie Ronvaux (Luxembourg), Sophie Divry (France) and Steinunn G. Helgadóttir (Iceland).

In 2016, Astur was also named one of the best young writers in Spanish by ABC Cultural. Other writers named beside Astur were Sara Mesa, Jesús Carrasco, Matías Candeira, Juan Gómez Bárcena, Elena Medel and Gabriela Ybarra.
