= Nerea =

- Gender: Female
- Language: Basque, Spanish

Origin
- Language: Greek

Other names
- See also: Nereus

Nerea is a feminine given name of Greek origin. It is the feminine form of the given name Nereo, which is in turn the Spanish version of Nereus. It also means "mine" in the Basque language.

== Usage ==
This name is widely used in Spanish-speaking countries such as Spain, particularly in the Basque Country. It was the 79th most common name for girls born in Spain in 2022, with 329.

As of 2023, it was the 72nd most common female name in Spain with 68,020 people named Nerea living in the country, with their average age being 22.5 years. This included: 8,381 in the Community of Madrid, 5,555 in the Province of Barcelona, and 5,286 in Biscay.

== People ==
Notable people with the name include:

- Nerea Agüero (born 1997), Spanish-born Argentine footballer
- Nerea Ahedo (born 1966), Spanish politician
- Nerea Alias (born 1984), Spanish journalist, actress and television presenter
- Nerea Alzola, Spanish politician
- Nerea Antia, Spanish politician
- Nerea Apodaka (born 1992), Spanish visual artist
- Nerea Aresti (born 1961), Spanish historian and professor
- Nerea Ariznabarreta Izkue (born 1981), Spanish storyteller and playwright
- Nerea Arrien (born 1976), Spanish writer
- Nerea Arriola (born 1988), Spanish actress
- Nerea Arruti (born 1990), Spanish herri kirolak athlete
- Nerea Azkona (born 1982), Spanish anthropologist, writer, and translator
- Nerea Azurmendi (born 1961), Spanish journalist
- Nerea Balda (born 1975), Spanish writer
- Nerea Barjola, Spanish political scientist, writer, and activist
- Nerea Barros (born 1981), Spanish actress
- Nerea Blanco (born 1987), Spanish philosopher, writer, and science communicator
- Nerea Calvillo (born 1973), Spanish architect and researcher
- Nerea Camacho (born 1996), Spanish actress
- Nerea del Campo Aguirre (born 1971), Spanish philologist
- Nerea Castaño (born 1995), Spanish lawyer
- Nerea Cordeiro (born 1999), Spanish visual artist
- Nerea de Diego (born 1974), Spanish artist and cultural manager
- Nerea Eizagirre (born 2000), Spanish footballer
- Nerea Elizalde (born 1998), Spanish actress, singer and dancer
- Nerea Elustondo (born 1981), Spanish bertsolari
- Nerea Etxegibel (born 1964), Spanish track and field athlete
- Nerea Ezeiza, Spanish computer scientist, researcher, and professor
- Nerea Fernández Cordero (born 1991), Spanish politician
- Nerea Gabirondo (born 1990), Spanish footballer
- Nerea Gálvez (born 1971), Spanish politician
- Nerea Gantxegi (born 1994), Spanish footballer
- Nerea Garmendia (born 1979), Spanish actress and television presenter
- Nerea Gastón (born 1995), Spanish art historian
- Nerea Gorriti (born 1987), Spanish actress and singer
- Nerea Ibarzabal (born 1994), Spanish bertsolari, writer, and journalist
- Nerea Intxausti Castiñeira (born 2000), Spanish journalist and writer
- Nerea Iráculis (born 1968), Spanish lawyer, legal scholar, and professor
- Nerea Irastorza (born 1991), Spanish neuroscientist
- Nerea Iriarte (born 1969), Spanish journalist and television presenter
- Nerea Irigoyen (born 1981), Spanish virologist
- Nerea Kortajarena (born 1974), Spanish politician
- Nerea Lekuona (born 1976), Spanish visual artist
- Nerea Lizarralde, Spanish journalist
- Nerea Llanos (born 1967), Spanish politician
- Nerea Loiola (born 1985), Spanish writer and teacher
- Nerea Lorón (born 1983), real name of Spanish rapper La Furia
- Nerea Martí (born 2002), Spanish racing driver
- Nerea Martin Zubeldia (born 1998), Spanish lawyer
- Nerea Martínez Martín (born 1993), Spanish dancer
- Nerea Martínez Urruzola (born 1972), Spanish triathlete and mountain runner
- Nerea Mazo (born 1998), Spanish actress and singer
- Nerea Melgosa (born 1970), Spanish politician
- Nerea Moldes Bóveda (born 1998), Spanish futsal player
- Nerea Moreno (born 2002), Spanish rhythmic gymnast
- Nerea Mujika (born 1960), Spanish professor and cultural promoter
- Nerea Nevado (born 2001), Spanish footballer
- Nerea Otxoa (born 1977), Spanish rugby union player
- Nerea Pagaldai (born 1993), Spanish biologist and science communicator
- Nerea Pena (born 1989), Spanish handball player
- Nerea Pérez (born 1994), Spanish footballer
- Nerea Perez (born 1997), Spanish rower
- Nerea Reparaz (born 1992), Spanish journalist
- Nerea Riesco (born 1974), Spanish writer and journalist
- Nerea Rodríguez (born 1999), Spanish singer
- Nerea Royo Tierno (born 2001), Spanish actress and singer
- Nerea Sancho (born 1978), Spanish psychologist, sexologist, and writer
- Nerea Sanfe (born 1992), Spanish DJ, YouTuber, and television presenter
- Nerea Sorondo (born 1987), Spanish herri kirolak athlete
- Nerea Torres (born 1972), Spanish businesswoman
- Nerea Txapartegi Madariaga (born 1961), Spanish Basque nationalist and activist
- Nerea Ubieto (born 1984), Spanish cultural manager and art critic
- Nerea Urbizu (born 1980), Spanish musician
- Nerea Uriagereka (born 1983), Spanish footballer
- Nerea Zusberro (born 1992), Spanish sports journalist and broadcaster

== See also ==
- Nerea, Italian ferry
- Maldita Nerea (Darn Nerea), Spanish pop rock band
