= Freixas =

Freixas is a surname. Notable people with the surname include:

- Anna Freixas (born 1946), Spanish feminist writer and retired university professor
- Carlos Freixas (1923-2003), Spanish cartoonist and illustrator
- Cesk Freixas (born 1984), Catalan singer-songwriter
- Laura Freixas (born 1958), Spanish novelist, short story writer and newspaper columnist
- Narcisa Freixas (1859–1926), Catalan sculptor, painter and composer
