= Premio Tusquets de Novela =

Spanish literary prize

- Awarded for: Novels in Spanish language
- Country: Spain; Mexico
- Presented by: Tusquets Editores
- First award: 2005 - current
- Website: http://www.tusquetseditores.com/premios/novela

Premio Tusquets de Novela (Eng. Tusquets Novel Prize) is a literary prize promoted by the Spanish Tusquets Editores, for writers in Spanish language. First awarded in the 2005 Feria Internacional del Libro de Guadalajara.

The prize consists of a financial award, which in 2012 was 20.000 euros, as well as a small bronze statue designed by the sculptor Joaquim Camps. The work is published simultaneously in Argentina, Spain and Mexico.

In its brief history there have been no winners in 2005 and 2008.

== Prize winners ==
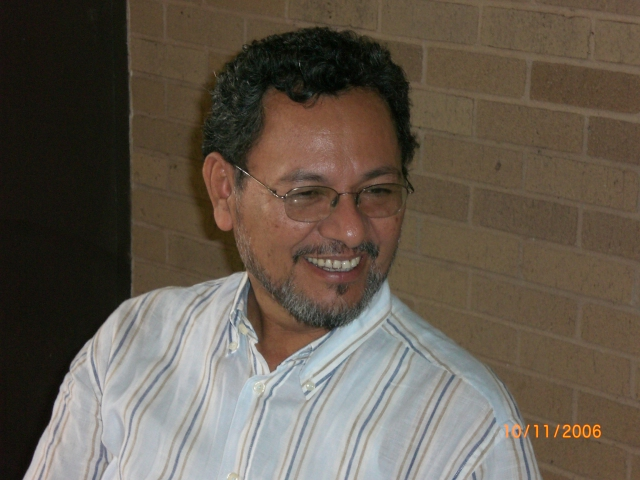
Élmer Mendoza

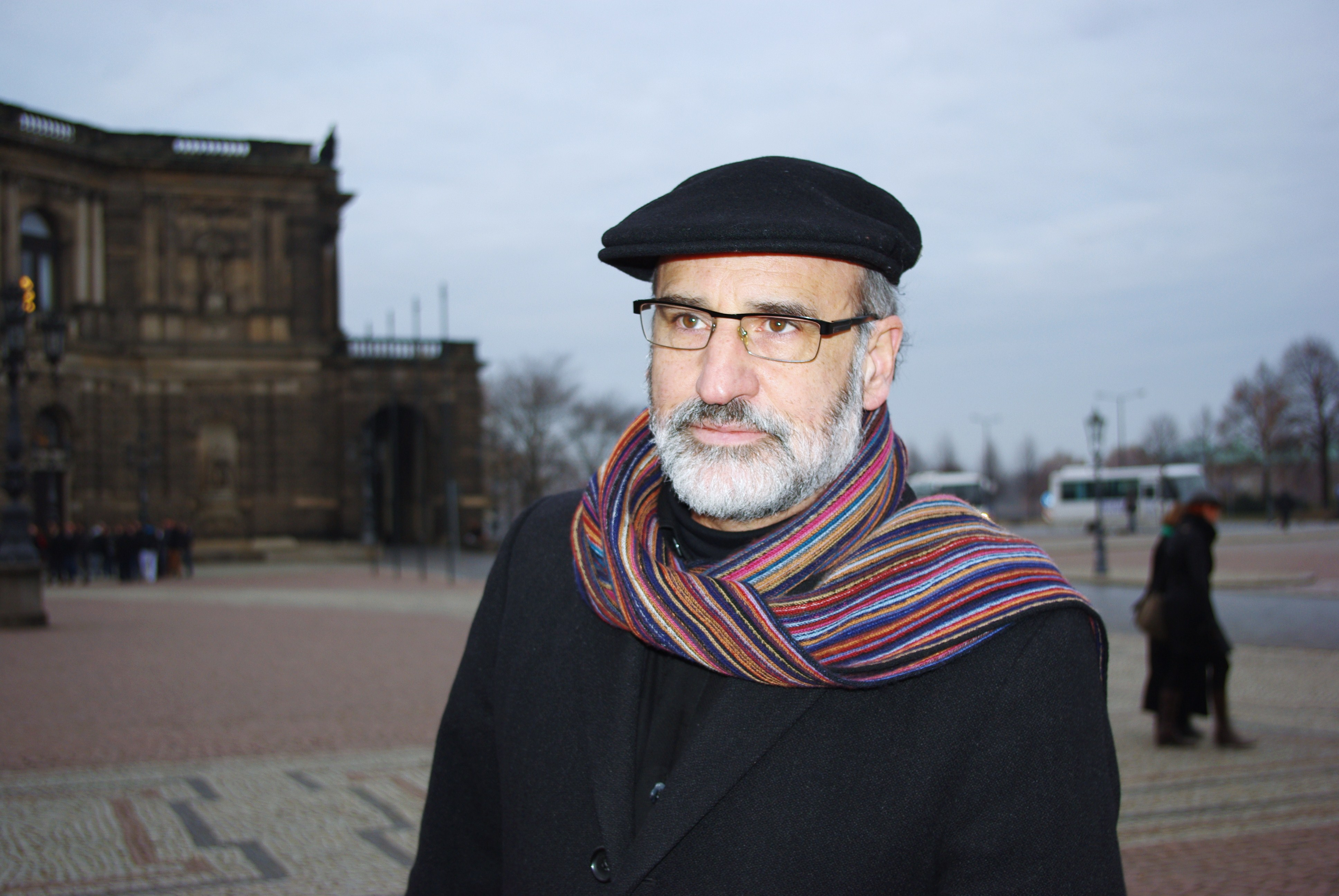
Fernando Aramburu

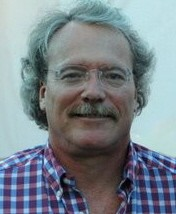
Alberto Barrera Tyszka

Year	Country	Prize novel	Author
2005	No prizewinner		
2006	Colombia	Los ejércitos	Evelio Rosero
2007	Mexico	Balas de plata	Élmer Mendoza
2008	No prizewinner		
2009	Argentina	Oscura monótona sangre	Sergio Olguín
2010	Spain	Todo esta perdonado	Rafael Reig
2011	Spain	Años lentos	Fernando Aramburu
2012	Argentina	Las poseídas	Betina González
2013	Spain	Los gatos pardos	Ginés Sánchez
2014	Spain	La máquina del porvenir	Juan Trejo
2015	Venezuela	Patria o muerte	Alberto Barrera Tyszka
2016	Spain	La gran ola	Daniel Ruiz García
2017	Argentina	Una casa junto al Tragadero	Mariano Quirós
2018	Spain	Nada que no sepas	María Tena
2019	Spain	Temporada de avispas	Elisa Ferrer
2020	Spain	Dicen los síntomas	Bárbara Blasco
2021	Spain	Leña menuda	Marta Barrio

=== Prize finalists ===
Year	Country	Prize novel	Author
2009	Spain	Cuadrante Las Planas	Willy Uribe
