= Leoz (surname) =

Leoz is a surname. Notable people with the surname include:

- Iosu Goñi Leoz (born 1990), Spanish handball player
- Jesús García Leoz (1904–1953), Spanish composer
- Margarita Leoz (born 1980), Spanish critic and writer
- Nicolás Leoz (1928–2019), Paraguayan football administrator
