= Andrea Abreu =

Spanish writer (born 1995)

Andrea Abreu López
- Born: Andrea Abreu López; January 10, 1995 (age 31); Icod de los Vinos, Tenerife, Spain
- Education: University of La Laguna (Degree in Journalism), Universidad Rey Juan Carlos (Master's degree in Cultural Journalism)
- Occupations: Novelist; Journalist; Former retail clerk
- Writing career
- Genres: Literary costumbrismo; LGBT literature; Coming-of-age
- Notable work: Dogs of Summer (2020)

Andrea Abreu López (January 10, 1995, Icod de los Vinos, Tenerife, Spain) is a Spanish writer from the Canary Islands. She published the poetry collection Mujer sin párpados (literally Woman with no eyelids) in 2017, and the fanzine Primavera que sangra (Bleeding Spring) in 2020. Also in 2020, her debut novel Panza de burro was published by Sabina Urraca. The book was a massive hit and therefore optioned for translations in various languages, including English (the title being translated as Dogs of Summer).

In 2021, she was named by Granta magazine as one of the best young writers in the Spanish language.

== Career ==
Andrea Abreu was born in the town of Icod de los Vinos, belonging to Santa Cruz de Tenerife, on the island of Tenerife, Canary Islands. She has had a passion for writing since childhood; at the age of ten, she won the school poetry prize Emeterio Gutiérrez Albelo. Her interest in poetry led her to take a poetry course with Coriolano González at the Canary School of Literary Creation.

She studied Journalism at the University of La Laguna (ULL). In 2017, she moved to Madrid to pursue a master's degree in Cultural Journalism and New Trends at the Universidad Rey Juan Carlos.

As a journalist, she has contributed to various media outlets, including 20minutos.es, Tentaciones (El País), Oculta Lit, LOLA (BuzzFeed), Quimera, and Vice.

Abreu's texts have been published in various digital and print magazines, and her stories have appeared in some anthologies. She published a fanzine, Primavera que sangra, and a poetry book, Mujer sin párpados, before venturing into narrative with Panza de burro. Additionally, her poems have been published in several specialized magazines such as Círculo de Poesía, La tribu de Frida, or La Galla Ciencia.

Her debut novel, Panza de burro, (literally Donkey Belly, a Canarian localism for the dense clouds that typically form in the north of the islands) is written in a plain and straightforward language that, with Canary Islands vocabulary and phonetics, naturally describes the rural and real life on the island. It narrates the friendship between two girls as they transition from childhood to adolescence, with the presence and narrative influence of Teide, although it is not explicitly mentioned in the novel. Abreu uses this context to depict the "description of misery," that of Spain in the early 2000s. "It's something substantial in my life and in the book. It's like a kind of announcement of life's inevitability. When you live near one, you don't constantly think it's going to explode, but you do get the idea that it could. It's the constant presence of death, beautiful and terrible at the same time, which carries a lot of weight within the book. Something bad is about to happen," she says.

The novel Panza de burro was edited by writer Sabina Urraca, who also wrote the book's foreword. The book has been published in thirty countries and translated into English, Italian, German, and French. Furthermore, over 20,000 copies of the novel have been sold, it is in its seventeenth edition, and the rights have been sold for a film adaptation. In 2022, the English translation titled Dogs of Summer was published, translated by Julia Sanches.

Andrea Abreu has been selected by the British magazine Granta as one of the top 25 writers of her generation.

Andrea Abreu is a frequent participant in literary events, such as the poetry festival Cosmopoética in Cordoba, and she has been the co-director of the Young Poetry Festival in Alcalá de Henares.
