= Arvis =

- Gender: Male
- Name day: 10 October

Origin
- Region of origin: Latvia

Other names
- Related names: Arvīds

Arvis is a Latvian masculine given name. It was first registered in Latvian territory in Preiļi in 1874, but entered the calendar only in 1952. Its name day is celebrated on 10 October. In 2023, 1574 men with this name Arvji were registered in Latvia.

Notable people with this name include:

- Arvis Liepiņš (born 1990), Latvian cross-country skier and Olympic competitor
- Arvis Piziks (born 1969), Latvian professional road bicycle racer
- Arvis Viguls (born 1967), Latvian poet and translator
- Arvis Vilkaste (born 1989), Latvian bobsledder
