= Edurne (disambiguation) =

Edurne, full name Edurne García Almagro (born 1985) is a Spanish singer, actress, and TV presenter.

Edurne may also refer to:

- Edurne Ganem, known professionally as Edy Ganem, Mexican-Lebanese actress
- Edurne Pasaban (born 1973), Spanish mountaineer
- Edurne Portela (born 1974), Spanish historian, philologist, professor, and writer
- Edurne Uriarte, Spanish politician, political scientist, and sociologist
- Edurne (album), debut album of the singer Edurne
