= Katie Whittemore =

Spanish-English translator

Katie Whittemore is a Spanish-English translator from the United States, living in Valencia, Spain.

In 2005 she earned her BA from the University of New Hampshire and went on to earn an MPhil from Cambridge University and an MA in Spanish at Middlebury College.

== Career ==
In 2022 she received the National Endowment for the Arts' Literary Translation Fellowship to support her translation of In Case We Lose Power by Lara Moreno. Her translations have been published in numerous literary magazines and journals including The Los Angeles Review, InTranslation, and Two Lines. In 2018 she attended the Bread Loaf Translators' Conference and became part of the conference staff in the following year.

Her translation of Not Even the Dead by Juan Gómez Bárcena was featured on the New York Times 100 Notable Books of 2023. Other translations have been shortlisted for the Queen Sofia Translation Prize, the Cercador Prize, the National Translation Award, and the Spain-USA Foundation Translation award. In 2025, her translation of Un Amor by Sara Mesa was nominated for the Dublin Literary Award.

== Translations ==
- Four by Four by Sara Mesa (Open Letter Books, 2020)
- The Communist's Daughter by Aroa Moreno Durán (Tinder Press, 2020)
- World's Best Mother by Nuria Labari (World Editions, 2021)
- Last Words on Earth by Javier Serena (Open Letter Books, 2021)
- Wolfskin by Lara Moreno (Structo Press, 2022)
- Bad Handwriting by Sara Mesa (Open Letter Books, 2022)
- Not Even the Dead by Juan Gómez Bárcena (Open Letter Books, 2023)
- Pharmakon by Almudena Sánchez (Fum D'Estampa Press, 2023)
- The Strangers by Jon Bilbao (Dalkey Archive Press, 2023)
- Of Beasts and Fowls by Pilar Adón (Open Letter Books, 2024)
- Un Amor by Sara Mesa (Peirene Press, 2024)
- Attila by Aliocha Coll (Open Letter Books, 2025)
- The City by Lara Moreno (Open Letter Books, 2026)
- The Family by Sara Mesa (Peirene Press, 2026)
