= Arvīds =

- Gender: Male
- Name day: 10 October

Origin
- Region of origin: Latvia

Other names
- Related names: Arvis

Arvīds is a Latvian masculine given name and may refer to:

- Arvīds Bārda (1901–1940), Latvian footballer
- Arvīds Brastiņš (1893–1984), Latvian sculptor, writer and neopagan leader
- Arvīds Brēdermanis (1900–1970), Latvian official and founder of the Latvian Scouting movement
- Arvīds Immermanis (1912–1947), Latvian cyclist and Olympic competitor
- Arvīds Jansons (1914–1984,) Latvian conductor
- Arvīds Jurgens (1905–1955), Latvian footballer, ice hockey, basketball and bandy player
- Arvīds Ķibilds (1895–1980), Latvian track and field athlete
- Arvīds Ozols-Bernē (1888–19??), Latvian track and field athlete
- Arvīds Pelše (1899–1983), Latvian Soviet politician, functionary, and historian
- Arvīds Reķis (born 1979), Latvian ice hockey defenceman
- Arvīds Tālavs (1906–1992), Latvian chess player
