= Clanners =

Spanish children's TV series

- Country of origin: Spain
- Original language: Spanish

Production
- Production companies: Ink Apache; Radio Televisión Española (RTVE); Selecta Visión

Original release
- Network: Clan

Clanners is a Spanish children's animated short-form series aired on Televisión Española's Clan channel produced in 2011 and 2012. It debuted on 23 May 2011.

The series focuses on the fictional inhabitants of a parallel universe which are called Clanners; the first Clanner was created when a human DNA molecule merged with a quantum of electromagnetic energy inside a computer. This similarly happened with other types of DNA molecules and electronics, thus creating the Clanners and their world. The Clanners have traits of humans, animals or robots, and have a curiosity of the human world. The Clanners are divided into four tribes: Minisapiens (humanoid beings), Biotron (beings with characteristic animal features), Amorfix (beings made of liquid), and iTrops (futuristic robots), but are nevertheless together. One of the Clanners, Render, is the only one that can access the human world, and will bring any object to the Clanners world that interests him and for others to learn from.

The band Maldita Nerea recorded a song titled "Bienvenido a nuestro Clan" for the show. El Chojin and La Oreja de Van Gogh also contributed to the show's first music album. India Martínez sings the song "Mi mejor regalo eres tu" included on the second album Suma y sigue.

The show won the Mejor Personaje Infantil award at the 2012 Festival El Chupete.

== Characters ==
- Render is a yellow minisapien who resembles a robot with blue eyes and a blue backpack. He's the only Clanner who can access the human world. He is able to fly using his propeller with blue rodors, and he can communicate using the human language.
- eCocó is a minisapien who resembles a human girl with red hair and wears a pink cat costume. She also speaks the human language, has a talent for music and wants to protect the environment. She's part of a trio with eComix and eCoré, where she's the leader.
- eComix is a minisapien who has blonde hair and wears a green mouse costume.
- eCoré is a minisapien who has dark skin and black hair and wears a purple dog costume.
- Doctor OnOff is a minisapien who is a mad scientist. He's a cylindrical-headed figure who has light-purple skin, a typical white lab coat, black pants, black gloves with long fingers, a black mask, and a power symbol adorned on a large, metallic container of green slime on his head. Also capable of speaking the human language, he builds machines and experiments, and wants to conquer the Clanner world, and the human world as well. Despite that, he can get ill-tempered.
- Perlita is a small, yellow biotron who resembles a nautilus. She is playful and mischievous, and lives in a white shell that resembles a human skull with an evil eye. She communicates with laughing and also electronical sea animal sounds.
- Fredo is a biotron who resembles a pig with a skin color reminiscent of a white human being, a body shape resembling a sphere, pointy, green hair, and long, rabbit-like ears. His attire includes large sunglasses and a black vest. He is rock-fashioned and rides his own vehicles, the Fredomoto (a motorcycle), the Fredoneta (a van) and the Fredoavión (a plane).
- Rey Ceviche is a biotron who's big, resembles a Mexican luchador, has blue liquid covering his body, and his arms resemble those of a gorilla while his head and torso are those of a yellow fish with sharp teeth and its bottom exposed, revealing a single bone. He communicates with fish sounds using a low voice, which go like the word "glub". Despite being slow-witted, he bears super strength with his arms and creates art.
- Capitán Memo is a three-eyed amorfix who's made of green liquid and wears a red spacesuit with a jetpack on it and a red mask that covers his eyes. He wants to be a superhero despite being unlucky and lacking superpowers. He always shouts his name when a problem has happened or someone needs help, which is common for what superheroes do.
- Débora is an amorfix who's cyan and slug-like with what appear to be tentacles on her head resembling long hair or dog ears and eyes that are distinct to one another (one blank-white with a single eyelash, and another huge with a reddish-orange pupil), wearing a large top hat with a pink, barrel-like top with a strawberry on it and a white bottom, which resembles a bucket of yogurt. Having a voracious appetite, she transforms into a monstrous, eel-like form in order to eat. In addition to that, she also appears to be cheerful, calm and timid.
- iPé is an iTrop who resembles a humanoid robot with orange and garnet colors and a face that glows green. She is intelligent, and she can fly and speak the human language.
- Bit, Bip and Bop are three tall, identical, playful iTrops who resemble robots with very long limbs, squared heads and only one eye in each one. Bit is yellow, Bip is green, and Bop is blue. They can also speak the human language.
