= Rafael Reig =

Spanish writer (born 1967)

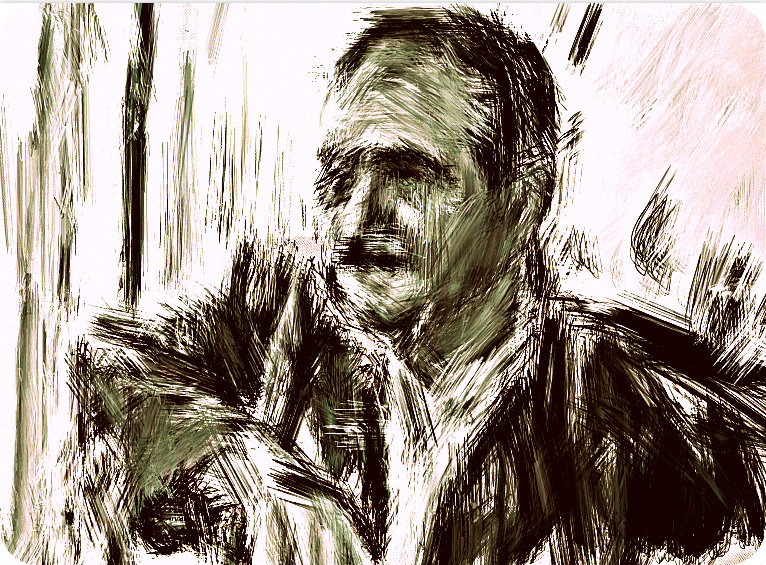
- Born: September 16, 1967; Cangas de Onís, Asturias, Spain
- Occupations: Novelist, essayist, critic
- Writing career
- Genres: Science fiction, postmodernism, detective fiction, essay
- Website: www.hotelkafka.com/blogs/rafael_reig

Rafael Reig is a Spanish writer born in Asturias in 1963. He studied philosophy and humanities in Madrid, and then in New York City, completing his PhD in literature on 19th century literary depictions of prostitution.

His novels are Guapa de cara (A Pretty Face), Blood on the Saddle (2006 Duncan Lawrie International Dagger), both translated into English (Serpent's Tail), and Todo esta perdonado, winner of the 2010 Premio Tusquets de Novela. He works as an academic and critic.

== Bibliography ==
- Esa oscura gente (1990)
- La fórmula Omega (Lengua de trapo, 1998)
- Sangre a borbotones (Lengua de trapo, 2002); translated into English as 'Blood on the Saddle' (Serpent's Tail, 2006)
- Guapa de cara (Lengua de trapo, 2003); translated into English as 'A pretty face' (Profile Books, 2007)
- Autobiografía de Marilyn Monroe (Lengua de trapo, 2005)
- Hazañas del capitán Carpeto (Lengua de trapo, 2005)
- Manual de literatura para caníbales (Debate, 2006)
