= Florencia del Campo =

Florencia del Campo (born 1982) is an Argentine-Spanish writer. She was born and raised in Buenos Aires. She moved to Madrid in 2013, and has since pursued her literary career in Spain. She was named by the 10 de 30 project as one of the best young writers in Spain.

== Selected works ==
- La huésped (2016)
- Madre mía (2017)
- La versión extranjera (2019)
- ¿Y si no entro en este libro? (2014)
- A los saltos (2014)
- Animanzas (2015)
- Que tenga una casa (2024)
