= Structo =

British literary magazine

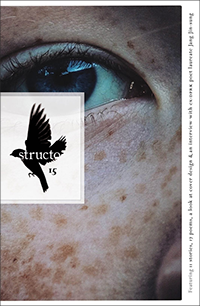
- Cover of Structo 15
- Categories: Literature Poetry
- Frequency: Bi-annual
- Founder: Euan Monaghan
- Founded: 2008
- First issue: 22 September 2008
- Country: United Kingdom
- Language: English
- Website: www.structomagazine.co.uk
- ISSN: 2044-8244

Structo is a British literary magazine, founded in 2008 by the current editor Euan Monaghan. The magazine publishes fiction and poetry, as well as art, essays, and interviews.

== Interviews ==
Each issue of the magazine includes long-form interviews with authors and others. Interviewees have included Richard Adams, Margaret Atwood, Iain Banks, Vera Chok, David Constantine, Lindsey Davis, Stella Duffy, Steven Hall, Daniel Handler, David Gaffney, Jang Jin-sung, Ursula K. Le Guin, Zaffar Kunial, Ken Liu, Inez Lynn & Aimée Heuzenroeder, Ian R. MacLeod, Chris Meade, Tivon Rice, Kim Stanley Robinson, Oscar Schwartz, Sjón, Sarah Thomas, Katie Waldegrave and Evie Wyld.

== Structo Press ==
Structo Press was founded in 2016 to publish chapbooks by contributors to Structo magazine. It has since grown to publish books, primarily in translation. These include the story collection El Llano in flames by Mexican author Juan Rulfo (2019, translated by Stephen Beechinor) and the novel Wolfskin by Spanish author Lara Moreno (2022, translated by Katie Whittemore).

== See also ==
- List of literary magazines
