= Inma López Silva =

Spanish writer

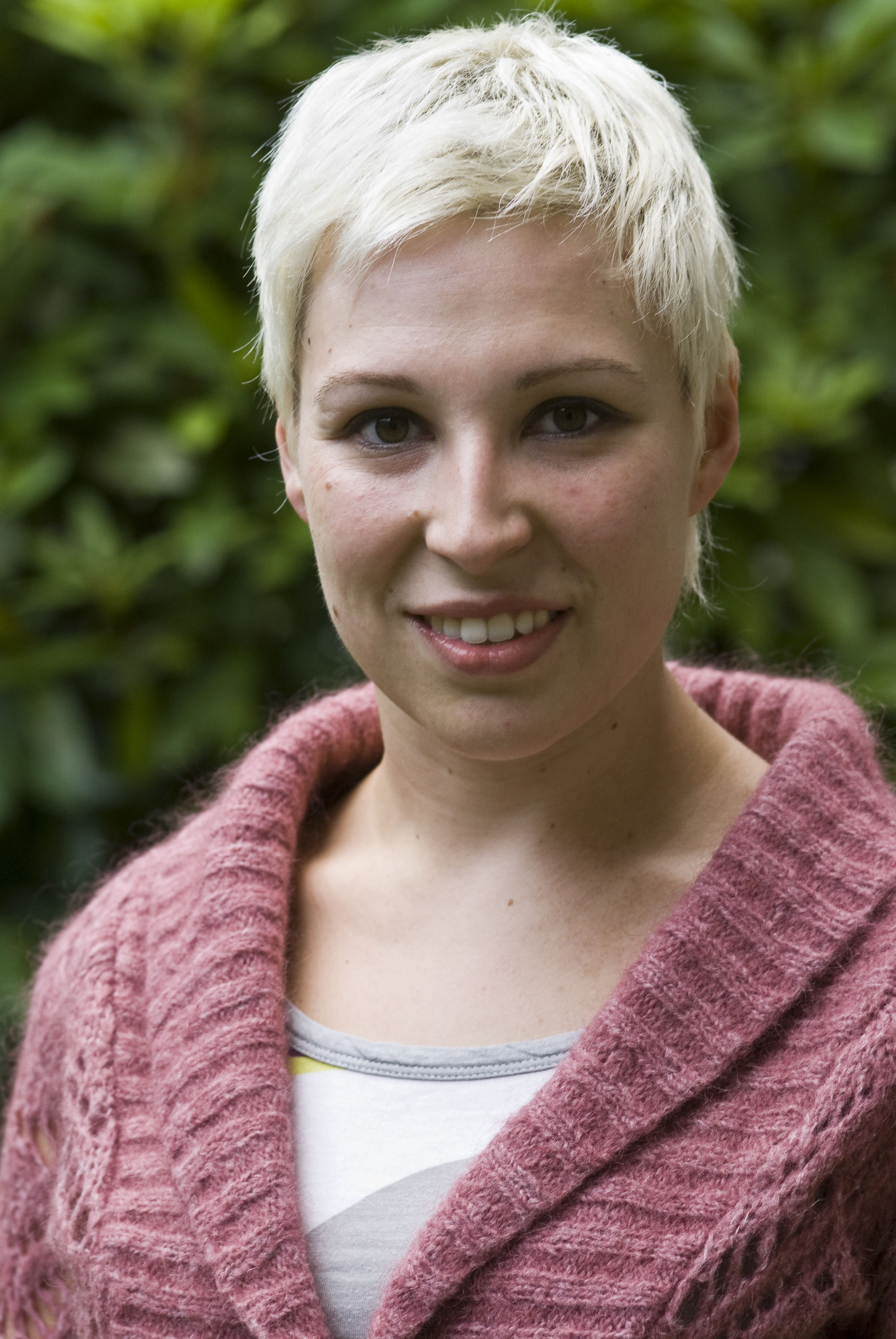
Photograph of Inma López Silva

Inma López Silva is a Spanish writer. She was born in 1978 in Santiago de Compostela. She writes primarily in the Galician language. She is the author of more than a dozen books, notable among which are the novels Concubinas, Neve en abril and Memoria de cidades sen luz. These books have won a number of literary awards in Spain.

Lopez Silva also publishes non-fiction and translations. She has translated Albert Camus and Jean Genet among others. She also works as a theatre critic and a teacher at drama school.

In 2019, she was named by the 10 de 30 project as one of the best young writers in Spain.
