= Maldita Nerea =

Spanish pop rock band

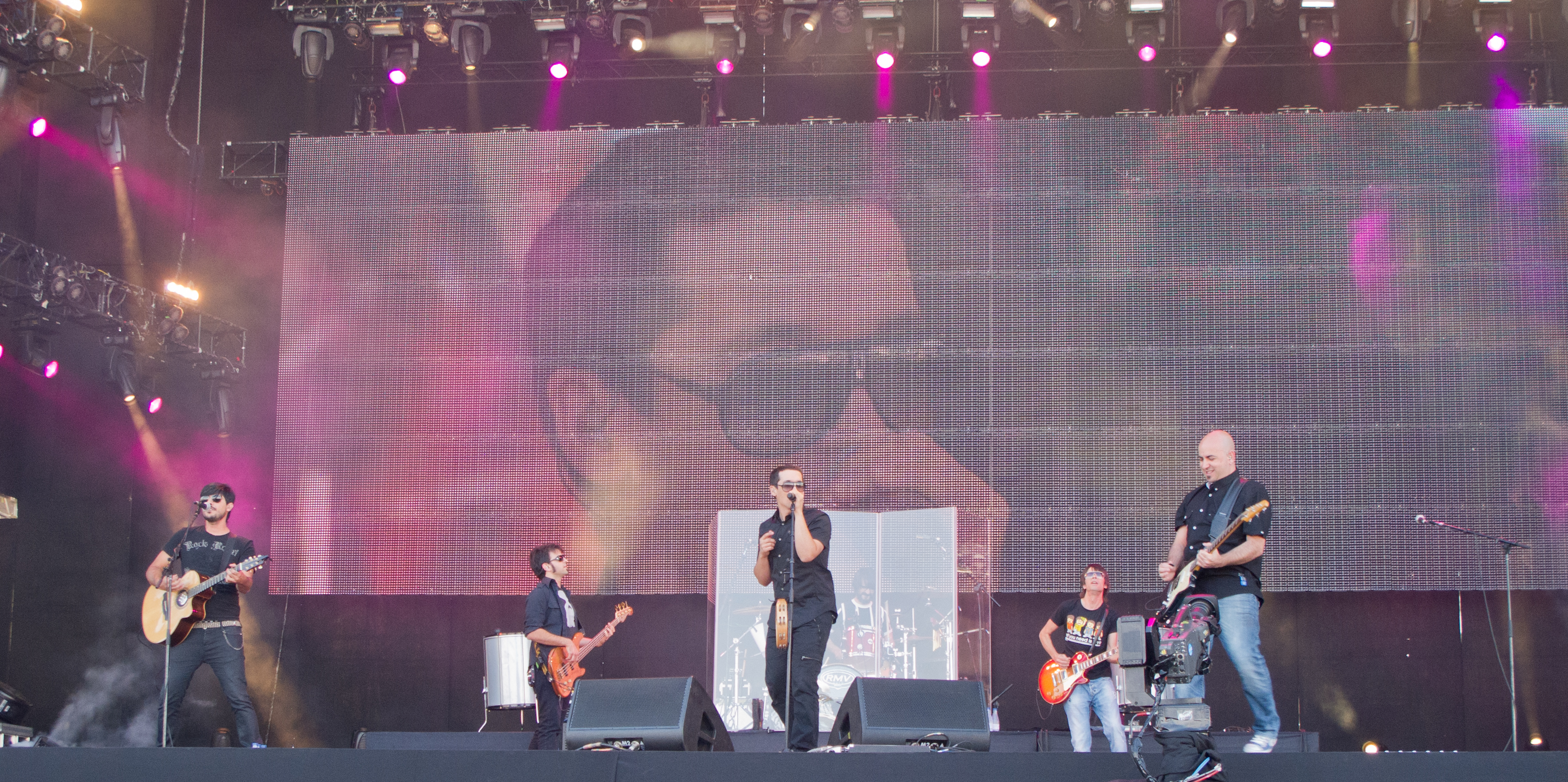
- Maldita Nerea in Madrid, 2012

Background information
- Origin: Murcia, Spain
- Genres: Rock, pop rock, folk pop, folk rock, pop
- Years active: 2003–present
- Labels: Rosevil (self-released), Universal, Sony
- Members: Jorge Ruiz; Luis Gómez; Jordi Armengol; Pedro Carrillo; Tato Latorre; Sergio Moriera
- Website: www.malditanerea.com

Maldita Nerea (English: Darn Nerea) is a Spanish pop/rock band.

== History ==
The group originated in Murcia. They started with small concerts in the city and then Salamanca, where Jorge moved to continue his studies of speech therapy. These concerts were successful and the band became popular.

They attracted the attention of Universal Music and in October 2003, their debut album Cuarto creciente was released. In 2007, following the first album and their departure from Universal, Jorge Ruiz decided that the next release would be self-published. Called El secreto de las tortugas, it was released on "Cuarto Creciente Producciones". In 2009 they released the album Es un secreto... No se lo digas a nadie, which featured remastered versions of previously released songs.

During 2010, the band had a hit with the song "Cosas que suenan a..." which reached number 1 on iTunes (in Spain) and was credited as iTunes Song of the Year.

In 2011, they released their album Fácil and announced a tour of Spain and an additional date in London. In that year, they recorded the song "Bienvenidos a nuestro Clan" for the TVE Clan shorts programme Clanners.

The band's 2017 single "Bailarina", from the album of the same name, was chosen as the official anthem of the 72nd edition of the Vuelta a España cycling race and was performed live at the team presentation on 17 August 2017 in Nîmes. The video for the song was also shot there.

== Members ==
Original members

- Jorge Ruiz – vocals and writer
- Luis Gómez – guitar
- Carlos Molina – bass
- Sergio Bernal – drums

Current members

- Jorge Ruiz – vocals and writer
- Luis A. Gómez – guitar
- Jordi Armengol – guitar
- Pedro A. Carrillo – bass
- Tato Latorre – guitar
- Serginho Moreira – drums

== Discography ==
- Cuarto Creciente (2003)
- El secreto de las tortugas (2007)
- Maldita Maqueta (2004)
- Es un secreto... No se lo digas a nadie (2009)
- Fácil (2011)
- Mira dentro (2014)
- Bailarina (2017)
- Un planeta llamado nosotros (2020) No. 1 Spain

== Awards ==
=== 40 Principales Awards ===
Los Premios 40 Principales of music, are some awards created in 2006 by the radio station Los 40 Principales, to celebrate the 40th anniversary of the foundation of the station.

Year	Candidate	Category	Result
2010	Maldita Nerea	Best New Artist in 40 Principales	Winner
2010	Maldita Nerea	Best group	Winner
2010	"Cosas que suenan a..."	Best Song	Winner
2010	"El secreto de las tortugas"	Best music video	Nominated
2010	Gira "El secreto de las tortugas"	Best festival, tour or concert	Nominated
2011	"Fácil"	Best album	Winner
2011	Maldita Nerea	Best artist or group	Nominated
2011	"Fácil"	Best tour	Nominated
2012	Gira "Mucho + Fácil"	Best tour	Nominated
2014	"Mira Dentro"	Best music video	Nominated

=== Lo que de Verdad Importa Awards ===
Year	Candidate	Category	Result
2014	Mira Dentro	Algo + que una canción	Winner

=== Cadena 100 Awards ===
Year	Candidate	Category	Result
2011	Maldita Nerea	Los número 1 de Cadena 100	Winner

=== Neox Fan Awards ===
Year	Candidate	Category	Result
2013	Maldita Nerea	El grupazo	Nominated
