= Miguel Barrero =

Spanish musician, producer and luthier

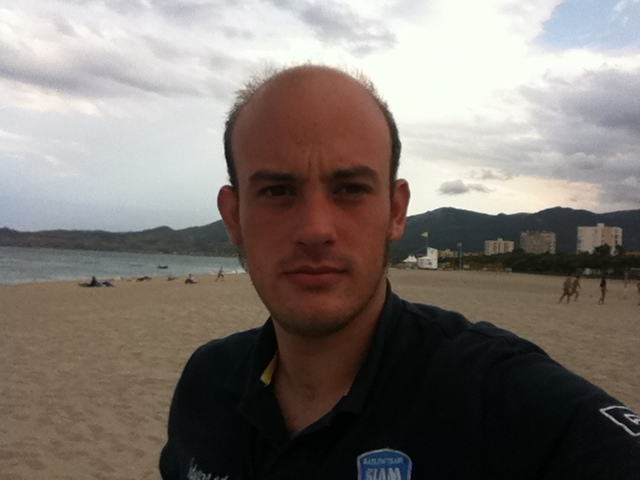
Image of Miguel Barrero

Miguel Barrero (born 1980) is a Spanish writer. He was born in Oviedo.

He has published the following novels:

- Espejo (winner of the Premio Asturias Joven)
- La vuelta a casa
- Los últimos días de Michi Panero (winner of the Premio Juan Pablo Forner)
- La existencia de Dios
- Camposanto en Collioure (winner of the Prix International de Littérature de la Fondation Antonio Machado)
- La tinta del calamar (winner of the Premio Rodolfo Walsh)
- El rinoceronte y el poeta

He has also published a travel book Las tierras del fin del mundo and a collection of articles Siempre de paso. He contributes to a range of papers and journals, among them El País, La Vanguardia, Qué Leer, Librújula, Zenda, Cuadernos Hispanoamericanos, etc.

He was named in the 10 de 30 program by AECID, designed to identify the best young writers in Spain.
