= Almudena Sánchez =

Spanish writer

Almudena Sánchez (born 1985) is a Spanish writer. She was born in Andratx, Mallorca. She studied journalism and creative writing at university. She now works as a journalist, and contributes to Ámbito Cultural among other outlets.

Her first book of short stories La acústica de los iglús appeared in 2016, and was a critical hit. It has been through many editions, and was also published in Latin America (by Odelia Editora of Argentina). The book was nominated for the Setenil Prize, and some of its stories were translated into English. Her first novel Fármaco came out in 2021.

Sanchez first came to public notice in 2013, when she was included in Bajo 30 (Under 30), an anthology of young Spanish writers. In 2019, she was listed as one of the ten best Spanish writers in their 30s, by the 10 de 30 programme run by the AECID.
