= Lara Moreno =

Spanish writer

Lara Moreno (born 1978 in Seville) is a Spanish writer, professor, poet, and editor.

== Biography ==
Though born in Seville, Moreno grew up in Huelva. She earned a bachelor's degree in journalism from Universidad de Sevilla and a master's degree in editing from Universidad de Salamanca.

Moreno lives in Madrid where she also works as an editor and teacher of creative writing. She is the author of volumes of poetry, essays and short stories as well as two novels. She has contributed opinion pieces to El País since 2019. She also runs workshops and writing classes in Madrid.

Her short story "Toda la vida" won her the Premio Cosecha Eñe in 2013. In the same year, she won the Nuevo Talento FNAC award for her novel Por si se ve la luz. Her 2016 novel Piel de Lobo was a finalist for Premio de la Crítica. In 2017, she was selected to replace Alberto Olmos as the guest editor of the Penguin Random House imprint Caballo de Troya.

== Books ==
=== Novels ===
- Por si se va la luz (2013, Lumen)
- Piel de lobo (2016, Lumen), translated into English by Katie Whittemore as Wolfskin (2022, Structo Press)
- La ciudad (2022, Lumen), translated into English by Katie Whittemore and Alice Banks as The City (Open Letter Books, 2026)

=== Short story collections ===
- Cuatro veces fuego (2008, Tropo Editores)
- Casi todas las tijeras (2004, Editorial Quórum)

=== Essays ===
- Deshabitar (2020, Planeta de Libros)

=== Poetry ===
- Tuve una jaula (2019, La Bella Varsovia)
- Después de la apnea (2013, Ediciones del 4 de Agosto)
- La herida costumbre (2008, Puerta del Mar)
- Tempestad en víspera de viernes (2020, Lumen)
