= Remedios Zafra =

Spanish writer (born 1973)

Remedios Zafra Alcaraz (born 3 November 1973, in Zuheros) is a Spanish writer, specialising in cyberfeminism. A recipient of numerous Spanish writers awards, she is a trustee of the Spanish Academy in Rome, and has curated exhibitions at the Museo Nacional Centro de Arte Reina Sofía.
