= Juan Trejo =

Mexican water polo player (1927–2012)

Personal information
- Nationality: Mexican
- Born: May 12, 1927; Orizaba
- Died: 6 November 2012 (aged 85); Mexico City

Sport
- Sport: Water polo

Juan Trejo (12 May 1927 – 6 November 2012) was a Mexican water polo player. He competed in the men's tournament at the 1952 Summer Olympics.
