= Cristian Crusat =

Spanish-Dutch writer (born 1983)

Cristian Crusat Schretzmeijer (born 1983, Marbella) is a Spanish-Dutch writer. His father was Spanish and his mother Dutch. He studied literature at the Complutense University of Madrid and applied linguistics at the International University Menéndez Pelayo of Santander and the Cervantes Institute. He completed his doctorate in comparative literature at the University of Amsterdam.

His books include:

- Estatuas (Pre-Textos, 2006)
- Tranquilos en tiempo de guerra (Pre-Textos, 2010)
- Breve teoría del viaje y el desierto (Pre-Textos, 2011).

He has translated the writings of Marcel Schwob. He won the EU Prize for Literature for Breve teoría del viaje y el desierto.
