= Edurne Portela =

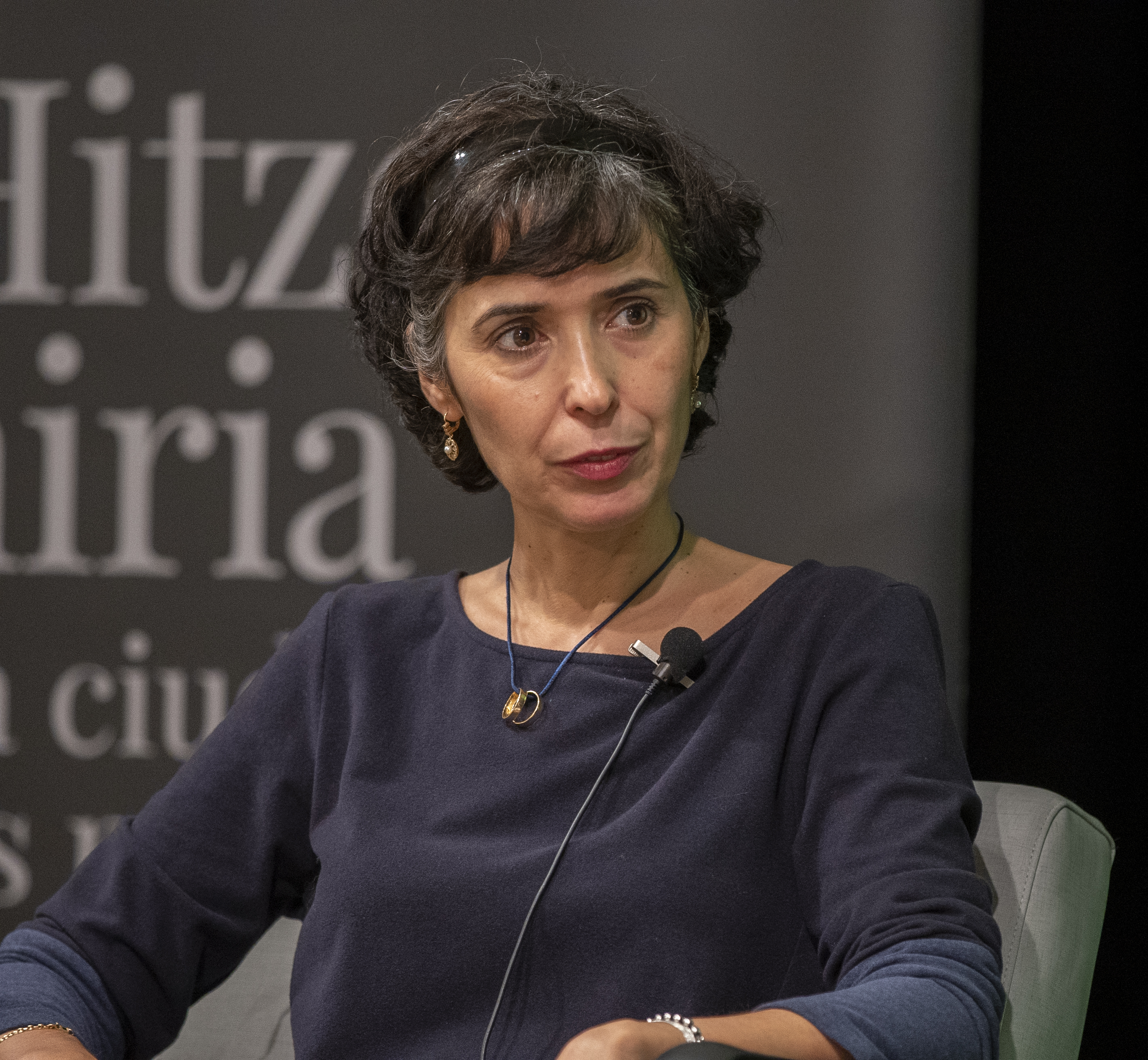
- At Literaktum 2021
- Born: Miren Edurne Portela Camino; 1974 (age 51–52); Santurtzi, Spain
- Education: University of Navarra; University of North Carolina at Chapel Hill
- Occupations: Academic, writer
- Awards: Euskadi Literature Award (2022)

Miren Edurne Portela Camino (born 1974) is a Spanish historian, philologist, university professor, essayist, and novelist.

== Biography ==
Edurne Portela was born in Santurtzi in 1974. She earned a licentiate in history from the University of Navarra in 1997. She furthered her studies in the United States, where she also developed her professional career as a teacher and researcher. She completed a master's degree in Hispanic literature in 1999, and a doctorate in Spanish and Latin American literature in 2003, both at the University of North Carolina at Chapel Hill, becoming an associate professor there from 1999 to 2001. In 2003, she moved to the College of Arts and Sciences at Lehigh University in Pennsylvania, where she taught as an associate professor from 2003 to 2008, directed the Humanities Center from 2008 to 2014, and directed the college's International Initiatives from 2013 to 2014.

In 2010, she co-founded the International Association of Spanish Literature and Cinema of the 21st Century (ALCESXXI), serving as its vice president from 2010 to 2016 and a member of the editorial board of ALCES XXI Magazine.

In 2016, Portela finished her academic career in the United States and returned to Spain in order to dedicate herself completely to writing, through the publication of essays and novels, as well as pieces for print and digital media outlets such as La Marea, El Correo, El País, RNE, and Cadena SER.

In 2018, she received the Best Fiction Book award for her novel Mejor la ausencia from the Madrid Bookstores Guild.

Her novel El eco de los disparos: cultura y memoria de la violencia received the Euskadi Literature Award for Literature in Spanish in 2022.

Both in her work as a novelist and in her essays, Edurne Portela addresses and investigates the theme of violence in different aspects, from that experienced in Basque society during the rise of ETA (as in El eco de los disparos) to the everyday violence of toxic relationships (as in Formas de estar lejos).

== Awards and recognition ==
- 2018 – Best Fiction Book, awarded by the Madrid Bookstores Guild in its 18th edition, for Mejor la ausencia
- 2022 – Euskadi Literature Award in the Literature in Spanish category, for Los ojos cerrados

== Works ==
=== Essays ===
- Displaced Memories: The Poetics of Trauma in Argentine Women Writers. Lewisburg, Pennsylvania: Bucknell University Press, 2009. ISBN 9780838757321.
- El eco de los disparos: cultura y memoria de la violencia (The Echo of the Shots: Culture and Memory of Violence). Barcelona: Galaxia Gutenberg SL, 2016. ISBN 9788416734115, 9788416734344.

=== Novels ===
- Mejor la ausencia (Better the Absence). Barcelona: Galaxia Gutenberg SL, 2017. ISBN 9788417088125, 9788417088392.
- Formas de estar lejos (Ways of Being Far Away). Barcelona: Galaxia Gutenberg SL, 2019. ISBN 9788417747107, 9788417747428.
- With Ampuero, María Fernanda; Folguera, María; Cueva, Carmen G. de la: Tranquilas: Historias para ir solas por la noche (Quiet, Stories to Go Alone at Night), 2019. ISBN 9788426407030.
- Los ojos cerrados (The Closed Eyes). Barcelona: Galaxia Gutenberg SL, 2021. ISBN 9788418526206
- Maddi y las fronteras (Maddi and the Borders). Barcelona: Galaxia Gutenberg SL, 2023. ISBN 9788419392237

=== Scientific articles ===
- "Hijos del Silencio: Intertextualidad, paratextualidad y postmemoria en La voz dormida de Dulce Chacón" in Revista de Estudios Hispánicos, 2007, vol. 41, pp. 51–71.
- "Writing (in) Prison: The Discourse of Confinement in Lidia Falcón's En el infierno" in Arizona Journal of Hispanic Cultural Studies, 2007, vol. 11, pp. 121–136.
- "Cicatrices del trauma: cuerpo, exilio y memoria en Una sola muerte numerosa de Nora Strejilevich" in Revista Iberoamericana, January–March 2008, vol. 74, n. 222, pp. 71–84.
- "'Como escritor no me interesa tomar partido': Felix Bruzzone y la memoria anti-militante" in A Contracorriente. Una Revista de Historia Social y Literatura de América Latina, Spring 2010, vol. 7, no. 3, pp. 168–184.
- "El espectro y la memoria en Cielos de barro de Dulce Chacón" in Anales de Literatura Española Contemporánea, 2011, vol. 36, no. 1, pp. 187–207.
- "Despertar del letargo: Literatura vasca contra la indiferencia y el silencio" in Revista de Estudios Hispánicos, 2013, vol. 47, no. 3, pp. 417–442.
