= Nerea Irigoyen =

Virologist

- Born: Nerea Irigoyen Vergara; 1981 (age 44–45)
- Education: University of Navarra (BSc); Autonomous University of Madrid (PhD)
- Scientific career
- Fields: Virology
- Workplaces: University of Cambridge; University of Trieste; CNB-CSIC
- Thesis: Analysis of the assembly and maturation processes of the Infectious Bursal Disease Virus capsid (2009)
- Doctoral advisor: José Francisco Rodríguez Aguirre
- Website: www.bio.cam.ac.uk/staff/nerea-irigoyen

Nerea Irigoyen Vergara (Zaragoza, Spain, 1981) is a virologist specialized in Zika virus. She leads a research group at the Department of Pathology of Cambridge University, in the UK.

== Career and research ==
Nerea Irigoyen studied Pharmacy at the University of Navarra, and carried out her PhD at CNB-CSIC in Madrid, Spain, under the supervision of José Francisco Rodríguez and José Ruiz Castón. During her predoctoral studies, she spent several months abroad in Trieste, Italy, and Cambridge, UK. After graduating, she moved to the University of Cambridge to work as a Sir Henry Wellcome postdoctoral researcher in Professor Ian Brierley's group in the Virology Division, where she also coordinated a project funded by the Medical Research Council.

In 2018, she established her own research group, to explore a new technique to explore cells infected by Zika, and other virus like coronavirus and retrovirus. With the start of the COVID-19 pandemic, her group concentrated its efforts on the investigation of SARS-CoV-2, and developed novel pharmacological strategies against this type of infections.

In 2023, Irigoyen received a Wellcome Trust Career Development Award to support her work as an independent investigator, and widen the current understanding of neuropathogenesis and neurotropism induced by the Zika virus. This £2.6 million grant will also contribute to pandemic preparedness, amid the advancement of diseases like zika, dengue, and West-Nile in non-endemic regions as a consequence of the climate crisis.

Nerea Irigoyen is also one of the founding members of the Society of Spanish Researchers in the UK (SRUK/CERU), an association that promotes communication between Spanish researchers living and working in the United Kingdom, as well as coordinates science communication and policy actions to bridge the gap with Spanish authorities and the general public.

== Academic publications (selection) ==
- Zika viruses encode 5′ upstream open reading frames affecting infection of human brain cells. Nature Communications, 2024.
- Manipulation of the unfolded protein response: A pharmacological strategy against coronavirus infection. PLoS Pathogens, 2021.
- Small-molecule inhibition of METTL3 as a strategy against myeloid leukaemia. Nature, 2021.
- Hybrid gene origination creates human-virus chimeric proteins during infection. Cell, 2020.
- An upstream protein-coding region in enteroviruses modulates virus infection in gut epithelial cells. Nature Microbiology, 2019.
