= Nuria Labari =

Spanish writer and journalist (born 1979)

- Born: January 19, 1979 (age 47); Santander, Spain
- Education: University of the Basque Country
- Occupations: Writer; journalist

Nuria Labari Gómez (born 19 January 1979) is a Spanish writer and journalist. Her first book, Los borrachos de mi vida (2009), won the seventh Caja Madrid Narrative Prize; her later books include the novels Cosas que brillan cuando están rotas (2016), La mejor madre del mundo (2019) and El último hombre blanco (2022), and the story collection No se van a ordenar solas las cosas (2024). In 2025 she published the essay La amiga que me dejó: Anatomía de una ruptura.

== Early life and education ==
Labari was born on 19 January 1979 in Santander, graduated in Political Science from the University of the Basque Country, and studied International Relations at the Instituto Ortega y Gasset.

== Journalism ==
Labari worked for El Mundo and was editor-in-chief of web content at Telecinco. Her career also included work at Marie Claire and Mediaset España, and she contributes to El País.

== Short fiction and anthologies ==
Labari's first book, the short-story collection Los borrachos de mi vida, was published by Lengua de Trapo in 2009 and won the seventh Caja Madrid Narrative Prize; she later contributed to the anthology El diablo apuesta a todo. Reviewing the collection in El País, Rosa Montero wrote that Labari had selected 13 stories for the volume and described them as an examination of fears, loneliness, routines, lies and emotional needs.

Her work was also included in Pequeñas resistencias 5, an anthology of 40 Spanish short-story writers selected and edited by Andrés Neuman. For the Instituto Cervantes's 2012 volume El sabor de la eñe, she contributed a text on stuffed peppers. In 2018 she collaborated with illustrator Quan Zhou on the children's book El gran libro de los niños extraordinarios, published by Silonia. Her story "Una de los nuestros" appeared in Hombres (y algunas mujeres), a 2019 anthology coordinated by Rosa Montero that brought together 11 Hispanic women writers.

== Novels ==
In 2016, while working as director of digital strategy at Megamedia, Labari published her first novel, Cosas que brillan cuando están rotas, which draws on her experience covering the 2004 Madrid train bombings for elmundo.es and links the attacks to a couple in crisis.

Her next novel, La mejor madre del mundo (2019), combines fiction, essay, chronicle and personal testimony to examine motherhood and its effect on creative work. The protagonist is a 35-year-old woman who is infertile when she decides to become a mother; five years and two daughters later, she feels that she has gained and lost everything. Writing in El País, Juan Cruz described the book as a mixture of genres in which Labari's own experience as a mother of two children is present alongside fiction, reportage and chronicle.

Katie Whittemore translated the novel into English as World's Best Mother. The English edition was released by World Editions on 6 April 2021; Kirkus Reviews praised Labari's candor and the passages about the narrator's mother and grandmother, but found much of its treatment of motherhood familiar.

Labari's 2022 novel El último hombre blanco follows a senior executive who has reshaped her body, language and sexual relationships to succeed in male-dominated business culture. She described the book as an "autopsy of work" and its protagonist as an infiltrator from a working-class family.

== Later work ==
Labari returned to short fiction in 2024 with No se van a ordenar solas las cosas, fifteen years after Los borrachos de mi vida. The book was a finalist for the eighth Ribera del Duero Short Fiction Prize. Reviewing the collection in El País, Andrea Toribio concentrated on its privileged characters and their inability to recognise the harm they cause.

In 2025 she published La amiga que me dejó: Anatomía de una ruptura, an essay prompted by the end of a close friendship and by the lack of language available to describe that loss.
