= Alejandro Morellón =

Spanish writer

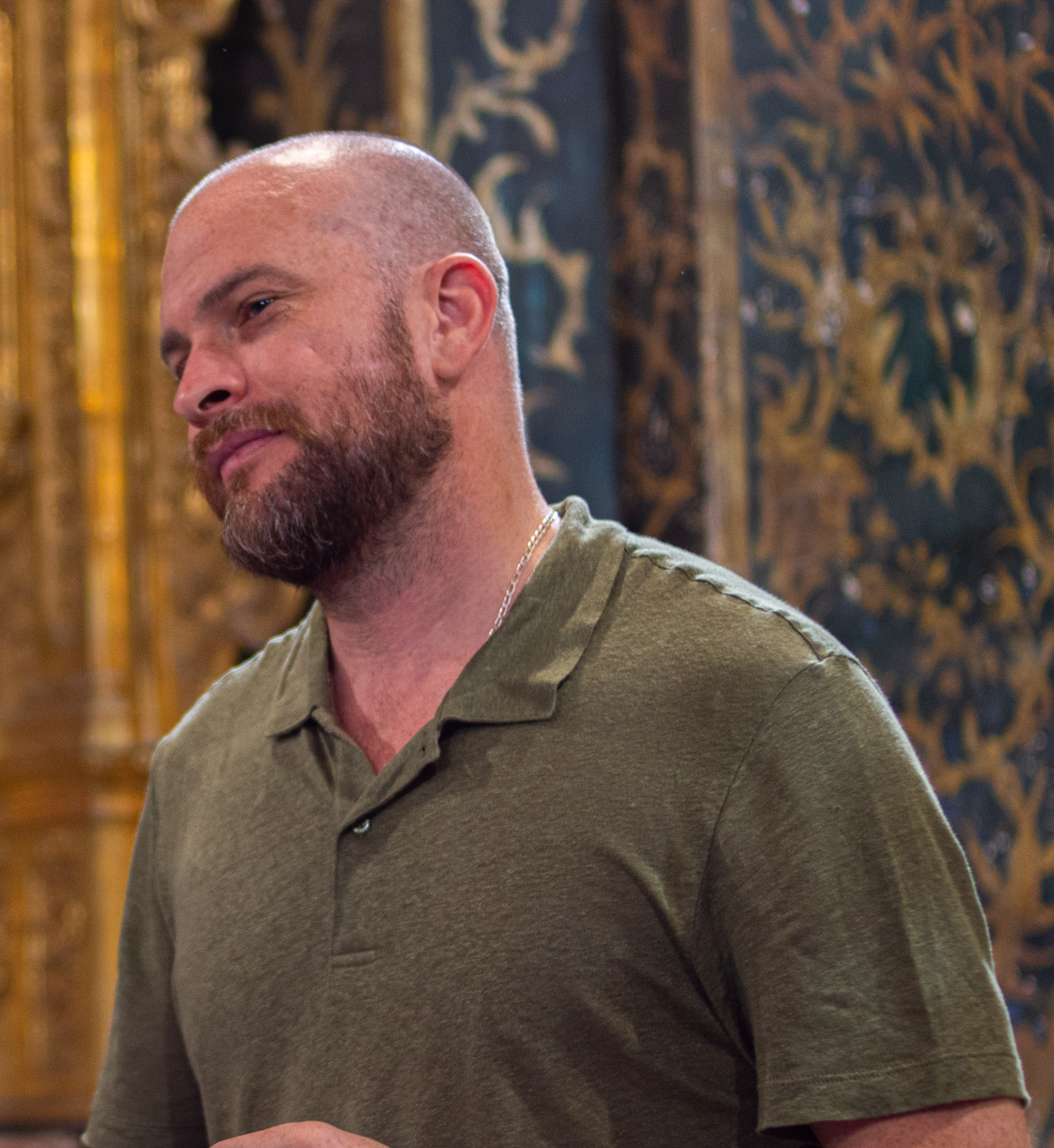
Alejandro Morellón

Alejandro Morellón (born 1985) is a Spanish writer. He was born in Madrid, and raised in Palma de Mallorca.

His books include:

- La noche en que caemos (winner of the 2013 MonteLeón Foundation Award)
- El estado natural de las cosas (winner of the 2017 Gabriel García Márquez Hispano-American Short Story Prize)
- Caballo sea la noche

In 2021, Morellon was named by Granta magazine as one of the best young writers in the Spanish language.

He lives in Madrid.
