= Natàlia Cerezo =

Catalan writer

Natàlia Cerezo (born 1985, Castellar del Vallés) is a Catalan writer. She graduated with a degree in translation and interpretation from the Autonomous University of Barcelona, working as a translator. Her debut work was a collection of 15 short stories in Catalan titled A les ciutats amagades (2018), published in Spanish under the title En las ciudades escondidas. In 2018, she won the El Ojo Crítico Award from RNE for narrative excellence.

== Works ==
=== Short stories ===
- A les ciutats amagades (Rata Books, 2018)
- Ara soc un llac (Empúries, 2024)
- Tˈestimo com la sal. Les filles parlen del pare. 19 relats i un conte, anthology of short stories by various authors (Vienna Edicions, 2024)

=== Novel ===
- I van passar tants anys (Rata Books, 2021)
