= Irene Vallejo =

Spanish writer and academic (born 1979)

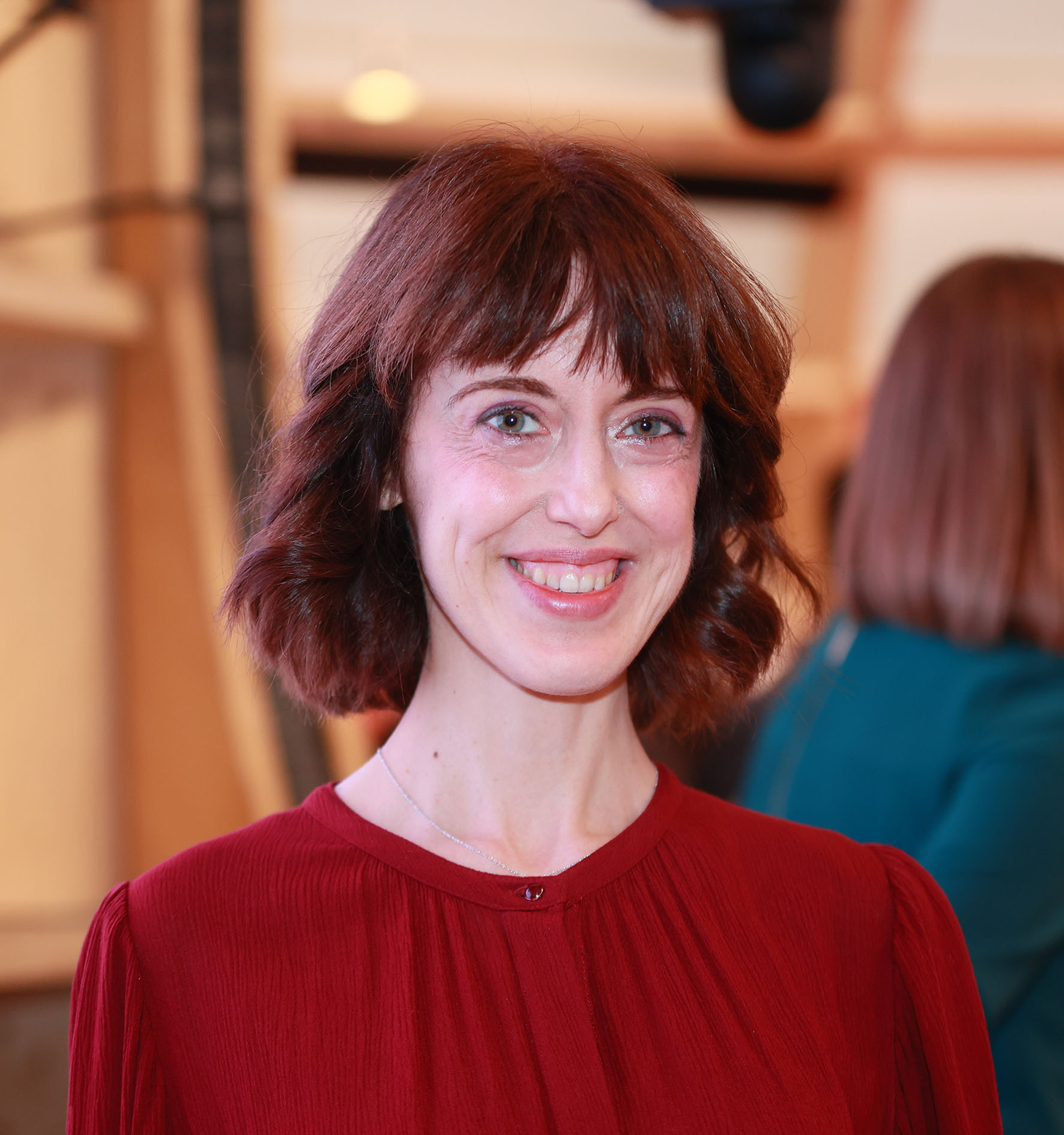
- Vallejo in 2022
- Born: 1979 (age 46–47); Zaragoza, Aragón, Spain
- Education: University of Zaragoza (Phd); University of Florence (Phd)
- Occupations: Writer; Philologist; Essayist; Historian
- Writing career
- Period: 2008–present
- Notable work: El Infinito en un Junco (Papyrus) (2019)
- Notable awards: Premio Nacional de Ensayo (2020); Premio Aragón (2021)

Irene Vallejo Moreu, born in Zaragoza in 1979, is a Spanish philologist, historian, and writer.

== Career ==
Vallejo is a doctor of classical philology from the universities of Zaragoza and Florence, and much of her work focuses on the investigation and exploration of classical authors, particularly their connection and intersection with the present day. Her first published book was a scholarly investigation into literary terminology in the Roman poet Martial. Other work has consisted of articles published in the Spanish newspapers Heraldo de Aragón and El País, in which she mixes discussion of ancient writers and current events. Some of these articles were eventually collected into two books, published under the titles El pasado que te espera and Alguien habló de nosotros.

In 2020 she was awarded the Premio Nacional de Literatura en la modalidad de Ensayo (the National Prize of Literature in the Manner of the Essay) for her book El Infinito en un Junco – Infinity in a Reed (Published in English in 2022 as Papyrus), the fifth woman to win the prize since its creation in 1975. She was the first woman to win the prize since the philosopher Celia Amorós in 2006. She later went on to receive in 2021 the Premio Aragón, the highest distinction awarded by the government of Aragon for the same book. The book was translated into English by Charlotte Whittle, and published in 2022 by Hodder & Stoughton, to favourable reviews by the English-speaking press, with praise from The Guardian and featured on The Economist's best books of 2022. The book chronicles the history of books and reading in the ancient world, detailing both how these activities shaped the ancient world then and how these effects reverberate to this day.

She also writes both fiction and children's literature. In 2011, she published her first novel, La Luz Sepultada, set in Zaragoza in 1936 amid the buildup to the Spanish Civil War. Her second novel, El Silbido del Arquero, was published in 2015 by Contraseña. She has as well written two children's books, El Inventor de Viajes, illustrated by José Luis Cano, and La Leyenda de las Mareas Mansas, in collaboration with the painter Lina Vila.

== Works ==
- Terminología Libraria y Crítico-literaria en Marcial (2008)
- El Pasado que te Espera (2010)
- La Luz Sepultada (2011)
- El Inventor de Viajes (2014)
- La Leyenda de las Mareas Mansas (2015)
- El Silbido del Arquero (2015)
- Alguien Habló de Nosotros (2017)
- El Infinito en un Junco (2019)
- Manifiesto por la Lectura (2020)
