= Elisa Ferrer =

Spanish writer

- Born: 1983 (age 42–43); Valencia
- Education: Audiovisual Communication at the University of Valencia, scriptwriting at the Madrid Film School, and creative writing at University of Iowa.
- Occupation: Writer
- Notable work: Temporada de avispas.
- Awards: Tusquets Prize for novels in 2019

Elisa Ferrer Elisa Ferrer

Elisa Ferrer is a Spanish writer. She was born in L'Alcúdia de Crespins, Valencia in 1983. Ferrer studied Audiovisual Communication at the University of Valencia, scriptwriting at the Madrid Film School, and creative writing at University of Iowa. She won the Tusquets Prize for novels in 2019 with her work Temporada de avispas. She was also named as one of the best young writers in Spain by the 10 de 30 project.

== Works ==
=== Novels ===
- Temporada de avispas (2019)
- El holandés (2023)
