= Yolanda Domínguez =

Spanish artist

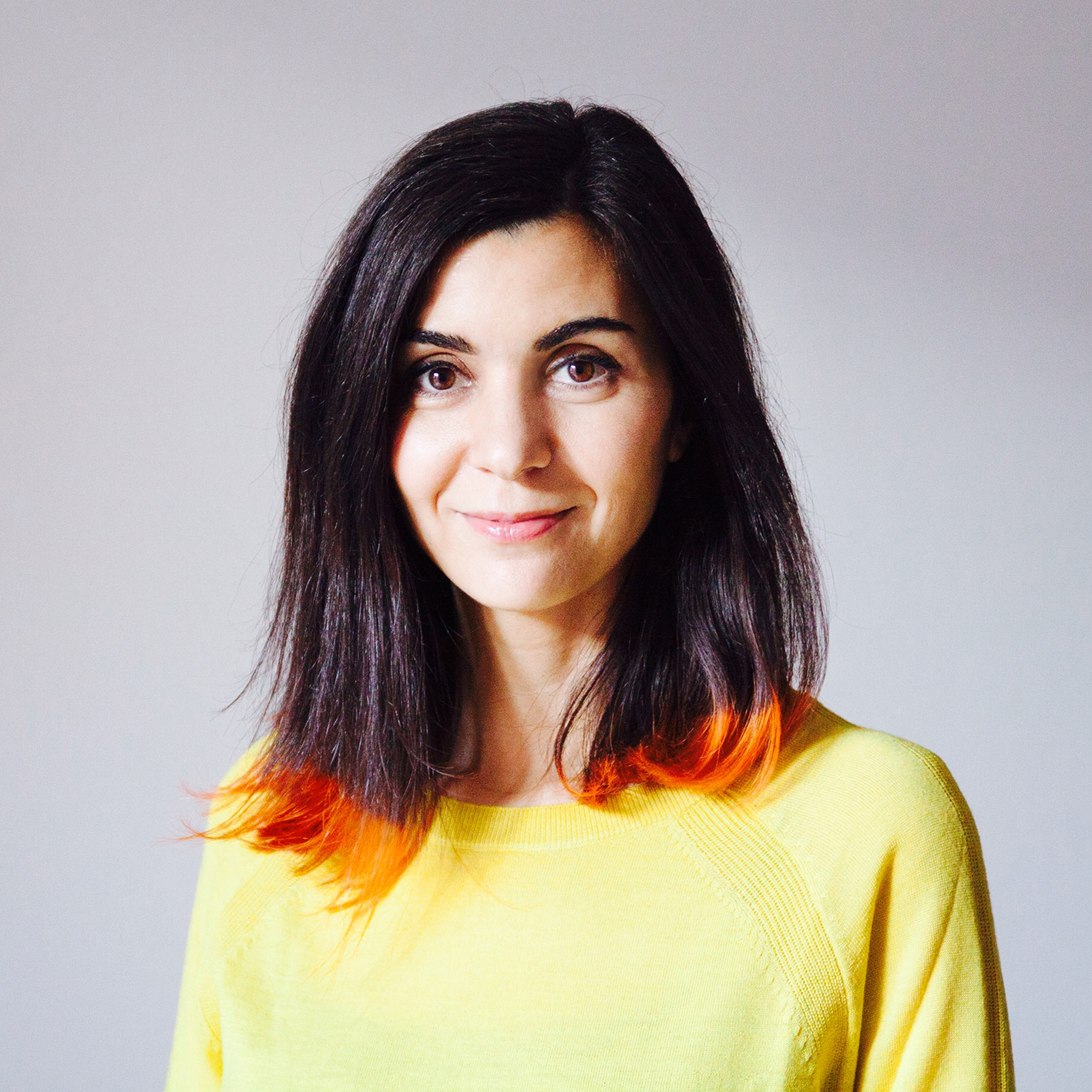
- Education: Complutense University of Madrid; European University of Madrid
- Occupations: Artist; Media critic; Gender equality activist

Yolanda Domínguez Rodríguez is a Spanish visual artist, activist, and journalist.

== Life and career ==
Domínguez studied Fine Arts at the Complutense University of Madrid. She has a master's degree in Art and New Technologies from the European University of Madrid, and another master's degree in Contemporary Photography from the EFTI School of Photography in Madrid.

Domínguez's works are part of the arte de acción (action art) movement (es), focusing on critical art that provokes awareness related to issues of gender equality and materialistic consumption.

She specializes in performance art or large visual displays that use irony and decontextualization to create situations in which the viewer becomes involved and has the opportunity to participate. In 2008, she filled the streets of Madrid with posters that portrayed women being offered economic benefits to behave as traditional wives. Her subsequent large performances or installations have included Katy Salinas and Pido para un Chanel (2010), Poses (2011), Fashion Victims (2013), I'm not just a body and Registro (2014), Accesibles y Accesorias and Niños vs. Moda (2015), Total Correction and No tocar, no matar, no violar, este cuerpo es mío y de nadie más (2016). Her work has been exhibited in venues including the Elga Wimmer Gallery in New York, the Open Systems in Vienna and the Rojo Artspace in Milan.

Domínguez has worked as a digital and gender analyst at HuffPost. She is also a professor at the EFTI School of Photography.
