= Margarita Leoz =

Spanish writer

Margarita Leoz Munilla (born 1980) is a Spanish critic and writer. She was born in Pamplona and studied language and literature at the University of Salamanca and the University of Barcelona. Her books include: El telar de Penélope (poetry, 2008) and Segunda residencia (short stories, 2012). She was named as one of the best young writers in Spain by the 10 de 30 project.
