= Andrei Dósa =

Romanian poet, novelist and translator

Andrei Dósa (born 1985) is a Romanian poet, novelist and translator. He was born in Brașov, Romania. His literary debut, the poetry collection Cînd va veni ceea ce este desăvîrșit (2011), received the Mihai Eminescu Opera Prima National Poetry Award and the Iustin Panța Debut Prize.

His work has received critical coverage in Romanian literary publications including Observator Cultural and Dilema Veche.

== Literary career ==
Dósa published his first poetry collection, Cînd va veni ceea ce este desăvîrșit, with Tracus Arte in 2011. The collection received the Mihai Eminescu Opera Prima National Poetry Award and the Iustin Panța Debut Prize.

His second collection, American Experience, was published by Cartea Românească in 2013. Literary critic Marius Chivu reviewed the book in Dilema Veche, describing it as a continuation of Dósa's exploration of formative experiences, this time through temporary work and travel in the United States. Chivu discussed alienation and cultural displacement as central elements of the collection.

American Experience received the Young Poet of the Year award at the Young Writers' Gala.

Dósa subsequently published Nada (2015) and adevăratul băiat de aur (2017). Reviewing the latter in Observator Cultural, literary critic Adina Dinițoiu described Dósa as an established voice among the younger generation of Romanian poets and discussed the relationship of his poetry to contemporary technology, digital communication, music and social experience.

His later poetry collections are Expectativa luminoasă (2020) and Ultima familie tradițională (2024). The latter was nominated for the poetry prize at the 2025 Radio România Cultural Awards. Radio România Cultural described the collection as centred on fatherhood and contemporary family life.

Dósa has also published prose. His novels include Ierbar (2018) and Multă forță și un dram de gingășie (2021), followed by Ceaikovski la walkman (2022).

== Translation ==
Dósa translates Hungarian literature into Romanian. His translations include works by poets György Petri, István Kemény and Szilárd Borbély, as well as novels by Dezső Kosztolányi and Magda Szabó.

== Works ==
=== Poetry ===
- Cînd va veni ceea ce este desăvîrșit (Tracus Arte, 2011)
- American Experience (Cartea Românească, 2013)
- Nada (Pandora M, 2015)
- adevăratul băiat de aur (Casa de Editură Max Blecher, 2017)
- Expectativa luminoasă (OMG Publishing, 2020)
- Ultima familie tradițională (OMG Publishing, 2024)

=== Prose ===
- Ierbar (Polirom, 2018)
- Multă forță și un dram de gingășie (Polirom, 2021)
- Ceaikovski la walkman (Paralela 45, 2022)

== Awards and nominations ==
- Mihai Eminescu Opera Prima National Poetry Award, for Cînd va veni ceea ce este desăvîrșit
- Iustin Panța Debut Prize, for Cînd va veni ceea ce este desăvîrșit
- Young Poet of the Year, for American Experience
- Nomination, Radio România Cultural Award for Poetry, for Ultima familie tradițională (2025)
