= Anna Freixas =

Spanish feminist writer and professor

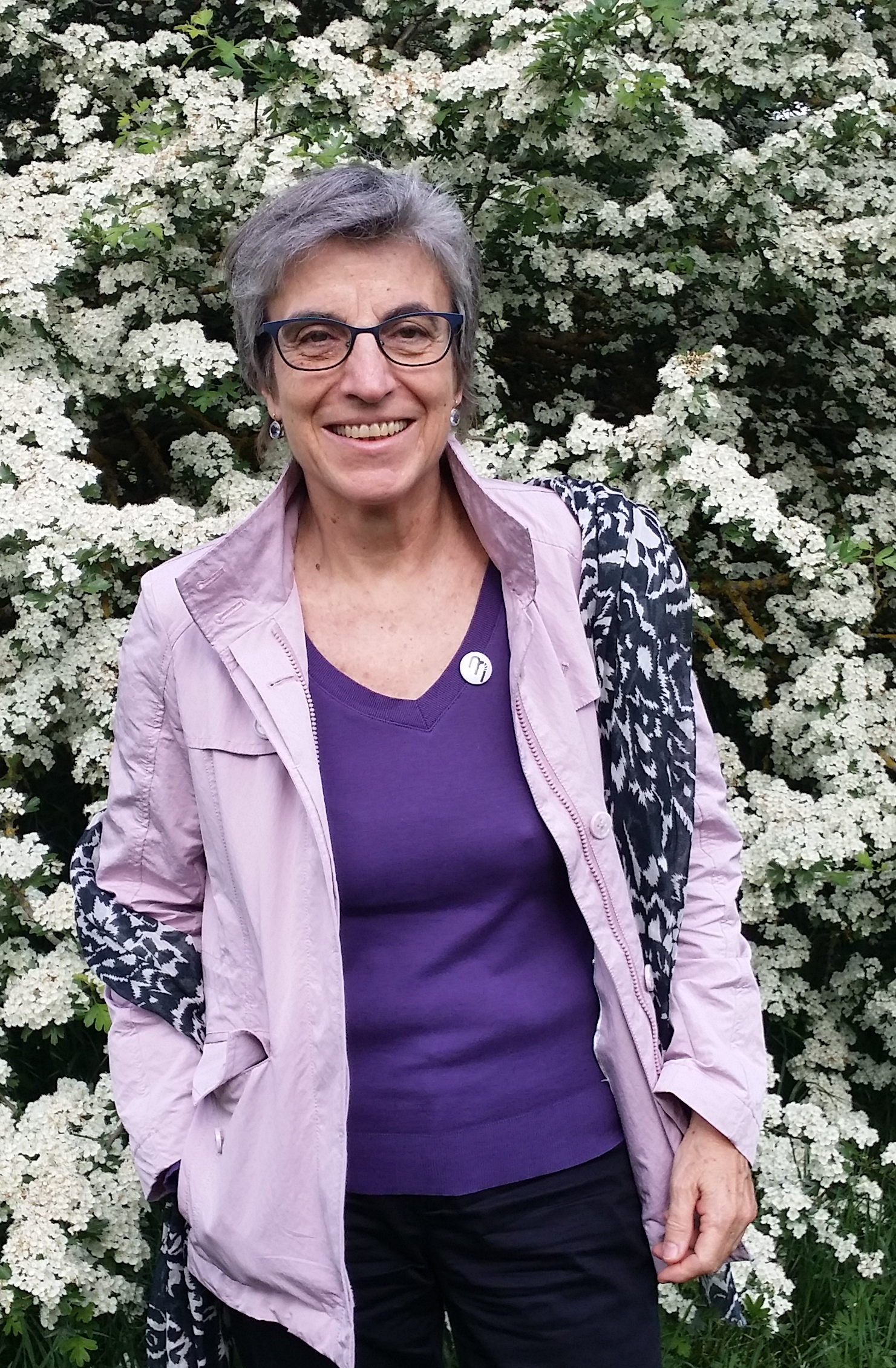
- Born: Anna Freixas Farré; 21 July 1946 (age 80); Barcelona, Spain
- Education: University of Barcelona
- Occupations: Writer, professor
- Employer: University of Córdoba
- Awards: Meridiana Award (2009)

Anna Freixas Farré (born 21 July 1946) is a Spanish feminist writer and retired university professor.

== Biography ==
Anna Freixas graduated with a PhD in psychology at the University of Barcelona, where she was a pupil of Miquel Siguán, and where she developed the first years of her teaching career. In her doctoral thesis, she analyzed the self-perception of the aging process of women. In 1981 she arrived in Andalusia, when she entered the University of Córdoba, first at the Institute of Education Sciences and then the Faculty of Educational Sciences, where she was Professor of Evolutionary Psychology and Education. She also created and directed (from 1994 to 2001) the Women's Studies Classroom, later transformed into the Leonor de Guzmán Chair.

Her lines of research have concerned the aging of women, coeducation and feminism, and the evolution of research and teaching in psychology from a gender perspective. She is considered to have had pioneering contributions to the development of feminist gerontology in Spain.

== Works ==
- Mujer y envejecimiento. Aspectos psicosociales (La Caixa Foundation, 1993)
- (Ed.) Abuelas, madres, hijas: La transmisión sociocultural del arte de envejecer (ISBN 8474267927, Icaria Editorial, 2005)
- Demà més: dones, vides i temps (Institut Català de les Dones, 2006)
- Nuestra menopausia: una versión no oficial (ISBN 9788449319877, Paidós, 2007)
- Tan frescas. Las nuevas mujeres mayores del siglo XXI (ISBN 9788449328664, Paidós, 2013)
- Sin reglas. Erótica y libertad femenina en la madurez (ISBN 9788494740893, Capitán Swing, 2018)
- Yo, vieja. Apuntes de supervivencia para seres libres (Capitán Swing, 2021).

== Awards and recognitions ==
- Freixas's work Mujer y envejecimiento. Aspectos psicosociales won the Dr. Rogeli Duocastella Award for Research in the Field of Social Sciences, given by the La Caixa Foundation, in 1993.
- In 1999 she received the 6th Carmen de Burgos Feminist Disclosure Award, granted by the University of Málaga's Association of Historical and Women's Studies.
- In 2009 she received, ex aequo, the Meridiana Award from the Regional Government of Andalusia, granted in recognition of work done by people and institutions in favor of equal rights between men and women, in the category of Artistic Production, Cultural, or Sports Initiatives.
- In 2019 she was named Doctor Honoris Causa by the Simón Bolívar University of Barranquilla (Colombia). First woman to have this recognition.
- In 2021 she received the Friends of the Elders 2021 Award.
