= Munir Hachemi =

Spanish author

Munir Hachemi (born 1989) is a Spanish writer.

In 2021, he was named by Granta magazine as one of the most promising young Spanish-language writers in the world.

== Life ==
He was born in Madrid to an Algerian father and studied Spanish at university. He also obtained a master's degree in Latin American studies. His fiction appeared initially in fanzines under the aegis of the Escritores Bárbaros collective. His first novel Cosas vivas appeared in 2018.

He was writer in residence at the Cheuse Center.

== Works ==
- Cosas vivas (2018)
  - Hachemi, Munir; Sanches, Julia (2024). Living Things. London: Fitzcarraldo Editions. ISBN 978-1-80427-088-2.
- El árbol viene [The Coming of the Tree] (2023)
- Lo que falta (2025)
