= Matías Candeira =

Spanish writer

Matías Candeira (born 1984) is a Spanish writer. He was born in Madrid. He works as a freelance journalist and also teaches creative writing.

Candeira is the author of the novel Fiebre (Candaya, 2015) and several collections of stories. Among these, the most notable are:

- Antes de las jirafas (Páginas de Espuma, 2011)
- Ya no estaremos aquí (Salto de Página, 2017)
- Moebius (Algaida, 2019)

Moebius won the received the Kutxa Ciudad de San Sebastián award in 2018. In 2021, the Spanish Agency for International Cooperation named Candeira as one of the "10 de 30", a project that identifies the most outstanding Spanish authors under the age of forty.
