= Jordi Nopca =

Spanish journalist, writer and translator

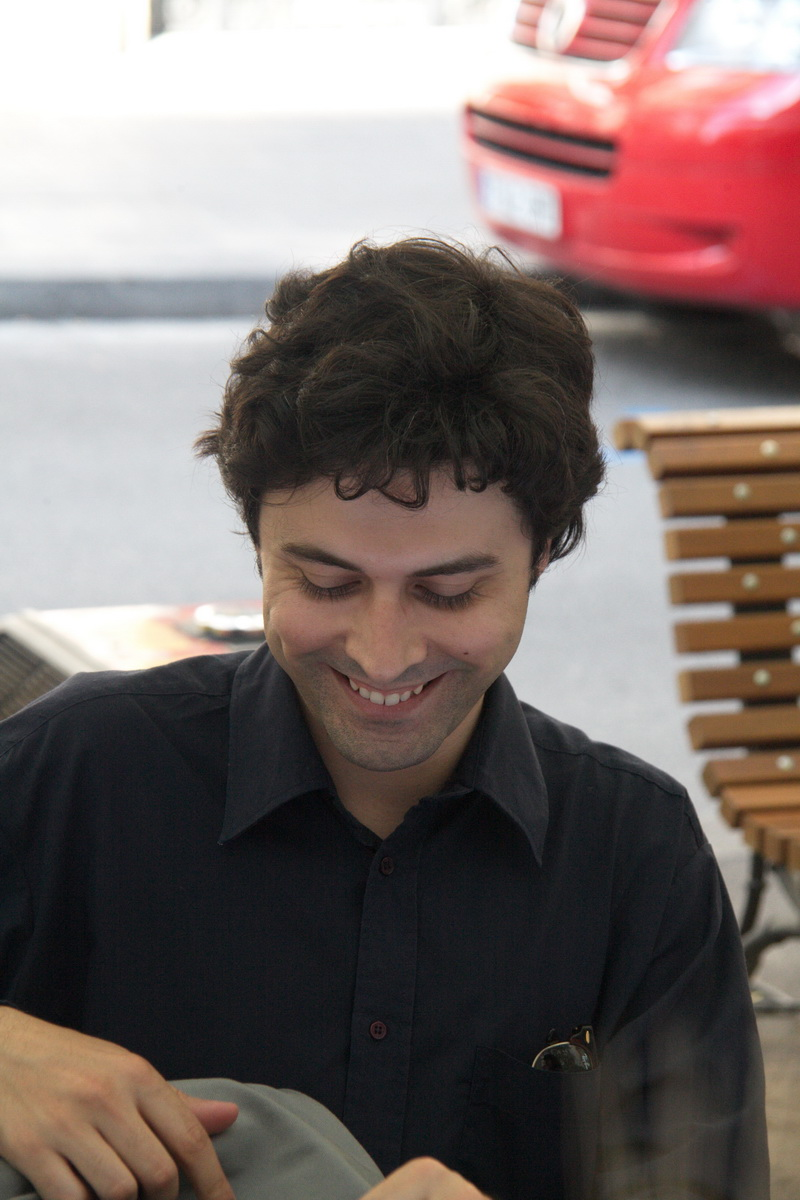
- Jordi Nopca at the Book signing on St. George's Day-2015 in Barcelona
- Born: 1983 (age 42–43); Barcelona, Catalonia, Spain
- Education: Journalism, literary theory, and comparative literature
- Writing career
- Language: Catalan
- Genre: Novel
- Notable works: Puja a casa, La teva ombra
- Notable awards: II Memorial Pere Rodeja
- Website: jordinopca.blogspot.com

Jordi Nopca (born 1983, in Barcelona) is a Spanish journalist, writer and translator. He is a current editor of Ara newspaper and the editor-in-chief of Ara Llegim.

== Biography ==
Jordi Nopca studied Journalism and Literary theory and Comparative literature. Since 2006 he has published more than two thousand articles mainly for Ara newspaper, but also magazines such as Mondosonoro, Benzina, Sortim, Què fem?, Go Mag and Time Out Barcelona.

In 2012 he published his first novel, entitled El talent, with the publishing house Labreu Edicions. It narrates the experiences of a young couple who travels to Lisbon with a stolen prototype that can detect litarari talent. Thanks to this invention they are able to discover the hidden talent of several people, publish their work and earn a living. According to the author, the novel "should be placed before the crisis, that has led to a gradual dismantling of illusions, so this novel is pre-illusions lost".

The literary critic Julià Guillamon states in La Vanguardia that "his first novel is a wise foolish, full of references to ancient and modern authors, classics and fashion books, which are mixed in an rough history". According to Guillamon, "the flair of the novel is that it makes you slide very quickly, by dint of wit, hilarious dialogues and impossible narrative situations".

In 2013 he received the II Memorial Pere Rodeja, awarded by Catalan Association of Booksellers, for "offering to the readers a broad view, innovative and complete of the literary reality of our country".

== Published work ==
- El futur és una petita flama, novel (Proa, 2025)
- La teva ombra, novel (Proa, 2019) / En la sombra (Destino, 2020)
- Puja a casa, short-story collection (L'Altra, 2015) / Vente a casa (Libros del Asteroide, 2015) / Come on up (Bellevue Literary Press, 2021)
- El talent, novel (Labreu Edicions, 2012)

== Translations ==
- William Keepers Maxwell, Jr., They Came Like Swallows as Van venir com orenetes (Libros del Asteroide, 2007)
- Jetta Carleton, The Moonflower Vine as Quatre germanes (Libros del Asteroide, 2009)
- David Monteagudo, Fin as Fi (Quaderns Crema, 2010)
- David Monteagudo, Marcos Montes (Quaderns Crema, 2010)
- Szilárd Borbély, foreword in the novel The dispossessed (Els desposseïts, Edicions del Periscopi, 2015)
- Les Murray, Killing the black dog as Matar el gos negre (Días Contados, 2017)
- Fyodor M. Dostoevsky, foreword in Notes from Underground (Apunts del subsòl, Angle Editorial, 2021)
- Gunnhild Oyehaug, foreword in Knots (Nusos, Nits Blanques/Las afueras, 2021)
- Cynthia Ozick, foreword in Antiquities (Antiguitats, Labreu edicions, 2022)
- Tsitsi Dangarembga, foreword in The Book of Not (El llibre del no, L'Agulla Daurada, 2024)
- Hans Christian Andersen, foreword in Collected stories (Tots els contes, Adesiara, 2025)
- Sayaka Murata, foreword in Life ceremony (La cerimònia, Empúries, 2025)
- Ryu Murakami, foreword in Piercing (Pírcing, Gata Maula, 2026)
- James Baldwin, foreword in Going to Meet the Man (Hora de conèixer l'home, Trotalibros, 2026)
- Saphia Azzeddine, foreword in Mon père est femme de menage (Mon pare és dona de fer feines, Capdebrot, 2026)
