= Laura Freixas =

Spanish novelist, short story writer and newspaper columnist

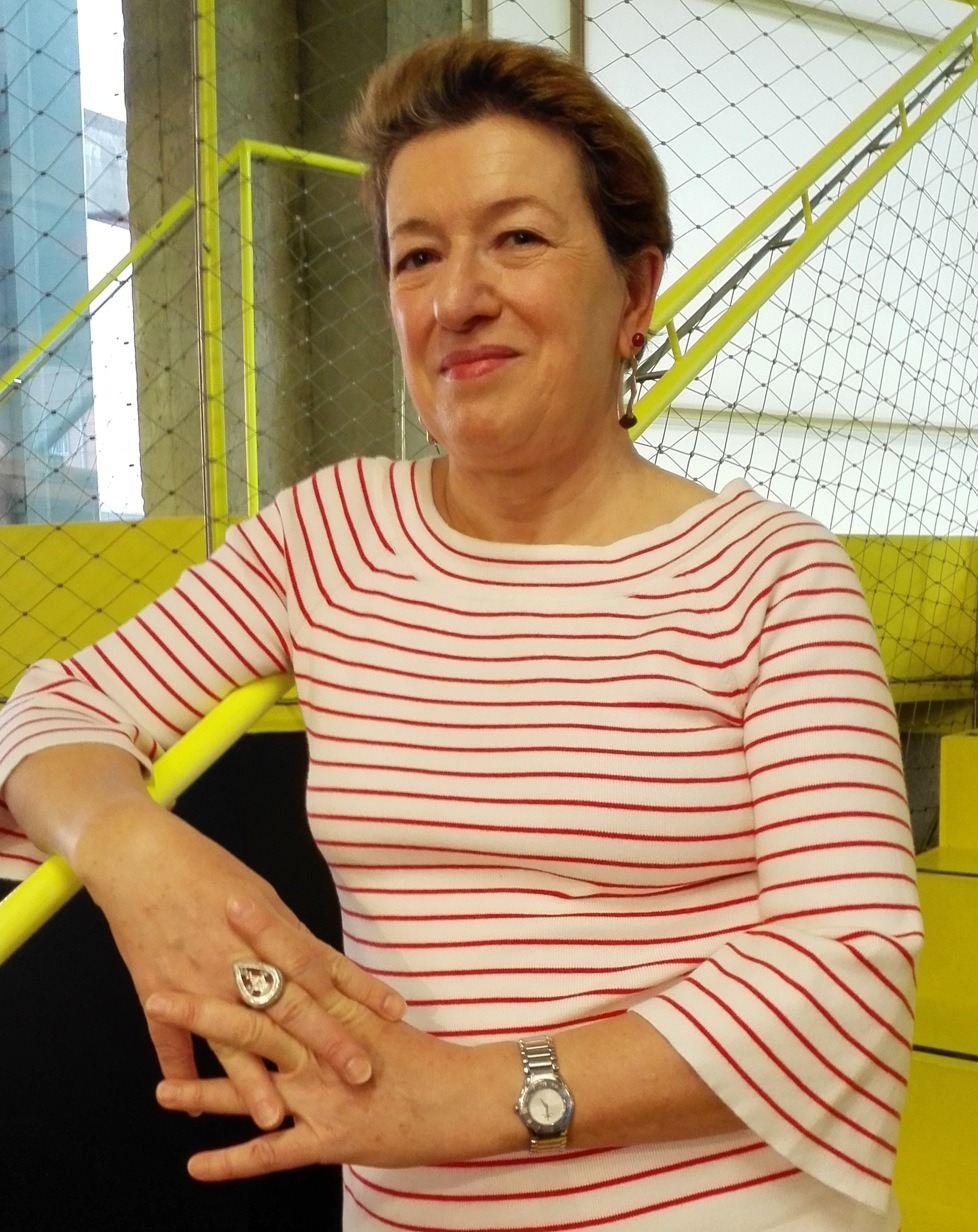
- Laura Freixas en Medialab Prado in Madrid, october 2017
- Born: Laura Freixas Revuelta; 1958 (age 67–68); Barcelona, Spain
- Occupations: Writer, novelist, essayist, literary critic, translator, journalist, art critic
- Website: www.laurafreixas.com

Laura Freixas (born 1958) is a Spanish novelist, short story writer, and newspaper columnist.

== Biography ==
Freixas was born in Barcelona in 1958. Laura Freixas is the granddaughter of Freixas Miquel. Freixas studied at the French School in her home city of Barcelona. She got a BA degree in Law in 1980 from the University of Barcelona. She has been active as a writer since 1988. Freixas' work also includes scholarship and promotion of women writers.

She has also worked in international universities as a publisher, a Spanish language assistant, and a translator. At present she teaches literature workshops for different institutions. She writes as a columnist for the newspaper La Vanguardia and does literary reviews for its supplement Cultura/s. She is a contributor to literary magazines such as Mercurio, Letras libres, El País, and Revista de Libros.

She has been a lecturer or a writer in residence at many Spanish and foreign universities and taught creative writing at the University of Virginia (UVA). She is a member of the European Cultural Parliament and the chair of the association Clásicas y Modernas for gender equality in Spanish culture from 2009 to 2017.

Freixas has campaigned against trans-inclusive laws in Spain as she views it as a regression for Spanish gender equality.

== Literary work ==
=== Novels ===
- Último domingo en Londres (1997)
- Entre amigas (1998)
- Amor o lo que sea (2005), translated into English as Love A Reader.
- Los otros son más felices (2011)
- A mí no me iba a pasar (2019)

=== Short story collections ===
- The Wrist Murderer (1988)
- Tales at the Age of Forty (2001)

=== Compilations ===
- Mothers and Daughters (1996) – Freixas also wrote the prologue
- Women Friends (2009)

=== Non-fiction works ===
- Literatura y mujeres (2000)
- La novela femenil y sus lectrices (2009)

=== Autobiography ===
- A Teenager in Barcelona Around 1970 (2007)
