= Aixa de la Cruz =

Spanish writer

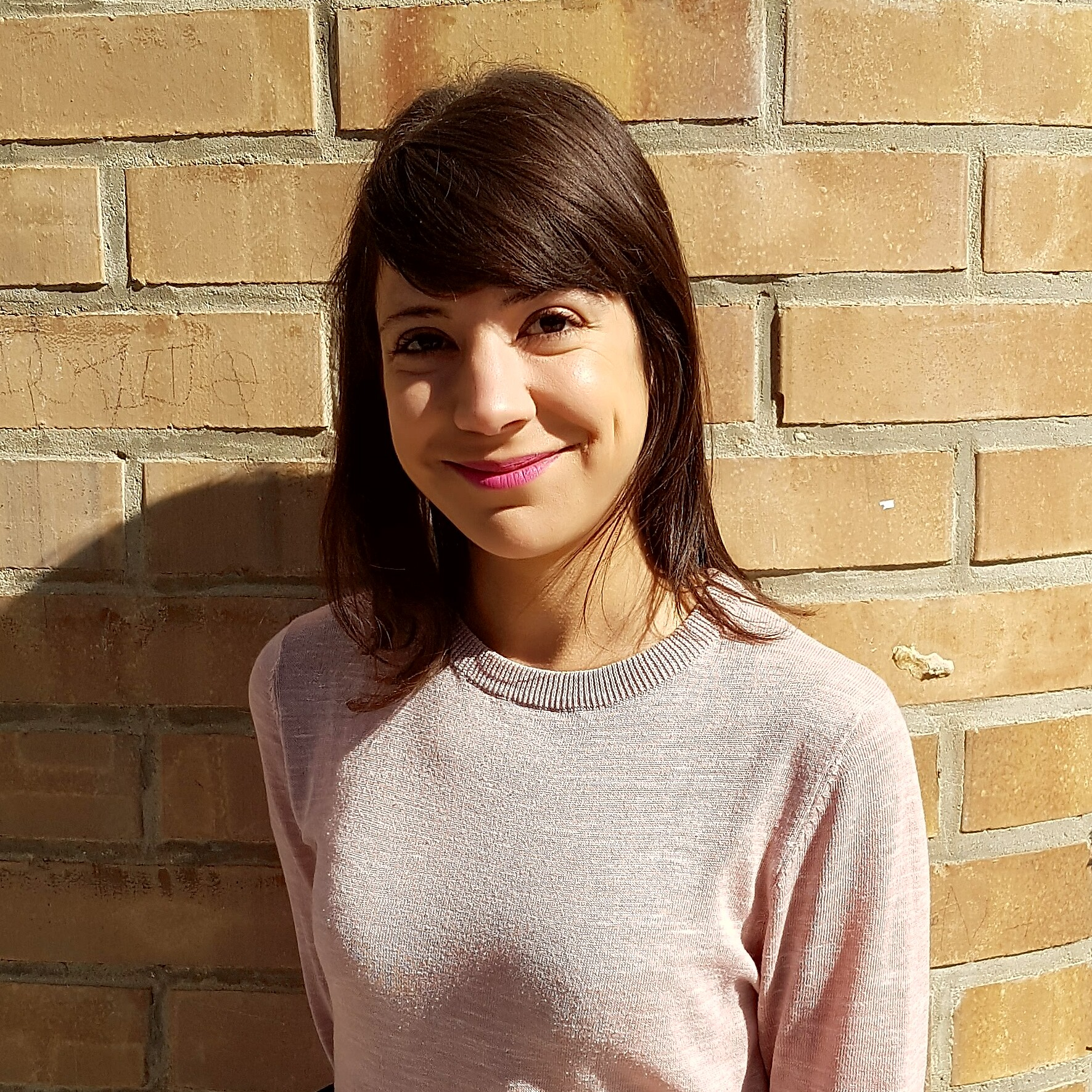
- Born: Aixa de la Cruz Regúlez; 7 April 1988 (age 38) Bilbao

Aixa de la Cruz Regúlez (Bilbao, 7 April 1988) is a Spanish writer. She is the author of the novels Cuando fuimos los mejores and De música ligera, both of which were shortlisted for the Premio Euskadi de Literatura. Cruz has also published a book of short stories titled Modelos Animales (Animal Models, 2015) and contributed to various fiction anthologies, including Última temporada (Lengua de Trapo, 2013), Bajo treinta (Salto de página, 2013) and Best European Fiction 2015 (Dalkey Archive, 2014), which reprinted her story "True Milk."

== Life and writing ==
While still in school Cruz began writing articles and short stories, resulting in her being given a grant in 2006 from the Antonio Gala Foundation. She currently lives in Spain and is a teacher at the Writers' School in Madrid.

Cruz's play I Don't Like Mondays was a finalist of the Margarita Xirgú and Madrid Sur contests and released in Mexico in 2012. The 2017 play "Animal Models," about an actress who reinterprets herself, is based on her short story of the same title. The story follows the daily lives of a young playwright in Canada who's pampered by the main actress the playwright writes for.

Cruz's writing has been described as walking the border between reason and sanity, the familiar and the strange.

Her last novel is "La línea del frente" (2017).

== Awards and honors ==
Cruz's first two novels Cuando fuimos los mejores (Almuzara, 2007) and De música ligera (451 Editores, 2009). were shortlisted for the Premio Euskadi de Literatura.

In 2013 she was selected by the Spanish magazine El Cultural as one of twelve writers under 40 worth watching. In 2014 Cruz won the Cosecha Eñe, the annual prize for short stories from Eñe Magazine.
