= Nerea Barjola =

Spanish feminist writer

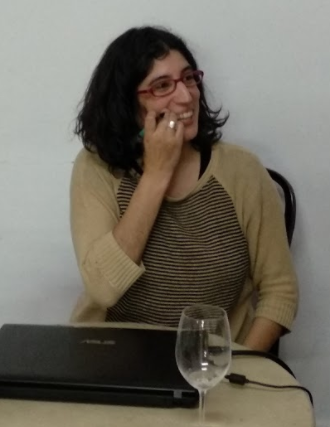
- Occupations: Historian; Feminist scholar; Political scientist

Nerea Barjola Ramos is a Spanish social scientist and feminist activist. She is known for analysing the media coverage of the Alcàsser Case as a reaction to feminist activity in Spain in early 1990s, arguing that it responded to recent gains of the feminist movement by portraying them as inherently connected to violence against women.

== Life and career ==
Barjola studied Political Science and Administrative Studies at the University of the Basque Country. She then pursued equity studies at the National University of Distance Education. She obtained a doctorate in Feminist and Gender Studies at the University of the Basque Country in 2014, with a thesis entitled Las representaciones del peligro sexual y su influencia en las prácticas de las mujeres a partir del crimen sexual de Alcásser (1992) (The representations of sexual danger and its influence on the practices of women from the sexual crime of Alcásser, 1992).

Barjola's doctoral thesis re-examined the Alcàsser Case, which was the sensational murder of three young women in 1992 that made a substantial impact on Spanish popular culture, from the perspective of Spanish feminist activity in the 1990s. Specifically, she argued that the sensationalism of the murders, and the way that they were portrayed in mass media, served as a reaction against the burgeoning feminist movement of 1990s Spain, providing a rationale for pushback against the increasing prominence of women in Spanish public life. In 2018, she continued this line of research in her book Microfísica sexista del poder. El caso Alcàsser y la construcción del terror sexual (Sexist microphysics of power: The Alcàsser case and the construction of sexual terror). In Microfísica sexista del poder, Barjola casts prominent coverage of the Alcàsser Case as an example of victim blaming, in which the fact that the three victims were out late partying was treated as an explanation for their murder, and the lucky decision of a fourth woman to stay home was used as a moral tale to discourage women's freedom. She argues that the sensational coverage of the murders affected the attitudes and behaviours of a generation of Spanish women, by portraying sexual terror as a logical consequence of the advances of the Spanish feminist movement in areas like freedom of movement and bodily autonomy.

More broadly, Barjola has argued that a certain amount of sexual violence is explicitly permitted in the political system, because it serves a purpose for scaring away challenges to the structure of society.
