= Arvis Viguls =

Latvian poet and translator (born 1987)

Arvis Viguls (born 1987) is a Latvian poet and translator.

His debut poetry collection Istaba (A Room) appeared in 2009, and won the Latvian Writers’ Union Prize for Best Debut Collection. His next book 5:00 (2012) was also lauded and won awards. His poetry has been translated into English, German and Russian.

As a translator, Viguls has translated works by Joseph Brodsky, Federico García Lorca, Walt Whitman and W. B. Yeats.

In 2017, he was selected as one of Literary Europe Live's New Voices from Europe. He lives in Riga.
