= Sabina Urraca =

Spanish writer

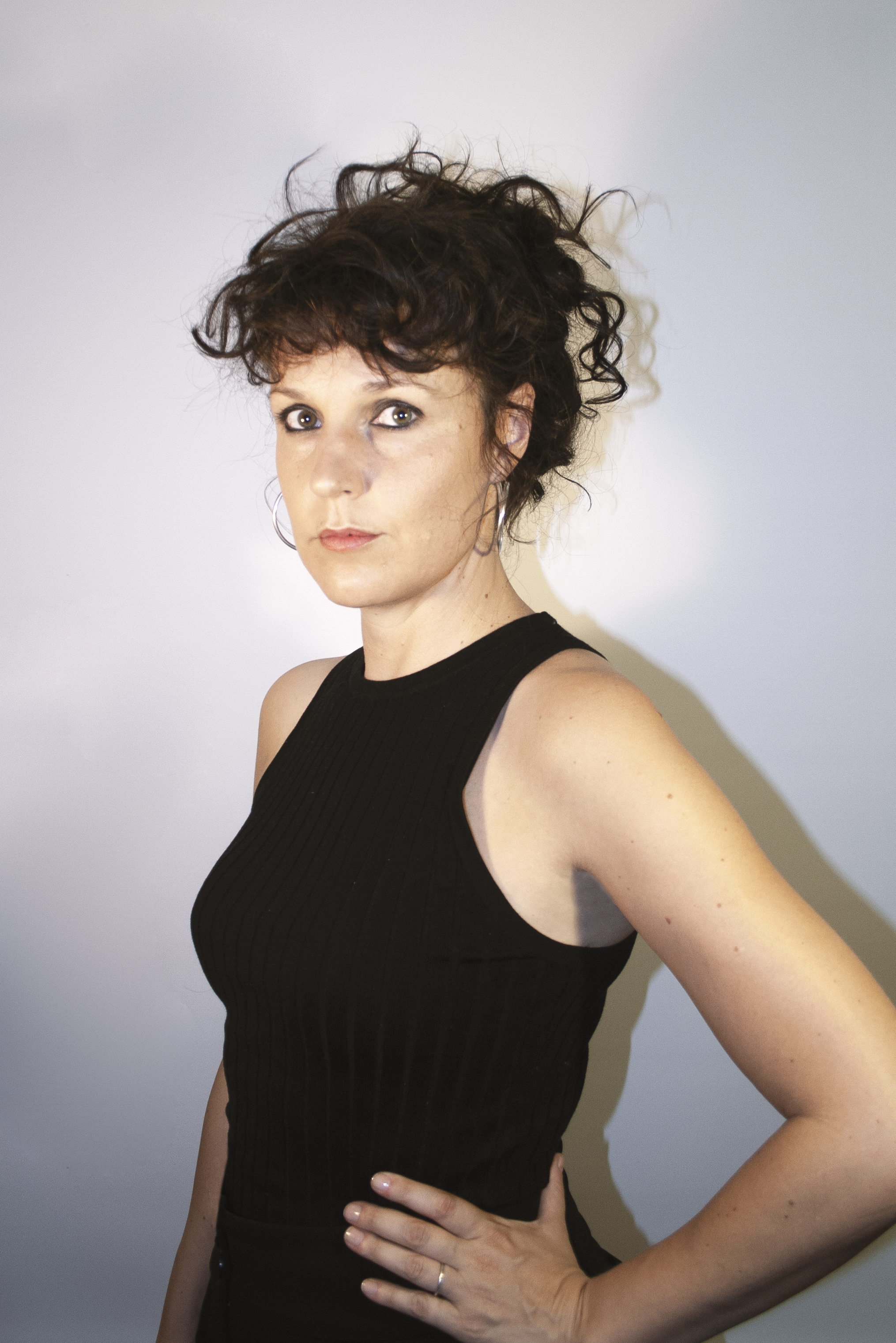

Sabina Urraca (born 1984) is a Spanish writer. She was born in San Sebastián and grew up in Tenerife.

She is a proponent of the immersive gonzo style in Spanish prose, and writes for outlets such as Vice, Tentaciones, Eldiario.es, El Comidista, Notodo, Ajoblanco, El Estado Mental, Bostezo and Madriz. She courted notoriety with her account of a BlaBlaCar ride with Álvaro de Marichalar in 2017.

In 2020, she was named as one of the most promising young writers in Spain by the 10 de 30 project run by the AECID.

== Selected publications ==
- Tus faltas de ortografía hacen llorar al niño Dios (fanzine)
- Las niñas prodigio (novel, 2017)
- Tranquilas: historias para ir solas por la noche (anthology, 2019)
