= Elena Medel =

Spanish poet (born 1985)

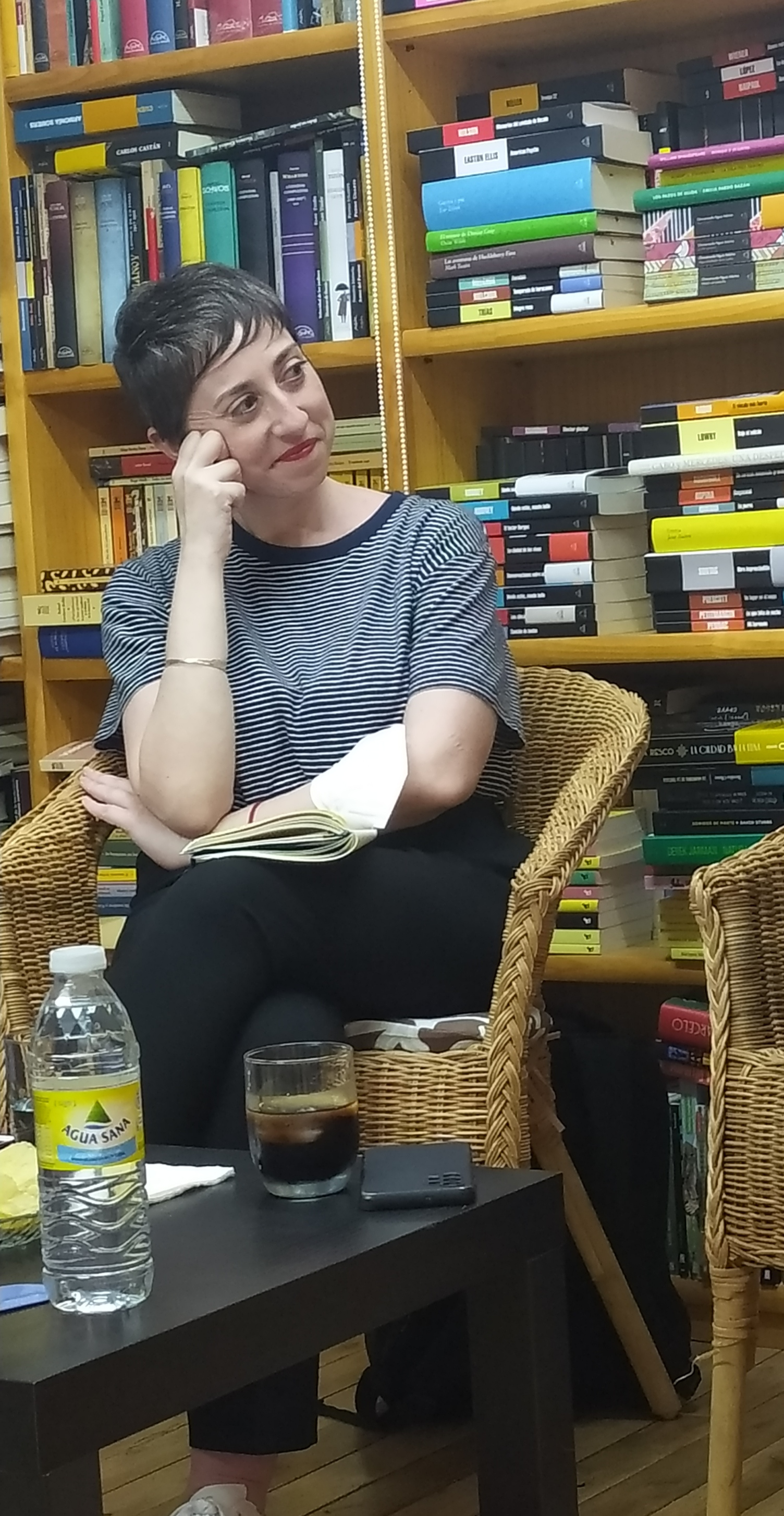
- Elena Medel in 2022
- Born: 1985 (age 40–41); Córdoba, Spain

Elena Medel (born 1985) is a Spanish poet based in Madrid. She has published many collections of poetry, and is the editorial director of La Bella Varsovia, now an imprint of the publishing house Anagrama.

== Early life and education ==
Elena Medel was born in Córdoba, Spain, in 1985.

== Career ==
Medel has published several collections of poetry, including Mi primer bikini (2001; DVD 2002; translated into English by Lizzie Davis, My First Bikini, 2015); Tara (2006); and Chatterton, which won the Loewe Young Poets Prize in 2014. She has also published chapbooks Vacaciones (2004) and Un soplo en el corazón (2007). She wrote "El mundo mago" (2015), an essay about Spanish poetAntonio Machado.

She has also republished many of her poems in the volume Un día negro en una casa de mentira (2015), and her work has been translated into several languages, including Italian and Portuguese.

She is the editorial director of La Bella Varsovia, formerly a publishing house focused on poetry. In November 2021, La Bella Varsovia became an imprint of the publishing house Anagrama, with Medel continuing as director.

== Works ==
=== Books of poetry ===
- Mi primer bikini (Premio Andalucía Joven 2001; Barcelona, DVD, 2002). 64 pages ISBN 84-95007-65-7
- Vacaciones (Almería, El Gaviero, 2004). 32 pages, ISBN 84-933751-1-X.
- Tara (Barcelona, DVD, 2006). 80 pages, ISBN 84-96238-50-4.

== Criticism ==
- Todo un placer: antología de relatos eróticos femeninos (Córdoba, Berenice, 2005). 187 pages, ISBN 84-934466-1-0.
- Epílogo de Blues Castellano, de Antonio Gamoneda (Madrid, Bartleby, 2007). 81 pages, ISBN 84-95408-64-3.
