= Juan Gómez Bárcena =

Author and literary critic

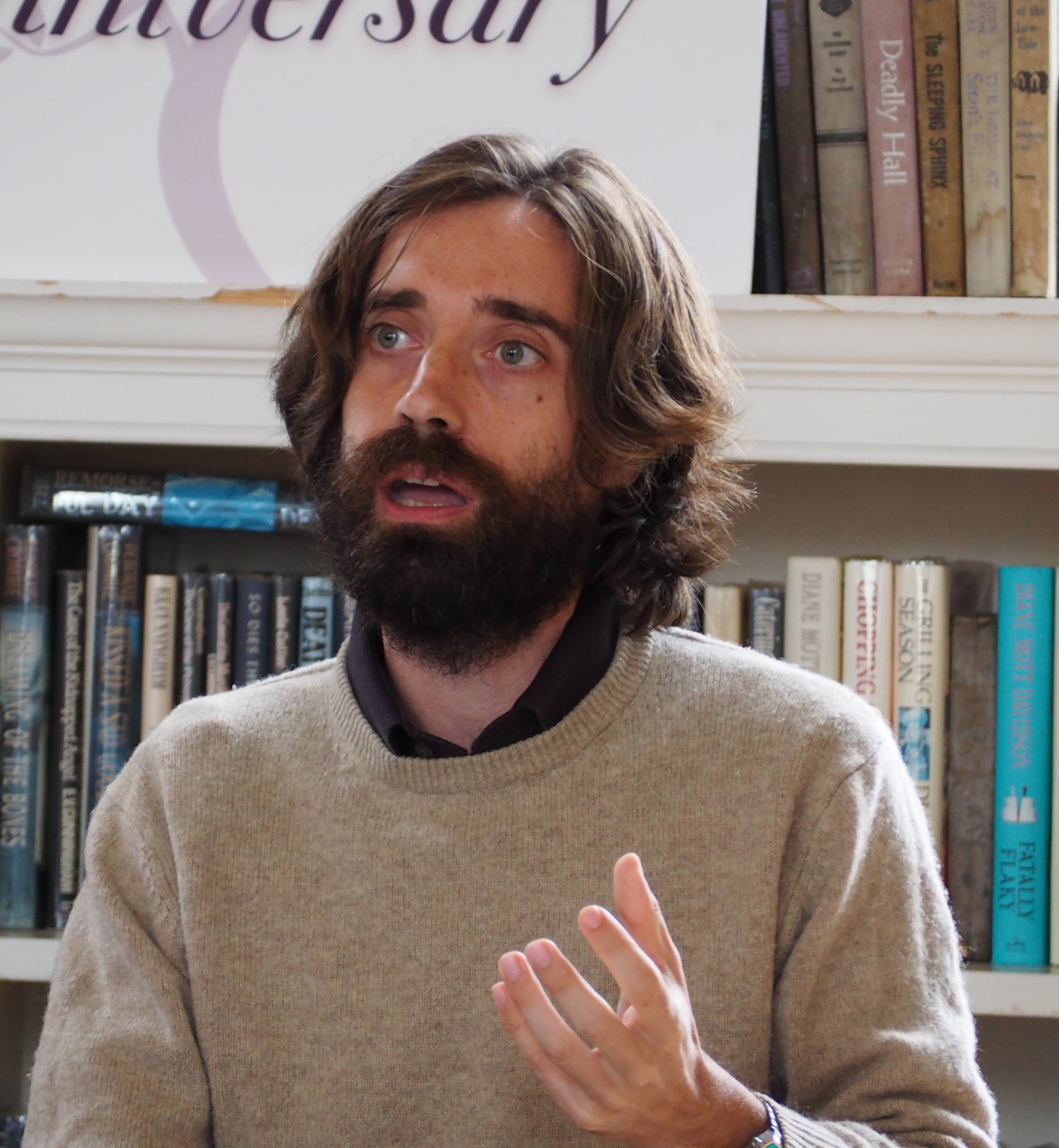
- Born: 1984 (age 41–42); Santander, Spain
- Education: Complutense University of Madrid, National University of Distance Education
- Occupations: Author, literary critic
- Writing career
- Language: Spanish
- Notable work: El cielo de Lima

Juan Gómez Bárcena (born 1984) is a Spanish author and literary critic. He was born in Santander, and studied literature and history at the Complutense University of Madrid. He also studied philosophy at the National University of Distance Education (UNED).

His first volume of stories Los que duermen (Those who sleep) was published in 2012. His acclaimed debut novel El cielo de Lima appeared in 2014, and has been translated into German. The story recounts the famous incident from 1904 when the poet Juan Ramón Jiménez engaged in correspondence with an imaginary female admirer in Lima, who in reality were two Peruvian literary pranksters.

In 2017, Bárcena published the novel Kanada. He has received a number of literary prizes. He lives in Madrid.
