= List of Spanish women writers =

This is a list of women writers who were born in Spain or whose writings are closely associated with that country.

== A ==
- Mercedes Abad (born 1961), journalist, short story writer
- Maria Dolores Acevedo (1932-1998), romance and western writer
- Brianda de Acuña (1576-1630), nun and autobiographer
- Rosario de Acuña (1850–1923), playwright, essayist, short story writer and poet
- Pilar Adón (born 1971), novelist, short story writer, poet, and translator
- Silvia Agüero (born 1985), Roma feminist writer and human rights activist
- Anna Aguilar-Amat (born 1962), Catalan-language poet, translator
- Francisca Aguirre (1930–2019), poet
- Carmen Agulló Díaz (born 1957), non-fiction writer
- Aisha (died 1010), acclaimed Arabic-language poet
- Uxue Alberdi (born 1984), Basque writer and bertsolari
- Caterina Albert (1869–1966), short story writer, novelist and poet
- Daniela Albizu (1936-2015), Basque teacher, writer, and councillor
- Núria Albó (born 1930), novelist, politician
- Aurora de Albornoz (1926–1990), poet
- Josefina Aldecoa (1926–2011), novelist
- Aurora de Albornoz (1926–1990), Galician-language poet, translator, biologist
- Concepción Aleixandre (1862–1952), gynaecologist, feminist, non-fiction writer
- Marilar Aleixandre (born 1947), writer, translator and biologist
- Jesusa Alfau Galván de Solalinde (1895–1943), novelist
- Florina Alías (1921–1999), Asturian-language author
- Maria Dolors Alibés (1941–2009), children's author
- Clara Corral Aller (1847-1908), Galician poet
- Concha Alós (1926–2011), novelist
- Amparo Alvajar (1916–1998), Galician translator, journalist, and playwright
- Nuria Amat (born 1950), writer and librarian
- Begoña Ameztoy (born 1951), writer and painter
- Miren Amuriza (born 1990), Basque writer and bertsolari
- Blanca Andreu (born 1959), poet
- Sor Ángela María de la Concepción (1649-1690), mystical writer
- Lola Anglada (c.1893–1984), writer and illustrator
- Maria Àngels Anglada (1930–1999), Catalan-language poet, novelist
- Gertrudis Anglesola (1641-1727), Valencian Cistercian abbess, mystic, autobiographer, spiritual poet
- Núria Añó (born 1973), Catalan-language novelist, short story writer, biographer, essayist
- Enriqueta Antolín (1941–2013), journalist and novelist
- Clementina Arderiu (1889–1976), Catalan-language poet
- Concepción Arenal (1820–1893), feminist writer, poet, essayist
- Xela Arias (1962–2003), Galician-language poet, translator
- Elena Arnedo (1941–2015), gynaecologist, writer and activist
- Rosa Maria Arquimbau (1910–1991), Catalan-language novelist, journalist, feminist
- Julia de Asensi (1859–1921), journalist, novelist, children's writer
- Matilde Asensi (born 1962), historical novelist, journalist
- Judith Astelarra (born 1943), Argentine-born sociologist specializing in gender studies

== B ==
- Lola Badia (born 1951), philologist, medievalist
- Inés Ballester (born 1958), journalist, cookbook writer and television presenter
- Maria Barbal (born 1949), novelist, children's writer
- Bárbara de Santo Domingo (1842-1872), Catholic mystic writer
- Elia Barceló (born 1957), academic and writing based in Austria
- Carmen Baroja (1883–1950), writer and ethnologist
- Nuria Barrios (born 1962), poet, fiction and non-fiction writer
- Lola Beccaria (born 1963), novelist
- Elísabet Benavent (born 1984), romance novelist
- Esther Bendahan (born 1964), Moroccan-born Spanish-language novelist, essayist, living in Spain
- Pilar Benejam Arguimbau (born 1937), geographer, writer and academic
- Maria Beneyto (1925–2011), poet
- Mercedes Bengoechea (born 1952), feminist sociolinguist, professor
- Elisa Beni (born 1965), journalist, novelist
- Sara Berenguer Laosa (1919–2010), poet and activist
- Consuelo Berges (1889–1988), translator, journalist, and biographer
- Mònica Bernabé (born 1972), journalist and writer
- Beatriz Bernal (between 1501 and 1504–ca. 1563) writer, and one of the first women in Spain that could be considered professional writers
- Aurora Bertrana (1892–1974), Catalan-language short story writer, novelist
- Patrocinio de Biedma y la Moneda (1858–1927), poet and novelist
- Carmen Blanco (born 1954), feminist writer, activist and academic
- Carmen Blanco y Trigueros (ca. 1840 - 1921), writer, poet, and journalist
- Montserrat Boix (born 1960), journalist
- Pilar Bonet (born 1952), journalist and non-fiction writer
- Rosario Ustáriz Borra (1927–2009), Aragonese language writer and poet
- Maria Lluïsa Borràs i Gonzàlez (1931–2010), writer and exhibition curator
- Nuria C. Botey (born 1977), science fiction, fantasy, and horror writer
- Dolors Bramon (born 1943), philologist, historian, academic and writer
- Mariam Budia (born 1970), author and playwright
- Carmen de Burgos (1867–1932), novelist, short story writer, essayist, journalist, translator
- Juby Bustamante (1938–2014), journalist
- Gabriela Bustelo (born 1962), novelist, journalist, translator

== C ==
- Fernán Caballero (1796–1877), novelist
- Amparo Cabanes Pecourt (born 1938), academic and politician
- Maria Teresa Cabré (born 1947), linguist
- Carmen Camacho (writer) (born 1976), columnist; writer of flash fiction and aphorisms
- María Cambrils (1878–1939), socialist feminist writer
- Teresa Cameselle (born 1968), writer of romantic novels and historical narratives
- Roser Caminals-Heath (fl. 1990s), Catalan novelist and translator
- María Teresa Campos (1941–2023), journalist, memoirist, humorous writer
- Zenobia Camprubí (1887–1956), Spanish-born writer, diarist, later moved to Cuba and the United States
- Matilde Camus (1919–2012), poet, non-fiction writer
- Eva Canel (1857–1932), Spanish-born writer who settled in Cuba
- Maria Aurèlia Capmany (1918–1991), Catalan novelist, playwright and essayist
- Àngels Cardona Palmer (born 1951), Catalan writer, educator and activist
- María del Carme Ribé i Ferré (1920–1991), librarian, writer and activist
- Ana Caro (1590–1646), Golden Age poet and playwright
- Maite Carranza (born 1958), educator and children's writer, mainly in Catalan
- Maria Carratalà i Van den Wouver (1899–1984), music critic, translator, playwright
- Luisa Carvajal y Mendoza (1566–1614), religious poet, writer
- Sofía Casanova (1861–1958), poet, novelist and journalist
- Borita Casas (1911–1999), journalist, playwright and children's writer
- Yolanda Castaño (born 1977), painter, literary critic and poet
- Nazareth Castellanos (born 1977), neuroscientist and popular-science writer
- Josefina Castellví (born 1935), oceanographer, non-fiction writer
- María Andrea Casamayor (1700–1780), early female science writer, two works on mathematics
- Borita Casas (1911–1999), children's writer
- Fina Casalderrey (born 1951), Galician children's writer
- Cecilia Castaño (born 1953), professor of political science and applied economics
- Yolanda Castaño (born 1977), Galician-language poet, translator
- Sofía Castañón (born 1983), poet, journalist, politician
- Luisa Castro (born 1966), novelist, poet, journalist, writing in Galician and Spanish
- Rosalía de Castro (1837–1885), romanticist poet, writings in Galician and Spanish
- Mariana de Carvajal y Saavedra (1620–1670), Golden Age writer
- Mercedes Cebrián (born 1971), poet, short story writer and translator
- Natividad Cepeda, poet, writer, and columnist
- Annabel Cervantes (born 1969), Catalan-language writer
- Mercedes Comaposada (1901–1994), educator, lawyer and writer
- Ernestina de Champourcín (1905–1999), poet
- Rosa Chacel (1898–1994), well-known novelist
- Dulce Chacón (1954–2003), poet, novelist, playwright
- Ernestina de Champourcín (1905–1999), poet
- Edith Checa Oviedo (1957–2017), writer, poet, journalist, radio host
- Matilde Cherner (1833-1880), novelist, dramatist, literary critic, and journalist
- Isabel Cheix (1839–1899), writer of historical, religious and romantic novels as well as poetry and stage plays
- Rosa María Cid López (born 1956), academic specializing in gender and women's studies
- Victoria Cirlot (born 1955), non-fiction literary writer
- Mercè Company (born 1947), writer in Spanish, Catalan and French languages
- Flavia Company (born 1963), Argentine-born Spanish novelist, poet, children's writer, writes in Catalan and Spanish
- Nieves Concostrina (born 1961), writer and journalist
- Carmen Conde Abellán (1907–1996), poet, narrative writer
- Paula Contreras Márquez (1911–2008), novelist, short story writer
- Carolina Coronado (1820–1911), popular poet, novelist, playwright
- Aixa de la Cruz (born 1988), Basque writer of novels and short stories

== D ==
- Filomena Dato (1856–1926), feminist, writer
- Mercedes Deambrosis (born 1955), Spaniard who writes in French
- Nieves Delgado (born 1968), science fiction writer and teacher
- Paloma del Río (born 1960), journalist
- Paloma Díaz-Mas (born 1954), novelist, playwright, non-fiction writer
- Eva Díaz Pérez (born 1971), journalist, essayist and academic
- Maria Doménech (1877–1952), Catalan-language writer
- María Domínguez (1882–1936), journalist, poet and politician
- María Magdalena Domínguez (1922–2021), poet
- Amalia Domingo Soler (1835–1909), novelist, poet, essayist, short story writer, autobiographer
- Maite Dono (born 1969), singer-songwriter, poet, and actress
- María Dueñas (born 1964), best-selling novelist, academic writer

== E ==
- María de Echarri (1878–1955), Catholic apologist and feminist advocate
- María Egual (1655–1735), poet and playwright
- María Luisa Elío (1926–2009), writer and actress exiled in Mexico
- Rosa de Eguílaz y Renart (born 1864, date of death unknown), playwright and journalist
- Feliciana Enríquez de Guzmán (1569–c. 1644), playwright
- Tina Escaja (born 1965), Spanish-American poet, writer and academic
- Teresa Espasa (fl. 1990s), Valencian poet, essayist and academic
- Patricia Esteban Erlés, short story writer, Zaragoza
- Lucía Etxebarría (born 1966), novelist, poet, essayist
- Luisa Etxenike (born 1957), novelist, short story writer and poet

== F ==
- Lidia Falcón (born 1935), politician and writer
- Elvira Farreras i Valentí (1913–2005), poet and essayist
- Cristina Fernández Cubas (born 1945), journalist, short story writer and novelist
- Margarita Ferreras (1900–1964), writer and poet
- Concepció Ferrer (born 1938), philologist, politician and writer
- Ángela Figuera Aymerich (1902–1984), Basque poet writing in Spanish
- Trini de Figueroa (1918-1972), romance novelist
- Pastora Filigrana (born 1981), Roma lawyer, non-fiction writer
- Alaíde Foppa (1914 – c. 1980), Spanish born poet, published in Guatemala and Mexico
- Francesca Forrellad (1927–2013), Catalan writer
- Lluïsa Forrellad (1927–2018), novelist and playwright in Spanish and Catalan
- Susana Fortes (born 1959), novelist, columnist
- Elena Fortún (1886–1952), children's writer, author of Celia, lo que dice
- Gloria Fortún (born 1977), poet
- Isabel Franc (born 1955), novelist, short story writer and essayist
- Espido Freire (born 1974), successful novelist, works translated into several languages
- Anna Freixas (born 1946), academic and writer on the subjects of aging, feminism, and psychology
- Laura Freixas (born 1958), novelist, short story writer, columnist
- Milagros Frías (born 1955), writer, journalist and literary reviewer
- Gloria Fuertes (1917–1998), poet, novelist, children's writer, playwright
- Felícia Fuster (1921–2012), Catalan-language poet, translator

== G ==
- Patrícia Gabancho (1952–2017), Argentine-born Spanish journalist who wrote in Catalan
- Belén Gache (born 1960), Argentine-born novelist, electronic poet, living in Madrid
- Ana Galán (born 1964), children's writer, humorous writer, writing in Spanish and English
- Rosa Galcerán (1917–2015), cartoonist and poet
- Adela Galiana (1825–?), Spanish writer, playwright, poet and columnist
- Beatriz Galindo (c.1465–1534), Latinist and educator
- María Rosa Gálvez de Cabrera (1768–1806), poet and playwright
- Joaquina García Balmaseda (1837–1911), journalist, poet and translator
- Cecilia García de Guilarte (1915–1989), essayist, playwright, novelist and journalist
- Berta García Faet (born 1988), poet and translator
- María Esther García López (born 1948), poet and writer; president, Asturias Writers Association
- Adelaida García Morales (1945–2014), novelist, actress
- Yolanda García Serrano (born 1958), scriptwriter and playwright
- Olvido García Valdés (born 1950), poet, biographer, translator
- Fanny Garrido (1846–1917), Galician writer and translator
- Blanca de Gassó y Ortiz (1846–1877), writer and poet
- Consuelo Gil (1905–1995), publisher of children's illustrated magazines, writer, translator, and editor
- Alicia Giménez Bartlett (born 1951), detective novelist
- Teresa Giménez Barbat (born 1955), anthropologist, writer and politician
- Concepción Gimeno de Flaquer (1850-1919), writer, editor, feminist, traveler
- Lupe Gómez (born 1972), Galician-language poet, literary critic, columnist
- Mar Gómez Glez (born 1977), playwright and novelist
- Paloma Gómez Borrero (1934–2017), journalist and writer
- Eloísa Gómez-Lucena, contemporary novelist, non-fiction writer, historian
- Consuelo González Ramos (1877–?), journalist and feminist
- Enriqueta González Rubín (1832–1877), novelist and writer in Asturian
- Belén Gopegui (born 1963), novelist, journalist
- Dolores Gortázar Serantes (1872–1936), novelist, journalist and activist
- María Goyri de Menéndez Pidal (1873–1955), literary critic, poet, feminist
- Almudena Grandes (1960–2021), erotic novelist, short story writer
- María José Guerra Palmero (born 1962), philosopher, non-fiction writer, and feminist theorist
- Olga Guirao (born 1956), novelist
- Carmela Gutiérrez de Gambra (1921-1984), Spanish scholar, translator, romance novelist, Christian feminist
- Goya Gutiérrez (born 1954), poet

== H ==
- Úrsula Heinze (born 1941), poet, novelist, essayist, short story writer and children's writer
- Francisca Herrera Garrido (1869–1950), Galician-language novelist, poet
- María Gertrudis Hore (1742–1801), poet
- Begoña Huertas (1965–2022), writer, philologist and journalist

== I ==
- Carmen de Icaza (1899–1979), novelist
- María Antonia Iglesias (1945–2014), journalist, non-fiction writer
- Lola Iturbe (1902–1990), trade unionist and journalist
- Mari Carmen Izquierdo (1950–2019), pioneering sports journalist

== J ==
- Maria de la Pau Janer (born 1966), Catalan-language novelist
- Clara Janés (born 1940), acclaimed poet, novelist, essayist, translator
- Palmira Jaquetti i Isant (1895–1963), folklorist, poet, and writer
- Luzmaría Jiménez Faro (1937-2015), writer, essayist, anthologist, poet, and editor
- Isabel de Josa (c.1508–1575), Catalan writer
- Inés Joyes y Blake (1731–1808), translator and feminist essayist
- Juana Teresa Juega López (1885–1979), Galician-language poet
- Conxita Julià (1920–2019), Catalan-language poet
- Cristina Jurado (born 1972), science fiction and fantasy writer and editor

== K ==
- Carmen Karr (1865–1943), feminist and journalist
- Alicia Kopf (born 1982), novelist and academic

== L ==
- Ángela Labordeta (born 1967), novelist, journalist
- María Elvira Lacaci(1916–1997), Galician poet
- Carmen Laforet (1921–2004), existentialist novelist, short story writer
- Regina de Lamo (1870–1947), pianist, writer, journalist and activist
- Margarita Landi (1918–2004), journalist and television presenter
- Paula Lapido (born 1945), short story writer
- María Teresa León (1903–1988), novelist, short story writer, playwright, children's writer, columnist
- Rogelia León (1828–1870), poet, playwright, essayist, and narrative writer
- Rosa Leveroni (1910–1985), Catalan-language poet
- Gemma Lienas (born 1951), writer, feminist activist, politician
- Lucía Lijtmaer (born 1977), journalist, writer
- Elvira Lindo (born 1962), journalist, novelist, playwright
- Eulàlia Lledó (born 1952), philologist and non-fiction writer
- Ángeles López de Ayala (1858–1926), playwright, journalist and activist
- Leonor López de Córdoba (1362–1430), Spain's earliest autobiographer
- Marian Lopez Fernandez-Cao (born 1964), academic, curator and art writer
- Mariló López Garrido (born 1963)
- Rosaura Lopez (1932–2005), maid who wrote about John Lennon
- Enriqueta Lozano (1829/30 - 1895), writer
- Irene Lozano (born 1971), writer, journalist and politician
- Josephine Lys (fl 2007), romance novelist

== M ==
- Ángeles Maestro (born 1952), Spanish politician
- Chantal Maillard (born 1951), poet, essayist, non-fiction works on philosophy
- Helena Maleno (born 1970), journalist, writer and activist
- Maria Mercè Marçal (1952–1998), Catalan-language poet, translator
- Carolina Marcial Dorado (1889–1941), educator and writer based in USA
- Inés Marful (born 1965), scholar
- María Mariño (1907–1967), Galician writer
- Inka Martí (born 1964), journalist, editor, writer and photographer
- Dolores Martí de Cid (1916-1993), expert on Latin American theater and literature; non-fiction writer
- Carmen Martín Gaite (1925–2000), novelist, short story writer, essayist, playwright, children's writer
- Inés Martín Rodrigo (born 1983), writer and cultural journalist, winner of Premio Nadal
- Ana María Martínez Sagi (1907–2000), poet, journalist, feminist and trade unionist
- Laia Martínez i López (born 1984), poet and translator
- Susana Martinez-Conde (born 1969), Spanish-American researcher, non-fiction writer
- Raquel Martínez-Gómez (born 1973), novelist
- Toti Martínez de Lezea (born 1949), novelist, translator, writing in Spanish and Basque
- Maria del Pilar Maspons i Labrós (1841–1907), poet and novelist
- María Josefa Massanés (1811–1887), poet
- Pilar Mateos (born 1942), children's writer
- Ana María Matute (1925–2014), highly acclaimed novelist, short story writer
- Megan Maxwell (born 1965), romantic chick lit novelist
- Patricia Mayayo (born 1967), non-fiction writer
- Antonia Maymón (1881–1959), novelist and non-fiction writer
- Margarita de Mayo Izarra (1889–1969), journalist and teacher
- Marina Mayoral (born 1942), novelist, essayist
- Miren Agur Meabe (born 1962), Basque writer and translator
- Elena Medel (born 1985), poet, literary critic
- Susana Medina (born 1966), poetry and prose in Spanish and English
- Concha Méndez (1898–1986), poet, playwright, member of Generation of '27
- Rosa Méndez Fonte (born 1957), Galician poet, writer, and researcher
- Ana Merino (born 1971), poet, novelist, educator, living in the United States
- Sara Mesa (born 1976), poet and novelist
- Ana María Moix (1947–2014), poet, novelist, short story writer, translator
- Selena Millares (born 1963), poet, essayist and academic
- Montserrat Minobis i Puntonet (1942–2019), journalist and academic
- Laura Mintegi (born 1965), novelist, politician and academic
- Pilar Molina Llorente (born 1943), children's writer
- Empar Moliner (born 1966), writer and journalist
- Dolors Monserdà (1845–1919), poet, novelist and playwright
- Rosa Montero (born 1951), journalist, acclaimed novelist
- Carmen Montoriol Puig (1893–1966), Catalan poet, playwright, translator
- Federica Montseny (1905–1994), novelist, essayist, politician
- María Luz Morales (1889–1980), pioneering cultural journalist and writer
- María Victoria Moreno (1939–2005), children's writer, poet and essayist, writing in both Spanish and Galician
- Teresa Moure (born 1969), Galician-language essayist, novelist, children's writer
- Elisabeth Mulder (1904–1987), poet, novelist, short story writer
- Estefanía Muñiz (born 1974), poet and scriptwriter
- Isabel Muñoz-Caravaca (1838–1915), journalist writer and labour activist
- Anna Murià (1904–2002), short story writer, novelist, children's writer, essayist

== N ==
- Elvira Navarro (born 1978), novelist and short story writer
- Julia Navarro (born 1953), best-selling novelist, journalist, novels widely translated but not into English
- Cecilia del Nacimiento (1570–1646), nun, mystic, writer, and poet
- Margarita Nelken (1894–1968), feminist and writer
- Marysa Navarro (1934–2025), academic and essayist
- Carmen Nonell (1920–?), novelist
- Olga Novo (born 1975), Galician-language poet, essayist

== O ==
- Carlota O'Neill (1905–2000), novelist, non-fiction writer and journalist
- Mercedes Odina (born 1959), journalist, non-fiction writer
- Maria Antònia Oliver Cabrer (1946–2022), Catalan-language novelist, short story writer, translator
- Lourdes Oñederra (born 1957), Basque-language novelist, short story writer, academic works on linguistics
- Rocío Orsi (1976-2014), essayist, translator
- Lourdes Ortiz (born 1943), novelist, poet, essayist, translator
- Marisol Ortiz de Zárate (born 1960), children's writer
- María Oruña (born 1976), crime novelist and columnist
- Constanza Ossorio (1595–1637), poet and writer
- Isabel Oyarzábal Smith (1878–1974), feminist writer, journalist, diplomat

== P ==
- Pilar Pallarés (born 1957), Galician poet
- Primi Nécega (1930 – 2024), Galician writer.
- Teresa Pàmies (1919–2012), non-fiction Catalan writer
- Emilia Pardo Bazán, novelist, journalist, essayist, critic, associated with the naturalistic movement
- Ana Pardo de Vera (born 1974), journalist and newspaper editor
- Victòria Peña i Nicolau,(1827–1898), Mallorcan poet
- Pilar Pedraza (born 1951), novelist and essayist
- Paloma Pedrero (born 1957), actress and playwright
- Ánxeles Penas (born 1943), poet
- María Dolores Pérez Enciso (1908–1949), journalist, essayist
- Mónica Pérez de las Heras (born 1965), journalist, writer and academic
- Isabel Pérez Montalbán (born 1964), poet
- Narcisa Pérez Reoyo (1849–1876), writer
- Gloria Pérez-Salmerón (born 1958), national librarian and writer
- Núria Perpinyà (born 1961), Catalan-language novelist, essayist
- Marta Pessarrodona (born 1941), poet, literary critic, essayist, biographer
- Julia Piera (born 1970), poet
- Maria del Pilar Maspons i Labrós (1841–1907), poet, novelist, folklorist
- Aurora Picornell, political activist and martyr
- Berta Piñán (born 1963), writer, poet, politician
- Florencia del Pinar (15th century), early female poet
- Valentina Pinelo (17th century), religious writer
- Irene Polo (1909–1942), journalist and translator
- Núria Pompeia (1931–2016), cartoonist, journalist and writer in both Spanish and Catalan
- Marta Portal (1930–2016), novelist, short story writer and essayist
- Luz Pozo Garza (1922–2020), poet
- Nativel Preciado (born 1948), journalist and non-fiction writer
- Isabel Prieto de Landázuri (1833–1876), poet and dramatist

== Q ==
- Ana Rosa Quintana (born 1956), journalist and television presenter
- Rebeca Quintáns (born 1964), journalist and research writer
- Elena Quiroga (1921–1995), novelist

== R ==
- Llucia Ramis (born 1977), journalist and novelist
- Dolores Redondo (born 1969), novelist
- Rosa Regàs (1933–2024), novelist, columnist
- María del Carmen Reina Jiménez (born 1942), essayist, writer, activist, and politician
- Charlotte Remfry (1869–1957), writer and translator
- Eugenia Rico (born 1972), novelist, poet, journalist
- Lolo Rico (1935–2019), children's writer and television producer
- Carme Riera (born 1948), Catalan-language novelist, essayist, short story writer, critic, also writes in Spanish
- Pilar del Río (born 1950), journalist, writer and translator
- Blanca de los Ríos (1862–1956), novelist, essayist and painter
- Marta Rivera de la Cruz (born 1970), novelist
- Margarita Rivière (1944–2015), journalist and non-fiction writer
- Marta Robles (born 1963), writer of fiction and non-fiction, television scriptwriter and presenter
- Maria Mercè Roca (born 1958), Catalan short story writer, novelist, politician
- Cristina Rodríguez (born 1972), French-language journalist, novelist
- Fátima Rodríguez (born 1961), writer, translator, professor
- Mercè Rodoreda (October 10, 1908 – April 13, 1983), Catalan novelist
- Cristina Rodríguez (born 1972), journalist, historian and novelist who writes in French
- Fanny Rubio (born 1949), novelist and literary critic

== S ==
- Oliva Sabuco (1562–c.1622), medical and psychological works
- Faustina Sáez de Melgar (1834–1895), novelist, poet and essayist
- Concepción Saiz Otero (1851-1934), teacher, pedagogue, feminist, and writer
- Juana Salabert (born 1962), writer, journalist, literary critic and translator
- Ada Salas (born 1965), poet and educator
- María Salas Larrazábal (1922–2008), writer, journalist
- Mercedes Salisachs (1916–2014), novelist, short story writer
- Marcela de San Félix (1605–1687), poet, religious writer
- Isabel San Sebastián (born 1959), journalist, writer and broadcaster
- Clara Sánchez (born 1955), novelist
- Cristina Sánchez-Andrade (born 1968), novelist and translator
- Carmelina Sánchez-Cutillas i Martínez del Romero (1921-2009), historian, novelist and poet
- Cèlia Sànchez-Mústich (born 1954), Catalan-language poet, short story writer
- Lucía Sánchez Saornil (1895–1970), poet and feminist
- Encarna Sant-Celoni i Verger (born 1959), narrative writer, poet and translator
- Elena Santiago (1941–2021), novelist and short story writer
- Care Santos (born 1970), journalist and novelist writing in Spanish and Catalan
- Paloma Sánchez-Garnica (born 1962), novelist
- Lucía Sánchez Saornil (1895–1970), poet, feminist writer
- Encarna Sant-Celoni i Verger (born 1959), Valencian poet, narrative writer
- Elena Santiago (1941–2021), novelist, short story, and children's writer
- Ana Santos Aramburo (born 1957), national librarian and writer
- Care Santos (born 1970), novelist, children's writer, writes in Catalan and Spanish
- Belén de Sárraga (1874–1951), journalist
- Marta Sanz (born 1967), novelist and poet
- Francisca Sarasate (1853-1922), fiction, non-fiction, poetry
- Elvira Sastre (born 1992), poet and translator
- Marta Segarra (born 1963), essayist
- Berta Serra Manzanares (born 1958), poet and novelist
- Emilia Serrano y García (1834-1923), writer, journalist, feminist, traveler
- Luisa Sigea de Velasco (1522–1560), poet, wrote mainly in Latin
- Isabel-Clara Simó (1943–2020), Catalan-language journalist and writer
- María del Pilar Sinués de Marco (1835-1893), novelist, poet, non-fiction writer
- Teresa Solana (born 1962), crime novelist
- Carme Solé Vendrell (born 1944), illustrator and children's writer
- Mariana de Silva-Bazán y Sarmiento, (1739-1784), aristocrat, poet, translator, painter
- Sílvia Soler i Guasch (born 1961), Catalan-language writer and journalist
- Maria Assumpció Soler i Font (1913–2004), Catalan writer and journalist
- Dolores Soler-Espiauba (born 1935), novelist
- Anna Soler-Pont (born 1968), writer
- Cristina Spínola (born 1976), journalist, athlete, YouTuber

== T ==
- Sofía Tartilán (1829–1888), novelist, essayist, journalist, editor
- Corín Tellado (1927–2009), novelist
- Ana Tena (born 1966), Aragonese short story writer
- Teresa de Cartagena (15th century), early feminist, autobiographer
- Teresa of Ávila (1515–1582), mystical writer
- Mònica Terribas i Sala (born 1968), Catalan journalist, educator, broadcasting executive
- Josefina de la Torre (1907–2002), poet, novelist, opera singer, actress
- Carme Torras (born 1956), computer scientist, technical writer and novelist
- Maruja Torres (born 1943), journalist
- Sara Torres (born 1991), poet and novelist
- Xohana Torres (1929–2017), poet, playwright and novelist
- Laura Tremosa (born 1937), engineer, feminist, non-fiction writer
- Esther Tusquets (1936–2012), publisher, novelist, essayist

== U ==
- Rosana Ubanell (born 1958), journalist, detective story novelist
- Pilar Urbano (born 1940), journalist and non-fiction writer
- Arantxa Urretabizkaia (born 1947), Basque-language novelist, screenwriter, poet
- Mari Jose Urruzola (1940–2006), Spanish Basque educator, feminist, writer
- Carmina Useros (1928–2017), writer, ceramist, painter, and cultural manager

== V ==
- Amelia Valcarcel (born 1950), philosopher, feminist, non-fiction writer
- Pilar de Valderrama (1889–1879), poet and playwright
- Muriel Villanueva i Perarnau (born 1976), novelist, short story writer, children's writer, poet
- Curri Valenzuela (born 1945), journalist and non-fiction writer
- Julieta Valero (born 1971), poet
- Maria Vallejo-Nágera (born 1964), novelist
- Ángela Vallvey (born 1964), children's writer, novelist
- Brigitte Vasallo (born 1973), writer and social activist
- Ana María Vázquez Hoys (born 1945), non-fiction writer, historic novelist, historian
- María Teresa de Vega, novelist and poet
- Maria Verger (1892–1983), archivist, librarian and poet in Catalan and Spanish
- Isabel Vericat (born 1970), author and translator
- Antònia Vicens (born 1941), short story writer, novelist, children's writer, writes in Catalan
- Marika Vila (born 1949), Spanish comics artist and writer; graphic novelist
- Beatriz Villacañas (born 1964), poet, essayist, critic

== Y ==
- Eva Yárnoz (born 1975), poet and visual artist

== W ==
- Sultana Wahnón (born 1960), essayist, literary critic and academic

== X ==
- Ester Xargay Melero (1960-2024), poet, video artist, translator and cultural agitator
- Olga Xirinacs Díaz (born 1936), poet, playwright, essayist and children's writer
- Xosefa Xovellanos (1745–1807), Asturian poet

== Z ==
- María Zambrano (1904–1991), essayist, philosopher, belonged to the Generation of '36
- María de Zayas (1590–1661), pioneer of literary feminism
- Asunción de Zea-Bermúdez (1862-1936), writer and essayist
- Pilar de Zubiaurre (1884–1970), essayist, letter writer

== See also ==
- List of women writers
- List of Spanish-language authors
