= Ossorio =

Ossorio is a surname. Notable people with the surname include:

- Alfonso A. Ossorio (1916–1990), Filipino American artist
- Amando de Ossorio (1918–2001), Spanish film director
- Ángel Ossorio y Gallardo (1873-1946), Spanish lawyer and statesman
- Aníbal González Álvarez-Ossorio (1876–1929), Spanish architect
- Beatriz de Bobadilla y Ossorio (1462–1501), ruler of La Gomera
- Constanza Ossorio (1595–1637), Spanish poet and writer
- Filippo Alferio Ossorio (1634–1693), Italian Catholic prelate
- Peter G. Ossorio (1926–2007), American psychologist
