= Rosaura =

Rosaura is a female given name.

Rosaura may refer to:

== People ==
- Rosaura Andreu, an American actress
- Rosaura Lopez, a Spanish author
- Rosaura Revueltas, a Mexican actress
- Rosaura Zapata, a Mexican educator

== Ships ==
- MY Rosaura, a luxury yacht
- HMS Rosaura, an armed boarding vessel

== Other ==
- Rosaura at 10 O'Clock, an Argentine film
- Rosaura, an obsolete genus of telescopefish
- Rosaura, a major character of the novel Like Water for Chocolate and its adaptations
