= Borita Casas =

Spanish author (1911–1999)

Liboria 'Borita' Casas Regueiro (1911 – 1999) was a Spanish Journalist, playwright and author of children's books, creator of the well-known character Antoñita la Fantástica ("Fantastic Antonia").

In 1948, as a radio announcer on Radio Madrid Borita invented the character Antoñita la Fantástica and went on to write two plays and 12 books which saw moderate success in the 1940s and 1950s. From 1955 to 1966, Borita was married and lived in Mexico then returned to Spain.

== See also ==
- Spanish literature
