= Muriel Villanueva i Perarnau =

Spanish writer (born 1976)

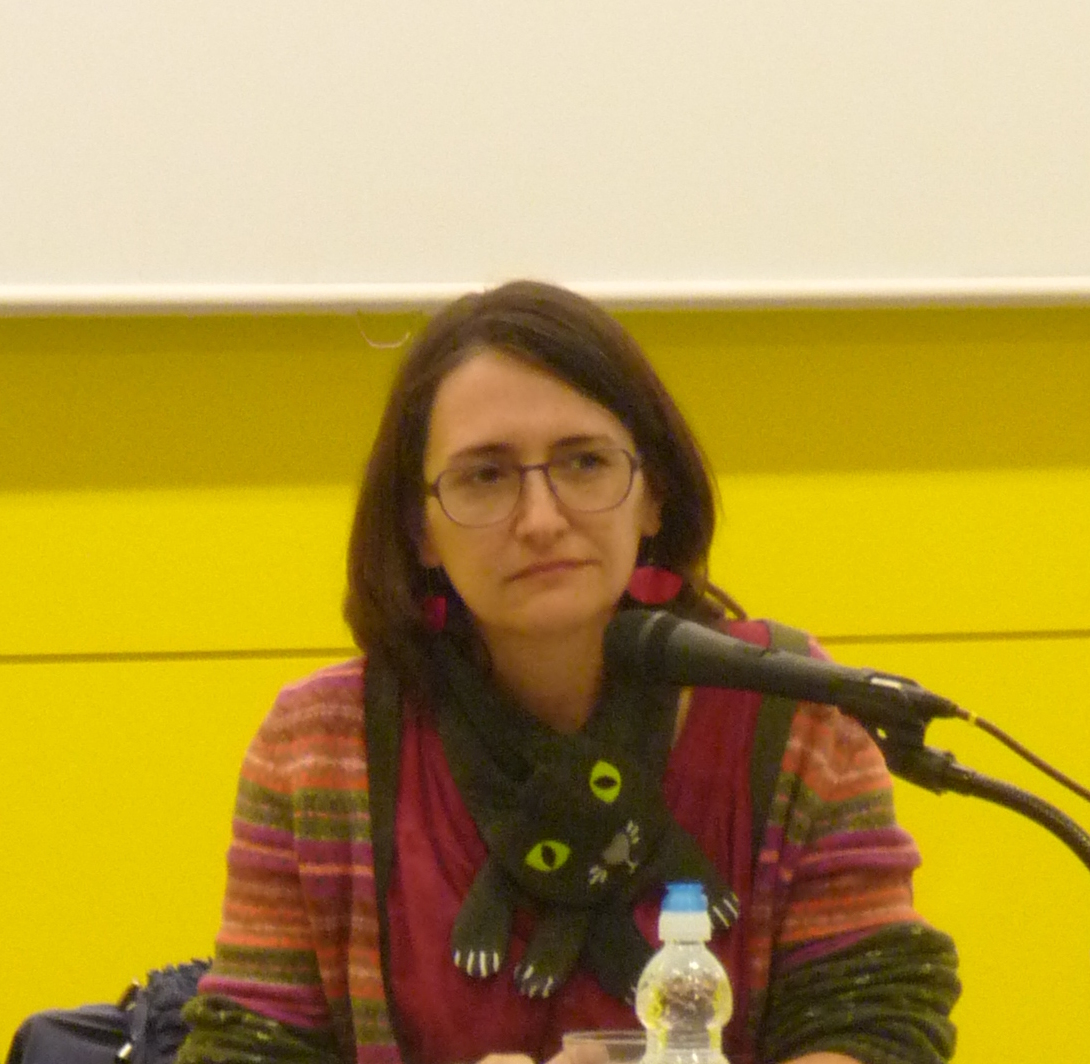
- Villanueva in 2014
- Born: 1976 (age 49–50); Valencia, Spain
- Education: University of Barcelona; University of Valencia
- Occupation: Writer
- Website: murielvillanueva.com/en/home-2/

Muriel Villanueva i Perarnau (Valencia, 1976) is a Spanish writer. With a degree in Literary theory and Comparative literature from the University of Barcelona and a diploma in Music education from the University of Valencia, she was a professor at the School of Writing at the University of Barcelona between 2006 and 2014. Subsequently, she works as a writing teacher with several organizations. In 2020, she received one of the grants for literary creation from the Institució de les Lletres Catalanes for the project El refugi del Tarek 2.

== Awards and honours ==
- 1997 - Goma de Nata Award (with the work Els Ulls de Rita o la tendresa del món - Diari del viatge per l'adopció d'una germana)
- 2009 - Montflorit Award for Novel (with the work Jo toco i tu balles)
- 2009 - Arrelats Prize of the University of Barcelona (with the story "Venia picant de mans")
- 2010 - Jury Mention of the 2010 Documenta Award (with the work La gatera)
- 2011 - Just Manuel Casero Award from Llibreria 22 in Girona (with the work La gatera)
- 2011 - Les Talúries Award from the Institute of Ilerdencs Studies (with the poetry collection Poemes san punts goma)
- 2013 - Valencian Writers Critic Award, by the AELC (with the work La gatera)
- 2016 - Finalist of the Atrapallibres Award, by the Catalan Council of LIJ (with the work Duna)
- 2018 - Carlemany Prize for the promotion of reading, from the Government of Andorra (with the work Rut Sense Hac)
- 2019 - Finalist of the Atrapallibres Award, by the Catalan Council of LIJ (with the work El refugi del Tarek)
- 2019 - Finalist of the Menjallibres Award, young readers of Vilanova (with the work Rut Sense Hac)
- 2019 - Prize for children's and youth narrative in Valencian City of Dénia (with the work L'illa infinita)
- 2020 - Premi Llibreter (with the youth novel Dunes)
- 2020 - Antoni Vidal Ferrando Award (with the novel El ball de les stornelles)
- 2020 - Atrapallibres Award, from the Catalan Children and Youth Literature Council (with the children's novel El refugi del Tarek)

== Selected works ==
=== Novels ===
- Mares, i si sortim de l'armari? : la història d'una família quasi feliç, 2006 ISBN 978-84-9787-161-7
- Jo toco i tu balles, 2009 ISBN 978-84-95705-86-0
- Baracoa, 2010
- La gatera, 2012
- Motril 86, 2013
- El parèntesi d'esquerre, 2016
- Rut Sense Hac, 2018
- París es Azu, 2019
- El ball de les estornelles, 2020
- Semiidèntics, 2021

=== Short story collections ===
- Família, 2009
- La paradoxa d'en Frank Kafka i l'àncora del Fred Tènder, 2009
- Venia picant de mans, 2009
- Línia discontínua, 2010
- Megafonia, 2012
- Dos mil botons i una tassa de xocolata, dins l'antologia Els caus secrets, 2013
- La nena de les cuetes – La niña de las coletas, 2015
- Estimat país petit, 2018
- Sols em queda la gloriosa companyia de la vostra sacratíssima corona, dins l'antologia República de les lletres, 2019

=== Children's and youth literature ===
- La Tània i totes les tortugues, 2013
- Duna, diari d'un estiu. Duna, diario de un verano, 2015
- La Esfera o L'Esfera: Sin alas, Las alas de Ícaro, El vuelo del Fénix.. Trilogy with Roger Coch (Muriel Rogers), 2016
- La Tània i el telescopi (illustrated by Ona Caussa), 2016
- Groc i rodó. Amarillo y redondo (illustrated by Ferran Orta, 2018
- El refugi del Tarek (illustrated by Bruno Hidalgo), 2018
- Ona i Roc i els tigres de Sumatra (illustrated by Julia Cejas), 2019
- La biblioteca del papa Luna (illustrated by Sara Bellés), 2019
- L'illa infinita (illustrated by Noemí Villamuza), 2019
- Dunes, diari d'un altre estiu. Dunas, diario de otro verano (illustrated by Ferran Orta), 2019
- Digueu-me Ju, 2020
- La Paula i el colibrí (illustrated by Albert Asensio), 2021
- On vas, Tarek? (illustrated by Bruno Hidalgo), 2021
- Al fil de seda, 2022

=== Poetry collections ===
- Poemes sense punts de goma, 2011
- Para no tener que hablar (illustrated by Sara Márquez), 2016
