= Mar Gómez Glez =

Spanish playwright and novelist

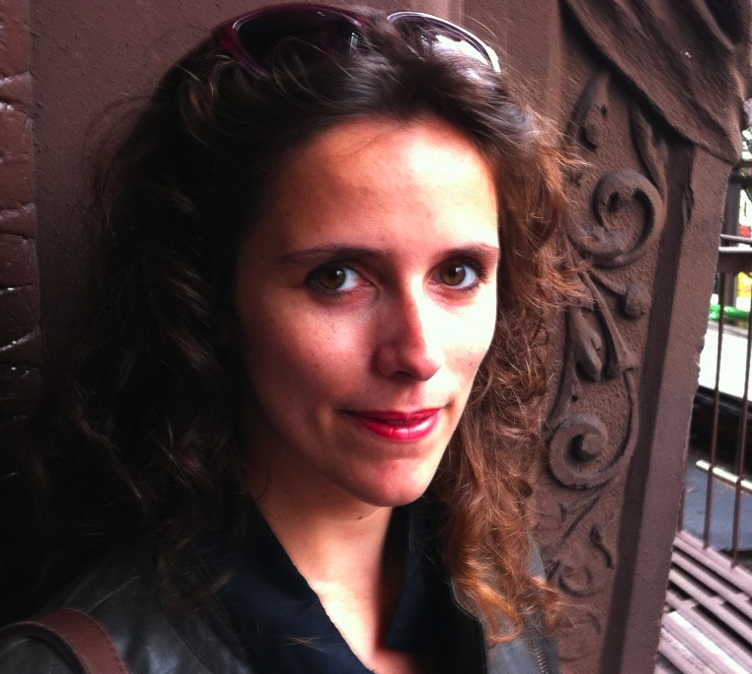
Spanish writer Mar Gómez Glez in 2012, New York

Mar Gómez Glez (Madrid, 1977) is a Spanish playwright and novelist.

Gómez Glez's plays have been produced in Spain, India, Germany and the US. Her work has premiered Off-Broadway, (Wearing Lorca’s Bowtie, Duke on 42nd Street, 2011) and Off-Off-Broadway (39 Defaults, TeatroStageFest, Casa Mezcal, and La MaMa Experimental Theatre Club, 2012-2014).

Gómez Glez is the author of three books, the most recent of which is La edad ganada (2015).

Gómez Glez was the first Hot Desk International Playwright at Center Stage (Baltimore, 2015) and invited playwright at the Royal Court International Residency in 2009. Gómez Glez holds a Ph.D. from New York University, has been a lecturer at University of Southern California and is Visiting Assistant Professor at Bard College.

Her work has received global recognition, including the 2011 Calderón de la Barca Theater Award, the 2008 Arte Joven Latina Award, and the 2007 Beckett Theater Award.
