= Mónica Pérez de las Heras =

Spanish journalist, writer and teacher

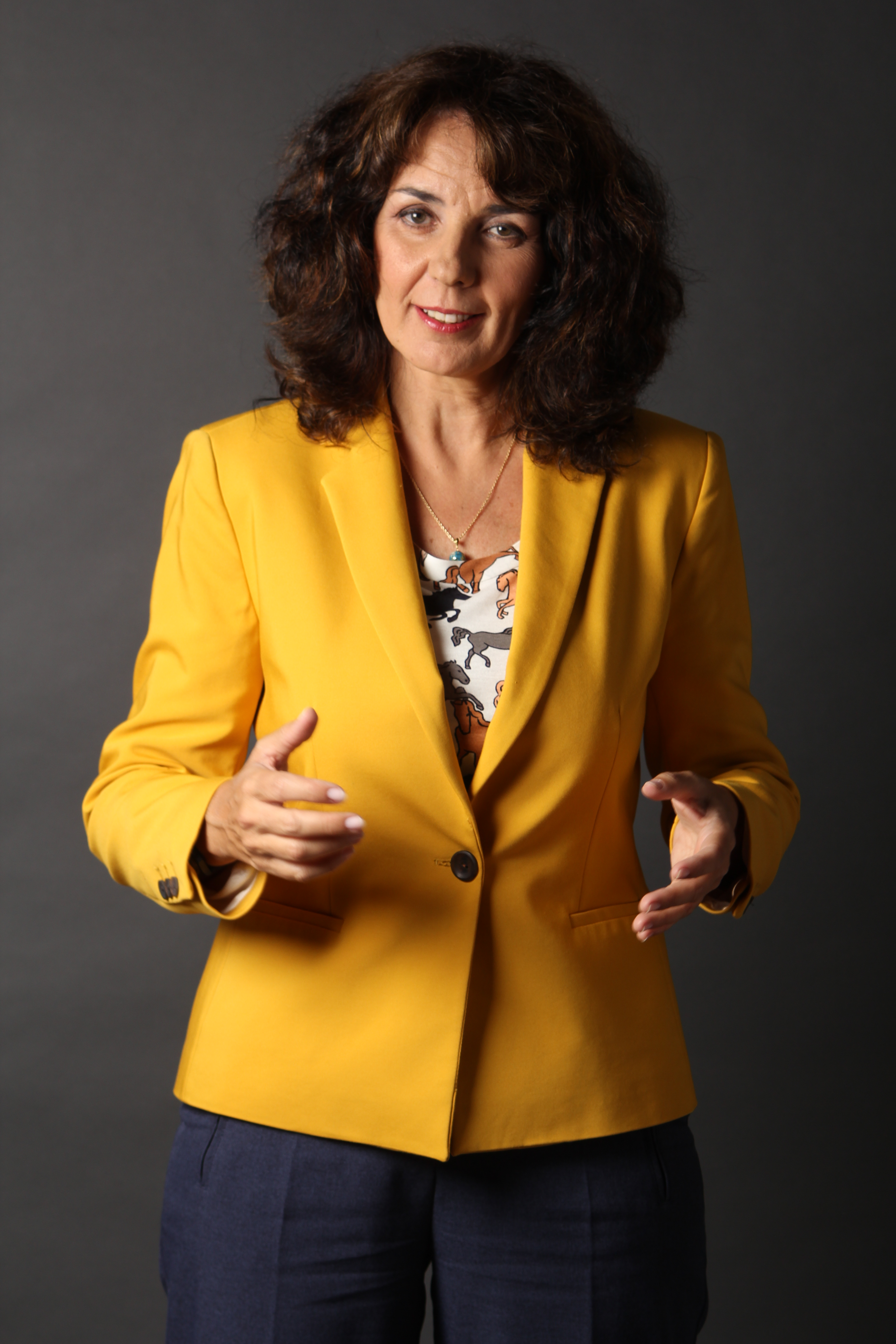
- Born: March 5, 1965 (age 61); Madrid, Spain
- Occupations: Journalist, writer, teacher
- Known for: Public speaking
- Website: monicaperezdelasheras.com

Mónica Pérez de las Heras (born 1965) is a Spanish journalist, writer, and teacher, the director of the European School of Oratory.

== Biography ==
With a licentiate in information sciences from the Complutense University of Madrid, Mónica Pérez de las Heras began her career as an environmental journalist, during which time she wrote four books on the subject. She also has the title of personal coach and master practitioner in neuro-linguistic programming. (Note: There is no restriction on who can describe themselves as an NLP Master Practitioner and there are a multitude of certifying associations.)

She later focused her work on oratory and its teaching. She has offered courses of oratory and communication to companies, foundations, university centers such as the Complutense University of Madrid and the University of Navarra, and public entities such as the National Institute of Public Administration, hospitals, unions, and political parties. In 2012 she founded the European School of Oratory (EEO) in Madrid. This work has been complemented by the publication of twelve books, including two on Barack and Michelle Obama.

In addition to her public speaking courses and workshops, she is a featured speaker for Thinking Heads. Her TikTok videos on overcoming fear and public speaking are popular.

== Publications ==
=== On the environment ===
- La Conservación de la naturaleza (1997), ISBN 9788448302658
- La Guía del Ecoturismo (1999), ISBN 9788484765547
- La Cumbre de Johannesburgo (2002), ISBN 9788484761006
- Manual del Turismo Sostenible (2004), ISBN 9788484761792

=== On communication and oratory ===
- El secreto de Obama (2009), ISBN 9788483561164
- ¿Estás comunicando? (2010), ISBN 9788483561515
- Palabra de Primera Dama. Michelle Obama (2011), ISBN 9788483564172
- Escribe, Habla, Seduce (2013), ISBN 9788483567135
- Comunicación y Oratoria con PNL e Inteligencia Emocional (2015), ISBN 9781537786902
- Oratoria con PNL para Profesionales del Derecho (2016), ISBN 9781539668664
- PNL para Directivos (2016), ISBN 9781537268897
- PNL para Escritores de Discursos (2016), ISBN 9781537247373
- PNL para Maestros y Profesores (2016), ISBN 9781537491134
- PNL para Periodistas (2016), ISBN 9781537407890
- PNL para Profesionales de la Salud (2016), ISBN 9781537491097
- Programación Neurolingüística para Políticos (2016), ISBN 9781537491080
- Oratoria con PNL: Claves de inteligencia emocional y programación neurolingüística para hablar en público (2018), ISBN 978-1718082953
- 100 actividades para hablar en público en el aula: Oratoria para colegios e institutos (2021), ISBN 979 8638960919
