= Elvira Farreras i Valentí =

Spanish writer

Elvira Farreras i Valentí (Barcelona, 1913 – Barcelona, 27 March 2005) was a Spanish writer of Catalan descent. She wrote poetry and essays, and was considered one of the best chroniclers of the Barcelona neighborhood of "El Putxet". In 1998, she received the Medal of Honor of Barcelona.
