= Maria del Pilar Maspons i Labrós =

Spanish poet, novelist and writer (1841–1907)

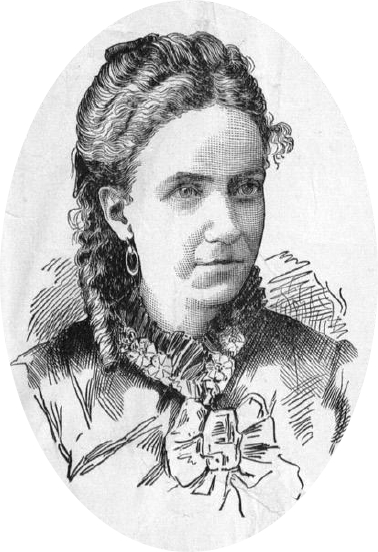
- Maria de Bell-lloch, from the New York Feather magazine of March 1879
- Born: 1841; Barcelona
- Died: 1907 (aged 65–66); Barcelona
- Writing career
- Pen name: Maria de Bell-lloc
- Language: Spanish, Catalan
- Genres: poet, novelist, folklorist

Maria del Pilar Maspons i Labrós (1841 in Barcelona – 1907 Barcelona) was a Spanish poet, novelist and writer of Catalan descent. Writing under the pseudonym Maria de Bell-lloc (sometimes spelled Bell-lloch), that she used her entire career, she is notable as one of the first Spanish women folklorists and the first woman novelist to be published in Catalan.

== Biography ==
Maria de Bell-lloc (in English: Maria of the Beautiful Place) was a writer of the Renaissance Catalan period and was very active from her start in 1865. She was influenced by trends in this movement, which became known for romanticism of medieval characters, patriotism and traditionalism. She was also one of the first folklorist women, conducting field work to collect and transcribe Catalan legends and ethnographic narratives that she later recreated and edited.

Maria wrote about her Catalan heritage and her stories and poems were set in the themes and landscapes of the Vallès region near Barcelona, Spain. It was a place that was very dear to her as the Maspons family owned the manor house at Bigues and often visited there.

Her poetry was published in numerous magazines and Catalan periodicals during her lifetime. Between 1865 and 1882, her writing appeared in such reviews as Calendari Català (Catalan Calendar), Lo Gay Saber, La Renaxensa, La Veu de Montserrat, La Llumanera de Nova York (The New York Feather), La Veu de Catalunya and Il·lustració Catalana. She also published two collections of poems Salabrugas (1874) and Poesies (Poems, undated).

In a presentation of the book Llegendari (Book of Legends), Joan Armangué i Herrero confirmed that Maria was an essential member of the folklorist movement.

She is known for being the first author to publish a novel in contemporary Catalan literature, Vigatans i botiflers (Loyalists and Traitors, published between 1878 and 1879), and set during the War of Spanish Succession (1701-1714). (The war was triggered by the death of the childless monarch Charles II of Spain). Her book describes the deaths of fighters for independence during the war and the loss of Catalan rights.

In May 1879, Maria published two special poems and legends in a special issue of The New York Feather dedicated to Catalan women and created by writer Dolors Monserdà.

On May 13, 1880, the Catalan Excursions Association organized a literary evening in which Maria's Montseny traditions were read. In 1885 Maria was named an honorary member of the Catalan Folklore Section of the Catalan Excursions Association. A few years later, Maria would face the final stage of her production with the publication in The Catalan Illustration of "Four Traditions" (1889) and "Four Other Traditions of the Time of the Recapture" (1894).

Maria Maspons was known to have carried out exhaustive fieldwork of Catalan folklore with her brother, the writer Francisco Maspons y Labrós (in Catalan, his name is Francesc de Sales Maspons i Labrós), and her brother-in-law Francesc Pelai Briz. Together, they set out to gather manifestations of Catalan folk literature. Francesc de Sales collected fables, children's games and traditions, Francesc Pelai concentrated on songs and riddles, and Maria de Bell-lloc gathered legends and traditions.

== Selected works ==
Her works include poems and legends.

- Lloances (Praises) (1866)
- Salabrugas, poesias catalanas (Salabrugas, Catalan Poetry) (1874), featuring a prologue by Joan Sardà
- Narracions y llegendas (Stories and Legends) (1875)
- Vigatans y botiflers, novela histórica (Loyalists and Traitors, historical novel) (1878)
- Montseny (1880), a collection of six legends about this mountain.
- Llegendas catalanas (Catalan legends) (1881)
- Costums i tradicions del Vallès (Customs and traditions of the Vallès) (1882), with a first part dedicated to the description of customs, beliefs and popular festivals, and a second part with 22 legends about places in the Vallès region.
- Elisabeth de Mur (Elizabeth of Mur) (1924), which included more than 70 stories and narratives.
- Poesies (Poems, undated)

== Awards ==
While she did not receive any prizes for her poetry, she did earn several for other writing.

- First accession to the jasmine of silver in Lleida in 1869.
- Special Mention at the Floral Games literary competition of Barcelona in 1875, for Narrations and legends.
- Artistic and Allegorical Jewel award of the Catalan Excursions Association in 1880 for her collection of legends titled Montseny.
- Scientific-Literary Prize of the Granoller's Casino in 1882 for a collection of stories, Costums i tradicions del Vallès (Customs and Traditions of the Vallès).
