= Mònica Terribas i Sala =

Journalist

Mònica Terribas
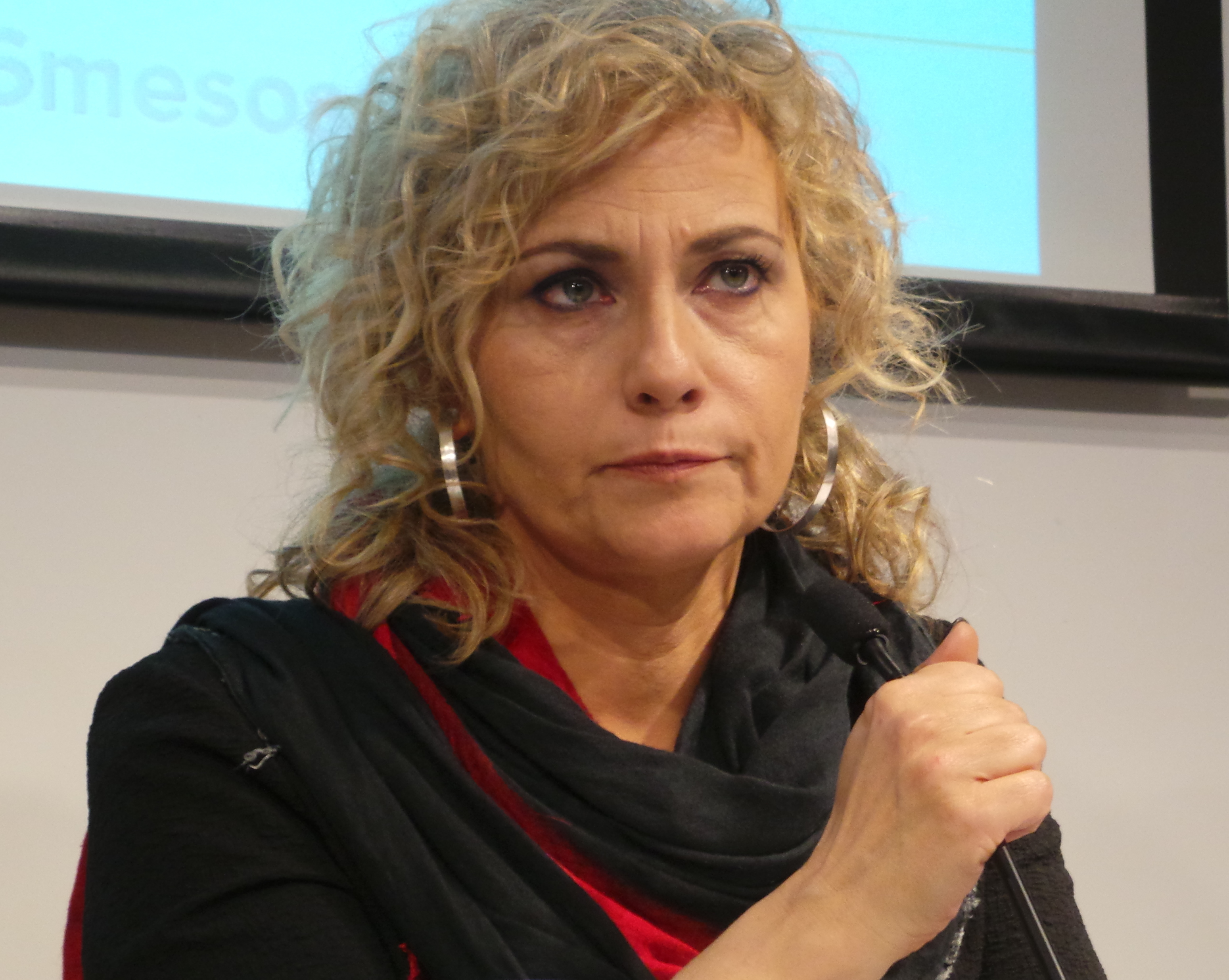
- Mònica Terribas in 2017
- Born: Mònica Terribas i Sala; 1968 (age 57–58); Barcelona, Spain
- Occupation: journalist
- Known for: Former presenter of El matí de Catalunya Ràdio

Mònica Terribas i Sala (born 16 January 1968) is a Catalan journalist, full professor at Pompeu Fabra University. From 2008 to 2012 she was director of Televisió de Catalunya and the following year, editor of the newspaper Ara. From September 2013 to July 2020 she was the host and director of El matí de Catalunya Ràdio. Since February 2022 she has been vice-president of Òmnium Cultural.
