= Luisa Etxenike =

Spanish author

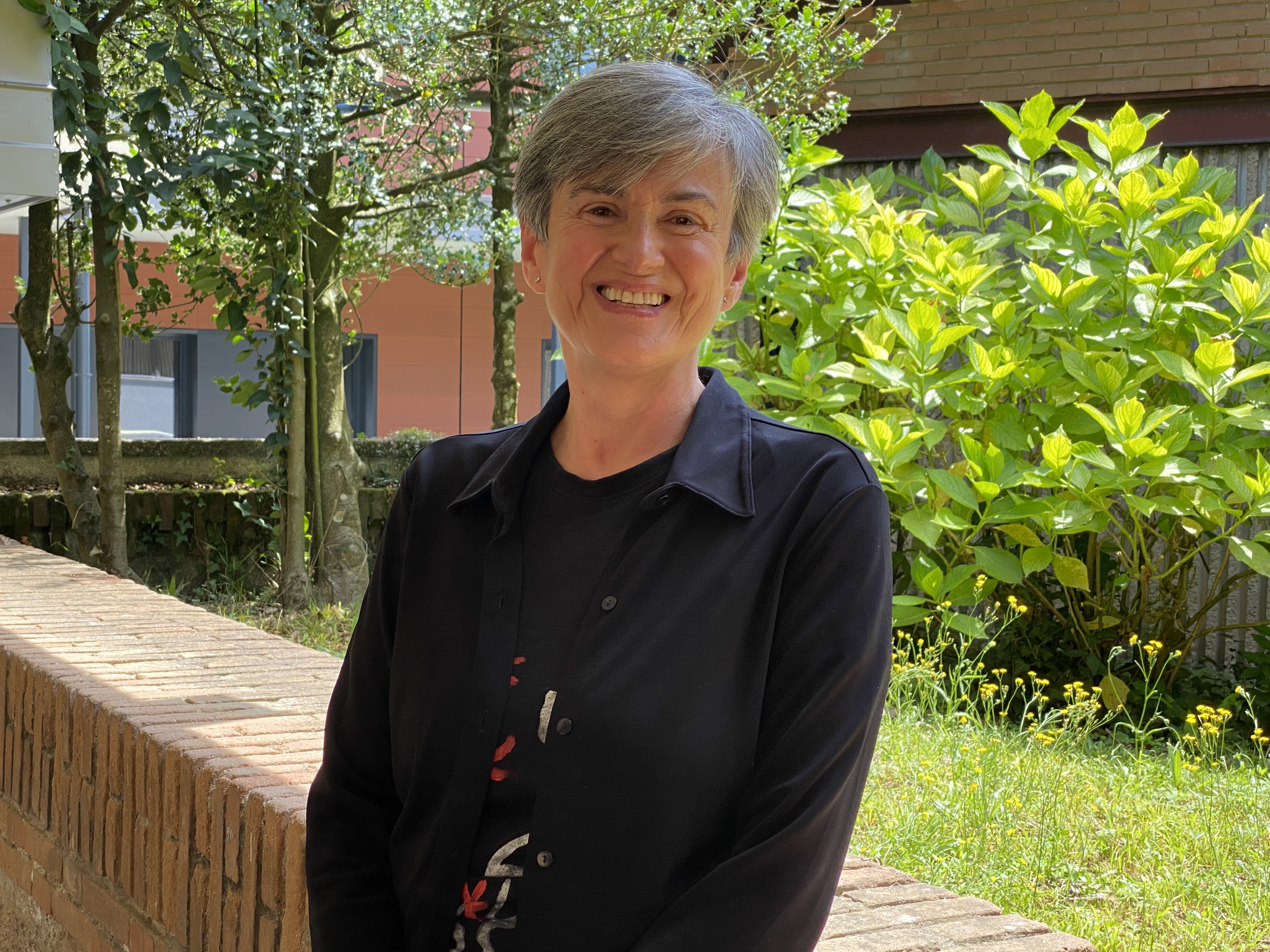
- Etxenike in 2022
- Born: July 10, 1957 (age 69); San Sebastián, Spain
- Occupation: Writer
- Writing career
- Language: Spanish, French and English
- Notable awards: Premio Euskadi de Literatura (2009)

Luisa Etxenike (born 10 July 1957, San Sebastián, Spain) is an author from the Basque Country. She is a recipient of the Premio Euskadi de Literatura and the Medalla al Mérito Ciudadano.

== Biography ==
She has published several novels, short story collections, plays and a poetry collection. She had a weekly column on culture and politics in the Spanish newspaper, El País. Fluent in Spanish, French and English, she has translated the works of several French authors, including the filmmaker Claude Lanzmann

Etxenike organises local writing workshops, and has directed an annual women's literary festival in San Sebastián, Un mundo de escritoras since 1987,(formally known as Encuentro de escritoras), and is the founder and director of the online cultural platform, Canal Europa.

== Awards ==
In 2009, Etxenike received the Basque literary award ''Premio Euskadi de Literatura'' for her novel El ángulo ciego. In 2013, she was awarded the Medalla al Mérito Ciudadano, (Medal for Exemplary Citizenship) from the City of San Sebastián.

== Bibliography ==
=== Novels ===
- Aves del Paraíso (2019)
- Absoluta presencia (2018)
- El detective de sonidos (Libros de Pizarra, 2011) / (Le détective de sons. Naïve Livres Editions, Paris 2014)
- El ángulo ciego (Bruguera, 2009)—Premio Euskadi de literatura
- Los peces negros (Bassarai, 2005)
- Vino (Bassarai, 2003) / (La ravissement de l’été., Robert Laffont Éditions, Paris 2012)
- El mal más grave (Bassarai 1997)
- Efectos secundarios (Bassarai, 1996) / (Effetti Secondari, Edizioni Empirìa, Rome 2000)
- Querida Teresa (La Primitiva Casa Baroja, 1988)
- Silvero Girón y otros cuentos (La Primitiva Casa Baroja, 1982)—Premio Juan Antonio Zunzunegui

=== Plays ===
- Gernika es ahora (Radio theatre, Cadena Ser, 2017)
- La herencia (Ayuntamiento de Guadalajara, 2016)—Premio de Teatro Antonio Buero Vallejo
- La entrevista (co-author physicist Gustavo Ariel Schwartz. El Gallo de Oro, 2015)

=== Poetry ===
- El arte de la pesca (El Gallo de oro, 2015)

=== Non-fiction ===
- Correspondencia con Mircea Cartarescu (Ediciones Erein, 2016)

=== Short stories collections ===
- Ejercicios de duelo (Bassarai, 2001)
- La historia de amor de Margarita Maura (La Primitiva Casa Baroja, 1989)

=== Book translations ===
- Alguien vivo pasa, Claude Lanzmann (Arena Libros, 2005)
- La cabeza de Paul Verlaine, Jean-Michel Maulpoix (Bassarai, 2004)
- Algo negro, Jacques Roubaud (Bassarai, 2001)
- Después de los campos, la vida, Virginie Linhart (Film documentary, 2013)

=== Newspaper columns ===
- El País, weekly column on culture and politics (2002 – 2012)—Premio Emakunde a la Igualdad, 2004
- El Mundo, weekly column on culture and politics (1996 – 2000)—Premio Emakunde de Comunicación, 1998
