= Nazareth Castellanos =

Spanish physicist, neuroscientist and science communicator (born 1977)

- Born: Pilar Nazareth Perales Castellanos; 1977 (age 48–49); Madrid, Spain
- Education: Autonomous University of Madrid
- Occupations: Physicist; neuroscientist; science communicator

Pilar Nazareth Perales Castellanos (born 1977), known professionally as Nazareth Castellanos, is a Spanish physicist, neuroscientist and science communicator. Her research examines meditation and the interaction between the brain and other organs; she directs research at the Nirakara laboratory and holds the extraordinary chair of Mindfulness and Cognitive Sciences at the Complutense University of Madrid.

Her books include El puente donde habitan las mariposas (2025). In 2026 she and Antonio Basanta published Un regalo de los dioses, a book about the neuroscience of reading.

== Early life and education ==
Castellanos was born in Madrid in 1977. Her full name is Pilar Nazareth Perales Castellanos; in 2002 she chose to sign her first scientific paper, a computational model of the propagation of epileptic activity, as Nazareth Castellanos, a professional name formed from her second surname rather than her first.

She graduated in theoretical physics from the Autonomous University of Madrid (UAM) in 2002 and obtained a doctorate in medicine from the same university in 2008. Her doctoral thesis was titled Estudio y aplicación de métodos matemáticos para determinar la conectividad funcional entre series temporales de origen neurofisiológico (Study and Application of Mathematical Methods to Determine Functional Connectivity between Time Series of Neurophysiological Origin). She also completed master's degrees in computational neuroscience and in anatomy, histology and neuroscience.

== Research career ==
Her early career included research and teaching posts at the Department of Medical Physics of Hospital Clínico San Carlos, the Faculty of Biological Sciences at the Complutense University of Madrid and the Cognitive and Computational Neuroscience Laboratory at the Centre for Biomedical Technology; she also worked at the Max Planck Institute for Brain Research in Frankfurt and the Institute of Psychiatry at King's College London, and used mathematical methods to study brain networks and their reorganization in patients with brain injury or Alzheimer's disease. She told El País that her interest in practical research into brain-body interaction began at King's College London while she was working on childhood brain injury and its after-effects; she later left that project and returned to Spain to begin a new project at the Complutense University.

By October 2022, Castellanos was director of research at Nirakara and held the extraordinary chair of Mindfulness and Cognitive Sciences at the Complutense University of Madrid. Her research examines meditation and the influence of the intestines, breathing, heart and posture on brain dynamics.

== Books ==
El espejo del cerebro was published by La Huerta Grande in 2021. Neurociencia del cuerpo. Cómo el organismo esculpe el cerebro followed in 2022. The book links memory, attention, mood and emotions to posture, facial gestures, gut microbiota, heart rhythms and breathing, and places scientific findings alongside the history of medicine in East and West.

Her three Alicia children's books are Alicia y el cerebro maravilloso (2022), Alicia y la barriga maravillosa (2022) and Alicia y el corazón maravilloso (2023). The first, illustrated by Luna Lag, is aimed at children over four; it follows Alicia and Cajal the rabbit through an introduction to brain structures and closes with an attention-control exercise.

El puente donde habitan las mariposas was published by Siruela in 2025. It draws on Santiago Ramón y Cajal and Martin Heidegger's essay Building Dwelling Thinking, and includes a fictional reworking of correspondence between Heidegger and Hannah Arendt to discuss breathing and meditation. In March 2026 she and Joaquín de Luz published El cerebro en danza. Movimiento Cuerpo Mente. Later in 2026 she and philologist Antonio Basanta published Un regalo de los dioses. Neurociencia de la lectura, a conversation about how reading changes the brain, sustains attention and affects mental health.
