= Palmira Jaquetti i Isant =

Spanish foklorist and poet (1895–1963)

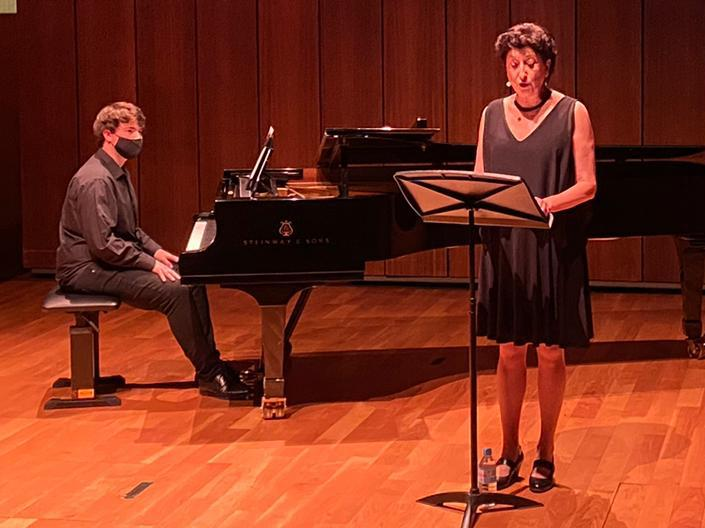
Palmira Jaquetti i Isant

Palmira Jaquetti i Isant (1895–1963) was a Catalan folklorist, poet, businesswoman, composer, musicologist, ethnologist and writer.

== Biography ==
Jaquetti was born in 1895 in Barcelona. After completing her Bachelor of Arts, she taught music and French literature at a high school. Her volume of poetry, La estrella dentro del hogar (The Star Within the Home) (1938), written during the Spanish Civil War reflected a marked sensitivity and musical stylization. She also published song booklets Between 1925 and 1940, she carried out missions to collect popular songs for the Obra del Cançoner Popular de Catalunya (Work of the popular songbook of Catalonia). Jaquetti was one of the most important collectors of these songs worldwide. The sheer number of songs collected in her field work with d'Aoust, María Carbó Soler and Mercè Porta Pino is considered to be a pillar in the field. Jaquetti continued with this worke on her own even after the project was disbanded during the Civil War. In the postwar period, she continued her occupation as a French teacher until the traffic accident in which she died in 1963 in Santa Margarida i els Monjos.

== Death and legacy ==
In 1927, she married the Belgian painter, Enrique Daoust, but the marriage ended in 1934. Her work is documented in a collection at the National Library of Catalonia.

== Selected works ==
- Obra del Cançoner Popular de Catalunya, materials volum VII. Memòries de missions de recerca per Plamira Jaquetti, Baltasar Samper, Ramón Morey, Enric d’Aoust. A cura de Josep Massot i Muntaner (1937)
- Cançons de caramelles per a cor d’homes, quartet vocal o cor mixte a dues, tres o quatre veus. Edició (1953)
- Mis canciones navideñas Edició (1943)
- Selección de canciones navideñas originales y populares (1954–55)
- Trenta cançons nadalenques per a cant i piano (1952)
- Poema de Santa Llúcia Edició (1961)
