= Laura Tremosa =

Spanish industrial engineer and feminist

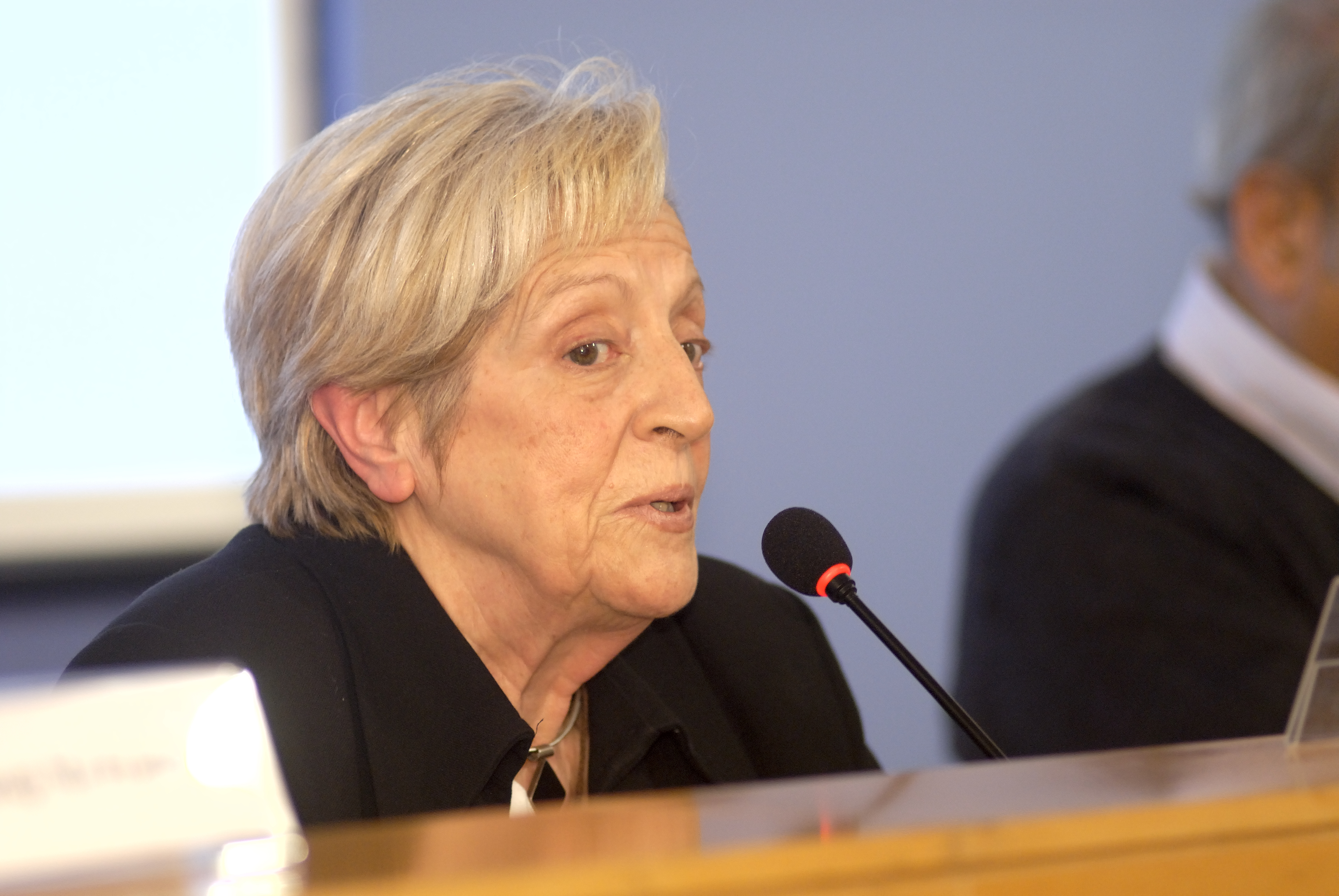
Laura Tremosa

Laura Tremosa Bonavia (born 1937, Espolla, Catalonia) is a Spanish industrial engineer and feminist. She studied mechanical engineering at the Polytechnic University of Catalonia in Barcelona, and earned her doctorate in the same field at the UPC in 1964. She was the first Catalan woman, and the second Spanish woman who qualified in industrial engineering.

== Selected works ==
- La robòtica a la indústria catalana (1989)
- La Mujer ante el desafío tecnológico (1986) ISBN 978-84-7426-119-6.
