= Isabel Pérez Montalbán =

Spanish poet (born 1964)

Isabel Pérez Montalbán (born 1964 in Córdoba, Andalusia) is a Spanish poet. She's a member of the so-called Conscience poetry group.

She studied to be a teacher and also learnt media studies. She currently lives in Málaga, and has taken part in several literature festivals like the Week of Poetry of Barcelona in 2007.

== Awards and prizes ==
- Prize Young Literature of City of Málaga, 1992 (No es precisa la muerte)
- Prize Barcarola, 1995 (Puente levadizo)
- Prize Leonor, 2000 (Los muertos nómadas)

== Poetry books ==
- No es precisa la muerte (Málaga, 1992).
- Pueblo nómada (Málaga, 1995).
- Fuegos japoneses en la bahía (Málaga, 1996)
- Puente levadizo (Albacete, 1996)
- Cartas de amor de un comunista (Valencia, 2000)
- Los muertos nómadas (Soria, 2001)
- De la nieve embrionaria (Montilla, 2002).
- El frío proletario (Málaga, 2002).
- Siberia propia (Madrid, 2007)
