= Isabel Vericat =

Spanish-Mexican lawyer and writer

Isabel Vericat Núñez (born c. 1970) is a Spanish-Mexican lawyer, book writer and translator of many languages.

== Biography ==
Isabel Vericat Núñez was born in Spain. She studied law at the University of Madrid (disambiguation). During 1999, she worked as a lawyer in New York City. She speaks Spanish, English, French, Italian and Portuguese.

Vericat Núñez is the founding member of Epikeia, an organization dedicated to women's rights. She is also a member of the Writer's Dynamic School, and she has written many books for the Mexico College and the UNAM.

Her work focuses on the experiences of women migrating within Central America, particularly along the border between Guatemala and Mexico. Vericat Núñez is known for her involvement in the movement against killings of women in Ciudad Juarez. She wrote De Este Lado de la Puente/From this Side of the Bridge, a book about Maria Elena Chavez Caldera, a teenaged victim of femicide in Ciudad Juarez.
