= Teresa Espasa =

Spanish poet and essayist

María Teresa Espasa
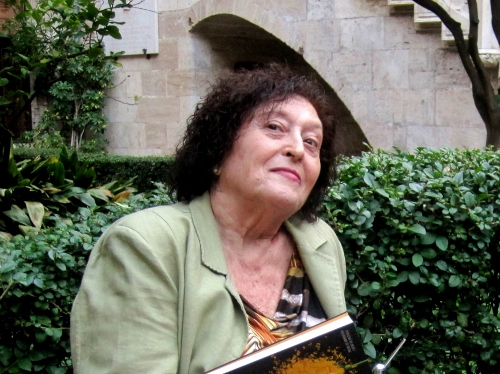
- Born: María Teresa Espasa Moltó; Dénia, Marina Alta, Alicante, Spain
- Occupations: Poet, essayist, professor
- Writing career
- Notable works: El bazar de los insomnios, Cuando puedas llama, Tanto y tanto silencio
- Notable awards: Premio Vila de Mislata (1999); XI Premio de Poesía Leonor de Córdoba (2012); CLAVE Award for poetic career (2015)

María Teresa Espasa Moltó is a Spanish Valencian poet, essayist and professor. She was born in Dénia, Marina Alta, Alicante) in the middle of the 20th century. She is known for her intense and animated literary and cultural style developed during the talk show "La Buhardilla" and through the magazine, Corondel.

== Selected works ==
- A través del silencio (Adelapos, 1978)
- Ensueño poético a cuatro voces (I.B. El Clot, Valencia, 1988)
- Desierto articulado (La Buhardilla, 1992)
- El bazar de los insomnios (Germania, 1994)
- El gesto habitual de la torpeza (Canente Libros, 1997)
- De la ilusión del amor a la pérdida del tiempo (Páginacero, 1998)
- El tiempo se acaba (Páginacero, 1998), escrito en colaboración con Elena Torres.
- El ocio de la gaviota (Páginacero, 1999)
- Cuando puedas llama (Premio Vila de Mislata, 1999)
- Aquellos días perdidos (Páginacero, 2002)
- En el nombre de cada día (Aristas de Cobre, 2005)
- Poemas de Nueva York (Corondel, 2005)
- Diario de sombras (Brosquil, 2006)
- Poemas dispersos (Páginacero, 2009)
- Tiempo para el recuerdo (Biblioteca Valenciana, Generalitat Valenciana, 2011)
- El congreso (Andrómina, 2012)
- Tanto y tanto silencio. Antología poética (Ediciones Vitrubio, 2014)

== Inclusion in anthologies ==
- Las flores idílicas (Málaga, 1998)
- Partida de Damas (Museo de Bellas Artes, Valencia, 1999)
- Antología Grupo Poético Corondel (Corona del Sur, Málaga, 2000)
- Las flores del yodo (Generalidad Valenciana, 2001)
- El rapto de Europa (Fundación Max Aub, 2004)
- Caminos de la palabra. De Max Aub al Quijote (Fundación Max Aub, 2005)
- Final de entrega (Córdoba 2006)
- Mapa. 30 Poetas valencianos en la democracia (Carena, 2009)
- Celebración de la palabra (Institució Alfons el Magnànim, 2010)
- Trato Preferente. Voces esenciales de la poesía actual en español (Sial, 2010)
- Latidos contra la violencia de género (Ed. Ateneo Blasco Ibáñez, 2012)
- Los que no tienen voz dentro de El limonero de Homero III (Páginacero, 2013)
- Poética en Gredos (Alkaid, 2013).

== Awards ==
- Premio Vila de Mislata (1999): Cuando puedas llama
- XI Premio de Poesía Leonor de Córdoba (2012): El congreso
- Premio de la Asociación Valenciana de Escritores y Críticos Literarios (CLAVE) a la trayectoria poética (2015)

== Bibliography ==
- Espasa, María Teresa (2014). Tanto y tanto silencio: antología poética (in Spanish). Vitruvio. ISBN 978-84-942353-2-0.
