= Victòria Peña i Nicolau =

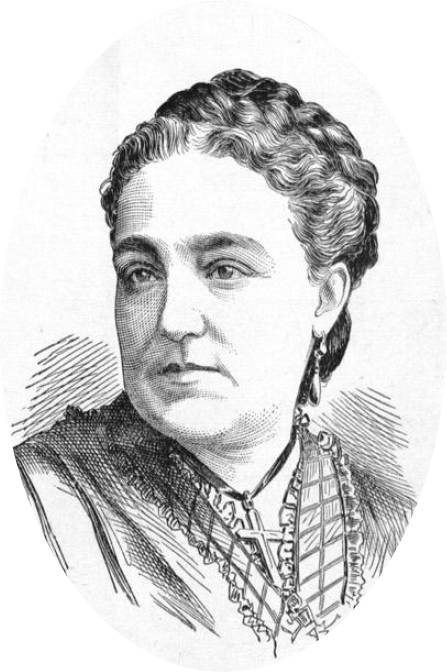
- Victòria Peña i Nicolau
- Born: March 23, 1827; Palma, Balearic Islands; Spain
- Died: 1898; Barcelona, Catalonia; Spain
- Occupation: Writer
- Spouse: Miquel Victorià Amer
- Writing career
- Pen name: Victoria Peña de Amer
- Language: Catalan

Victòria Peña i Nicolau (28 March 1827 in Palma – Barcelona, 1898) also known as Victoria Peña de Amer, was a Mallorcan poet, sister of Pere de Alcàntara Peña i Nicolau, married to the poet Miquel Victorià Amer.

== Biography ==
During her youth, she studied religious writers like Saint Teresa de Jesus, Fray Luis de Leon and Fray Luis de Granada. When she was about twenty years old, she published in the newspapers of Palma her first compositions written in Spanish, and in 1855 she gave to the stamp a chosen collection of religious rhymes. She then began writing with a group that published the magazine El Plantel, where she met Miquel Amer, with whom she would marry and move to Barcelona in 1859, since the husband was named administrator of the Northern Railway. She had his support, although she expressed in her poetry the sadness caused by the death of her younger children.

Amer's participation in the foundation and maintenance of the Barcelona Floral Games facilitated Victoria's participation in poetic contests. She obtained an award in 1859 with "Anyorança" ("Yearning") and was still awarded several times: 1865 for "Amor de mare" ("Motherly love"), 1873 for "Una visita a ma pàtria" ("A visit to my homeland"), 1880 for "Joventut perduda" ("Lost youth") and 1883 for "Lo meu niu" ("My nest"). The great participation of Victoria Peña in numerous contests provoked even the criticisms of people like for example Miquel dels Sants Oliver. Francesc Matheu collected much of her poetry in 1909, after the writer died, in a book published in Barcelona, "Poesies de Victòria Penya d'Amer" ("Poems by Victòria Penya d'Amer"). She died in Barcelona in 1898.
