= Narcisa Pérez Reoyo =

Spanish writer

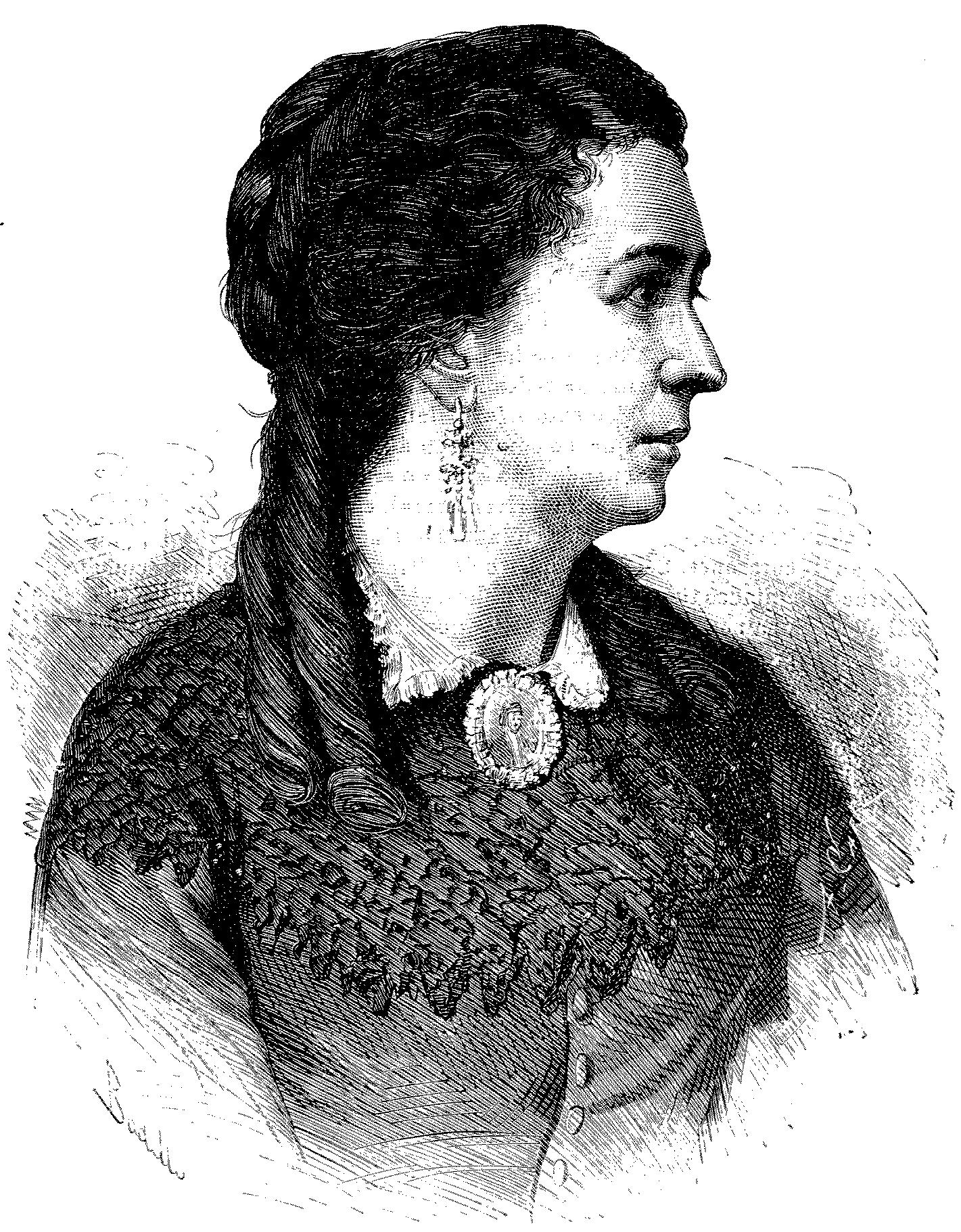
Narcisa Pérez Reoyo

Narcisa Pérez Reoyo (May 4, 1849 - June 19, 1876) was a 19th-century Spanish writer of Galicia. Her works included, Cantos de la infancia (1865), Devocionario infantil (1867), and Horas perdidas (1874)

== Biography ==
Narcisa Pérez Reoyo was born in Santiago de Compostela, May 4, 1849. Her father was Narciso Pérez Reoyo.

She entered the Academia Bibliográfico-Mariana de Lérida in 1872 and obtained in that same year a second prize for an ode to Our Lady of Guadalupe; In the following two years, she was awarded additional prizes at the same academy.

She was the author of titles such as Cantos de la infancia (1865), Devocionario infantil (1867), and Horas perdidas (1874).

She married Nicolás Boado. Narcisa Pérez Reoyo died on June 19, 1876 in A Coruña.
