= Maria Dolors Alibés =

Catalan children's writer (1941–2009)

- in 1989
- Born: Maria Dolors Alibés i Riera; 2 January 1941
- Died: 8 November 2009 (aged 68)
- Writing career
- Language: Catalan
- Notable awards: Prize Cavall Fort de contes

María Dolores Alibés i Riera (2 January 1941 Vidrà, Osona - 8 November 2009 Sant Pau, Ripollès) was a Catalan author of children's books. She was the sister of sports journalist Arcadi Alibés, and was emotionally involved with cartoonist Juan López Fernández, "Jan".

== Career ==
Alibés i Riera was a regular contributor to media outlets (Avui, Cavall Fort, Tretzevents, Regió 7, El 9 Nou, Catalunya Ràdio, Ràdio Olot), and a children's author. She wrote forty books for children, including novels and story books. Some of these books were translated into Basque, Spanish, Aranese, Galician and French. She penned How to Make a Comic Book (1989), with Jan. She was a historian and teacher. Riera remained active, writing books even in 2009, the year she died, since two of her books, Superfantasmas in a Supermarket' (Bruño) and 'Grillo Gherkin' ('Grill cordill' in Catalan, both with Bruño) were published that year.

== Awards ==
- Freya, 1981 :
- Prize Cavall Fort de contes, 1983, for Contestadors automaàtics
- Fundació d'Amics de les Arts i les Lletres de Sabadell, 1984, for On podria pondre un ou?
- National Library of Munich, 1983, Tasme the ghost

== Works ==
- Buscando un nombre, La Galera, 1979 (Searching for a name, 1979)
- Tasma el fantasma, Teide, 1983 (Tasme, the ghost, 1985)
- Contestadors automàtics, premio Cavall Fort de cuentos de las Fiestas Populares de Cultura Pompeu Fabra, 1983
- Máquinas de empaquetar humo y otros inventos, La Galera, 1984 (Smoke Packing Machines and Other Engines)
- Vamos a contar ratones, La Galera, 1986 (Let's count mice)
- Un botón llorón, La Galera, 1987 (A weeping button)
- El planeta Mo, Crüilla, 1988
- Superfantasmas en un supermercado, Bruño, 1993 (Superfantasmas in a supermarket)
- El planeta de cristal, El Arca de Junior, 1994 (The Crystal Planet)
- Niebla en los bolsillos, La Galera, 1998 (Fog in the pockets)
- Grillo Pepinillo, Bruño, 2003 (Grill Cordill, 1996 )
