= María de Echarri =

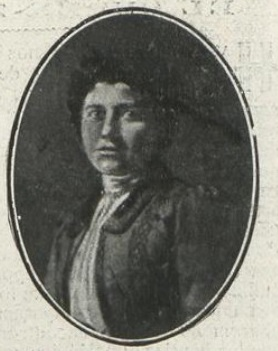
- Portrait published in 1917

Madrid municipal councillor

Member of the National Assembly
- In office 15 October 1927 – 10 February 1930

Personal details
- Born: 9 September 1878; San Lorenzo de El Escorial
- Died: 1955; San Sebastián

María de Echarri y Martínez (9 September 1878 – 1955) was a Spanish catholic propagandist and columnist, advocate of feminist causes.

== Biography ==
Born 9 September 1878 in San Lorenzo de El Escorial, she was teacher by profession. She was a publicist associated to the "Acción Católica de la Mujer", in addition to being an advocate of the working woman from a Catholic perspective. She became one of the first female city councillors of Madrid in 1924. In 1927 she became one of the 13 women represented in the National Assembly of the dictatorship of Primo de Rivera, in office from 10 October 1927 to 15 February 1930. She died in San Sebastián in 1955.

She was a recipient of the Pro Ecclesia et Pontifice medal.
