= Maria Verger =

Spanish archivist, librarian, and poet

Maria Verger Ventayol (1892–1983) was a Spanish archivist, librarian, and poet in Catalan and Spanish.

== Biography ==
Born in Alcúdia in 1892, Maria Verger trained as a librarian and archivist at the Barcelona School of Librarians. From 1921 to 1934 she corresponded with Maria Antònia Salvà, who agreed to direct her in her beginnings in poetry, and wrote the preface of her first book. In her Catalan poetry she followed an aesthetic related to the Mallorcan School.

In 1923 she was named curator of the Museo Joan Soler y Palet in Terrassa, and until 1943 resided in that city, where she also took charge of the library and municipal archive. She created the library of the School of Home Economics and that of the judicial prison. She also led an effort of intensive outreach and recovery of the documentary heritage of Terrassa through the pages of the Majorcan newspaper El Día. During this period she wrote an Inventory of the Municipal Archive of Terrassa (Catalan: Inventari de l'Arxiu Municipal de Terrassa) for which she received an award at the competition of archivists of the Institut d'Estudis Catalans in 1935. In 1942 an extract was published with the title Reseña histórica de los archivos y bibliotecas del ayuntamiento de Tarrasa.

Verger corresponded with Francesc de B. Moll, collaborating on the Diccionari català valencià balear.

She lived for some years in South America, and after her return to Spain settled in Madrid, where she developed her poetry in Spanish. She died there in 1983.

== Works ==
=== Catalan poetry ===
- Clarors matinals, preface by Maria Antònia Salvà (Imp. Casa de Caritat, Barcelona, 1924)
- Tendal d'estrelles, preface by Josep Maria de Sagarra (Ed. Políglota, Barcelona, 1930)
- L'estela d'or (Imp. Mossèn Alcover, Majorca, 1934)

=== Spanish poetry ===
- Rutas maravillosas (1966)
- Por la senda de las rosas (1976)

=== Catalan narrative ===
- L'esflorament d'una il·lusió (Sóller, 1930)
