= Mercedes Odina =

Spanish journalist, author, film director and culture manager (born 1959)

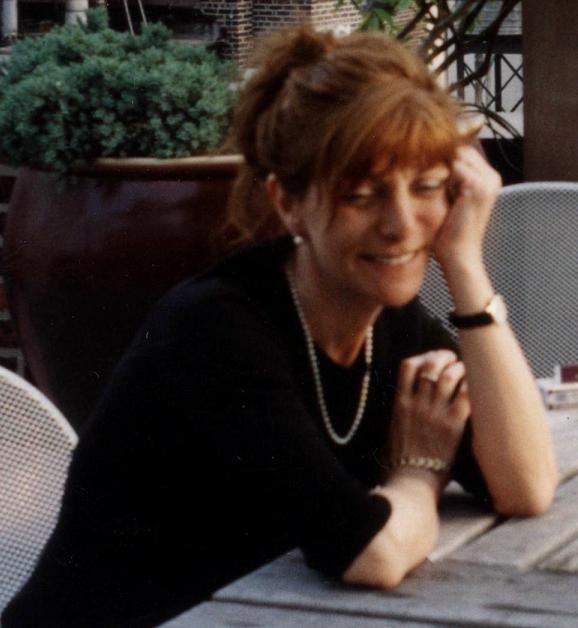
- Odina in 2009
- Born: 11 October 1959 (age 67); Barcelona, Spain
- Occupations: journalist, author, film director, cultural manager
- Writing career
- Subjects: Culture and international relations

Mercedes Odina (born 11 October 1959) is a Spanish journalist, author, film director and cultural manager.

== Career in journalism ==
Mercedes Odina has a Bachelor of Arts degree in Communication from the Autonomous University of Barcelona. She began her career at Radio Miramar and in 1985 she joined the News Services of Televisión Española (TVE). Shortly after, she became part of the team of editors of Informe Semanal. In 1989, she began her first film project as an author, director and screenwriter of the documentary series of ten one-hour chapters Los años vividos (The Years We Lived)- a complete review of the 20th century in Spain based on the memory of 250 most outstanding Spanish personalities. The program was awarded with the Premios Ondas Internacional de Television in 1992.

In 1991, she was appointed director of investigative journalism program Dossier 21 in TVE. This series consisted of ten research documentaries with topics related to current events and the recent past. Some of the documentaries produced during this period, such as Objective: Kill Franco were broadcast by various foreign television channels and were exhibited in international festivals. In 1995, she moved to New York as a foreign correspondent for TVE.

In 1997, she published her first book, America Sociedad Anonima, and until 2005 she combined work as a professor of Communication at the University Ramon Llull in Barcelona with writing and collaboration with several radio, television channels and newspapers. In April 2005, she was appointed Head of the Department of Communication, Marketing and Promotion of Expo 2008. From 2008 to 2009, she was the Head of Culture at Canning House, the Hispanic and Luso Brazilian Council in London.

== Books ==
- March 1997. AMERICA SOCIEDAD ANÓNIMA, Planeta: Documented exposition of the different aspects (socially, economically and politically) that make up the picture of the United States at present. ISBN 84-08-01984-8
- March 1998. EL FACTOR FAMA, Anagrama: Analysis of the transformation of the concept and value of Fame after the emergence of audiovisual mass media. ISBN 84-339-0563-5
- March 2000. LA ALDEA IRREAL, El País Aguilar: The book presents an analysis of the development and impact of the new scientific and technological revolution currently developing in the world.. ISBN 84-03-59615-4
- March 2005. EUROPA VERSUS USA, Espasa Calpe: The book offers a reflection on the concept of the Western Civilization, and an analysis of the different concepts that unites and separates the United States and the European Union. ISBN 84-670-1704-X

== Filmography ==
- October 1992. Los años vividos (The years we lived), director and script writer, RTVE Madrid, Spain. Premios Ondas International Television Award.
- September 2004. New York, New York: the great city of the world, director and script writer, PBS USA / Sagrera TV productions.

== Awards ==
- October 1992. Ondas International Television Award for the series Los años vividos (The years we lived)
- March 1998. Finalist XXVI Edition of the Anagrama Award of Essay for the book El Factor Fama (The Fame Factor)
