= Valentina Pinelo =

Spanish poet and writer

Valentina Pinelo was a Spanish poet and writer at the beginning of the 17th century during the Spanish Golden Age of politics and culture.

Born into a wealthy Genovese family, at age 4 years she was sent to a convent at San Leandro in Seville to become a nun. She was in contact with certain intellectuals of the era, including the celebrated playwright Lope de Vega, who dedicated several laudatory poems to her.

She wrote Libro de las alabanzas y excelencias de la gloriosa Santa Ana published by Clemente Hidalgo in 1601. This work is studied by researchers of Mariology.

A street in Seville is named in Valentina Pinelo's honour.

== See also ==
- Spanish Baroque literature
