= Rosa María Cid López =

Spanish academic

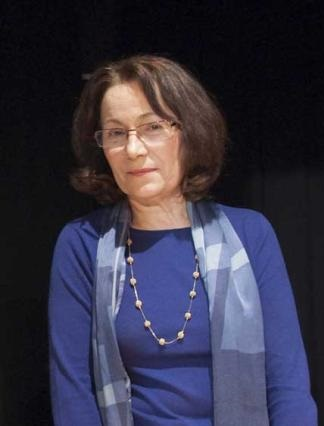
Rosa María Cid López

Rosa María Cid López (born, 29 January 1956) is a Spanish academic. Specializing in the study of women and gender, she served as President of the Asociación Española de Investigación de Historia de las Mujeres (Spanish Association Investigating the History of Women).

== Early years ==
Cid López was born in 1956. In 1979, she received a license in Philosophy and Letters (Section of History) in the University of Oviedo. In 1986, she defended her thesis, "The cult to the emperor in Numidia of Diocletian". She earned a PhD in Geography and History at the University of Oviedo.

== Career ==
She serves as Professor of Ancient History in the University of Oviedo and has been the chair since 2011. She coordinates the Deméter Group, and the Motherhood, Gender and Family department at the same university.

Cid López's research focuses on motherhood and mothers in Ancient Mediterranean civilizations. She is also a specialist in the history of the women, and of gender in ancient societies, with attention to the subjects of historiography, power, religion and construction of feminine stereotypes through the biographies of Livia and Cleopatra.

While a professor at the University of Oviedo, she has been interested in the study of the history of Asturias in antiquity, participating in excavations of Gijón in 1983 and Lugo of Llanera in 1983–1989. She coordinated the corresponding publication in the History of Asturias, published by La Nueva España in 1990–91. Cid López was a member of the Committee that designed the Permanent Exhibition of the Archaeological Museum of Asturias (2008–2011), prior to its inauguration.

Cid López has participated in four archaeologic excavations (regional and national) and was co-director of the excavations in Lugo of Llanera (Asturias) in the period of 1987 to 1989. She is the author and editor of multiple publications and scientific documents in diverse magazines and books, including the Spanish translation of the work of Françoise Thébaud "Escribir la historia de las mujeres y del género" ("Writing the history of women and gender"). From 1981, she has been a speaker at numerous congresses, seminars and academic meetings, national and international, in addition to forming part of the organizational committees or scientists.

Cid López was President of Spanish Association of Historical Investigation of Women (AEIHM) April 2002 through April 2004. She served as vice-president of the University Association of Studies of Women (AUDEM) April 1999 to May 2001. She is a member of, European Network on Gender Studies on Antiquity (EuGeStA), Arys Associations, Social History, Association; Council Adviser of the magazines Genre et Histoire; and a member of the Scientific Committee of the electronic magazines, The future of the past and Magazine (AUDEM).

== Publications ==
- 2013 - Horas de radio sobre mujeres e Historia, Trabe.
- 2013 - Debita Verba. Estudios en homenaje al profesor Julio Mangas (co-editor with Estela García Fernández).
- 2012 - La maternité à l´epreuve du genre. Metamorphoses et permanences de la méditerranéenne maternité dans l´aire méditerranéenne.(codirectora junto a Y. Knibiehler y Francesca Arena). Presses de l´Ecole des Hautes Etudes de Santé Publique.
- 2010 - Mujeres en la Historia, Ambitu.
- 2010 - Maternidad/es: representaciones y realidad social. Edades Antigua y Medieval, Almudayna, Col. Laya.
- 2009 - Madres y maternidades. Construcciones culturales en la civilización clásica, KRK.
- 2003 - Mitos femeninos de la cultura clásica. Creaciones y recreaciones en la historia y la literatura. KRK (coed. Junto a Marta González González).
