= Clara Corral Aller =

Spanish Galician poet, writer

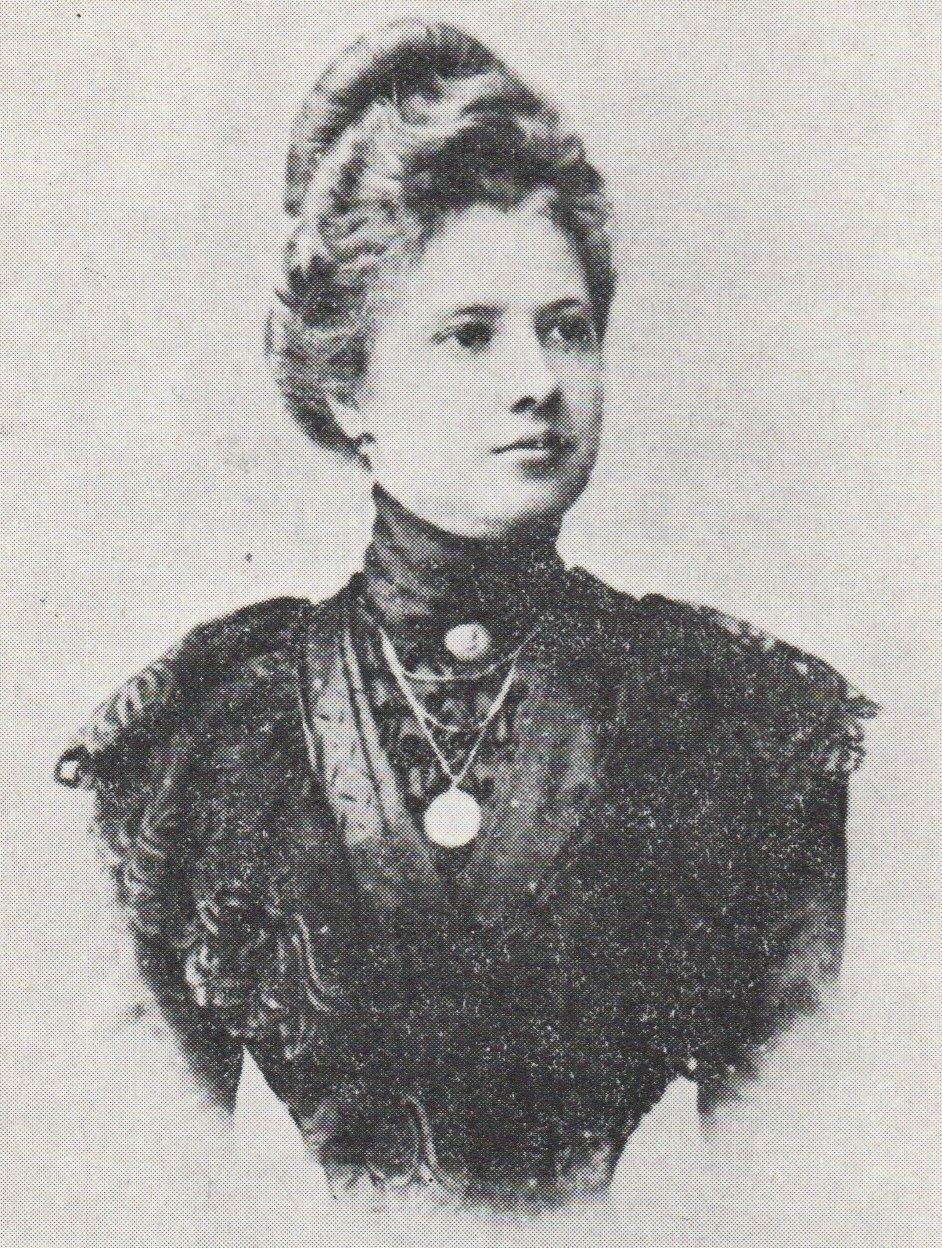
- Born: 8 June 1847 Ourense, Galicia, Spain
- Died: 9 February 1908 (aged 60) A Coruña
- Occupation: Poet and author
- Language: Galician; Spanish
- Citizenship: Spanish

Clara Corral Aller (Ourense, 8 June 1847 - A Coruña, 9 February 1908) was a Galician poet, the second woman to publish a text in Galician language during the 19th century, after Rosalía de Castro. Daughter of Dimas Corral Rebellón and Clara Aller Presas, in 1852 she moved with her family to Lugo. Orphaned by her father and mother, she moved with her sisters Consuelo and Rita to Santiago de Compostela in 1868 and devoted herself to her literary work. Their poems appeared in the press of the time, El Diario de Santiago, Revista Compostelana de Instrucción y Recreo and La Ilustración Gallega y Asturiana. In 1884 she moved to A Coruña with her brother and sister-in-law. In 1891, she published “A Herminia”, dedicated to her orphaned niece, daughter of her sister Rita, who was, like her, a corresponding member of the Royal Galician Academy, created in 1906. In 1980 was published Poesias en gallego y castellano. Clara Corral Aller 1847-1908, collection by Dimas Romero Vázquez. In Ourense, her hometown, there is a street with her name and surname in her honor.

== Bibliography ==
- Romero Vazquez, Dimas (1980). Clara Corral Aller 1847-1908. Poesias en gallego y castellano. A Coruña. ISBN 84-85319-21-4.
