= Encarna Sant-Celoni i Verger =

Spanish narrative writer, poet and translator

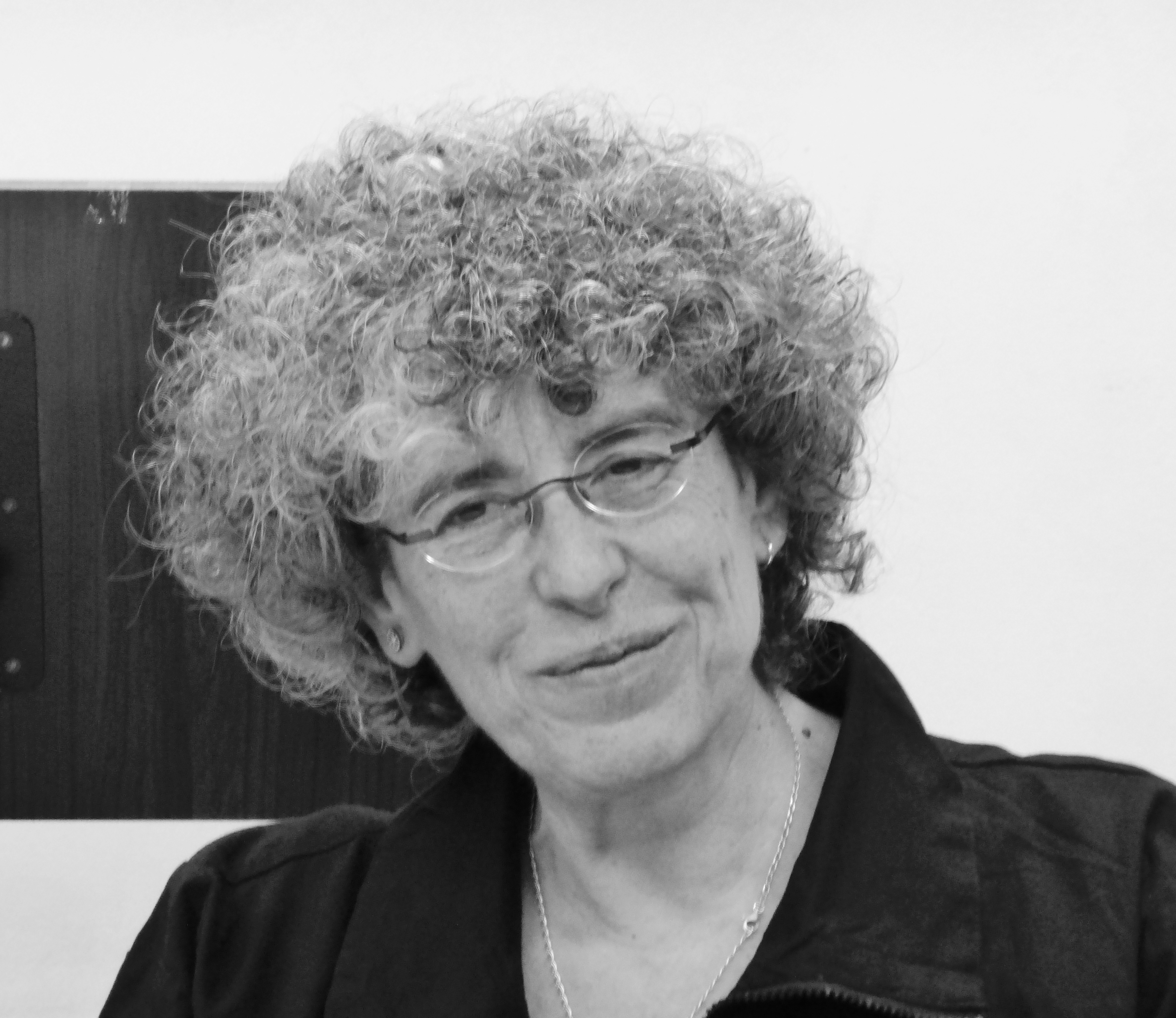
Encarna Sant-Celoni i Verger

Encarna Sant-Celoni i Verger (Tavernes de la Valldigna, La Safor, 1959) is a Spanish narrative writer, poet and translator. In 1983, she won the Ciutat de Cullera prize, with Dotze contes i una nota necrològica, and in 1985 she obtained the prestigious Premi Joanot Martorell de Gandia, with her novel Siamangorina. She is a member of AELC and has translated, among other works, Els mil i un quarts d'hora, by Thomas-Simon Gueullette (Editorial Moll, 2008), and Ifis i Iante, d'Isaac de Benserade (Martorell: adesiara, 2024), and has co-translated from Danish the anthology Digte-POEMES, by Tove Ditlevsen (Alfons el Magnànim, 1995), together with Anne Marie Dinesen. And from Arabic she has translated all the cassidas in existence today of the poets of Al Andalus in the work Perles de la nit. Poetes andalusines, together with Margarida Castells (Adesiara Editorial, 2013).

In 2004, she was awarded the Vila de Puçol prize and in 2008 she published the anthology Eròtiques i despentinades. Un recorregut de cent anys per la poesia catalana amb veu de dona, with artwork by Maria Montes (Arola Editors). She is also co-author of two language texts, Reciclatge (1992) and Accent greu (2000). She has also collaborated with various magazines, journals and publications as well as taking part in several collective acts of homage and new books concerned with poetry in particular.

== Works ==
Novel

- Siamangorina. Ajuntament de Gandia. Gandia, 1986
- Al cor, la quimereta. Tabarca llibres. València, 2003 i 2009
- Milonga de tardor. Òmicron. Badalona, 2014

Poetry

- Sénia de petits vicis. La Forest d'Arana. València, 1989
- Arran de pantomima. Amós Belinchon. València, 1991
- Dèria i fal·lera. La Forest d'Arana. València, 1996
- Sediments d'albaïna i maregassa. Brosquil Edicions. València, 2002

Narrative writing

- Dotze contes i una nota necrològica. El Cingle. València,1985
- Guarda't dels jocs del destí. Brosquil Edicions. València, 2005
