= Eva Yárnoz =

Spanish writer (born 1975)

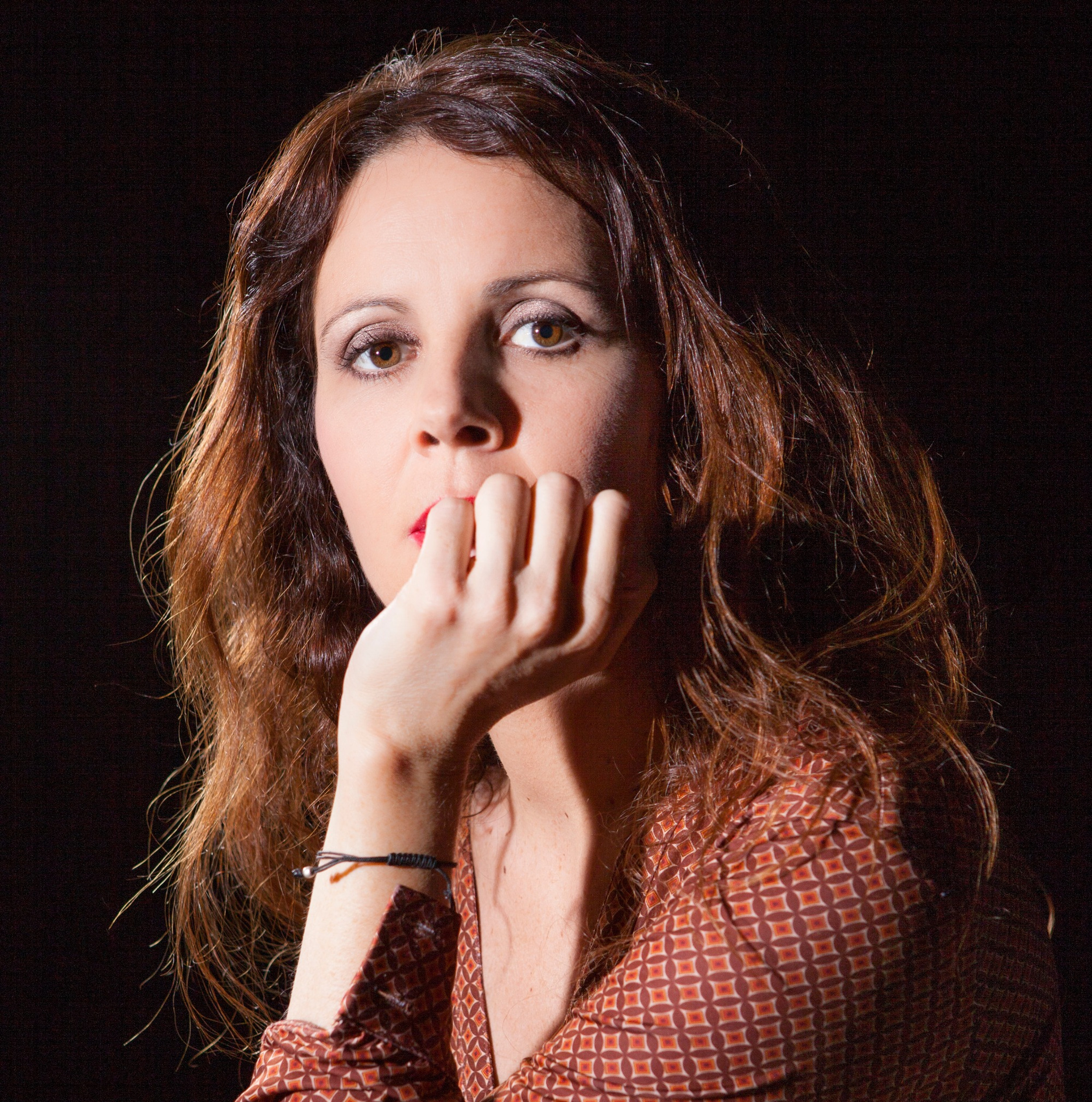
- Born: Eva Arribas Yárnoz; 1975 (age 50–51); Pamplona
- Education: Universidad Autónoma de Madrid (Spain); University of Portsmouth (United Kingdom); Universidad Internacional de la Rioja (UNIR)
- Occupations: Writer, Secondary school teacher of Spanish language and literature.
- Awards: Flor the Jara Poetry Award 2016; finalist in the César Simón Poetry Award 2015.
- Website: evayarnoz.com

Eva Yárnoz (born 1975) is a Spanish writer and visual artist; she won the Flor de Jara de Poetry Award 2016 for her poetry work Filiación and was finalist of the César Simón Poetry Award 2015 for her work Cauces del que teje.

== Early life and education ==
Yárnoz was born in Pamplona (Navarra), where she lived until she was 20 years old. She moved to Madrid to study Spanish literature at the Universidad Autónoma de Madrid. Before that, she studied a foundation year Diploma in English at the University of Portsmouth. Recently, she has studied a Master Degree at the Universidad Internacional de la Rioja (UNIR).

== Career ==
Later she worked as a translator.

In 2015, she published Universalia ante rem, her first book, a set of long poems that sought to explore one's own consciousness with a very recognizable poetic voice. In the words of Rafael Morales, professor at the Universidad Autónoma de Madrid, "it is proposed (...) from the freedom of a saying out of its promotion. A first book attentive to the self and emptiness, from a certain way of making one's own consciousness prevail and of looking at Spanish poetry from a non-realistic perspective, in her case."

In 2016, she received the Flor de Jara Poetry Prize for her book Filiación, which was published in 2017. In the words of the poet Juan Carlos Mestre, president of the jury, the book "fulfills the function of being an act against all the humiliations of the language of normalization and power."

In 2019, Yárnoz published her third collection of poems Cauces del que teje. This book had previously been a finalist for the César Simón Poetry Prize in 2015 . About this collection of poems, the critic Carlos Alcorta says: "The poetry of Eva Yarnoz (Pamplona, 1975) does not seek to clarify the mechanisms of reality from an anecdotal fact because "reality is a space that is deformed" and the anecdote tends to seek in the discursive its immobility, its permanence, the opposite of what our poet seeks.

In 2023, she published a poetic anthology Cierva como mi muerte. It is a handmade limited edition with reproductions of plastic works by Yarnoz.

In 2025, she published Camino de sedición, a work that, according to the author's website, is "A title that engages with the Camino by Baroja and Teresa of Ávila. We find a more intelligible and reflective language than in previous texts. Thematically, it explores power relations and the dreamlike quality of life."

== Books ==
- 2015 - Universalia ante rem. Neopatria Publishing.
- 2017- Filiación. Flor de Jara Poetry Award 2016.
- 2019 - Cauces del que teje. Trea Publishing. Finalist of the César Simón Poetry Award. Trea Publishing.
- 2023 - Cierva como mi muerte. Cartonera del Escorpión Azul.
- 2025 - Camino de sedición. Dilema Publishing.

=== Poetry magazines ===
- Published poems in Vallejo & Co.
- Published poems in Babab, 10 agosto, 2019..
- Published poems in Mascarada, 23 abril, 2019..
- «El territorio del cuerpo»: Revista Latinoamericana de Cultura. Año 7. ISSN: 2462-893X (En línea).
- «De lo celeste»: June 2019 Edition in Literariedad, Revista Latinoamericana de Cultura. Año 6. Semana 24. ISSN: 2462-893X (En línea).
- Published poems in Cuadernos del Matemático, 56-57-58. Marzo, 2018.
- Published poems in Nayagua nº 25
- Published poems in Conversos nº 17
- Published poems in Conversos nº 29.

=== Reviews ===
- Francisco Martínez Souzas, "Poemas entreverados de pensamiento"
- Francisco Martínez Bouzas. Brújulas y espirales.
- Rafael Morales, Cuadernos del matemático
- Carlos Alcorta: Literatura y arte

== Awards and honours ==
- Flor de Jara de Poesía Poetry Award 2016
- Finalist in César Simón Poetry Award 2015

== Visual arts ==
Yárnoz's visual work is abstract, sometimes symbolic, sometimes full of plastic accidents, with a broad, fast and emotional stroke.

Yárnoz exhibited during the spring of 2021 at the Cepi de Arganzuela of the Community of Madrid. The exhibition, entitled Cardinal, Designs from a universal repository, was mainly nourished by very fluid production based on acrylics, pastels and graphite. The exhibited work was structured in two series:

1. Designs.
2. Variations.
