= Rebeca Quintáns =

Spanish journalist, research writer and teacher (born 1964)

- Rebeca Quintáns López
- Born: 1964 (age 61–62); Arzúa, Spain
- Education: Journalism
- Alma mater: Complutense University of Madrid
- Occupations: Journalist, research writer and teacher
- Writing career
- Pen name: Patricia Sverlo
- Language: Spanish, Galician
- Genres: Non-Fiction, biography, research
- Subject: Juan Carlos I of Spain
- Notable works: Un rey golpe a golpe (2000); Juan Carlos I: la biografía sin silencios (2016)

Rebeca Quintáns López (Arzúa, A Coruña, 1964) is a Spanish journalist, research writer and teacher.

== Biography ==
Rebeca Quintáns graduated in Spanish Philology by the University of Santiago de Compostela. She got a doctorate in Journalism from the Complutense University of Madrid with a thesis about the speech of Juan Carlos I.

Her first book, Un Rey golpe a golpe (A King coup by coup), was released by the publisher Ardi Beltza and signed under the pseudonym of Patricia Sverlo for security reasons. It was the sequel of her doctoral thesis, which in words of the author: "there was so much contrast between the truth of the figure of Juan Carlos and the image created in the media during the Transition that I was looking forward to tell all that".

As a journalist she has written in various media both conventional (Interviú, Tiempo, El Semanal or El Correo Gallego among others) and alternative (Ardi Beltza, Kale Gorria, El Otro País, No a la Guerra or Diagonal). She is also a Secondary school teacher and has worked as an associate professor in the Faculty of Information Sciences of the Complutense University of Madrid.

In 2016 she published Juan Carlos I: la biografía sin silencios (Juan Carlos I: the biography without silences), an updated extension of the trajectory of the king emeritus where she reviews different aspects of his life not treated by conventional media.

== Books ==
- Un Rey golpe a golpe. Biografía no autorizada de Juan Carlos de Borbón (2000). Under the pseudonym of Patricia Sverlo.
- Gran Hermano: el precio de la dignidad (2000). With Andrés Sánchez Díaz.
- Juan Carlos I: la biografía sin silencios (2016).
