= Cristina Rodríguez (journalist) =

Spanish writer (born 1972)

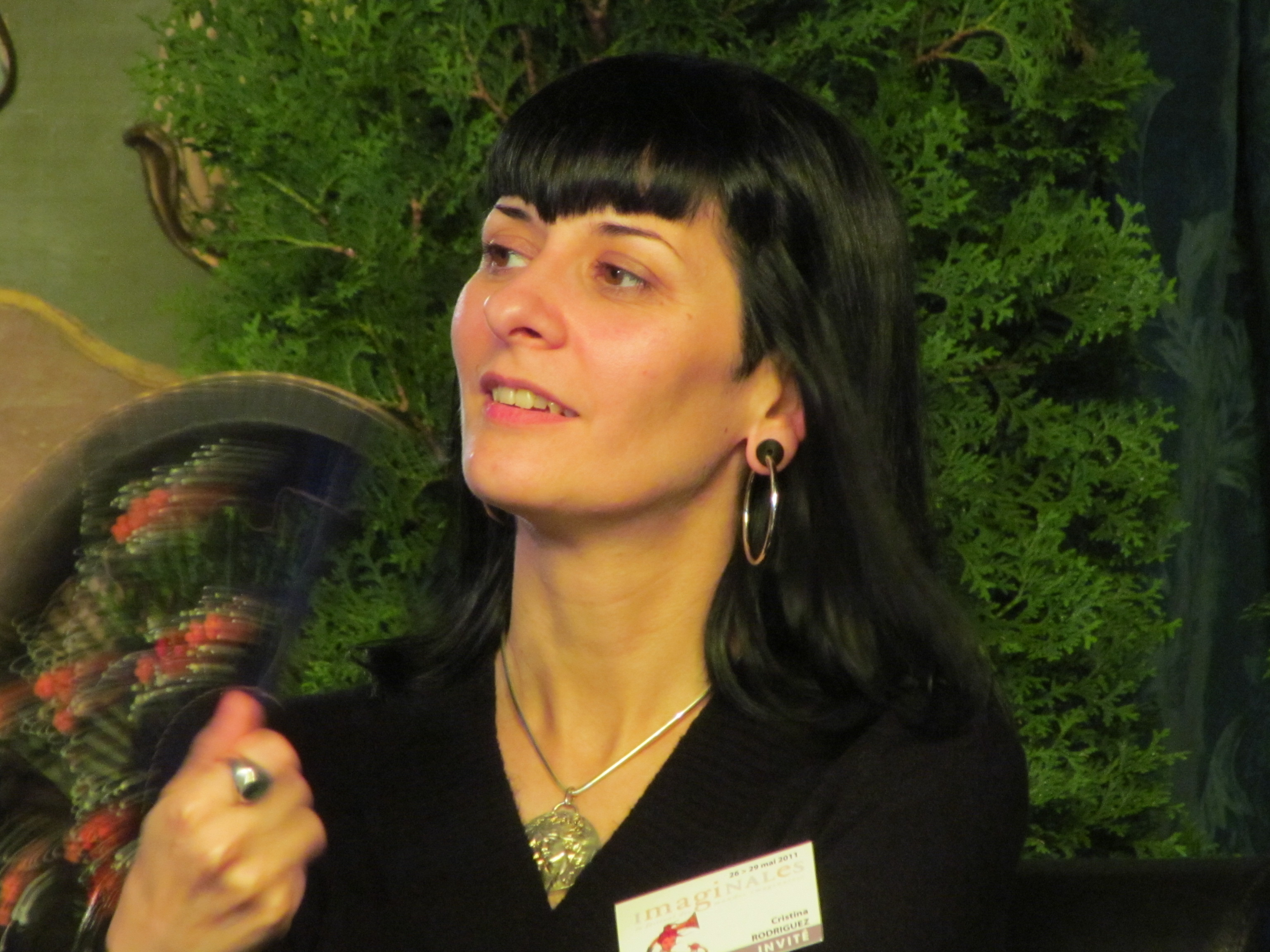
- Rodríguez in 2011
- Born: January 1, 1972 (age 54); Spain
- Occupations: historian, writer
- Writing career
- Pen name: Claude Neix, Tina Kent, Frédéric Neuwald
- Language: Spanish, French
- Genres: Biography, historical novel, numismatics
- Website: www.cristina-rodriguez.net

Cristina Rodríguez (born January 1, 1972) is a Spanish historian and novelist who writes in the French language. A historian specialising in the Early Roman Empire, a biographer of Caligula and Nero, she is best known for her historical novels and numerous articles on numismatics.

Rodríguez has also published hundreds of short stories and fanfics on the Internet.

== Works ==
Rodríguez has published works in her own name and under pseudonyms.

=== As Cristina Rodríguez ===
- Mon Père, je m'accuse d'être banquière (ou ce que votre banquier ne vous dira jamais), Disjoncteur, collection « Top secret », 1999 ISBN 2-91118-118-2.
- Les Mémoires de Caligula, Jean-Claude Lattès, 2000 ISBN 2-89431-216-4.
- Moi, Sporus, prêtre et putain, Calmann Lévy, 2001 ISBN 2-70213-184-0; Sporus, priest of Nero.
- Le César aux pieds nus, Flammarion, 2002 ISBN 2-08068-268-7.
- Thyia de Sparte, Flammarion, 2004 ISBN 2-08068-358-6.
- Les Enquêtes de Kaeso le prétorien :
  - t. 1, Les Mystères de Pompéi, du Masque, collection « Labyrinthes », 2008 ISBN 978-2-7024-3404-8.
  - t. 2, Meurtres sur le Palatin, du Masque, collection « Grands formats », 2010 ISBN 978-2-7024-3513-7.
  - t. 3, L'Aphrodite profanée, du Masque, collection « Grands formats », 2011 ISBN 978-2-7024-3541-0.
- Le baiser du banni, Pré aux Clecs, 2012 ISBN 2-84228-493-3.

=== As Claude Neix ===
- Un ange est tombé, Gaies et Lesbiennes, France, 2001 ISBN 2-91270-606-8; re-edition Studio Gothika, 2010
- Cœur de démon, Gaies et Lesbiennes, France, 2003 ISBN 2-91270-619-X.
- L'Elfe rouge, H&O, France, 2011 ISBN 978-2-84547-227-3.

=== As Tina Kent ===
- Access denied, Flammarion, collection "black Flammarion," 2002 ISBN 2-08068-320-9.

=== As Frédéric Neuwald ===
- Les Feux d'Héphaïstos (Fires of Hephaestus):
  - t. 1, L'ombre d'Alexandre, Flammarion, 2004 ISBN 2-08068-357-8.
  - t. 2, Le tombeau d'Anubis, Flammarion, 2005 ISBN 2-08068-696-8.
