= Josephine Lys =

Spanish Writer

- Born: Maria José López Sánchez; Madrid, Spain
- Occupations: novelist, Lawyer
- Writing career
- Years active: 2007-Presente
- Genre: Romance novel

Maria José López Sánchez, known by the pen name Josephine Lys, is a Spanish lawyer and writer of Romance novels since 2007. She is a member of the Association of Romantic Authors of Spain (ADARDE).

== Biography ==
María José López Sánchez was born in Madrid, Spain. She graduated in law from the University of Alcalá and practices as a lawyer. She published her first novel in 2007 and decided to use the pen name Josephine Lys, based on her extended first name and the initials of her two family names. In 2008 she published her second novel.

== Bibliography ==
=== Standalone novels ===
- Un disfraz de una dama (The costume of a lady, 2007)
- Atentamente tuyo (Sincerely yours, 2008)
- El guante y la espada (The Gauntlet and the Sword, 2012)
- Corazones de plata (Silver Hearts, 2018)

=== Hermanos MacGregor series ===
1. El hielo bajo tus pies (2019)
2. No puedo evitar amarte
3. Susúrrale mi nombre al viento
4. Dibuja tu nombre en mi piel (2020)
