= Paula Contreras Márquez =

Spanish writer (1911–2008)

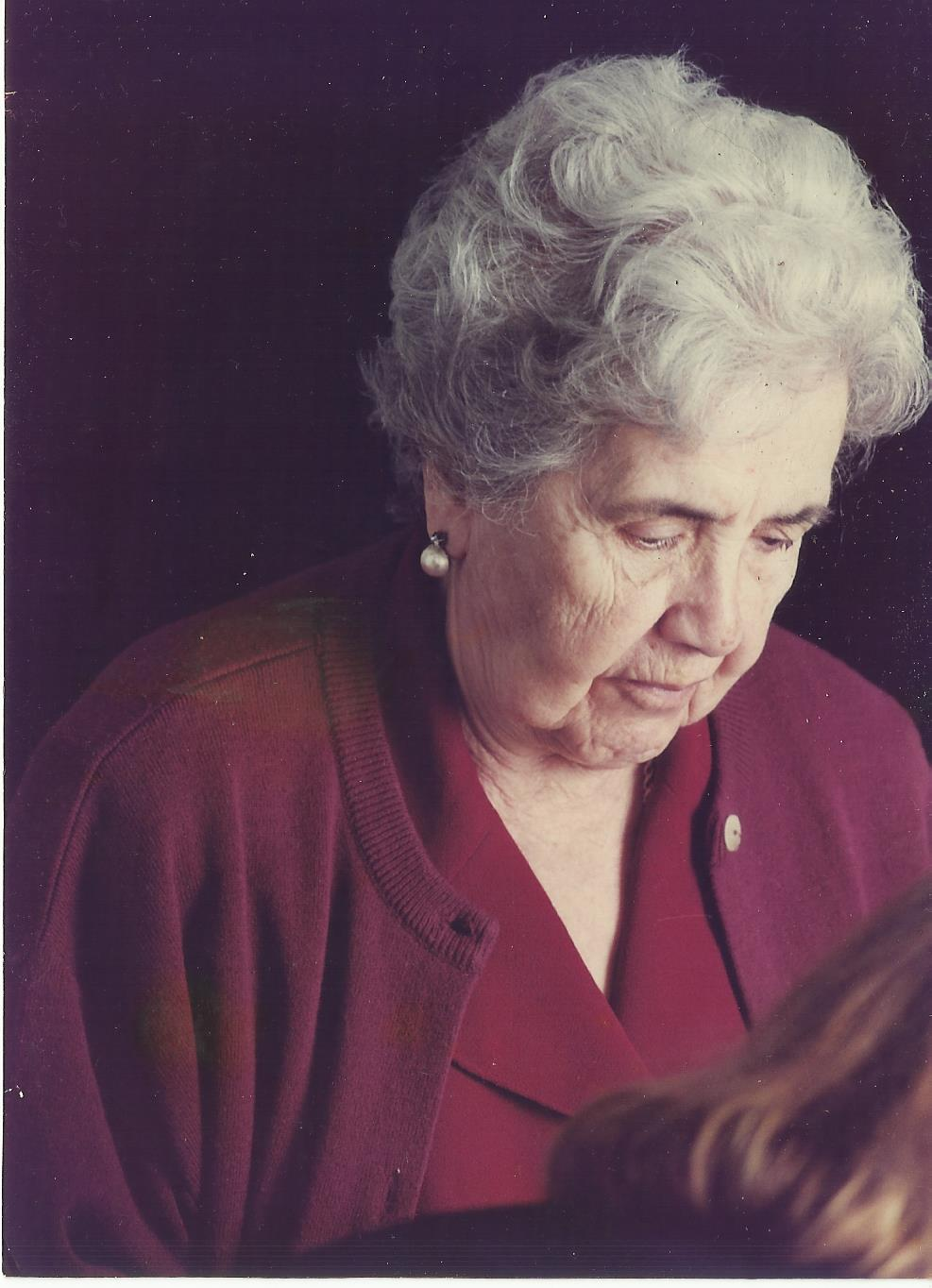
- Born: 8 January 1911; Córdoba, Andalusia
- Died: 3 February 2008 (aged 97); Cádiz
- Writing career
- Genres: novelist, short story writer

Paula Contreras Márquez (Aldea de Los Zapateros, Córdoba, Andalusia, 8 January 1911 – Puerto Real, Cádiz, 3 February 2008) was a novelist and author of short stories and tales.

Marquez was honored by a route around the town of Moriles, which was depicted in many of her notable works.

== Selected works ==
- El brujo del tiempo (early 1950s)
- Cangilones de noria (1951)
- Historias de un pueblo sin historia (1952) (Prologue by Federico Mayor Zaragoza)
- El Majuelo (1952)
- Americanos en Rota (1957)
- Una aventura sin importancia (1967)
- Laguna Grande (1992)
- Moriles, trazos de su historia (1995)
- La botica de la calle de la plaza (unfinished, recent years)
- Un mes de permiso (undated)
- La chavala(1962)
