= Dolores Martí de Cid =

- Born: September 6, 1916; Madrid, Spain
- Died: 1993 (aged 76–77); New York City
- Education: University of Havana
- Occupations: Writer, educator
- Spouse: José Cid Pérez

Dolores Martí de Cid (September 6, 1916 – 1993) was a Spanish expert on Latin American theater and literature.

== Biography ==
Dolores Martí de Cid was born in Madrid, Spain, on September 6, 1916. As the daughter of a Cuban diplomat, she studied in many countries and became fluent in several languages. Dolores received her doctorate in "Filosofía y Letras" in 1943, from the University of Havana.

Dolores married José Cid Pérez, a prominent Cuban playwright, in 1939 and worked with him for the rest of her life on their studies of Latin American theater. Dolores and José left Cuba in 1960, due to Fidel Castro's Communist revolution, and came to the United States, where she became an American citizen in 1970. Dolores began teaching at the University of Kansas and then was a professor at Purdue University. After they left Cuba, Castro burned their 25,000-volume personal library, which included some priceless and irreplaceable material and which was said to be "the best library in the world on Latin American theater." Fortunately, their files accumulated over twenty-five years on Latin American Indian theater were saved through the friendship of a foreign diplomat in Havana.

She lectured in several countries, wrote many articles and books on Latin American theater, as well as textbooks, and received many awards and honors as a result. One of her published books is Tres Mujeres de América. Teatro Indio Precolombino and Poesías Completas de Gertrudis Gómez de Avellaneda were also published by Dolores with José Cid as co-author. Dolores Martí de Cid, who devoted her life to the study of Latin American literature and culture, died in New York City, in May 1993.

== Works or publications ==
- Gramática y redacción del español. La Habana: Cultura. 1956. OCLC 651291755.
- Literatura precolombina. Madrid: La Muralla. 1978. OCLC 6488126.
- Páginas de un diario... José Cid-Pérez... James E. McKinney... Dolores Marti de Cid. St. Louis: McGraw-Hill book Co. 1966. OCLC 490745673.
- Papers on Romance Literary Relations. West Lafayette, Ind.: Dept. of Foreign Languages and Literatures, Purdue University. 1982. OCLC 166227643.
- Presencia Del Quijote En Hispanoamérica [conferencia]. Lawrence: Center of Latin American Studies. 1963. OCLC 951576.
- Teatro Cubano Contemperáneo. Madrid: Aguilar. 1959. OCLC 250950130.
- Teatro Cubano Contemporaneo. Con Un Ensayo : El Teatro En Cuba Republicana / Por José Cid Pérez. Madrid: Aguilar. 1962. OCLC 310646587.
- Teatro cubano contemporáneo. Madrid: Aguilar. 1962. OCLC 1592959.
- Teatro cubano contemporáneo : Luis A. Baralt, Tragedia indiana; José Cid Pérez, Hombres de dos mundos; Carlos Felipe, El Traviesa Jimmy; Renée Potts, Imagíname infinita; José A. Ramos, Tembladera; Marcelo Salinas, Alma Guajira. Selección y notas de Dolores Martí de Cid... Ensayo "El Teatro en Cuba republicana", por José Cid Pérez. [2a edición.] Madrid: Aguilar. 1962. OCLC 460483327.
- Teatro Cubano Contemporáneo. Luis A. Baralt. Tragediạ Iṇdiana. José Cid Pérez. Hombres De Dos Mundos. Carlos Felipe. El Travieso Jimmy. Renée Potts. Imagíname Infinita. José A. Ramos. Tembladera. Marcelo Salinas. Alma Guajira. Selección Y Notas De D. Martí De Cid. Con Un Ensayo El Teatro En Cuba Republicana Por José Cid Pérez. [With Portraits.] Madrid. 1959. OCLC 562638480.
- Teatro cubano, contemporáneo. Selección y notas de Dolores Martí de Cid. Madrid: Aguilar. 1951. OCLC 314374417.
- Teatro indio precolombino: El Güegüense. Madrid: Aguilar. 1964. OCLC 213780377.
- Teatro indio precolombino: El Güegüense, o, Macho ratón; El varón de Rabinal; Ollantay. Madrid: Aguilar. 1964. OCLC 175878.
- Teatro indoamericano colonial. Madrid: Aguilar. 1973. OCLC 1425744.
- El pobre más rico, de Gabriel Centeno de Osma. Chapel Hill, N.C.: University of North Carolina. 1969. OCLC 8834556.
- Hacia una interpretación del teatro martiano. Madrid: Playor. 1979. OCLC 8836025.
