= Francesca Forrellad =

Catalan writer

Francesca Forrellad i Miquel (27 May 1927-2 March 2013) was a Catalan writer and the twin sister of Lluïsa Forrellad.
