= Margarita de Mayo Izarra =

Spanish writer, teacher, and journalist

- Born: 20 July 1889; Polán, Spain
- Died: 1969 (aged 79–80); Madrid, Spain
- Occupations: Writer, teacher, journalist

Margarita de Mayo Izarra (20 July 1889 – 1969) was a Spanish writer, teacher, and journalist.

== Professional career ==
Margarita de Mayo, after obtaining the title of teacher of Primary Higher Education, taught at a graduate school for girls in Valdepeñas from 1914 to 1918.

Beginning in mid-1918, she worked at the secretariat of the Junta para Ampliación de Estudios e Investigaciones Científicas (JAE), being responsible, from the end of that year until 1924, for teaching in the preparatory section at the Instituto-Escuela.

In 1921, she began to study, thanks to scholarships granted to her, in Great Britain, where she obtained a place at King's College for Women in London.

In 1924, Mayo was named a pensioner of the JAE to attend Vassar College in New York, where she ended up being a permanent member of the Spanish Department until she retired in 1956.

Of her work, her journalistic side is the best known. Her beginnings as a journalist took place in the 1930s, when she began to publish in the provincial and limited circulation press, such as El Bien Público, a monarchic newspaper of Mahón, and La Correspondencia Militar, Madrid Científico, and Nuevo Mundo of Madrid. She sometimes signed her articles as M. de Mayo Izarra, and in them she tried to familiarize Spanish readers with American cities such as New York and the American way of life.

== Works ==
- Lluvia de Hijos: farsa cómica en tres actos (1915)
- Nuestros prosistas y poetas, Burgos
- Galdós (selección de textos por Margarita de Mayo), 1922
- Tradiciones y leyendas de Toledo, Burgos
- "Planes de trabajo" para la JAE, París, 1925
- Obras de Benito Pérez Galdós (edición literaria a cargo de Margarita de Mayo), 1935
