= Annabel Cervantes =

Spanish-Catalan writer

Annabel Cervantes Muñoz (born 1969 in Barcelona) is a Spanish-Catalan writer in the Catalan language.

She studied Geography and History at the University of Barcelona, with a major in the environment, but she left this occupation to dedicate herself to literature. She currently lives in Castelldefels.

== Selected works ==
- L'harmònica de vidre, 1999
- L'informe del cartògraf, 2000
- Qualsevol diumenge, esports d'aventura, 2004
- Ocell de mar endins, 2007.
- Celobert, 2008.
- La Maledicció d'Alietzer. Alisis (Ara Llibres). Barcelona, 2009.
- "Crims.cat 2.0", 2013. AlRevés. "Negra nit al carrer de l'Aurora" . Anthology of thriller's stories in Països Catalans.

== Awards ==
- Premi Sant Jordi, Castelldefels 1999
- Premi Sant Jordi, Begues, 2000
- Primer Premi de Narrativa Mercè Rodoreda de Molins de Rei, 2004
- IV Premi Pollença de Narrativa, 2007
- III Premi de Narrativa Breu Districte V, 2008
- "Reflexos d'Estiu", Novel. Short-listed on Premi Narrativa Delta, 2011
