= Lluïsa Forrellad =

Spanish writer (1927–2018)

Lluïsa Forrellad i Miquel (27 May 1927 – 4 August 2018) was a Spanish writer who wrote in Catalan and Spanish. She received the Premio Nadal in 1953 for Siempre en capilla. She was the twin sister of Francesca Forrellad.

== Bibliography ==
=== Theatre plays ===
- Dos razones
- Regimiento de caza 43

=== Novels ===
- Siempre en capilla (Barcelona: Editorial Destino, 1953)
- Foc latent (Barcelona: Angle Editorial, 2006)
- Sempre en capella (Barcelona: Angle Editorial, 2007)
- Retorn amarg (Barcelona: Angle Editorial, 2008)
- El primer assalt (Barcelona: Angle Editorial, 2009)
- L'olor del mal (Barcelona: Angle Editorial, 2011)
