= Àngels Cardona Palmer =

- Born: 1951; Palma, Balearic Islands; Spain
- Occupation: Writer, teacher
- Language: Catalan

Àngels Cardona Palmer (born 1951 in Palma) is a Catalan language writer, teacher and social and cultural activist who was raised on Mallorca.

== Biography ==
Àngels Cardona Palmer was born in the neighborhood of Santa Catalina of Palma, Spain in 1951. After studying only in Spanish in a convent during the post-war period, in her maturity she decided to study again in her mother tongue, Catalan. She studied the works of Blai Bonet, Josep Maria Llompart, Maria Mercè Marçal, the writings by Clarice Lispector or Djuna Barnes, and the literary transgression of Charles Bukowski.

Àngels Cardona decided to pursue a career in poetry because, as she says, "it is for me the essentiality, the synthesis of truth that remains hidden in everyday life to find different languages to say the same things, to enrich thought and, consequently, our world". Her work is characterized for being written from a gender perspective. She has participated in the documentary Som elles ("We are they"), about female poets of Mallorca. She is currently a teacher at an institute in the center of Palma.
