= Goya Gutiérrez =

Spanish poet and writer (born 1954)

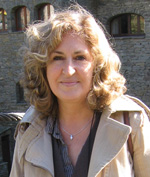
- Born: November 17, 1954 (age 71); Cabolafunte, Zaragoza (Spain)
- Writing career
- Genre: Poetry
- Website: www.telefonica.net/web2/goya-gutierrez

Goya Gutiérrez is a Spanish poet and writer.

== Biography ==
Born in a small village of the Aragon region, Spain, in 1954, Gutiérrez has lived in Barcelona since 1968. She holds a degree in Spanish Philology from the University of Barcelona.

== Published literary works ==
=== Books of poetry ===
- Regresar Editorial Bauma Cuadernos de poesía (Barcelona, 1995)
- De mares y espumas Editorial La mano en el cajón (Barcelona, 2001)
- La mirada y el viaje Editorial Emboscall. Colección "Prima Materia" número 40(Vic – Barcelona, 2004)
- El cantar de las amantes Editorial Emboscall (Vic- Barcelona, 2006)
- Ánforas Editorial Devenir (Madrid 2009)
- Hacia lo abierto, (Barcelona, 2011)
- Desde la oscuridad. From the darkness, (Barcelona, 2014)
- Grietas de luz, Editorial Vaso Roto Colección Poesía (2015)
- Y a pesar de la niebla, in-VERSO ediciones de Poesía (Barcelona, 2018)

=== Novels ===
- (e-book) Seres Circulares Amazon Kindle Direct Publishing, 2019.

=== Anthologies ===
- Carlos Morales (2005) "25 años de poesía en Cataluña (1980-2005)" Revista Cuadernos del Ateneo nº20. Ateneo de La Laguna (La Laguna - Tenerife, Spain)
- Antoni Clapés (2006) "Des de la Terra". Poesia als parcs 2005. Diputación de Barcelona (Barcelona, Spain)
- Teresa Costa-Gramunt and Yara Monturiol (2007) "Lluernes al celobert". March Editor (Barcelona, Spain)
- Josep Anton Soldevilla, et al. (2008) "El Laberinto de Ariadna". Editorial Emboscall (Vic-Barcelona, Spain).
- Meri Torres (2009) Antología poética "El poder del cuerpo". Editorial Castalia (Madrid, Spain)
- Antología Festival Internacional de Poesía de Curtea De Arges 2015 (Rumanía) Edita Academiei Internationale Orient-Occident.
- Edu Barbero Tiempo (in) Visible, Antología de fotografías de Edu Barbero y 24 poetas. Edita Revista Caravansari, Madrid, 2016.
- Vicente Luis Mora Ensayo "El sujeto boscoso. Tipologías subjetivas de la poesía española contemporánea entre el espejo y la notredad (1980-2015)". Editorial Iberoamericana Vervuer t, octubre del 2016.
- M.A. García de León, Milagros Salvador y María Sangüesa, Antología "Bajo la estrella el viento" Mujeres poetas de las dos orillas. Huerga & Fierro editores (Madrid, 2016) Prólogo: Juana Castro.
- Esteban Charpentier y Robert Max Oír ese Río Antología poética de los cinco continentes. Editorial Echarper, Colombia 2017.
