= Constanza Ossorio =

Spanish poet and writer

Constanza Ossorio (1564–1637), or Osorio, was a Spanish poet and writer. She was a nun in the Convent of Las Dueñas in Seville, of the cistercian order of Saint Bernard.

== Life ==
She was a talented child from an early age. At the age of 18, science and music teachers recognized her talent, so she was an organ singing chapel teacher for more than forty years. She had numerous illnesses, but these did not prevent her from continuous attendance to her work.

She was a woman of great intelligence, according to her convent companions, and learned Latin quickly. One day she read the Opuscule of Saint Bernard and based on she wrote her Huerto del Celestial Esposo, imitating the style and simple terms, with which she wrote all her works.

She became abbess in 1626 and, when her prelacy ended, her health deteriorated. She suffered severe pains, but bore them patiently most of the time except at the end, when she showed great affliction until she went to confession and finally died on October 3, 1637. She died at the age of 72 and after 65 years dedicated to religion.

== Works ==
She wrote Huerto del celestial esposo, Exposición sobre el profeta Jonás and Exposición de los Psalmos, among other poems of which only fragments have been preserved.

Huerto del celestial esposo is an untitled book based on the Opuscule of Saint Bernard and dedicated to Mr. Luis Portocarrero, Cardinal of the Holy Church of Rome (1669) and Archbishop of Toledo. It was published in 1686, after Ossorio's death, by Thomas Lopez de Haro. It contains in the preliminaries a Life of the Author, without signature (the dedication of the book is signed by the abbess Doña Benita Levanto). It also includes a poem.
