= Rosaura Lopez =

Spanish writer and John Lennon's maid (1932–2005)

- Born: 16 March 1932; Pontevedra, Spain
- Died: 19 September 2005 (aged 73); Pontevedra, Spain
- Years active: 1976–1980
- Known for: Maid to John Lennon and Yoko Ono
- Notable work: En casa de John Lennon (2005)

Rosaura Lopez Lorenzo (16 March 1932, Pontevedra, Spain – 19 September 2005, Pontevedra, Spain) was a maid of John Lennon and Yoko Ono in the Dakota apartment between 1976 and 1980.

== Biography ==
Lopez was born in Galicia, Spain in 1932. Her parents were bakers in the area of Pontevedra, Spain.

She arrived in Queens, New York in 1962, after sorting out visa issues so she could join her husband who had moved to New York in 1959. In 1974 she began working several jobs as a cleaner. One of them was at the Dakota building, in the apartment next door to Lennon and Ono. The owners had a good relationship with their neighbours and, when they decided to move to London, they rented the apartment to John and Yoko on the condition that Rosaura would continue her work there, as they wanted to keep her as an employee when they eventually returned to New York. Lopez worked for John and Yoko from 1976 until 1980. While working for them she taught John how to bake bread.

== En casa de John Lennon ==
In 2005, she wrote a book in Spanish reflecting that period: En casa de John Lennon (At John Lennon's House).

The book describes the author's daily life with the Lennon family in an affectionate manner, avoiding sensationalism. Lopez recalls how she became part of Lennons' service (Yoko consulted two fortune-tellers, "The Big O." and Lena, before signing her contract for the entire week). It has a lot of anecdotes, as when Lopez was asked, by an embarrassed Lennon, to unblock a toilet that had been clogged with what appeared to be an empty marijuana bag, or the time that John accidentally burned a moka pot because he forgot to fill it with water. It also mentions that their bedstand was made by two church pews joined by wooden planks. Lopez recalls that the marriage appeared to be in good standing during those years, detailing how, on Yoko's birthday, John always gifted her carnations, always matching the number of flowers to her age. She also recounts an informal conversation with Lennon's eventual killer the day before his death. The final pages feature photographs of her, John, Yoko and Sean, along with postcards sent to her by the couple.
