= List of Spanish writers =

This is a list of writers, including novelists, essayists, poets, playwrights, and journalists, who were born in Spain or whose writings are closely associated with that country.

== A ==
- Iñaki Abad (born 1963), novelist and journalist
- Brianda de Acuña (1576–1630), nun and autobiographer
- Pilar Adón (born 1971), novelist, short story writer, poet, translator
- Silvia Agüero (born 1985), Roma feminist writer and human rights activist
- Pedro Antonio de Alarcón (1833–1891), novelist
- Rafael Alberti (1902–1999), poet, Cervantes Prize laureate (1983)
- Vicente Alberti y Vidal (1786–1859), writer
- Daniela Albizu (1936-2015), Basque teacher, writer, and councillor
- Jerónimo de Alcalá (1571–1632), physician and writer
- José Alcalá Galiano (1843–1919), writer, poet and humorist
- Baltasar del Alcázar (1530–1606), poet
- Ignacio Aldecoa (1925–1969), novelist and poet
- Mateo Alemán (1547–c. 1609), novelist
- Vicente Aleixandre (1898–1984), poet, Nobel Prize laureate (1977)
- Florina Alías (1921–1999), writer
- Dámaso Alonso (1898–1990), poet, Cervantes Prize laureate (1978)
- Núria Añó (b. 1973), novelist and biographer
- Tomás de Añorbe y Corregel (1686–1741), playwright and poet
- Jerónimo de Arbolanche (1546–1572), writer
- Trinidad Ardura, writer
- Juan de Arguijo (1567–1623), writer, poet and musician during the Spanish Golden Age
- Juan Ariza (1816–1876), Romantic novelist, poet, and playwright
- Raimon Arola (born 1956), art historian specializing in sacred symbolism and hermetic tradition
- Alfonso Clemente de Arostegui y Cañavate (1698–1774), Catholic bishop, writer, lawyer, and diplomat
- Francisco Asensi (1936–2013), religious writer
- Francisco Ayala (1906–2009), novelist, Cervantes Prize laureate (1991)
- Wenceslao Ayguals de Izco (1801–1873), writer and editor
- Azorín (José Martínez Ruiz) (1863–1967), journalist, poet, novelist and essayist

== B ==
- Lola Badia (born 1951), philologist, medievalist
- Frutos Baeza (1861–1918), poet and writer in the Murcian dialect
- Gaspar de Baeza (1540–1569), humanist, lawyer, translator and writer known during the Spanish Golden Age
- Ricardo Baeza Durán (1890–1956)
- Rafael Balanzat y Baranda (1820–1854), writer and military man
- Andrés Baquero (1853–1916), teacher, researcher, and writer
- Bárbara de Santo Domingo (1842–1872), Catholic mystic writer
- Elia Barceló (born 1957), writer
- Juan Barcia Caballero (1852–1926), Spanish physician and writer
- Pío Baroja (1872–1956), novelist of the Generation of '98
- Pedro Barrantes (1850–1912), writer, journalist
- Joaquín Bastús (1799–1873), writer and pedagogue
- Gustavo Adolfo Bécquer (1836–1870), romantic poet and tale writer
- Diego Beltrán Hidalgo (17th century), poet and critic
- Elísabet Benavent (born 1984), romance writer
- Jacinto Benavente (1866–1954), dramatist, Nobel Prize laureate (1922)
- Francisco Bermúdez de Pedraza (1585–1655), writer, jurist and historian
- Joan Binimelis (1538–1616), scientist and writer
- Carmen Blanco y Trigueros (ca. 1840 - 1921), writer, poet, and journalist
- Vicente Blasco Ibáñez (1867–1928), novelist, wrote The Four Horsemen of the Apocalypse (1916)
- Isidoro Bosarte (1747–1807), historian and writer
- Vicente Botín, journalist
- Ana Isabel Boullón Agrelo (born 1962), Galician linguist
- Antonio Buero Vallejo (1916–2000), playwright of the Generation of '36

== C ==
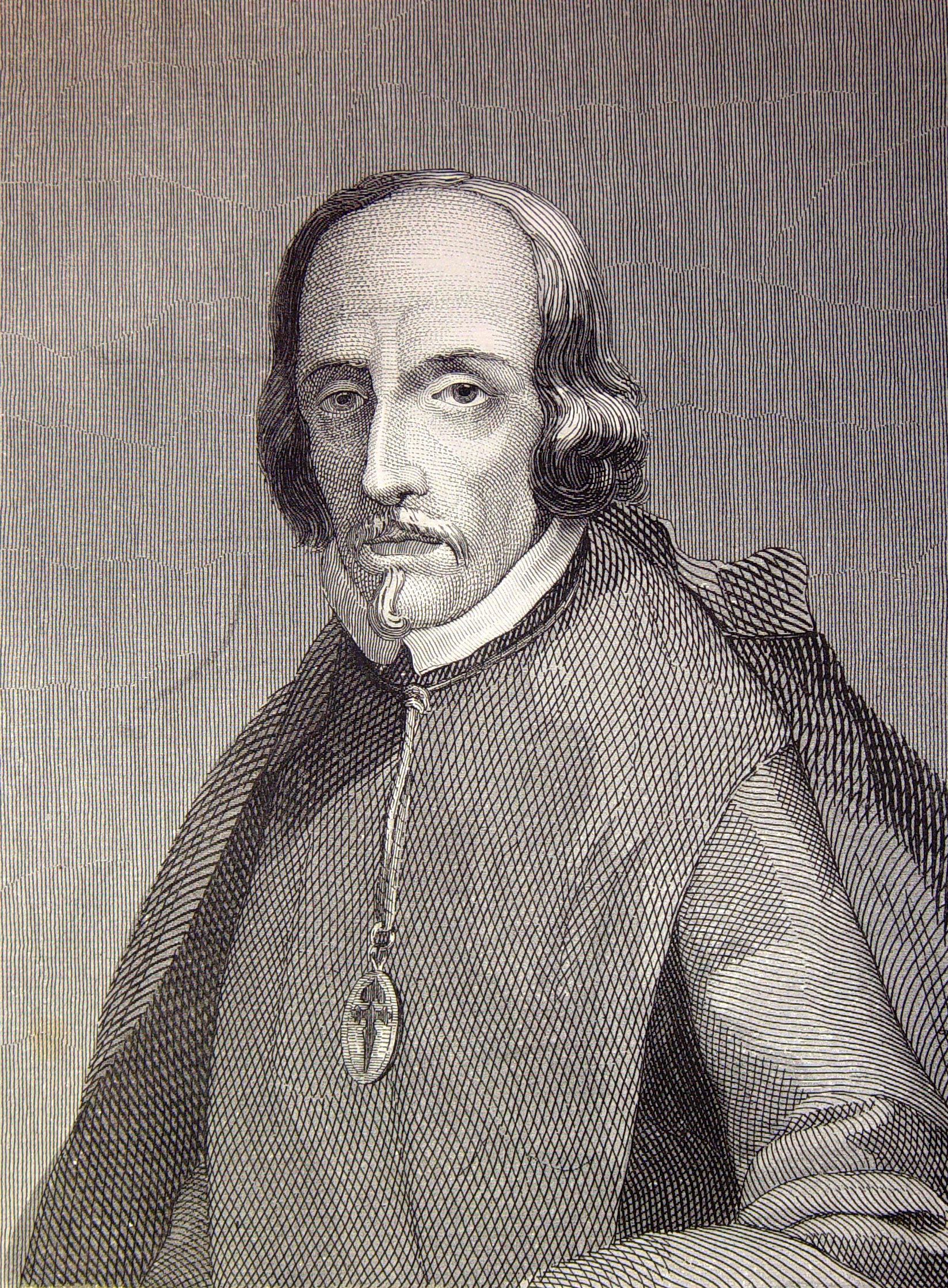
Pedro Calderón de la Barca

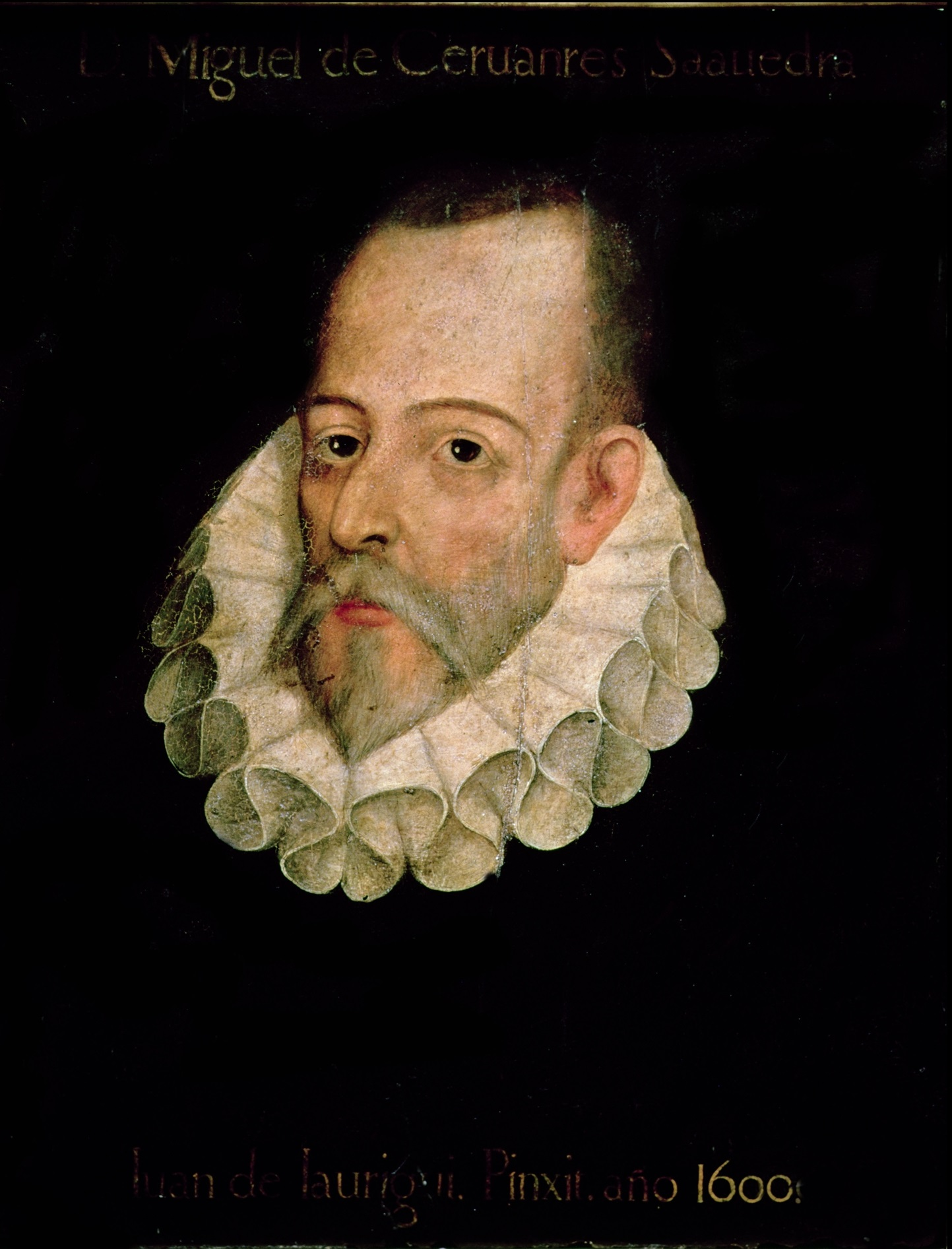
Miguel de Cervantes

- Cabret (late 14th century), translator
- Javier Cacho Gomez (born 1952), scientific writer and novelist
- Fernando Cagigal (1756–1824), poet and playwright
- Pedro Calderón de la Barca (1600–1681), playwright and poet of the Spanish Golden Age
- Luis Carandell Robusté (1929–2002), journalist and writer
- Manuel Casal (1751–1837), poet and polymath
- Félix Casanova de Ayala (1915–1990), poet
- José Joaquín Casasús (1733–1822), writer
- Francisco Cascales (1564–1642), humanist and writer
- Alejandro Casona (1903–1965)
- Abraham Castanho, (mid 17th century), poet
- José Manuel Castañón (1920–2001), novelist and essayist
- Mercedes Castro (born 1972), writer
- Rosalía de Castro (1837–1885), romanticist and poet
- Juan Francisco de Castro Fernández (1721–1790), priest, lawyer and writer
- José Carlos Cataño (born 1954), poet
- Cecilia del Nacimiento (1570–1646), nun, mystic, writer, and poet
- María Cegarra Salcedo (1899–1993), chemist, teacher, poet, councillor
- Camilo José Cela (1916–2002), novelist, Nobel Prize laureate (1989)
- Pancracio Celdrán (1942–2019), academic and journalist
- Francisco Cerdá y Rico (1739–1800), humanist, jurist and writer
- Francisco Cerecedo (1940–1977), journalist
- Miguel de Cervantes (1547–1616), novelist, poet and playwright, author of Don Quixote
- Edith Checa Oviedo (1957–2017), writer, poet, journalist
- Matilde Cherner (1833–1880), novelist, dramatist, literary critic, and journalist
- Clarín (Leopoldo Alas) (1852–1901), novelist, dramatist, literary critic, and journalist
- Gerónimo de la Concepción (1642–1698), writer
- Andrés del Corral (1748–1818), writer and archeologist
- Javier Cosnava (born 1971), novelist
- Eusebio Cuerno de la Cantolla (1850–1922), journalist and businessman

== D ==
- Filomena Dato (1856–1926), feminist, writer
- Pedro Víctor Debrigode (1914–1982), novelist
- Miguel Delibes (1920–2010), novelist, Cervantes Prize laureate (1993)
- Demófilo (1848–1893)
- Agustín Díaz Pacheco (born 1953), journalist and novelist
- Gerardo Diego (1896–1987), poet, Cervantes Prize laureate (1979)
- Rafael Dieste (1899–1981)
- María Magdalena Domínguez (1922–2021), poet
- María Dueñas (born 1964)

== E ==
- José Echegaray (1832–1916), dramatist, Nobel Prize laureate (1904)
- Francisco de Enciso Zárate, (?–1570), writer of chivalric romance novels
- Feliciana Enríquez de Guzmán (1569–c. 1644), playwright of the Spanish Golden Age
- Antonio Escohotado (1941–2021), philosopher and essayist
- Juan Escoiquiz (1762–1820), ecclesiastic, politician and writer
- Vicente Espinel (1550–1624), poet and novelist
- José de Espronceda (1808–1842), romantic poet
- Cristina Fernández Cubas (born 1945), novelist and short story writer
- César Fernández García (born 1967), novelist
- Leandro Fernández de Moratín (1760–1828), dramatist and neoclassical poet
- Pastora Filigrana (born 1981), non-fiction writer, columnist

== G-H ==
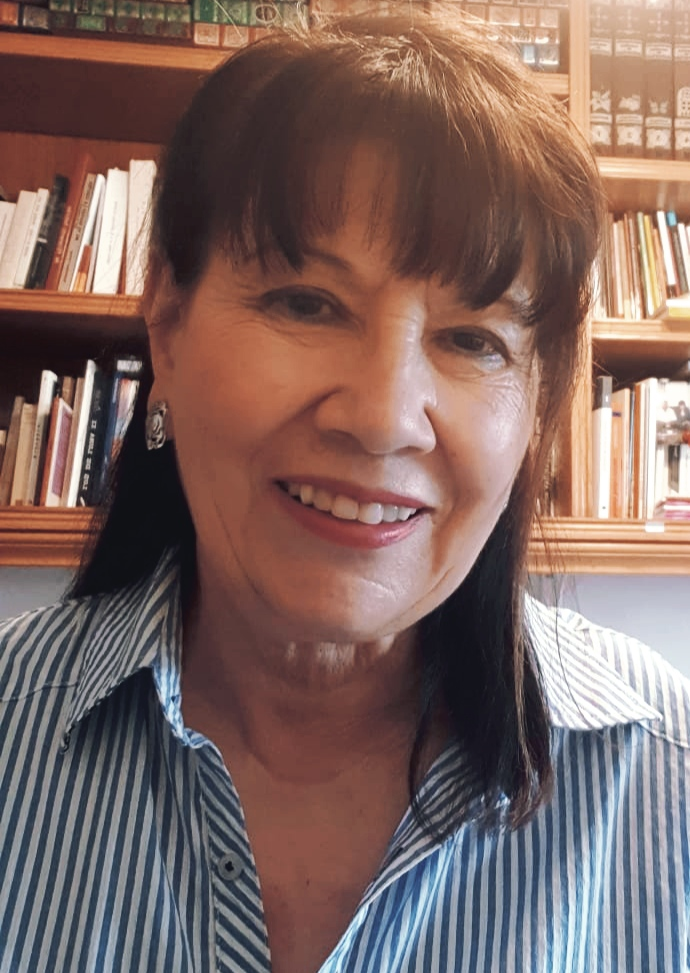
María Esther García López

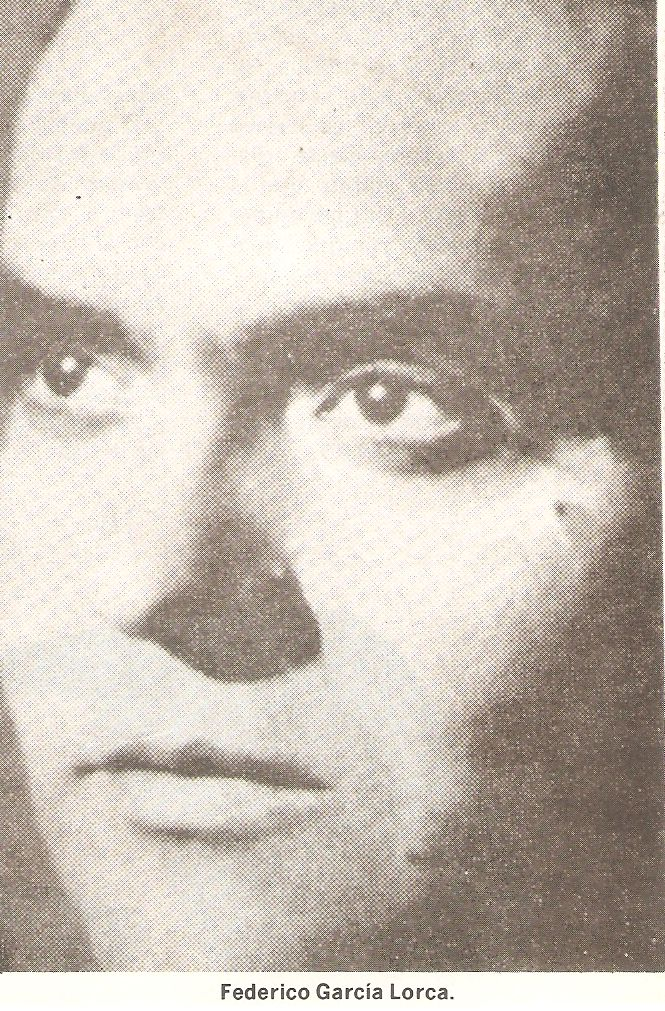
Federico García Lorca

- José María Gabriel y Galán (1870–1905), poet
- Antonio Gala (1930–2023), poet, dramatist and novelist
- Rafael Gambra Ciudad (1920–2004), philosopher and author
- Gabriel García-Badell (1936–1994), writer
- Cecilia García de Guilarte (1915–1989), essayist, playwright, novelist and journalist
- Juan García Hortelano (1928–1992)
- María Esther García López (born, 1948), poet and writer; president, Asturias Writers Association
- Vincent García de la Huerta (1734–1787), dramatist, poet, and critic
- Federico García Lorca (1898–1936), poet and dramatist of the Generation of '27
- Ignacio García Malo (1760–1812), playwright, translator, and writer
- Luis García San Miguel (1929–2006), jurist and author
- Blanca de Gassó y Ortiz (1846–1877), writer and poet
- Consuelo Gil (1905–1995) children's illustrated magazine publisher, editor, translator, and writer
- Juan Givanel (1868–1946), philologist and literary critic
- Ramón Gómez de la Serna (1888–1963), writer, dramatist and avant-garde agitator
- Luis de Góngora (1561–1627), lyric poet considered to be among the most prominent Spanish poets of all time
- Beremundo González Rodríguez (1909–1986), Galician writer and politician
- Enriqueta González Rubín (1832–1877), Asturian writer
- Juan Goyanarte (1900–1955), editor and writer
- Baltasar Gracián (1601–1658), Baroque prose writer and philosopher
- Josep Guijarro Triadó (born 1967), writer and journalist
- Jorge Guillén (1893–1984), poet, Cervantes Prize laureate (1976), four-time Nobel Prize nominee
- Antonio Guzman Reina (1921-1986), lawyer, politician and writer
- Miguel Hernández (1910–1942), poet
- Carla Herrero (born 1994), writer, blogger
- Juan López de Hoyos (1511–1583), Renaissance author

== I–L ==
- Antonio Iturbe (born 1967), journalist, professor, and editor
- Juan Antonio de Iza Zamácola (1756–1826), journalist, historian and writer
- Pablo de Jérica (1781–1841), writer and journalist
- Juan Ramón Jiménez (1881–1958), poet, Nobel Prize laureate (1956)
- John of the Cross (1542–1591), mystic poet
- Gaspar Melchor de Jovellanos (1744–1811), major figure of the Spanish Age of Enlightenment, philosopher, statesman, poet and essayist
- Robert Juan-Cantavella (born 1976), novelist and editor
- Jon Juaristi (born 1951), poet and essayist
- Rogelia León (1828–1870), poet, playwright, essayist, and narrative writer
- Juana Teresa Juega López (1885–1979), poet
- Use Lahoz (born 1976), novelist
- Mariano José de Larra (1809–1837), literary journalist
- Fray Luis de León (1527–1591), poet of the Spanish Golden Age
- Antonio F. Lera (born 1952), writer, translator, journalist, and publisher
- Julio Llamazares (born 1955), poet, novelist and journalist
- Jorge Llopis (1919–1976), satirist and playwright
- Francisco de Paula López de Castro (1771–1827), Neoclassical poet and writer
- María López Sández (born 1973), Galician philologist and essayist

== M ==
- Antonio Machado (1875–1939), leading poet of the Generation of '98
- Salvador de Madariaga (1886–1978), essayist and two-time Nobel Prize nominee
- César Mallorquí (born 1953)
- José Mallorquí Figuerola (1913–1972)
- Pedro Malón de Chaide (1530–1589), religious author
- Jorge Manrique (1440–1479), major Castilian poet
- Manuel Mantero (born 1930), poet and literary critic
- José María Díaz (1813–1888), Romantic journalist and playwright
- Salvador María Granés (1840–1911), journalist and author of comic theatre
- Francisco Mariano Nipho (1719–1803), writer and journalist
- Javier Marías (1951–2022), novelist and translator
- Manuel Marliani Cassens (1795–1873), writer, diplomat, and politician
- Juan Marquez (1565–1621), ascetic writer
- Juan Marsé (1933–2020), novelist and Cervantes prize laureate
- Rossend Marsol Clua (1922–2006), journalist and writer
- Alfons Marti (born 1968), writer
- Carmen Martín Gaite (1925–2000), novelist, essayist, and author of short stories
- Pablo Martín Asuero (born 1967), academic in Oriental studies
- Francisco Martínez Motiño
- Manuel Martínez Barrionuevo (1857–1917), poet and writer
- Pedro Luis Martínez Larriba (born 1946), playwright
- Augusto Martínez Olmedilla (1880–1965), novelist and journalist
- Joanot Martorell (1413–1468), author of the first novel, Tirant lo Blanc (1490)
- Juan Francisco Masdeu, Jesuit historian
- Juan María Maury (1772–1845), writer
- Patricia Mayayo (born 1967), art historian
- Marina Mayoral (1942), novelist, essayist
- Gonçal Mayos Solsona (born 1957), philosopher and essayist
- Fernando Rodríguez Méndez, journalist and novelist
- Rodrigo Méndez Silva (1606–1670), historian, genealogist, geographer and writer
- Rosa Méndez Fonte (born 1957), Galician writer, poet, and researcher
- Eduardo Mendoza (born 1943), novelist and Cervantes prize laureate
- Juan González Mesa (born 1975)
- Agustín Millares Sall (1917–1989), poet
- Juan Millé Giménez (1884–1945), writer and professor of literature
- Domingo Miras (1934–2022), dramatist
- José Manuel Mójica Legarre (born 1955), writer
- Tirso de Molina (1571–1648), playwright
- Gaspar de Molina y Zaldívar (1741–1806), architect, painter, poet and writer
- Francisco Antonio de Monteser (c. 1620–1668), dramatist of the Spanish Golden Age]
- Francisco Morales Lomas (b.1957), poet
- Iñigo Moré (born 1968), researcher and non-fiction writer
- Agustín Moreto y Cavana (1618–1661), dramatist and playwright
- José Luis Munárriz (1752–1830), literary critic, translator and writer
- Juan Jacinto Muñoz Rengel (born 1974), novelist

== O-Q ==
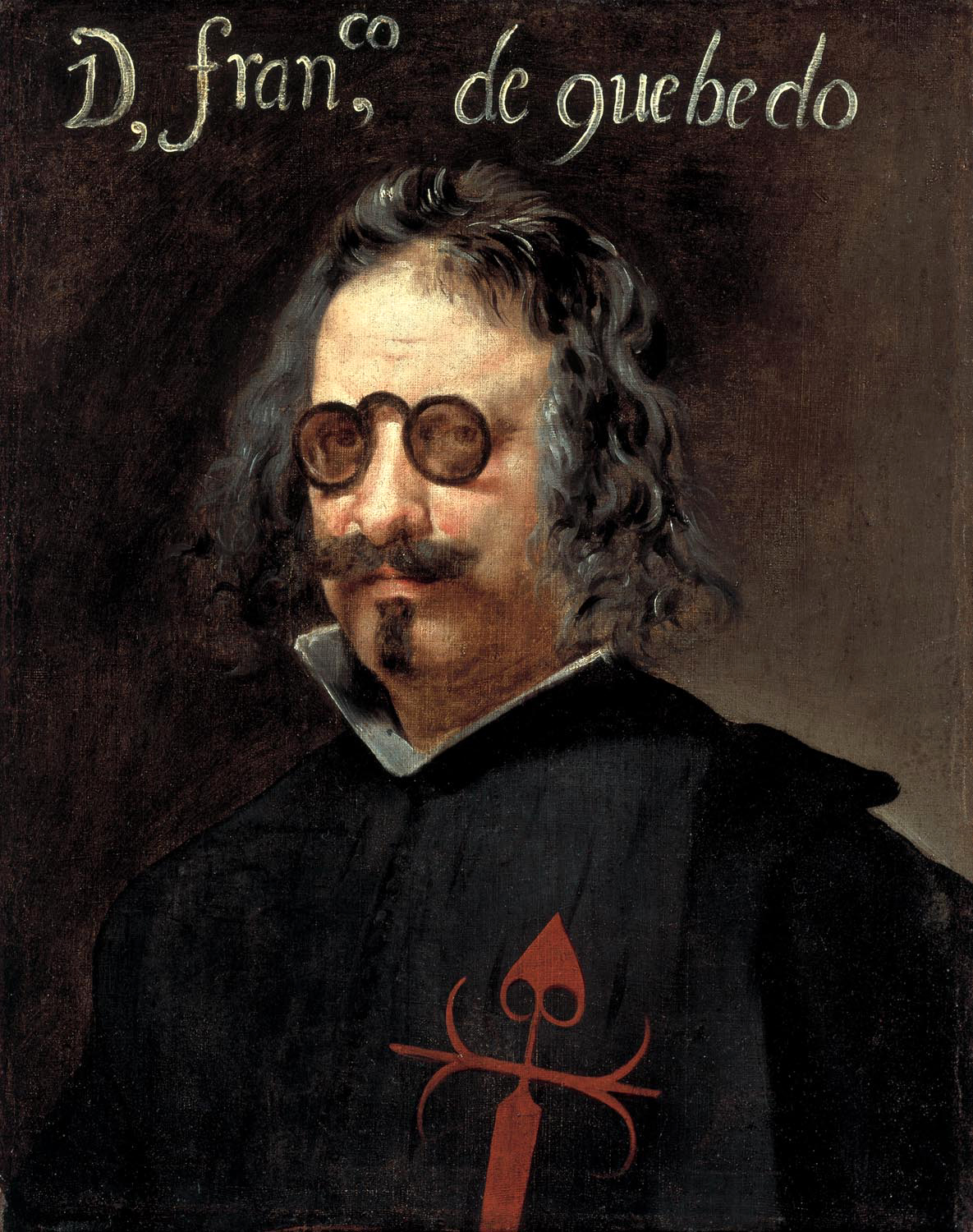
Francisco de Quevedo

- Ramón Ortega y Frías (1825–1883), writer
- José Ortega y Gasset (1883–1955), essayist
- José Ovejero (born 1958), novelist, essayist and poet
- Juan Lorenzo Obras se Palmireno (1514/1524–1579/1580), playwright and educator
- Constanza Ossorio (1595–1637), poet and writer
- Pilar Pallarés (born 1957), poet
- Carmelo Palomino Kayser (1952–2000), poet
- Emilia Pardo Bazán (1851–1921), writer of prose and poetry who introduced naturalism and feminist ideas to Spanish literature
- Jerónimo de Pasamonte (1553–after 1605), writer during the Spanish Golden Age
- Paul Pen (born 1979), author of literary fiction, thriller and suspense
- Andrés Pascual (born 1969), novelist
- Ánxeles Penas (born 1943), poet
- Benito Pérez Galdós (1843–1920), realist novelist considered by some to be second only to Cervantes in stature as a Spanish novelist
- Narcisa Pérez Reoyo (1849–1876), writer
- Arturo Pérez-Reverte (born 1951), best-selling novelist and journalist, member of the Royal Spanish Academy
- Marta Pessarrodona (born 1941), poet, literary critic, essayist, biographer
- Francisco Pi y Arsuaga (1865–1912)
- Francesc Pi i Margall (1824–1901), romanticist writer who was briefly president of the short-lived First Spanish Republic
- Berta Piñán (born 1963), writer, poet, politician
- Francisco de Pisa (1534–1616), Spanish historian and writer
- Álvaro Pombo, (1939), Spanish poet and novelist
- José Antonio Porcel (1715–1794), poet and writer
- Alana Portero (1978), writer, poet and playwright
- Miguel de Portilla y Esquivel (1660–1732), writer
- Gervasio Posadas (1962), novelist
- Santiago Posteguillo (born 1967), novelist
- Luz Pozo Garza (1922–2020), poet
- Núria Pradas (born 1954), Spanish philologist and writer
- Isabel Prieto de Landázuri (1833–1876), poet and dramatist
- James Prohens (1911–2007), Spanish-American poet
- Francisco de Quevedo (1580–1645), novelist, essayist and poet, master of Conceptism
- Eduardo Quiles (born 1940), playwright and writer
- Raúl Quinto (born 1978), poet and essayist

== R ==
- Juan Antonio Ramírez Domínguez (1948–2009), essayist
- Manuel Ramírez Fernández de Córdoba (1948–2007), journalist
- María del Carmen Reina Jiménez (born 1942), essayist, writer, activist, and politician
- Miguel del Rey Vicente, military historian
- José Amador de los Ríos (1818–1878) historian, archaeologist, art and literature
- David Roas (born 1965), short story writer and critic
- Fátima Rodríguez (b. 1961), writer, translator
- Pepe Rodríguez (born 1953)
- Rafael Rodríguez Mohedano (1725–1787), historian and writer
- Fernando de Rojas (1465–1541), novelist, author of La Celestina (1499)
- Carlos Rojas Vila (1928–2020)
- Francisco de Rojas Zorrilla (1607–1660), dramatist
- Luis Romero (1916–2009)
- Juan Ruiz de Alarcón (c. 1581–1639), dramatist
- Víctor Ruiz Iriarte (1912–1982), dramatist
- Carlos Ruiz Zafón (born 1964), best-selling novelist

== S ==
- Luis Sáenz de la Calzada (1912–1994), poet
- Pedro Salinas (1891–1951), poet
- Félix María Samaniego (1745–1801)
- Manuel Sánchez Cuesta (born 1942), philosopher
- Agustín Sánchez Vidal (born 1948), novelist
- Fernando Sánchez Dragó (1936–2023)
- Paloma Sánchez Garnica (1962)
- Miguel de los Santos Álvarez (1818–1892), romantic writer
- Francisca Sarasate (1853-1922), fiction writer, non-fiction writer, poet
- Marta Segarra (born 1963), philologist, university professor, and researcher
- Ramón J. Sender (1901–1982), novelist and journalist
- Manuel Siles Artés (1921–1984), writer
- Mariana de Silva-Bazán y Sarmiento, (1739–1784), aristocrat, poet, translator, painter
- María del Pilar Sinués de Marco (1835–1893), novelist, poet, non-fiction writer
- Antonio Soler (born 1956), novelist
- Dolores Soler-Espiauba (born 1935), novelist

== T-U ==
- Diego Tadeo González (1733–1794), poet
- Sofía Tartilán (1829–1888), novelist, essayist, journalist, editor
- Enrique Tierno Galván (1918–1986), essayist and lawyer who served as Mayor of Madrid from 1979 to 1986
- Juan Tizón (1895–1945), writer and politician
- Saulo Torón Navarro (1885–1974), poet
- Gonzalo Torrente Ballester (1910–1999), novelist
- Domingo Traggia (1744–1816), military academic, historian and writer
- Juan Manuel Trujillo (1907–1976), essayist and publisher
- Fernando Trujillo Sanz
- Pablo Tusset (born 1965), novelist
- Miguel de Unamuno (1864–1936), Basque essayist, novelist, poet, playwright, philosopher, professor of Greek and Classics, and later rector at the University of Salamanca
- Chusé Raúl Usón, publisher and a Spanish writer in the Aragonese language

== V ==
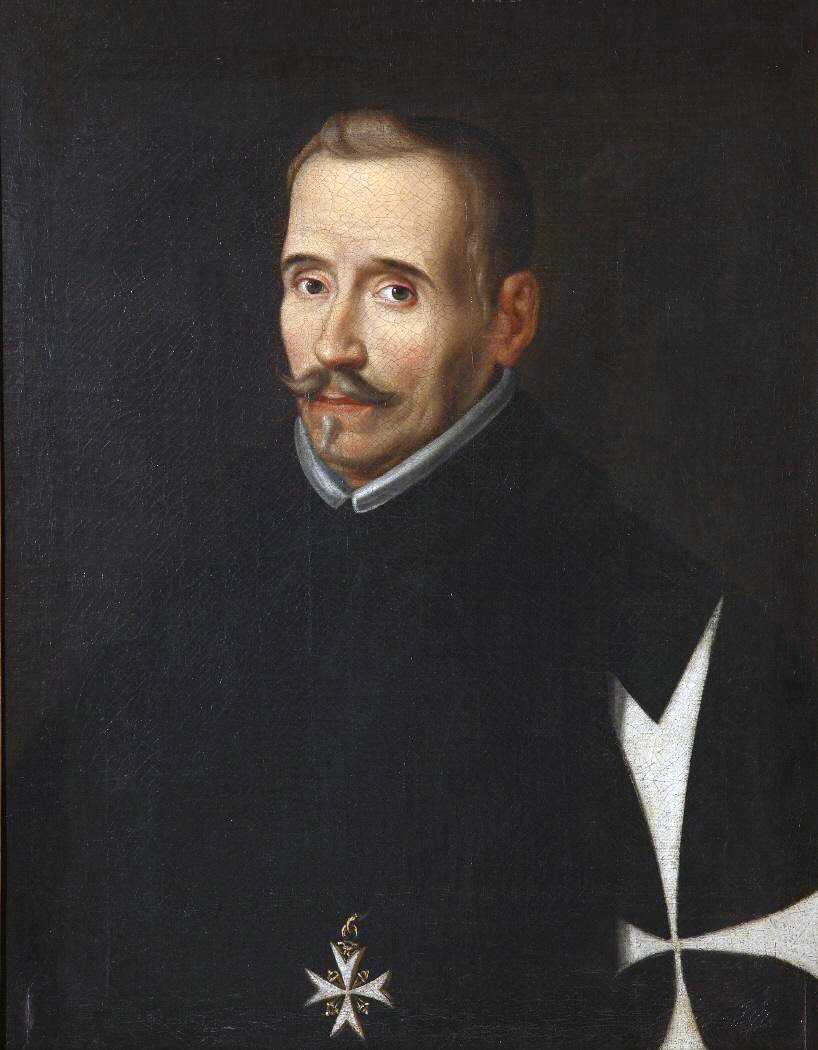
Félix Lope de Vega

- Antonio Valladares de Sotomayor (1737–1820), playwright, poet and journalist
- Ramón María del Valle-Inclán (1866–1936), radical dramatist, novelist and member of the Generation of '98
- José Rafael Valles Calatrava (born 1957), academic author and professor
- Juan Antonio Vallejo-Nágera Botas (1926–1990)
- Maria Vallejo-Nágera (born 1967), writer in Spanish
- Diego Valverde Villena (born 1967), poet and essayist
- Alberto Vázquez-Figueroa (born 1936), novelist
- Alonso Vázquez (155?–1615)
- Manuel Vázquez Montalbán (1939–2003), writer
- Garcilaso de la Vega (1501–1536), Renaissance poet who was influential in introducing Italian Renaissance verse forms, poetic techniques, and themes to Spain
- "El Inca" Garcilaso de la Vega (1539–1616), first mestizo author in Spanish language, known for his chronicles of Inca history
- Félix Lope de Vega (1562–1635), one of the key literary figures of the Spanish Golden Age
- José Miguel Vilar-Bou (born 1979), short story writer and novelist

== X ==
- Ester Xargay Melero (1960-2024), poet, video artist, translator and cultural agitator

== Y-Z ==
- Tomás Yerro (1951 - 2021), writer, academic, and literary critic.
- Josep Yxart (1852–1895), writer and translator
- Pedro Zarraluki (1954–2025), writer
- María de Zayas y Sotomayor (1590–1660), female novelist of the Spanish Golden Age, and one of the first Spanish feminist authors
- Asunción de Zea-Bermúdez (1862–1936), writer and essayist
- José Zorrilla y Moral (1817–1893), poet and dramatist, author of Don Juan Tenorio (1844)
- Juan Antonio de Zunzunegui (1901 - 1982), novelist and short story writer

== See also ==
- List of Spanish women writers
- List of Spanish-language authors
- List of Spaniards
