= Narciso Serra =

Spanish poet and dramatist

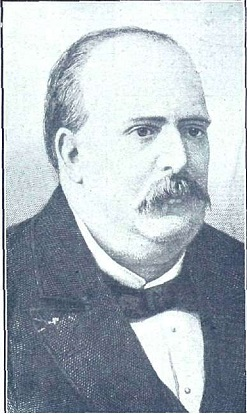
- Born: Narciso Saénz Díez Serra; 24 February 1830; Madrid, Spain
- Died: 26 September 1877 (aged 47); Madrid, Spain
- Occupations: Poet, Dramatist

Narciso Serra (24 February 1830 - 26 September 1877) was a Spanish poet and dramatist.

== Life ==
Narciso Saénz Díez Serra was born in Madrid. According to his birth registration he was the son of the businessman Alejandro Saénz Díez and his future wife, Carlota María Petra Serra Ortega. His paternity is widely ascribed to the soldier-writer Antonio Ros de Olano, however. After he grew up Narciso Serra decided to dispense with his paternal surname which, under Spanish naming conventions, would otherwise have been included as part of his own full name.

He published his first comedy, "Mi mamá" ("My Mum") in 1848. The play had its stage premier the same year and achieved success with audiences, although Serra did not succeed in establishing his own theatre company. It was also in 1848 that he published a volume of lyric poetry. As a young man he served in the army, ending up as a cavalry officer.

Serra participated in the Spanish Revolution of 1854 joining the generals Dulce, Ros de Olano and O'Donnell on 28 June 1854. He was wounded in the action against royalist troops at Vicálvaro. Subsequently, during the years of uneasy truce between the parties that began in 1856, he was rewarded by Queen Isabela II with a military promotion. The next year he was made a "Knight of Isabella the Catholic". In 1859, having reached the rank of a cavalry officer, he applied for and was granted an absolute discharge from the army. The cause was a progressive paralysis, attributed in some sources to a "brain ailment" ("dolencia de cerebro").

The circle of his theatrical friends included Juan Eugenio Hartzenbusch, Julián Romea and Francisco Camprodón. As a young man he became known for a somewhat "Bohemian" lifestyle, known as a reveller with a weakness for women and gambling.

In November 1861 he suffered an attack of Hemiparesis, apparently in the context of some degenerative condition, which left the left side of his body paralysed. Florencio Moreno Godino wrote in 1895 that "his whole body was paralysed except for the head and the right arm" ("quedóse paralítico de todo el cuerpo, excepción hecha de la cabeza y del brazo derecho"). He was confined to a wheel chair. None of this prevented him from continuing to publish, however.

He now entered government service, obtaining a ministry job. In 1864 he was elected to the position of theatre censor, a post from which he resigned in November 1866. He was reappointed in January 1867 and continued in post till censorship was abolished as part of the "Glorious Revolution" in 1868.

Serra's financial situation deteriorated after 1868 and he died in relative poverty on 26 September 1877. His funeral took place at Madrid's Sacramental de Santa María (cemetery) during a day of heavy rain. Madrileños in attendance from the world of the arts included José Zorrilla, Ramón de Campoamor y Campoosorio, José Echegaray, Cecilia Francisca Josefa Böhl de Faber (Fernán Caballero) and Eusebio Blasco.

On 24 February 1878 the city council named a street after him, the "calle de Narciso Serra", in Madrid's Pacífico quarter.

== Works ==
Evaluated in the context of the Alta comedia tradition, which peaked during the third quarter of the nineteenth century, at least one commentator believes that Serra is among those who have been "unjustifiably forgotten", although while he was alive, at the height of his career, he enjoyed prestige and success. He collaborated with writers such as Miguel Pastorfido and Salvador María Granés and also, between 1848 and 1854, trod the boards as an actor. His dramatic output received positive reviews from writers such as Juan Valera y Alcalá-Galiano and Francisco Miquel y Badía.

His plays include "La boda de Quevedo" ("The marriage of Quevedo") and "Don Tomás o El loco de la guardilla" (loosely "Don Thomas or the crazy guardsman").
