= Prohens =

Prohens is a surname from the island of Mallorca, Spain. Notable people with the surname include:

- Dylan Prohens (born 2007), unknown
- James Prohens (1911–2007), Spanish priest and poet
- Marga Prohens (born 1982), Spanish politician
- Rafael Prohens (born 1955), Chilean politician
