= Portilla (disambiguation) =

Portilla is a municipality located in the province of Cuenca, Castile-La Mancha, Spain

Portilla is also surname. Notable people with the surname include:

- Alex Diaz de la Portilla (born 1964), Cuban-American politician and member of the Republican Party
- Álvaro Portilla Suárez (born 1986), Spanish football player
- Cristian Portilla (born 1988), Spanish football player
- Giuliano Portilla (born 1972), Peruvian retired football player
- Jose Portilla (born 1972), Mexican player of American football
- Micaela Portilla (1922–2005), Spanish anthropologist
- Miguel Diaz de la Portilla (born 1963), Republican member of the Florida Senate
- Miguel de Portilla y Esquivel (1660–1732), Spanish writer
- Miguel León-Portilla (1926–2019), Mexican anthropologist and historian
- Pablo de la Portillà (19th century), soldier and pioneer in California
- Pedro de la Portilla (18th century), Criollo rebel in New Spain against the Spanish

== See also ==
- Portillo (disambiguation)
