= Agustín Millares Sall =

Spanish poet

- Born: 30 June 1917; Las Palmas de Gran Canaria, Canary Islands, Spain
- Died: 6 March 1989 (aged 71); Las Palmas de Gran Canaria, Canary Islands, Spain
- Occupations: Poet and writer
- Writing career
- Genre: Poetry

Agustín Millares Sall (1917–1989) was a Spanish poet who was part of the social poetry and realistic poetry movements. He is one of the poets who are considered precursors of these movements which appeared after World War II.

== Biography ==
Agustin Millares Sall was born on 30 June 1917 in Las Palmas de Gran Canaria. From a young age, he was involved in local culture. This was due to his father being poet Juan Millares Carlo, and his brothers being painters Manolo Millares and Eduardo Millares, poet Jose Maris Millares Sall and timple player Toyoto Millares. He also had a sister, Jane Millares Sall who was also a painter.

In high school, Agustin Millares Sall had writer Agustin Espinosa as a teacher. Agustin Espinosa inspired him to travel to Madrid to study Philosophy and literature, but due to the Spanish Civil War he was unable to continue his studies.

During the 1930s, the completely self-taught poet joined the progressive movement in Spain. He published his first poem, El barco muerto in 1929, in the socialist newspaper La Voz Obrera. In 1932, Agustin Millares Sall affiliated himself with the Communist Party of Spain. This political affiliation created problems for him during the Spanish Civil War when he was sent to a concentration camp and in 1938 exiled to Lanzarote.

In 1941, he was employed by the Compañía Transmediterránea, the company where he would be employed until his retirement. There he would meet Juan Manuel Trujillo, who helped him publish his first book of poetry.

He died in Las Palmas de Gran Canaria on 6 March 1989.
