= Rossend Marsol Clua =

Rossend Marsol Clua, known by his pen name Sícoris, (Artesa de Segre, 22 October 1922 – Andorra la Vella, 17 January 2006) was an Andorran lawyer, journalist and writer of Spanish origin.

== Biography ==
He studied law at the University of Barcelona and worked as a press correspondent through the 1940s and 1950s, until he was forced into exile in Andorra for his opposition to Francoism and his support of Catalanism. He later became a correspondent for the newspapers La Mañana (1959–1990) and La Vanguardia (1965–1978), among other publications, and also worked for El Mundo Deportivo and El Noticiero Universal. In broadcasting, he worked for Radio Andorra and Ràdio Valira, presenting news and opinion programmes.

He was part of the revitalisation of the bear dances in Andorra, particularly in Encamp. He was the presenter of the Andorran Literature Night (Nit Literària Andorrana) from its creation in 1978 until his death.

He was married to Conxita Riart, with whom he had three daughters.

== Books of poems ==
- Cel i muntanya, Les Escaldes 1989
- Festa major, Les Escaldes 2001
- La terra dels Valires, Andorra la Vella 2003
