= Diego Beltrán Hidalgo =

Spanish poet

Don Diego Beltrán Hidalgo was a seventeenth century Spanish Marrano poet. The son of a Jew from Murcia, he was noted as an editor and commentator of Spanish popular poetry. The following example of the rondelet is from his pen:

"O no mirar ó morir decis, pensamiento amando? mas vale morir mirando que no mirando vivir."
