= Gonçal Mayos Solsona =

Spanish philosopher, essayist and professor

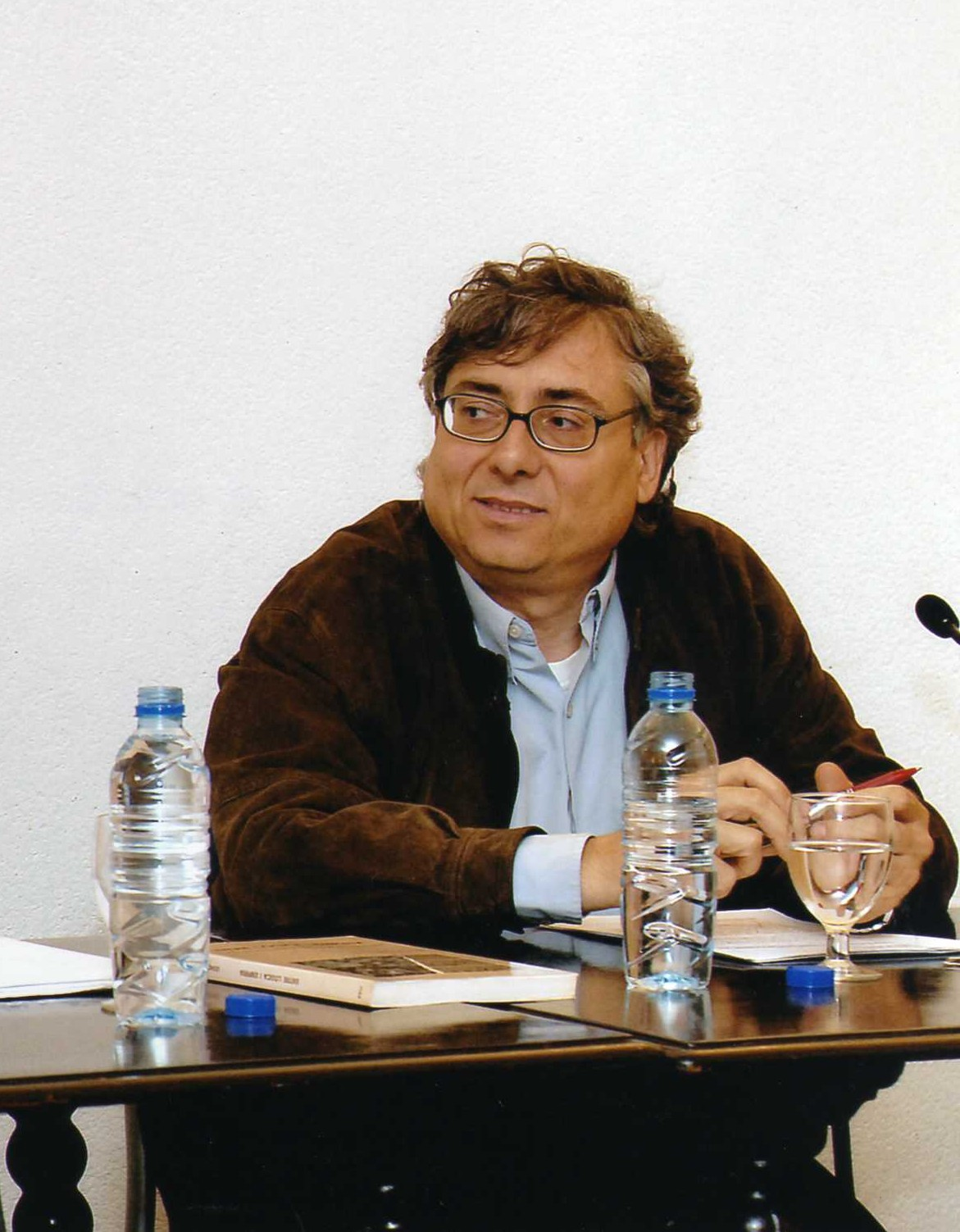
Gonçal Mayos.

Gonçal Mayos Solsona (born 1957) is a Spanish philosopher, essayist and professor at the University of Barcelona. Specialist by Nietzsche, Hegel, Herder, Kant, Descartes, D'Alembert..., has evolved into the study of great modern movements (rationalism, illustration, Romanticism, philosophy of suspicion) and its influence on contemporary Postmodernism. He chairs the Joan Maragall Liceu of Philosophy of Ateneu Barcelonès and directs the Open Network for Postdisciplinarity and Macrophilosophy (OPEN-PHI) and the Grup Internacional de Recerca 'Cultura, Història i Estat' (GIRCHE).

Mayos has cradled the term "macrophilosophy" ("macrofilosofía") to characterize his overall analysis, comparative, interdisciplinary and long-term processes in philosophical, epistemological, sociological and political fields. He has written numerous books and articles, for example: The Society of Ignorance (on the occasion of World Day d'Internet, 17.5.2009), A. Brey, D. Innerarity and G. Mayos, foreword by E. Carbonell. Edited by www.infonomia.com. Free Download www.theignorancesociety.com (available in English, Spanish and Catalan).
