= Fernando Rodríguez Méndez =

Spanish journalist and writer

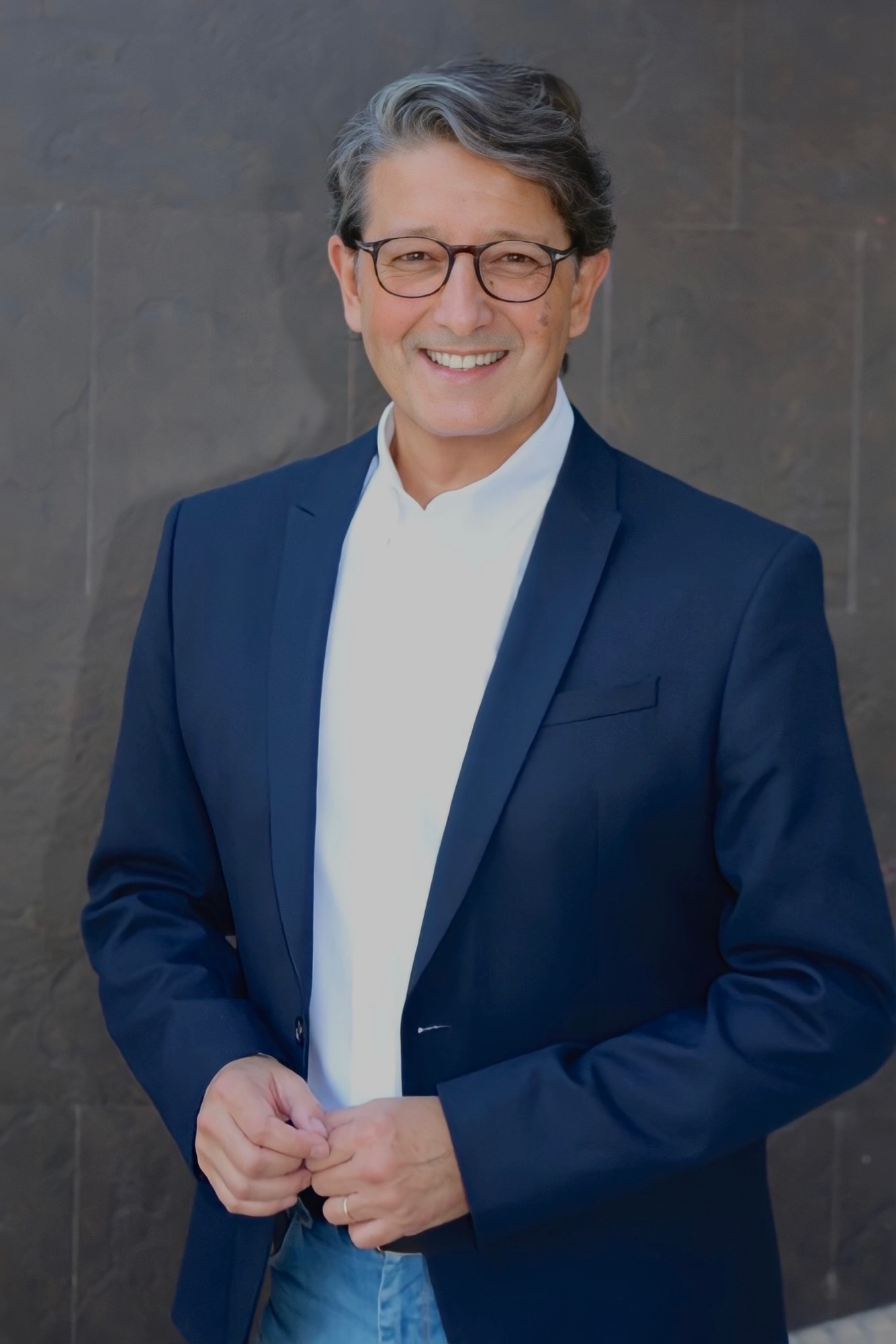
Fernando Méndez - Periodista y escritor

Fernando Rodríguez Méndez is a Spanish journalist and writer. He has worked for the newspapers Faro de Vigo and La Región, and at Galician Television. He has written for El Observador, Cambio 16, Interviu, Tiempo, and Radio Nacional. He was press officer and director of Communication in institutions of Galicia. He is a member of Federation of Associations of Journalists of Spain (FAPE).

Méndez is one of the most awarded journalists on drug dependency in the country. He was awarded prestigious prizes such as the Reina Sofía Journalism Prize (twice) and the Prize Xunta de Galicia on drug dependency. In 2013, he won the Ana María Agüero Melnyczuk investigation journalism award with his coverage of the “Methyl Case” in Argentina.

== Bibliography ==
- Voz e voto (Voice and vote) (1991) collective book
- Mil muertos de un trago (A thousand dead in one gulp) (1998)
- Historia dun crime. O caso do Metílico (History of a crime. The case of the Methyl) (1998)
- Deus xogando aos dados (God playing dices) (2010)
- La noche y los guerreros de fuego (The night and the fire Warriors) (2011) collective book
- Metílico. 50 años envenenados. (Methyl. 50 years poisoned) (2013)
- Cuatro esquinitas tiene mi cama (The four little corners of my bed) (2014)
- Nunca guardes las cosas rotas (Never keep broken things) (2014)
- Contos do Sacaúntos (Tales of the werewolf) (2016) collective book
- Los tiburones no comen pan (Sharks don't eat bread) (2023)
- La vida mientras luchamos (Life while we fight) (2024)
