= Pedro Víctor Debrigode Dugi =

Spanish novelist

Pedro Víctor Debrigode (1914–1982) was a Spanish novelist.

== Pseudonyms ==
He used a very wide range of pseudonyms, the most prominent was Peter Debry, but he also signed his works as PVDebrigaw, Arnold Briggs, Arnaldo Visconti, Geo Marvik, Peter Briggs, V. Debrigaw, and Vic Peterson.

== Imprisonment and Trial ==
Was enlisted in the ranks of the national side at the start of the Civil War, after seeking his transfer to Spain was involved in strange circumstances that led him to be charged with espionage. After being released for lack of evidence, he tried to go to France, but failed again, being arrested on charges including espionage, dereliction of duty and misappropriation of funds. After passing through various criminal convictions, he finally was released in October 1945.
