= Manuel Martínez Barrionuevo =

Spanish poet, writer, and journalist

Manuel Martínez Barrionuevo (1857, Málaga – 5 January 1917) was a Spanish poet, writer, and journalist. Barrionuevo had a prolific career and contributed to the periodicals El Progreso, Bandera Liberal, and Diaro Mercantil, and wrote novels, plays, and poetry.
