= Eduardo Quiles =

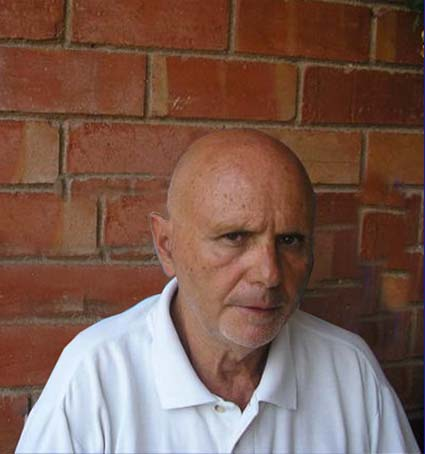
Eduardo Quiles

Eduardo Quiles (born 12 April 1940 in Valencia, Spain) is a playwright and writer.

== Biography ==
Quiles is the author of the novels Time Ashes (on the Spanish Civil War) and El carnaval del relajo, which reflects their experience in Latin America. Quiles lived in Mexico City from 1972 to 1975 where he taught screenwriting at the Latin American Institute for Educational Communication, wrote Philip II, Freud and Trial of Don Quixote to Televisa's Channel 8, practiced journalism and was drama critic of El Sol de Mexico.

In 1972 the BBC of London translated into English his work Insomnia. Since 1974, the American magazine Modern International Drama in English began broadcasting eight of his most significant dramas. The State University of New York premiered his play The Employee. Quiles in 1980 founded the theater company Escena Uno and traveled in Europe and the United States, directing his works and lecturing on his The Character's Teatre. In New York offered The Refrigerator (1987) The Bridal Chamber (1989), A Ophelia without Hamlet (1997), Elsa's Goodbye (1996-1997), produced in Multi-Here Arts Center in Manhattan. In 1999 he traveled again to New York by The Miranda Theatre invited to direct the opera Elsa's Goodbye based on theater piece and in turn being the author of the libretto. That same year he premiered A Ophelia without Hamlet in Berlin as a guest work under the German Hispanists Congress where Quiles gave a lecture at the University of Berlin.

Subsequently, he released in Germany in German-Spanish bilingual edition works The razor, The Refrigerator and Elsa's Goodbye. In 2001 his book The Character's Teatre (selected works) was published in Madrid by the Association of Authors' Theatre. The Marquise of Havana was again published by the Institution Valencia Alfons the Magnanimous Library.

== Art Teatral ==
In 1987, Quiles founded the magazine Art Teatral, which specializes in contemporary theatrical writing.

Art Teatral promotes the diffusion of contemporary dramatic authors by means of publication of their short plays, whose knowledge provides an overview of modern theatrical writing. On average, it publishes ten short dramatic illustrated plays in each issue. Every issue includes, moreover, an updated bibliography of all participant authors and half a dozen of essays about the importance of brief genres in theater history and in each author's theatrical work. Art Teatral has an anthological collectable nature. So far, general issues, monographic issues about Valencian and other Autonomous Regions, and about French, Italian, Portuguese, American and Latin American dramatists, have been published: 200 short plays altogether, including monologues, and a fair amount of essays.

== Work ==
One characteristic of Quiles is his variety of records: theater, novels, short story, youth fiction, libretto of opera, poetry, radio scripts, TV. film and journalism. Even in a piece of theatrical creativity as the minipieza, Quiles has many titles, being The wonderful manipulator a true reflection of the minimalist principle that less is more, perceived as a research laboratory where the microcosm brings together basic elements of theater architecture written: idea, story, character, conflict, drama. Dramas in miniature, dramatic synthesis as defined by the author himself, which is why in 1987 founded a magazine in that direction as Art Teatral. Also, his passion for the short work opened the roads of the short story, and here his story could include A clarinetist in the Gothic Quarter and The dreams coffee awarded in Buenos Aires in 2009.

Regarding his play, it becomes a conjunction, a synthesis of classical drama and language of art and where the Quiles theater pillar is the creation of dramatic character, lesson drawn from the study of classics, especially of Greek tragedy and Elizabethan drama, in this case being obliged to cite the influence of Sophocles and Shakespeare. That two Quiles plays are for Antigone in his role and Ofelia without Hamlet, as pointed out by some scholars of his work, is more than a stunt by chance. On the other hand, if he devoted himself to cultivate various kinds of narrative and theater was because of his idea of the integral writer. From a young age I realized, Quiles say that the playwright has only one tool for creating plays: the dialogue. So theatrical practice leads to mastery of dialogue, but not of the narrative that is a matter of novelists. It would only be possible to control dialogue in depth and narrative if we write dramas, novels and stories at par. The road then was marked and I transit by both routes still searching for this utopia, perhaps unattainable, the integral writer.

=== Narrative ===
- El carnaval del relajo (1998).
- Time Ashes (2009).

Juvenile Fiction:

- The man who wanted to paint the black sun
- My aunt, the sorceress, and her computer

=== Theater ===
- The Character's Teatre, Selected Works (2001).
- El que robó a mi mujer
- Velada de alunados con tango final
- Wrath and ecstasy
- The Marquise of Havane
- The Refrigerator
- The Razor
- The Bridal Chamber
- The virtuoso of Times Square
- An Ophelia without a Hamlet

=== Opera ===
- Elsa's Goodbye (2002).

Trotapesquis (Premio Iberoamericano de Dramaturgia Infantil)
