= María del Carmen Reina Jiménez =

Spanish essayist, writer, activist and politician

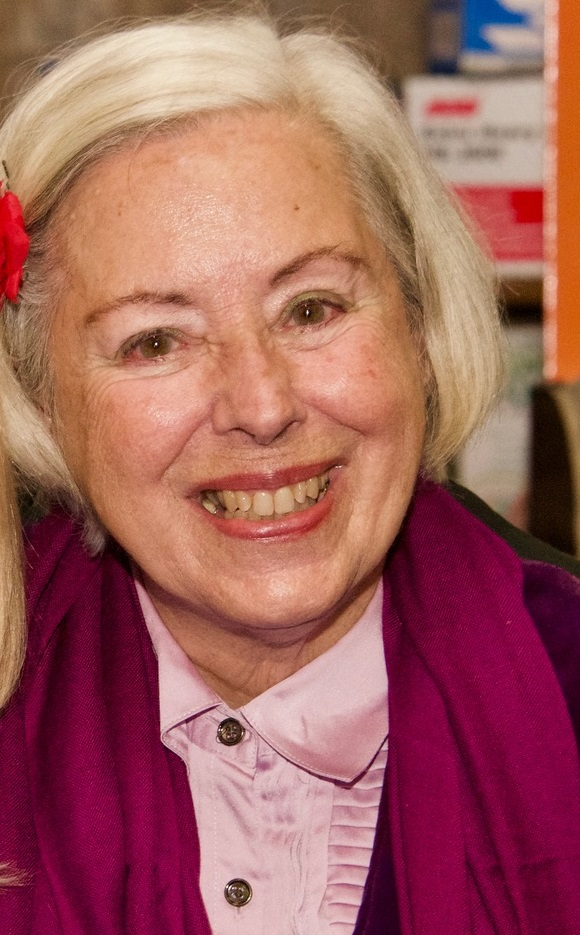
- (2020)
- Born: December 8, 1942 (age 83); Las Palmas, Spain
- Occupations: essayist; writer; activist; politician
- Writing career
- Pen name: Chicha Reina Jiménez
- Subject: Women

María del Carmen Reina Jiménez (known as Chicha Reina Jiménez; December 8, 1942) is a Spanish essayist, writer, activist, and politician.

== Career ==
Chicha Reina pursued her professional career as a teacher of preschool and primary grades, a role she combined with political activism as a councilwoman in the Santa Brígida City Council (Gran Canaria), a position she held from 1991 to 1999. As a researcher, her notable works focus on topics related to women and culture in the Canary Islands. In 2010, she published Mujeres y Cultura (Women and Culture), a research project that compiles the biographies of 98 Canarian women distinguished for their contributions in fields such as music and dance, sculpture and ceramics, painting, literature, and design.

In March 2018, she presented Mujeres en la isla (Women on the Island) at the Casa de Colón in Las Palmas de Gran Canaria, a compilation and research work related to the magazine Mujeres en la isla, a publication entirely authored by women that was published in Gran Canaria between November 1953 and December 1964. The magazine included the participation of Canarian poets such as Pino Ojeda, Chona Madera, Josefina de la Torre, and Natalia Sosa Ayala, as well as the writer Carmen Conde. Reina presented this work on the island of Lanzarote in July 2018, and in Gáldar (Gran Canaria) as part of the literary talk "El Ultílogo" in January 2020. Two months later, again at the Casa Colón, Reina presented the book Antología de 100 escritoras canarias (Anthology of 100 Canarian Female Writers), which features the biographies of 112 women authors from the Canary Islands, along with samples of their works.

== Awards and honours ==
- 2015, Equality Award for "her work in favor of equality", by La Agrupación Socialista de Telde (Gran Canaria)
- 2016, Profesora Igualitaria Award "for her efforts to eliminate sexist and discriminatory practices in classrooms, for criticizing androcentrism in the curriculum in schools, and for her efforts to contribute to building more equal communities and societies", by the Santa Brígida City Council
- 2021, "Espacio feminista Chicha Reina" (Chicha Reina Feminist Space), at the Socialist Youth of Gran Canaria headquarters, in recognition of Reina's work for equality

== Selected works ==
- 2010, Mujer y cultura en Canarias, Gobierno de Canarias. ISBN 978-84-616-4659-3
- 2018, Mujeres en la isla (1953-1964). Editorial Mercurio. ISBN 978-84-948360-1-5
- 2020, Antología de 100 escritoras canarias. Editorial Mercurio. ISBN 978-84-17890-69-8
- 2021, La genética y yo, Beginbook Ediciones, ISBN 978-84-18588-62-4
- 2021, Natalia Sosa Ayala y mujeres en la isla. Editorial Mercurio. ISBN 978-84-18588-52-5
- 2022, Las poetas en Mujeres en la Isla, Editorial Mercurio. ISBN 978-84-125117-1-0
- 2023, El barítono, el pintor y su familia. La saga de la Torre. Beginbook Humanidades. ISBN 978-84-126560-1-5
- 2023, La traída del barro. Beginbook Ediciones. ISBN 9788412734669
