= Vicente Alberti y Vidal =

Spanish writer

Vicente Alberti y Vidal (1786 – 1859) was a Spanish writer. He wrote Diccionario de voces sagradas, técnicas, históricas y mitológicas in 10 volumes.
