= Francisco Cerecedo =

Spanish journalist

Francisco Cerecedo (1940–1977) was a Spanish journalist.
