= Manuel Siles Artés =

Spanish writer

- Born: January 9, 1921; Santa Fe de Mondújar, Almería
- Died: May 28, 1984 (aged 63)
- Occupation: Writer

Manuel Siles Artés (1921–1984) was a Spanish writer. He was born in Santa Fe de Mondújar. His archives were donated to the University of Almería in 2012.

== Selected works ==
- Las cuevas del cementerio (2003)
- Poli (1968), for which he won the 1968 Guipúzcoa Prize for short novels
