= José Manuel Mójica Legarre =

Spanish writer (born 1955)

José Manuel Mójica Legarre is a Spanish writer. He was born in September 1955, in Aragon, a province in Spain. According to some in the news-media, he is one of the “last adventurers”.

== Background and education ==
José Manuel is the only son of a humble family. He initiated his education under the auspices of a P.I.O (Equal Opportunities Scholarship) through High School. He was admitted to study art in the School of Arts in Zaragoza. He did not obtain a degree because he enlisted in the Spanish Air Force. He went through military parachute school and later enrolled in the Spanish Legion. A restless traveller, he studied Culinary Arts in France. He has worked, on and off, as a Chef in many countries. The contacts he made in France with the Roma, Manouche and Tsigane tribes greatly interested him and he decided to start a project about the Romas' laws that are orally passed unwritten from generation to generation. José Manuel has worked as: Chef; designer; composer; radio-commentator; writer-editor of the “El Informador”, a Santa Marta, Colombia newspaper; as a tourist-guide in the South American jungle, and many others.

== Wanderer, writer and chef ==
During his long stay in South America, he trekked the inner jungles of Colombia where he stayed with the Puinave tribes, (the Ant-men) and the Yanomami and Pemone tribes of the Venezuelan-Brazilian border region. What he learnt during his stay with these indigenous cultures with their uncontaminated moral and behavioural ethics, led him to compare norms and customs of cultures not integrated in what the first world would define as modern society. With new insight he finished his self-appointed project to compile a code of unwritten Romas laws. On his return to Europe he worked as a Chef de Cuisine in Spain and published his first book: “Gastronomía en tiempos de San Francisco Javier” (Gastronomy in the times of Saint Francis Xavier), ordered by Sociedad Cultural Baja Montaña/Mendi Behera, of Navarre, Spain. Subsequently, under the auspices of the Excelentísimo Ayuntamiento de Sos del Rey Católico, Zaragoza, Spain, he published a research book: “La Cocina Medieval en la Villa de Sos del Rey Católico” (Medieval Kitchen in the Villa of Sos del Rey Católico); this book was shortlisted (2nd) with regards to the “World Award Cookbook” –Gourmet Prize-, sponsored by Cointreau. Thereafter his interests wandered away again, and his research project of the Roma’s laws “La llama frente al huracán”, was published by Editorial AQUA, Zaragoza. This book, “The flame in front of the hurricane”, is more than a legal code; it is a code of ethics and conduct for Gipsy Patriarchs. In 2007 Editorial AQUA published “Con la Mirada de un dios cobarde” (Under the Sight of a Cowardly God) José Manuel wrote that the saga of a Roma Patriarch with Gipsy laws is compared to the law of Moses, present Judaism, Hinduism and Christian religions. The books “La llama frente al huracán” and “Con la mirada de un dios cobarde” were selected to represent Editorial AQUA in the Aragon government's stand at the Editor’s Book Fairs in Barcelona (Spain), Frankfurt (Germany) and Guadalajara (Mexico). In January 2008 Mr. Mójica Legarre, along with editor José Vela and José Rabassó, founded “Asociación Cultural el Tintero (the inkpot)”.

== Books ==
- La gastronomía en tiempos de San Francisco Javier; Baja Montaña-Mendi Behera, 2005.
- La Cocina Medieval en la Villa de Sos del Rey Católico; Ayuntamiento de Sos del Rey Católico, Zaragoza 2006.
- La llama frente al huracán. El testamento del patriarca; Edición: Aqua 2007.
- Con la mirada de un dios cobarde; Edición: Aqua 2007.
- Cocina Medieval y Renacentista; Edición: Aqua 2008.
- 6 años con el diablo ; Edición: Aqua 2008.
- FRASCUELO.; Edición: Aqua 2009. Second edition March 2009.
- Radiografía de un delirio; Edición: Aqua 2010.
- Recettes de cuisine a travers les ages; Edición: Aqua 2010.
