= Miguel de los Santos Álvarez =

Spanish writer

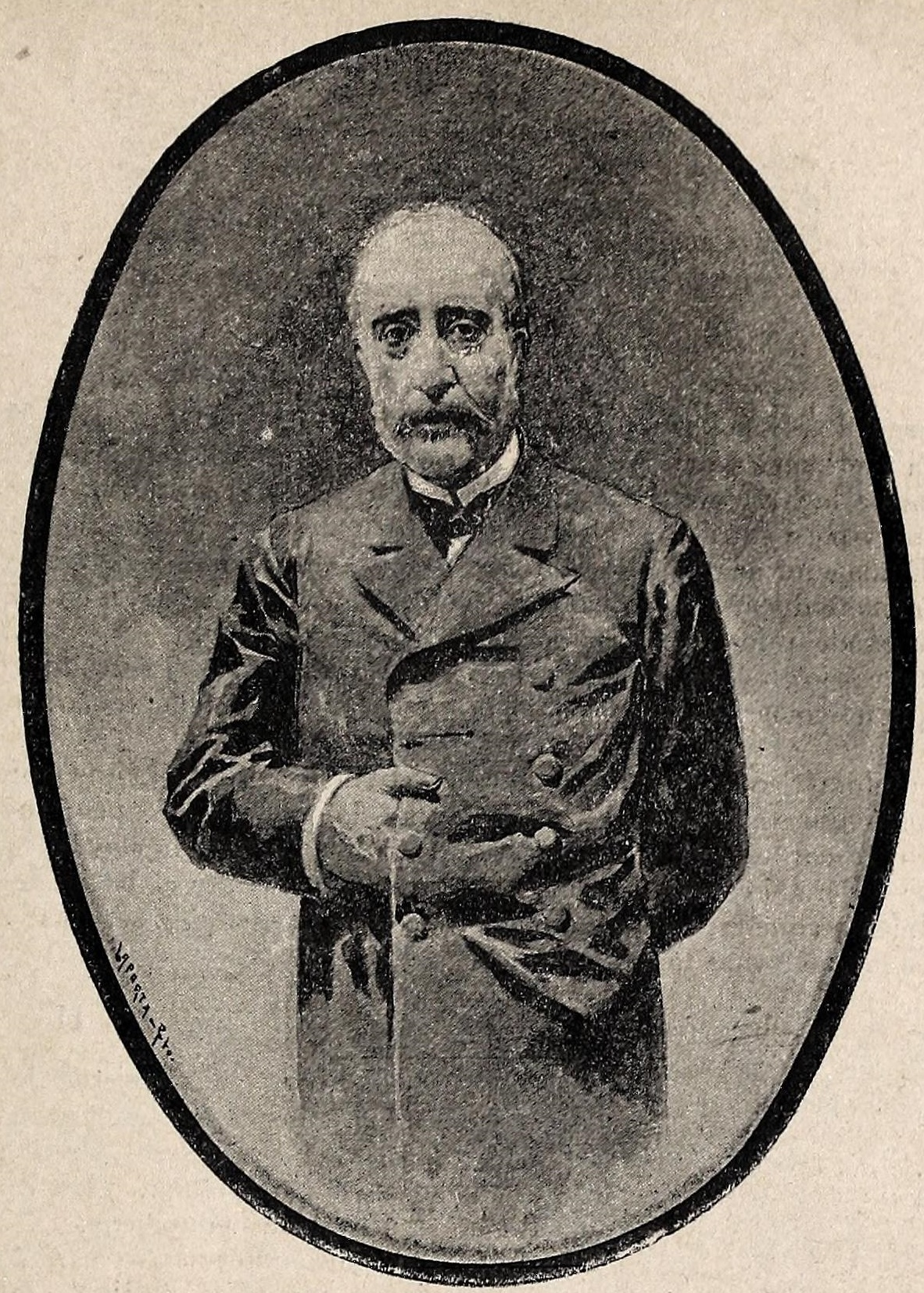
Engraving of Miguel de los Santos Álvarez

Miguel de los Santos Álvarez (1818–1892) was a Spanish writer and poet. He was a friend of José Zorrilla. He was involved in politics.
