= Iñigo Moré =

Spanish researcher and author (born 1968)

Iñigo Moré (born 1968) is a Spanish researcher and non-fiction writer focused on the meaning of globalization for many developing countries, that most times include economic inequality, migration, illicit financial flows and migrants' remittances. Moré has authored six written books, including The Borders of Inequality, that was considered as "one of the most anticipated books" of 2011 by the Huffington Post and an "important contribution to border studies". Moré considers that borders are "areas of discountinuity", and that they may exist independently of their political configuration. As geography creates "natural borders", economic inequality has also the capacity to create borders. Not only between nations, but also within them, as it happens between the richest and poorest neighbourhoods of the world's main cities.

His book La Vida en la Frontera was considered in Spain the 6th best non fiction book of the year 2007 by El Cultural, the books supplement of the newspaper El Mundo.

Iñigo More's specialization led him to be the sole Spanish writer invited in 2012 to the 10th anniversary National Latino Writers Conference organized by the National Hispanic Cultural Centre in Albuquerque.

In his professional life, Moré is an expert in payment systems. He is the founder of the research centre Remesas. that specializes in studying remittances. In this capacity he is member of the Payment systems Market Expert Group that advises the European Commission on its payments systems policy, and serves as a member of the Spanish Chapter of the Club of Rome and member of the Economic and Financial Control Commission of CEDRO, the non-profit association of authors and publishers that is in charge of protecting and managing in a collective manner their intellectual property rights.

Moré is married and the father of two children.

== Bibliography ==
- Moré, Iñigo (2011). The Borders of Inequality. University of Arizona Press. ISBN 978-0816529322.
- Moré, Iñigo, ed. (2010). La crisis de la remesas : retos y oportunidades. Madrid: Remesas. ISBN 978-84-605-9278-5.
- Moré, Iñigo, ed. (2009). Inmigración y remesas informales en España. Madrid: Ministerio de Trabajo y Asuntos Sociales. ISBN 978-84-614-2225-8.
- Moré, Iñigo (2007). La vida en la frontera. Ediciones Jurídicas y Sociales. Madrid: Marcial Pons. ISBN 978-84-8417-346-5.
- Moré, Iñigo (2006). Las remesas de los emigrantes desde España a Iberoamérica. Madrid. ISBN 978-84-9768-418-7.
- Moré, Iñigo (1999). Cuba, nuevas perspectivas tras el entendimiento sobre la ley Helms-Burton. Madrid. ISBN 978-84-605-9278-5.
