= Augusto Martínez Olmedilla =

Spanish writer and journalist

Augusto Martínez Olmedilla (1880 – 26 September 1965) was a Spanish writer and journalist.

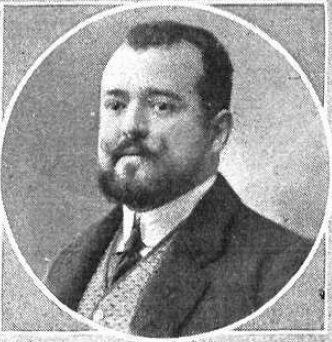
Augusto Martínez Olmedilla

Olmedilla was born in Madrid. A prolific writer, he contributed to periodicals including Blanco y Negro, La Esfera and Nuevo Mundo and was the author of over 30 novels, over 70 short novels and some 40 plays.

As an essayist, the work for which he has been remembered was his amusing study Los teatros de Madrid: anecdotario de la farándula madrileña, published in 1948, which won the Madrid City Council award.
