= Jerónimo de Arbolanche =

Spanish writer

Jerónimo de Arbolanche (1546–1572) was a Spanish writer. He is best known for his only published work, Las Abidas (1566), a long narrative poem combining mythological, pastoral, and chivalric elements. Although largely overlooked today, Arbolanche was part of the literary landscape during the Spanish Golden Age.

== Early life and education ==
Arbolanche was born in Tudela around 1546, into a wealthy merchant family. His father was Pedro de Bilbao and his mother, María Vitas. He studied grammar with Melchor Enrico and was involved in literary gatherings at the Palacio de San Adrián, hosted by the Marqués Pedro de Magallón.

== Literary career ==
Arbolanche's primary contribution to literature is Las Abidas, published in Zaragoza in 1566. The poem spans over 11,000 lines, mostly written in blank hendecasyllables, and is divided into nine books. It retells the legend of Abido (or Habis), a Turdetanian mythological figure described by Trogo Pompeyo.

Las Abidas is notable for its eclectic literary structure, incorporating elements of classical mythology, courtly love, and allegory. Scholars view his poetic style as an early example of what would later develop into culteranismo, characterized by dense classical references and ornate language.

== Personal life ==
In 1571, Arbolanche married Graciosa de Cascante and entered a business partnership with his father-in-law, Jaime de Cascante. He lived his entire life in Tudela and died in 1572 at the young age of 26.

== Reception and legacy ==
Despite its literary ambition, Las Abidas was not well received by all contemporaries. Miguel de Cervantes mocked Arbolanche in Viaje del Parnaso, portraying him as a leader of mediocre poets and ridiculing the poem for its verbosity and confusing style. Nevertheless, Las Abidas has since gained attention from scholars as an important work reflecting the transition from Renaissance to Baroque literary forms in Spain.

== See also ==
- Spanish Golden Age#Literature
- Epic poetry
- Miguel de Cervantes
- Culteranismo
