= Pedro Malón de Chaide =

Spanish writer and priest

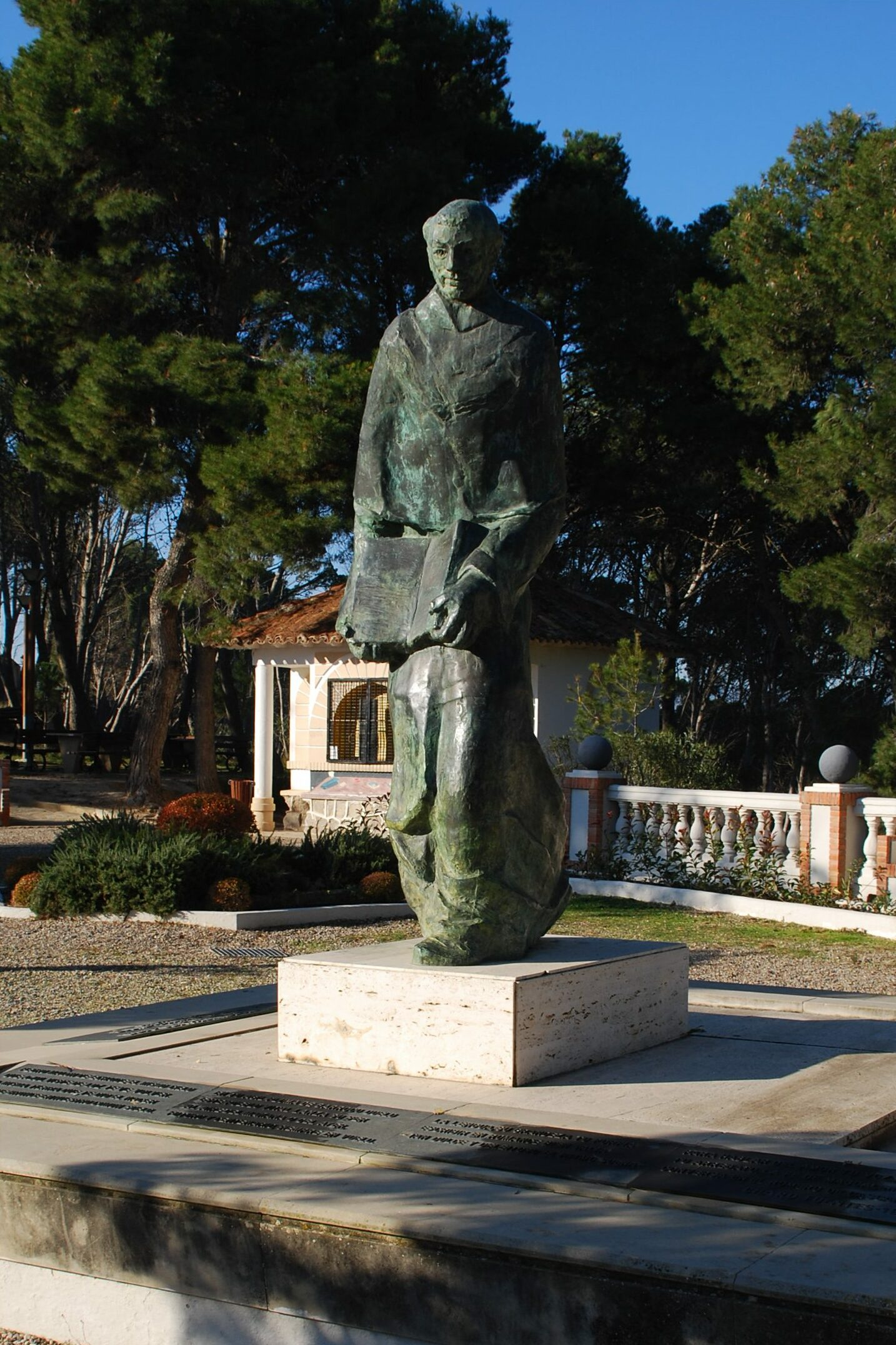

Pedro Malón de Chaide (1530–1589) was a Spanish religious writer whose works resemble literature from the Renaissance era.

== Biography ==
Pedro Malón de Chaide was born in Cascante, Navarra c. 1530. His father and brother were notaries in Cascante. He went to Salamanca to study letters, but entered the convent of the Augustinians of Cascante and afterwards professed solemn vows on October 27, 1557. In university, he was a disciple of Fray Luis de Leon and Fr. Juan de Guevara, which influenced him deeply. He later lived in Burgos from 1569 to 1572 when, in 1572, the Inquisition took hold of the Augustinian biblical scholar Alonso Gudiel, professor at the University of Osuna, in Valladolid. He designed a thesis in Latin to support the Incarnation of Christ in the chapter that the Augustinian province of Castile celebrated there, although Malón declared that he had composed them. The Inquisition, which had received the accusations against him and Gaspar de Grajal of the Hellenist Leon de Castro, an enemy not only of Friar Luis de Leon but of all his friends, considered them heretical; Gudiel died in prison a few months later without clarifying the matter, which impressed strongly to Malón de Chaide, in view of the difficulties that had also suffered his master Fray Luis, and is attributed to this incident the reluctance to publish his works, of which two were unpublished, and the fact that it passed by order of its superiors from the province of Castile to the one of Aragon to prevent future evils. He was, therefore, in the convent of Saragossa, where he was prior (1575-1577), and in Huesca (1578-1583), also of prior; In this stay, he began to compose his works. At the University of Huesca he got his doctorate in theology in 1581. In 1582 he was appointed teacher of the Augustinian Order and in 1583, being the definitor of the province, he was appointed professor in Zaragoza; There he treated the great humanist manchego Pedro Simón Abril. He took part in the foundation of the monastery of Our Lady of Loreto, in Huesca, in 1585. He was prior of the convent of Barcelona; In 1588 he published his only printed book, The Conversion of the Magdalene. He died in the same Barcelona in 1589.
