= Francisco de Paula López de Castro =

Spanish poet and writer

Francisco de Paula López de Castro (1771–1827) was a Spanish Neoclassic poet and writer.
