= Saulo Torón Navarro =

Spanish poet

Saulo Torón Navarro (June 28, 1885 – January 23, 1974), known as Saulo Torón, was a Spanish poet from the Canary Islands. His collections include Las Monedas de Cobre (1919), Canciones en la orilla (1932), and Frente al muro (1963).

== Life ==
Saulo Torón was born in Telde on 24 June 1885. Alongside writing and publishing poetry, he worked as a custom officer in Las Palmas de Gran Canaria for many years. He was married to the singer Isabel Macario Brito; the couple had two children, Saulo and María Isabel. He died in Las Palmas de Gran Canaria on 23 January 1974.

The house where he was born is now a museum celebrating his life and work. A bust of Saulo Torón by the sculptor Juan Jaén was erected in Las Palmas de Gran Canaria in 1982.

== Writing career ==
Saulo Torón began publishing poetry in Canarian newspapers and magazines in the 1910s. He published his first collection, Las Monedas de Cobre, in 1919, with a cover designed by his close friend, poet Tomás Morales. In 1926 he published his second collection, El caracol encantado, which included a preface by Antonio Machado, and was dedicated to Morales who had died in 1921, at the age of 37. Saulo Torón published a third collection, Canciones en la orilla in 1932. He continued to publish further collections, including Cotidianidad (1944) and Lejanías (1949), up until Frente al muro in 1963. In 1970, he published a collected volume, Poesías.

Early in his career, Saulo Torón also wrote three plays, Duelo y jolgorio, La familia de Don Pancho, sus tertulias y el inglés and La última de Frascorrita.

After his death, some of his uncollected works were published in Poesías satíricas (1976), which also includes works by Morales. In 2024, twelve interviews with Saulo Torón, carried out in 1966, were published as Conversaciones noveladas. A collected volume of his poetry, Poesía completa, was published in 1988, followed by Obra completa in 2016, which brings together all his poetry, plays, and prose.

Saulo Torón, Tomás Morales, and Alonso Quesada were key figures in twentieth-century Canarian poetry, making up the "Generación de los Tres" or "Generation of the Three". Together with other poets such as Fernando González, Montiano Placeres, Hilda Zudán, and Saulo Torón's brother Julián Torón, they are seen as representing an insular version of modernism, sometimes known as the "Escuela Lírica de Telde" or "Telde lyrical school".
