= Andrés Pascual =

Spanish writer, public speaker and lawyer

Andrés Pascual Carrillo de Albornoz (born 1969 in Logroño, La Rioja, Spain) is a Spanish writer, public speaker, and lawyer. He is also a classically trained pianist and composer, and a past member of several rock bands. He currently resides between London and Spain.

== Biography ==
Andrés Pascual was born in Logroño, La Rioja, Spain, in 1969. He studied law at the University of Navarra and has practiced as a solicitor since 1992. He has published six novels, which have sold hundreds of thousands of copies in several languages, and has spoken at conferences.

Pascual has visited fifty countries across four continents, including Syria, Lebanon, Ethiopia, Botswana, Namibia, Madagascar, Myanmar, Nepal, Tibet, India, Vietnam, Peru, Ecuador, and Indonesia, among others. He keeps a photographic record of his travels, which he shares on his website and social media.

Pascual is a music lover and has played with several rock bands as a singer and pianist. He also presented a Travel and Literature program on Punto Radio.

== Literary career ==
- *El guardián de la flor de loto* (*The keeper of the lotus flower*) (2007), his first novel, has sold more than 150,000 copies and has been translated into Italian, Portuguese, Russian, and Bulgarian. An independent film producer based in Los Angeles has produced a film score adaptation of the novel.
- *El compositor de tormentas* (*The storm-maker*) (2009), his second novel, was shortlisted for the VIII Premio de Novela Ciudad de Torrevieja.
- *El haiku de las palabras perdidas* (*The haiku of the lost words*) (2013) sold around 75,000 copies in Spain and was chosen by RNE (Spanish National Radio) listeners as one of the 25 most beautiful novels they have read, from nearly 1,000 works selected by the literary programme “El ojo crítico”.
- *El sol brilla por la noche en Cachemira* (*The sun shines at night in Kashmir*) was published by Editorial Planeta in 2012. This novel explores themes of personal development and life inspiration and, together with his travel experiences, forms the basis for his personal development conferences.
- *Edén* (*Eden*) (2014), is a thriller based in Brazil and has been translated into Portuguese.
- *Taj* (2016), a romantic tale woven around the construction of the Taj Mahal, won the Premio 2016 de Novela Histórica Alfonso X el Sabio (2016 Alfonso the Wise prize for Best Historical Novel), with a cash prize of EUR30,000. Following its publication, Andrés was named as one of the 10 most important writers of the year by the Spanish National newspaper ABC, alongside novelists including Eduardo Mendoza and Arturo Pérez-Reverte.
- *A merced de un dios salvaje* (*At the Mercy of a Savage God*) (2018), a psychological thriller based in La Rioja.

== Conferences and personal development ==
In addition to his novels, Pascual has published two non-fiction books focusing on personal development:

- *El viaje de tu vida* (*The journey of your life*) (2016)
- *El oso, el tigre y el dragón* (*The bear, the tiger and the dragon*) (2017; jointly with Ecequiel Barricart).

Pascual presents conferences on personal development as part of a team of conference speakers associated with the BCC Speakers International Bureau agency, which has offices in Madrid, Mexico City, Bogotá, Buenos Aires, Vancouver, London, Lisbon, New York City, and Milan.

== Musical career ==
Pascual began his classical musical training at the age of seven, and at sixteen he won the First Fermín Gurbindo Prize for Musical Interpretation for performing a sonata by Mozart.

While still at law school at the University of Navarra in Pamplona, he joined Quinta Columna, a rock group which performed at over 100 concerts and national events. He later became a member of the group Catorce de Septiembre, with whom he recorded two records with Sony Music International on the EPIC label while completing his law degree. The band toured throughout Spain and performed at large events including Expo 92 in Seville, winning the RNE (Spanish National Radio) Radio3 award for Best Emerging Band in 1992. For the past two decades, he has been covering rock hits with his band Animalversion.

== Publications ==
Novels

- *El guardián de la flor de loto* – *The keeper of the lotus flower* (Plaza Janés) 2007
- *El compositor de tormentas* – *The storm-maker* (Plaza Janés) 2009
- *El haiku de las palabras perdidas* – *The haiku of the lost words* (Plaza Janés) 2011
- *El sol brilla por la noche en Cachemira* -*The sun shines at night in Kashmir* (Planeta) 2012
- *Edén* – *Eden* (Plaza Janés) 2014
- *Taj* (Espasa) 2016
- *A merced de un dios salvaje* -*At the Mercy of a Savage God* (Espasa) 2018

Non-fiction

- *El viaje de tu vida* – *The journey of your life* (Plaza Janés) 2016
- *El oso, el tigre y el dragón* – *The bear, the tiger & the dragon*, jointly with Ecequiel Barricart (Urano) 2017

== Prizes ==
- Premio de Novela Histórica Alfonso X el Sabio – Alfonso the Wise prize for Best Historical Novel (2016) for *Taj*.
- Premio Urano de Crecimiento Personal – Urano Prize for Personal Development (2017) jointly with Ecequiel Barricart for *El oso, el tigre y el dragón* – *The bear, the tiger & the dragon*.
