= Francisco Antonio de Monteser =

Spanish dramatist

Francisco Antonio de Monteser (c. 1620–1668) was a dramatist of the Spanish Golden Age. He was born in Seville and died in Madrid.
