= Juan Givanel Mas =

Spanish philologist, erudite, literary critic and Cervantes scholar

Juan Givanel Mas y Gaziel (Joan Givanel i Mas; 1868–1946) was a Spanish philologist, erudite, literary critic and scholar of Miguel de Cervantes. He was the curator of the Cervantes collection at the Biblioteca Central de Barcelona from 1914 until his death.

== Selected works ==
- Givanel Mas, Juan (1941). Catálogo de la Colección Cervantina [Catalogue of the Cervantes Collection]. Barcelona: Provincial Deputation of Barcelona. Volumes
  - 1
  - 2
  - 3
  - 4
- Givanel Mas, Juan (1946). Historia gráfica de Cervantes y del Quijote [A graphic history of Cervantes and Don Quixote]. Madrid: Editorial Plus-Ultra.
