= Francisco de Enciso Zárate =

Spanish writer

Francisco de Enciso Zárate was a Spanish writer. Born in Logroño, he was the son of a noble family fallen on hard times. He served as secretary to Don Pedro Álvarez Osorio, Marquess of Astorga. In 1532, while living in Valladolid, he wrote and published the first volume (consisting of three parts) of the chivalric romance Florambel de Lucea. The second volume (containing parts four and five) was published in Seville in 1548. The next year, he completed a manuscript (still extant) of the third and final volume, but this was never published. His romances are examples of the genre satirized in Miguel de Cervantes' Don Quijote de la mancha. He died in 1570.

It is thought that Francisco de Enciso Zárate may also be the author of Platir, an anonymous romance first published in Valladolid in 1533.
