= Cabret =

Catalan translator

Jacob ben Judah Cabrit (alternatively spelled Cabret) was a Catalan translator active towards the end of the fourteenth century. He translated from Latin into Hebrew. His abridgement of Arnaldus de Villa Nova's De Judiciis Astronomiae or Capitula Astrologiae discusses the application of astrology to medicine. It was written in Barcelona in 1381, and the manuscript still exists.

The surname Cabret or Cabrit was carried by several people, including Jewish physician from Perpignan Isaac Cabrit (15th century) or military chieftain Guillem Cabrit, and is said to come from the Catalan cabrit (goat) or the Puig Cabrit mountain, in Roses, Catalonia.
