= Tomás de Añorbe y Corregel =

Spanish priest, playwright and poet

Tomás Añorbe y Corregel (Madrid, 1686 - id, 1741) was a Spanish priest, playwright and poet.

== Biography ==
He was chaplain of the Royal Convent of the Incarnation and spent his life in charity missions, which he combined with poetry (Bitterness of death and Christian thoughts, 1731) and, above all, theater. His theatrical work constitutes a fundamental link within late-Baroque theater, where it is placed next to playwrights such as José de Cañizares and Antonio de Zamora. Within the popular theater of the late seventeenth and early eighteenth centuries, he delved into the genres most acclaimed by the public at that time: comedy of saints, or more specifically, of sinful saints, with Princess, harlot and martyr, Santa Afra (1735), a piece that, like others of Vicente Camacho ( Harlot of Phenicia and happy Samaritan woman, Santa Eudoxia (1740) and Andrés Antonio Sánchez de Villamayor ( The strong woman, astonishment of the deserts, penitent and admirable Santa María Egipcíaca , 1728), attended more to the spectacular and, consequently, to the conscious deformation of the pious stories, than to matters of devotion, which sparked the censorship of the moralists, among them Gaspar Díaz in his famous Theological Consultation. In the field of mythological zarzuela, a spectacular genre par excellence in which eighteenth-century authors used classical references freely by virtue of comedy, Añorbe y Corregel tempted his chords in Jupiter and Dánae, a piece where classic myth is spiced up with numerous anachronisms and outside characters, such as the funny Mamurrias. His best-known work is the tragedy El Paulino (1740), imitation of Cinna by Pierre Corneille, even though the cover page claims it pompously to be a "new tragedy in French fashion, with all the rigor of art." The dramatic production of Añorbe includes some short pieces, such as Entremés del Mudo (1734) and Second Sainete, or The Matter of Casting Ladies and Galants (1734) and a bouquet of comedies ( Lovers of Salerno, 1739; Nullities of love , 1734, and La Segismunda , 1739, among others).

== Bibliography ==
- Javier Huerta, Emilio Peral, Héctor Urzaiz, Teatro español de la A a la Z. Madrid: Espasa-Calpe, 2005. (Javier Huerta, Emilio Peral, Héctor Urzaiz, Spanish Theater from A to Z . Madrid: Espasa-Calpe, 2005.")
