= Andrés del Corral =

Spanish writer and archaeologist

Andrés del Corral (1748–1818) was a Spanish writer and archeologist.
