= Juan Millé Giménez =

Spanish writer and academic

Juan Millé Giménez (1884 – 15 January 1945) was a Spanish writer.

He was born in Almería and died in Málaga.

He studied at the University of Granada. He taught literature at the University of Buenos Aires and the University of La Plata. He also taught at a school of commerce in Buenos Aires.

His scholarly notes and monographic works deal mostly with writers of the Spanish Golden Age and especially with three authors: Miguel de Cervantes, Lope de Vega and Luis de Góngora. Particularly notable are his Notes for a Bibliography of the Non-Dramatic Works of Lope de Vega and the edition, in collaboration with his sister Isabel, of the Complete Works of Luis de Góngora y Argote (Madrid: Aguilar, 1932, frequently reprinted later). He also published a critical edition of Estebanillo González in two volumes (Madrid: Espasa-Calpe, 1934).

Among his critical books are Lope, Góngora and the Origins of Culteranism (Madrid, Tip. de la Revista de Arch, Bibl. and Museums, 1924); On the Genesis of Don Quixote: Cervantes, Lope, Góngora, the General Romancero, the Interlude of Romances, etc. (Barcelona: Araluce, 1930); The Madmen and Don Quixote (Buenos Aires: Imp. Mercatali, 1920); Scholarly Miscellany I-IV (New York-Paris: Imprimerie Sainte Catherine, 1925); Studies on Spanish Literature (1928), Jáuregui and Lope (Santander: Tip. J. Martínez, 1926); The Horoscope of Lope de Vega, offprint of Humanities, volume XV, Buenos Aires: Imprenta y Casa Editora Coni, 1927.

He also occasionally wrote poetry: From Old Spain (Buenos Aires, 1923).
