= Pedro Luis Martínez Larriba =

Spanish playwright

Pedro Luis Martínez Larriba (born 27 April 1946) is a Spanish playwright. He won the 1986 Margarita Xirgu prize for his radio play ¿Hay alguien escuchando ahí? ('Is Anyone Out There Listening?' lit. 'Is there someone listening there?').

== Biography ==
He studied at the Ramiro de Maeztu Institute in Madrid and at the Universidad Laboral in Tarragona, and in those years he wrote his first dramatic work Los Equivocados. Then the poetic work Nadia, unpublished until now. During this period he also participated as an actor in Alfonso Sastre's La Sangre De Dios.

Later he studied medicine at the Complutense University of Madrid, specializing in Microbiology and Parasitology, to this period belong some of his best works: La Creación Silenciosa, expressionist drama finalist in the Tirso de Molina Award in 1968, the dramas Como En El Caso Presente, Viaje A Las Triacales, En La Tumba De Josam and ¿Hay Alguien Escuchando Ahí?, which later obtained in 1986 the Radiophonic Theater Award "Margarita Xirgu".
