= José Rafael Valles Calatrava =

Spanish diplomat (born 1957)

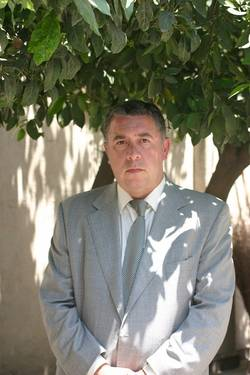
Dr. José R. Valles Calatrava is a distinguished member of several Andalusian writers' associations.

José Rafael Valles Calatrava (born 1957) is a Spanish researcher and professor of Literary Theory and Comparative Literature at the University of Almería. His interests lie in the fields of narratalogy, semiotics and crime fiction. He has published extensively on those fields and has written books such as Diccionario de teoría de la narrativa [Dictionary of Narrative Theory] and Teoría de la narrativa [Narrative Theory]. Valles Calatrava has taught at the University of Almería and the University of Granada since 1989.

He also has been involved in diplomatic work in Spain embassies in Mexico, Cuba, Peru, and Bolivia.

== University Involvement ==
At the university of Almería, Dr. Valles Calatrava has been vice secretary-general between 1993 and 1995, vice president of Academic Planning between 1995 and 1997 and he was a member of the Academic Committee for PhD Students in Humanities and Social Studies. Additionally, he became head of the Department of Art and Literature at the Instituto de Estudios Almerienses (1989-1993). Currently, Dr. Valles Calatrava leads the Theory of Literature and Comparative Literature research group. He is also member of several Andalusian writers' and critics' associations.

He has directed various doctoral theses, has given numerous lectures and courses in Spain and abroad, has conducted several research stays at foreign universities, particularly the UNAM, and has obtained several grants in Spain, both public and private, to undertake investigation projects. He has researched comprehensively on crime fiction, space and narrative character and theories of narrative and the historic development of these such theories. He is author of numerous scientific publications and has coordinated several academics works.

== Literary work ==
=== Books ===
- Teoría de la Narrativa. Una perspectiva sistemática. Iberoamericana-Vervuert (Madrid-Múnich, 2008). ISBN 978-84-8489-386-8.
- (ed. e introd.). Antonio Ledesma. La nueva salida del valeroso caballero Don Quijote de la Mancha. Fundación Unicaja (Málaga, 2005). ISBN 84-95979-28-4.
- con Valverde Velasco, Alicia. Vida y obra de Carmen de Burgos Seguí, "Colombine" Fudepa(Sevilla, 2005). ISBN 84-689-2330-3.
- (dir. y coautor). Diccionario de Teoría de la Narrativa. Alhulia (Granada, 2003). ISBN 84-95136-94-5.
- Suspense y novela. Estructura y efectos del suspense en El aire de un crimen de Juan Benet. Universidad Nacional Autónoma de México – Acatlán (Serie Alfonsina) (México DF, 2002).
- con Alamo Felices, Francisco. Fundamentos de semiótica narrativa. Universidad de Almería (Almería, 2000). ISBN 84-8240-360-5.
- con Davidenko, Marina. La crítica social-realista rusa, I. Belinski y Chernishevski. Universidad de Almería (Almería, 2000). ISBN 84-8240-249-8.
- con Davidenko, Marina. La crítica social-realista rusa, II. Dobroliúbov y Písarev. Universidad de Almería (Almería, 2000). ISBN 84-8240-325-7.
- El espacio en la novela. El papel del espacio narrativo en La ciudad de los prodigios de Eduardo Mendoza. GI TLyLC, Universidad de Almería (Almería, 1999). ISBN 84-930655-0-1.
- con Medina Jaime, Rubén (eds). La palabra del poder y el poder de la palabra. Aproximación a las relaciones entre el discurso político y el narrativo. UNAM-UAL,
- Universidad de Almería y Universidad Nacional Autónoma de México (Almería y México DF, 1999). ISBN 84-930655-1-X.
- con Navas Ocaña y Heras Sánchez (eds.) Actas del V Simposio Internacional de la Asociación Andaluza de Semiótica. Universidad de Almería (Almería, 1995), ISBN 84-8240-023-1
- Introducción histórica a las teorías de la narrativa. Universidad de Almería (Almería, 1994). ISBN 84-8240-001-0.
- (ed.) Escritores españoles exiliados en Francia. Agustín Gómez Arcos. Instituto de Estudios Almerienses (Almería, 1992). ISBN 84-86862-85-X
- (ed.) Curso de Introducción a la semiótica. Instituto de Estudios Almerienses (Almería, 1992), ISBN 84-86862-63-9
- La novela criminal española. Universidad de Granada (Granada, 1991). ISBN 84-338-1489-3
- La prensa. Pearson-Alhambra-Longman (Madrid, 1991). ISBN 84-205-2036-5.
- La novela criminal. Instituto de Estudios Almerienses. (Almería, 1990). ISBN 84-86862-36-1.
- Teoría de la novela criminal. La narrativa criminal española desde 1965. Universidad de Granada (Granada, 1986), 1986. ISBN 84-338-0438-3
- La palabra del poder y el poder de la palabra. 1999. University of Almeria ISBN 84-930-655-1-X

=== Novels ===
- El caso del Asesino de El Quijote. Alhulia (Granada, 2006). ISBN 978-84-96641-01-3
