= Manuel Casal =

Manuel Casal y Aguado (April 20, 1751 – April 6, 1837), better known by his anagrammatic pseudonym Lucas Alemán y Aguado, was a Spanish polymath and poet. In addition to being appointed Dean of the Academia Médico-Quirúrgica Matritense, he was also a distinguished journalist, poet, and playwright.

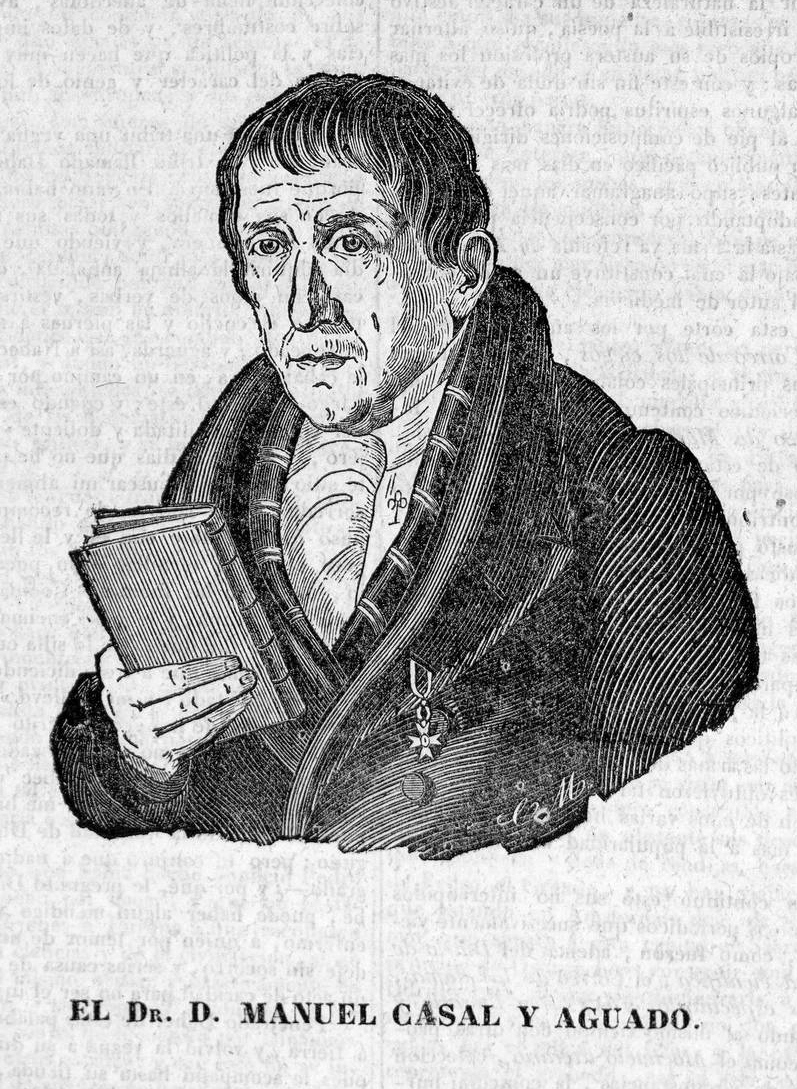
Manuel Casal y Aguado
