= Alfons Martí Bauçà =

Spanish writer

Alfons Marti, or Alfons Marti Bauza, is a Spanish writer, born in Palma de Mallorca (Balearic Islands) on 8 February 1968. He has written essays, a philosophical novel and travel books, amongst other works.
