= Francisco Asensi =

Spanish writer

Francisco Asensi (1936 – 20 November 2013) was a Spanish writer. He was born in Algemesi and studied history at the University of Valencia. He served as a priest for a decade, between 1963 and 1973, but then abandoned the cloth to pursue a variety of careers. He wrote five books, mostly with a religio-historical bent.
