= Carmelo Palomino Kayser =

Spanish poet and painter

Carmelo Palomino Kayser (8 February 1952 – 5 April 2000) was a Spanish poet and painter.

Son of the poet and graphic artist Rafael Palomino Gutierrez and Kayser Isabel Segovia, Palomino had three brothers, Rafael, Isabel and Chapel. In October 1969, he travelled to Valencia, Spain, to study fine arts. Upon his return to Jaén and after getting married, he moved his residence from the center of the old town to Calle Maestra, where he established his first studio. He made his first collective exhibitions in 1968. In 1970, he received the extraordinary award at the National Painting Award held in Cazorla.

In his earlier works the influence of artists such as Pablo Picasso is evident. However, his most widespread work focused on the customs of the most typical corners of Jaén, highlighting his drawing of the taverns and the peasantry of the downtown streets.
