= Miguel del Rey Vicente =

Spanish author of military history

Miguel del Rey is a Spanish author of essay books specialized in history in general and military history. He was the editor of Ristre magazine in its second stage. He has published many books and articles.

Artist Luis Leza Suárez provided the illustrations for Montesa. By this sign conquer; Numancia. Before burnt to charm and Notes on the history of the artillery.

A specialist in uniformology and military flags, del Rey it was director during his second stage —from 2008 to 2010— of the now defunct magazine Ristre of military studies, pioneer in Spain in this matter. He is part of the British Soldier Society, the centenary French association Le Sabretache, the Belgian Society of Figurinists and Military Figures Collectors of America. He has also participated in various cultural projects and exhibitions, advised on television programs and, joined the societies of friends of the vast majority of military museums in Europe —National Army Museum, London; Bayerisches Armeemuseum, Ingolstad; Musée de l'Armée, Paris; Heeresgeschichtliches Museum, Vienna; Hadtorteneti Muzeum, Budapest, etc ...—, collaborated in all the institutional events that they carry out. a member of associations in Spain, France and Great Britain devoted to research in medieval and modern history.

On 5 September 2011 he and coauthor Carlos Canales Torres were awarded the IX Algaba Prize for biography, memoirs and historical research for their essay on sailboat history, Naves mancas. From 2012, he and Torres directed the collection Strokes of history, published by EDAF publishing.

== Bibliography ==
=== Books (in Spanish) ===
- La guerra de África (1859–1860) (Medusa, 2001), ISBN 84-931374-5-6
- La guerra de los diez años (1868–1878) (Ristre Multimedia, 2003), ISBN 84-96205-00-2
- Las Guardias Reales en las campañas de Italia (Ristre, 2008), ISBN 978-84-96205-05-5
- La guerra de la Oreja de Jenkins (Ristre, 2008), ISBN 978-84-96205-07-9
- Las reglas del viento. Cara y cruz de la Armada española en el siglo XVI (con Carlos Canales Torres, EDAF, 2010), ISBN 978-84-414-2525-5
- Breve historia de la guerra del 98 (con Carlos Canales Torres, Nowtilus, 2010), ISBN 978-84-9763-968-2
- Breve historia de la guerra de Ifni-Sahara (con Carlos Canales Torres, Nowtilus, 2010), ISBN 978-84-9763-971-2
- Los años de España en México. De Cortés a Prim (con Carlos Canales Torres, EDAF, 2011), ISBN 8441426740, ISBN 978-84-414-2674-0
- La Batalla de Andoain. Ez da kuartelik su ematen dubenentzat (con Carlos Canales Torres, BLS Ediciones 2011), ISBN 978-84-615-1767-1
- Naves mancas. La armada española a vela de las dunas a Trafalgar (con Carlos Canales Torres, EDAF 2011), ISBN 978-84-414-2879-9
- Blitzkrieg. La victoria alemana en la guerra relámpago (con Carlos Canales Torres, EDAF, 2012), ISBN 978-84-414-3108-9
- La palmera y la esvástica. El África Korps (con Carlos Canales Torres, EDAF, 2012), ISBN 978-84-414-3109-6
- Una jauría de lobos. Submarinos. 1918–1945 (con Carlos Canales Torres, EDAF, 2012), ISBN 978-84-414-3110-2
- Las garras del águila. El segundo Reich. 1871–1918 (con Carlos Canales Torres, EDAF, 2012), ISBN 8441431450, ISBN 978-84-414-3145-4
- A sangre y fuego. La guerra civil americana (con Carlos Canales Torres, EDAF, 2012), ISBN 978-84-414-3146-1
- En tierra extraña. Expediciones militares españolas (con Carlos Canales Torres, EDAF, 2012), ISBN 978-84-414-3206-2
- Arrozales sangrientos. Guerra en Vietnam (con Carlos Canales Torres, EDAF, 2012), ISBN 978-84-414-3214-7
- Fallschirmjäger. Paracaidistas 1935–1945 (con Carlos Canales Torres, EDAF, 2012), ISBN 978-84-414-3215-4
- La audacia en la guerra. Comandos 1939–1945 (con Carlos Canales Torres, EDAF, 2013), ISBN 978-84-414-3260-4
- Abraham Lincoln. La fuerza del destino (con Carlos Canales Torres, EDAF, 2013), ISBN 8441432716, ISBN 978-84-414-3271-0
- Polvo y terror. Las Waffen SS (con Carlos Canales Torres, EDAF, 2013), ISBN 978-84-414-3276-5
- De madera y acero. El resurgir de la armada española (con Carlos Canales Torres, EDAF, 2013), ISBN 978-84-414-3290-1
- Ni un paso atrás. Historias olvidadas (con Carlos Canales Torres, EDAF, 2013), ISBN 978-84-414-3307-6
- Los halcones del mar. La Orden de Malta (con Carlos Canales Torres, EDAF, 2013), ISBN 978-84-414-3340-3
- David y Goliat. El conflicto árabe-israelí (con Carlos Canales Torres, EDAF, 2013), ISBN 978-84-414-3357-1
- Exilio en Kabul. La guerra en Afganistán 1813–2013 (con Carlos Canales Torres, EDAF, 2013), ISBN 978-84-414-3364-9
- Nelson Mandela. El triunfo de la libertad (con Carlos Canales Torres, EDAF, 2013), ISBN 978-84-414-3378-6
- La Gran Guerra. Grandeza y dolor en las trincheras (con Carlos Canales Torres, EDAF, 2014), ISBN 978-84-414-3391-5
- Esclavos. Comercio humano en el Atlántico (con Carlos Canales Torres, EDAF, 2014), ISBN 978-84-414-3401-1
- Valquirias. Mujeres del tercer Reich (con Carlos Canales Torres, EDAF, 2014), ISBN 978-84-414-3428-8
- La Segunda Guerra Mundial. De las trincheras a la guerra total (con Carlos Canales Torres, EDAF, 2014), ISBN 978-84-414-3449-3
- Naves Negras (with Carlos Canales Torres, EDAF, 2015, 2021)
- Bernardo de Gálvez (with Carlos Canales Torres, EDAF, 2015)
- Campos de muerte (with Carlos Canales Torres, EDAF, 2016)
- El oro de América (with Carlos Canales Torres, EDAF, 2016)
- De Salamina a las Malvinas (with Carlos Canales Torres, EDAF, 2016)
- Fidel Castro (with Carlos Canales Torres, EDAF, 2016)
- Demonios del Norte (with Carlos Canales Torres, EDAF, 2017)
- El libro del soldado napoleónico (Esfera de los libros, 2017. Translated into portuguese).
- Tormenta roja (with Carlos Canales Torres, EDAF, 2017)
- Cazadores de almas (with Carlos Canales Torres, EDAF, 2017)
- Sahara, la provincia olvidada (with Carlos Canales Torres, EDAF, 2018)
- De Felipe V a Felipe VI (with Carlos Canales Torres and Augusto Ferrer Dalmau illustrations, EDAF, 2018)
- Mandos y generales de la Guerra Civil (with Carlos Canales Torres, EDAF, 2019)
- Mar de viento (with Carlos Canales Torres, EDAF, 2019)
- A tocapenoles (Modus Operandi, 2019)
- Soldados de fortuna. De los condotieros a Blackwater (with Carlos Canales Torres, EDAF, 2020)
- Atlas de imperios (with Carlos Canales Torres, EDAF, 2020)
- Gloria imperial. La jornada de Lepanto (with Carlos Canales Torres, EDAF, 2021)
- Atlas histórico de España (with Carlos Canales Torres, EDAF, 2021)
- Napoleón en Egipto (La Esfera de los Libros, 2022)
- Guerreros de Cristo (with Carlos Canales Torres, Almuzara, 2022)
- Infografías del Imperio español (with Carlos Canales Torres, EDAF, 2022)
- Historia de Filipinas. Las islas del rey (with Carlos Canales Torres, Almuzara, 2023)
- Infografías de la Reconquista (Edaf, 2024), ISBN 978-84-414-4268-9
