= José Joaquín Casasús =

Spanish writer

José Joaquín Casasús (1733–1822) was a Spanish writer.

Born in Alzira, Valencia, José Joaquín Casasús was the son of José Javier Casasús Judici de Echarte, knight of the Order of Montesa, and of Margarita de Navía-Osorio y Roig, daughter of the marquess of Santa Cruz de Marcenado. He attended Colegio de San Pablo de Valencia, where he studied Latin, French, and philosophy.
