= Manuel Ramírez Fernández de Córdoba =

Spanish journalist

Manuel Ramírez Fernández de Córdoba (September 29, 1948 – March 23, 2007) was a Spanish journalist. He received his Bachelor of Information Sciences at the Complutense University of Madrid.
