= César Fernández García =

Spanish novelist

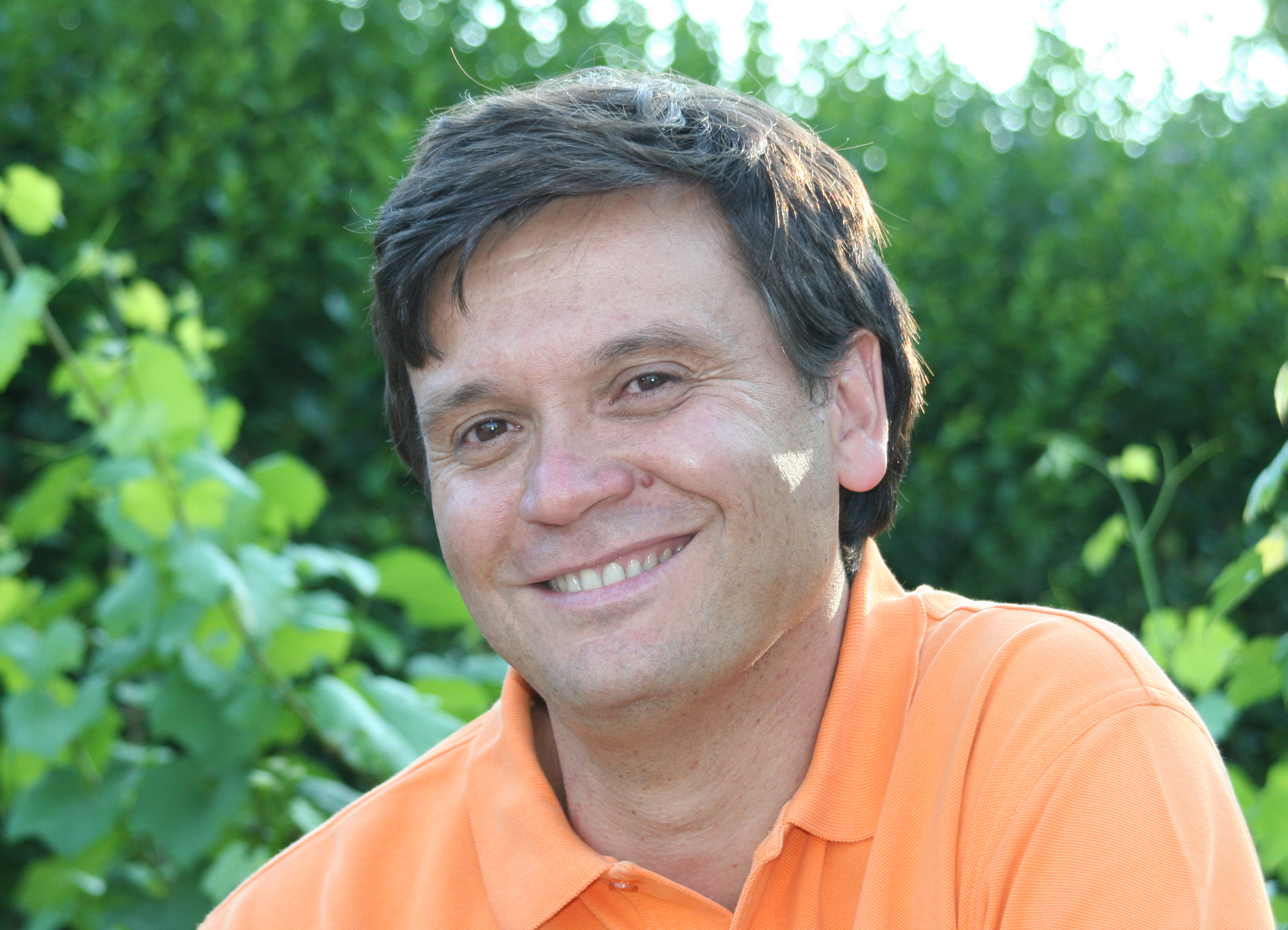
- Born: César Fernández García; 22 April 1967 (age 59); Madrid, Spain
- Education: Complutense University of Madrid
- Occupations: Novelist, short story writer, critic, Professor of Literature
- Writing career
- Language: Spanish
- Period: 2001 -
- Genres: Horror, fantasy, science fiction, gothic, young adult fiction, children's literature, thriller
- Notable works: El e-mail del mal, No digas que estás solo, Las sirenas del alma, La última bruja de Trasmoz, Ellos
- Website: cesarfernandezgarcia.com

César Fernández García (Spanish pronunciation: [ˈθesaɾ feɾˈnandeθ ɣaɾˈθi.a]; born 22 April 1967) is a Spanish novelist. His novels and short stories have been distributed in several countries and have been translated into many languages, including Turkish language and Korean language.

== Personal life ==
César Fernández García was born on 22 April 1967 in Madrid, Spain. He is an author who has written about everything from poetry to mystery novels, including children's literature, young adult fiction and articles. His body of work, which consists of more than thirty titles, has been awarded several prizes. He studied Philology in the Complutense University of Madrid, he has taught Literature at several universities and he has participated in meetings about the joy and adventure of reading and writing at Libraries and High Schools. He also writes articles about creative writing in literary reviews. He is outspoken about subjects such as the importance of always looking at the positive side of life.

His more successful works are No digas que estás solo (Honor Roll 2010 CCEI Award), Ellos (winner of the 2009 Jaén Prize for Young Adult Novel) and La última bruja de Trasmoz (2009 La Galera Literary Prize for Young Adult Fiction).

== Style ==
César Fernández García's fictions are often focused on one strongly defined character. He has used important authors as characters, such as Gustavo Adolfo Bécquer who is the main character in La última bruja de Trasmoz.

The majority of action usually takes place on islands. Ellos is set on Formentera. El hijo del ladrón is set on Tenerife; El rugido de la vida, on La Palma; Las sirenas del alma, on La Gomera; El desafío de la leyenda, on El Hierro...

As readers, we don't find explicit didacticism or moralist allegory in his fictions. César Fernández García believes that meaning in literature should be an undercurrent just beneath the surface.

His works – belonging to several literary genres - mix mystery, tenderness, horror, reality, love and adventure. He has written fantasy novels such as El bibliobús mágico and El rugido de la vida. Mystery novels such as Bárbara y el misterio de Ariadna, La visita del vampiro, Los extraños vecinos del bajo B and Donde vive el miedo. Horror novels such as El e-mail del mal. Children's literature such as No, no y no and Un hogar para Dog. Psychological novels such as La magia del samurái. Social novels such as La camiseta de Óscar. Adventure novels such as El desafío de la leyenda and El hijo del ladrón.

His literary corpus reflects an attempt to sculpt the deflected reality in order to find a meaning of life. Sometimes a subplot becomes the primary focus of the novel little by little. The intrigue and the reflections on human nature are ubiquitous in his fictions. Therefore, La última bruja de Trasmoz reflects about the immortality of the human actions. Ellos raises disturbing questions about what makes us human beings. The survival of the Past, seen as a prelude to the Present, is the main point that builds No digas que estás solo and Las sirenas del alma.

== Bibliography ==
- El bibliobús mágico - Publisher: Brief, 2001. ISBN 978-84-95895-92-9
- Bárbara, detective - Publisher: Eiunsa, 2002. ISBN 978-84-8469-055-9
- Bárbara y el misterio de Ariadna - Publisher: Bruño, 2002. ISBN 978-84-216-9123-6
- Los extraños vecinos del bajo B - Publisher: Bruño, 2003. ISBN 978-84-216-9302-5
- La visita del vampiro - Publisher: Siruela, 2004. ISBN 978-84-7844-857-9
- Ordenadores con bandera pirata - Publisher: Bruño, 2005. ISBN 978-84-216-5473-6
- La magia del samurái - Publisher: Bruño, 2006. ISBN 978-84-216-9221-9
- No, no y no (Honor Roll 2007CCEI Award) - Publisher: Bambú, 2006. ISBN 978-84-8343-008-8
- La camiseta de Óscar - Publisher: Bambú, 2006. ISBN 978-84-8343-013-2
- Donde vive el miedo - Publisher: Bruño, 2007. ISBN 978-84-216-9744-3
- El e-mail del mal (Finalist of the 2007 Jaén Prize for Young Adult Novel) - Publisher: Alfaguara, 2007. ISBN 978-84-204-7194-5
- Un hogar para Dog - Publisher: Bambú, 2007. ISBN 978-84-8343-026-2
- El rugido de la vida (Finalist of the 2007 Edebé literary prize for young adult fiction) - Publisher: Edebé, 2007. ISBN 978-84-236-8867-8
- La oreja de Pompón - Publisher: Bruño, 2008. ISBN 978-84-216-8085-8
- Cuatro misterios para Bárbara detective - Publisher: Palabra, 2008. ISBN 978-84-9840-185-1
- No digas que estás solo (Honor Roll 2010 CCEI Award) - Publisher: Bruño, 2009. ISBN 978-84-216-6292-2
- Un misterio en mi colegio - Publisher: Homolegens, 2009. ISBN 978-84-92518-24-1
- Las sirenas del alma - Publisher: Algar, 2009. ISBN 978-84-9845-139-9
- La última bruja de Trasmoz (La Galera Award 2009) - Publisher: La Galera, 2009. ISBN 978-84-246-3278-6
- Ellos (winner of the 2009 Jaén Prize for Young Adult Novel) - Publisher: Montena, 2009. ISBN 978-84-8441-565-7
- El desafío de la leyenda - Publisher: Brief, 2010. ISBN 978-84-95895-89-9
- El hijo del ladrón - Publisher: Bruño, 2010 ISBN 978-84-216-6570-1
- Sácame de aquí - Publisher: San Pablo, 2011. ISBN 978-84-285-3745-2
- La isla de la televisión - Publisher: Palabra, 2012. ISBN 978-84-9840-584-2
- 16 olímpicos muy, muy importantes - Editorial Bruño, colección Saber Más, 2012.ISBN 978-84-2168-760-4
- Héctor y el colegio embrujado - Editorial Kattigara, colección Fierabrás (Serie Grumetes), 2012. ISBN 978-84-940481-1-1
- 16 dioses y héroes mitológicos muy, muy importantes - Editorial Bruño, colección Saber Más, 2012.ISBN 978-84-216-8851-9
- El mensaje del mal - Editorial Algar, colección Algar Joven, 2012. ISBN 978-84-9845-516-8
- La niebla que te envuelve - Editorial Bruño, colección Paralelo Cero, 2013. ISBN 978-84-216-9966-9
- Bajo control - Editorial Algar, 2014. ISBN 978-84-9845-629-5
- El color de lo invisible - Publisher: Palabra, 2014. ISBN 978-84-9061-118-0
- Los Turboskaters: La leyenda del robot asesino - Editorial Bruño, 2021. Written with Casandra Balbás and Bárbara Balbás. ISBN 978-84-6966-264-9
- Los Turboskaters: La leyenda del cementerio de Nigrum - Editorial Bruño, 2021. Written with Casandra Balbás and Bárbara Balbás. ISBN 978-84-6966-265-6
- Los Turboskaters: La leyenda del videojuego Ferno 666 - Editorial Bruño, 2022. Written with Casandra Balbás and Bárbara Balbás. ISBN 978-84-6966-695-1
- Los Turboskaters: El misterio de la feria de Ténebra - Editorial Bruño, 2023. Written with Casandra Balbás and Bárbara Balbás. ISBN 978-84-6966-897-9
