= Luis García San Miguel =

Spanish academic and jurist

Luis García San Miguel (1929 – 17 December 2006) was a Spanish academic and jurist.
