= Pedro Barrantes =

Spanish writer and journalist

Pedro Barrantes (1850–1912) was a Spanish writer and journalist.

== Works ==
=== Lyrical ===
- Delirium tremens: (poems) Madrid, 1890 (Celestino Apaolaza reprinted, 1910)
- Anatemas, (Valencia, 1892).
- Con Severiano Nicoláu, Dios: canto Valencia, 1888 (Printing house Casa de Beneficencia)
- El drama del calvario: poema Madrid: Printing establishment P. Nuñez, 1887.
- Tierra y cielo, Madrid: El Adalid, 1896.

=== Other ===
- Weyler... Madrid, 1899 (Imp. de Antonio Marzo)
- El Padre Sanz Madrid, 1899 (Antonio Marzo)
- Polavieja Madrid, 1899 (Imp. de A. Marzo)
