= Sofía Tartilán =

Sofía Tartilán (née Sofía Tartilán Rodríguez; after marriage, Sofía Tartilán de Escobar; April 19, 1829 – July 2, 1888) was a 19th-century Spanish novelist, essayist, journalist, and editor. Her name appeared as a regular contributor to much of the high-profile press of her time.

== Biography ==
Sofía Tartilán Rodríguez was born in 1829, in Palencia, Her parents were Félix Tartilán, a native of Guaza de Campos, and Vicenta Rodríguez, a native of Palencia but also from Benavente. The fifth of six sisters, she grew up in a middle-class family environment. She may have studied at the "Sociedad Económica de Amigos del País de Palencia,", directed by Froilana Almirante. The Tartilán family left Palencia around 1845 and probably moved to Valladolid. After she married Mr. Escobar, the couple settled in Madrid in early 1851.

Tartilán wrote fiction and non-fiction. She contributed to the Seville magazine El Gran Mundo, as well as to El Mediodia de Málaga, and Revista Contemporánea, She was the editor of the newspaper, La Caza (1865-1868) and the magazine, Ecos del Auseva. She served as director of La Ilustración de la Mujer (1873-1876). A militant feminist, Tartilán championed a better education for women. She died in Madrid on July 2, 1888, although others think that she was in Tarancón (Cuenca).

== Selected works ==
=== Narrative ===
- La lucha del corazón (Madrid, 1874)
- Caja de hierro (Madrid, 1874)
- La ofrenda de las hadas (Madrid, 1877)
- Costumbres populares. Colección de cuentos tomados del natural (Madrid, 1880)
- Borrascas del corazón (Madrid, 1884)
- La loca de las alas (1884).

=== Essays ===
- Historia de la crítica (Sevilla, 1875).
- Páginas para la educación popular (Madrid, 1877)
