= María Esther García López =

Spanish poet and writer

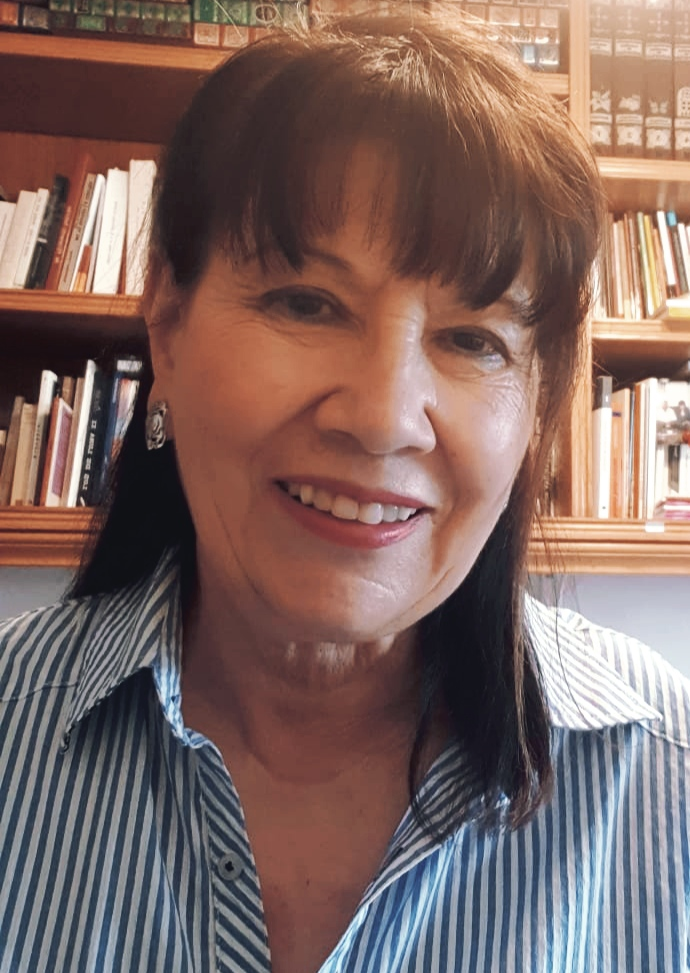
María Esther García López

María Esther García López (born, 8 December 1948, La Degollada, Valdés, Asturias) is a poet and writer in Asturian and Spanish. She is the president of the Asociación de Escritores de Asturias (Asturias Writers Association).

She graduated in pedagogy. She is a teacher and expert in Asturian philology. García is a corresponding member of Academia de la Llingua Asturiana. She served as professor at Universidá Asturiana de Branu (UABRA) for 25 years. She also participated as a jury member in numerous literary competitions and poetry recitals.

== Awards and honours ==
- 2005, Tribute in Luarca from the “Valdés Siglo XXI” Women's Association for her work as a writer and researcher and for her work around the recovery of Asturian language and culture and the defense of women's rights.
- 2007, Uviéu Poetry Prize, in its first edition, with the poetry book Pisadas.
- 2007, Winner of the Fernández Lema short story award with the story "Performance".
- 2007, “Xosé Álvarez” Award for a short story organized by the Asturian Center of Madrid.
- 2007, “Bronze Grouse”, an award given by the Asturianu Center in Madrid.
- 2009, Prize "León Delestal" Asturian Center of Madrid with the story The wedding.
- 2015, Third Prize for poetry "Andén" on the occasion of International Women's Day.
- 2015, "Friend of the Joaquín Rodríguez de Ḷḷuarca Library" Award.
- 2015, “Vaqueira de Honor” from the Vaqueiro and Vaqueirada Festival.
- 2015, "Timón" Award for her literary career.
- 2017, The Valdés Town Hall dedicates the Ḷḷibru de Ḷḷuarca Day to him.
- 2017, Poetisa del Alba for Alborada de Candás.

== Selected works ==
- El Tatuaxe, 1998
- Ḷḷuribaga, 2003
- Zamparrampa: Poemas pa nenos ya nenas, 2004
- Tiempu d'iviernu, 2005
- Aventures del Quixote, 2005
- Historias de Vida ya señas de muerte, 2006
- Faraguyas, 2007
- Pisadas, 2008
- La maestra, 2008
- Musical-landia, 2008
- Performance, 2009
- Menú de Versos, 2009
- Deva y El Pitín, 2010
- A la gueta l'amor, 2010
- Alredor de la Quintana: Animales y otros bichos, 2013
- Quiero ser Arcu Iris, 2014
- Yo taba ellí, 2015
- Yo estaba allí, 2016
- Deva, Flor de Primvera, 2017
- Leo, 2018
- Haikusnora, 2019
- El color de los días, 2019
- La bruja en la Biblioteca, 2019
- A veces el amor es azul, 2020
