= Raúl Quinto =

Spanish writer (born 1978)

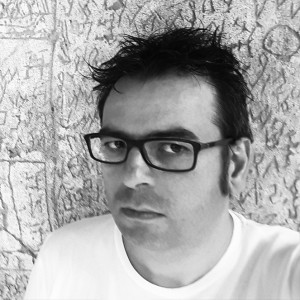
Raúl Quinto

Raúl Quinto (born 1978) is a poet born in Cartagena (Murcia, Spain). Matriculated in Art History at the University of Granada, he published his first book in 2002 with the name Grietas. In the same year, he was a finalist in the Federico García Lorca prize of said university in the area of theatre, for his work Un autor en busca de personajes, written with Andrea Perciaccante and Daniel Rodriguez Moya.

In 2004 he won the Andalucian Youth Poet award with the poetry book "La piel del vigilante", based on the classic comic Watchmen, by Alan Moore and Dave Gibbons.

His poetry can be included in current surrealism and Symbolism, continuously separating itself from the autobiographical. His works since 2010's Idiotica have employed a mixture of written forms. His 2015 work Yosotros was a five-part book that mixed essays, poetry, and narratives. 2017's Hijo was an exploration of fatherhood, and was positively described by critics as intimate and tender.

== Works ==
- Grietas (2002)
- Un autor en busca de personajes (2002)
- La piel del vigilante (2005)
- Idiotica (2010)
- Yosotros (2015)
- Hijo (2017)
- Sola (2020)
- La canción de NOF4 (2021)
