= Juan Francisco de Castro Fernández =

Spanish priest, lawyer, and writer

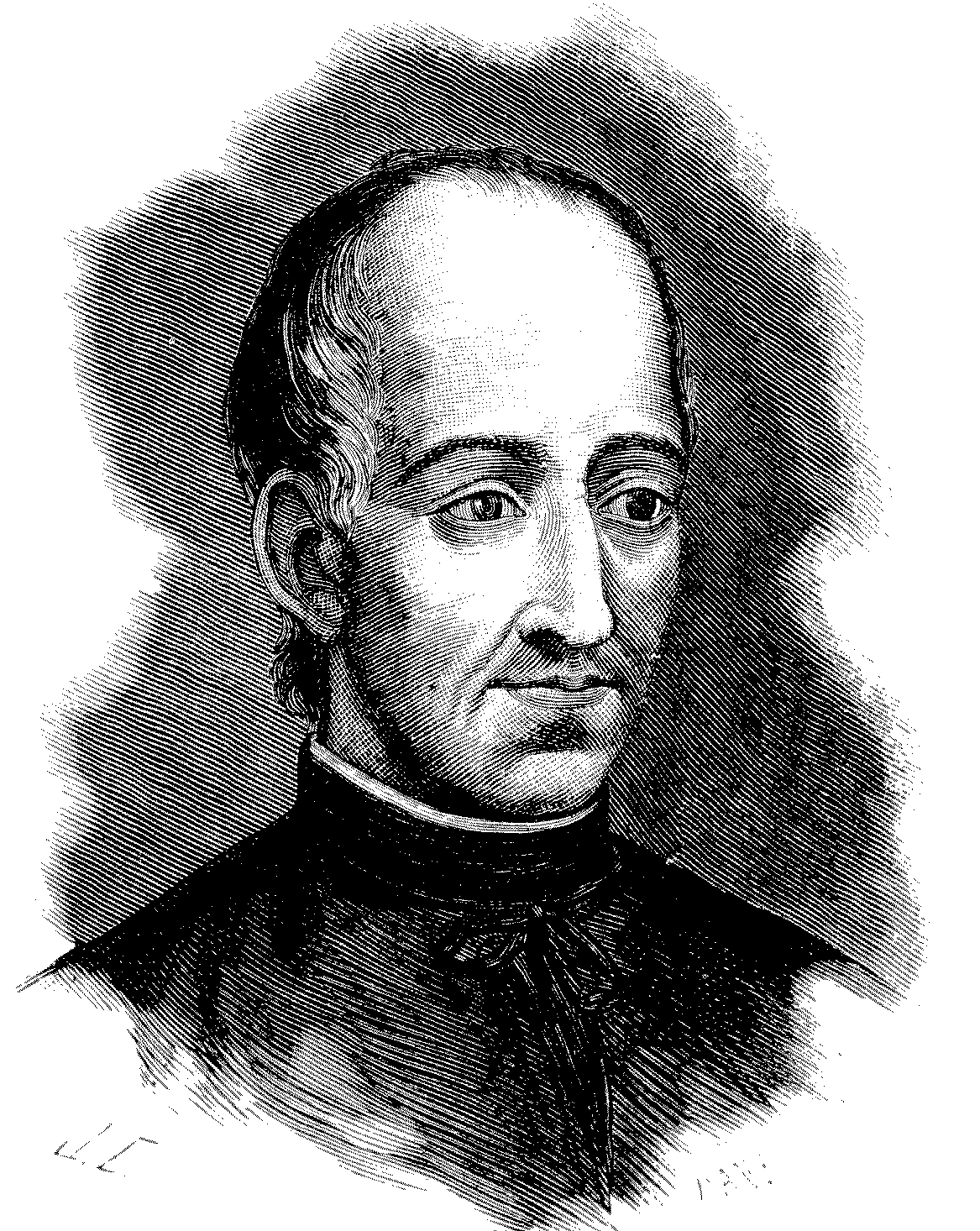
Juan Francisco Portrait

Juan Francisco de Castro Fernández (25 February 1721– 24 December 1790) was a Spanish priest, lawyer, and writer from Lugo.4

Was a Spanish Catholic priest, theologian, and jurist active during the late Enlightenment period. He is best known for his critical legal treatise Discursos críticos sobre las leyes y sus intérpretes ("Critical Discourses on the Laws and Their Interpreters", 1765), in which he engaged with the dominant legal and moral doctrines of his time, especially the influence of probabilism and scholastic casuistry in judicial reasoning.

Castro's work is situated within the broader Iberian tradition of theologico-legal thought, a field where moral theology, natural law, and legal interpretation often intersected. His writings reflect a transitional moment in the Spanish legal culture of the 18th century, between early modern scholasticism and the rationalist aspirations of enlightened reformism.

Recent academic research has brought renewed attention to his role in this intellectual transformation. Julio Cesar Aquino Teles Ferreira, in his master's thesis titled Legal Pathways: the Iberian-Catholic Thought of Juan Francisco de Castro in the 18th Century (2024), analyzes Castro’s treatise as an effort to critique the excessive pluralism of opinions typical of probabilistic moral reasoning. According to Ferreira, Castro advocated for a more secure and unified interpretative framework for law, without entirely abandoning the tradition of casuistic judgment
