= Matilde Cherner =

Spanish writer and journalist

- Born: 1833; Salamanca, Spain
- Died: 15 August 1880 (aged 46–47); Madrid, Spain
- Occupations: writer; journalist
- Writing career
- Pen name: Isabel Luna
- Genres: novels; dramas; literary criticism
- Notable work: María Magdalena: estudio social (1880)

Matilde Rafaela Cherner (pen name, Rafael Luna; 1833 - 15 August 1880) was a 19th-century Spanish writer and journalist. She has been described as a woman "of progressive ideas and clear and marked political convictions" and a "convinced federal republican".

== Early life and education ==
Matilde Rafaela Cherner was born in Salamanca in 1833. Her mother was Antonia Hernández Luna, a native of Aldeadávila de la Ribera, Salamanca, and her father was Juan Cherner, a native of San Fernando, Cádiz. The child's education included learning Latin and French.

== Career ==
Cherner wrote in La Revista Salmantina, where her first poem was published in 1852, and in El Federal Salmantino. During 1872–1873, several of her poems appeared in the latter while she already lived in Madrid.

Under the masculine pseudonym "Rafael Luna", she published the novels Novelas que parecen dramas (1877), Las tres leyes (1878) Ocaso y aurora (1878) y María Magdalena: estudio social (1880), as well as a large number of critical works. She also published plays such as Don Carlos de Austria and La Cruz as well as critical works including Juicio crítico (Critical judgment) on Miguel de Cervantes' Novelas ejemplares.

She collaborated in the Madrid women's magazine La Ilustración de la Mujer, where three poems, a literary story, a study on religious music, and a series of articles on the feminine situation are preserved, collected under the column of "Las mujeres pintadas por sí mismas" (The women painted by themselves), these signed with her real name. Cherner also collaborated in La Ilustración Republicana Federal.

Perhaps her most controversial work was María Magdalena, in which she criticized legalized prostitution as she had already done in her articles of La Ilustración de la Mujer. The theme is prostitution seen through the life of a young woman who has entered this world and it is narrated in the form of a memoir. The prostitute narrates how she has come to this degrading profession. This novel may be the first Spanish novel in which a prostitute is the protagonist. Later, in 1884, the physician Eduardo López Bago published La prostituta, which was highly criticized and the object of some controversy. In 1881, Benito Pérez Galdós published La desheredada, a work that Clarín considered the story of a prostitute. Cherner's work, which was defined by the author in her prologue as naturalistic, although with nuances, is more reflective than descriptive. In it, with a moralizing tone, she criticizes the society that, while needing prostitutes, rejects them.

== Death and legacy ==
She died in her home in Madrid at 21 Calle de la Palma of an aneurysm, according to the official report, on 15 August 1880. However, her unexpected death caused some rumors about a possible suicide as a result of the public pressure she received for her denunciation of prostitution.

In 2022, the publishing house Espinas republished Cherner's work, María Magdalena.

== Selected works ==
=== Novels ===
- Las tres leyes
- Ocaso y aurora (1878)
- María Magdalena: estudio social (1880)
- Novelas que parecen dramas (1878)

=== Drama ===
- Don Carlos de Austria
- La Cruz

=== Literary criticism ===
- Juicio crítico
