= Miguel de Portilla y Esquivel =

Spanish writer, canon and professor of Greek

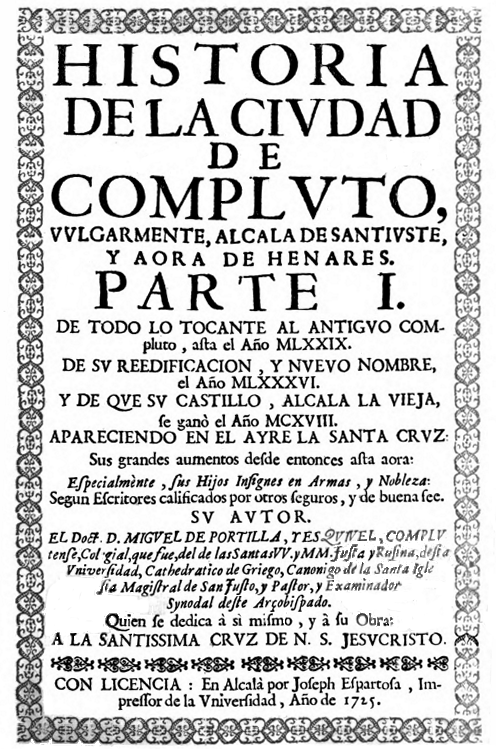
"Historia de la ciudad de Compluto (parte I)" 1725.

Miguel de Portilla y Esquivel (1660–1732) was a Spanish writer, professor of Greek at the College of Saints Justa and Rufina of the University of Alcalá, and canon of the Alcalá de Henares Cathedral.

== Biography ==
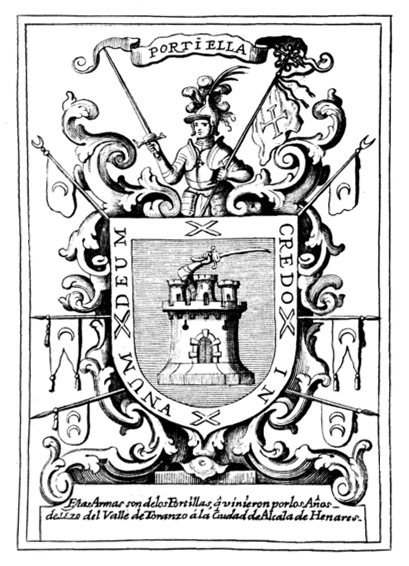
Portiella family Coat of Arms

Miguel was born in Alcalá de Henares in May 1660. His father, the Alcalaino Baltasar de la Portilla Cierzo, was an apothecary in the town and became inspector of chemists' to the Archbishop of Toledo. His mother, María de Tendilla, was a native of Guadalajara, with Miguel as her second child.

In 1679, he entered the College of Saints Justa and Rufina in Alcalá, obtaining a doctorate in theology and later becoming a professor of Greek at the University of Alcalá. He was also a canon of the Magistral of the Holy Children Justo and Pastor, and Pastor and Synodical Examiner of the Archbishop of Toledo.

He died in Alcalá on 21 January 1732.

== Main works ==
- Historia de la Ciudad de Compluto vulgarmente, Alcalá de Santiuste, y aora de Henares (1725–1728).
- Impugnatio propositionum centum et unius eujusdam novatoriz in Gallia. 1718.
- Vida, virtudes y milagros del glorioso señor S. Francisco de Sales. Obispo y Principe de Ginebra... Tercero de los Minimos de S. Francisco de Paula. 1695.
