= James Prohens =

James Prohens (born in Felanitx, Spain, 1911, died in Denver, 2007), poet. James Prohens, also known as Jaume Prohens i Bordoy, lived in Denver, (Colorado) for more than 50 years, where he was the parish priest of St. Cajetan's Church. He was a member of the order Theatines (Clerics Regular) since 1927. He was ordained priest in 1937 and served as Provincial Superior of Spain from 1951 to 1954. Prohens studied at the Pontifical Gregorian University (Rome, 1931), La Plata (Argentina, 1947) and Colorado College (1955), where he earned a master's degree in English literature. He has published four books of poetry in Catalan: Binifarda, Santueri, Horabaixa, and Veus d’intimitat. In Spanish, he published Horas. Always an advocate of tolerance and human rights, he was known for championing the rights of Hispanics and reaching out to gay people and women.

== Publications ==
- Veus d'intimitat Palma de Mallorca: Edicions Documenta Balear, 2004; ISBN 978-84-95694-98-0
- Horabaixa 1993
- Santueri: Endreça i comiat Palma de Mallorca: Centre Cultural de l'Ajuntament de Felantix, 1991
