= Salvador María Granés =

Spanish journalist and author

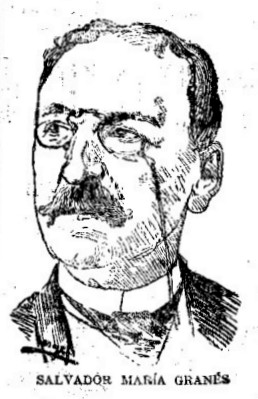
Salvador María Granés, 1894

Salvador María Granés (1840–1911) was a Spanish journalist and author of comic theater, including many parodies of the serious theatrical genres of the late nineteenth century.
