= Juan Manuel Trujillo =

Spanish essayist and publisher

Juan Manuel Trujillo (1907–1976) was a Spanish essayist and publisher.

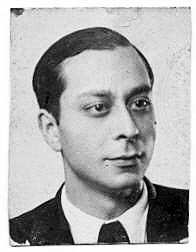
