= Celia =

Celia may refer to:

== Film and television ==
- Celia (1949 film), British comedy thriller
- Celia (1989 film), Australian drama
- Celia (Colombian TV series), a Spanish-language telenovela based on the life of Celia Cruz
- Celia (Spanish TV series), a Spanish TV-series based on Elena Fortún's novels

== Literature ==
- Celia (As You Like It), a character in Shakespeare's As You Like It
- Celia, the title character in the novels by Elena Fortún, including:
  - Celia, lo que dice (1929)
  - Celia en el colegio (1932)
  - Celia en el mundo (1934)

== Music ==
=== Albums ===
- Celia (album), a 2020 album by Tiwa Savage
- Celia, a 2019 tribute album by Angélique Kidjo
- "Celia" (song), a 2011 single by Annah Mac

=== Songs ===
- "Celia", a jazz tune by Bud Powell on his 1950 album Jazz Giant
- "Celia", a song by Phil Ochs on his 1964 album All the News That's Fit to Sing
- "Celia", B-side of the 1974 single "Billy Don't Be a Hero" by Paper Lace
- "Celia", a song by Camila Cabello on her 2022 album Familia

== People and fictional characters ==
- Celia (given name), including a list of people and fictional characters

== Other uses ==
- Celia, a subgenus of carabid beetles of the genus Amara
- Celia, the last natural-born Pyrenean Ibex
- Celia (virtual assistant), AI virtual assistant by Huawei
- Hurricane Celia (disambiguation), a number of hurricanes assigned the name
- SS Celia, a number of ships with this name
