= Felipe Trigo Awards =

- Awarded for: Novel and short narrative
- Sponsored by: Villanueva de la Serena
- Country: Spain
- First award: 1981

The Felipe Trigo Awards (Spanish: Premios Felipe Trigo) are annual literary honors created in 1981 on the initiative of the City Council of Villanueva de la Serena, Spain. On 24 November 1980, the Municipal Assembly agreed to institute it as a tribute to the writer Felipe Trigo, born in the city in 1864.

It is given in two categories: Novel and Short Narrative. A third, Short Narrative by Extremaduran Author, was added in the award's 2nd edition, but then discontinued in its 8th edition in 1988.

The economic endowment of the Felipe Trigo Award is currently €6,000 for Short Narrative (originally 200,000 pesetas) and €20,000 for Novel (originally 400,000 pesetas). It is granted in December, and the winning works are published by Editorial Algaida.

In August 2001, the Government of Extremadura removed the subsidy that had been given to the award. In spite of this, Villanueva de la Serena's councilor of the Felipe Trigo Award, María Lozano, affirmed that it would continue to be given.

== Winning novels ==
- 1981 – La travesía by Esperanza Cifuentes García de la Barrera
- 1982 – Los demonios del síndrome by Arturo Sánchez Vicente
- 1983 – Manuela y el mundo by Elena Santiago
- 1984 – Las cuatro de la tarde by Moisés Cayetano Rosado
- 1985 – La leyenda de Pedro, el raro by Alfonso Martínez Garrido
- 1986 – El deseo como un animal vivo by Pedro Crespo García
- 1987 – Sombras en el espejo by Juan José Ruiz Rico
- 1988 – El morador insomne by Antonio Jiménez Casero
- 1989 – Las cien torres de Babel by Otumba Fernando Ponce and Rafael Flores
- 1990 – Piedra de mármol rojo by Julián Ruiz Bravo
- 1991 – Diálogo con las sombras by Luís Blanco Vila
- 1992 – Destierro by José de Uña Zugasti
- 1993 – La bruja de Lanta by Néstor Gustavo Díaz Bedoya
- 1994 – Distorsión by Juan José Suárez Serrano
- 1995 – El juego de la mandrágora by Álvaro Bermejo Marcos
- 1996 – Las argucias de Frestón by José Antonio Ramírez Lozano
- 1997 – Viviré, si no me olvidas by Daniel Arenas
- 1998 – El mal de la piedra by Francisco Merino Morales
- 1999 – Los poemas de la arena by Ricardo Gómez Gil
- 2000 – El Baño de la Cava by Alfonso Ruiz de Aguirre Bullido
- 2001 – Los muertos siempre pierden los zapatos by Raúl Argemí
- 2002 – El arte de matar dragones by Ignacio del Valle
- 2003 – De las cenizas by Guillermo Galván Olalla
- 2004 – Alejandro Quintana by J. Miguel Martín de la Vega
- 2005 – La poetisa by Jesús Tíscar
- 2006 – Regina Angelorum by Alberto Castellón Serrano
- 2007 – Judit y Holofermes by Fernando Villamía
- 2008 – Las manzanas de Erasmo by José Antonio Ramírez Lozano
- 2009 – Historia vulgar de la Geopolítica. La maldición de los Haushofer by Eduardo Elías Rosenzvaig
- 2010 – vacant
- 2011 – Al acecho by Noemí Sabugal
- 2012 – Una historia perdida by Marisol Ortiz de Zárate
- 2013 – Tu nombre con tinta de café by Fernando Martínez López
- 2014 – Yucé El Sefardí by Gregorio González Olmos
- 2015 – El heredero de Abdel by Evaristo Laguna Téllez
- 2016 – Morderás el polvo by Roberto Osa López
- 2017 – Los nombres de los barcos by Juan Carlos Vázquez García
- 2018 – Dragoman by Jordi Juan Martínez
- 2019 – Los caballos inocentes by Raúl Quirós Molina
- 2020 – La lluvia inglesa by Ana Muela

== Winning short narratives ==
- 1981 – "El Conchito" by José Joaquín Rodríguez Lara
- 1982 – "La charca" by Juan Gómez Saavedra
- 1983 – "El eco viene distorsionado" by José Luis Ramírez de Arellano
- 1984 – "Memento de los pavos reales" by Manuel Jurado López
- 1985 – "Solos al sol con Dalila" by Anastasio Fernández Sanjosé
- 1986 – "Los fusilados de ayer" by Fanny Buitrago
- 1987 – "Los canardos" by Dolores Soler-Espiauba
- 1988 – "Mujer con paisaje de luna" by Dolores Soler-Espiauba
- 1989 – "Cuesta del perro" by Carlos Murciano
- 1990 – "Ausencia" by Emilio Rey
- 1991 – "El testamento de la marquesa" by Luis Díez Tejón
- 1992 – "El filósofo en su jaula" by Manuel Jurado López
- 1993 – "Como si nada existiese" by José María Pérez Álvarez
- 1994 – "El marido de Alicia" by Félix Grande
- 1995 – "Novela famosa de los asombros de Parténope" by Félix Dativo Donate Aparicio
- 1996 – "¡Con viento fresco Mónica!" by Matilde Asensi
- 1997 – "Un sótano para unas manos" by Rafael J. Benítez
- 1998 – "La mácula" by Enriqueta Flores Arredondo
- 1999 – "El flamboyán, la esclava y el mambí" by Luis Arturo Hernández Pérez
- 2000 – "Una tristeza antigua" by José Luis Sevillano Fernández
- 2001 – "Alas Negras" by Miguel Ángel Otero Furelos
- 2002 – "Ella Anda" by Francisca Gata Amate
- 2003 – vacant
- 2004 – "Las horas contadas" by Mario Quirós Lobo
- 2005 – "El cuarto inclinado" by Alberto de La Rocha
- 2006 – "La importancia de que las abejas bailen" by Diego González
- 2007 – vacant
- 2008 – "'La casa habitada" by Carlos Jiménez Climent
- 2009 – "Ni diez kilómetros de paternidad" by Mariano Catoni
- 2010 – "Cerezas" by Enrique Javier de Lara11
- 2011 – "La leyenda de Abelardo" by Bernardo Pilatti1
- 2012 – "Mamá duerme la siesta" by Beatriz Olivenza Bernardo
- 2013 – "El aliento" by Guillermo Galván Olalla
- 2014 - "Los variados avatares de Chejov" by José María Fons Guardiola
- 2015 – "De libros y hombres" by Miguel Torres López de Uralde
- 2016 – vacant
- 2017 – vacant
