= Gárgola =

Gárgola is the Spanish word for gargoyle, and may refer to:

- Gárgola, prize-winning novel by Spanish author José Antonio Ramírez Lozano, 1984
- La Gárgola 2014 album
- Álex Gárgolas reggaeton producer
