= The Best Thing That Can Happen to a Croissant =

- Theatrical release poster
- Spanish: Lo mejor que le puede pasar a un cruasán
- Directed by: Paco Mir
- Screenplay by: Paco Mir
- Based on: Lo mejor que le puede pasar a un cruasán by Pablo Tusset
- Starring: Pablo Carbonell; Marta Belaustegui; Nathalie Seseña; Jose Coronado
- Cinematography: Kiko de la Rica
- Edited by: Frank Gutiérrez
- Music by: Pepín Tre
- Production company: Ovideo TV
- Distributed by: Lauren Films
- Release date: 21 November 2003
- Country: Spain
- Language: Spanish

The Best Thing That Can Happen to a Croissant (Spanish: Lo mejor que le puede pasar a un cruasán) is a 2003 Spanish comedy film directed and written by Paco Mir based on the novel by Pablo Tusset. It stars Pablo Carbonell alongside Marta Belaustegui, Nathalie Seseña, and José Coronado.

== Plot ==
Full-time slacker Pablo Miralles sets for searching his missing brother Sebastián encouraged by Fina and Gloria.

== Cast ==
- Pablo Carbonell as Pablo Miralles
- José Coronado as Sebastián Miralles
- Marta Belaustegui as Gloria
- Nathalie Seseña as Fina
- Anna M. Barbany as mother
- Arseni Corsellas as father
- Amparo Valle
- Pep Ferrer as Luigi
- Lola Marceli
- Irene Montalà as Carmela
- André Oumansky as Pierre François

== Production ==
The film was produced by Ovideo TV, and it had the participation of Trivideo, Tricicle, TVE, Canal+, and TVC. It boasted a budget of €2.2 million.

== Release ==
Distributed by Lauren Films, the film was released theatrically in Spain on 21 November 2003.

== Reception ==
Jonathan Holland of Variety considered that the film "raises an occasional smile but is largely indigestible thanks to the anything-goes plotline, lack of warmth and general derivativeness".

Javier Ocaña of El País wrote that the broad-brush comedy is "seasoned with an intrigue plot lacking in interest and a nefarious direction of actors".

== See also ==
- List of Spanish films of 2003
