= Chicken skin =

Chicken skin can refer to:

- The skin of a chicken
- Keratosis pilaris, a condition commonly known as 'chicken skin'
- Goose bumps
- Chicken Skin (series), an anthology of ghost stories by Glen Grant
- Chicken Skin (film), a 2001 film
