= Celia en el mundo =

- Cover of the first edition of Celia en el mundo, 1934
- Author: Elena Fortún
- Illustrator: Molina Gallent
- Language: Spanish
- Series: Celia y su mundo
- Genre: Children's novel
- Publisher: Manuel Aguilar (1934); Alianza Editorial (2000)
- Publication date: 1934; reprints in 1939, 1942. 1949, 1992, 1993, 2004 and 2006
- Publication place: Spain
- Media type: Print (Hardback & Paperback)
- Pages: 211 pp
- ISBN: 84-206-6032-9
- Preceded by: Celia novelista (1934)
- Followed by: Celia y sus amigos (1935)

Celia en el mundo ("Celia in the world" or "Celia out in the world") is the fourth installment in the series of "Celia" novels by Spanish children's author, Elena Fortún. Originally published in the year 1934, the novel continues the adventures of Celia in a series now considered classics of Spanish children's literature. In the fourth novel, Celia is taken away by her uncle from the convent where she had resided in Celia en el colegio (1932), and is brought to live with him and his servants, Basílides and Maimón. Celia spends quite a lot of time among grown-ups rather than with children her own age. Eventually, she befriends a young French girl named Paulette who becomes her constant companion throughout many adventures and misadventures. Like the previous novels, Celia en el mundo reflected a country slowly entering its civil war years, as well as the, often negative, general views people of those times had towards certain social groups, including the Moors, the Galicians, and to a lesser extent, the French, as well as the religious communities, such as the nuns. Different editions and reprints of the book featured artwork from different illustrators; the most recent editions featured Molina Gallent's artwork, while older editions featured that of M. Palacios and Gori Muñox. This was the very first "Celia" novel to not be featured in its entirety or even partially in Televisión Española's 1992 series, Celia, directed by José Luis Borau.

== Plot summary ==
Published after Celia novelista (1934), the book picks up the story that was left off in Celia en el colegio (1932).

Celia's uncle, Tío Rodrigo, had arrived at the school where Celia attended class with the nuns and had rudely taken her away, without her parents permission or consent, because he strongly believed that the nuns were a poor influence for Celia, and her mind would only be filled with uncultured foolishness rather than educational nourishment. Celia is taken to her uncle's home in Madrid, to live with Basílides, Rodrigo's servant, and Maimón, a young Moor boy; two characters who could hardly stand each other's presence. Rodrigo wants the nine-year-old girl to "see the world", but not the world as in "earth", the world as in "real life". Living with her uncle, Celia spends many days without the company of boys and girls her own age, but rather that of older people. Her uncle asks her to behave when he takes her out with his friends to restaurants or to the park, but Celia hesitates; the grown-ups she spends time with make such curious, sometimes silly, remarks that Celia feels she must have a say in their conversation. Rodrigo's rule for Celia in order for her to be a well-behaved little lady, is for her to speak only when spoken to and to remain still the rest of the time. At home Celia deals with constant arguments between her uncle and Basílides, as well as the latter's beloved pet owl, and the battling between the servant woman and Maimón. Celia, Rodrigo, Basílides and Maimón, as well as the animals, the owl Casimira and the cat Pirracas, spend their summer in a French villa. Basílides has a hard time adapting to this strange place where no one can understand her Spanish, but Celia manages to make a couple of very good friends. The young girl Paulette becomes Celia's best friend and companion during the summer, visiting each other at their houses or spending time at the beach. The two have another friend, a girl named Claude. Claude is from a poor family and has an older brother named Raymund that cannot join her during her vacation, because their family cannot afford to send them both on holiday to the beach. Celia comes up with a plan to help Claude's brother through numerous schemes to earn money from people, including the selling of Rodrigo's berries and flowers as well as telling the people she meets at the beach about the sad situation of Claude's family, especially her brother's. Celia's aunt and Rodrigo's sister, Julia, arrives just in time to help Celia's cause, but soon the aunt contributes to a lot of bothersome hassle within the French villa. When summer's over, Tío Rodrigo bids farewell to Basílides and Maimón as he sends them back to Madrid, Spain on train. Rather than return home, Celia and her uncle and invited to spend Christmas with Paulette's family in a grand castle, where Celia again stirs up plenty of trouble. When the two girls are severely punished over a series of mischief, Celia tries to escape with Paulette, who's being sent off to a school in Paris, and manages to crash the car she had stowed away into against a tree. Unconscious and believing herself dead, Celia wakes up to the voice of her own father, who's come to return her to Spain, because he wants his daughter to bloom as a Spaniard, and believes the constant changing of culture and language is too much for her young mind.

The book is told in first-person from Celia's perspective, like in all previous books, following a third-person introduction from author Elena Fortún's.

== Adaptations ==
Celia's uncle Rodrigo, played by Fernando Valverde and Maimón as they appeared in the 1992 series, Celia.

Celia en el mundo was the first of the "Celia" novels to not be adapted as part of the 1992 series directed by José Luís Borau; only a very small part of the previous book, Celia novelista (1934) was adapted as the very last few minutes of the sixth and last episode, "¡Hasta la vista!" Some major characters from the fourth book played rather small roles in the series, including Tío Rodrigo, Maimón, Basílides and Tía Julia.

Tío Rodrigo, Celia's uncle and her father's brother, appeared only in the second episode of the series, "Doña Benita." He was introduced as Celia told her friend María Teresa about his uncle's arrival with Maimón. Tío Rodrigo, played by Spanish actor Tito Valverde, was represented as a very loving uncle to Celia and a dear brother-in-law to her mother, also referred to as "very handsome" by the girl. His last appearance was in the very same episode, when he invites Celia to his quiet and boring birthday party, where the girl and her two snobby girl-cousins celebrated together as he retired due to a headache, as well as the pressures of aging. Maimón was introduced at the same time as Tío Rodrigo, and was immediately disliked by Doña Benita, who believed him to be a thief. Maimón is saddened by the dislike certain characters show against him, such as Basílides, Doña Benita and Celia's two cousins. The Moor boy appeared again and for the last time in the fifth episode, "Ni santa, ni mártir", where he came to attend Celia's final examinations for her first schoolyear at the convent.

Both Basílides and Tía Julia had small roles in the series. Basílides, played by the Spanish actress Diana Salcedo, was introduced in Rodrigo's birthday party, where she tried to keep the three girls in peace with one another, and especially from upsetting their uncle. Basílides, just like Rodrigo, did not appear again the series. Finally, Tía Julia played a slightly larger role in the series, though she only appeared in two episodes. In the first episode, "Soy Celia", Tía Julia joined Celia's family for Christmas, and several times tried to convince her father to send the girl to school with the nuns, an option Celia's father, Pablo, did not find suitable. Tía Julia reappeared again for the last time in the third episode, "El verano", with the same purpose as before. The second time, however, she was successful in convincing Celia's parents as the girl's misbehaving gravely endangered the life of her little brother, "Cuchifritín". The short appearances of all four characters limited the deeper character development that was expanded in the fourth book of the series.
