= Ángeles Vicente =

20th-century Spanish writer

Ángeles Vicente (Note: However, there are records of her full birth name being María de los Ángeles)
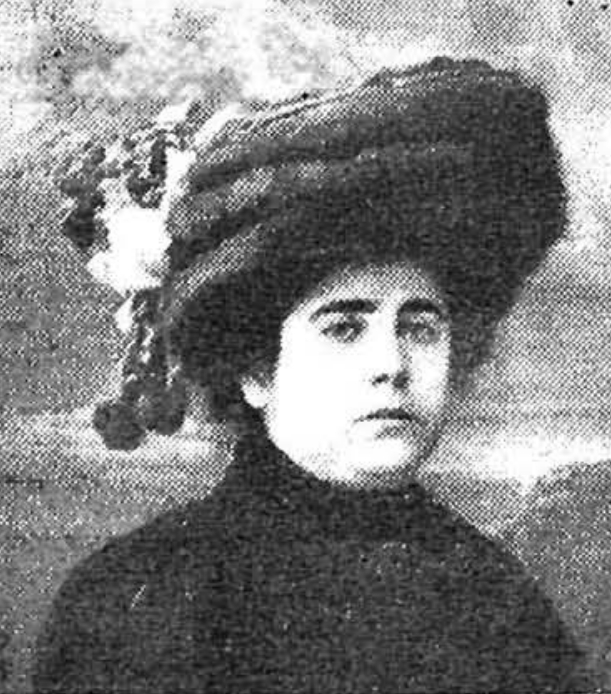
- Vicente in 1911
- Born: January 28, 1873 (Note: However, there are records of her birthdate being 29 January 1873); Murcia, Spain
- Died: 1918 (aged 39–40)
- Occupation: Writer
- Notable work: Zezé
- Movement: Freemasonry

Ángeles Vicente García (28 January 1878 in Murcia, Spain – 1918) was a Spanish writer, author of Zezé, the first novel in Spanish-language literature to have a lesbian protagonist. From 1920 onwards, all traces of the author have been lost and nothing else is known of her later life.

== Biography ==
Her parents were José María Vicente Nicolás, a native of Murcia, and Inocencia García Belda, a native of Cartagena.

In 1888, at the age of ten and after having lost her mother, she left for Argentina with her father and siblings, remaining there until 1906, when she returned to Spain. In Buenos Aires, she joined the Freemasons. She settled in Milan for a few months and there she began to correspond with Miguel de Unamuno. Then, after a while in Málaga, she settled in Madrid.

She started to collaborate with newspapers and magazines. After her first book, Teresilla, was published, she separated from her husband, Cándido Elormendi Goñi, and lived on what she earned from her writing, together with her father and a maid. In 1916, having been widowed, she returned to Buenos Aires, where all traces of her life have been lost.

The last two of her works that have been found are the short story La sombra que llora in magazine Reflejos (Granada, August 1929), and La sorpresa in newspaper Luz (Madrid, 21 March 1932). Both deal with occult themes.

Thanks to her stay in Argentina, she became acquainted with Latin American schools of thought and literary movements. She followed occultist movements and fantasy literature, especially spiritualist stories and science fiction. She also dealt with social issues and stood for women's rights. Furthermore, she wrote erotic fiction.

In Madrid, she frequented intellectual circles and met Rubén Darío, Rafael López de Haro, Álvaro Retana, Luis Linares Becerra, Miguel de Unamuno, Luis de Terán, and Emilio Fernández Vaamonde.

== List of works ==
Title	Date of publication	Genre	Notes
Teresilla	1907	Novel	With an introduction by her friend Felipe Trigo, at the time considered the most successful Spanish author of erotic novels. The protagonist of the story, Teresilla, is seduced and abandoned by an irresponsible and womanizing man, which leads her into prostitution and a lack of options to get out of that situation. The plot reflects the lack of social support, as well as the limitations faced by women in certain historical or cultural contexts. It raises the situation of helplessness and social vulnerability of women at the time.
Los buitres	1908	Short story	Collection of 12 short stories with the common theme of social criticism. She dedicated the book to her sisters-in-law Francisca and Segunda Elormendi como testimonio de afecto. (Note: English: As a sign of affection)
Zezé	1909	Novel	The first literary work in Spain, written by a woman, to tell a lesbian narrative. It tells the story of cabaret singer (Note: Cupletista, that is, a performer of cuplés) Zezé, as she narrates her life to a writer with whom she shares a cabin on a trip between Buenos Aires and Montevideo.
Sombras: cuentos psíquicos	1910	Short story	A collection of 14 horror and mystery stories based on Latin American myths. She had previously published these in magazine Blanco y Negro and El Imparcial newspaper between 1912 and 1915.

== See also ==
- LGBT literature in Spain
- Spanish literature
- Spanish-language literature
- Felipe Trigo

== Bibliography ==
- Barranco Sánchez, Mercedes (2021). "Ángeles Vicente García. Escritora erótica, espiritista y de ciencia ficción" [Ángeles Vicente García. Writer of erotic, spiritualist, and science fiction literature.] (PDF). Náyades (in Spanish). 3 (9). Murcia: Las Torres de Cotillas City Council and Qutiyyas Cultural Association: 3–12. ISSN 2659-7020.
- Bonmatí Gonzálvez, Elena; Cheesewright, Kyle (18 September 2024). "Ángeles Vicente's 1911 sapphic scandals: queer intermedia and transatlantic gender history". Feminist Modernist Studies. 7. Taylor & Francis: 1–25. doi:10.1080/24692921.2024.2399113. ISSN 2469-2921.
- Ena Bordonada, Ángela (November 2006) [1908]. "Introducción" [Prologue]. Los buitres (cuentos) [The vultures (short stories)] (in Spanish) (2nd ed.). Murcia: Editora Regional de Murcia. ISBN 84-7564-348-5.
- Muelas Herraiz, Martín (1986). La obra narrativa de Felipe Trigo [The narrative work of Felipe Trigo] (PhD thesis) (in Spanish). University of Alicante. ISBN 84-688-2244-2.
- Pena García, Sabela (2018). "El ángel del hogar se echó a volar": La construcción de las nuevas feminidades en la novela de la Edad de Oro de las escritoras españolas [El ángel del hogar (The angel of the house) took flight: The construction of new femininities in the Golden Age novel by Spanish women writers.] (PhD thesis) (in Spanish). University of Colorado.
