= Former Casino of Toledo =

Coordinates: 39.8587°N 4.0217°W

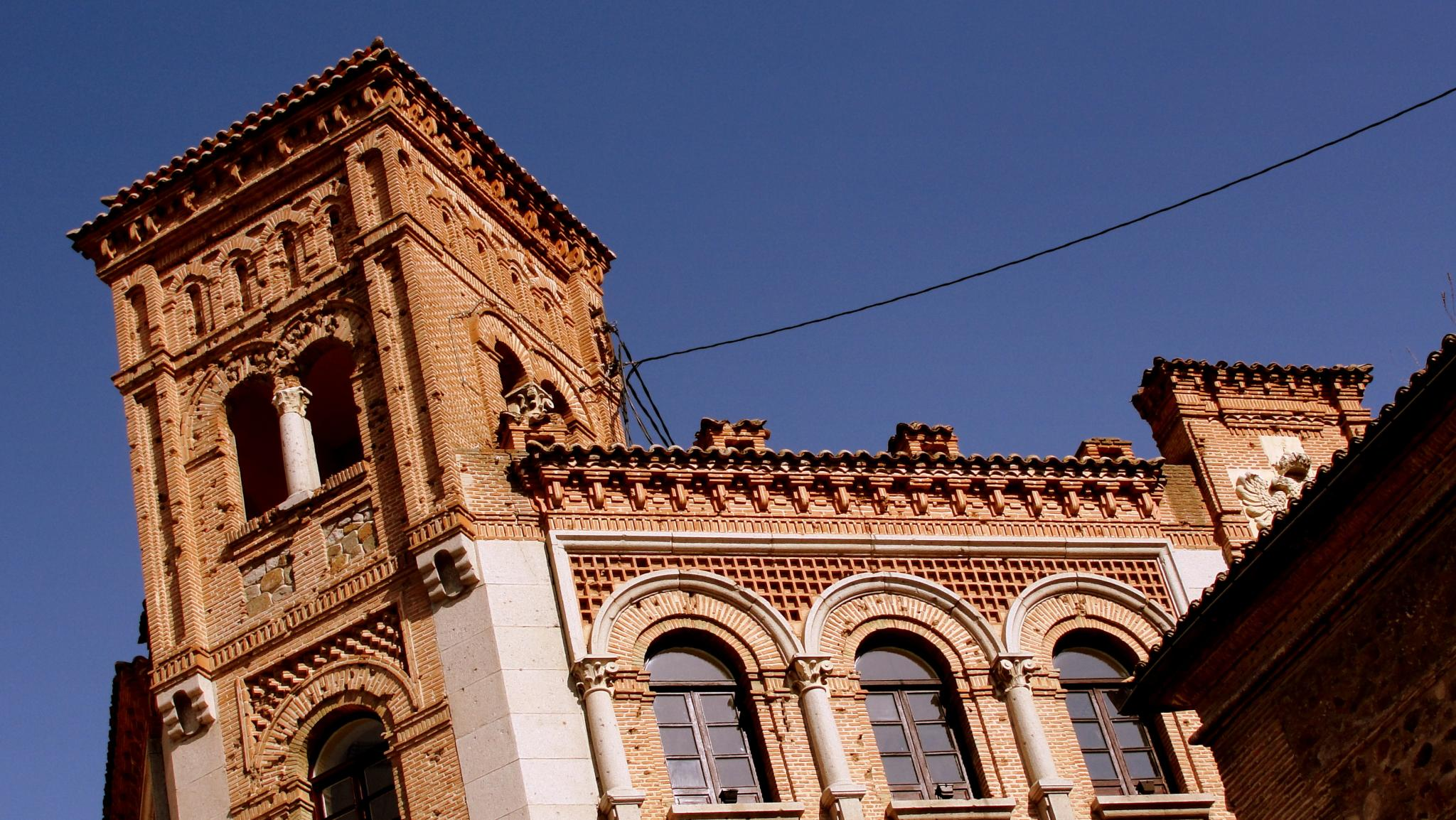
Upper part of the building

The building of the former Casino of Toledo (Spain), whose real name corresponds to the one of Center of Artists and Industrialists, belongs to the trend of Eclecticism that develops In Europe in the 19th century. The architect, Felipe Trigo, mixed elements of the Renaissance, in the configuration and planning of the facade, and Mudéjar, in the use of the brick.

The building, whose plant is a quadrilateral, has four floors and a tower; the latter form chamfered corner and houses the main entrance.

The materials used in the exterior are very different. Granite has been used in plinth, portal, corners and decorative elements; brick in holes, trim and turret, and masonry in the canvases.

Two construction zones can be differentiated, considering the time in which they were erected. The oldest dating from the 1920s and the most recent was built in the 1960s.

In 2015 a Saudi Sheikh buys part of the casino for an Islamic interpretation center.
