= Zezé (novel) =

20th-century Spanish novel

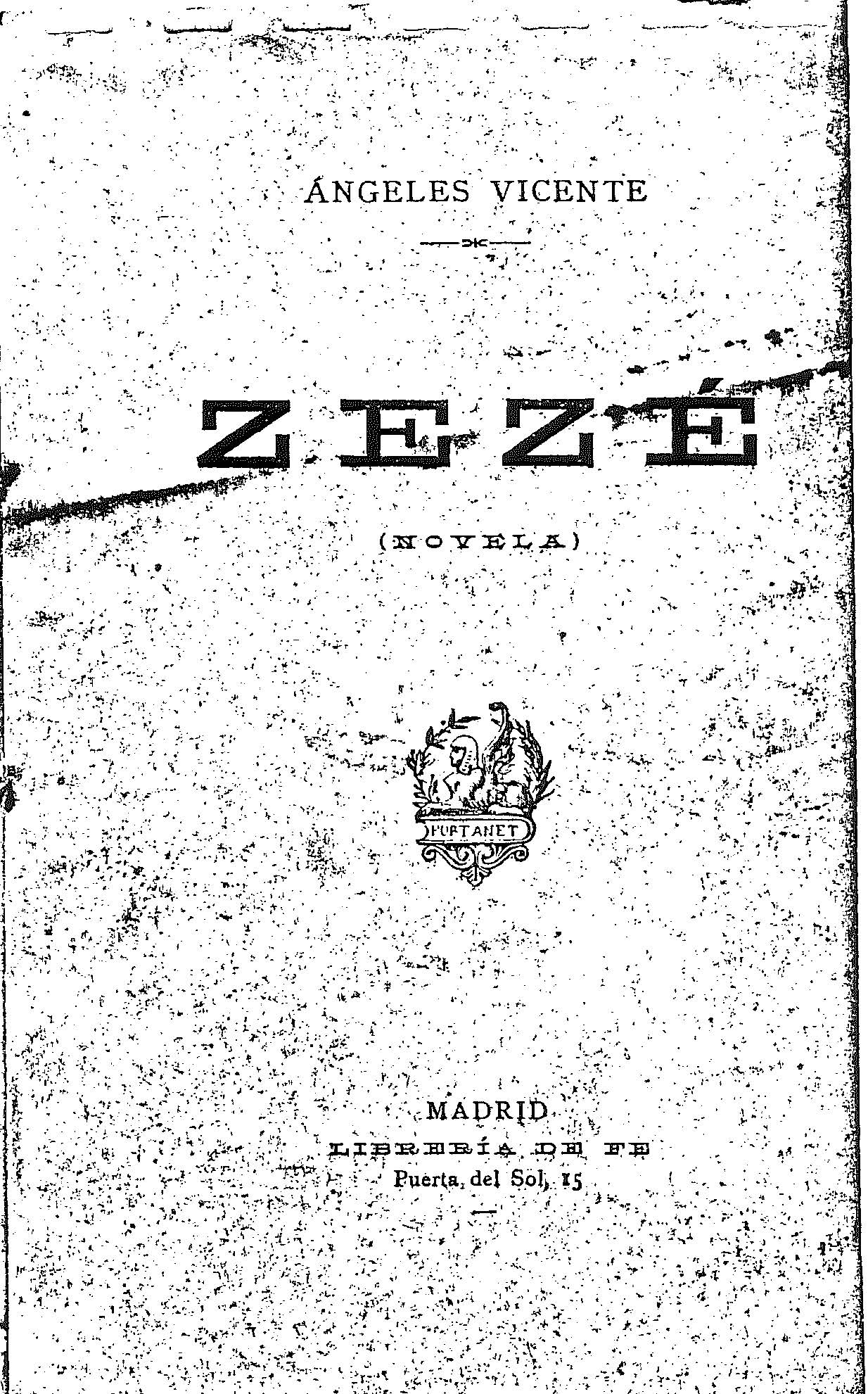
- Author: Ángeles Vicente
- Language: Spanish
- Genre: Novel
- Published: 1909
- Publication place: Spain

Zezé is a Spanish novel written by Ángeles Vicente and published in 1909. Its importance lies in the fact that it is the first Spanish-language novel to deal with lesbian themes, and one of the first in Europe and the Americas.

== The author ==
Little is known about the author. Ángeles Vicente García was born in Murcia in 1878. Then, in 1888, when she was 10 years old, she moved to Argentina, from where she returned to Spain in 1906. After her return from Argentina, she settled with her husband, Cándido Elormendi, in Madrid. She worked as a collaborator for newspapers and magazines, and eventually published several books. After her first book was published, she separated from her husband and lived on what she earned from her writing, together with her father and a maid.

In Madrid, she frequented intellectual circles and met Rubén Darío and Miguel de Unamuno, among others. Felipe Trigo, the most successful Spanish author of erotic novels at the time, praised her for her beauty. He would eventually write the prologue to her first book, Teresilla (1907).

== Plot ==
The novel takes place during a nocturnal sea voyage between Buenos Aires and Montevideo, although most of the action takes place in Madrid. During the night, Zezé (a cabaret singer (Note: Cupletista, that is, a performer of cuplés)) and a writer (a stand-in for the author herself) share a cabin. Zezé tells the author her life story and her observations about the human condition. She begins by talking about her time at a convent school, where she discovered sex with a female classmate, and then talks about her life in Madrid, where she struggled to make her way against misogyny and the problems posed by social conventions.

== Analysis ==
Strictly speaking, the book is a Bildungsroman, with picaresque undertones, about a woman searching for her identity and dignity. The novel speaks in favor of living a lifestyle as a single person, based on affection and regardless of gender. One of the novel's most remarkable traits is the way the plot deals with a lesbian relationship. The fact is so unusual as to be the first mention of its kind in a Spanish-language novel and one of the first in Europe and the Americas.

The story denounces the marginalization of and lack of solidarity with women in early 20th-century society. It especially criticizes the predominant machismo and Don Juanism of the time. Vicente criticizes three aspects of society: family, school, and the Church, all of which she blames for the oppression caused by sanctimonious morality and the petite bourgeoisie. The solution would have come through education. In the meantime, it would only leave the possibility of solitude and the company of simple people.

The author cannot be categorized within either of the two currents of the time: the Generation of '98 and Regenerationism. The novel is clearly in favor of naturalism, in Rousseau's sense, and against conventionalism, and the author is nostálgica de un romanticismo que ella misma entrevé caduco (Note: English: Nostalgic for a romanticism that she herself sees as outdated)

The novel was rescued from oblivion by Hispanic studies scholar Ángela Ena Bordonada in a 2005 reprint. It is considered one of the founding milestones of LGBT literature in Spain. The Italian translation of this novel has been published in 2025 by the University of Bologna.

== See also ==
- LGBT literature in Spain
- Spanish-language literature
- Spanish literature
- Lesbian literature

== Bibliography ==
- Barranco Sánchez, Mercedes (2021). "Ángeles Vicente García. Escritora erótica, espiritista y de ciencia ficción" [Ángeles Vicente García. Writer of erotic, spiritualist, and science fiction literature.] (PDF). Náyades (in Spanish). 3 (9). Murcia: Las Torres de Cotillas City Council and Qutiyyas Cultural Association: 3–12. ISSN 2659-7020.
- Belmonte Serrano, José (2008). "LXXIII. Contra el estúpido donjuanismo" [Against stupid Don Juanism.]. La hora crítica [The critical hour] (in Spanish). Murcia: Tres Fronteras Ediciones. pp. 191–192. ISBN 8475644090.
- Bonmatí Gonzálvez, Elena; Cheesewright, Kyle (18 September 2024). "Ángeles Vicente's 1911 sapphic scandals: queer intermedia and transatlantic gender history". Feminist Modernist Studies. 7. Taylor & Francis: 1–25. doi:10.1080/24692921.2024.2399113. ISSN 2469-2921.
- Ena Bordonada, Ángela (November 2006) [1908]. "Introducción" [Prologue]. Los buitres (cuentos) [The vultures (short stories)] (in Spanish) (2nd ed.). Murcia: Editora Regional de Murcia. ISBN 84-7564-348-5.
- Iñigo Clavo, Ainoa (2024). "Escrito en Queer: "Zezé" de Ángeles Vicente" [Written in queer: "Zezé" by Ángeles Vicente]. Cuadernos de Investigación Filológica (in Spanish) (54). Logroño, Spain: University of La Rioja: 65–84. doi:10.18172/cif.5800. ISSN 0211-0547.
- Pena García, Sabela (2018). "El ángel del hogar se echó a volar": La construcción de las nuevas feminidades en la novela de la Edad de Oro de las escritoras españolas [El ángel del hogar (The angel of the house) took flight: The construction of new femininities in the Golden Age novel by Spanish women writers.] (PhD thesis) (in Spanish). University of Colorado.
- Vicente, Ángeles, transl. by Vincenzo Quaranta (2025) [1909]. Zezé [Zezé] (in Italian). Bologna: Alma Mater Studiorum - Università di Bologna. Genealogie e futuri (2).
