= Anabel Alonso =

Spanish actress

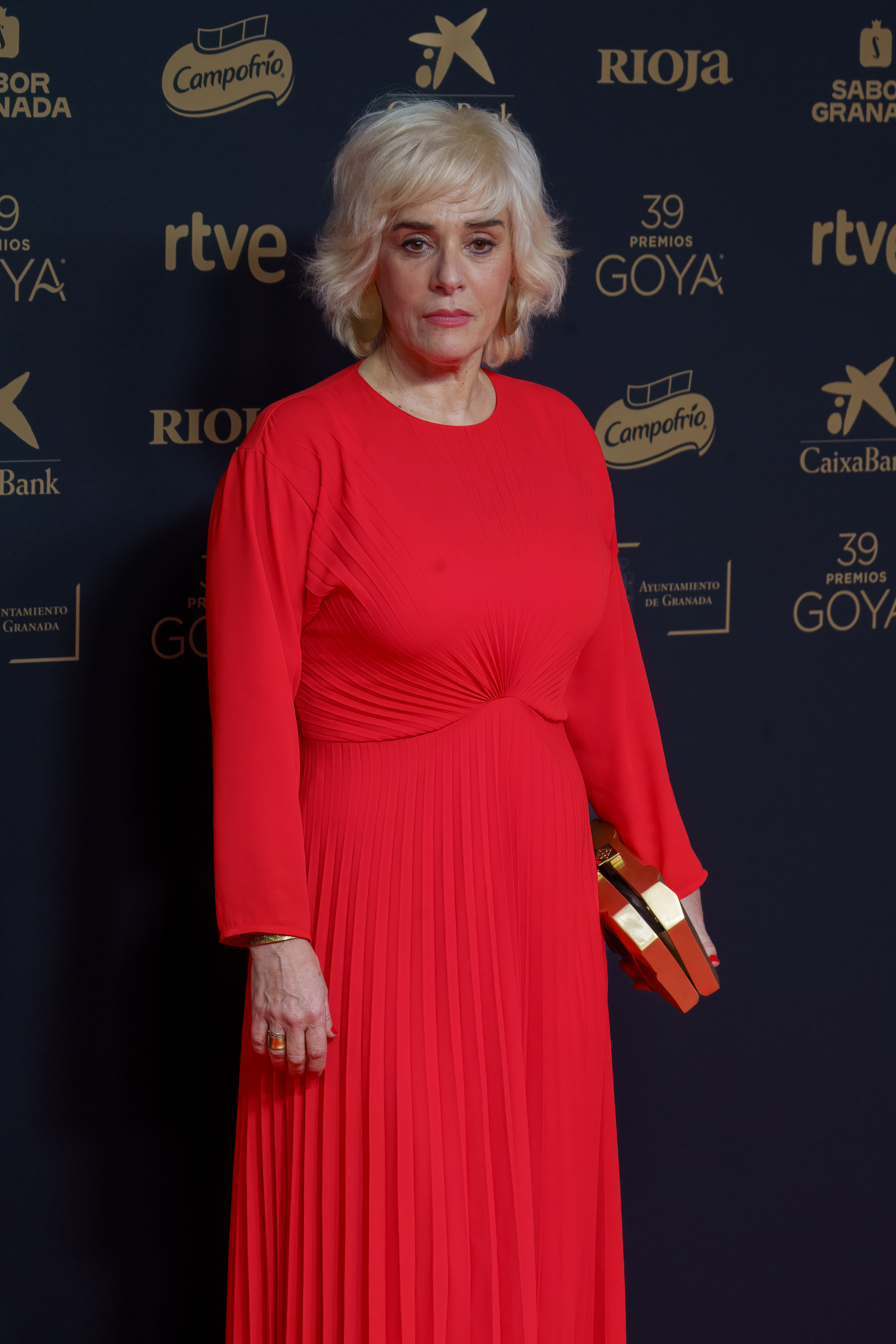
- Alonso on 2025
- Born: Ana Isabel Alonso Gómez; 11 November 1964 (age 61); Barakaldo, Biscay, Spain
- Years active: 1987–present
- Spouse: Heidi Steinhardt (m. 2020)
- Children: Igor

Ana Isabel Alonso Gómez (born 11 November 1964), better known as Anabel Alonso, is a Spanish actress and comedian who has appeared in theatre plays, movies and television shows, including the popular sitcom 7 Vidas and the animated film Finding Nemo (as the voice of Dory). She also hosted several different television programs.

== Main roles ==
Her best known role is arguably playing Diana Freire in the popular Spanish sitcom 7 Vidas, loosely based on the American sitcom Friends. In it, she played a naive second-rate actress that as time passes comes to realize her lesbianism. The portrayal of a lesbian character going against conventional stereotypes in prime time television led to Alonso becoming a gay icon. As 7 Vidas was a show known for introducing current (mostly Spanish-related, but not exclusively) topics in a comedy key, the character of Diana dealt with issues such as same-sex marriage or adoption by same-sex couples (including a powerful speech in one episode against people who reject gay adoption). Diana came across as a funny, klutzy, very sexual character, and was one of the longest-standing characters of the show.

Another well-known role of Alonso is her successful portrayal of the fish Dory in the European Spanish-language version of the movie Finding Nemo, for which she received rave reviews. She reprised her role in Finding Dory (2016).

Her father died on 28 February 2015 at the age of 89, while she was working on El Eunuco. In 2018 she replaced Silvia Abril during season 3 episode 14 in the TV program Cero en Historia.

== Selected filmography ==
- 1991
  - El robobo de la jojoya
- 1993
  - Kika
  - Tretas de mujer
- 1994
  - Amor propio
  - La leyenda de la doncella
  - Los hombres siempre mienten
- 1995
  - La boutique del llanto
  - Las cosas del querer II
  - Hotel y domicilio
  - Boca a boca
- 1996
  - Corazón loco
  - Pon un hombre en tu vida
  - Tu nombre envenena mis sueños
  - Los moños
  - El crimen del cine Oriente
  - Esposados (short movie)
- 1999
  - La mujer más fea del mundo
  - Camino de Santiago
- 2000 – Carne de gallina
- 2002 – Historia de un búho (short movie)
- 2003 – Finding Nemo (voice of Dory)
- 2007 – Ángeles S.A. Simona
- 2019 – Padre no hay más que uno as Directora

== Theatre plays ==
- Las troyanas (1984)
- Maribel y la extraña familia (1990)
- El lunático (1992)
- Los gatos (1992)
- Frankie y Johnny en el Clair de Lune (1997)
- Androcles y el león (1998)
- Un día cualquiera (1998)
- Confesiones de mujeres de 30 (2002–2003)

== Television shows ==
- La bola de cristal (1989)
- Primera función (1990)
- Venga el 91 (1990)
- Menos lobos (1992)
- Objetivo indiscreto (1992–1993)
- Habitación 503 (1993)
- El peor programa de la semana (1993)
- Los ladrones van a la oficina (1993)
- Contigo pan y cebolla (1997)
- El flechazo (1997)
- Mira quién viene esta noche (1997)
- Hermanas (1998)
- Un país maravilloso (1999)
- Secretos de Hollywood (1999)
- El camino de Santiago (1999)
- Condenadas a entenderse (1999)
- 7 Vidas (2000–2006)
- Estoy por ti (2005)
- Tal para cual (2006)
- Pelopicopata (2006)
- Distracción fatal (2006)
- La familia Mata (since 2007)
- Dicho y hecho (2018)
- Drag Race España (2022)

== Awards ==
- Fotograma de Plata Award in 1993 for Best TV Actress for Los ladrones van a la oficina.
- Primera Línea Award in 1993 for Revelation Actress for Kika.
- Best Actress Award in 1996 from the Movie Festival of Badajoz for Esposados.
- El Mundo Award for Best Basque Actress in 1998 for El crimen del cine Oriente.
- Best Actress Award from the Elche Independent Movie Festival in 2002 for Historia de un búho.
- Shan Gay magazine Award in 2002 for 7 vidas
- Fotogramas de Plata Award in 2003 for Best Theatre Actress for Confesiones de mujeres de 30
- Festival LesCaiCineMad'03 Best Actress Award for 7 vidas
- Telón de Oro Chivas in 2004 for Best Veteran Comedy Theatre actress for Confesiones de mujeres de 30
- Fotogramas de Plata Award-Nomination in 2004 for 7 vidas.
- Academia de Televisión Española Award-Nomination in 2004 and 2006 for 7 vidas.
