= Elena Santiago =

Spanish author (1936–2021)

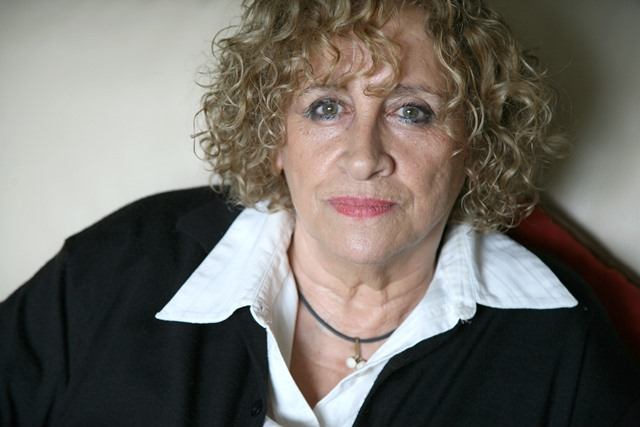
- Santiago in 2008
- Born: Elena Fernández Gómez; 8 February 1936; Veguellina de Órbigo, Castile and León, Spain
- Died: 3 January 2021 (aged 84); Valladolid, Spain
- Occupation: Writer
- Years active: 1973–2019
- Awards: Felipe Trigo Award (1983); Castile and León Award for Letters (2002)
- Website: www.elenasantiago.es

Elena Fernández Gómez (8 February 1936 – 3 January 2021), known by the pen name Elena Santiago, was a Spanish writer of novels, short stories and children's literature. She was the recipient of honors such as the Rosa Chacel Award, the 1999 Province of Valladolid Literary Prize, and the Castile and León Award for Letters.

== Biography ==
Santiago was born in Veguellina de Órbigo, Province of León, where her father, Apolinar Fernández Santiago, was a physician for more than 40 years. Her mother "despite many busy hours, read very continuously, and that was a tireless source of wonders, reading and writing." Her early education was in her home town, and at the age of nine, she continued her studies in León, at the Colegio de la Asunción. Santiago then began teacher training and took Literature Studies, first in León and then in Madrid, where she "changed her life". From the beginning she wanted to dedicate herself to writing, painting, playing the piano, studying languages, and letters. Santiago began publishing in her teens.

Her first two publications, selected by Temas magazine, were short stories entitled "El Hijo" and "Historia sobre el terremoto de Perú". From then, she continued to publish poetry, short stories, poetic prose, novels, and children's literature.

I write and write. My memory does not stop and my time does not either. Whether it is journalism or literature (my mind chooses some imagined variants) it accompanies me in everything that is life. The language. Seeing beyond ... and the thought and the sensations, ready.

— Elena Santiago

Santiago began receiving awards with her first publications in 1973. Her first three novels, La oscuridad somos nosotros (1976), Ácidos días (1979), and Gente oscura (1980), received, respectively, the City of Irún, Novelas y Cuentos, and Miguel Delibes Awards. In her literary career she alternated novels with short stories, dedicating periods to the latter genre "out of the need to tell stories." Some of her short stories were collected under the title Lo tuyo soy yo in 2004.

She spent eight years to 2009 writing children's literature, during which period she experienced health and family problems. This writing was recognized with honors including the Rosa Chacel Award and the Castile and León Award for Letters. In 2009 she wrote La muerte y las cerezas.

She died at the age of 79 on 3 January 2021 in Valladolid, Spain.

== Study of her literary work ==
Santiago's work has been studied in the context of the Congress of Contemporary Literature and as a 20th-century women novelist. It is the subject of the doctoral thesis by Muriel Taján, with the title Mythe personnel et écriture dans l'oeovre d'Elena Santiago, Évolutions et involutions d'une quête de l'absante (2009). Taján also authored the prologue to the novel Nunca el ovido, which Santiago published in 2015, after a gap of six years.

== Collective works ==
Santiago collaborated on collective works, such as Cuentos de este siglo, Cien años de cuento, El Faro, Miguel Delibes, and Jorge Guillén. She participated with 15 other authors in the project Contemos la Navidad, an anthology of stories and Christmas illustrations in homage to Antonio Pereira, which is published annually. The project is coordinated by José Ignacio García García. The 2013 edition was a tribute to Santiago in which her daughter and granddaughter, who is the author of one of the stories, participated. Another project on which Santiago collaborated compiles traditional folktales narrated by voices of Castile and León. She also contributed to the collective book Inmenso estrecho. Cuentos sobre inmigración (2005), contains the story "Finalmente, ¿una oscuridad?", a work in solidarity with immigrants in which she advocates the need to move towards a multicultural society.

== Works ==
- Un camino amarillo, La última puerta, Las horas quietas and Cada invierno (1973–1975), short stories
- La oscuridad somos nosotros (1976)
- Un mundo detrás de la puerta, El ruido, Antes de cerrar la puerta (1977), short stories
- Ácidos días (1979)
- Gente oscura (1980)
- Una mujer malva (1980)
- Manuela y el mundo (1983)
- Alguien sube (1985)
- Relato con lluvia (1986), short stories
- Veva (1988)
- El amante asombrado (1994)
- Amor quieto (1997)
- Cuentos (1997)
- Ángeles oscuros (1998)
- Un susto azul (1998), short stories
- Asomada al invierno (2001)
- Olas bajo la ciudad (2003), short stories
- Sueños de mariposa negra (2003), children's literature
- Lo tuyo soy yo (2004)
- La muerte y las cerezas (2009)
- Nunca el olvido (2015)
- Mat y Pat. Vuelos de niño (2018), children's literature
- Los delirios de Andrea (2019)

== Awards and recognitions ==
- 1973: City of León Award
- 1974: Ignacio Aldecoa Award (4th place)
- 1974: City of San Sebastián Award
- 1975: Ignacio Aldecoa Award (1st place)
- 1976: Lena Award
- 1976: City of Irún Award
- 1977: Jauja Award
- 1977: Calderón Escalada Award
- 1979: Novelas y Cuentos Award
- 1980: La Felguera Award
- 1980: Miguel Delibes Narrative Award
- 1981: City of Barbastro Award
- 1981: Hucha de Plata and Hucha de Oro Awards
- 1983: Felipe Trigo Award
- 1985: Ateneo de Valladolid Award
- 1991: A plaza named for her in Veguellina de Órbigo
- 1998: Rosa Chacel Award
- 1999: Literary Career Award, from the Diputación de Valladolid
- 2002: Castile and León Award for Letters
- 2003: Named Favorite Daughter of Veguellina de Órbigo
