= Poachers (film) =

- Theatrical release poster
- Spanish: Furtivos
- Directed by: José Luis Borau
- Written by: Manuel Gutiérrez Aragón; José Luis Borau
- Produced by: José Luis Borau
- Starring: Lola Gaos; Ovidi Montllor; Alicia Sánchez; José Luis Borau
- Cinematography: Luis Cuadrado
- Edited by: Ana Romero Marchent
- Music by: Vainica Doble
- Production company: Imán Films
- Release date: 8 September 1975
- Running time: 99 minutes
- Country: Spain
- Language: Spanish
- Box office: $2,145,429

Poachers (Spanish: Furtivos) is a 1975 Spanish film directed by José Luis Borau. It stars Lola Gaos, Ovidi Montllor and Alicia Sánchez. The script was written by Manuel Gutiérrez Aragón and José Luis Borau. The film is a stark drama that portraits an oedipal relationship and its dire consequences. A great critical and commercial success, it won best picture at the San Sebastián International Film Festival in 1975. The film was selected as the Spanish entry for the Best Foreign Language Film at the 48th Academy Awards, but was not accepted as a nominee. Furtivos is considered a classic of Spanish cinema.

== Plot ==
Ángel, a soft-spoken withdrawn man, lives an isolated life in a rustic farmhouse in the woodlands around Segovia. His only company is his brash, domineering mother, Martina. Ángel is an "alimañero", a hunter in charge of killing wolves and other animals of prey in order to protect deer in a hunting wild reserve. To survive, he resorts to furtive deception of the local civil guards hunting the wild game and selling the meat and skins for profit. During the autumn hunting season, the local Governor comes to hunt stag with his entourage taking base at Ángel's rustic house. The Governor has special affection towards Martina, who was his wet nurse.

Ángel goes to the provincial capital to buy traps, rope and nooses. He has killed a wolf taking the skin to sell it. In town, he is smitten with a young woman, Milagros, who is looking for a way out of her troubles. Milagros is the girlfriend of a well-known delinquent nicknamed "El Cuqui". She has escaped from the local reformatory for girls, hoping to run away with her lover. With no money and still wearing the reformatory's uniform, she notices Ángel eating his lunch in the street and boldly seduces him, taking him for a fool. Ángel buys her new clothes, and after spending a clandestine evening in an out of the way hotel, he invites her to return to the forest with him. Initially reluctant, Milagros eventually leaves with him on a bus towards the forest.

Meanwhile, Martina has been busy entertaining the childish and irritating Governor, who has come with some friends to hunt deer. Upset with her son's delay in town, Martina is furious when she sees him arriving with a girl in tow. She takes out her misplaced anger on a trapped she-wolf. Martina savagely kills the defenceless animal with an axe. Milagros plan is to leave soon, hiding out from the authorities until El Cuqui comes to look for her, but Ángel, in spite of his mother's opposition, is determined that she stays with him. During the hunting expedition, the Governor shoots at a deer with no success, and as the animal is about to get away, Ángel, in another part of the forest, kills the animal; and drags it out of sight. Initially Ángel tries to hide the presence of the runaway girl from the Governor, but Martina, who is jealous, makes Milagros come to the notice of the governor. Martina's plan to get rid of Milagros backfires. Instead of returning her to the reformatory, the governor agrees to let her free as Ángel wants to marry the wayward girl. He would be now responsible for her.

Martina is beside herself with anger. Milagros now has taken her place next to Ángel in the only bed of the house, implying that mother and son had had an incestuous relationship. Ángel is oblivious to his mother's fury. He is happy with Milagros, who tries to be accommodating and begins to be genuinely fond of him.

Eventually, El Cuqui returns sooner than expected, and Milagros, although now attached to Ángel, still plans to run off. Meanwhile, the local police discover El Cuqui's presence in the forest. The Governor, whose hunting expedition has been interrupted by El Cuqui, asks Ángel to track him down since he is the most familiar with the area. He pursues him and finds him, but lets him go because Milagros has promised to stay with him if her lover is spared from jail. El Cuqui escapes. When Ángel returns home, Martina tells her son that Milagros has fled as well, taking her few belongings with her. Desperate, Ángel goes back to the forest to look for her, but he can not find her. Martina tries to console him as she helps him take off his wet clothes.

At first, Ángel is distraught, but life goes on. Peering into the attic of Martina's home, the Governor has discovered deer skins that Ángel has poached. Embarrassed by these findings, the Governor eventually names Ángel a Forest Guard in order to discourage his illegal hunting. Ángel begins to prosper. However, he is still obsessed by Milagros' disappearance. By chance, he meets face to face with El Cuqui, who, to Ángel's surprise, demands to know where Milagros is. Realizing that she did not escape with El Cuqui, Ángel searches their room, finding a box with some of Milagros' nostalgic possessions that she would have never left behind. He finally realizes that Martina, out of jealousy, has killed his wife. He remains calm and tells his mother that the next day, they would go to church. Ángel wears his forest guard uniform and takes his mother to mass. Martina takes communion, and at Ángel's insistence, she also receives the sacrament of confession. On their way home from the Sunday church service; Ángel shoots her in the back in a field of snow.

== Cast ==
While Lola Gaos was set from the start to play Martina, Borau considered Ángela Molina and Mariano Haro, for the starring roles. Alicia Sánchez was an unknown actress from the theater. Ovidi Montllor was a famous singer. The success of Furtivos allowed him to have a parallel career as an actor. When José Luis López Vázquez declined the role of the Governor, Manuel Gutiérrez Aragón persuaded Borau to play it.

- Lola Gaos as Martina
- Ovidi Montllor as Ángel
- Alicia Sánchez as Milagros
- José Luis Borau as Santiago, the provincial Governor
- Felipe Solano as El Cuqui
- Ismael Merlo as the priest

== Title ==
The word Furtivos has two meanings in Spanish: people hunting game illegally (poachers) and somebody who harbor secret thoughts. The director's intention was to imply both. For Borau the film is about secrets and persecution. He explained that before looking for it in a dictionary, he only associated the word furtivo with something done in secrecy. The English translation of the title, Poachers, does not capture the full meaning of the original. Borau explained: "I wanted to show that under Franco, Spain was living a secret life. Virtually everyone in this film is a Furtivo."

== Production ==
The script was written by film director and screenwriter Manuel Gutiérrez Aragón and José Luis Borau. The idea behind the film was born out of the character of Angel, the poacher, which was based on a real man who lived and hunt illegally in Cabuérniga Cantabria. The character of the mother, Martina, originated with the actress who was cast for the role, Lola Gaos. Borau was impressed after seeing Gaos play the role of Saturnina, a cynical maid, in Luis Buñuel's film Tristana (1970). Borau mixed the reference to that character with Goya's painting Saturn Devouring His Son. Hence came the plot line of a female Saturn, a dominating mother, an incestuous tormentor of her son.

Furtivos was Borau's fourth feature film and the first he was able to make with artistic freedom. The film was made in 1975, just before Francisco Franco's death. The original idea was to use as location El Bosque del Saja, (The Woodland of Saja) where the real hunter that inspired the story lived, but the director found that those woods, where wolves live, were not right for filming. They do not give the right cinematic look and are too intricate with thick bushes to allow the actors to move and the light to come in. Several different locations were used. The film was shot in the north of the province of Madrid in El Hayedo de Montejo and some other locations around Navarrete, near Segovia and in the Pyrenees for the snowy locations. The exteriors shots in the forest were difficult to film because of the constantly changing weather conditions. The film was made with a budget of two hundred thousand dollars.

Borau was not only director, but also screenwriter, producer and actor. The scenes in which he plays Santiago, the local governor, were directed by his co-scriptwriter Manuel Gutiérrez Aragón. The poster was made by Ivan Zulueta. It depicts Martina as a big monster overpowering her son with her huge paws.

It was a standard practice in Spanish film of the time to post sync the actors recording their lines in the studio in post-production. The voices of Ángel and the governor were not dubbed by the actors who played those roles. Ovidi Montllor, Ángel, had a thick Valencian accent, unsuitable for a character supposedly born and bred in northern Spain. The governor played by Borau was dubbed by dubbing actor Rafael Penagos whose high-toned pitch voice was preferred to Borau's gruffer tones. Alicia Sánchez was also dubbed by a different actress. Only Lola Gaos' real raspy voice was kept.

== Reception ==
=== Box office ===
The harshness of the story, its simple narrative, and the erotic elements in it captured the attention of the public. The film was a great commercial success. Furtivos became the top-grossing film in Spain in 1976, netting some three million dollars.

Furtivos was Borau's fourth feature film and the first he was able to make with artistic freedom. It remains his highest grossing success and the one for which he is often remembered.

=== Critical response ===
Furtivos is also notable for the cinematography by Luis Cuadrado, whose chiaroscuro effects for the film were inspired by the paintings of El Greco and Jusepe de Ribera. The look and pacing of the film follows the styles of John Ford and Alfred Hitchcock, the hallowed directors admired by Borau.

The film earned critical praised from among others Vargas Llosa, Francisco Umbral, and Julián Marías. Critical praise was not unanimous and the film was attacked by sympathizers of Franco's regime. It also offended animal rights advocates in Spain for the scene in which Martina clubs a trapped she wolf with a shovel.

=== Awards and nominations ===
Furtivos premiered at the San Sebastian Film Festival where it won the first prize Golden Shell as best film.

It also won, in 1975:

- Cinema Writers Circle Awards, Best Film and Best actress (Lola Gaos)
- Golden Shell, Best Film at the San Sebastián International Film Festival

The film was selected as the Spanish entry for the Best Foreign Language Film at the 48th Academy Awards, but was not accepted as a nominee.

== Analysis ==
Underneath its rural and realistic presentation; Furtivos is at the same time a tragedy and a fairy tale. The film is an allegorical criticism of the social order under Franco. Santiago, the local governor, evokes the figure of Franco, who was known to be a keen huntsman. The petulant, narcissist, infantile behaviors of the governor towards Martina, his former wet nurse, suggest the senility of the dictator who was approaching death when the film was made. His intrusiveness in the life of Martina and her son can be viewed as the attempts of the Francoist forces to repress and control the desires of a nation.

Beneath the social themes lie the motif of incest and the image of the cruel and vicious Martina. She represents the unwinding matriarchal structure that belies Spanish traditional machismo. In its presentation of an all domineering mother the films brings to mind Alfred Hitchcock's Psycho. The mother son relationship is the key element in the film's depiction of patterns of abuse. There is not only Martina's exploitation and sexual abuse of her son, the physiological violence to which Martina subjects her son, but her savage butchering of the captive wolf, who suffers her displace ire over Milagro's intrusion in her relationship with Angel. "Spain is a cruel mother who devours her children and Furtivos is a cruel film", Borau explained.

The film follows a simple structure and is told as a Fairy tale. Using allegorical characters typical in fairy stories: a king, the local governor who Martina calls in the film my king, a hunter, Ángel, a witch, Martina, a princess in danger, Milagros, and the lurking scenario of the woods, where the action of the film takes place. In one scene Martina is called a witch. She calls the governor "my king". Like in children tales Milagros gets lost in the forest.

== Controversy ==
Furtivos was made at the time in the last days of Franco's life, and it was released when the Francoist censorship was still in place. The film directly challenged Franco's censorship policies with its scenes of stark violence, explicit nudity, its depiction of amoral characters and its display of the degeneration of the existing political regime. The director fought vigorously with the censors, first to have the film made, and later to release it as he had intended without cuts. He refused to the censor's demands to cut some of the aspects of the character of the governor, scenes at the girl's reformatory, and Milagros' woodlands striptease. Borau's battles with the censors paved the way for many other Spanish film directors to deal with controversial themes without fear of censorship.

Although the film is based on an actual event, it is considered one of the cruellest stories in Spanish Cinema. The realization of the incestuous relationship between Angel and his mother, especially when she is finally dragged and torn out of their bed to make room for Milagros, is considered one of the most startling scenes in Spanish Cinema. Also memorable is Martina's taking her aggressions out on animals, beating a trapped she wolf to death with an axe. Also disturbing is the scene when Angel shoots Martina without remorse just as he had killed a beautiful wild stag, the governor's coveted but elusive prize, during one of his hunting excursions.

== See also ==
- List of submissions to the 48th Academy Awards for Best Foreign Language Film
- List of Spanish submissions for the Academy Award for Best Foreign Language Film
