= Ismael Grasa =

Spanish writer (born 1968)

Ismael Grasa (born 1968) is a Spanish writer. He was born in Huesca, and studied philosophy in Pamplona and Madrid. He has published in a variety of genres, spanning both fiction and non-fiction. He spent some time teaching Spanish in China, which became the basis for his novel Días en China. He has also appeared as an actor in several films by David Trueba. Grasa currently lives in Zaragoza where he continues to write.

== Selected works ==
- La esforzada disciplina del aristócrata, winner of the Premio Félix Urabayen de Novela Corta
- De Madrid al cielo, winner of the Premio Tigre Juan, and nominated for the Premio Herralde
- Trescientos días de sol (short stories, Xordica, 2007), winner of the Premio Ojo Crítico
- Sicilia (travel, El Cobre, 2000)
