= Dolores Soler-Espiauba =

Spanish novelist

Dolores Soler-Espiauba Conesa (born Cartagena, Spain, 1935) is a Spanish writer, winning awards for her novels.

== Biography ==
Having studied German and Spanish Philology at the Complutense University of Madrid, Soler-Esiauba began work as a teacher in Portugal, France and Poland. In 1974 she moved to Brussels, Belgium, where she worked as a translator and teacher for the European Union. Her first novel, Los Canardos, was published late in 1987, for which she received the Premio Felipe Trigo. Later she would win the same prize for Woman with a Landscape of Rain (Mujer con paisaje de lluvia) in 1988.

Soler-Espiauba has also received the Premio Andalucía de Novela for Sister Ana, What Do You See?, the Premio Azorín in 1991, the Premio Café Gijón in 1992 and the Premio Gabriel Miró de Cuentos in 2007 for The Tomb of King Baltasar.

== Works ==
=== Novels ===
- Los Canardos, (1987), VII Premio Felipe Trigo.
- Woman with a Landscape of Rain (Mujer con paisaje de lluvia), (1988), VIII Premio Felipe Trigo.
- Chronicles of Oblivion (Crónica del olvido), (1988), Premio Café Iruña.
- Sister Ana, What Do You See? (Hermana Ana, ¿Qué ves?), (1990) V Premio Andalucía
- Elisa or the Imperfect Past (Elisa o el pasado imperfecto), (1992), Premio Azorín de Novela
- The Gold and the Moor. Alicante (El oro y el moro. Alicante), (1992), Premio Café Gijón
- The Blackberry Stain (La mancha de la mora) (1997).

=== Short stories ===
- Twelve Roses for Rose (Doce rosas para Rosa), (1989).
- The Thief with the Black Glove (Ladrón de guante negro), (1989).
- More Was Lost in Cuba (Más se perdió en Cuba), (1995).
- Moors and Christians (Moros y Cristianos), (1995).
- ...But Brunettes Marry Themselves (...Pero se casan con las morenas), (1995).
- More Shells than a Tortoise (Más conchas que un galápago), (1998).
- Guantanameras, (1997).
- A Taxi towards Coyoacán (Un taxi hacia Coyoacán), (1998).
- Mirta and the Old Master (Mirta y el viejo señor), (1998).
- Life is a Tango (La vida es un tango), (1998).
- The Tomb of King Baltasar (La tumba del rey Baltasar), (2007).
