= Nathalie Seseña =

Spanish actress

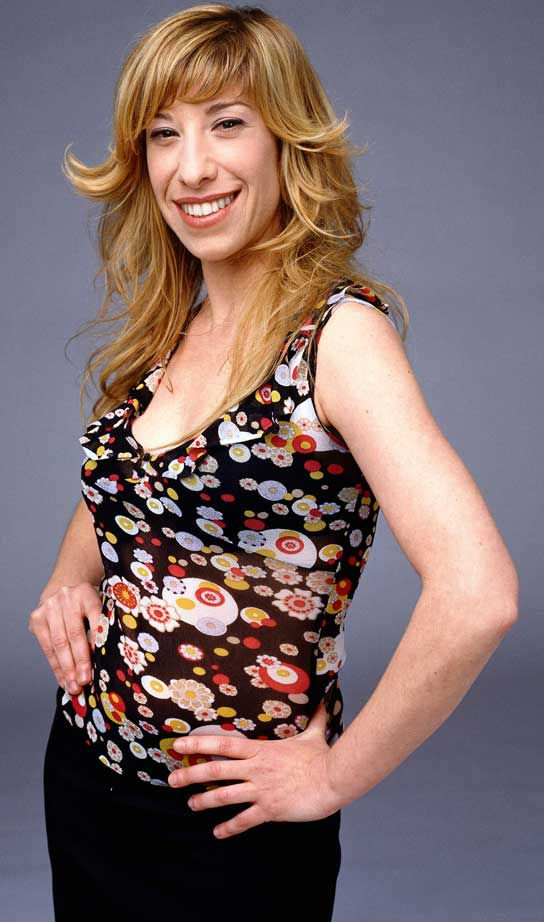
- Born: Nathalie Denise Ronse Seseña; 11 November 1967 (age 58); Madrid, Spain
- Education: École Philippe Gaulier
- Occupation: Actress
- Spouse: José María de la Peña

Nathalie Denise Ronse Seseña (born 11 November 1967) is a Spanish actress. She began young, appearing in the children's series Celia and has become noted for her role in the TV series La que se avecina since 2007 playing Berta Escobar. She has appeared in films such as Killer Housewives (2001), Cásate conmigo, Maribel (2002), Todo menos la chica (2002), Lo mejor que le puede pasar a un cruasán (2003) and El chocolate del loro (2004). In 2013 she adopted a dog named Pepe, and both go to the filming.

In 2018 Seseña and Miryam Gallego sponsored Kotou, a clothes brand in Senegal.Seseñ trained under Philippe Gaulier at École Philippe Gaulier in France.

== Filmography ==
- Alegre ma non troppo (1990)
- Dile a Laura que la quiero (1994)
- Palace (1994)
- El día de la Bestia (1995)
- La Celestina (1996)
- La duquesa roja (1995)
- Airbag (1996)
- Dame algo (1996)
- Agujetas en el alma (1997)
- Atómica (1997)
- Matame mucho (1997)
- Casate conmigo Maribel (1998)
- Shacky Carmine (1999)
- Todos menos la chica (1999)
- Carne de gallina (2000)
- Canícula (2000)
- Killer Housewives (2001)
- Lo mejor que le puede pasar a un cruasán (2003)
- El chocolate del loro (2004)
- Herederos de la bestia (2016)

== Theatre ==
- El retablillo de D. Cristóbal (1997)
- Comedia (1988)
- Locos de amor (1991)
- Fiesta barroca (1992)
- Don Juán último (1992)
- El innombrable (1998)
- Los invasores del palacio

== Television ==
- Las chicas de hoy en día (1990)
- Una gloria nacional (1991)
- Celia (1992)
- Farmacia de guardia (1993)
- Videos de primera (1993)
- Que loca peluquería (1994)
- La consulta de la dra. delgado (1995)
- Confidencias (1996)
- Andalucia un siglo de fascinación (1996)
- Menudo es mi padre (1997)
- Jacinto durante (1999)
- Ellas son así (1999)
- El club de la comedia (1999)
- ¡Ala...Dina! (2000)
- Demoda (2006)
- La que se avecina (2007–present)
