= Celia, lo que dice =

- First edition cover, 1929
- Author: Elena Fortún
- Illustrator: Molina Gallent
- Language: Spanish
- Series: "Celia y su mundo"
- Genre: children's novel, drama
- Publisher: Manuel Aguilar
- Publication date: 1929
- Publication place: Spain
- Media type: Print (Hardback & Paperback)
- Pages: 223
- ISBN: 84-206-3575-8
- Followed by: Celia en el colegio (1932)

Celia, lo que dice ("What Celia Says" or literally, "Celia, What She Says") is the first in the series of children's novels by Spanish author Elena Fortún. The novel is a collection of short stories first published in magazines in 1929. The stories, which were written from the perspective of a seven-year-old girl named Celia Gálvez de Montalbán, narrated the life of the protagonist living in Madrid with her family. Celia, who was an extremely popular character from her first appearance through the 1960s, was characterized as a girl who often questioned the world around her in ways that were both ingenuous and innocent. The novel was followed by several sequels through the 1930s and the 1950s, the last one published in 1987, thirty-five years after the death of the author. The first of these sequels was Celia en el colegio, first published in 1932. The series were both popular and successful during the time following their publication, and are today considered classics of Spanish literature. The first three novels were adapted for television in 1992, in a series produced by José Luis Borau entitled Celia, which starred Cristina Cruz Mínguez in the title role.
