= Tigre Juan Award =

Spanish literary award

- Awarded for: Unpublished novella (1978–1989); Unpublished novel (2004–2007); First published narrative work (1990–2003, 2008–present)
- Location: Oviedo, Spain
- First award: 1978

The Tigre Juan Award (Spanish: Premio Tigre Juan) is a Spanish literary award created in 1977 in honor of the novel Tigre Juan. El curandero de su honra by Ramón Pérez de Ayala. It is awarded to the best narrative work in Spanish published in the preceding year. It has had different sponsors: the founders, the Cervantes Bookstore, the Asturian Center, the City Council of Oviedo (1986–2009) and the Tribuna Ciudadana cultural association.

== History ==
The award was conceived with the aim of rewarding the best unpublished novella – regardless of whether the author was established or unknown – with input from Oviedo cultural figures such as Emilio Alarcos Llorach, Juan Benito Argüelles, Juan Cueto, José María Martínez Cachero, Belarmino Álvarez Otero, Jaime Herrero, and Pepe Grossi (who all joined the Tribuna Ciudadana cultural association which was instituted three years later).

It was presented for the first time at the Tigre Juan pub, located at Calle Mon No. 16, a meeting place for artists in the old area of Oviedo that was owned by Álvarez Otero, the award's first sponsor.

In 1986, the Municipal Culture Foundation of the City Council took over the award, expanding its monetary prize and providing it with an organizational infrastructure in order to achieve a greater national presence. Four years later the bases of the contest were modified in order to reward the best first published narrative work, and made the award into the first one that supported, in addition to the author, the publisher who was taking a risk on a writer's first work. Its winners were generally young (although the 26th edition was won by 74-year-old filmmaker and novelist José Luis Borau).

This second stage, in which the award achieved its greatest prominence, lasted until 2003. A new change in the bases led to awards from 2004 to 2007 for unpublished novels by established or well-known authors, but in 2008 it resumed the modality of awarding the best first narrative work in Spanish.

The first endowment of this award was 100,000 pesetas; the 2009 award was €54,000 (€40,000 for the author and the rest for the publisher). The award was canceled in January and was delivered in May of the following year during the Oviedo Book Fair. In November 2009, citing the 2008 financial crisis as a reason, the city council announced that it was suspending its financing. Now the prize – a statuette inspired by an engraving by the Asturian artist Jaime Herrero and representing the character Tigre Juan – is given in the autumn and has no financial endowment.

The award was given in 2010 and 2011 at the Palacio de Meres, and in 2012 at the Traslaburra restaurant in Oviedo.

== Winners ==
- 1978, José Luis Mediavilla for Jonás (later published by KRK Ediciones)
- 1979, Luis Marañón for Ojos en la noche (later self-published by the author)
- 1980, Ignacio Bellido for Jardín de Orates (later published by the Cervantes Bookstore and Ediciones del Serbal)
- 1981, Carmen Gómez Ojea for Otras mujeres y Fabia (later published by Argos Vergara)
- 1982, José María Rodríguez Méndez for Cosas de la transición (later published by Argos Vergara)
- 1983, Santiago Araúz de Robles for La agonía florida de Carlos Brito (later published by Argos Vergara)
- 1984, Antonio Pérez Henares for La cruzada del perro (later published by Júcar)
- 1985, José Luis Muñoz Jimeno for El cadáver bajo el jardín (later published by Júcar)
- 1986, José Ignacio Gracia Noriega for El viaje del obispo de Abisinia a los Santuarios de la Cristiandad (later published by Júcar)
- 1987, Julia Ibarra for Sasia la viuda (later published by Júcar)
- 1988, Luis Sepúlveda for Un viejo que leía novelas de amor (later published by Júcar)
- 1989, Antonio Belmonte for La armada invendible (later published by Júcar)
- 1990, Martín Casariego for Qué te voy a contar, Anagrama
- 1991, Francisco Casavella for El triunfo, Versal
- 1992, Enriqueta Antolín for La gata con alas, Alfaguara
- 1993, Belén Gopegui for La escala de los mapas, Anagrama
- 1994, Vicente Gallego for Cuentos de un escritor sin éxito, Pretextos
- 1995, Ismael Grasa for De Madrid al cielo, Anagrama
- 1996, Tino Pertierra for Los seres heridos, Ediciones Nobel
- 1997, Antonio Orejudo for Fabulosas narraciones por historias, Lengua de Trapo
- 1998, Imma Monsó for Nunca se sabe, Tusquets
- 1999, Fernando Palazuelos for La trastienda azul, Lengua de Trapo
- 2000, Rodrigo Brunori for Me manda Stradivarius, Debate
- 2001, Pablo Tusset for Lo mejor que le puede pasar a un cruasán, Lengua de Trapo
- 2002, Manuel Moyano for El amigo de Kafka (short stories), Pretextos
- 2003, José Luis Borau for Camisa de once varas (short stories), Alfaguara
- 2004, Blanca Riestra for El sueño de Borges (later published by Algaida)
- 2005, Raúl Argemí for Siempre la misma música (later published by Algaida)
- 2006, Esther Bendahan for La cara de Marte (later published by Algaida)
- 2007, David Torres for Niños de tiza (later published by Algaida)
- 2009, Óscar Calavia for Las botellas del señor Klein, Lengua de Trapo
- 2010, Jon Bilbao for Bajo el influjo del cometa (short stories), Salto de Página
- 2011, Iñaki Uriarte for Diarios, 1999-2003, Pepita de Calabazas (finalist: Óscar Esquivias with Pampanitos verdes)
- 2012, Mario Martín Gijón for Inconvenientes del turismo en Praga y otros cuentos europeos, KRK (finalist: Pablo Gutiérrez with Ensimismada correspondencia, Lengua de Trapo)
- 2013, ex aequo: Marta Sanz for Daniela Astor y la caja negra, Anagrama and Sergio del Molino for La hora violeta, Mondadori (finalist: Yuri Herrera for La transmigración de los cuerpos, Periférica)
- 2014, Jeremías Gamboa for Contarlo todo, Mondadori (finalist: Selva Almada for Ladrilleros, Mar dulce)
- 2015, Samanta Schweblin for Distancia de rescate (finalist: Chus Fernández for Sin música)
- 2016, Gonzalo Hidalgo Bayal for Nemo (finalist: Juan José Becerra for El espectáculo del tiempo)
- 2017, Pedro Mairal for La uruguaya (finalist: Juan Gómez Bárcena for Kanada)
- 2018, Tomás Sánchez Santiago for Años de mayor cuantía (finalist: Pablo Matilla for La sabiduría de quebrar huesos)
- 2019, Cristian Crusat for Bandera de España por Sujeto elíptico
