= Luís Blanco Vila =

Spanish journalist (1936–2023)

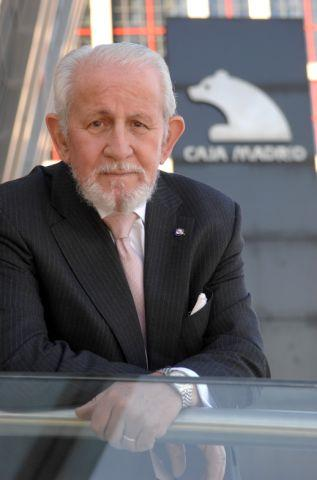
Image of Luis Blanco Vila

Luís Blanco Vila (9 November 1936 – 31 December 2023) was a Spanish journalist. He died on 31 December 2023, at the age of 87.

== Publications ==
- "Madrid al paso: un paseo cultural" – Ensayo (1976)
- "De las costumbres económicas de los españoles" – Ensayo (1977)
- "El Correo Gallego: 100 años de aportación a la historia 1878-1978" – Historia (1978)
- "Dos días antes y otras antiguallas" – Novela corta y cuentos - Premio Café Gijón 1975 (1982).
- "Para leer a Camilo José Cela" – Crítica literaria (1991).
- “Domestico de Lujo" – Novela - (1992)
- "Diálogo con las sombras" - Novela - Premio Felipe Trigo 1991 (1992).
- "La crisis de las ideas en el fin-de-siglo" – Crítica literaria (1995).
- "Memorias de un gato tonto" – Novela infantil (1996).
- "La literatura del siglo XX" – Crítica literaria (1999).
- "El Último Vuelo del Principito" – Novela (2000).
- "La Literatura Contada Con Sencillez" – Crítica literaria (2002).
- "Literatura y existencia. Ensayo metodológico de Literatura Contemporánea Comparada" – Crítica literaria (2013).
- "La Caza del Cordero: Novela sin Remedio" - Novela (2021).
- "La Aceptación del Tiempo Presente" - Ensayo (2023).
- "Cuando la luz acabe, mensajero" - Poesía (2023).
