= Celia (Spanish TV series) =

- Series' opening title
- Also known as: El mundo de Celia
- Genre: Children's television
- Based on: Celia, lo que dice and Celia en el colegio by Elena Fortún
- Developed by: José Luis Borau
- Written by: José Luis Borau; Carmen Martín Gaite
- Directed by: José Luis Borau
- Starring: Cristina Cruz Mínguez; Ana Duato; Pedro Díez del Corral
- Narrated by: Cristina Cruz Mínguez
- Theme music composer: Carmen Santonja; Gloria van Aerssen
- Opening theme: "Hay en madrid una niña"
- Country of origin: Spain
- Original language: Spanish
- No. of seasons: 1
- No. of episodes: 6

Production
- Executive producer: José López Rodero
- Production locations: Madrid, Spain
- Cinematography: Magín Torruella
- Running time: 49–58 minutes
- Production company: Televisión Española

Original release
- Network: La Primera
- Release: 5 January – 9 February 1993

Celia is a Spanish children's television series created by José Luis Borau for Televisión Española (TVE). It is based on the classic Spanish children's novels of the same name by Elena Fortún, primarily Celia, lo que dice (1929) and Celia en el colegio (1932). The books and television series tell the stories of a playful seven-year-old girl named Celia Gálvez de Moltanbán. In addition to focusing on Celia, the show touched lightly on Spanish life in the 1930s, such as the upcoming civil war, a changing nation, and the social issues and ideas at the time.

Cristina Cruz Mínguez was cast as the titular character, and the script was adapted by author and screenwriter Carmen Martín Gaite. The creator, Borau, directed and produced the series. Though successful when it originally premiered, Celia was cancelled after six episodes. The sixth and final episode ended with a "to be continued" (Continuará), but the following episode was never released.

== Production ==
After the "Celia" books by Elena Fortún had been brought to his attention by Spanish author and screenwriter Carmen Martín Gaite, director and producer José Luis Borau insisted on together creating a television adaptation of Fortún's works; Gaite was not convinced and was not sure the project would work. When the project was finally green-lit by Televisión Española (TVE), a search began for a seven-year-old girl to play the title role of Celia; then-inexperienced Cristina Cruz Mínguez was chosen out of over 2,000 girls who auditioned for the part, though some sources suggested that around 3,000 girls auditioned. Many of the girls not chosen to play the title role were instead cast as other characters in the series, such as María Teresa, Celia's friend. A television documentary was produced, entitled "Buscando a Celia" ("Searching for Celia"), which showed the process of finding the right "Celia"; the documentary contained brief interviews with many different girls and some of their parents as well. When broadcast, the short documentary served as publicity for the upcoming series.

Director José Luis Borau stated during the premiere ceremony of the series that he had had two reasons for his production: One, to pay homage to Elena Fortún, whom he described as one of the most important authors the children of Spain possibly ever had; and two, that the children of Spain "must be given the best. We mustn't take advantage of them, we mustn't trick them, we mustn't give them just anything. Because they deserve the best." Gaite expressed her amazement at young actress Cristina Cruz Mínguez's professional behaviour during the filming of the series: "I remember one scene", she said, "that was filmed very late at night in a circus close to El Escorial, and I didn't hear this girl complain one single time. She didn't ask where her mother was or anything." During the last minutes, the microphone was handed to Mínguez herself, who thanked Gaite and Borau for their help during the production of Celia.

=== Theme song ===
The series' theme song, composed by the Spanish duo Vainica Doble, does not have an official name, but it is often referred to as "Celia" or "Hay en Madrid una niña" ("There is in Madrid a girl"); its basic lyrics and music are based on the classic Spanish playground song, "En Cádiz hay una niña" (In Cádiz there is a girl"). Though the song is in Spanish, there are brief instances of English and Latin; the English line, "Be quiet, you are a naughty girl!" is presumably sung by the character of Miss Nelly, the English governess. The complete series' opening is a montage of drawings of Celia by one of the original illustrators of the novels, Francisco Molina Gallent.

== Cast ==
- Cristina Cruz Mínguez as Celia Gálvez de Montalbán
- Ana Duato as María del Pilar Gálvez de Montalbán (Mum)
- Pedro Díez del Corral as Pablo Gálvez (Dad)
- Adela Armengol as Julia Gálvez
- Sian Thomas as Miss Nelly
- Miguel Magaña as Juan Antonio 'Baby/Cuchifritín' Gálvez de Montalbán
- Concha Salinas as Juana
- Josep Cortés as Don Pedro
- Carmen Rossi as Doña Petra
- Concha Leza as Cook
- Aurora Redondo as Doña Benita
- Tito Valverde as Rodrigo Gálvez
- Diana Salcedo as Basílides
- Miguel Ángel García as Pronobis
- Tito Augusto as Lamparón
- María Isbert as Madre Superiora
- Paloma Paso Jardiel as Madre Loreto
- Montse Pérez López as Madre Bibiana
- Yelena Samarina as Madre Isolina
- Sílvia Munt as Madre Corazón
- Paula Soldevila as Sister
- Nathalie Seseña as Sister
- Silvia Casanova as Sister
- Rafael Díaz as Juanón
- Ángel de Andrés as Don Restituto
- Luz María Gómez as Rafaela
- Mario Maranzana as Ringmaster

== Plot ==
Celia is a seven-year-old girl living with her family in her home located in a street, la Calle Serrano, in Madrid, Spain. Celia has a way of questioning everything around her, in a way of immature innocence, as well as ingenuity; she wonders about the identity of the Three Wise Men, for instance, and the strange ideas and thoughts that people tend to say. Celia's mother and father have little time to spend with their daughter; she is away visiting friends or out shopping and often comes home very late at night, leaving Celia in the care of Miss Nelly, the English governess, while he is busy attending to his work in his office. Celia is not allowed to play much with her little brother "Baby", whom she names "Cuchifritín", because he is too small and fragile, but spends time with other playmates such as Solita, the porter's daughter and María Teresa. While under the care of Miss Nelly, whom Celia cannot stand, or Juana, the maid, Celia often finds ways to get into all sorts of scrapes, though mostly unintentionally. Eventually, feeling insulted and humiliated, Miss Nelly returns to England, and Celia's mother calls upon a woman, Doña Benita, to look after the girl. It turns out however, that Doña Benita's imagination is as wild and innocent as Celia's and the two become very close. Celia is enthralled by Doña Benita's fantastic stories about fairies and demons, and all sorts of odd beliefs and superstitions. Following an eventful summer at the beach and the Spanish countryside, Celia's mother, with some help from her sister-in-law Julia, convinces her husband to have the girl sent off to a convent, where they hope she'll learn discipline and good behaviour. Once at the school with the nuns, Celia continues to make mischief and form many chaotic events at the convent, often with the help of other girls.

== Characters ==
=== Gálvez Family ===
- Celia Gálvez de Montalbán (played by Cristina Cruz Mínguez): The protagonist, Celia is a seven-year-old girl with a wild imagination. She has an ingenious way of questioning the things adults say and do, expresses her mind freely and lives in a fairy tale world of her own. Celia often gets into scrapes, some mild and some more serious, but seldom with bad intentions.
- Pablo Gálvez (played by Pedro Díez del Corral): Celia's father, he works hard to support his family. At one point he comes to realize that he is tired of who he is and the work he does. He loves Celia dearly and is very unhappy when he must send her away with the nuns. Wanting to improve their family's situation, he and his wife leave for another country hoping to find work.
- María del Pilar de Montalbán (played by Ana Duato): Celia's mother, she loves her husband and children dearly, but spends much time outside their home. She is a very social woman and frequently goes out shopping and to have tea with her friends. When Celia passes from being a handful to being a threat to her little brother's safety, María has no option but to take her sister-in-law Julia's advice and send her daughter with the nuns.
- Juan Antonio "Baby/Cuchifritín" Gálvez (played by Miguel Magaña): Celia's baby brother, he is named "Cuchifritín" by Doña Benita; Celia likes the name and uses it from that day on. Cuchifritín is often Celia's only playmate, and her sometimes rough play doesn't particularly please him. Celia accidentally makes Cuchifritín very ill on one occasion, which is when Celia's parents decide to send her away.
- Tía Julia (played by Adela Armengol): Tía Julia is Celia's aunt and Pablo's sister. She often tries to convince her brother and sister-in-law that the best way to deal with Celia would be to send her to a convent. When she sees that Doña Benita does not help the situation, she tries her suggestion once again and is finally successful at convincing Pablo.

=== Household staff ===
- Doña Benita (played by Aurora Redondo): Doña Benita is an elderly woman who arrives in Madrid in answer to a request made by Celia's mother. She is asked to replace Miss Nelly and look after the girl, but it turns out that Doña Benita's imagination is as wild as Celia's. Doña Benita joins Celia in many of her escapes and always defends her.
- Miss Nelly (played by Sian Thomas): She is Celia's English governess and has come to Spain to look after Celia and teach her the English language. She is unsuccessful, however, though she manages to teach the girl some English. Feeling insulted and humiliated, one day Miss Nelly resigns and announces that she returns to England. She is then replaced by Doña Benita.
- Juana (played by Concha Salinas): Juana is the household maid. She has a short temper and little patience with the girl and agrees that she needs to be disciplined. She often says that if she had her way, she'd whack Celia until she learned to behave like she should. Though she often quarrels with the girl, she, too loves her and worries whenever she is outside the home and can't be found.
- Doña Petra (played by Carmen Rossi): A kind servant, Doña Petra is in charge of the sewing at home. She helps Celia prepare her costume for Carnival and is always good to the girl.
- The Cook (played by Concha Leza): Just like Doña Petra, the cook is also very kind to Celia. When she and Doña Benita arrive home with Picarín, the donkey, she prepares worm milk for it to drink. Like most of the less educated people, the cook is highly superstitious.

== Broadcast ==
Celia was first broadcast on La Primera between 5 January and 9 February 1993. It remains a popular series and has been aired on TVE numerous times.

== Home video ==
In 1993, Spanish distributor Editorial América Ibérica released the series for the first time on VHS. The six different episodes were sold individually in a colorful collection entitled "El mundo de Celia" ("The World of Celia"), and each was packed together with a reprint of Elena Fortún's first six "Celia" novels: Celia, lo que dice (1929) was included with the first episode of the series, "Soy Celia", Celia en el colegio (1932) with the second, "Doña Benita", Celia novelista (1934) with "El verano", Celia en el mundo (1934) with "En el colegio", Celia y sus amigos (1935) with "Ni santa, ni mártir" and Celia madrecita (1939) with "¡Hasta la vista!". Editorial América Ibérica did not produce reprints of the remaining Celia novels. These VHS and book sets were sold primarily at kioscos and local bookstores as opposed to large video stores.

In 2001, distributor Divisa Home Video released the series on VHS and Region 2 DVD as part of their extensive "Series clásicas" ("Classic series") collection that offered a wide variety of classic Spanish television series, mostly for older audiences. All six episodes were released together in one single set of three cassettes or discs. The latter has two audio options, Spanish Dolby Digital 5.1 or 2.0 Stereo; subtitles in English, German, French, Italian and Portuguese; and extra features including a 1992 featurette, "Buscando a Celia" ("Looking for Celia"). A 2-disc re-release of the pack (three episodes per disc) also featured the "Celia: La premiere" documentary not included in the first release. Divisa also released this collection, with identical specifications, except for 1080p video, as a Digipak Blu-ray in 2012, which was reissued in a keep case in 2020.

== Reception ==
In 1993, Celia was awarded the TP de Oro for Best Dramatic National Series in Spain. The TP de Oro is considered one of the most prestigious, if not the most prestigious, awards given to television programs and actors in the country.

== Episodes ==
No.	Title	Original release date
1	"Soy Celia" "I am Celia"	5 January 1993
Celia's story begins on the night of 5 January 1932. After being put to bed by Miss Nelly, Celia is visited by Balthazar, one of the Three Wise Men. On his balcony, Balthazar places presents for Celia and asks her to share them with Solita, the poor caretaker's daughter. The next day, Celia wakes up to find her presents on the balcony again, which assures her that the visit was not a dream. Celia complies and sets out to share her new toys with Solita, but her father arrives and asks her to leave the balcony. Her father, who knows that his daughter is acting in good faith, allows Solita to keep the toys, with the exception of a teddy bear. During the day, Celia is in the care of Miss Nelly, a strict English governess. Together they go to the park and visit a fair in the village. Until the day Celia humiliates her so much that the governess decides to return to her homeland. Celia, for her part, is convinced that her mother is a real fairy from fairy tales, and that her father is afraid every time his wife leaves the house late at night. Celia has a little brother whom she loves very much, but as he is very small she is hardly allowed to go near him. One day she hears him crying and decides to take it upon herself to bathe him and put him in clean clothes. However, Celia's good deed ends in disaster when Juana and the cook discover that the child is not in the cot. Celia's mother, very angry to find Celia and her little brother soaking wet in the bath, decides to go to Doña Benita. The old woman, who comes from a good family, had looked after her and her siblings when they were young and now she is expected to educate Celia. Translated with www.DeepL.com/Translator (free version)
2	"Doña Benita" "Mrs. Benita"	13 January 1993
Answering to María's request, Doña Benita arrives in Madrid. Unfortunately, her presence turns out chaotic rather than a relief for Celia's parents. The woman is of good family and has a noble heart, but at the same time, she has an imagination as wild as Celia's. She tells the child many odd and strange stories about woodcutters who lost their way upon gazing at the Moon, or the real purpose of the Sun and the stars. She is also a very superstitious woman, and at the same time very religious, often relying on prayer during complicated times. Shortly after Doña Benita arrives, so does Celia's uncle, Tío Rodrigo, who comes to Madrid accompanied by his African servant, Maimón. Doña Benita takes an immediate dislike towards the Moor boy and this creates a short series of complications. At home, no one seems to be happy with who they are, especially Celia and her father. Celia wishes she could be someone else for a change, while her father finds his profession and character growing tiresome. Celia finds an opportunity to be someone else when she learns of old Doña Cándida, who rests ill in bed. Celia dresses up as a fairy with the purpose of presenting the old woman with treats and some money. One day, upon returning home from the park, Celia and Doña Benita save a small donkey from being sacrificed by purchasing it from its two young owners in exchange of two Spanish duros; Juana, the maid, believes their home is turning into a madhouse. The cook on the other hand, helps nurse the young donkey, but it soon starts kicking and running about creating a disaster in Celia's home. As summer begins to approach, Celia's mother has her daughter's hair cut, so she can avoid being uncomfortable due to the rising temperatures. Celia sees this as an opportunity to "prepare" her friends for summer and soon sets about cutting her cat Pirracas' and "Miss Nelly", the teddy bear's fur. Shortly afterwards, Celia is invited to her uncle's birthday party, but has an unpleasant time in the company of her two snobby girl-cousins and Basílides, her uncle's servant woman. The party ends in disaster when Maimón, the Moor boy accidentally shatters a valuable Chinese vase. Celia takes the blame, but Maimón confesses. Rodrigo rewards Celia's nobility by presenting her with the most valuable present he had in store for the girls, an elegant blue necklace.
3	"El verano" "The Summer"	19 January 1993
Summer arrives and Celia and her family spend its first days at the beach. Celia's mother has a hard time with Celia when the girl refuses to bathe in the sea. After a chaotic event with a bañista, a person whose job it is to help people bathe, Celia's father takes her out one day with the purpose of telling her daughter that he and her mother are leaving to Paris for a few days. Celia wants to join them but she is left behind in their mountain cottage with Doña Benita, and a new friend her age, Carlotica. The two girls share many adventures together. After listening to Doña Benita's mystical tales of fairies and fantasy, the two girls find a small German boy whom they believe to be a goblin. The girls spend rainy days at Carlotica's house with her grandfathergrand. Though he invites Celia so that the two girls can amuse him and have fun, he always ends up falling asleep. The two girls find entertainment in trying on the grandfather's old acting garments, something that greatly upsets the former actor. With the return of fair weather, Celia's parents return from their trip as well. When reunited, the family spends quiet time outdoors, until Celia hears a conversation her parents are having about their current financial troubles. Dressing herself as a servant girl in old rags, Celia sets off to work and earn some money from nearby villagers. A married peasant woman named Rafaela hires Celia and agrees to pay her three Spanish pesetas for her services. Celia helps the woman look after her child but there are some tasks, such as peeling potatoes, that she does not know how to do. Instead, Rafaela sends Celia up the hills where she asks her to find and bring a stubborn goat back to her. While she is out doing this, Celia is found by a group of guards that her parents had sent to find her. Celia is returned home and is received by looks of disappointment from her family; aunt Julia's old suggestion of sending Celia to a convent is considered once again by Celia's parents. Celia's last chance is ruined when, carelessly playing with her baby brother "Cuchifritín", manages to make the small boy dangerously ill. With a heavy heart, Celia's father tells Celia that he has no option but to send her with the nuns.
4	"En el colegio" "At the School"	26 January 1993
When summer ends, Celia is taken to a convent where her parents hope she'll learn good behavior. The school is not what Celia had anticipated; she has trouble adapting to the many strict rules of the nuns, and the more fun things, such as recess, are far too short. Celia is aware that her father misses her, and is willing to do anything in order to be sent home. Her first idea is to pretend to suffer a sleepwalking condition but is unsuccessful. At the same time, she discovers that the convent is a fun place and that though her father misses her, he really wishes for her to remain there. Celia has trouble getting along with the other girls at the school, she prefers playing outside with Lamparón and Pronovis, the altar boys, and their band of homeless orphaned children. Celia is often punished for her misbehavior by the nuns. On one occasion, while standing on her knees by the door, Celia lies to a man waiting to see the Mother Superior, telling him that the nuns and school workers suffer from smallpox. The man gives the alarm and informs the parents of the children about the disease that the nuns are supposedly keeping secret. Celia answers rudely when a mother questions her reason for being punished, the woman responds to her rudeness by exclaiming that "the world is ending." Many concerned parents take their children home, and that night in the dining room, Celia informs another girl that the reason for the absence of so many of the girls is not due to a revolution, but because the world is coming to an end. The shocking truth spreads across the school creating great alarm. The nuns gather the girls and send them to the chapel for prayer. The arrival of Don Restituto, the priest, clears the misunderstanding, and Celia is again punished. Eventually, Celia discovers that taking the blame for others' actions is a good way to make friends; the theory works at first, but when Celia blames herself for a murder and setting the nearby woods on fire she is taken to Don Restituto for a slight hearing. Celia tells the priest that she wishes to become a saint and Don Restituto applauds her decision and presents her with a book on the subject of girls who became saints. Her father arrives to visit her, and Celia learns that becoming a saint may require many sacrifices.
5	"Ni santa, ni mártir" "Neither Saint, nor Martyr"	2 February 1993
Celia continues wanting to become a saint; she visits Don Restituto daily to confess her sins, even when she has nothing to confess. Though she knows saints must be well-behaved, Celia continues to create mischief. She gives three of the four kittens she had previously rescued from being sacrificed with three friends; a fourth friend feels jealous at not receiving a kitten for herself. The girls hide their kittens in their desks during class, and setting them free one at a time, they disrupt the Madre Superior's lecture. The girl who had not received a kitten confesses that they all belong to Celia. Don Restituto, not wanting to be responsible for Celia's behavior, forbids the girl from becoming a saint. In Madre Bibiana's class, the nun worries that Celia will not finish her work in time to be present it on examination day. While the girls work during a thunderstorm, Madre Isolina rescues an injured stork from the rain and brings it inside. Wanting to pet it, Celia is bit by the stork, unable to continue sewing. She later adopts the stork and names it Culiculá. One of Celia's friends, also unable to become a saint, has a better idea; the two girls can escape to Africa, worship God angering the Moors and being beheaded, thus becoming martyrs. The girls plan their escape, but it is cut short when they are found by Juanón, the gardener, and returned to the school. Don Restituto tells the two girls that they are forbidden from being martyrs as well. The end of term is days away and Madre Corazón feels pressured to involve Celia in the end of the year play. The nuns prepare the girls by fixing their hair with curlers. Madre Loreto, in charge of preparing the girls for examination, struggles as she finds that the girls haven't learned as much as they were expected to. She proposes that the girls learn only what they will be asked during examination and hope to avoid ridicule. Parents arrive to see their daughters perform on the last day of school, but the day ends in disaster. Madre Loreto's plan fails and Celia feels the need to explain the situation to the Madre Superior. Celia, who expected to spend the summer with her family, learns from Doña Benita that her parents are leaving the country and that she will be left behind to spend the summer with the nuns. Celia feels betrayed and sad; during the play, she changes the words to her lines in order to explain how her parents are leaving and leaving her behind. Celia runs from the stage in tears and the festivity is brought to a dramatic end. Celia's parents, the nuns and Doña Benita run after Celia, who has hidden herself in the garden. Celia hears their calls, but has no intention of answering.
6	"¡Hasta la vista!" "Until We Meet Again!"	9 February 1993
Celia is the only girl remaining at the convent during summer, all the other girls are away with their families. Along comes Doña Merlucines, a seemingly good-natured woman, to spend the summer at the convent while her children are away in France; she and Celia get along very well at first and the girl is glad to finally have a companion. Doña Merlucines doesn't particularly like animals, however, and Celia does not like the way she treats Juanon's dog and Culiculá. After a small party Doña Remedios throws for her old friends, the woman invites Celia into the room to help herself to any of the treats that were left. Doña Remedios unconsciously helps Celia to a "chupito", a strong alcoholic beverage which makes the girl throw a fit of coughing. Madre Isolina arrives and the girl accuses Doña Remedios of giving her the drink. Thus begins the rivalry between the two characters. Celia watches a group of gypsies bringing their circus to town. Coralinda, a Chinese performer informs Celia that they're travelling to Beijing, China, and the girl decides that she is going with them; Juanón scorts her back to the convent. Doña Remedios arrives and is shocked when she sees Celia playing with cockroaches; the disgusted woman runs off screaming. Madre Bibiana is sent to the scene and Doña Remedios returns to find the cat Rabona destroying her needle-work. Angered, Doña Remedios tries to avenge the cat but it bites her instead; Doña Remedios tells the nuns that the cat is likely suffering from rabies. The nuns had laid Doña Remedios down to sleep when Celia enters the room with a container of cockroaches which she frees under Doña Remedios' sheets. The woman's shrieks of horror make the nuns believe that she has indeed contracted rabies and the woman is locked inside the room until the doctor arrives. Following the event, Celia's father pays one last visit to her daughter before leaving for Barcelona. As a present, Celia does not want chocolates, instead she wants to go see the circus performance in town. At the circus, Celia is happy to see Coralinda performing. When they return home, her father hands Celia a small writing book in which to write her own stories. The man is dismayed when Madre Loreto answers the door and the girl walks in without saying goodbye. Celia turns around, her face covered in tears and tells his father that she wants to be reunited with her family. She promises him to become an artist and travel to find them. Celia is escorted to the bedroom by Madre Loreto, and before going to sleep, she begins writing on her new book. She writes about escaping with the gypsies in search for her parents. In her imagination, she convinces Coralinda's father to take her along with them, and tells his daughter that she must find her parents.
