= Mario Martín Gijón =

Spanish writer, poet and literary critic (born 1979)

- Born: 1979 (age 46–47); Villanueva de la Serena, Spain
- Education: University of Extremadura
- Occupations: Writer, poet, literary critic
- Writing career
- Language: Spanish
- Genres: Poetry, short story, essay
- Notable works: Inconvenientes del turismo en Praga, Rendicción, La patria imaginada de Máximo José Kahn
- Notable awards: Gerardo Diego Prize for Literary Research (2009); Amado Alonso Prize for Literary Criticism (2011); Tigre Juan Award (2012); Arturo Barea Prize for Cultural Research (2013); Miguel de Unamuno Essay Prize (2017)

Mario Martín Gijón (born 1979 in Villanueva de la Serena, Spain) is a Spanish writer, poet and literary critic.

== Career ==
He holds a PhD in Spanish Philology and has taught at the Philipps University of Marburg (Germany) and the Masaryk University in Brno (Czech Republic). He currently teaches at the University of Extremadura (Spain).

He regularly contributes to literary reviews such as Clarín, Quimera and Cuadernos Hispanoamericanos, as well as writing a weekly column for El Periódico Extremadura.

In 2009 he received the Gerardo Diego Prize for Literary Research for his book José Herrera Petere en el surrealismo, la guerra y el destierro; in 2011, the Amado Alonso Prize for Literary Criticism for La patria imaginada de Máximo José Kahn. Vida y obra de un escritor de tres exilios; in 2012, the Tigre Juan Prize for Inconvenientes del turismo en Praga y otros cuentos europeos; in 2013, the Arturo Barea Prize for Cultural Research for La Resistencia franco-española (1936-1950). Una historia compartida; and in 2017, the Miguel de Unamuno Essay Prize for Un segundo destierro. La sombra de Unamuno en el exilio español.

As a poet he published Latidos y desplantes (2011), Rendicción (2013; English translation Sur(rendering), 2020), Tratado de entrañeza (2014) and Des en canto (2019).

His prose includes Inconvenientes del turismo en Praga y otros cuentos europeos (2012), Un día en la vida del inmortal Mathieu (2013), Un otoño extremeño (2017) and Ut pictura poesis y otros tres relatos (2018).

His work has been translated into English, French, Italian, German, Romanian, Czech and Chinese.

== Books ==
=== Poetry ===
- Latidos y desplantes, Madrid, Vitruvio, 2011.
- Rendicción, Madrid, Amargord, 2013 (translated into English by Terence Dooley: Sur(rendering). Bristol, Shearsman Books, 2020).
- Tratado de entrañeza, Madrid, Polibea, 2014.
- Des en canto, Valparaíso/Barcelona, RIL Editores, 2019.

=== Novels and short stories ===
- Inconvenientes del turismo en Praga, Mérida, Editora Regional de Extremadura, 2012.
- Inconvenientes del turismo en Praga y otros cuentos europeos, Oviedo, KRK, 2012.
- Un día en la vida del inmortal Mathieu, Madrid, Ediciones Irreverentes, 2013.
- Un otoño extremeño, Mérida, Editora Regional de Extremadura, 2017
- Ut pictura poesis y otros tres relatos, Valencia, Pre-Textos, 2018.

=== Essays and studies ===
- Una poesía de la presencia. José Herrera Petere en el surrealismo, la guerra y el exilio, Valencia, Pre-Textos, 2009.
- Entre el compromiso y la fantasía. La obra narrativa y dramática de José Herrera Petere, Sevilla, Renacimiento (Biblioteca del Exilio), 2010.
- Los (anti)intelectuales de la derecha en España. De Giménez Caballero a Jiménez Losantos, Barcelona, RBA Libros (Tema de Actualidad), 2011.
- La patria imaginada de Máximo José Kahn. Vida y obra de un escritor de tres exilios, Valencia, Pre-Textos, 2012.
- La Resistencia franco-española (1936-1950). Una historia compartida. Badajoz, Servicio de Publicaciones de la Diputación de Badajoz, 2014. Second edition: Dos Repúblicas contra el fascismo. Españoles y franceses desde la Guerra Civil a la Segunda Guerra Mundial, Granada, Comares, 2019.
- Voces de Extremadura. El camino de Paul Celan hacia su Shibboleth español, Madrid, Libros de la Resistencia, 2019.
