= Estoy por ti =

Spanish television dating show

Estoy por ti is a television dating show broadcast on Spain's Antena 3 channel from 11 July 2005 to 2006. It was presented by actress Anabel Alonso, and later by the Argentine Michel Brown.
