= Enriqueta Antolín =

Spanish journalist and writer (1941-2013)

- Born: Enriqueta Antolín Gimeno; 1941; Palencia, Spain
- Died: 26 November 2013 (aged 72); Madrid, Spain
- Occupations: Journalist, writer
- Spouse: Andrés Berlanga
- Awards: Tigre Juan Award (1992)

Enriqueta Antolín Gimeno (1941 – 26 November 2013) was a Spanish journalist and writer, best known for her novels.

== Biography ==
The descendant of a family deeply rooted in Palencia, Enriqueta Antolín moved to Toledo at age 6, where she lived a good part of her life. There she studied teaching, although later her vocation for journalism and literature prevailed.

Beginning in 1986 she contributed to the newspaper El País, and despite writing from her childhood, it was not until 1992 when she published her first novel, La gata con alas, which received the Tigre Juan Award for the year's best novel in Spanish. La gata con alas is a story of love and heartbreak set in postwar Spain that started a trilogy completed with Regiones devastadas (1995) and Mujer de aire (1997).

With these first three works, she earned recognition as one of the writers with the best insight into female psychology.

Her next work was Ayala sin olvidos (1998), a book of conversations with writer and academic Francisco Ayala, a mix of biography, interview, and novel. Then came two new novels: Caminar de noche (2001) and Cuentos con Rita (2003).

In 2005 she wrote the novel Final feliz, which she described thusly:

It's a triple story of love. It tells a story of the early 20th century interspersed with today through a voyage that I went on. The protagonist of the novel writes a diary that is "like all diaries", absolutely false.

Antolín wrote three young adult novels: Kris y el verano del piano (1997), Kris y su panda ¡en la selva! (1998), and Kris y los misterios de la vida (1999), based on the adventures of Kris, a character she created.

She collaborated with the artist Marisa Gonzalez, writing the text of her book Seréis como Dioses.

Considered a pertinacious nonconformist, Antolín's work often contains a mixture of reality and fiction with which the author pretends, as she put it, "to disconcert the reader." After spending an important part of her life in Toledo, she moved her residence to Madrid. She was married to the writer and journalist Andrés Berlanga.

A street is named for her in Palencia.

== Works ==
=== Novels ===
- La gata con alas, Alfaguara, 1992, ISBN 8420480886
- Regiones devastadas, Alfaguara, 1995, ISBN 8420481777
- Mujer de aire, Alfaguara, 1997, ISBN 8420482625
- Caminar de noche, Alfaguara, 2001, ISBN 8420442496
- Cuentos con Rita, Alfaguara, 2003, ISBN 8420400459
- Final feliz, Alfaguara, 2005, ISBN 8420468134
- Qué escribes, Pamela, Menoscuarto, 2012, ISBN 8496675858, finalist for the 2013 Castile and León Critics' Award

=== Young adult fiction ===
- Kris y el verano del piano, Alfaguay, 1997, ISBN 8420457558
- Kris y su panda ¡en la selva!, Alfaguay, 1998, ISBN 8420457760
- Kris y los misterios de la vida, Alfaguay, 1999, ISBN 8420457922

=== Essays ===
- "El territorio de las letras" in El territorio de las letras, Cátedra-Ministerio de Cultura, pp. 9–12, 1994, ISBN 8437612713
- Ayala sin olvidos, Alfaguara, 1998, ISBN 8420429929

=== Historical essays ===
- Musulmanas y judías en la España medieval: Vidas paralelas, M. Fundes, Cuenta y Razón, 1997
