= Marisol Ortiz de Zárate =

Spanish writer

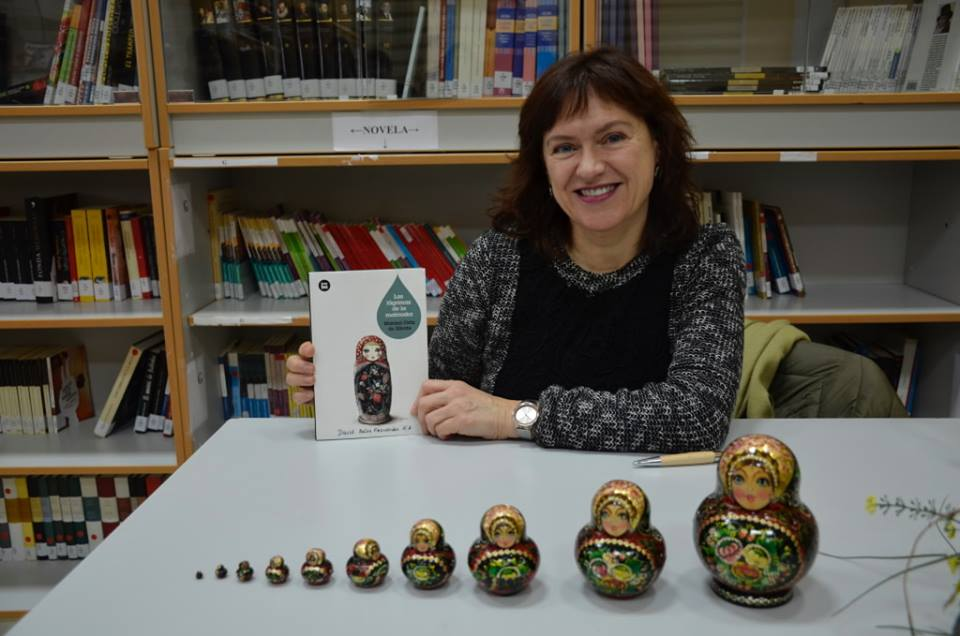
- Born: 1960 (age 64–65); Vitoria-Gasteiz, Spain
- Occupation: Writer
- Awards: Latino Book Award (2010); Felipe Trigo Award (2012)
- Website: marisolortizdezarate.wordpress.com

Marisol Ortiz de Zárate (born 1960) is a Spanish writer specializing in children's literature.

== Career ==
Marisol Ortiz de Zárate's first book was Los enigmas de Leonardo, a historical young adult novel. With its publication, she began to give talks at schools about reading and as a storyteller. She received her first award in the Antonia Cerrato Short Story and Poetry Contest organized by the Association of Friends of Santa Amalia (Badajoz), with a story entitled "Los curas llevan pantalones bajo la sotana". The novel La canción de Shao Li, which won a 2010 Latino Book Award, made her well-known as a writer specializing in children's literature. This adventure book, as well as the rest of her novels, are recommended reading in many Institutos de Educación Secundaria (IES). In 2014 she published her first novel for adults, Una historia Perdida, which won the Felipe Trigo Novel Award.

Ortiz is a founding member of Krelia.a, the Association of Literary Creators of Álava, in Vitoria-Gasteiz, where she lives. She divides her time between writing and teaching at the City Council's creative writing workshops.

== Works ==
=== Novels ===
- Los enigmas de Leonardo, Bruño, 2002, ISBN 9788421691014
- La cruz bajo la lengua, Arte-Activo, 2007, ISBN 9788493552015
- La canción de Shao Li, Bambú, 2009, ISBN 9788483431894
- Cantan los gallos, Bambú, 2011, ISBN 9788483431290
- Una historia perdida, Algaida, 2014, ISBN 9788498779660
- Rebelión en Verne, Bambú, 2015, ISBN 9788483433713
- Las lágrimas de la matrioska, Bambú, 2015, ISBN 9788483432914, illustrations by Marina Suárez Ortiz de Zárate
- La fabuladora, Bambú, 2018, ISBN 9788483435496

=== Short stories ===
- "Los curas llevan pantalones bajo la sotana" (published in Papeles de Zabalanda, 2009)
- "Un día cualquiera"
- "Cuesta arriba" (published in El amor, los espejos, el tiempo, el camino, A-A Ediciones, 2012)
- "Refugio de piedra"
- "Descubriendo Berlín" (published in El Correo, section Territorios)
- "La noche más larga" (published in El Correo, section Territorios)
- "El confidente precioso" (published in El Correo, section Territorios)
- "El niño pez" (published in El Correo, section Territorios)
- "Por las montañas heladas" (published in Inquietos Vascones, Desnivel, 2013)
- "Campo fronterizo" (published in Un refugio, treinta escritores ante un campamento de refugiados de guerra, Fundación de Estudios Jurídicos y Sociales, 2014)
- "Pasaje a la vida" (published in Un país Extranjero, Agapein, 2016)
- "Calzada de colores" (published in El Correo)

== Awards ==
- Antonia Cerrato Award, 2006
- Víctor Chamorro Award, 2006
- Encuentro de dos Mundos Award, 2009, Ferney-Voltaire (France)
- Latino Book Award for best young adult fiction, 2010, New York, for La canción de Shao Li
- Finalist at the Hache Awards, Cartagena, for La canción de Shao Li, 2010
- 32nd Felipe Trigo Literary Award in the Novel category for Una historia perdida, 2012
- Finalist for the 2012 Euskadi Award for children's narrative for Cantan los gallos
- María Giralt Award, 2014
