= Raúl Argemí =

Argentinean writer

Raúl Argemí (1946–present) is an Argentinean writer, resident of Buenos Aires, after 12 years living in Barcelona, Catalonia, Spain. He is a crime writer. His work has garnered diverse awards in Spain, amongst them the Dashiell Hammett award, and it has been translated into French, Italian, Dutch, German and Greek.

== Biography ==
Born in La Plata, capital of the Buenos Aires province, Argentina, Raúl Argemí had begun working early in his life in the scenic arts as an author and theatre director. In the beginning of the 1970s he was involved in the armed struggles of Argentina, joining the ranks of ERP-22 de Agosto (For further information about ERP, see People's Revolutionary Army (Argentina)). He lived underground until he was arrested in 1974. He spent the entire Argentinian military dictatorship (named by its leaders National Reorganization Process) rule incarcerated, and after the end of military rule and the return of democratic government, he was freed in 1984. At this time he started his journalistic work, an activity in which he is still occupied. During his stay in the city of Buenos Aires he held the position of Chief of Culture, and Director of Claves magazine, and he also collaborated in the Southern Cone edition of Le monde diplomatique. In 1986 he moved to the Patagonia region of Argentina, where he worked in the regional press. The landscape's strong character in this southerly region of the world entranced him: the majority of his novels have the Patagonia as a backdrop.

In 2000 he moved to Spain, country in which his career in the written arts made a significant jump, and his novels started to be published frequently, many of which had been the result of long years of work during his life in Patagonia. Hand in hand with his books, the awards started arriving, as well as the translations for other European markets. In 2013 he moved to Buenos Aires, Argentina, where he works at magazine Miradas al Sur.

== Works ==
- El gordo, el francés y el ratón Pérez. Buenos Aires, 1996. Catálogos.

- Translated to French: Le gros, le français et la souris. 2005. Rivages/Noir.

- Los muertos siempre pierden los zapatos. Sevilla, 2002. Algaida.

XXI Felipe Trigo Novel Award

- Translated to French: Les morts perdent toujours leurs chaussures. 2007. Rivages/Noir.

- Negra y Criminal. Barcelona, 2003. Zoela. Novel written between 12 different authors: Andreu Martín, Alicia Giménez Bartlett, Francisco González Ledesma, Jaume Ribera, amongst others.
- Penúltimo nombre de guerra. Sevilla, 2004. Algaida.

Dashiell Hammett 2005 Award, XIII Luis Berenguer International Novel Award, 2005 Brigada 21 Award to the best original novel in Spanish, Novelpol 2005 Award, Hammett 2005 Award.

- Translated to Italian: Penúltimo nome di battaglia. Editorial Nuova Frontiera, 2006.

- Translated to Dutch: Alias. Editorial De Boeekenplank, 2007.

- Translated to German: Chamäleon Cacho. Unionsverlag, 2008.

- Patagonia Chu Chu. Sevilla, 2005. Algaida.

VII Francisco García Pavón Narrative Award

- Translated to Italian: Patagonia ciuf ciuf. Editorial Nuova Frontiera, 2007.

- Siempre la misma música. Sevilla, 2006. Algaida.

XXVIII Tigre Juan Award, 2005

- Retrato de familia con muerta. Barcelona, 2008. Roca.

L'H Confidencial Award, 2008

- La última caravana. Barcelona, 2008. Edebé.

- Translated to Italian: L´ultima carovana della Patagonia. Editorial Nuova Frontiera, 2010.

- (Various Authors) Matar en Barcelona (antología de relatos). Barcelona, 2009. Alpha Decay.
- El ángel de Ringo Bonavena- (Novela) EDEBé, 2012
- A tumba abierta (Novela), Navona (España) 2015.
