= Elena Fortún =

Spanish author (1886–1952)

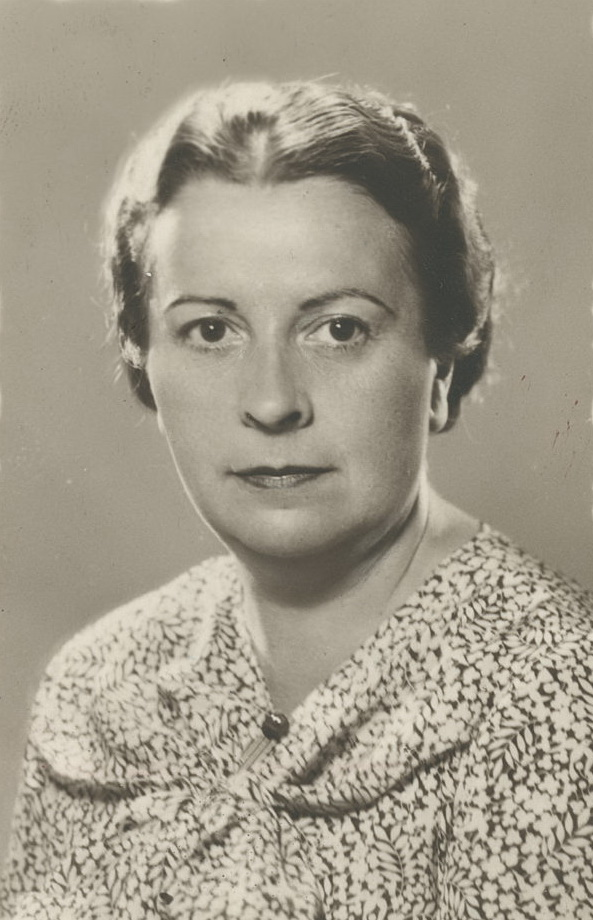
- Elena Fortún in 1935
- Born: María de la Encarnación Gertrudis Jacoba Aragoneses y de Urquijo; 18 November 1886; Madrid, Spain
- Died: 8 May 1952 (aged 65); Madrid, Spain

María de la Encarnación Gertrudis Jacoba Aragoneses y de Urquijo (18 November 1886 in Madrid – 8 May 1952 in Madrid) was a Spanish author of children's literature who wrote under the pen name Elena Fortún. She became famous for Celia, lo que dice ("What Celia Says") the first in the series of children's novels which were a collection of short stories first published in magazines in 1929. The series were both popular and successful during the time of their publications and are today considered classics of Spanish literature.

== Life ==
She was the daughter of Leocadio Aragoneses, a yeoman of the Spanish Royal Guard from Segovia and her mother was Basque. Born in Madrid she spent her summers with her grandfather, Isidro, in Abades, a small village west of Segovia. She studied Philosophy in Madrid. In 1908 she married her cousin, Eusebio de Gorbea y Lemmi, a military man, intellectual and writer. They had two sons, the youngest, Bolín, died in 1920 at the age of 10 and she sank into a deep depression, at times trying to contact him through a Ouija board. Her younger son, who had lost an eye in a hunting accident, eventually married Ana María Link, a young Swiss student who was studying at the Residencia de Señoritas in Madrid. Encarna lived mainly in Madrid but also spent time in Tenerife in the Canary Islands, San Roque, Zaragoza, Barcelona, Valencia, France and Argentina.

Her husband, Gorbea, a playwright, was a member of the Generation of 1914 and introduced Encarnación to his circle of writers and artists. By the late 1920s she had decided to write and began writing for children in 1928 for the magazine Blanco y Negro under the pseudonym Elena Fortún, a name of one of her husband's characters. Her stories became so popular that the publishing house of Aguilar became interested and began putting them into print in 1935. Set in Madrid, these stories were told from the perspective of seven-year-old Celia Gálvez de Montalbán, a young girl who questions adults and the world around her in ways that were both ingenuous and innocent. She especially queried the educational system that sought to dampen the imaginations of young girls. Encarna knew how to excite the hearts, minds and dreams of children and these stories became favorites with Spanish girls during the 1930s through the 1960s.

== Spanish Civil War ==
Although a member of the Lyceum Women's Club, Encarna Aragoneses was not engaged in any political activity, however she believed that the Second Spanish Republic would end illiteracy and bring equality into women's lives. At the start of the Spanish Civil War she stayed in Madrid with her husband who was loyal to the Republic. In Celia en la revolución (1987), an accurate portrayal of Republican Spain during the siege of Madrid, the author wonders who is right and expresses her own thoughts and sufferings of the war through Celia who is horrified at the uncompromising positions of both sides. In 1938 she became a member of the Comisión del Teatro de los Niños and in July her play Moñitos (Baubles) was staged.

== Exile ==
Later that year she and her husband went to Paris and then into exile in Argentina with help from her daughter-in-law's family. In Buenos Aires she met the writer Jorge Luis Borges at the National Public Library where they were both working. Unlike other writers who left Spain because of the war, her Celia books continued to be published despite the fact that Celia, like Encarna and her husband, was a Republican with no specific party affiliation.

In 1948 she returned to Spain to negotiate the possibility of an amnesty for her husband. She was not persecuted because she did not belong to a political party, her only crime was being a woman who felt that the Republic would enhance the education and role of women in society. She visited with her old friends from the "defunct" Lyceum Women's Club which was continuing its activities in an unofficial and clandestine way. A few months later her husband, who was still in Buenos Aires, committed suicide. Grief-stricken she went to America to live with her son who was in exile.

Later she returned to Madrid and died on 8 May 1952, aged 65.

== Legacy ==
In 1957, a few years after her death, María Martos de Baeza and playwright Matilde Ras sponsored a fund raising effort to erect a monument in her honor in the Parque del Oeste in Madrid. The relief which shows Elena Fortún between two children was designed by the Murcian sculptor José Planes. In Córdoba there are the beautiful Jardines Escritora Elena Fortún named in her honor; as well as the streets, Calle Elena Fortún in Madrid, Las Rozas de Madrid, Valdetorres de Jarama and, in Málaga, the Calle Escritora Elena Fortún. In 1990, Madrid opened the Elena Fortun Library in the center of the city.

In 1993 Celia, lo que dice, Celia novelista and Celia en el colegio were adapted into a series of six episodes for Spanish television and directed by José Luis Borau.

In November 2019, her book Celia en la revolución was adapted by Alba Quintas into a theater play, directed by María Folguera. It premiered at the Valle-Inclán Theater of the Spanish National Drama Center.

In 2022, a new unpublished work written by Fortún under a pseudonym was published. El pensionado de Santa Casilda has a lesbian theme, portraying a group of young people who go from adolescence to adulthood in a boarding school and romantic relationships between women.

== Writings ==
- Celia, lo que dice (1929)
- Celia en el colegio (1932)
- Celia novelista (1934)
- Celia en el mundo (1934)
- Celia y sus amigos (1935)
- Cuchifritín el hermano de Celia (1935)
- Cuchifritín y sus primos (1935)
- Cuchifritín en casa de su abuelo (1936)
- Cuchifritín y Paquito (1936)
- Las travesuras de Matonkiki (1936)
- Matonkiki y sus hermanas (1936)
- Celia madrecita (1939)
- Celia institutriz en América (1944)
- El cuaderno de Celia (1947)
- La hermana de Celia (1949)
- Mila, Piolín y el burro (1949)
- Celia se casa (cuenta Mila) (1950)
- Patita y Mila estudiantes (1951)
- La hermana de Celia: Mila y Piolín
- El arte de contar cuentos a los niños (1947)
- Los cuentos que Celia cuenta a las niñas (1950)
- Los cuentos que Celia cuenta a los niños (1951)
- Celia en la revolución (1987)
- Oculto Sendero (2016)
