= Chicken Skin (film) =

- Theatrical release poster
- Spanish: Carne de gallina
- Directed by: Javier Maqua
- Screenplay by: Maxi Rodríguez; Javier Maqua
- Produced by: Eduardo Campoy; J. Alberto Tellería
- Starring: Karra Elejalde; Anabel Alonso; Nathalie Seseña; Amparo Valle; Txema Blasco; Maxi Rodríguez
- Cinematography: Juan Carlos Gómez
- Edited by: Luisma del Valle
- Music by: Mario de Benito
- Production companies: Último Pase; Cartel
- Distributed by: Lauren Film
- Release dates: 30 November 2001 (FICX); 1 February 2002 (Spain)
- Country: Spain
- Language: Spanish

Chicken Skin (Spanish: Carne de gallina) is a 2001 Spanish black comedy film directed by Javier Maqua from a screenplay by Maqua and Maxi Rodríguez. Its cast features Karra Elejalde, Anabel Alonso, Nathalie Seseña, Amparo Valle, Txema Blasco, and Maxi Rodríguez.

== Plot ==
Set in a mining town in Asturias, the plot follows the family of a retired miner, Luisón Quirós. After Luisón dies in a brothel, the family members try to conceal the news and the corpse as they are economically dependent on the subsidies earned by Luisón.

== Cast ==
- Txema Blasco as Luisón
- Karra Elejalde as Gelín
- Isabel Ordaz as Carmen
- Anabel Alonso as Ágata
- Nathalie Seseña as Adelina
- Amparo Valle
- Maxi Rodríguez as Cefe

== Production ==
The film was produced by Último Pase and Cartel and it had the additional participation of TVE and Vía Digital. It boasted a €1.9 million budget. It was shot in Mieres, Asturias in 2000.

== Release ==
The film screened as the closing film of the 39th Gijón International Film Festival (FICX) in November 2001. Distributed by Lauren Film, it was released theatrically in Spain on 1 February 2002.

== Reception ==
Jonathan Holland of Variety deemed the "delightfully oddball, bad-taste comedy with a political point" to be "a surprise pleasure".

José Luis Sánchez Noriega considered that despite the film falling short of being exceptional, "Spanish film buffs will be pleased" by the film for how "it cultivates the literary, theatrical and filmic vein of black humor" along the lines of Berlanga or Buñuel.

== See also ==
- List of Spanish films of 2002
