= List of storms named Celia =

The name Celia has been used for three tropical cyclones in the Atlantic Ocean and for eight in the Eastern Pacific Ocean. It has also been used for one extratropical European windstorm.

In the Atlantic:

- Tropical Storm Celia (1962), did not affect land
- Hurricane Celia (1966), struck the Bahamas
- Hurricane Celia (1970), Category 4 hurricane that made landfall in western Pinar del Río Province, Cuba and at Corpus Christi, Texas; caused 28 deaths and $930 million (1970 USD) in damage

The name was retired in the Atlantic basin following the 1970 season.

In the Eastern Pacific:

- Hurricane Celia (1980), remained well offshore of Mexico
- Hurricane Celia (1986), remained well offshore of Mexico
- Hurricane Celia (1992), Category 4 storm that stayed well at sea
- Tropical Storm Celia (1998), stayed well off the coast of Mexico
- Hurricane Celia (2004), stayed out to sea
- Hurricane Celia (2010), Category 5 hurricane that remained offshore Mexico
- Hurricane Celia (2016), churned in the open ocean, dissipated well east of Hawaii
- Tropical Storm Celia (2022), formed off the coast of Central America and paralleled the southwestern coast of Mexico before moving out to sea

In Europe:

- Storm Celia (2022), impacted the Iberian Peninsula and Morocco; deposited an accumulation of Saharan dust in parts of Spain.
