= Pablo Tusset =

Spanish writer (born 1965)

Pablo Tusset (born 1965) is a Spanish writer.

Tusset was born in Barcelona. In 2001 he published The Best Thing That Can Happen to a Croissant (original title: Lo mejor que le puede pasar a un cruasán), which won the Tigre Juan Award.

In 2006 he published his second novel, En el nombre del cerdo (In the name of Pork), not yet translated in English. Tusset's third novel, Sakamura, Corrales y los muertos rientes (Sakamura, Corrales and the Smiling Dead), was released in 2009.
