= SS Celia =

A number of steamships have been named Celia, including:

- SS Celia (1883), a cargo ship in service 1883–91
- SS Celia (1906), a cargo ship in service 1906–21
- SS Celia (1943), a Hansa A Type cargo ship in service 1944–45
