= José Antonio Ramírez Lozano =

Spanish author

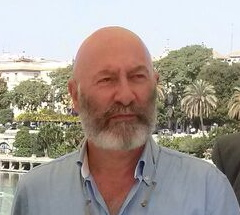
- José Antonio Ramírez Lozano in 2014
- Born: January 5, 1950 (age 76); Badajoz, Spain
- Occupations: Author, poet
- Writing career
- Language: Spanish
- Notable work: Gárgola (1984)
- Notable awards: Premio Azorín (1984), Premio de Novela Ciudad de Badajoz (2009)

José Antonio Ramírez Lozano (Badajoz, Spain, 5 January 1950) is a Spanish author. He won the Spanish Premio Azorín literary award for his 1984 novel Gárgola, and the Spanish Premio de literary award in 2009.
