= Felipe Trigo =

Spanish writer

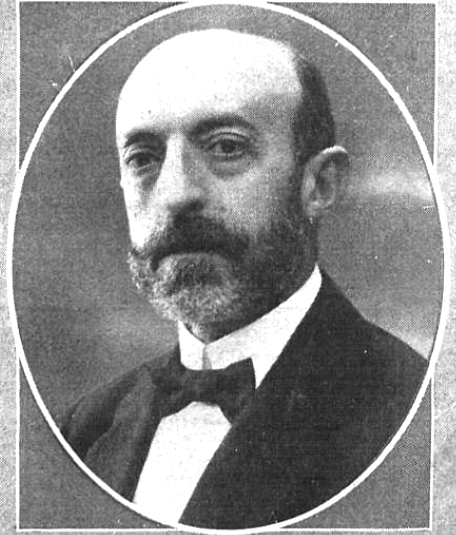
Felipe Trigo in 1912.

Felipe Trigo (13 February 1864 in Villanueva de la Serena, Badajoz – 2 September 1916 in Madrid) was a 20th-century Spanish writer.

He studied Medicine in Madrid and practised in several villages in Extremadura. He later become a member of Military Health Corps and he was appointed to Philippines, where he was about to die and he had to be repatriated as a Lieutenant-Colonel.

In 1900, he quit medicine to concentrate in literature. Eroticism was the main subject of his works, but he was also interested in social denounces and critics about illiteracy and caciquism with peasants in Spain and specially in the Extremadura of his times in particular.

Felipe Trigo committed suicide in 1916 for unclear reasons.

== Legacy ==
In 1981, the City Council of Villanueva de la Serena created the Felipe Trigo Awards in his honor to recognize the year's best novel and short narrative.

== Bibliography ==
- Las ingenuas (1901)
- La sed de amar (1903)
- Alma en los labios (1905)
- La Altísima (1907)
- La bruta (1908)
- Sor Demonio (1909)
- En la carrera (1909)
- Cuentos ingenuos (1909)
- Las posadas del amor (1909)
- Además del frac (1910)
- Así paga el diablo (1911)
- El papá de las bellezas (1913)
- A prueba
