= José Luis Borau =

Spanish producer, writer, and director

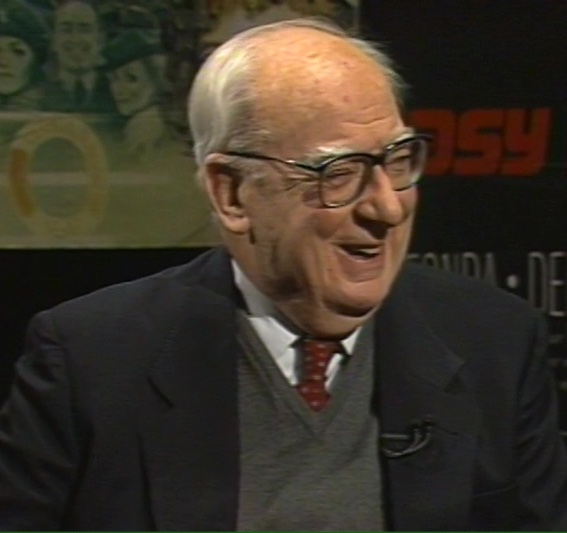
- Borau on CUNY TV's Cinema Then, Cinema Now (1992)
- Born: José Luis Borau Moradell; 8 August 1929; Zaragoza, Spain
- Died: 23 November 2012 (aged 83); Madrid, Spain
- Occupations: Film producer Film director Screenwriter
- Years active: 1960–2012

Seat B of the Real Academia Española
- In office 16 November 2008 – 23 November 2012
- Preceded by: Fernando Fernán Gómez
- Succeeded by: Aurora Egido

José Luis Borau Moradell (8 August 1929 – 23 November 2012) was a Spanish producer, screenwriter, writer, and film director. He won the Goya Award for Best Director in 2000 for Leo.

Borau was born in Zaragoza. In addition to directing, he acted in some films, including Everyone Off to Jail in 1993.

He was president of the Spanish Academy of Motion Picture Arts and Sciences (1994–1998), and member of the jury at the 41st Berlin International Film Festival in 1991. In February 2008 he was elected to the B seat of the Real Academia Española.

Borau died on 23 December 2012 aged 83 in Madrid from a throat cancer.

== Career ==
Borau was born in Zaragoza. During the Spanish Civil War he was kept from school by his overprotecting parents. From an early age, Borau had great love for literature and films. Following family pressure, he studied law in his native Zaragoza and worked at Madrid's Ministry of Housing in 1957. He began his career working for the regional newspaper Heraldo de Aragón as film critic. He pursued his interest in filmmaking by moving to Madrid enrolling in the national film school IIEC (Instituto de Investigaciones y Experiencias de Cinematografia) where he specialized in film direction. He graduated with the short film En el Río (1960).

Borau followed this with a series of shorts and commercials for Spanish television. His first feature film was a genre film: Brandy (1963), a low-budget Western starring Alex Nicol and Robert Hundar. Brandy was followed the next year by Crimen de doble filo Double edged crime (1964), a brooding psychological thriller. These two films were received as just two commercial projects. In 1966, Borau launched his television career for the Spanish network TVE working on episodes of Dichoso Mundo (What a World), which starred stage actress Conchita Montes.

From 1962 until 1970, Borau taught screenwriting at the national film school EOC. Some of his students became the next generation of notable Spanish filmmakers including Antonio Drove, Manuel Gutiérrez Aragón, Pilar Miró and Ivan Zulueta. While still teaching, Borau attempted to interest film producers in his scripts, but to no avail. As he did not like the films he was offered to direct either, he decided to create his own production company El Iman with capital he had made in advertisement for television. The first project that came out from El Iman was Un dos tres al escondite Inglés (Hide and Seek) (1969), a film directed by Ivan Zuleta. This project was followed by Jaime de Armiñán Mi querida señorita (My Dearest Senorita), with a script co-written by Borau. My Dearest Senorita, an unusual work in Spanish cinema, portrays the ignorance in some provincial areas of Spain through the tragic story of a man who was raised as a woman and doesn't know his true identity. The film was a critical and commercial success and it was nominated for an Oscar in the foreign language category.

In 1973, Borau scripted, produced and directed his third film, his first very personal project, Hay que matar a B (B must die) (1973). The film has an international cast, including Darren McGavin, Patricia Neal and Stéphane Audran. Set in a fictitious Latin American country, Hay q matar a B was a political thriller clearly inspired by Francoist Spain. In 1975 Borau made the film for which he is best remembered Furtivos (Poachers) (1975). The plot, set in the woodlands of Segovia, is a stark story of violence incest and matricide. Co-scripted with Gutierrez Aragon, Borau took the role of the regional governor in the film. He fought the Francoist censorship to have his film released the way he intended. Furtivos was a great commercial and critical success, it won best film, Golden Shell, at the San Sebastián International Film Festival becoming one of the key film of the political transition in Spain. His next project, was to produce and co script Camada Negra (Black litter) (1976) a film directed by Gutiérrez Aragón his writing partner in Furtivos.Camada Negra, a study of fascism's defining elements, like Furtivos became emblematic of Spanish films of that period.

In 1979 Borau undertook another international coproduction, La Sabina, a story of passion and superstition set in Andalusia with a cast of Spanish British and American actors including Jon Finch, Simon Ward, Ángela Molina and Carol Kane. That same year, Borau moved to Los Angeles in order to fulfill his longtime dream of making a film in Hollywood. Plagued by financial difficulties, he managed to complete Rio Abajo (On the line) (1983). The film, a drama centered on the Mexico US border that starred Victoria Abril and David Carradine, was blocked from competing in the Berlin film festival, where it had been presented as the Spanish entry, due to his unspanish look. On the line was generally well received in Spain, but failed to interest American distributors till 1988 and even then made a poor showing in the American market.

Borau's seventh film, Tata mía (1986), made in the style of Madrid comedies, centers on Elvira, a former nun unprepared to face a world so different from her religious or familiar past, her aging nanny is brought back to Madrid to help Elvira face the future. The film, an allegory of Spanish transition to democracy, had a stellar cast headed by Carmen Maura, Alfredo Landa and Imperio Argentina.

== Filmography ==
=== Director ===
Year	English title	Original title	Notes
1960	In the river	En el río	Documentary short
1963	Ride and Kill	Brandy	
1965	Double Edge Crime	Crimen de doble filo	
1974	B Must Die	Hay que matar a B	
1975	Poachers	Furtivos	Golden Shell at the San Sebastián International Film Festival.
1979	La Sabina	La Sabina	
1984	On the Line	Río abajo	
1986	Dear Nanny	Tata mía	
1992	Celia	Celia	Made for television.
1996	Niño nadie	Niño nadie	
2000	Leo	Leo	Goya Award Best director Entered into the 22nd Moscow International Film Festival.

=== Actor ===
Year	Title	Role	Notes
1965	El juego de la oca	Cliente del café	Uncredited
1970	Un, dos, tres... al escondite inglés	Tío Prudencio	Uncredited
1972	My Dearest Senorita	Médico	Uncredited
1975	Furtivos	Gobernador	
1975	La adúltera	Médico	
1978	Sonámbulos	Director de la biblioteca	
1981	Cuentos para una escapada		
1988	Malaventura	Alcántara	
1993	Todos a la cárcel	Capellan	
1996	Ilona llega con la lluvia	Alcántara	(final film role)

== Novels ==
- Camisa de once varas, 2003 Tigre Juan Award winner for narrative
- Navidad, horrible navidad
