= Hermandad Lírica =

19th-century Spanish poets group

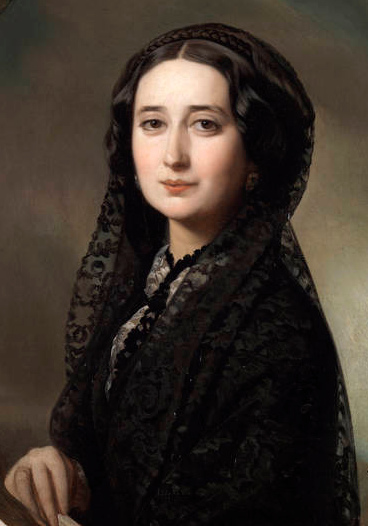
Carolina Coronado

The Hermandad Lírica (Lyrical Sisterhood) was the name given to a group of 19th century Spanish Romantic women poets who congregated and gave each other mutual support. Their salon examined literature and the issues facing Spain in the 19th century. Their first publications started around 1840. The driving force in the group was the poet Carolina Coronado. The body of their work was homoerotic; directed at other women, often other poets. After twenty years the group began to wane and their work fell out of favour among Spanish critics, due to an increasing masculinisation of the literary field and a rejection on the part of educated male society to the idea that women should or could produce literature.

In addition to Coronado, members of the group included Vicenta García Miranda, Teresa Verdejo y Durán, Amalia Fenollosa, Rogelia León, María del Pilar Sinués, Ángela Grassi, Manuela Cambronero, Dolores Cabrera y Heredia and Robustiana Armiño, among others.

== Background ==
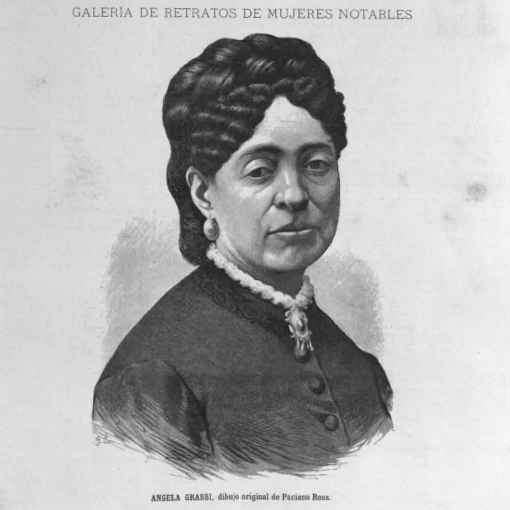
Ángela Grassi

Many of these self-taught women were born around the year 1820 and belonged to families of the well-to-do Spanish bourgeoisie. They shared similar poetic interests, literary influences, and in the publishing of work by women.

The Romantic movement empowered the women, even those with the most conservative ideology, to express themselves lyrically. However, women who dared to write and tried to be recognized as writers had to face cultural and historical adversities that relegated them to the background. The word poetess was used to describe them and ridicule them and their work. This was described by Rosario de Acuña in her poem Poetisa. The group gave the women a needed outlet from the inherent sexism of Spanish society and the restrictions it put upon them. Three of the members of the group pioneered methods to deal with their adversity: Josefa Massanés, Gertrudis Gómez de Avellaneda and Carolina Coronado. Between 1841 and 1843, first they published poetry magazines and, later, they published a poetry book.

They published specialized magazines for women. Several writers became directors of these magazines: Angela Grassi in El Correo de la Moda in Madrid and Faustina Sáez de Melgar in La Violeta. Most began to write in provincial towns or cities, although when they became professional writers they moved to Madrid or Barcelona.

== Themes ==
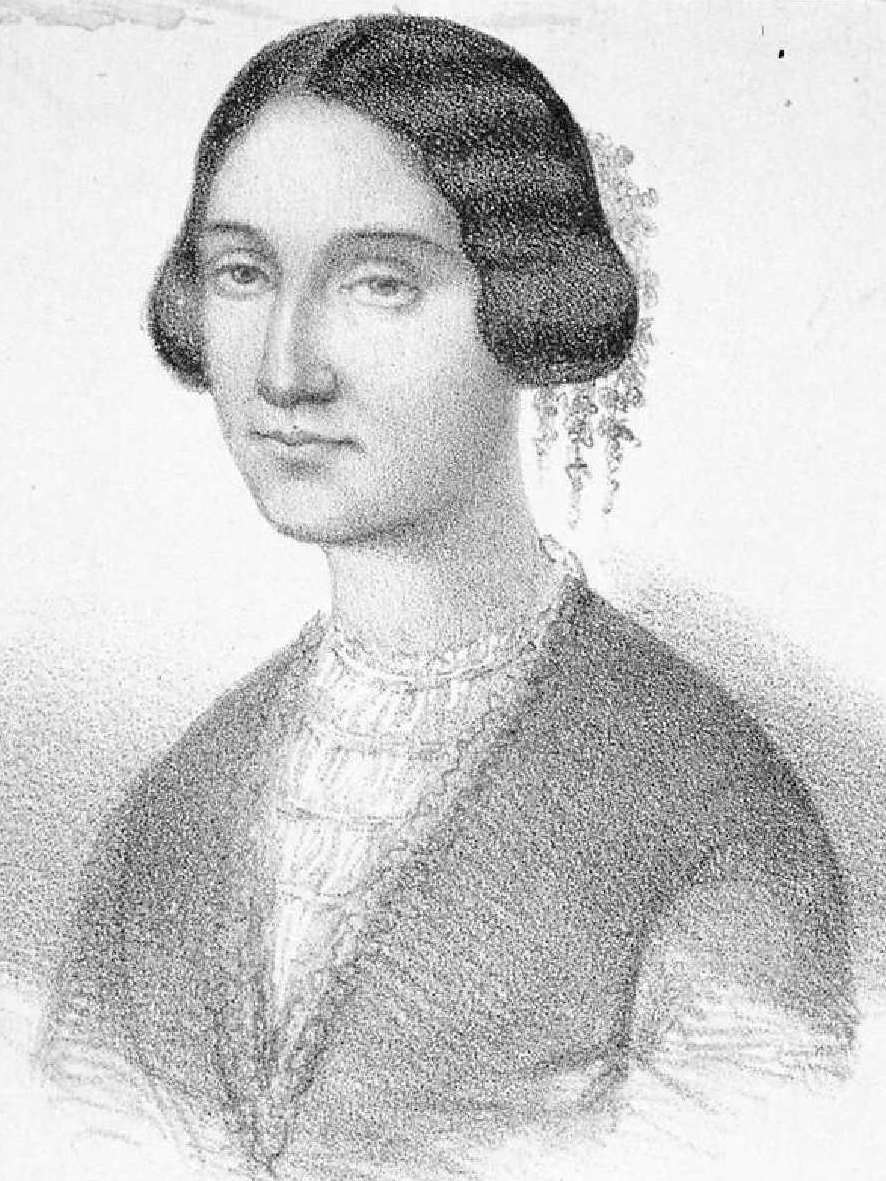
Dolores Cabrera y Heredia

Carolina Coronado wrote a series entitled Cantos de Safo where she tried to reimagine the memory of the ancient Greek poet Sappho and put into play her desire for freedom and female culture.

Two main themes were love and friendship, which materialize in poems of recognition in a cross between feelings and poetic rules. They borrowed the vocabulary and formulas of erotic poetry from their male colleagues, which helped them to express in their poems a spiritual sisterhood of mutual aid. Coronado was the center of this sisterhood, and she was the one who received the most literary dedications. Some of these poems are misleading because there is a lack of definition of the erotic object and the relationship between the lyrical voice and the recipient of the poem. A clear example is Dolores Cabrera and Heredia.

Another theme that abounds in their writing is the theme of the painful fate of women, which ranges from the melancholy of Fenollosa to the exhortation of García Miranda in her poem A las españolas, published in 1851.

The members of Hermandad Lírica also defended the value of the intelligence of women, reviled by their male colleagues. The poem by Cabrera and Heredia, El hastío, stands out. They were not demanding political rights, but women's access to print culture, intellectual activity and literary expression.

== Influence ==
The works of the Hermandad Lírica influenced later poetry. Their influence is seen in the works of Gustavo Adolfo Bécquer, whose poems recall Dolores Cabrera and Heredia in which the woman is beautiful but incapable of feeling love. They also influenced poems by Carolina Coronado and the poem by Cabrera and Heredia entitled Las golondrinas is a clear precedent for the Sevillian poet's Volverán las oscuras golondrinas.
