= Enriqueta Lozano =

Spanish writer and editor (1829–1895)

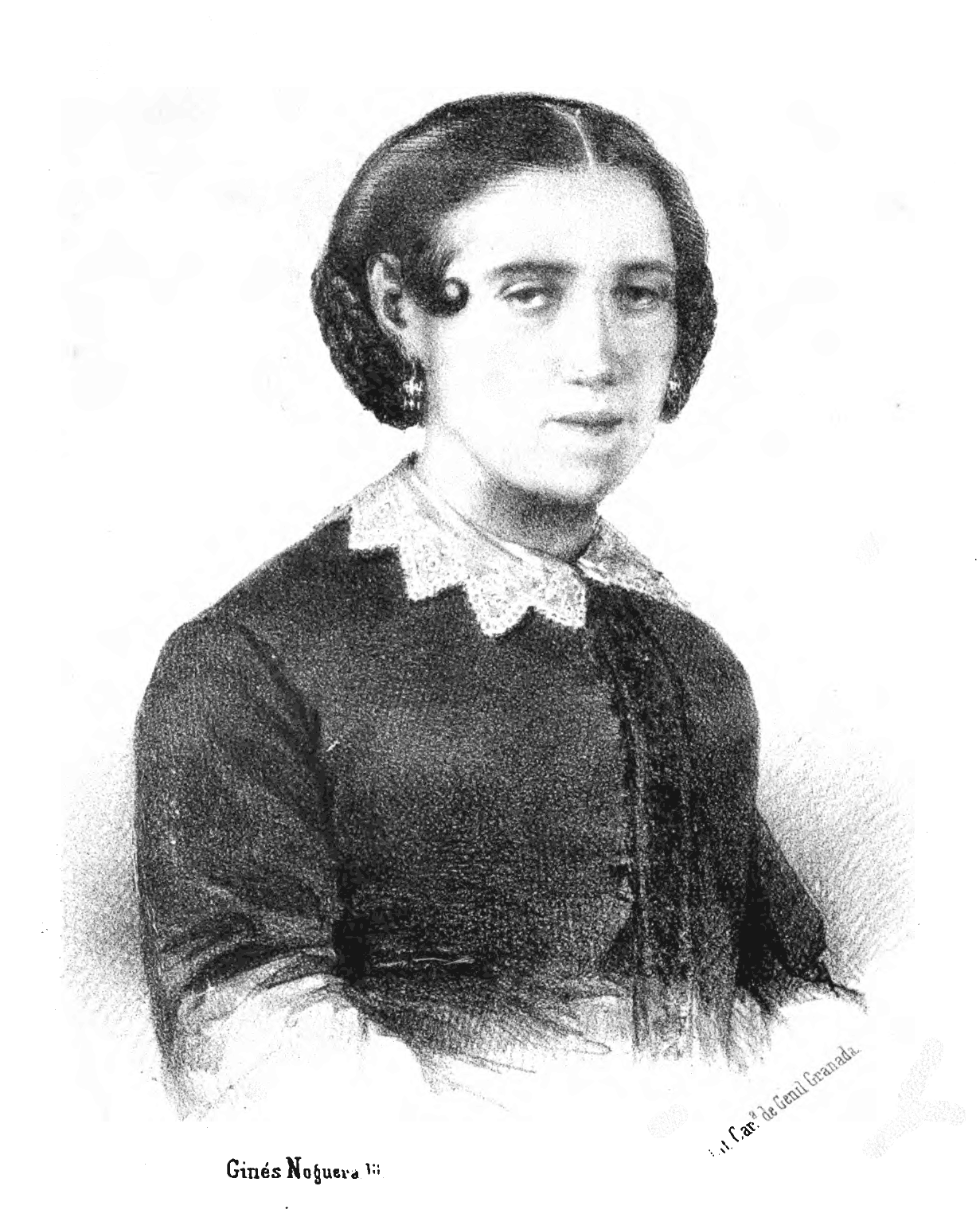
- Born: Enriqueta Lozano y Velázquez; 18 August 1829/30; Granada, Spain
- Died: 5 May 1895; Granada
- Education: Beguinage of Santo Domingo (Granada)
- Occupations: writer, novelist, poet, dramatic author, and publicist
- Spouse: Antonio Vílchez (m. 1859)
- Children: 12
- Writing career
- Pen name: Enriqueta Lozano; Enriqueta Lozano de Vilchez
- Literary movement: late Romanticism

Enriqueta Lozano y Velázquez de Vilchez (Granada, 18 August 1829/30 – Granada, 5 May 1895) was a Spanish writer, novelist, poet, dramatic author, and publicist of the late Romanticism period, with traditional features. Deeply religious, Lozano's writing stemmed from a conservative, traditional, moralizing, and sensibility point of view. Writing more than two hundred works, she published as "Enriqueta Lozano" before marriage and as "Enriqueta Lozano de Vilchez" afterward.

== Early life and education ==
Enriqueta Lozano y Velázquez was born on 18 August 1829 in Granada, Spain. She was the daughter of Infantry Lieutenant Francisco de Paula Lozano and María Rosario Velázquez. Enriqueta's mother died when the child was six years old, and after her father's remarriage, the stepmother when Enriqueta was eight. Her father was disabled by war wounds in 1836. At the age of seven, she entered the Beguinage of Santo Domingo in Granada, the center where the Empress Eugénie de Montijo was educated, where the child learned to read, write, and do domestic work. Until she was thirteen, she received classes from a private teacher who taught her Grammar, Geography, History, Arithmetic and Natural Sciences.

== Career ==
In 1846, she published her first poem entitled "In my mother's grave" in the newspaper El Capricho. The following year, 1847, she premiered, playing the leading role herself, and published the play Una actriz por amor (An Actress for Love). That same year, she was named Academic-Professor of Sciences and Literature, and member of merit of the "Liceo Artístico y Literario de Granada". She also became a member of the Sociedad Económica de los Amigos del País of the same city.

Known in her time as Granada's Sappho, she was a writer of extraordinary production. She wrote more than two hundred works, all with a religious and Catholic moral background, covering almost all literary genres: novels, stories, legends, moral studies, poetry, dramas and comedies, biographies of famous women, devotional books, lives of saints, essays, epistles, doctrinal and customs articles, and opera and zarzuela librettos. She is credited with the versification of the texts of the Moorish and Christian festivals of Válor and Benínar. Despite the ease she showed in the use of language, the scope of her literary work is limited. In poetry, se always used octosyllabic and hendecasyllabic verses. All of her dramatic works are written in verse and, despite the underlying theatrical instinct in all of them, they can seem artificial and closer to lyric than theater. The narrative, developed in environments typical of Romanticism, has characteristics of a serial novel, with a marked dualistic character, moralistic purposes, pronounced sentimentalism, and happy endings. She was a pro-Catholic author in contrast to the strong anticlericalism of her time.

She frequently collaborated in local, regional, and national periodical publications such as El Guadalbullón (Jaén), El Museo Literario (Seville), Ecos del Guadalevín (Ronda), El ángel del hogar (Madrid), Revista Compostelana (Santiago de Compostela), La Ilustración Artística (Barcelona), El Correo (Manila), and locally, Revista Literaria Granadina, El Defensor de Granada, El Eco de Occidente and especially in the magazines La Aurora de María (1868) and La Madre de Familia (1875-1895), founded, directed and financially supported by Lozano. Her complete works were published in Granada between 1865 and 1867, in three volumes that included a portrait and a biography written by María del Pilar Sinués.

She had the support and friendship of important personalities and institutions of local and national culture, such as Carolina Coronado, Fernán Caballero, the Liceo itself, the Ayuntamiento de Granada, and especially the Granada poet, José Salvador de Salvador.

== Personal life ==
She maintained a romantic relationship with Pedro Antonio de Alarcón, which end due to incompatibility between her religiosity and the then militant atheism of the Accitan author.

She married Antonio Vílchez in 1859, signing her works since then as "Enriqueta Lozano de Vílchez." She had twelve children, of whom only three survived her.

Enriqueta Lozano died of pulomonary tuberculosis at the age of 65, in a precarious economic situation.

== Awards and honours ==
She received numerous awards in literary competitions and games, among others: Granada City Council (1859 and 1863); Bibliographic-marine academy (1865); Gold pomegranate from the Lyceum (1880); Floral Games of Carcagente (1882); Malacitana Poetry Board (1886); Oratory Circle (Granada) (1886, 1887 and 1889); Floral Games of Gerona (1892); Zaragoza Floral Games (1894); Poetic contest to Santa Teresa (Ávila, 1894); Poetic contest, (Jaén, 1894).

== Selected works (Note: Extensive catalogs with the work of Enriqueta Lozano are included in Rodríguez Titos (2010: 115-126) and Simón Palmer (1991: 396-404). For this list, Ortega, José. Op. cit. p. 143 has been used, except when another source is indicated.) ==
=== Theatre ===
- Una actriz por amor (1847)
- Dios es el rey de reyes (1852)
- Don Juan de Austria (1854)
- La ruina del hogar (1873)
- El cáncer social (1876)

=== Poetry collections ===
- Poesías de la señorita doña Enriqueta Lozano (1848)
- La lira cristiana (1857)
- El ramo de violetas (1861)

=== Novels ===
- Juan, hermano de los pobres (1848)
- El secreto de una muerta (1860)
- Consuelo (1860)
- Juicio de Dios (1860)
- Lágrimas del corazón (1861)
- La misión de una madre (1865)
- La paloma de los cielos (1865)
- Un mar sin puerto (1883-1891)
- Emma Delaunay (1893)
