= Dolores Cabrera y Heredia =

Spanish Romantic poet and novelist

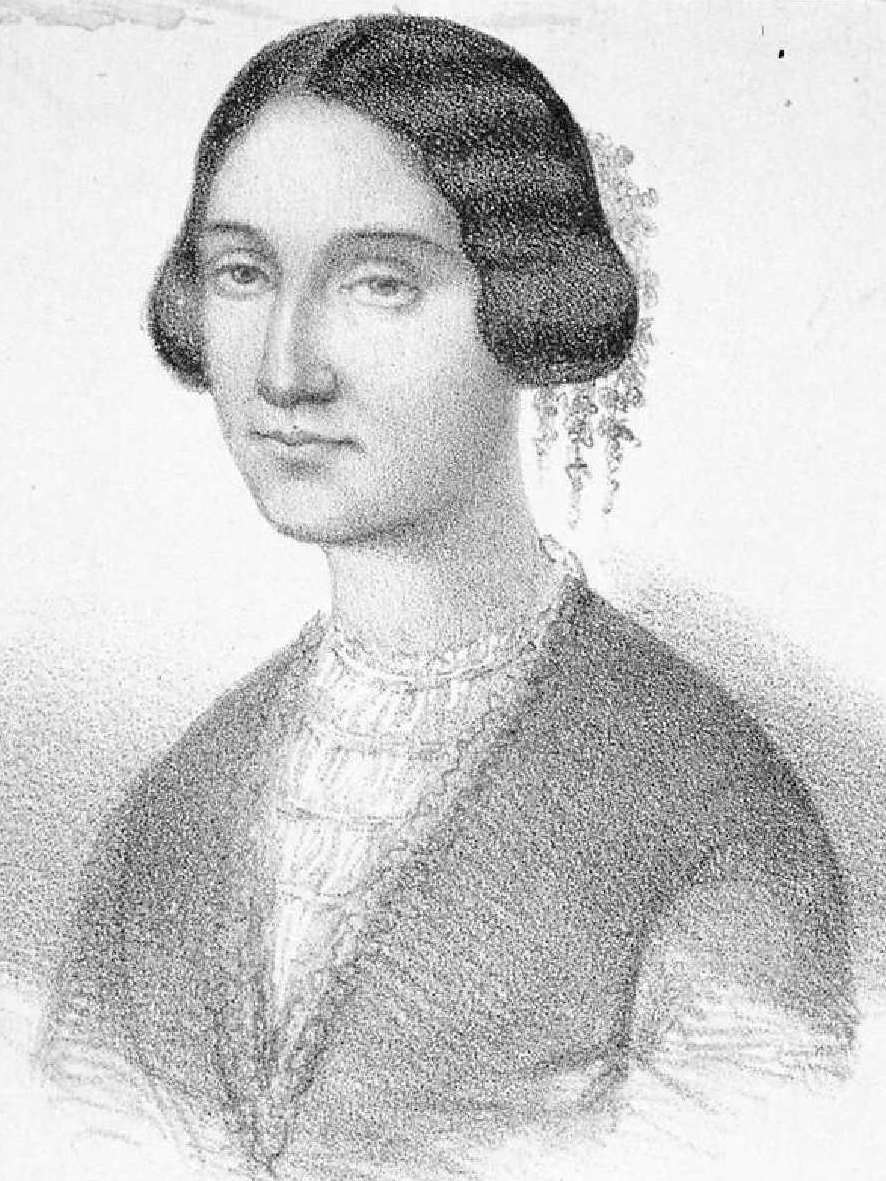
- Lithograph portrait by Leopoldo López de Gonzalo
- Born: 15 September 1828; Tamarite de Litera, Spain
- Died: 1 December 1899 (aged 71); Zaragoza, Spain
- Occupation: Writer
- Spouse: Joaquín María Miranda (m. 1856; died 1884)

Dolores Cabrera y Heredia (15 September 1828 – 1 December 1899) was a Spanish Romantic poet and novelist. A native of Aragon, she moved throughout Spain first following her father, then her husband. She showed an early aptitude for poetry and wrote for most of her life.

== Biography ==
Dolores Cabrera y Heredia was born in Tamarite de Litera on 15 September 1828, the daughter of Gregoria Heredia Godino and career soldier Lorenzo Cabrera Purroy. She was educated at the Monastery of Las Salesas de Calatayud and, following her father's professional fortunes, she also resided in Pamplona (1844–1846), Madrid (1846–1851) and Jaca (1851).

From a very young age she showed a penchant for poetry. According to María del Pilar Sinués in a biography published in El Correo de la Moda: Álbum de señoritas (The Fashion Courier: Ladies Album), it was her mother who sent some of Cabrera y Heredia's poems to her friend Pedro de la Hoz, director of La Esperanza (The Hope), in 1847. He immediately published one of them. From that point on, Cabrera y Heredia became a regular contributor to numerous periodicals, including :La Velada, La Reforma, El Trono y la Nobleza, Los Niños de Eva, Libro de la Caridad, Album la Avellaneda, Brisas de Cuba, Ellas, Educación Pintoresca, and especially El Correo de la Moda (The Fashion Courier). For the latter, she wrote not only poetry, but also historical articles, biographies of famous women, and her novel Una perla y una lágrima (A Pearl and a Tear), based on a traditional Aragonese legend.

In 1856, she married professional soldier Joaquín María Miranda in Madrid, and she accompanied him to Valencia, Granada, and Saragossa. They had four children. He died in Ocaña, Spain on 24 July 1884.

She published the novel Quien bien ama nunca olvida (Who Loves Well Never Forgets) and the poetry collection A S.M. el Rey en la muerte de su inocente y augusto hijo el Príncipe de Asturias (To H.M. the King on the death of his innocent and august son the Prince of Asturias) in 1850. Her compositions appear in the books Corona poética ofrecida a SS.MM. la Reina Doña Isabel II y el Rey Don Francisco de Asís María, con motivo del nacimiento de su Augusta hija S.A.R. la Serma. Sra. Princesa Doña María Isabel Francisca de Borbón, en nombre de los poetas españoles (1851), Escritoras españolas contemporáneas (1880), and Poetas contemporáneos (1883). She was the lyricist of the "Hymn of Alfonso XII".

She died in Saragossa on December 1899. Her remains were moved to Madrid in 1911.

== Las violetas ==
In 1850, Cabrera y Heredia's poetry collection Las violetas (Violets) was published by Imprenta de la Reforma, with a preface by Gregorio Romero de Larrañaga. The book included 76 poems written between May 1847 and May 1850. The title refers to the evocative power of violets, whose scent transported her back to her childhood; that is why her poems are dedicated to her mother, her father, her sisters, and friends. Two are dedicated to Paulina Cabrero y Martínez, a composer and a singer in the Madrid court. Some of her feelings are expressed in vocabulary typical of love poems, leading some to interpret them as homoerotic.

Cabrera y Heredia constantly draws on nature in her poetry to reflect her state of mind. Ruins also appear as a symbol of the end of life, and she invokes common Romantic images such as the storm, gale, and specters. However, when she refers to unrequited love, she writes more intimate and personal poems. She identifies love with the flowers that give the work its title.

Some of the compositions (e.g. "Las golondrinas" (The Swallows), "Ausencia" (Absence), "A una bella" (To a Beautiful)) were influenced by the work of Gustavo Adolfo Bécquer.

== Hermandad Lírica ==
By publishing two poems in the work Los hijos de Eva. Semanario de literatura, ciencias y arte (The Children of Eve. Literature, Science and Art Weekly), under the direction of Ventura Ruiz Aguilera, Cabrera y Heredia came into contact with a group of Romantic poets known as Hermandad Lírica (The Lyrical Sisterhood). The sisterhood's most prominent writer was Carolina Coronado. Other members included Amalia Fenollosa, Robustiana Armiño, and Vicenta García Miranda. All were born around 1820, belonged to the bourgeoisie, were self-taught, and shared a friendship of mutual encouragement and support through letters written to each other. They often discussed topics such as the painful fate of women and the injustice and oppression to which they were subjected. They claimed access to culture, intellectual activity, and status as writers. Cabrera y Heredia wrote complaints about the harassment the writers suffered.

== Recognition ==
Dolores Cabrera y Heredia enjoyed the favor of the public and critics, and was awarded several literary honors. In 1860, she was received as an academic and professor of the Academy of Sciences and Letters of the Artistic and Literary Lyceum of Granada; in 1865 she was declared a faculty member of the Literature Section of the Artistic and Literary Lyceum of Zaragoza. In 1869, she joined the Artistic and Women's Literature Athenaeum in Madrid, of which she was a merit partner.

In the last years of her life she was blind, which led Jerónimo Borao to dedicate a sonnet to her on 8 December 1874, entitled: "A Doña Dolores Cabrera de Miranda. Distinguida poetisa privada de la vista" (To Dolores Cabrera de Miranda: Distinguished Poet Deprived of Sight). The poet Miguel Agustín Príncipe also dedicated a fable to her in his 1861 work Fábulas en verso castellano y en variedad de metros (Fables in Castilian Verse and in a Variety of Meters).
