= Manuela Cambronero =

Spanish writer

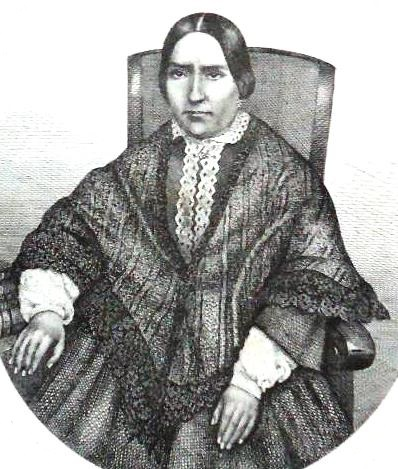
- Born: Manuela María Cambronero de Lana Peña c. 1820; A Coruña, Spain
- Died: c. 1854
- Occupation: Writer
- Spouse: Lorenzo Caballero

Manuela María Cambronero de Lana Peña (c. 1820 – c. 1854) was a Spanish writer.

== Career ==
Born in A Coruña around 1820, little is known about Cambronero's life. Her father tragically disappeared, her brother was mentally ill, and Manuela and her husband Lorenzo Caballero suffered from serious ailments. She lived in Cádiz and Valladolid.

In Valladolid she premiered her play Sáfira, with great public success, as it was published in the Revista de Teatro (Theater Magazine). The young author, who was 20 years old, was also advised to make the last two acts into a single one.

She contributed to the magazine Galicia: Revista Universal de este Reino, published in A Coruña from 1860 to 1865. Her poems were written in Castilian Spanish rather than Galician. In one entitled A la Coruña, she continues the fashion of exalting her homeland, describing the landscape in a pleasant and nostalgic way. It is verse with a Costumbrist theme, with the meter and rhyme typical of erudite poetry. Her work also appeared in 1862's Álbum de la Caridad, along with that of poets such as Rosalía de Castro.

She was the first Latin American woman to publish a novel in Venezuela, as a folletín of the Diario de Avisos between March and April 1853.

== Hermandad Lírica ==
She was part of the group called Hermandad Lírica (Lyrical Sisterhood), along with poets such as Amalia Fenollosa – with whom she maintained an intense epistolary relationship – Vicenta García Miranda, Carolina Coronado, Ángela Grassi, and Robustiana Armiño. She published in El Pensil del Bello Sexo, a supplement to the magazine El Genio, directed by Victor Balaguer, which is considered the first anthology of Spanish women writers.

== Works ==
- Sáfira (Valladolid, 1842), a historical drama in five acts that deals with the love affair between a Muslim woman, Sáfira, and a Christian, Don Manrique
- El Ramillete: Inés (1846), novella
- Días de convalecencia (A Coruña, Domingo Puja, 1852), collection of poems and novellas
