= CD Altorricón =

Spanish football team

Altorricón
- Full name: Club Deportivo Altorricón
- Founded: 1930
- Ground: Municipal, Altorricón, Aragón, Spain
- Capacity: 2,000
- Chairman: José Miguel Zurita
- Manager: Félix Jiménez
- League: Regional Preferente – Group 1
- 2024–25: Regional Preferente – Group 1, 11th of 18
- Website: https://cdaltorricon.com/
Home colours	Away colours

Club Deportivo Altorricón is a Spanish football team based in Altorricón, in the autonomous community of Aragón. Founded in 1930, it plays in Regional Preferente – Group 1, holding home games at Municipal, with a 2,000-seat capacity.

== Season to season ==
Season	Tier	Division	Place	Copa del Rey
1947–48	4	1ª Reg.	6th	
1948–1954	DNP			
1954–55	5	2ª Reg.	4th	
1955–56	5	2ª Reg.	(R)	
1956–1967	DNP			
1967–68	5	2ª Reg.	6th	
1968–69	6	2ª Reg.	11th	
1969–70	6	2ª Reg.	2nd	
1970–71	6	2ª Reg.	9th	
1971–72	6	2ª Reg.	11th	
1972–73	DNP			
1973–74	7	2ª Reg.	5th	
1974–75	7	2ª Reg.	7th	
1975–76	7	2ª Reg.	12th	
1976–77	7	2ª Reg.	10th	
1977–78	7	2ª Reg.	11th	
1978–79	7	2ª Reg.	10th	
1979–80	7	2ª Reg.	9th	
1980–81	7	2ª Reg.	10th	
1981–82	7	2ª Reg.	7th	

Season	Tier	Division	Place	Copa del Rey
1982–83	DNP			
1983–84	7	2ª Reg.	15th	
1984–1988	DNP			
1988–89	7	2ª Reg.	5th	
1989–90	7	2ª Reg.	4th	
1990–91	7	2ª Reg.	13th	
1991–1995	DNP			
1995–96	7	2ª Reg.	7th	
1996–97	7	2ª Reg.	7th	
1997–98	7	2ª Reg.	9th	
1998–99	7	2ª Reg.	1st	
1999–2000	6	1ª Reg.	2nd	
2000–01	5	Reg. Pref.	2nd	
2001–02	4	3ª	20th	
2002–03	5	Reg. Pref.	3rd	
2003–04	5	Reg. Pref.	6th	
2004–05	5	Reg. Pref.	15th	
2005–06	6	1ª Reg.	1st	
2006–07	5	Reg. Pref.	4th	
2007–08	5	Reg. Pref.	7th	

Season	Tier	Division	Place	Copa del Rey
2008–09	5	Reg. Pref.	7th	
2009–10	5	Reg. Pref.	3rd	
2010–11	4	3ª	17th	
2011–12	5	Reg. Pref.	3rd	
2012–13	5	Reg. Pref.	1st	
2013–14	4	3ª	20th	
2014–15	5	Reg. Pref.	3rd	
2015–16	5	Reg. Pref.	11th	
2016–17	5	Reg. Pref.	16th	
2017–18	6	1ª Reg.	1st	
2018–19	5	Reg. Pref.	18th	
2019–20	6	1ª Reg.	9th	
2020–21	6	1ª Reg.	3rd	
2021–22	7	1ª Reg.	2nd	
2022–23	6	Reg. Pref.	7th	
2023–24	6	Reg. Pref.	10th	
2024–25	6	Reg. Pref.	11th	
2025–26	6	Reg. Pref.		

- 3 seasons in Tercera División
