= La Litera =

Coordinates: 41°53.15′N 0°23.57′E

La Litera/La Llitera
- Comarca
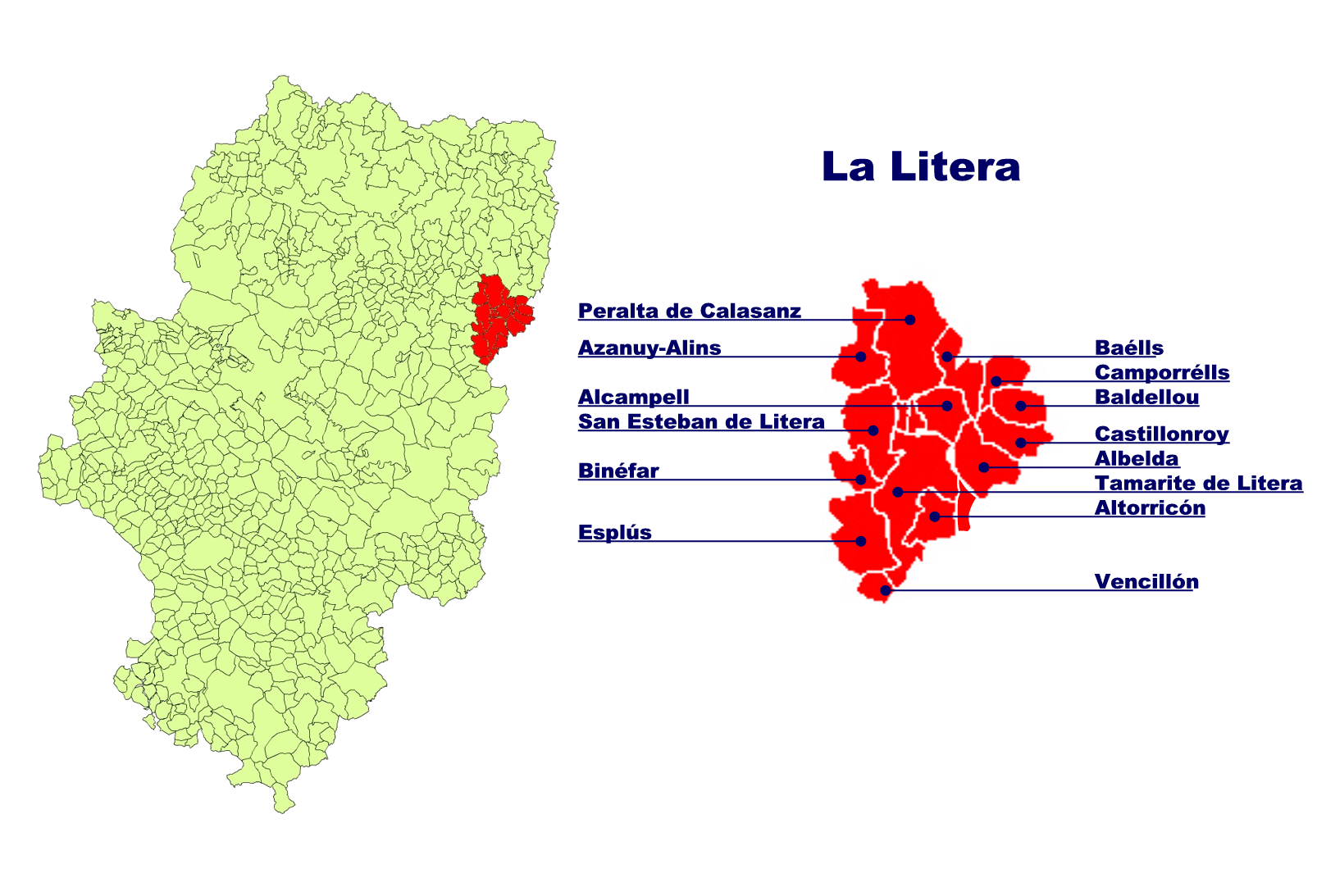
- Country: Spain
- Autonomous community: Aragon
- Province: Huesca
- Capital: Binéfar/Binèfar

Area
  - Total: 733.9 km^{2} (283.4 sq mi)

Population
  - Total: 18,847
  - Density: 25.68/km^{2} (66.51/sq mi)
- Time zone: UTC+1 (CET)
  - Summer (DST): UTC+2 (CEST)

La Litera (Spanish: [la liˈteɾa]) or La Llitera (Catalan: [la ʎiˈteɾa]) (Aragonese: A Litera) is an Aragonese comarca in the south-east of the province of Huesca.

Its cultural capital is Tamarite de Litera, its administrative capital is Binefar and it borders the comarques of Ribagorza, Somontano de Barbastro, Cinca Medio, Bajo Cinca in Aragon and Noguera and Segrià in Catalonia.

Its west half side belongs to the Catalan-speaking strip in eastern Aragon known as La Franja.

== Municipal terms ==
List of villages on the comarca. The Catalan version of the names of the towns are in brackets:

- Albelda
- Alcampell (El Campell)
- Altorricón (El Torricó)
- Azanuy-Alins (Sanui i Alins)
- Baélls (Baells)
- Baldellou (Valldellou)
- Binéfar (Binèfar)
- Camporrélls (Camporrells)
- Castillonroy (Castellonroi)
- Esplús
- Peralta de Calasanz (Peralta de Calassanç)
- San Esteban de Litera (Sant Esteve de Llitera)
- Tamarite de Litera (Tamarit de Llitera)
- Vencillón (Vensilló)
