= Matilde Camus =

Spanish poet (1919–2012)

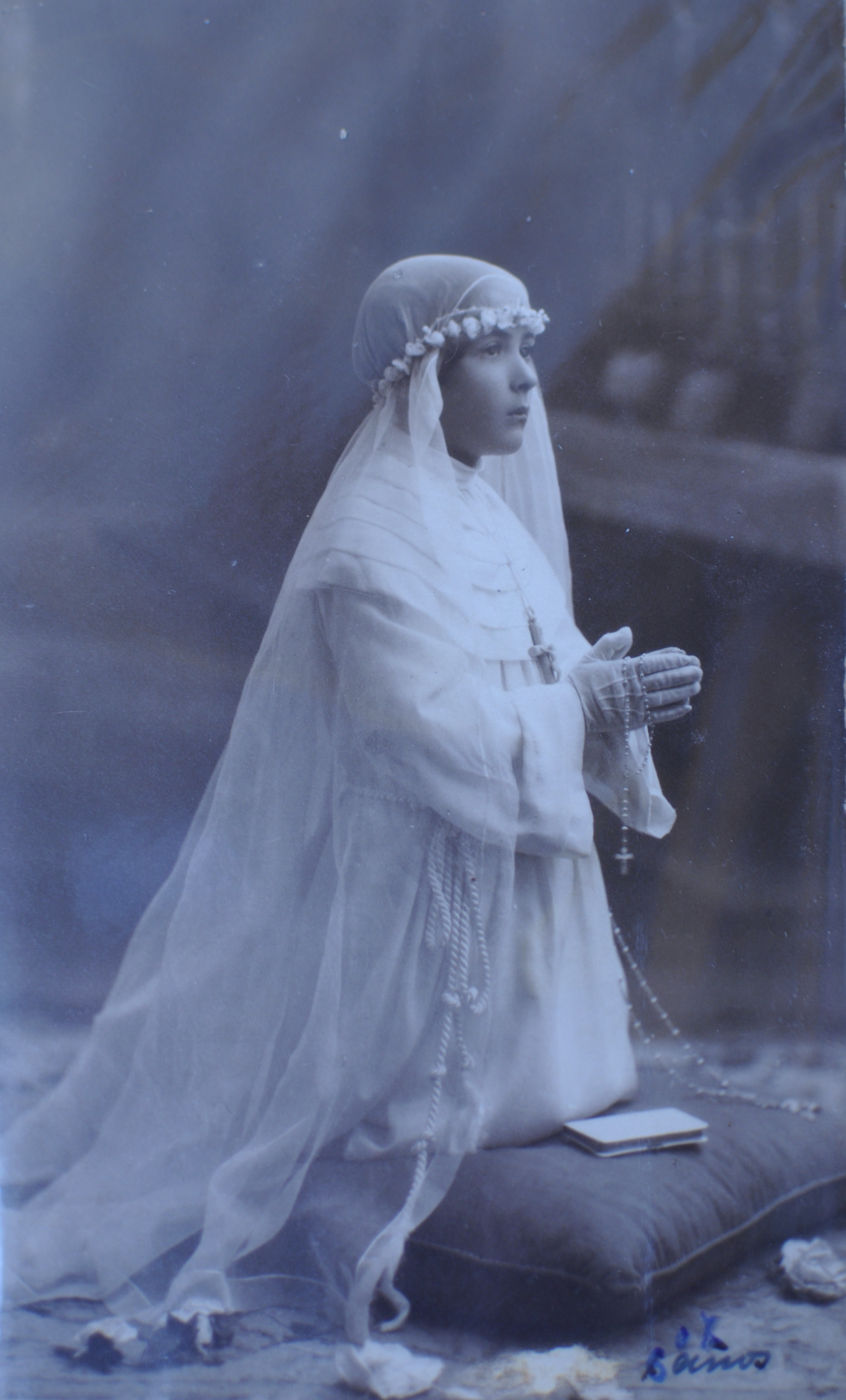
- Matilde Camus
- Born: 26 September 1919; Cantabria, Spain
- Died: 28 April 2012 (aged 92); Cantabria, Spain
- Occupation: Poetry

Aurora Matilde Gómez Camus (26 September 1919 – 28 April 2012) was a Spanish poet from Cantabria who also wrote non-fiction.

== Life and career ==
Aurora Matilde Gómez Camus was born in Santander, Cantabria on 26 September 1919, the daughter of Francisco Gómez Landeras and Matilde Camus del Villar.

In the 1920s, Matilde Camus attended the Colegio de San José, and later on the Instituto de Santa Clara for seven years. She married Justo Guisández García in 1943. She had four children Justo Francisco, Francisco Javier, Matilde and Miguel Ángel.

Matilde Camus wrote poetry book Voces in 1969.

Camus died in Santander, Cantabria, on 28 April 2012.

== Research works ==
- Vicenta García Miranda, una poetisa extremeña ("Vicenta García Miranda a poet from Extremadura-Spain").
- XL Aniversario del Centro de Estudios Montañeses ("XL Anniversary of the Centro de Estudios Montañeses", 1976).
- Santander y el Nuevo Mundo ("Santander and the New World", 1979).
- Acciones de Guerra en Santander del séptimo ejército (1811-1813) ("War actions in Santander of the 7th Army 1811-1813)", 1979).
- Historia del Lugar de Monte ("History of Monte", 1985).
- Historia de San Román de la Llanilla ("History of San Román de la Llanilla", 1986).
- Orizzonti di Gloria ("Glorious horizons", 1988).
- Efemérides del Lugar de Monte I ("Calendar of anniversary dates of Monte I", 1989).
- Monasterio de San Pedro de Rocas y otras ermitas ("Monastery of San Pedro de Rocas and other hermitages", 1990).
- Historia del Lugar de Cueto I" ("History of Cueto I", 1990).
- Efemérides del Lugar de Peñacastillo" ("Calendar of anniversary dates of Peñacastillo", 1992).
- Historia del Lugar de Cueto II" ("History of Cueto II", 1992).
- Prolegómenos del Cementerio Protestante de Santander y su evolución histórica ("Prolegomena of the Evangelic Graveyard of Santander and its historic evolution", 1993).
- Efemérides del Lugar de Monte II ("Calendar of anniversary dates of Monte II", 1995).
- Mayorazgo de la Casa Mantilla de Fontibre (Reinosa) ("Right of primogeniture of the Family Mantilla in Fontibre (Reinosa)", 1999).

== Poetry ==
- Voces ("Voices", 1969).
- Vuelo de estrellas ("Stars flight", 1969).
- Manantial de amor ("Love Spring", 1972).
- Bestiario poético ("Poetic book of animals", 1973).
- Templo del Alba ("Temple of Dawn", 1974).
- Siempre amor ("Forever Love", 1976).
- Cancionero de Liébana ("Collection of verse of Liebana", 1977).
- Corcel en el tiempo ("Steed of the time", 1979).
- Perfiles ("Profiles", 1980).
- He seguido tus huellas ("I have followed your footprints", 1981).
- Testigo de tu marcha ("Witness of your departure", 1981).
- Testimonio ("Testimony", 1982).
- La preocupación de Miguel Ángel ("The concern of Miguel Ángel", 1982).
- Tierra de palabras ("Land of words", 1983).
- Coral montesino ("Chorale of Monte", 1983).
- Raíz del recuerdo ("Root of remembrance", 1984).
- Cristales como enigmas ("Glasses as enigma", 1985).
- Sin teclado de fiebre ("Without a fever keyboard", 1986).
- Santander en mi sentir ("Santander in my heart", 1989).
- Sin alcanzar la luz ("Without reaching the Light", 1989).
- El color de mi cristal ("The colour of my glasses", 1990).
- Tierra de mi Cantabria ("Cantabria, my land", 1991).
- Amor dorado ("Golden Love", 1993).
- Ronda de azules ("Blue avenue", 1994).
- Vuelo de la mente ("Mind flight", 1995).
- Reflexiones a medianoche ("Midnight thoughts", 1996).
- Mundo interior ("Inner World", 1997).
- Fuerza creativa ("Creative strength", 1998).
- Clamor del pensamiento ("Clamour of thought", 1999).
- Cancionero multicolor ("Multicolour collection of verses", 1999).
- La estrellita Giroldina ("Giroldina the star", 1999).
- Prisma de emociones ("Prism of emotions", 2000).
- Motivos alicantinos ("Motif from Alicante").
