= Altorricón =

Coordinates: 41°48′N 0°24′E

Altorricón/El Torricó
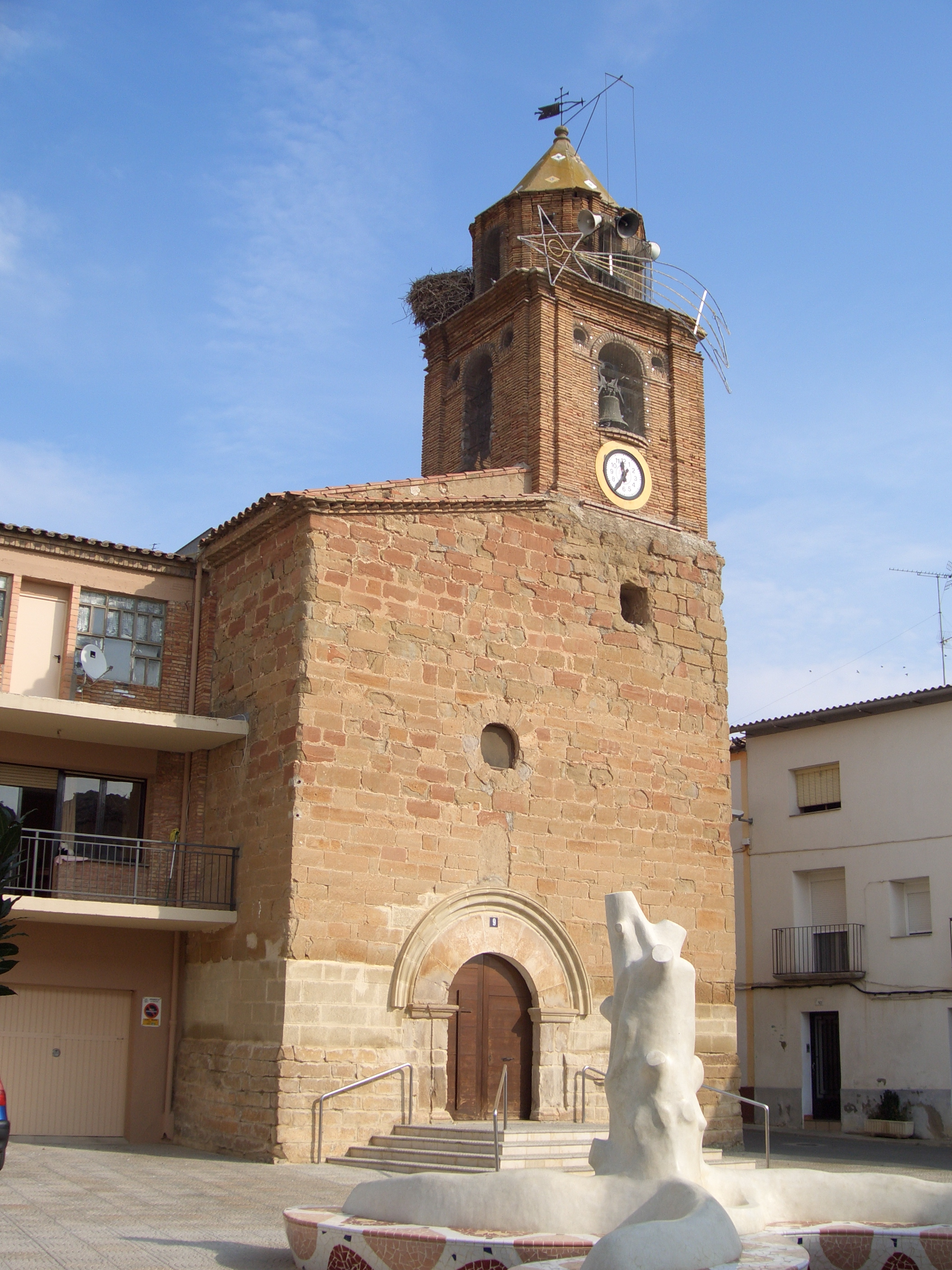
- Main church in Altorricon

- Flag Coat of arms
- Interactive map of Altorricón/El Torricó
- Country: Spain
- Autonomous community: Aragon
- Province: Huesca
- Comarca: La Litera
- Municipality: Altorricón/El Torricó

Government

Area
  - Total: 32.03 km^{2} (12.37 sq mi)

Population (2025-01-01)
  - Total: 1,504
  - Density: 46.96/km^{2} (121.6/sq mi)
  - Demonym: Altorriconan
- Time zone: UTC+1 (CET)
  - Summer (DST): UTC+2 (CEST)
- Website: http://www.altorricon.org

Altorricón (Spanish: [altoriˈkon]) or El Torricó (Catalan: [el toriˈko]) is a municipality located in the comarca of La Litera/La Llitera in the province of Huesca, Aragon, Spain. With an extension of 32.03 km^{2}, the municipal district of Altorricón lies on the southern part of La Llitera, limiting with El Segrià (Almacelles). The district is surrounded north and south by Tamarite de Litera. The municipality contains the town of Altorricón and the uninhabited towns of Cuquet, Montanera and Lo Tossal as well as the old church of San Bartolomé de Altorricón.

It has two official names Altorricón and El Torricó. The official name of Altorricón is considered to be incorrect by historians, although most of the population use that form of the name, in either the Spanish form of it Altorricón or the Catalan Altorricó. The name probably derived from Western Catalan "Torricó", or small tower, with Al- being a common prefix in Arab names. It's not clear what 'small tower' the name could refer to, but hypothesis point to Castle of Vallbona (Catalan Castell de Vallbona) situated north west from the town, or maybe some building that no longer exists in the center of the village.

The secondary water channel of La Mola, derived from the Canal d'Aragó i Catalunya crosses the municipal district diagonally from NW to SE, and is used to irrigate the land all across the territory. Multiple minor channels distribute the water, namely the ravine of San Bartomeu or the one of Clamorelles. A small section in the SW is drained by the torrent of Oriols and Vallbona.

Altorricón, right smack in the middle of the municipality, is crossed by the local road of Tamarite de Litera that springs out north from the national road N240 (Tarragona-San Sebastián). The locals call the portion of the road that heads south to the N240, la carretera del Butano (Catalan carretera del butà) in honor of the butane gas processing station that once existed at the intersection with the N240. The portion of the road that heads up north is simply called, carretera de Tamarite (Catalan carretera de Tamarit).

There is another road starting from the nucleus of the town that heads southwest and ends on Tamarite's railway station linking with the N240, a few kilometers west from where the road to Tamarite de Litera split up. The road also links Altorricón with the small community of La Melusa, and thus locals call the road carretera de La Melusa.

The local dialect is a variant of Catalan.

== See also ==
- List of municipalities in Huesca
