= Alcampell =

Coordinates: 41°54′N 0°25′E

Alcampell/El Campell
- municipality
- Flag Coat of arms
- Interactive map of Alcampell/El Campell
- Country: Spain
- Autonomous community: Aragon
- Province: Huesca
- Comarca: La Litera
- Municipality: Alcampell/El Campell

Area
  - Total: 58 km^{2} (22 sq mi)

Population (2025-01-01)
  - Total: 650
  - Density: 11/km^{2} (29/sq mi)
- Time zone: UTC+1 (CET)
  - Summer (DST): UTC+2 (CEST)

Alcampell (Spanish: [alkamˈpel]) or El Campell (Catalan: [el kamˈpeʎ]) is a municipality located in La Litera/La Llitera, province of Huesca, Aragon, Spain. According to the 2004 census (INE), the municipality has a population of 849 inhabitants.

== See also ==
- List of municipalities in Huesca
