= Cueto, Cantabria =

Locality in Santander, Cantabria, Spain

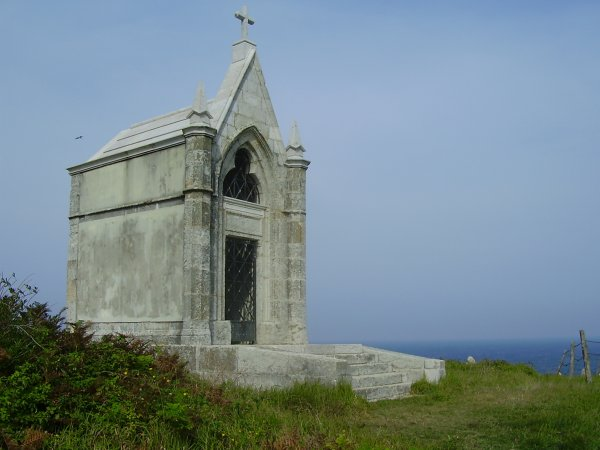
Panteón del Inglés Cemetery on the cliffs of Cueto

Cueto (43°29′N 3°02′W) is a locality in the municipality of Santander (Cantabria, Spain), north of the capital.

== Overview ==
Cueto faces northward toward the Atlantic Ocean and is mainly composed of high cliffs. Cueto is well known for its lighthouse, Faro de Cabo Mayor, built in 1839 by the engineer Felipe Bauzá. In recent years, as Santander has grown, it has started to encompass neighboring areas. Cueto is not highly inhabited despite being only 4 kilometers from downtown Santander. According to the 2004 census, the population of Cueto is 8,905 inhabitants.

== Notable people ==
- Fray Matías Abad (died 1649) - Franciscan priest

== Bibliography ==
- Historia del Lugar de Cueto I and Historia del Lugar de Cueto II By Matilde Camus
