= Vicenta García Miranda =

Spanish Romantic poet (1816–1877)

- Born: August 1816; Campanario, Spain
- Died: 1877 (aged 60–61); Campanario, Spain
- Occupation: Poet
- Spouse: Antonio Ángel de Salas (m. 1833; died 1843)

Vicenta García Miranda (August 1816 – 1877) was a Spanish Romantic poet.

== Biography ==
Vicenta García Miranda was born in Campanario in August 1816, the daughter of Antonio García Miranda, a pharmacist and lover of poetry and classical literature. Due to her father's illness, which kept him bedridden for eleven years, the family had to move to the house of a paternal uncle, which made it difficult for the future writer to study. She married medical student Antonio Ángel de Salas in July 1833, had a son in 1841, who died at eleven months, and was widowed in 1843. These sad events set the tone for a large part of her poetry.

In 1845, after reading a poem by Carolina Coronado, she felt that she could also write poetry. Reading Coronado's verses provoked a violent reaction in her that led to a personal rebirth and her poetic awakening. In her poem "La poetisa de aldea" (The Village Poetess), a reflection on one from Coronado, she claims the marginal figure of the female poet, alone and isolated in her literary work. She wrote a letter of introduction with two poems, and they began a long friendship in which Coronado was not only her friend but also her mentor. Thanks to Coronado, an ode by García Miranda was published in the magazine El Guadiana, dedicated to Diego García de Paredes, also from Extremadura.

She befriended other poets, such as Amalia Fenollosa, Manuela Cambronero, and Rogelia León, and participated in evenings of the Liceo de Badajoz with María Cabezudo and Carolina Coronado. The Liceo promoted the creation of a mixed-gender academy, and at its inauguration, a tribute was also paid to García Miranda and other writers. There she read her poems and wrote "Vamos a vindicar a Extremadura" (We are Going to Vindicate Extremadura) for the occasion. She was appointed as a facultative member of the group along with Robustiana Armiño.

Her fame grew, and she began to write for various magazines: Periódico científico, literario e industrial, directed by Ramón Ortiz de Zárate, that was published four times a month; El Lirio, El despertador montañés, from 1849 to 1853, of which Calixto Fernández Camporredondo was director, and with whom García Miranda began a long epistolary relationship; El Celtíbero de Segorbe (Castellón); Ellas; Órgano oficial del sexo femenino (Madrid), edited by Alicia Pérez de Gascuña, and where her feminist poem "Alzad, hermosas, la abatida frente" appeared.

She organized a literary gathering at her house from 1849 to 1875, from noon to 1:00 pm, which was attended by the intellectuals of Campanario. In 1855, she published an anthology of 75 poems, Flores del valle. Her last poems are from 1865 and 1866, and some were written at the Portuguese health resort Caldas da Rainha, where she resided on her doctor's advice. She died in Campanario in 1877.

At De Caldas da Rainha, she met a doctor with whom she maintained a friendship that was reflected in her letters. In them she shares her discouragement at her physical decline and progressive blindness. But she also informs him of her poems and prose writings. She expresses why she abandoned poetry in her later years – she initially began writing to alleviate the loneliness due to the deaths of her husband and son. Having a wide circle of literary friends, and their daily tertulia took away that need to write.

== Work ==
Her only published book, Flores del valle, comprises 75 poems with different themes. One of them is women and their position of submission to men, together with the need to seek new horizons. This was related to the topic of Romanticism: the escape from reality and the search for the exotic, as well as the desire for freedom, which is shown in the poem "A una calandria". She also defended women's role as poets, as proclaimed in the poem "Alzad, hermosas, la abatida frente". Another recurring theme in her poetry is nature revaluing the wild, in which she finds the faithful reflection of her poetic self.

== Hermandad Lírica ==
The influence of Carolina Coronado's poetry on García Miranda's is undeniable, with the latter considered to be one of her disciples. Together with Encarnación Calero de los Ríos, Robustiana Armiño, and Amalia Fenollosa, they formed a poetic group with mutual relationships, both lyrical and epistolary, which has been called the Hermandad Lírica (Lyrical Sisterhood). They were most active in the years from 1845 to 1955. Many of their poems are homoerotic, including several of García Miranda's. This was accepted at the time since it was understood as a support network between women poets. Furthermore, lesbianism was not seen as subverting the social order.

== Recognition ==
There are streets named for Vicenta García Miranda in Badajoz and in her hometown of Campanario.
