= El ángel del hogar =

1857 book by María del Pilar Sinués

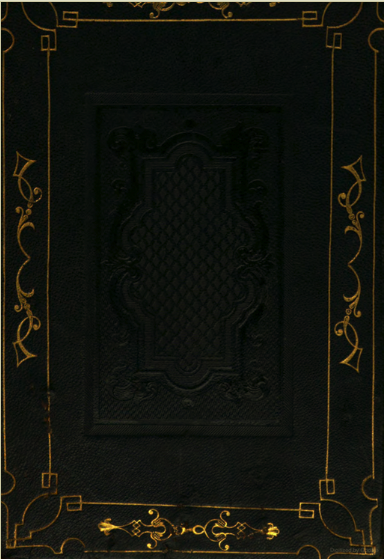
2nd edition, 1859

El ángel del hogar (The angel of the house) was a two-volume conduct book by María del Pilar Sinués de Marco, published in Madrid, Spain, in 1857. The title of this novel has been used to define the ideal of women in the 19th century. The book's success was enormous and it was reprinted for at least thirty years, the last edition being published in 1881. Like Coventry Patmore's narrative poem, The Angel in the House (1854), El ángel del hogar was a bestseller. The two works came to symbolize the Victorian feminine ideal.

The Spanish novel was prefaced by Ángela Grassi, also a writer and friend of Sinués. Grassi praised in it how Sinués intended to educate her readers in the values that would make them the "ideal woman". To this end, Sinués emphasized four basic points: motherhood, the main mission of women, - all the female characters are mothers and the only woman who does not have children and who is also an emancipated woman is unhappy and cruel, suicide being her end-; literature, which should only be done by women when the writer is addressing other women and the themes are to praise domestic life or morals; the domestic sphere, the only sphere in which women are fully realized; and religion, a fundamental pillar, since virtue and above all resignation are the basic axes in the life of a woman.

For this ideal of a woman, education was necessary, since in her role as an educator and competent wife, it was essential. She shared this idea with liberal thinkers. To make the reading of her work more comprehensible, Sinués interspersed pedagogical chapters with sentimental narratives in which the virtuous heroines distanced themselves from the immoral world. All the cases had been told to her by her mother or a friend. This made them more real.

== Adaptation ==
Sinués directed her weekly magazine El ángel del hogar, Revista semanal de Literatura, Teatro, Modas, Labores» (The Angel of the Home, Weekly magazine of Literature, Theater, Fashions, Labors) between 1864 and 1869, a publication on literature, theater, fashion, and work. From this magazine, she supported the Glorious Revolution of 1868 and dedicated articles on the initiatives of female instruction advocated by the Complutense University of Madrid in 1869.
