= La Violeta =

Women's and literary magazine in Spain (1862–1866

- Editor-in-chief: Valentín Melgar; Faustina Sáez de Melgar
- Categories: Women's magazine; Literary magazine; Education magazine
- Frequency: Weekly
- Founder: Faustina Sáez de Melgar
- Founded: 1862
- First issue: 7 December 1862
- Final issue: 31 December 1866
- Country: Spain
- Based in: Madrid
- Language: Spanish

La Violeta was a weekly women's magazine with a focus on fashion and literature based in Madrid, Spain. Its subtitle was Revista hispano-americana de literatura, ciencias, teatros y modas. The magazine was in circulation in the period 1862–1866, and had significant contributions to the education of women in the country.

== History and profile ==
La Violeta was established by Faustina Sáez de Melgar in 1862, and the first issue appeared on 7 December that year. The magazine was dedicated to Queen Isabel II who would become one of the subscribers of the magazine. Its headquarters was in Madrid.

The editors-in-chief of La Violeta were Faustina Sáez de Melgar and her husband, Valentín Melgar, who also financed it. The goal of the magazine which was published weekly on Sundays was to serve as a useful and moral guide to bourgeois women who were the members of the neo-Catholic current. However, the magazine also had male readers. The number of pages varied between eight and sixteen, and the magazine included many different topics, but one of the frequent ones was the examples of the Elizabethan literature written by women, including Rogelia León, Francisca Carlota de Riego Pina, Amalia Díaz, Elena G. de Avellaneda, Ángela Grassi and María José Zapata. Joaquina Carnicero published a fashion chronicle in the magazine, and Leandro A. Herrero contributed to the weekly magazine with articles on theatre. The contributors of the magazine, particularly Rogelia León, adopted abolitionist views and were very active in the abolitionist initiatives.

In 1864 La Violeta became an official textbook for high schools by a royal decree, and its subtitle was redesigned as de instrucción primaria, educación, literatura, ciencias, labores, salones, teatros y modas. The last issue of the magazine was published on 31 December 1866.
