= Rosario de Acuña =

Spanish author (1850–1923)

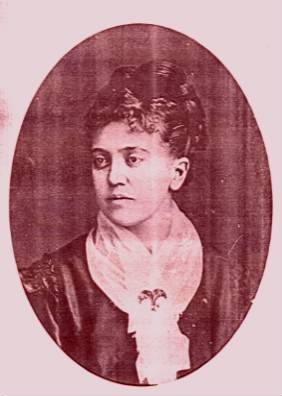
- Born: Rosario de Acuña y Villanueva; 1851; Madrid, Spain
- Died: 5 May 1923 (aged 71–72); Gijón, Spain
- Spouse: Lieutenant Rafael de Laiglesia (separated)
- Children: 2
- Writing career
- Pen name: Remigio Andrés Delafón

Rosario de Acuña y Villanueva de la Iglesia, better known by the short name Rosario de Acuña and the masculine pseudonym used for her writings, Remigio Andrés Delafón (1850 – 5 May 1923), was a Spanish author of dramas, essays, short stories, and poetry.

== Life ==
Born in Madrid, she wrote under the masculine pen name of Remigio Andres Delafon. In 1884, she became the first woman speaker in the Ateneo de Madrid. She was considered to be both controversial and a bold freethinker in her time. Her radical thinking and critique on many controversial subjects of religious dogmatism, atheistic approach, illegitimate births, civil marriage (with the eventuality of divorce) created serious controversies. Cited as the "first woman playwright to have a theater closed down", she died at her own home in Gijón, Asturias on 5 May 1923.

== Early life ==
She was born in Madrid in 1851, in a well-to-do family. Taught by her father, she started writing poetry in castilian early in life. Other than that, not much more is known about her early life. She got married at the age of 25 to Infantry Lieutenant Rafael de La Iglesia and resided in Pinto (Madrid). Some time later they separated and he died in 1900. She did not marry again.

== Career ==
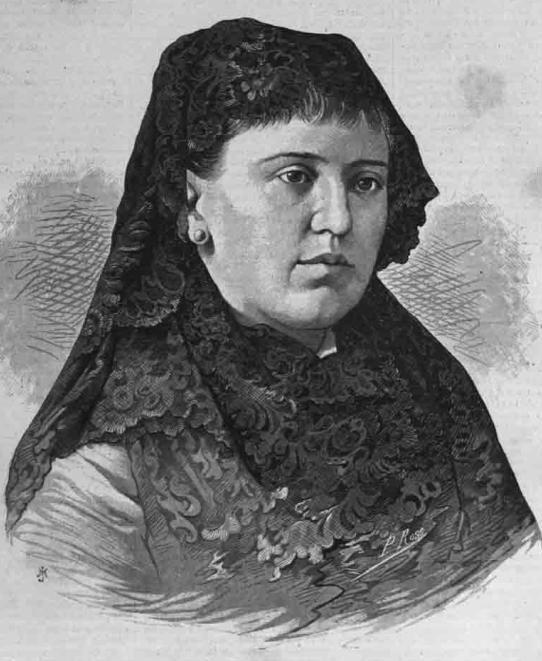

Her first publication was in 1874 in a local journal. In 1876, her first poetry based drama titled "Rienzi el tribuno" premiered at the Teatro Circo de Madrid, which received wide acclaim. In this drama, she presented in poetry form, a tragic theme highlighting the struggles that the Roman tribune Cola di Rienzo had to go through to bring to fore ancient Rome's greatness. In 1877, she published the play called "Amor a la patria" (Love of Country), depicting women's heroism as part of the peasants struggle against Napoleon Bonaparte's rule.

In 1884, she was the first woman speaker to read her poetry in the Ateneo de Madrid poetry evening. In 1891, she published "El padre Juan" (The Father John), dealing with the hypocritical nature of the clergy, which caused some controversy. This was followed by the "La voz de la patria" (Pregnant Woman), in 1893, which also resulted in a lot of controversy as the drama highlighted the shenanigans of a pregnant woman trying to stop her fiancé to enlist in the army.

She made significant contributions in poetry and some of them are: "Ecos del alma" (Echoes from the Soul) (1876); "Morirse a tiempo" (To Die on Time) (1880); "Sentir y pensar" (Feeling and Thought) (1884). In her approach to propagate the liberal social policy of the government she wrote the paper titled El crimen de la calle de Fuencarral; odia el delito y compadece al delincuente (The Crime of Fuencarral Street: Hate the Crime and Pity the Criminal) around 1880. This was based on a true crime of a murder case; her intent was to raise awareness of the social roots of crime. Her essays related to feminist issues are the "Consecuencias de la degeneración femenina" (Consequences of Female Degeneracy) (1888); and Cosas Mías (My Things) (1917). An advocator of civil marriage, she believed in liberation.

After the death of her husband in 1900, she shifted to Cueto (Cantabria) and started a poultry farm. At the same time she also started writing for the socialist weekly, Cantabrian and People's Voice. In 1909, she built her house on the top of a hill in Gijon and named her house as "Providence." As an article she had written in a Paris newspaper was very controversial, she was exiled to Portugal in 1911 for two years. On her return she collaborated with Virginia Gonzalez and Theodomir Menéndez (1919) in the activities of the socialist party.

She died at her home in Gijon on May 5, 1923.

== See also ==
- Hermandad Lírica
