= Rogelia León =

Spanish poet (1828–1870)

- Born: Rogelia León Nieto; 16 September 1828; Granada, Spain
- Died: 16 May 1870 (aged 41); Granada, Spain
- Occupation: Writer

Rogelia León Nieto (16 September 1828 – 16 May 1870) was a Spanish Romantic poet, playwright, essayist, and narrative writer.

== Biography ==
Rogelia León was born in Granada on 16 September 1828. She received an education proper to a noble family, attending the school of Santa Cruz de Granada and taking classes on literature that were offered at the Liceo Granada. These encouraged her to write poetry.

Her first poems were featured in the Granadan magazine El Capricho. She continued to publish in local periodicals such as El Eco de Occidente, El Álbum Granadino, La Alhambra, El Liceo Granadino, El Bético, El Liceo de Granada, El Jueves, and El Protector del Bello Sexo, then expanded to other Andalusian magazines. She eventually began writing for national publications such as La Mujer, El Fénix, La Aurora de la Vida, La Mujer Cristiana, El Museo Literario, and El Álbum de las Familias. She was a principal contributor to La Violeta, directed by Faustina Sáez de Melgar, writing poetry, novellas, and articles.

In 1857, her poetry collection Autos de la Alhambra was published. In one of the poems, the lyrical self is Sappho lamenting the predilection that men show towards beautiful and talented women.

She was an academic-teacher at the Liceo de Granada, a member of the Málaga Scientific, Literary, and Artistic Circle, and a member of the Madrid Scientific-Literary Academy.

Along with Gertrudis Gómez de Avellaneda, Concepción Arenal, and Antonia Díaz Fernández de Lamarque, she was a defender of the abolition of slavery. Her "Canción del esclavo" (Slave's Song) was published in La Violeta and Auras de la Alhambra, with a poem dedicated to the Cuban poet Gabriel de la Concepción Valdés.

Rogelia León died in Granada on 16 May 1870.

== Works ==
=== Poetry ===
- Autos de la Alhambra (1857)

=== Theater ===
- Fanni la escocesa, also known as Jeannie la escocesa, a three-act drama in verse, was the work that brought her the most literary fame. It premiered in Granada on 26 April 1857. Set in different parts of Great Britain, it develops the conflictive theme of the wars of religion that occurred during the Cromwell era.

=== Narrative ===
- El niño y el perro (1861, in La Aurora de la Vida)
- Una pobre niña y la caridad cristiana (1862, in La Violeta)
- La manijera de barro (1864, in La Violeta)
- La Casa de Castril (1865), a volume collecting various legends and traditions from Granada
