= Binéfar =

Coordinates: 41°51′N 0°18′E

- Flag Coat of arms
- Interactive map of Binéfar
- Country: Spain
- Autonomous community: Aragon
- Province: Huesca
- Municipality: Binéfar

Area
  - Total: 25.10 km^{2} (9.69 sq mi)

Population (2025-01-01)
  - Total: 10,235
  - Density: 407.8/km^{2} (1,056/sq mi)
- Time zone: UTC+1 (CET)
  - Summer (DST): UTC+2 (CEST)

Binéfar (Spanish: [biˈnefaɾ]) is a municipality located in the province of Huesca, Aragon, Spain. According to the 2008 census (INE), the municipality has a population of 9,288 inhabitants.

It is the home of the children's theatre group "Los Titiriteros de Binéfar".

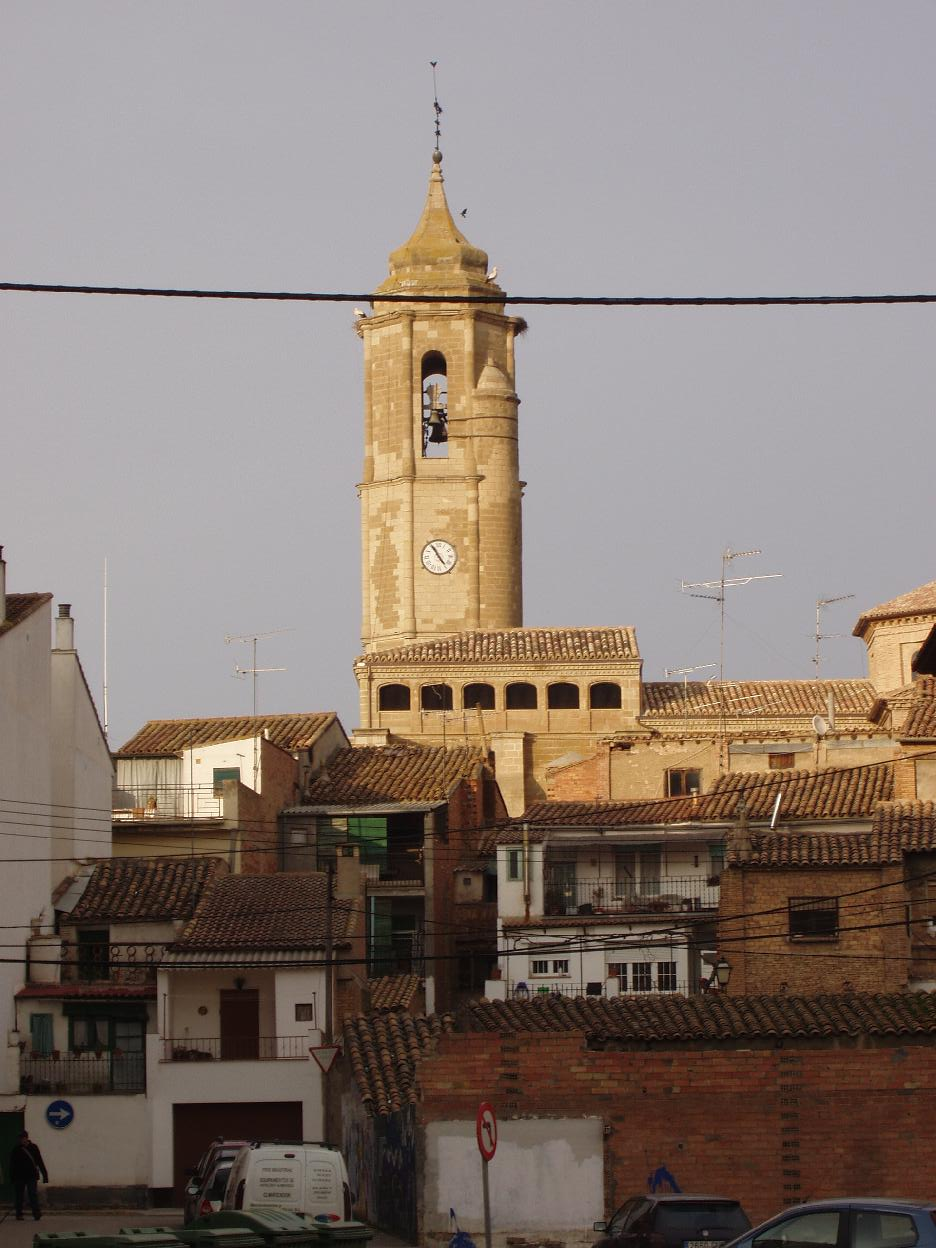
Church tower and houses in Binéfar, Huesca, Spain

== History ==
During the Spanish Civil War, the town participated in the Spanish revolution and was collectivised by the CNT.

== Notable people ==
- Agustín Abadía (born 15 April 1962) is a Spanish retired footballer who played as a left midfielder, and a current coach.

== See also ==
- List of municipalities in Huesca
