= Tamarite de Litera =

- Municipality
- Coat of arms

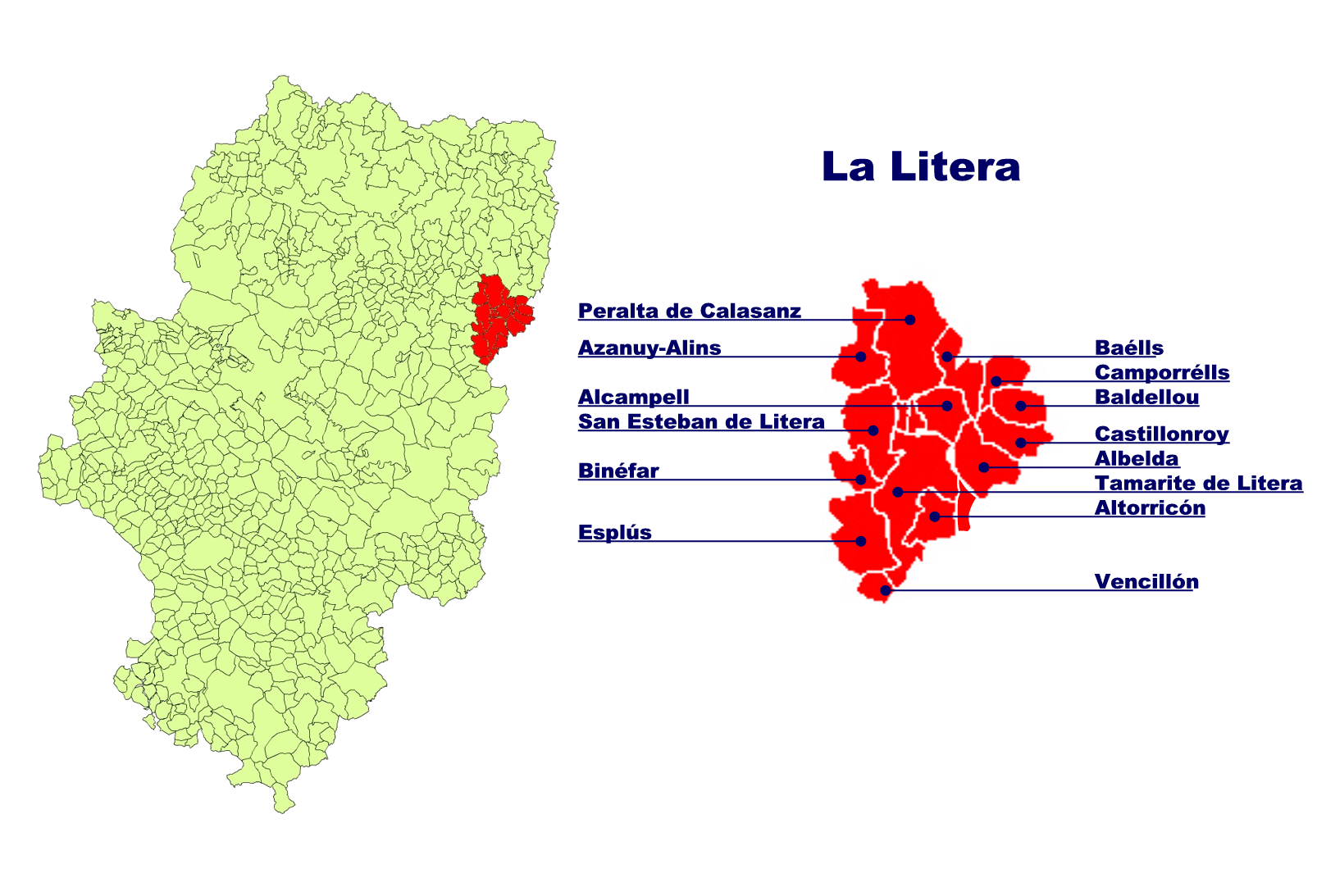

- Location in Spain Tamarite de Litera (Spain)
- Coordinates: 41°52′12″N 0°26′0″E
- Country: Spain
- Autonomous community: Aragon
- Province: Huesca
- Comarca: La Litera
- Judicial district: Monzón

Area
  - Total: 110.6 km^{2} (42.7 sq mi)
- Elevation: 360 m (1,180 ft)

Population (2025-01-01)
  - Total: 3,464
  - Density: 31.32/km^{2} (81.12/sq mi)
- Time zone: UTC+1 (CET)
  - Summer (DST): UTC+2 (CEST)
- Postal code: 22550

Tamarite de Litera (Catalan: Tamarit de Llitera) is a Spanish municipality located in the province of Huesca, Aragon. It is the capital of the comarca of La Litera.

== Villages ==
- Tamarite de Litera.
- Algayón.
- La Melusa.

== History ==
The town was reconquered from the Moors by Alfonso I of Aragon in 1107.

== Famous natives ==
- Fernando Aranda, former motorcycle champion.
- Dolores Cabrera y Heredia

== See also ==
- La Franja
- List of municipalities in Huesca
