= Faustina Sáez de Melgar =

Spanish writer and journalist (1834–1895)

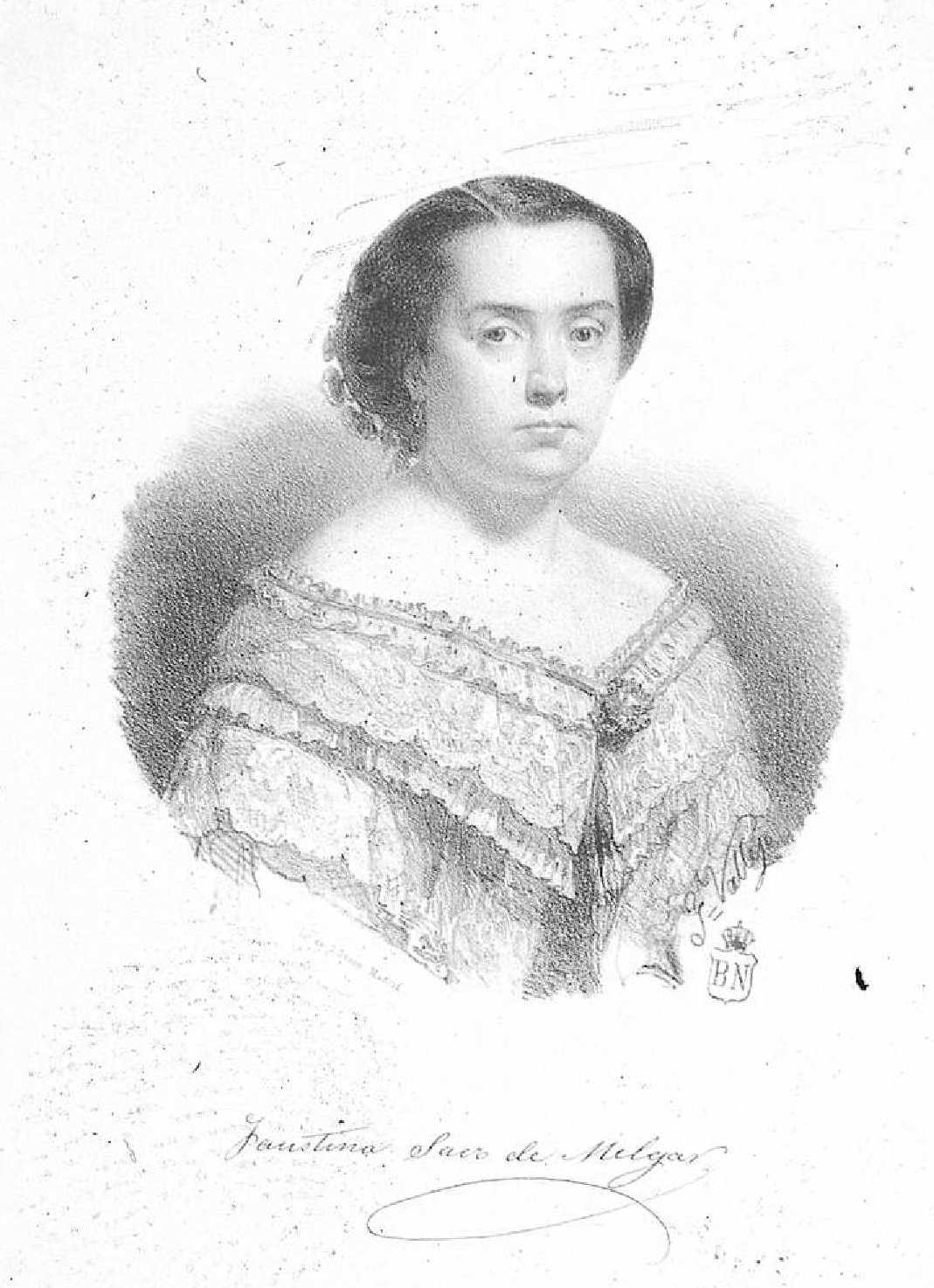
- Born: Faustina Sáez y Soria; 15 February 1834; Villamanrique de Tajo, Spain
- Died: 19 March 1895 (aged 61); Madrid, Spain
- Occupations: Writer, journalist
- Spouse: Valentín Melgar y Chicharro
- Children: Gloria Melgar Sáez

Faustina Sáez de Melgar, née Faustina Sáez y Soria (1834–1895) was a Spanish writer and journalist. She was mother of the composer and painter Gloria Melgar Sáez.

== Biography ==
Faustina Sáez y Soria began to write her first literary texts at age nine, an activity in which she persisted despite her father's opposition. At seventeen she published her first poem in El Correo de la Moda; a year later she was an assiduous contributor to this and other magazines such as Álbum de Señoritas and Ellas.

She married Valentín Melgar y Chicharro, a state official who would go on to hold various positions in Spain and in colonies such as the Philippines, Cuba, and Puerto Rico. The couple moved to Madrid. There her first son died in 1858. In 1859 her daughter Gloria was born and she published her poetry book La lira del Tajo y África y España, verses on the recent war in Morocco. In 1860 she had her first great success with the novel La pastora del Guadiela. This made her into a celebrity, allowing her to regularly publish extensive narratives and contribute to all types of newspapers and magazines, such as El Trono y la Nobleza, La Antorcha, El Occidente, La Aurora de la Vida, El Museo Literario, El Museo Universal, La Iberia, Los Sucesos, La Mujer, La Ilustración de Madrid, El Recreo de las Familias, La Moda Elegante Ilustrada, El Bazar, El Salón de la Moda, El Resumen, La Edad Dichosa, La Discusión, La Época, El Correo de Ultramar (of Paris), El Siglo (of Havana), and La Concordia (of Caracas). She also founded and directed La Violeta (of Madrid), La Canastilla Infantil, and Paris Charmant Artistique (of Paris). In 1873 her daughter Virginia was born, and in 1880 she moved to Paris.

Due to her active presence in the culture of her time, she became involved in all kinds of social causes and joined the Committee of Ladies of the Spanish Abolitionist Society. She presided at the Artistic and Literary Athenaeum of Ladies (1869) and was Vice-President of Honor of the Women's Section of the Chicago World's Fair (1893). She was an active advocate for abolitionism and the so-called feminismo de la diferencia (feminism of difference). That is to say, they did not demand female emancipation, nor equality of rights with men; they simply advocated greater education for women with the sole objective of having basic knowledge to be able to have conversations with their husband, and thus not boring him. They considered this to be the main cause of matrimonial breakups at the time.

== Works ==
=== Publicist ===
Faustina Sáez de Melgar was the founder and director of the magazine La Violeta (1862–1866), obligatory subscription publication for the Normal Schools of Teachers and Higher Schools of Girls, by Royal Order of Isabella II. She also held the position of director of other similar publications such as La Mujer, La Canastilla Infantil, and Paris charmant artistique (a French periodical).

=== Translations ===
She translated many works, including:

- Los dramas de la bolsa (1884), by Pierre Zaccone
- Los vecinos (1883), by Fredrika Bremer
- La sociedad y sus costumbres (1883), by Madame de Watteville
- Flores y perlas (1889), in which she translated several poetic compositions by Carmen Sylva, Queen consort of Romania

=== Poetry ===
- La lira del Tajo (1859)

=== Narratives ===
- La pastora de Guadiela (Madrid: Bernabé Fernández, 1860), often reprinted
- La marquesa de Pinares (Madrid: Bernabé Fernández, 1861), continuation of the above
- Los miserables de España o Secretos de la Corte (Barcelona: Vicente Castaños, 1862–63), 2 volumes
- Matilde o El ángel de Val de Real (Madrid: Manuel de Rojas, 1862)
- La higuera de Villaverde. Leyenda tradicional (Madrid: Imprenta de Bernabé Fernández, 1860). Contains her first biography by María Pilar Sinués Navarro.
- Ecos de la gloria. Leyendas históricas (Madrid: Antonio Pérez Dubrull, 1863)
- Ángela o El ramillete de jazmines (Madrid: R. Vicente, 1865-1866), 3 volumes
- Adriana o La quinta de Peralta (Madrid: F. de Rojas, 1866)
- La loca del encinar (Madrid: Imprenta J. A. García, 1867)
- Amar después de la muerte (Barcelona: Imprenta Verdaguer, 1867). Second part of the novel Adriana o La quinta de Peralta (Madrid, 1866).
- La cruz del olivar (Madrid: F. Peña, 1868), novel
- "María la cuarterona o La esclavitud en las Antillas" (1868). Text appeared in La Iberia number 24, 24 October 1868.
- Rosa, la cigarrera de Madrid (Barcelona: Imprenta Hispana y Juan Pons, 1872 and 1878, 2 volumes)
- "El hogar sin fuego" (La Iberia, 18 July 1876). Was translated into Italian (in a version which was also a significant success)
- La abuelita (Barcelona: Librería de Juan y Antonio Bastinos ed., 1877). Stories grouped under the generic pseudonym "Cuentos de aldea").
- Inés, o La hija de la caridad (Madrid: Rojas, 1878, 2 volumes)
- Sendas opuestas (Madrid: Rojas, 1878). At the end, another narrative by the author: La bendición paterna.
- El collar de esmeraldas (Madrid: Pedro Núñez, 1879).
- El deber cumplido (Madrid: Pedro Núñez, 1879). At the end, the novel previously mentioned in La loca del encinar.
- Aurora y felicidad (Barcelona: Salvador Manero, 1881). Novel of manners.
- Fulvia o Los primeros cristianos (Madrid, 1889). Historical novel.
- El trovador del Turia (Memorias de una religiosa) (Madrid: Imprenta de "La Guirnalda", 1890). El hogar sin fuego and La bendición paterna were reprinted in the same edition.
- Alfonso el Católico (Madrid: Fernando Fe, s. a.)

=== Theater ===
- Contra indiferencia, celos Madrid: José Rodríguez, 1875, comic play.
- La cadena rota (Madrid: F. Macías, 1879). Abolitionist drama in verse.

=== Articles and essays ===
- "Deberes de la mujer" (Madrid: R. Vicente, 1866)
- "Un libro para mis hijas. Educación cristiana y social de la mujer" (Barcelona: Librería de Juan and Antonio Bastinos ed., 1877)
- "Epistolario manual para señoritas" (Barcelona: Librería de Juan y Antonio Bastinos ed., 1877)

=== Anthologies ===
- Páginas para las niñas (Barcelona: Imprenta de J. Jepús, 1881). Official reading book in the Spanish school system by Royal Order of 20 December 1886 and 12 May 1885.
- La semana de los niños (París: Ch. Bouret, 1882). "Instructional readings for children".
- Romances históricos y lecturas amenas para los niños de ambos sexos en las escuelas y las señoritas adolescentes (Madrid: Imprenta de Ramón Angulo, 1888)
- Las españolas, Americanas y Lusitanas pintadas por sí mismas (1886)
