= Ángela Grassi =

Spanish writer (1826–1883)

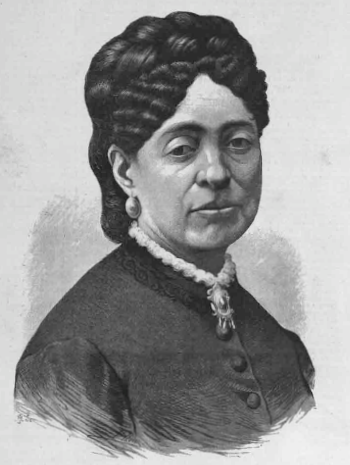
- Angela Grassi portrait
- Born: 2 August 1826; Crema, Italy
- Died: September 17, 1883 (aged 57); Madrid, Spain
- Occupation: Writer

Ángela Grassi (2 August 1826, in Crema – 17 September 1883, in Madrid) was a Spanish writer and novelist of romantics, best remembered for her romantic novel El copo de nieve (1876).
