= Carolina Coronado =

Spanish writer (1820–1911)

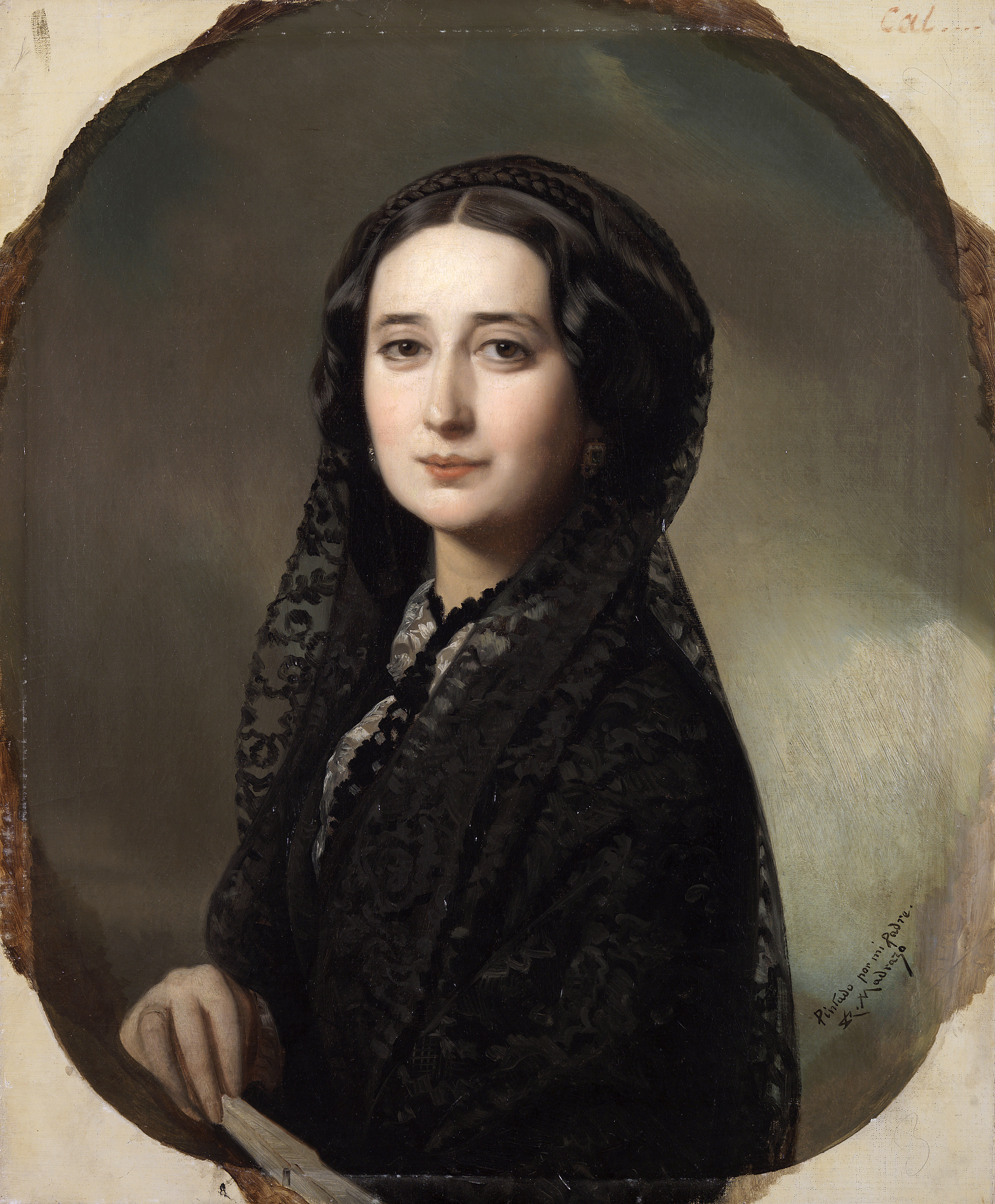
- Portrait of Carolina Coronado (c.1855), by Federico de Madrazo (Museo del Prado, Madrid).
- Born: Victoria Carolina Coronado y Romero de Tejada; 12 December 1820; Almendralejo, Kingdom of Spain
- Died: 15 January 1911 (aged 90); Lisbon, Kingdom of Portugal
- Occupations: Poet, Novelist, Playwright
- Spouse: Horatio Justus Perry
- Partner: Alberto
- Children: 3
- Relatives: Ramón Gómez de la Serna
- Writing career
- Genre: Romanticism

Victoria Carolina Coronado y Romero de Tejada (12 December 1820 – 15 January 1911) was a Spanish writer, famous for her poetry, considered the equivalent of contemporary Romantic authors like Rosalía de Castro. As one of the most well-known poets writing in mid-19th-century Spain, she also played a diplomatic role (she was married to Horatio Perry, the American Secretary of the U.S. Legation in Madrid.) She both negotiated with the Spanish royal family in private and, through a series of widely published poems, promoted the aims of the Lincoln administration, especially abolition of slavery.

== Youth ==
Victoria Carolina Coronado y Romero de Tejada was born on 12 December 1820 in Almendralejo, Badajoz in the province of Extremadura. She was the daughter of Nicolás Coronado y Gallardo and María Antonia Romero de Tejada y Falcón. Her family was well-to-do, but they adhered to a progressive ideology that caused her father and grandfather to be persecuted. After moving to the provincial capital of Badajoz, Carolina received the formal education for girls of her time: fashion and housework. Despite this, she demonstrated at an early age an interest in literature, and she began to read works from widely varying genres. She was self-taught in reading and writing and continued her studies despite the criticism of her family. Thanks to this activity she gained a natural ability to compose verses. Her lines were spontaneous and charged with feeling. Many of her poems were based on impossible loves. Her most notable subject was Alberto – who may not even have existed.

Her romantic temperament could also have been influenced by the chronic catalepsy from which she suffered. She even appeared to "die" on several occasions, leading her to interest with the theme of death. She would eventually embalm her deceased husband.

== Life in Madrid ==
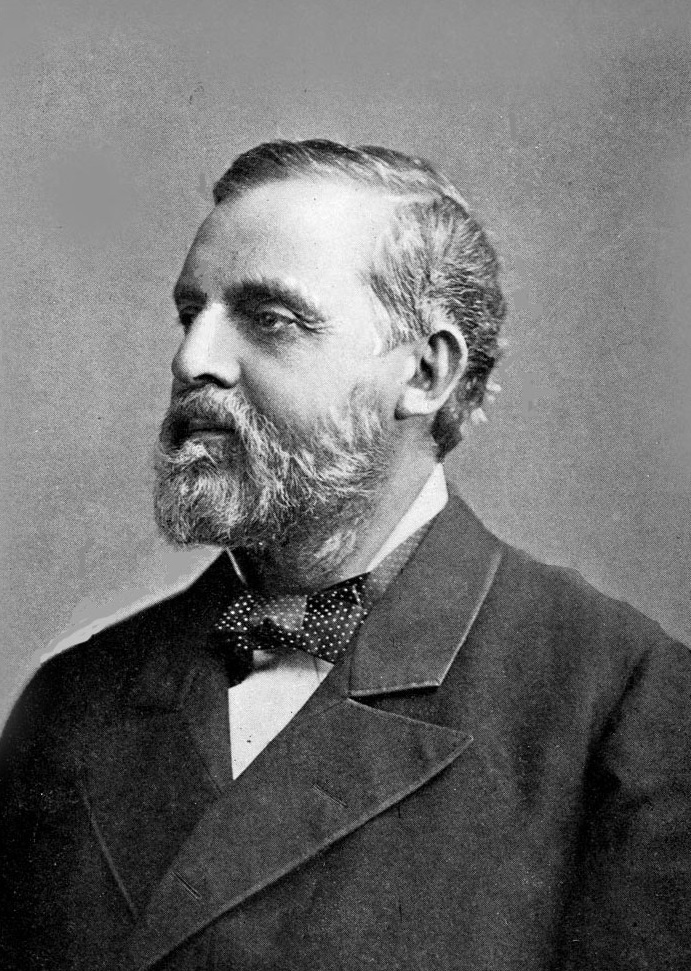
Horatio J. Perry

After taking a vow of abstinence after the death of Alberto Tejada at sea (whether he was real or imaginary), she revoked the vow when she married Horatio Justus Perry in Madrid in 1852. (Note: Horatio Justus Perry (1824–1891) born 23 Jan 1824, in Keene, Cheshire, NH, United States of America son of Justus Perry and Mary Haven née Edwards brother of Mary Olivia Perry (1826) and half-brother of Ellen Elizabeth Perry (1828), Martha Ann Perry (1830) and Henry Perry (1832) died 1891 in Lisbon, Portugal "New Hampshire Births and Christenings, 1714-1904," database, FamilySearch (https://familysearch.org/ark:/61903/1:1:FDJ6-CS7 : 12 December 2014), Justus Perry in entry for Horatio Justus Perry, 23 Jan 1824; citing KEENE TWP, CHESHIRE, NEW HAMPSHIRE; FHL microfilm 1,001,031.) Perry was the secretary of the Embassy of the United States. They had one son – Carlos Horacio (1853–1854) and two daughters – Carolina (1857–1873) and Matilde (b 1861) who married Pedro Torres Cabrera, connected to the count of Canilleros. At a time when women were not invited to public political conversations, Coronado succeeded in persuasively arguing against Spain's imperial legacy and urging support to rectify her nation's past colonial blunders, especially the introduction of slavery to the Americas.

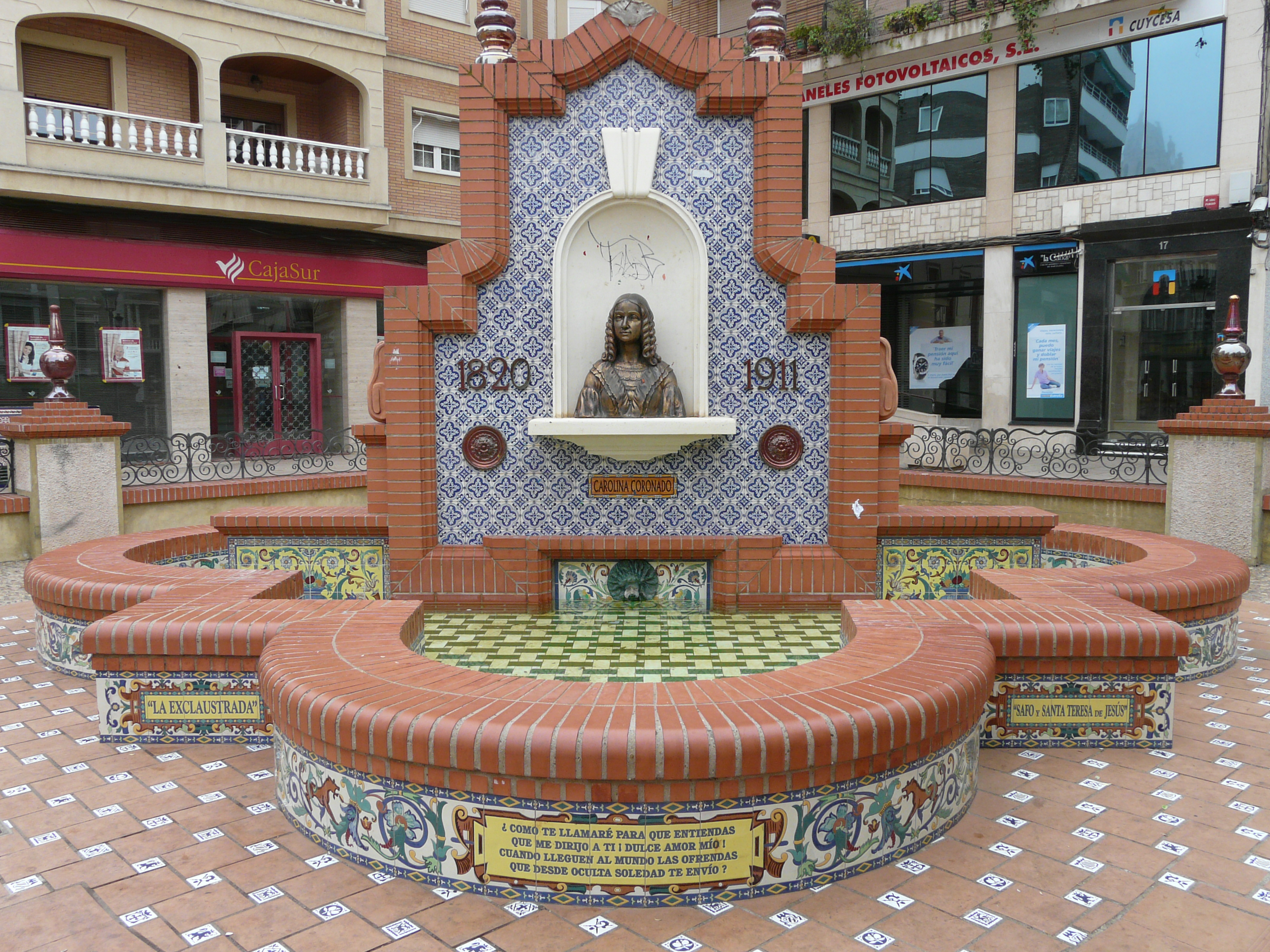
Monument to Coronado in Almendralejo

Coronado had a revolutionary spirit, and she became famous while living in Madrid for the literary salons she held, a group that was called the Hermandad Lírica (Lyrical Sisterhood). Her gatherings served as a meeting-point for progressive writers and a refuge for the persecuted, including many of the most well-known authors of the time. Unfortunately for her, her clandestine refuge and affinity for revolution brought about the disapproval of her contemporaries.

Despite this, she succeeded in publishing several works in newspapers and magazines and thus gained a certain measure of fame. Her physical beauty undoubtedly contributed to her success, and it caused infamous admiration in other romantic writers, including poet José de Espronceda.

Coronado died in Lisbon, Portugal on 15 January 1911.

== Work ==
The main body of Coronado's work was lyric poetry. Her poems adopted diverse themes, including patriotic sentiment in ¡Oh, mi España!; religion in El amor de los amores and ¿Cómo, Señor, no he de tenerte miedo?; and especially Romanticism in poems such as A una gota de rocío, A la rosa blanca, Nada resta de tí, ¡Oh! cuál te adoro, A una estrella, and A las nubes. An important theme in her work is her feminism and her strong denunciations of social injustices and violence towards women. Her prolific works were compiled in a single volume entitled Poesías, published in 1843 and re-edited in 1852, that includes a prologue by Juan Eugenio Hartzenbusch.

In prose, she wrote a total of fifteen novels including Luz, El bonete de San Ramón, La Siega, Jarrilla, La rueda de la desgracia (1873), and Paquita (1850). Many critics consider the last to be the best. She also authored several plays like El cuadro de la esperanza (1846), Alfonso IV de León, Un alcalde de monterilla, and El divino Figueroa, but these endeavors are considered minor in comparison to her non-theatrical works.
