= Premio Adonáis de Poesía =

Prize for poetry awarded annually in Spain

The Premio Adonáis, or Adonais Prize for Poetry, is awarded annually in Spain by Ediciones RIALP to an unpublished Spanish language poem. Runners-up are also recognized.

Named after the collection of the same name, the Adonais Prize was created in 1943 (a year before the Premio Nadal) by the publishing house Biblioteca Hispánica, which was then directed by Juan Gerrero Ruiz, best friend of Juan Ramón Jiménez. In 1946, the Prize was placed in the hands of Ediciones RIALP, which has maintained it to this day.

In its first few years, the Prize contributed to the rise of major poets of the Spanish postwar period. The Adonais is similar to the Premio Hiperión, which also promotes young authors.

The prize is awarded in December of each year.

== List of winning authors and books ==
- 1943. José Suárez Carreño (Spain), Edad del hombre; Vicente Gaos (Spain), Arcángel de mi noche; Alfonso Moreno Redondo,(Spain), El vuelo de la carne.
- 1944. Not awarded.
- 1945. Not awarded.
- 1946. Not awarded.
- 1947. José Hierro (Spain), Alegría.

Runners-up: Concha Zardoya (Chile-Spain), Dominio del llanto; Eugenio de Nora (Spain), Contemplación del tiempo; Julio Mauri (Spain), Los años.

- 1948. Not awarded.
- 1949. Ricardo Molina (Spain), Corimbo.

Runners-up: Juan Ruiz Peña (Spain), Vida del poeta; Ramón de Garcisol (Spain), Defensa del hombre.

- 1950. José García Nieto (Spain), Dama de soledad.

Runners-up: Javier de Bengoechea (Spain), Habitada claridad; Carlos Salomón (Spain), La sed.

- 1951. Lorenzo Gomis (Spain), El caballo.

Runners-up: José Manuel Caballero Bonald (Spain), Las adivinaciones; Alfonso Albalá (Spain), Umbral de armonía; Julián Andúgar (Spain), La soledad y el encuentro; Luis López Anglada (Spain), La vida conquistada.

- 1952. Antonio Fernández Spencer (Dominican Republic), Bajo la luz del día.

Runners-up: Salvador Pérez Valiente (Spain), Por tercera vez; Susana March (Spain), La tristeza; Jaime Ferrán (Spain), Desde esta orilla; Jesús López Pacheco (Spain), Dejad crecer este silencio.

- 1953. Claudio Rodríguez (Spain), Don de la ebriedad.

Runners-up: Pino Ojeda (Spain), Como el fruto en el árbol; Pilar Paz Pasamar (Spain), Los buenos días.

- 1954. José Ángel Valente (Spain), A modo de esperanza.

Runners-up: Carlos Murciano (Spain), Viento en la carne; José Agustín Goytisolo (Spain), El retorno.

- 1955. Javier de Bengoechea (Spain), Hombre en forma de elegía.

Runners-up: Maria Beneyto (Spain), Tierra viva; Ángel González (Spain), Áspero mundo.

- 1956. María Elvira Lacaci (Spain), Humana voz.

Runners-up: Salustiano Masó (Spain), Contemplación y aventura; Fernando Quiñones (Spain), Cercanía de la gracia.

- 1957. Carlos Sahagún (Spain), Profecías del agua.

Runners-up: Joaquín Fernández (Spain), Sin vuelta de hoja; Eladio Cabañero (Spain), Una señal de amor.

- 1958. Rafael Soto Verges (Spain), La agorera.

Runners-up: Enrique Molina Campos (Spain), La puerta; Antonio Murciano (Spain), La semilla.

- 1959. Francisco Brines (Spain), Las brasas.

Runners-up: Luis Martínez Drake (Spain), La yerba; Antonio Gala (Spain), Enemigo íntimo.

- 1960. Mariano Roldán (Spain), Hombre nuevo.

Runners-up: Salustiano Masó (Spain), Historia de un tiempo futuro; Ernesto Contreras (Spain), Interior con figuras.

- 1961. Luis Feria (Spain), Conciencia.

Runners-up: Juan Antonio Castro (Spain), Tiempo amarillo; Julia Uceda (Spain), Extraña juventud.

- 1962. Jesús Hilario Tundidor (Spain), Junto a mi silencio.

Runners-up: Ricardo Defarges (Spain), El arbusto; Manuel Padorno (Spain), A la sombra del mar.

- 1963. Félix Grande (Spain), Las piedras.

Runners-up: Manuel Álvarez Ortega (Spain), Invención de la muerte; Elena Andrés (Spain), Dos caminos.

- 1964. Diego Jesús Jiménez (Spain), La ciudad.

Runners-up: César Aller (Spain), Libro de elegías; Antonio Hernández (Spain), El mar es una tarde con campanas.

- 1965. Joaquín Caro Romero (Spain), El tiempo en el espejo.

Runners-up: Vicente García Hernández (Spain), Los pájaros; Francisco Carrasco Heredia (Spain), Las raíces.

- 1966. Miguel Fernández (Spain), Sagrada materia.

Runners-up: Juan Van-Halen (Spain), La frontera; José Roberto Cea (Spain), Códice liberado.

- 1967. Joaquín Benito de Lucas (Spain), Materia de olvido.

Runners-up: Angel García López (Spain), Tierra de nadie; Antonio López Luna (Spain), Memoria de la muerte; Marcos Ricardo Barnatán (Argentina-Spain), Los pasos perdidos.

- 1968. Roberto Sosa (Honduras), Los pobres.

Runners-up: Eugenio Padorno (Spain), Metamorfosis; Antonio Colinas (Spain), Preludios a una noche total.

- 1969. Angel García López (Spain), A flor de piel.

Runners-up: Manuel Ríos Ruiz (Spain), Amores con la tierra; Pablo Armando Fernández (Spain), Un sitio permanente.

- 1970. Pureza Canelo (Spain), Lugar común.

Runners-up: Paloma Palao (Spain), El gato junto al agua; Justo Jorge Padrón (Spain), Los oscuros fuegos; José Luis Núñez (Spain), Los motivos del tigre.

- 1971. José Infante (Spain), Elegía y no.

Runners-up: Rafael Talavera (Spain), Tres poemas y calcomanías; José María Bermejo (Spain), Epidemia de nieve.

- 1972. José Luis Alegre Cudos (Spain), Abstracción de Mío Cid con Cid Mío.

Runners-up: José María Prieto (Spain), Círculo ciego; Enrike Gracia (Spain), Encuentros.

- 1973. José Antonio Moreno Jurado (Spain), Ditirambos para mi propia burla.

Runners-up: Antonio Quintana (Spain), El ojo único del unicornio; Antonio Domínguez Rey (Spain), Garlopa marina.

- 1974. Julia Castillo (Spain), Urgencias de un río interior.

Runners-up: Francisco García Marquina (Spain), Liber usualis officii et orationum; Emilio Sola (Spain), La isla.

- 1975. Angel Sánchez Pascual (Spain), Ceremonia de la inocencia.

Runners-up: Alfredo J. Ramos Campos (Spain), Esquinas del destierro; Antolín Iglesias Páramo (Spain), Afueras del Edén.

- 1976. Jorge G. Aranguren (Spain), De fuegos, tigres, ríos.

Runners-up: Carmelo Guillén Acosta (Spain), Envés del existir; Pedro Vergés (Spain), Durante los inviernos.

- 1977. Eloy Sánchez Rosillo (Spain), Maneras de estar solo.

Runners-up: Luis de Paola (Spain), Música para películas mudas; María Rosa Vicente (Spain), Canto de la distancia.

- 1978. Arcadio López-Casanova (Spain), La oscura potestad.

Runners-up: Ana María Navales (Spain), Mester de amor; Carlos Clementson (Spain), De la tierra, del mar y otros caminos.

- 1979. Laureano Albán (Costa Rica), Herencia del otoño.

Runners-up: Rosa María Echevarría (Spain), Arquíloco o nuestra propia voz; Pedro J. de la Peña (Spain), Teatro del sueño; Miguel Velasco (Spain), Sobre el silencio y otros llantos.

- 1980. Blanca Andreu (Spain), De una niña de provincias que vino a vivir en un Chagall.

Runners-up: Salvador García Jiménez (Spain), Epica de náufrago; José María Parreño (Spain), Instrucciones para blindar un corazón.

- 1981. Miguel Velasco (Spain), Las berlinas del sueño.

Runners-up: Julieta Dobles (Spain), Hora de lejanías; Rafael Duarte (Spain), Los viejos mitos del asombro.

- 1982. Luis García Montero (Spain), El jardín extranjero.

Runners-up: Fernando Beltrán (Spain), Aquelarre en Madrid; Amparo Amorós (Spain), Ludia.

- 1983. Javier Peñas Navarro, Adjetivos sin agua, adjetivos con agua.

Runners-up: Carmen Pallarés (Spain), La llave del grafito; Basilio Sánchez (Spain), A este lado del alba.

- 1984. Amalia Iglesias Serna (Spain), Un lugar para el fuego.

Runners-up: José Luis V. Ferris (Spain), Centro de cal; Antonio del Camino (Spain), Del verbo y la penumbra.

- 1985. Juan Carlos Mestre (Spain), Antífona de otoño en el valle del Bierzo.

Runners-up: María del Mar Alférez (Spain), Criptoepístola de azares; Federico Gallego Ripoll (Spain), Crimen pasional en la Plaza Roja.

- 1986. Juan María Calles (Spain), Silencio celeste.

Runners-up: José Luis Puerto (Spain), Un jardín al olvido; Pedro González Moreno (Spain), Pentagrama para escribir silencios.

- 1987. Francisco Serradilla (Spain), El bosque insobornable.

Runners-up: Rosana Acquaroni (Spain), Del mar bajo los puentes; Mª Luisa Mora Alameda (Spain), Este largo viaje hacia la lluvia; Carmina Casala (Spain), Lava de labios.

- 1988. Miguel Sánchez Gatell, La soledad absoluta de la tierra.

Runners-up: José Luis Díaz (Spain), Los pasos de la ceniza; Alberto Martín Méndez (Spain), Biografía de un traficante de no sé.

- 1989. Juan Carlos Marset (Spain), Puer profeta.

Runners-up: Aurora Luque (Spain), Problemas de doblaje; Francisco M. Monterde (Spain), Penúltima lectura del silencio.

- 1990. Diego Doncel (Spain), El único umbral.

Runners-up: Fermín Gámez (Spain), Efecto invernadero; José María Muñoz Quirós (Spain), Ritual de los espejos.

- 1991. Jesús Javier Lázaro Puebla (Spain), Canción para una amazona dormida.

Runners-up: Mar García Lozano (Spain), Los mercaderes; Miguel Argaya (Spain), Geometría de las cosas irregulares.

- 1992. Juan Antonio Marín Alba (Spain), El horizonte de la noche.

Runners-up: Aurelio González Ovies (Spain), Vengo del Norte; Enrique Ortiz Sierra (Spain), Extraño abordaje.

- 1993. María Luisa Mora Alameda (Spain), Busca y captura.

Runners-up: Berta Serra Manzanares (Spain), Frente al Mar de 1994 in poetry|Citerea; Enrique Falcón (Spain), La marcha de 150.000.000.

- 1994. Ana Merino (Spain), Preparativos para un viaje.

Runners-up: Juan Fco. Lorenzo (Spain), Menú de día; Jesús Losada (Spain), Huerto cerrado del amor.

- 1995. Eduardo Moga (Spain), La luz oída.

Runners-up: Beatriz Hernanz (Spain), La vigilia del tiempo; Antonio Lucas (Spain), Antes del mundo.

- 1996. Rosario Neira (Spain), No somos ángeles.

Runners-up: Angel Luján (Spain), Días débiles; José Luis Rey (Spain), Un evangelio español.

- 1997. Luis Martínez-Falero (Spain), Plenitud de la materia.

Runners-up: Fermin Gámez (Spain), Arcana certidumbre; May Judith Serrano (Spain), Huerto cerrado del amor; Pedro J. Alonso (Spain), Sólo la ausencia.

- 1998. Luis Enrique Belmonte (Venezuela), Inútil registro.

Runners-up: José Luis López Bretones (Spain), El lugar de un extraño; Raul Borrás (Spain), Diluvio en la mirada.

- 1999. Irene Sánchez Carrón (Spain), Escenas principales de actor secundario.

Runners-up: Laura Moll (Spain), Océano y otros poemas; Álvaro Fierro (Spain), Tan callando.

- 2000. Joaquín Pérez Azaústre (Spain), Una interpretación (64 pages, ISBN 84-321-3332-9).

Runners-up: Miguel Ángel Curiel (Spain), El verano; Catalina Morato (Spain), El huso y la palabra; Juan Carlos Abril (Spain), El laberinto azul.

- 2001. José Antonio Gómez-Coronado (Spain), El triunfo de los días.

Runners-up: Javier Cano (Spain), Lugares para un exilio; Rafael Antúnez Arce (Spain), Nada que decir.

- 2002. Adrián González da Costa (Spain), Rua dos douradores.

Runners-up: Modesto Calderón (Spain), Venenos de la rosa; José Luis Gómez Toré (Spain), He heredado la noche.

- 2003. Javier Vela (Spain), La hora del crepúsculo.

Runners-up: Antonio Aguilar (Spain), Allí donde no estuve; Ana Isabel Conejo (Spain), Vidrios, vasos, luz, tardes.

- 2004. José Martínez Ros (Spain), La enfermedad.

Runners-up: Jesús Beades (Spain), La ciudad dormida; Paolo Álvarez Correyero (Spain), Hoy cumplo 16.

- 2005. Carlos Vaquerizo (Spain), Fiera venganza del tiempo.

Runners-up: Raquel Lanseros (Spain), Diario de un destello; Juan Meseguer (Spain) Bancos de arena.

- 2006. Jorge Galán, pseudonym of George Alexander Portillo (El Salvador), Breve historia del Alba.

Runners-up: Francisco Onieva (Spain), Perímetros de la tarde; Antonio Praena (Spain), Poemas para mi hermana.

- 2007. Teresa Soto González (Spain), Un poemario (Imitación de Wislawa).

Runners-up: Diego Vaya (Spain), El libro del viento; Pablo Moreno Prieto (Spain), Discurso de la ceniza.

- 2008: Rogelio Guedea (Mexico), Kora.

Runners-up: María Eugenia Reyes Lindo (Spain), El fabricante de ruinas; Alfredo Juan Félix-Díaz (Mexico), Si resistimos.

- 2009: Rubén Martín Díaz (Spain), El minuto interior.

Runners-up: Verónica Aranda, Cortes de luz; Daniel Casado, Oscuro pez del fondo; Mario Lourtau, Quince días de fuego.

- 2010: José Gutiérrez Román (Spain), Los pies del horizonte.

Runners-up: Francisco Javier Burguillo López, Musa de fuego; Alberto Chessa, La osamenta.

- 2011: Jesús Bernal (Spain), Hombre en la niebla.

Runners-up: Vanesa Pérez-Sauquillo, Climax road; Ruth Miguel Franco, La muerte y los hermanos.

- 2012: Martha Asunción Alonso (Spain), La soledad criolla.

Runners-up: Rocío Arana Caballero, La llave dorada; Ángel Talián, La vida panorámica.

- 2013: Joaquín Moreno Pedrosa (Spain), Largo viaje.

Runners-up: Lutgardo García Díaz, La viña perdida; Juan Meseguer, Áspera nada.

- 2014: Constantino Molina Monteagudo (Spain), Las ramas del azar

Runners-up: José Antonio Pérez-Robleda, Mitología intima; Nilton Santiago, A otro perro con este hueso.

- 2015: Rodrigo Sancho Ferrer (Spain), Vaho.

Runners-up: Magdalena Camargo Lemieszek (Panama), La doncella sin manos; Nelo Curti (Uruguay), El lujo de ponernos tristes.

- 2016: Sergio Navarro Ramírez (Spain), La lucha por el vuelo.

Runners-up: Bibiana Collado El recelo del agua; Camino Román. Accidente

- 2017: Alba Flores Robla (Spain), Digan adiós a la muchacha.

Runners-up: Álvaro Petit Que aún me duelas; Pablo Fidalgo. Crónica de las aves de paso.

- 2018: Marcela Duque(Colombia), Bello es el riesgo.

Runners-up: José Alcaraz, El mar en las cenizas; Guillermo Marco Remón, Otras nubes.

- 2019: María Elena Higueruelo (Spain), Los días eternos.

Runners-up: Diego Medina Póveda, Todo cuanto es verdad; Felicitas Castillo, El contorno del roble.

- 2020: Abraham Guerrero Tenorio (Spain), Toda violencia.

Runners-up: Marta Jiménez Serrano, La edad ligera; Rodrigo Olay, Vieja escuela; Ignacio Pérez Cerón, Márgenes de error.

- 2021: Nuria Ortega Riba (Spain), Las infancias sonoras.

Runners-up: Andrés María García Cuevas, Las ciudades; Félix Moyano Casiano, La deuda prometida.
