= Luis García Montero =

Spanish poet and literary critic

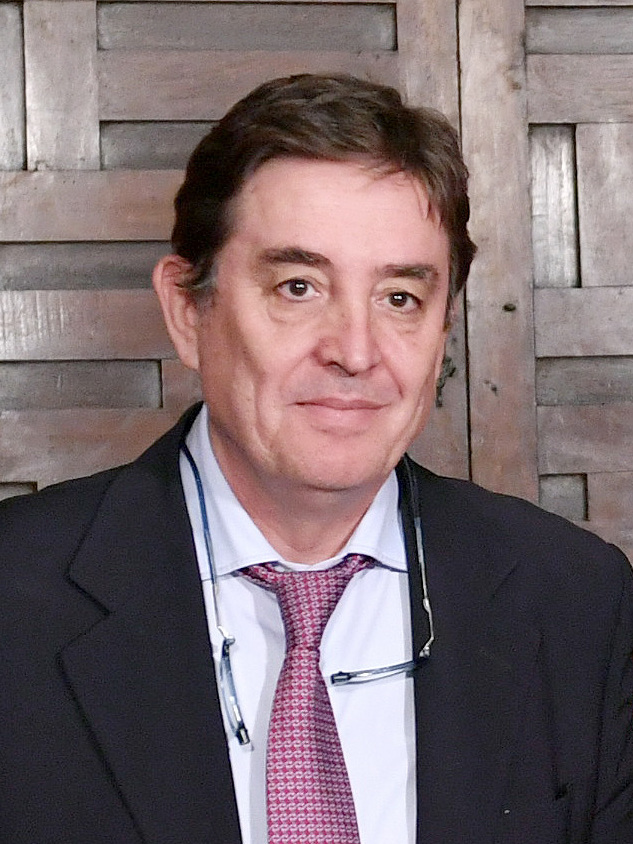
- Luis García Montero in 2019

Director of Instituto Cervantes
- Incumbent
- Assumed office 2018
- Preceded by: Juan Manuel Bonet

Personal details
- Born: Granada, Andalusia, Spain
- Spouse: Almudena Grandes (m. 1994; died 2021)
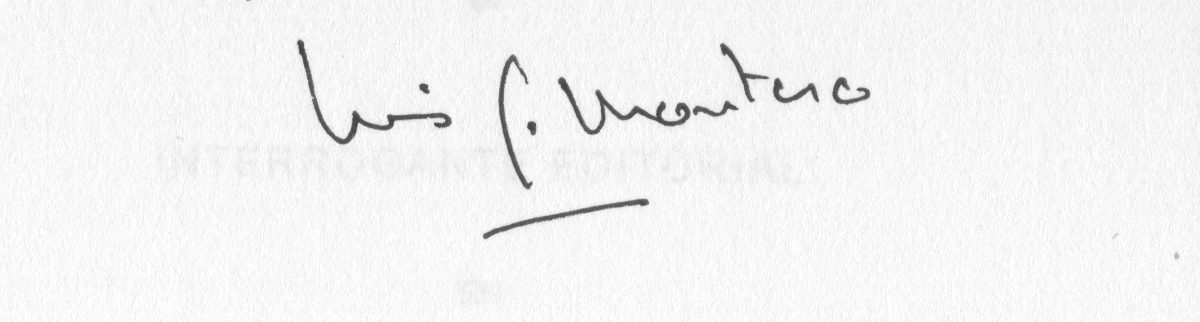
- Signature
- Website: luisgarciamontero.com

Luis García Montero is a Spanish poet, literary critic and academic. He is a professor of Spanish Literature at the University of Granada and since 2018 director of the Instituto Cervantes.

== Early life and education ==
Descended from a granadina family that was very active in the community, Luis García Montero was born in Granada, the son of Luis García López and Elisa Montero Peña.

He studied at the Colegio Dulce Nombre de María - PP.Escolapios in Granada. As a teenager, he met Spanish poet Blas de Otero. He was a fan of equestrian sports.

García Montero studied philosophy and literature at the University of Granada, where he was a student of Juan Carlos Rodríguez Gómez, a social literature theorist. He received his masters in 1980 and a doctorate in 1985, with a thesis about Rafael Alberti, "La norma y los estilos en la poesía de Rafael Alberti" ("The norm and styles of Rafael Alberti's poetry"). He maintained a great friendship with Alberti, a poet of the Generation of '27, and prepared a compilation of all his works of poetry.

== Career ==
García Montero began to work as an associate professor at the University of Granada in 1981. He received the Premio Adonáis de Poesía in 1982 for El jardín extranjero. He created a memoir of his studies in 1984, El teatro medieval. Polémica de una inexistencia (Medieval theatre. Controversy of an inexistence).

He became linked to the poetic group La Otra Setimentalidad ("The Other Sentimentality"). The group's first book of contemporary Spanish poetry, published in 1983, used this name. Poets Javier Egea and Álvaro Salvador were also members. The poetics of the group was reflected in this short book, and in lesser part in the manifesto Manifiesto albertista (1982) by García Montero and Egea. Their personal trajectory began widening in what would later become known as poesía de la experiencia ("poetry of experience") and is characterized by the general tendency to dillude the most personal I in the collective experience, furthering itself from the stylistic and thematic individuality of previous Novísimos authors. García Montero and his group, however, tried to relate themselves with the previous poetic tradition taking in the postulates Luis Cernuda and Jaime Gil de Biedma and tried to unite the aesthetics of Antonio Machado with the thinking of the Generation of the '50s, as well as with Surrealism and the impactful images of Spanish Baroque poets or those of Juan Ramón Jiménez.

García Montero's most distinguishable characteristic is the history-biographical narrativism of his poems; a structure almost theatrical or novelistic, with a character or protagonist that tells or lives his story through recollection, memory or desire. His poetry is characterized by a colloquial language and by his reflections regarding everyday events or situations.

He has edited Rimas (Rhymes) by Gustavo Adolfo Bécquer, among other theoretical works. He has also cultivated the art of essay writing and is an opinion columnist. Between the award-winning poetics that he's received, the most impressive have been the Premio Federico García Lorca, the Premio Loewe, the Premio Adonáis of poetry and the National Poetry Award – which he was presented with in 1995 – and the Premio Nacional de la Crítica in 2003. In 2010 he was awarded in Mexico the Premio Poetas del Mundo Latino for his literary career.

== Political activities ==
From a young age he was an active member in the Communist Party of Spain and, since its foundation in 1986, in the United Left. In the 2004 European Parliament election he was a United Left candidate. Prior to the 2011 Spanish general election he declared his support for United Left.

In October 2012 it was announced that he would take on a key role in Izquierda Abierta, a new party led by Gaspar Llamazares and Montse Muñoz that was part of the United Left coalition.

García Montero stood in the 2015 regional election in the Community of Madrid. He was first in the list of United Left of the Community of Madrid/The Greens, but he failed to obtain a seat as the group did not reach the required 5% threshold.

== Awards ==
- Premio Adonáis de Poesía, for El jardín extranjero (1982)
- Premio Loewe, for Habitaciones separadas (1994)
- National Poetry Award (Spain), for Habitaciones separadas (1995)
- Premio Nacional de la Crítica (Spain), for La intimidad de la serpiente (2003)
- Premio Poetas Mundo del Latino (Mexico), for his career (2010)
- Carlos Fuentes Prize (México), for his life's work (2024)

== Personal life ==
From 1994, until her death from cancer in 2021, García Montero was married to the writer Almudena Grandes.

== Controversies ==
On 22 October 2008 García Montero was condemned for an injuries case against José Antonio Fortes, professor at the University of Granada. The poet in an article published in El País called Fortes "disturbing" for claiming that Lorcan poetry had been served as an ideological breeding ground for fascist poetry. In other writings, Fortes had attacked Francisco Ayala, Antonio Muñoz Molina, Joaquín Sabina, Gustavo Adolfo Bécquer and Rafael Alberti, as fascist writers or capitalism sellers. Judge Miguel Ángel Torres sentenced García Montero to pay a fine of €1,800 as well as another €3,000 to Fortes for serious publicity injuries. The poet referred to Fortes as an "indecent fool", and "disturbed", and in a meeting with other members of the department he referred to him by derogatory names. Although he thanked the many institutional and personal solidarity displays, García Montero announced a short time afterward a request for a leave of absence from the lecturer post that he had at the University of Granada, which he entered as a professor in 1981. He left a year later because he said he found the university department environment "unbreathable".

Another controversy, about the Ciudad de Burgos Poetry Prize (2012), was reported in several Spanish newspapers.

There has been conflict between the Instituto Cervantes and the Royal Spanish Academy, although both institutions are funded by the state and share a responsibility for promoting the Spanish language. The director of the Academy, Santiago Muñoz Machado, has criticised the Instituto.

== Selected works ==
=== Poetry ===
- Y ahora ya eres dueño del Puente de Brooklyn, Granada, University (Zumaya collection), 1980, Premio Federico García Lorca.
- Tristia, in collaboration with Álvaro Salvador, Melilla, Rusadir, 1982.
- El jardín extranjero, Madrid, Rialp, (Premio Adonáis), 1983 (... Poemas de Tristia, Madrid, Hiperión, 1989).
- Rimado de ciudad, Granada town hall, 1983.
- Égloga de dos rascacielos, Granada, Romper el Cerco, 1984 (2ª ed. Madrid, Hiperión, 1989).
- En pie de paz, Granada, Editions of the Committee of Solitarity with Central America, 1985.
- Seis poemas del mar (autógrafos), [Riotinto?], Pliegos de Mineral, 1985.
- Diario cómplice, Madrid, Hiperión, 1987.
- Anuncios por palabras, Málaga, Plaza de la Marina, 1988.
- Secreto de amistad, Málaga, I. B. Sierra Bermeja, 1990.
- Las flores del frío, Madrid, Hiperión, 1990.
- En otra edad, Málaga, Librería Anticuaria El Guadalhorce, 1992.
- Fotografías veladas de la lluvia, Valladolid, El Gato Gris, 1993.
- Habitaciones separadas, Madrid, Visor, 1994: (Premio Loewe y Premio Nacional de Literatura)
- Además, Madrid, Hiperión, 1994.
- Quedarse sin ciudad, Palma de Mallorca, Monograma, 1994.
- Casi cien poemas (1980-1996): antología, prologue by José Carlos Mainer, Madrid, Hiperión, 1997.
- Completamente viernes, Barcelona, Tusquets, 1998.
- Antología personal, Madrid, Visor, 2001.
- Poemas, Santander, Ultramar, 2001.
- Antología poética, Madrid, Castalia, 2002.
- Poesía urbana (antología 1980-2002); study and selections by Laura Scarano, Sevilla, Renacimiento, 2002.
- La intimidad de la serpiente, Barcelona, Tusquets, 2003, Premio Nacional de la Crítica 2003.
- Poesía (1980-2005); ocho libros ordenados y reunidos, Barcelona, Tusquets, 2006.
- Infancia; Málaga, Castilian collection from English, 2006.
- Vista cansada, Madrid, Visor, 2008
- Canciones, edition by Juan Carlos Abril, Valencia, Pre-Textos, 2009
- Un invierno propio, Madrid, Visor, 2011
- Ropa de calle, Madrid, Cátedra, 2011

=== Essays and article collections ===
- La otra sentimentalidad, together with Javier Egea and Álvaro Salvador, Granada, Don Quijote, 1983.
- La norma y los estilos en la poesía de Rafael Alberti (1920-1939), Granada, Servicio de Publicaciones, Universidad de Granada, 1986.
- Poesía, cuartel de invierno, Madrid Hiperión, 1988 (2nd ed. Barcelona, Seix-Barral, 2002).
- Confesiones poéticas, Granada, Diputación Provincial, 1993.
- La palabra de Ícaro (literary studies about García Lorca and Alberti), Granada, Servicio de Publicaciones de la Universidad de Granada, 1996.
- Lecciones de poesía para niños inquietos (Illustrations by Juan Vida), Granada, Editorial Comares, 1999: The book is aimed directly toward young readers and intends to show them what poetry consists of.
- El sexto día : historia íntima de la poesía española, Madrid, Debate, 2000.
- Gigante y extraño : las "Rimas" de Gustavo Adolfo Bécquer, Barcelona, Tusquets, 2001.
- Los dueños del vacío. La conciencia poética, entre la identidad y los vínculos, Barcelona, Tusquets, 2006.
- Inquietudes bárbaras, Barcelona, Anagrama, 2008.

=== Novels ===
- In 2009 he published his first novel, Mañana no será lo que Dios quiera, about the life of the poet Ángel González, who died in 2008. For this book he received the Premio del Gremio de Libreros al Mejor libro of 2009.
- In 2012 he published his second novel No me cuentes tu vida (Don't tell me your life), in which he reflects throughout three generations about the recent history of Spain.

=== Other books ===
He also published a book of narrative mistakes about his infancy (Luna del sur, Sevilla: Renacimiento, 1992), a novel together with Felipe Benítez Reyes (Impares, fila 13, Barcelona: Planeta, 1996) and the children's book La mudanza de Adán (Adam's moving) (Madrid: Anaya, 2002). His short story Dedicatoria was included in the book. (Logroño: Editorial Buscarini, 2008).

- El romántico ilustrado. Images by Luis García Montero, Juan Carlos Abril and Xelo Candel Vila Edition, Sevilla, Renacimiento, 2009.
