= José Pérez Olivares =

- Born: 1949 (age 76–77); Santiago de Cuba, Cuba
- Occupations: Poet, painter, teacher of visual arts
- Known for: Poetry, painting
- Notable work: A la mano zurda
- Awards: IV Premio Iberoamericano de Poesía Hermanos Machado (2014)

José Pérez Olivares (born 1949 in Santiago de Cuba) is a Cuban-born poet, painter, and teacher of visual arts. He has published multiple poetry collections and received several literary awards. In 2014, he won the IV Ibero-American Poetry Prize Hermanos Machado for his book A la mano zurda.

== Biography ==
Pérez Olivares was born in Santiago de Cuba in 1949. He studied plastic arts at the Instituto Superior de Arte in Havana. He later taught visual arts in several institutions in Cuba and Colombia. By 2014, he was living in Seville, Spain.

== Career ==
Pérez Olivares has combined careers in poetry and painting. His published poetry collections include A imagen y semejanza (1987), Caja de Pandora (1987), Examen del guerrero (1992), Cristo entrando en Bruselas (1994), Háblame de las ciudades perdidas (1999), El rostro y la máscara (2000), Últimos instantes de la víctima (2001), and Los poemas del Rey David (2008).

His manuscript A la mano zurda was awarded the IV Premio Iberoamericano de Poesía Hermanos Machado in 2014. The jury described the work as distinguished by a strong poetic personality and themes exploring artistic reflection and metaphysical concerns.

== Awards ==
- IV Premio Iberoamericano de Poesía Hermanos Machado (2014).
- Additional awards mentioned in coverage include the Jaime Gil de Biedma Prize (1991), the Rafael Alberti Poetry Prize (1993), and the Renacimiento Poetry Prize (1998).
