= Aurelio González =

Aurelio González or Gonzales is the name of:

- Aurelio González (boxer) (born 1939), Argentine boxer
- Aurelio González (footballer) (1905–1997), Paraguayan football player
- Aurelio Gonzales Jr. (born 1964), Filipino politician
- Aurelio González Puente (born 1940), Spanish road racing cyclist
- Aurelio González Ovies (born 1964), Spanish writer and poet
- Aurelio Gonzales-Vigil (born 1996), Peruvian footballer
- Aurelio L. González (1860–1927), Mexican politician, governor of Aguascalientes in 1917–1920
