= José Manuel Caballero Bonald =

Spanish novelist, lecturer, and poet (1926–2021)

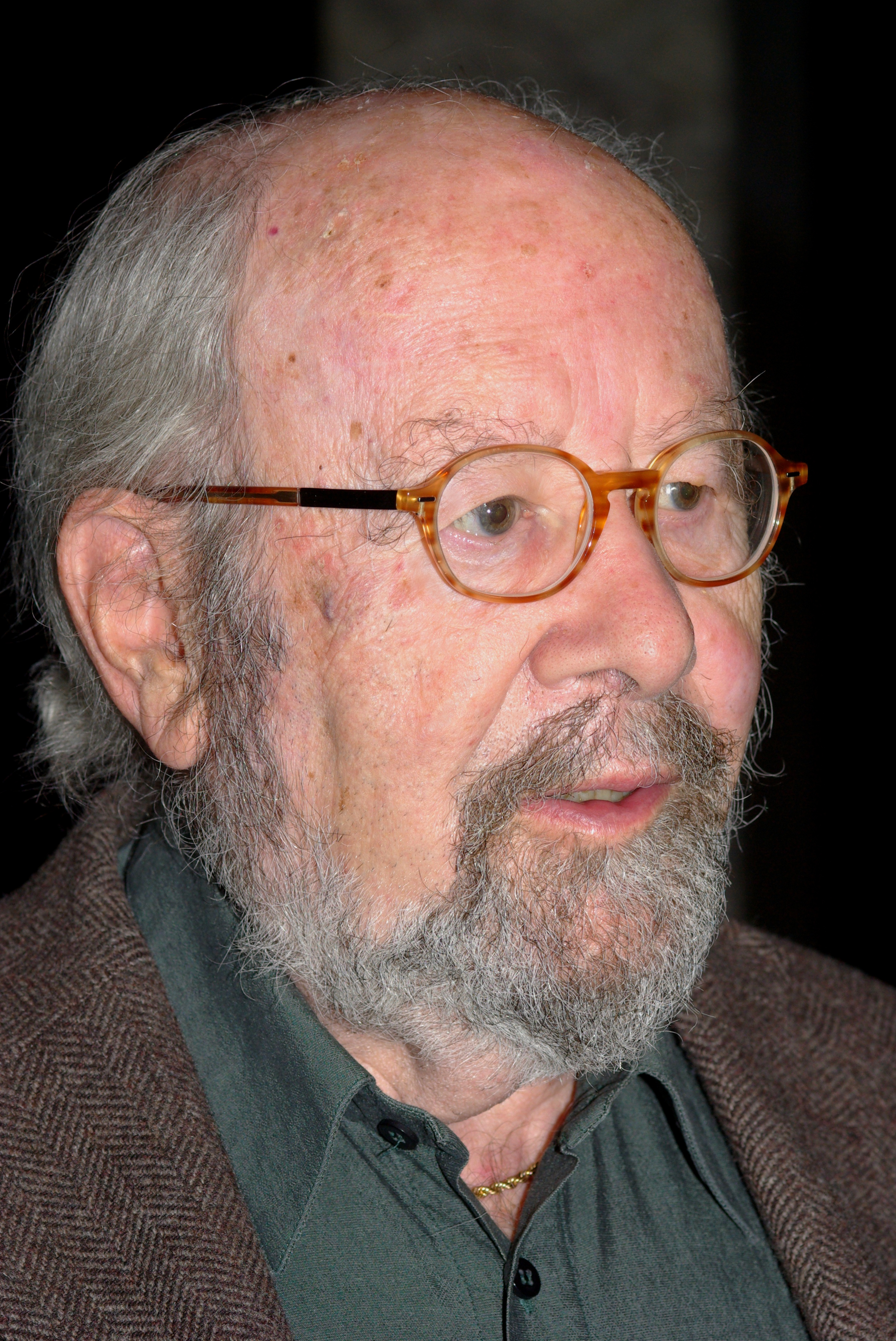
- Caballero Bonald in 2012
- Born: November 11, 1926; Calle Caballeros, Jerez de la Frontera, Spain
- Died: May 9, 2021 (aged 94); Madrid, Spain
- Education: Marianistas de Jerez School
- Occupations: Novelist, lecturer and poet
- Relatives: Plácido Caballero, Julia Bonald
- Writing career
- Notable work: Narrativa Cubana de la Revolución
- Notable awards: Favourite Son of Andalucía
- Literary movement: Generation of 1950

José Manuel Caballero Bonald (November 11, 1926 – May 9, 2021) was a Spanish novelist, lecturer and poet.

== Early life ==
Caballero was born in Calle Caballeros, Jerez de la Frontera, Spain. His father was Plácido Caballero, a Cuban whose mother was of European descent and whose father was from Cantabria. His mother was Julia Bonald, a descendant of Viscount Louis Gabriel Ambroise de Bonald, a traditional French philosopher who settled in Andalucia in the middle of the 19th century.

== Education ==
Between 1936 and 1943, Caballero Bonald studied at the Marianistas de Jerez School. During the Spanish Civil War, he spent some time in the Sierra de Cádiz and in Sanlúcar de Barrameda. He read the first books that were to influence him: Jack London, Emilio Salgari, Robert Louis Stevenson, and José de Espronceda.

Between 1944 and 1948, he undertook nautical studies in Cádiz, and he wrote his first poems. He made friends with members of the Cádiz magazine Platero, namely Fernando Quiñones, Pilar Paz Pasamar, Felipe Sordo Lamadrid, Serafín Pro Hesles, Julio Mariscal, José Luis Tejada, Francisco Pleguezuelo and Pedro Ardoy.

Caballero Bonald spent his military service in the Milicia Naval Universitaria and spent two summers sailing in the waters of the Canary Islands, Morocco and Galicia. His military career was curtailed when he contracted a lung illness and travelled to Jerez to recuperate.

Between 1949 and 1952, he studied philosophy and literature in Seville.

He continued his studies of literature in Madrid and worked on the First Biennial Latin-American Art Festival.

== Career ==
Around 1954 Caballero Bonald served as Secretary and later as Deputy Editor of the Papeles de Son Armadans magazine.

In 1959 he began to make friends with and collaborate with poets who would later make up the Generation of 1950. This group of literary figures were united in their political opposition to the dictatorship of Francisco Franco.

In February 1959 in Collioure (France), he attended the 20th anniversary of the death of Antonio Machado, along with Blas de Otero, José Agustín Goytisolo, Ángel González, José Ángel Valente, Jaime Gil de Biedma, Alfonso Costafreda and Carlos Barral.

He moved to Bogotá, where he taught Spanish literature and humanities at the Universidad Nacional de Colombia. There he started his friendship with the Colombian group of the Mito magazine (composed of Jorge Gaitán Durán, Gabriel García Márquez, Eduardo Cote Lamus, Hernando Valencia Goelkel, Pedro Gómez Valderrama and Fernando Charry Lara, among others).

In 1963 he was arrested and fined for political reasons. He returned to Spain and took up several publishing posts.

Between 1965 and 1968 he spent time in Cuba and became part of an organization aimed at paying homage to Antonio Machado in Baeza in 1966, which was finally prohibited by government order. He published the Narrativa Cubana de la Revolución (Cuban Narrative of the Revolution) in 1968, and was again arrested for political reasons, and imprisoned for one month in Carabanchel jail.

In 1971 he began working for the Lexicography Seminar of the Royal Spanish Academy, where he stayed until 1975. In 1973 he also started working as literary editor for Júcar Publications, a position which he also occupied until 1975. He gave courses on narrative in several European universities and attended literary symposia.

He worked as a Contemporary Spanish Literature Professor at the Centre for Hispanic Studies at Bryn Mawr College in Pennsylvania from 1974 to 1978. That year he was appointed President of the PEN Club Español (from which he resigned in 1980). In Madrid, the National Drama Center performed his version of Abre el Ojo (Open Your Eye), by Rojas Zorrilla.

Between 1985 and 1988 he once again spent some time in the United States. In 1989 a high school bearing his name was inaugurated in Jerez. A public library bearing his name was inaugurated in Marbella in 1992.

In 1993 he was appointed corresponding member of the North American Spanish Language Academy. The National Classic Theatre Company performed his version of Don Gil de las Calzas Verdes (Sir Gil of the Green Stockings) by Tirso de Molina. The Sanlúcar de Barrameda Town Council named a street after him.

In 1997 the Antonio Gades Company performed his ballet adaptation of Fuenteovejuna. The Jerez City Council created the Caballero Bonald Foundation. He was awarded the title of Favourite Son of Andalucía.

In 1999 he was awarded the title of Favourite Son of the Province of Cadiz. He received the Golden Medal of the Fine Arts Circle and the Julián Besteiro Award for Arts and Literature.

In 2004 he was awarded a Doctor Honoris Causa by the University of Cádiz. He also won the Queen Sofía Latin American Poetry Award.

In 2012, he was awarded the Miguel de Cervantes Prize for his achievements in Spanish literature.

His birthplace in calle Caballeros in Jerez is now the site of his Foundation.

He died on May 9, 2021, at the age of 94 in Madrid after a long illness.

== Bibliography ==
- Mendigo (Beggar) (1950)
- Las Adivinaciones (The Prophecies)
- Memorias de Poco Tiempo (Memories of a Little While) (1954)
- Anteo (1956)
- Las Horas Muertas (The Dead Hours) (1959)
- El Papel del Coro (The Choir's Role) (1961)
- Dos Días de Setiembre (Two September Days)
- Pliegos de Cordel (Sheets of String) (1963)
- Narrativa Cubana de la Revolución (Cuban Narrative of the Revolution) (1968)
- Vivir para Contarlo (Live to Tell It) (1969)
- Archivo del Cante Flamenco (File of a Flamenco Singer) (1969)
- Ágata Ojo de Gato (Agatha Cat's Eyes) (1974)
- Luces y Sombras del Flamenco (Lights and Shades of Flamenco) (1975)
- Descrédito del Héroe (The Discrediting of a Hero) (1977)
- Poesía, 1951-1977 (1977)
- Breviario del Vino (Wine Breviary) (1980)
- Toda la Noche Oyeron pasar Pájaros (They Heard Birds Passing By All Night) (1981)
- Anthology of Góngora's poems (1982)
- Selección Natural (Natural Selection) (1983)
- Laberinto de Fortuna (Maze of Fortune) (1983)
- Los Personajes de Fajardo (The Fajardo Characters) (1986)
- De la Sierra al Mar de Cádiz (From the Mountain Range to the Cadiz Sea) (1988)
- En La Casa del Padre (In the Father's House) (1988)
- Doble Vida (Double Life) (1989)
- Andalucía (1989)
- Sevilla en Tiempos de Cervantes (Seville at the Time of Cervantes) (1992)
- Campo de Agramante (The Agramante Field) (1993)
- Tiempo de Guerras Perdidas (Time of Lost Wars) (1995)
- El Imposible Oficio de Escribir (The Impossible Profession of Writing) (1997)
- Diario de Argónida (1997)
- Poesía Amatoria (1999)
- Copias del Natural (Copies of the Natural) (1999)
- La Costumbre de Vivir (The Custom of Living) (2001)
- Mar Adentro (The Sea Inside) (2002)
- A study on José de Espronceda (2002)
- 250 programs of the documentary series Andalucía de Cine (2003) directed by Manuel Gutiérrez Aragón and produced by Juan Lebrón, for the Andalusian Radio and Television.
- Somos el Tiempo que nos Queda (We are the Time We Have Left) (complete works, 2004)

== Acclaim ==
- Platero Poetry Award - Mendigo (1950)
- Adonais Prize for Poetry (runner-up) - Las Adivinaciones (1951)
- Boscán Award - Las Horas Muertas (1959)
- Critics' Prize - Las Horas Muertas (1959)
- Premio Biblioteca Breve - Dos Días de Setiembre (1961)
- National Album Award - Archivo del Cante Flamenco (1969)
- Barral Award (rejected) - Ágata Ojo de Gato (1975)
- Critics' Prize - Ágata Ojo de Gato (1975)
- 'Pablo Iglesias' Literatura Award - Poesía, 1951-1977 (1977)
- Critics' Prize - Descrédito del Héroe (1978)
- Ateneo de Sevilla Prize - Toda la Noche Oyeron pasar Pájaros (1981)
- Plaza y Janés Award - En La Casa del Padre (1988)
- Andalucía Literature Award - Campo de Agramante (1993)
- Queen Sofia Award for Latin American Poetry (2004)
- Spanish Literature National Prize (2005)
- Miguel de Cervantes Prize (2012) - lifelong achievement in Spanish literature.
