= Manuel Álvarez Ortega =

Spanish poet (1923–2014)

- Born: 4 March 1923; Córdoba, Spain
- Died: 14 June 2014 (aged 91); Madrid, Spain
- Education: University of Seville
- Occupations: Veterinarian, poet, translator, writer
- Website: http://www.fmao.es

Manuel Álvarez Ortega (Córdoba, 4 March 1923 – Madrid, 14 June 2014) was a Spanish poet, translator, writer, and veterinarian. He was the director and founder of the journal Aglae, which circulated between 1949 and 1954. He wrote many of his works in Madrid, the city where he lived starting in 1951.

== Biography ==
Álvarez Ortega was born on 4 March 1923, at number 4, Calle Santa Victoria in Córdoba. He was the fifth child of Mariano Álvarez Berard and Paula Ortega Soria. He was baptized on 6 April 1923 in the Church of El Salvador y Santo Domingo de Silos. He began his studies in 1935 at the provincial Institute. Álvarez Ortega completed his diploma in 1942 and then studied at the Veterinary School (Facultad de Veterinaria) in Córdoba, which at that time belonged to the University of Seville (Universidad de Sevilla). Starting in 1951, he worked as a veterinarian, after taking the public exam for the position, at the Military Academy of Health (Academia de Sanidad Militar) in Madrid, a position that he left in 1972 to dedicate himself full time to literature. Álvarez Ortega died on 14 June 2014, at 91 years old. He was the brother of painter and poet Rafael Álvarez Ortega.

== Literary career ==
In April 1948 Álvarez Ortega's first book, La huella de las cosas (a selection of poems written between 1941 and 1948), was self-published in Córdoba. In April 1949, the first number of the journal Aglae came out, presented as an anthology. In March 1950, his second book was published, Clamor de todo espacio, in the collection Aglae. In 1954, his book Hombre de otro tiempo is published, also in Aglae. In December 1954, Álvarez Ortega was a finalist for the Adonais Prize with his book Exilio, published the following year. In 1955, with José García Nieto, López Anglada, Leopoldo de Luis, Ramón de Garciasol, and others, he founded the collection Palabra y Tiempo with the publisher Taurus.

With the translation in 1960 of Crónica, by Saint-John Perse, for a special number of the journal Poesía Española, published as a tribute to the then-recent winner of the Nobel Prize, Álvarez Ortega begins his period as a translator, which will continue throughout his life. Among other authors, he translated into Spanish the poetry of René Char, Bataille, Bonnefoy, Jaccottet, Desnos, Tzara, Artaud, Michaux, Aragon, Ponge, Leiris, Queneau, Senghor, Lanza de Vasto, Péret, Éluard, Laforgue, Breton, Péret, La Tour du Pin, Jarry, Lautréamont, Oscar Miłosz, and Apollinaire.

In April 1962 his books Dios de un día y Tiempo en el Sur came out in a single volume, in the collection Palabra y Tiempo from Taurus. In December 1963, Álvarez Ortega won a secondary award under the Adonais Prize for Invención de la muerte, which was published in February of the following year. In September 1964, he contributed to the anthology Poesía belga contemporánea, published by Aguilar. Following this anthology came others: Poesía francesa contemporánea (1967), for which he received the National Translation Prize (Premio Nacional de Traducción); Poesía simbolista francesa (1975) and Veinte poetas franceses del siglo veinte (2001). In May 1967, he collaborated with the Televisión Española program El oro del tiempo, directed by the poet José García Nieto. Previously he had worked with the program El alma se serena, also on Televisión Española, and directed by the poet Juan Van-Halen. That same year he published two books, Despedida en el tiempo and Oscura marea. In December his one-act play, Fábula de la Dama y los alpinistas, was performed. In 1969, his books Oficio de los días and Reino memorable came out in a single volume. In 1972, he published Carpe diem, and his Antología Poética (1941–71), with a prologue by Marcos Ricardo Barnatán, was released by the publisher Plaza y Janés. In 1973, Tenebrae came out as a supplement of the journal Cuadernos Hispanoamericanos, and in January 1975, Génesis was published by Visor. Also in 1973, several of his translations began to be published, with poets like Apollinaire, Segalen, Éluard, Saint-John Perse, and others.

Following the publication of several minor works (Fiel infiel; Escrito en el Sur; Templo de la mortalidad; Lilia culpa, and Sea la sombra), in 1988 Álvarez Ortega published Gesta and, in 1990, Código, both with Devenir, directed by Juan Pastor. In 1992, he published as a book and cassette (in the author's voice) Génesis with Ediciones Portuguesas. In 1993, Liturgia was released and, in 1997, Intratexto, both with Devenir. In April 1998, the same publisher released a book-homage, Dedicatoria, with works by several poets and an extensive study of his work. In 2001, his candidacy for the Nobel Prize was proposed and accepted by the Swedish Academy for the first time. In 2002, Desde otra edad was published. In 2003, his second candidacy was proposed for the Nobel Prize. In 2005 the publisher Huerga y Fierro released Despedida en el tiempo: Antología poética (1941–2001), in an edition by Marcos-Ricardo Barnatán. In 2006, Álvarez Ortega's Obra Poética (1941–2005) was published by Visor and the following year Devenir published Antología Poética (1941–2005). That same year Adviento came out and one year later the publishing house Huerga y Fierro released Mantia Fidelis. Álvarez Ortega's last two published books of poetry are Cenizas son los días (Devenir, 2010) and Ultima necat (Abada, 2012).

== The Manuel Álvarez Ortega Foundation ==
In November 2015, the Manuel Álvarez Ortega Foundation was established with a notarized signature on the founding statutes, according to Álvarez Ortega's will. The Board of Trustees of the Foundation, directed by Juan Pastor, trustee of Álvarez Ortega along with Jaime Siles and Margarita Prieto, includes people such as Jaime Siles, Antonio Colinas, Marcos Ricardo Barnatán, César Antonio Molina, Fanny Rubio, and Margarita Prieto (secretary). The purpose of the entity is the conservation, study, and diffusion of the documents, books, images, and correspondence of Álvarez Ortega. In June 2021, the Manuel Álvarez Ortega Foundation's collection of archives was entrusted to the Universidad de Córdoba. This legacy contains, among other materials, the author's letters, in addition to unpublished works.

== Poetry ==
- La huella de las cosas (Imprenta Ibérica, Córdoba, 1948)
- Clamor de todo espacio (Aglae, Córdoba, 1950)
- Hombre de otro tiempo (Aglae, Córdoba, 1954)
- Exilio (Adonais, Madrid, 1955)
- Dios de un día / Tiempo en el Sur (Taurus, Madrid, 1962)
- Invención de la muerte (Adonais, Madrid, 1964)
- Despedida en el tiempo (Pájaro Cascabel, México-Madrid, 1967)
- Oscura marea (Librería El Guadalhorce, Málaga, 1968)
- Oficio de los días / Reino memorable (Arbolé, Madrid, 1969)
- Carpen diem (Provincia, León, 1972)
- Antología 1941–1971 (Plaza y Janés, Barcelona, 1972)
- Tenebrae (Cuadernos hispanoamericanos - Instituto de Cultura Hispánica, Madrid 1973)
- Génesis (Visor, Madrid, 1975)
- Fiel infiel (Provincia, León, 1977)
- Escrito en el Sur (Premios Literarios Ciudad de Irún, San Sebastián, 1979)
- Templo de la mortalidad (Fundación Rielo, Madrid, 1982)
- Sea la sombra (Cuadernos Hispanoamericanos - Cooperación Iberoamericana, Madrid, 1984)
- Lilia Culpa (Antorcha de Paja, Córdoba, 1984)
- Gesta (Devenir, Barcelona, 1988)
- Código (Devenir, Madrid, 1990)
- Liturgia (Devenir, Madrid, 1993)
- Obra Poética (1941.1991) (Edición no venal, Madrid, 1993)
- Clautro del día (Antelia, Madrid, 1996)
- Corpora Terrae (Antelia, Madrid, 1998)
- Desde otra edad (Devenir, Madrid, 2002)
- Égloga de un tiempo perdido (Antelia, Madrid, 2003)
- Despedida en el tiempo (1941–2001) Antología poética. (Huerga y Fierro, Madrid, 2004)
- Visitación (Antelia, Madrid, 2005)
- Obra poética (1941–2005) (Visor, Madrid, 2006)
- Antología Poética (2041–2005) (Devenir, Madrid, 2007)
- Adviento (Antelia, Madrid, 2007)
- Mantia Fidelis (Huerga y Fierro, Madrid, 2008)
- Cenizas son los días (Devenir, Madrid, 2010)
- Ultima necat (Abada, Madrid, 2012)

== Essay ==
- Intratexto (Devenir, Madrid, 1997)
- Diálogo (Devenir, Madrid, 2013)

== Theater ==
- Fábula de la dama y los alpinistas (Antelia, Madrid, 2008)
- La travesía (Un sueño, o no) (Antelia, Madrid, 2009)

== Recordings ==
- Génesis. Texto íntegro en la voz del autor. Book and cassette (Ediciones portuguesas, Valladolid, 1992)

== Anthologies ==
- Poesía belga contemporánea. With other translators (Aguilar, Madrid, 1964)
- Poesía francesa contemporánea (Taurus, Madrid 1967; 2nd ed. Akal, Madrid, 1983)
- Poesía simbolista francesa (Editora Nacional, Madrid, 1975; 2nd ed. Akal, Madrid, 1984)
- Veinte poetas franceses del siglo veinte (Devenir, Madrid, 2001)

== Translations ==
- Crónica (by Saint-John Perse, Poesía Española, 95, Madrid, 1960)
- Salmos (by Patrice de la Tour du Pin, Plaza y Janés, Barcelona, 1972)
- Antología poética (by Apollinaire, Visor, Madrid, 1973)
- Estelas (by Victor Segalen, Visor, Madrid, 1974)
- El amor, la poesía (by Paul Éluard, Visor, Madrid, 1975)
- Poemas (by Jules Laforgue, Plaza y Janés, Barcelona, 1975)
- Pájaros y otros poemas (by Saint-John Perse, Visor, Madrid, 1976)
- Poemas. 2 Vols. (by André Breton, Visor, Madrid, 1978)
- El gran juego (by Benjamin Péret, Visor, Madrid, 1978)
- Antología (by Alfred Jarry, Visor, Madrid, 1982)
- Obra Completa (by Lautréamont, Akal, Madrid, 1988)
- Sinfonías/Salmos (by O.V. de L. Milosz, Antelia, Madrid, 2004)
- Cántico del conocimiento (by O.V de L. Milosz, Antelia, Madrid, 2005)
- Antología poética (by O.V. de L. Milosz, Devenir, Madrid, 2008)

== Translations of His Works ==
- Poemas / Poems. English version by Louis Bourne (Antelia, Madrid, 2002)
- Genèse / Domaine de l'ombre. French version by Jacques Ancet (Le Taillis Pré, Châtelineau, 2012)Poussières d'étoiles
- Hieren Todas: Antología poética plurilingüe. Multilingual anthology. Edition and epilogue by Guillermo Aguirre, Prologue by Rosa Pereda (Devenir, Madrid, 2022).

== Books about His Works ==
- Multiple authors. A Manuel Álvarez Ortega. Dedicatoria (Devenir, Madrid, 1998).
- Asunción Córdoba: Fábula muerta. En torno al universo simbólico en la poesía de Manuel Álvarez Ortega (Devenir, Madrid, 2008). [Originally presented as a doctoral thesis, Universidad de Alicante (1991), with the title: Fábula muerta: el universo simbólico de Álvarez Ortega]
- Ruiz Soriano, Francisco. La poesía de Manuel Álvarez Ortega (Devenir, Madrid, 2013). [Published previously by Antelia, Madrid, 2009]
- Ruiz Soriano, Francisco. Aglae (1949–1953) de Manuel Álvarez Ortega, una revista de postguerra (Huerga y Fierro, Madrid, 2016)
- Sánchez Dueñas, Blas (ed.). Manuel Álvarez Ortega y su tiempo (Devenir, Madrid, 2018)
- Alarcón Sierra, Rafael (ed.). La poética de la modernidad y la obra de Manuel Álvarez Ortega (Devenir, Madrid, 2019)
- Torralbo Caballero, Juan de Dios (ed.). Manuel Álvarez Ortega. Traducción poética, lucidez, crítica social y denuncia (Devenir, Madrid, 2020)

== Monographs in Journals ==
- Multiple authors. "Manuel Álvarez Ortega" (Coord. Marcos Ricardo Barnatán), Fablas. Revista de Poesía y Crítica, no. 34–35, 1972.
- Antorcha de Paja, Pliego de Poesía, no. 3, Córdoba, Feb. 1974.
- Culturas, newspaper supplement to Córdoba, Córdoba, May 20, 1986.
- Multiple authors. "Manuel Álvarez Ortega" (Coord. Francisco Ruiz Soriano), Barcarola. Revista de Creación Literaria, no. 58–59, 1999.
- Multiple authors. "Manuel Álvarez Ortega" (Coord. Juan Pastor), La Manzana Poética, no. 32, 2013.

== Awards ==
- 1963 Runner-up, Premio Adonáis de Poesía for his book Invención de la muerte.
- 1967 Premio Nacional de Traducción for his anthology Poesía francesa contemporánea.
- 1976 Premio de la IV Bienal de Poesía de la Provincia de León, for his book Fiel Infiel.
- 1978 Premio Ciudad de Irún, for Escrito en el Sur.
- 1981 I Premio de Poesía Mística de la Fundación Fernando Rielo, Madrid, for Templo de mortalidad.
- 1999 Premio de las Letras de Córdoba, from la Diputación de Córdoba.

== Recognition ==
- 2001 Presentation of candidacy for the Nobel Prize by the University of St. Gallen. Proposal accepted by the Swedish Academy.
- 2003 Proposal of candidacy for the Nobel Prize by the Círculo de Bellas Artes. Proposal accepted by the Swedish Academy.
- 2007 Gold Medal of Andalusia (Medalla de Oro de Andalucía), by the Government of Andalusia (Junta de Andalucía).

== Bibliography ==
- Barnatán, Marcos Ricardo. "Medio siglo de poesía francesa: Poesía Francesa contemporánea de Manuel Álvarez Ortega", Cuadernos Hispanoamericanos, no. 219, Madrid, March 1968.
- Barnatán, Marcos Ricardo. "Álvarez Ortega: personalidad de un poeta", Cuadernos Hispanoamericanos, no. 248–49, Madrid, Aug–Sept. 1970.
- Bernal, Jordi. "Invención del envés de la muerte". Barcarola. Revista de Creación Literaria, no. 58–59, Albacete, Nov. 1999.
- Bouza, Antonio L. "Poesía simbolista francesa de Álvarez Ortega", Jano, no. 195, Barcelona, October 1975.
- Carnero, Guillermo. "Manuel Álvarez Ortega: Alegoría del mar frente al Dios/niño, Fablas. Revista de Poesía y crítica, no. 34-35, Las Palmas de Gran Canaria, Sept–Oct. 1972.
- Carrión, Manuel. "Invención de la muerte, Álvarez Ortega", Rocamador, no. 38, Palencia, 1963.
- Casado, Miguel. "Los libros del año. Código, Manuel Álvarez Ortega", EL Urogallo, no. 52–53, Madrid, Sept–Oct. 1990.
- Champourcin, Ernestina de. "Fiel infiel de Manuel Álvarez Ortega", Poesía Hispánica, no. 294, Madrid, June 1977.
- Colinas, Antonio. "Álvarez Ortega: un reconocimiento", Fablas. Revista de poesía y crítica, no. 34–35, Las Palmas de Gran Canaria, Sept–Oct. 1972.
- Colinas, Antonio."Perse: La palabra metálica y antigua en traducción de Álvarez Ortega", Informaciones de las Artes y Las Letras, Madrid, January 6, 1977.
- Crémer, Victoriano. "La huella de las cosas por Manuel Álvarez Ortega", Espadaña no. 36, León, 1948.
- Entrambasaguas, Joaquín de. "El poeta Álvarez Ortega", Revista de Literatura, Madrid, 1954.
- Fernández, Miguel. "Té con Yerbabuena", Fablas,no. 34–35, Las Palmas de Gran Canaria, Sept–Oct. 1972.
- García López, Ángel. "Manuel Álvarez Ortega: Carpe diem", La Estafeta Literaria, no. 497, Madrid, August 1972.
- García Velazco, Macerlino. "Álvarez Ortega, Dios de un día", Rocamador, no. 26, Palencia, 1962.
- Gil, Idelfonso-Manuel. "Elegía de otro tiempo", Cuadernos Hispanoamericanos, no. 67, Madrid, July 1955.
- Gómez Niza, Pío. "Manuel Álvarez Ortega La huella de las cosas", Manantial, no. 4, Melilla 1949.
- Gutiérrez, José. "Álvarez Ortega: Reflexión desde la ausencia", Ínsula, no. 470, Madrid, January 1986.
- Iglesias Laguna, Antonio. "Manuel Ávarez Ortega, Invención de la muerte", La Estafeta Literaria, no. 293, Madrid, June 1964.
- Jiménez Martos, Luis. "Manuel Álvarez Ortega: Dios de un día", La Estafeta Literaria, Madrid, April 1963.
- Jiménez Martos, Luis. "Álvarez Ortega: Despedida en el tiempo", La Estafeta Literaria, no. 381–382, Madrid, Oct–Nov. 1967.
- Jiménez Martos, Luis. "Álvarez Ortega: Oscura marea", La Estafeta Literaria, no. 412, Madrid, January 1969.
- López Gorgé, Jacinto. "Manuel Álvarez Ortega: Hombre de otro tiempo", Ketama, no. 5, Tetuán, 1954.
- López Gorgé, Jacinto. "Manuel Álvarez Ortega: Exilio", Ketama, no. 6, Tetuán, 1955.
- López Gradolí, Alfonso. "Ahora apagando un pitillo en el mármol de los veladores del literario Café Gijón", Fablas, no. 34–35, Las Palmas de Gran Canaria, Sept–Oct. 1972.
- López Luna, Antonio. "Manuel Álvarez Ortega. Oficio de los días", Cuadernos Hispanoamericanos, no. 248–249, Madrid, Aug–Sept. de 1970.
- López Luna, Antonio. "Carta a Manolo Álvarez Ortega", Fablas, no. 34–35, Las Palmas de Gran Canaria, Sept–Oct. 1972.
- López Martínez, José. "Poemas de Jules Laforgue. Versión de Álvarez Ortega", Poesía Hispánica, no. 285, Madrid, Sept. 1976.
- Luis, Leopoldo de. "Hombre de otro tiempo por Álvarez Ortega", Poesía Española, no. 36, Madrid, 1954.
- Luis, Leopoldo de. "Exilio de Manuel Álvarez Ortega", Poesía Española, no. 53, Madrid, May 1956.
- Manrique de Lara, José. "Dios de un día de Álvarez Ortega", Poesía Española, no. 119, Madrid, 1962.
- Mayrata, Ramón. "Carpen diem como ejemplo", Fablas. Revista de poesía y crítica, no. 34–35, Las Palmas de Gran Canaria, Sept–Oct. 1972.
- Medina Bañón, Raquel. "Exilio interior y exilio poético: Manuel Álvarez Ortega y la escritura del silencio", España Contemporánea. Revista de Literatura y Cultura, T.XIII, no. 2, Ohio State University, Fall 2000.
- Mercader, Trina. "La huella de las cosas", Al-Motamid, no. 16, Larache, 1949.
- Miró, Emilio. "Álvarez Ortega: Despedida en el tiempo", Ínsula, no. 270, Madrid, May 1969.
- Miró, Emilio. "Crónica de Poesía. La continuidad de cuatro poetas", Ínsula, no. 278, Madrid, January 1970.
- Miró, Emilio. "Poetas andaluces. Álvarez Ortega", Ínsula, no. 383, Madrid, October 1978.
- Miró, Emilio. "Gesta, Álvarez Ortega: Belleza y Temporalidad", Ínsula, no. 511, Madrid, July 1989.
- Moga, Eduardo. "La poesía es verdad porque es imposible", Lateral, no. 30, Barcelona, June 1997.
- Moga, Eduardo. "La inteligencia del tiempo", Turia, no. 41, Instituto de Estudios Turolenses, June 1997.
- Moga, Eduardo. "Manuel Álvarez Ortega: la intel·ligència de l’emoció", Le Pou de Lletres, no. 10, Barcelona, Summer 1998.
- Molina, César Antonio. "Saint-John Perse: Pájaros y otros poemas, versión de Álvarez Ortega", Ínsula, no. 366, Madrid, May 1977.
- Montobbio, Santiago. "La ceniza dicta su verdad. Gesta de Manuel Álvarez Ortega", El Ciervo, no. 449–450, Barcelona, July–Aug. 1988.
- Morcillo, Françoise. "Quand un poète traduit un altre poète. Manuel Álvarez Ortega et Miguel Veyrat", Anales de Filología Francesa, Dec. 2004.
- Multiple Authors. "Dossier: Manuel Álvarez Ortega" (collection of articles), Barcarola. Revista de Creación Literaria, no. 58–59, Albacete, Nov. 1999.
- Murciano, Carlos. "Despedida en el tiempo de Manuel Álvarez Ortega", Poesía Española, no. 181, Madrid, January 1968.
- Murciano, Carlos. "Carpe Diem de Manuel Álvarez Ortega", Poesía Hispánica, no. 242, Madrid, June 1973.
- Nicolás, César. "Carpe diem o el rito de la salamandra", Fablas. Revista de poesía y crítica, no. 34–35, Las Palmas de Gran Canaria, Sept–Oct. 1972.
- Núñez, Vicente. "Manuel Álvarez Ortega: Hombre de otro tiempo", Caracola, no. 28, Málaga, February 1955.
- Quiñonero, Pedro. "Segalen y Álvarez Ortega", Informaciones de las Artes y Las Letras, Madrid, November 14, 1974.
- Quiñones, Fernando. "Manuel Álvarez Ortega: Invención de la muerte", Cuadernos Hispanoamericanos, no. 174, June 1964.
- Quiroga Clérigo, Manuel. "Teorías de Álvarez Ortega", Cuadernos del Sur, Diario Córdoba, April 17, 1997.
- Roldán, Mariano. "La mantenida voz". Telerradio, Madrid, April 26, 1964.
- Ruiz Soriano, Francisco. "La poesía de Manuel Álvarez Ortega”, Donaire, no. 12, Consejería de Educación de la Embajada de España en Londres, April 1999.
- Ruiz Soriano, Francisco. “Conversación con Manuel Álvarez Ortega: la fidelidad a la poesía”, Donaire, no. 14, Consejería de Educación de la Embajada de España en Londres, June 2000.
- Ruiz Soriano, Francisco. “Poemas de Álvarez Ortega”, Quimera. Revista de Literatura, no. 224–225, Barcelona, January 2003.
- Ruiz Soriano, Francisco. “Manuel Álvarez Ortega: la poesía de lo humano eterno”, Quimera. Revista de Literatura, no. 249, Barcelona, October 2004.
- Ruiz Soriano, Francisco. “Despedida en el tiempo (1941–2001). Antología poética”, Cuadernos Hispanoamericanos, no. 656, Madrid, February 2005.
- Ruiz Soriano, Francisco. “Poems by Manuel Álvarez Ortega between Modernism and the Metaphysical Tradition”, Bulletin of Hispanic Studies, vol. 83, no. 6, 2006.
- Ruiz Soriano, Francisco. “La mansión irredenta de la poesía. Ceniza son los días de Manuel Álvarez Ortega”, Quimera. Revista de Literatura, no. 341, Barcelona, April 2012.
- Ruiz Soriano, Francisco. “Reivindicaciones de Manuel Álvarez Ortega”, La Manzana Poética. Revista de literatura, creación, estudios literarios y crítica, n.º 32, Córdoba, Nov. 2012.
- Ruiz Soriano, Francisco. “Álvarez Ortega: la ontología de la negatividad”, Cuadernos Hispanoamericanos, no. 772, October 2014.
- Siles, Jaime. "Manuel Álvarez Ortega: Oficio de los días", La Estafeta Literaria, no. 432, Madrid, Nov. 1969.
- Siles, Jaime. "Álvarez Ortega o el sentimiento del lenguaje", Fablas. Revista de poesía y crítica, no. 34–35, Las Palmas de Gran Canaria, Sept–Oct. 1972.
- Torres, Cipriano. "Álvarez Ortega, Rilke español", Cuadernos del Mediodía, no. 104, Granada, April 1985.
- Torres, Raúl. "Álvarez Ortega: Despedida en el tiempo", Tiempo Nuevo, no. 42, Madrid, Sept. 1967.
- Umbral, Francisco. "Invención de la muerte de Manuel Álvarez Ortega", Poesía Española, no. 136, Madrid, June 1964.
- Umbral, Francisco. "Poesía francesa contemporánea de Manuel Álvarez Ortega", Poesía Española, no. 181, Madrid, June 1968.
- Umbral, Francisco. "Oscura marea de Manuel Álvarez Ortega", Poesía Española, no. 190, Madrid, October 1968.
