= Alfredo J. Ramos Campos =

Spanish poet and editor

Alfredo J. Ramos is a Spanish poet and editor born in Talavera de la Reina, Toledo, Spain in 1954.

He was awarded a Bachelor of Information Science from the Complutense University in Madrid.

His first book of poetry, Esquinas del destierro (Corners of Exile) (1976), is a neo-romantic work and obtained a runner-up for the Adonais prize for unknown poets. He also wrote Territorio de gestos fugitivos (Territory of Fugitive Gestures) in 1980. With El sol de medianoche (The Midnight Sun) (1986), he won the Castilla-La Mancha Prize of Poetry. He is also editor and writer of the famous Espasa encyclopedia, the general encyclopedia printed in most of the world, with almost 200 volumes.

Ramos has also written many travelogue books, among them on the cities of the Camino de Santiago.

== Works ==
=== Poetry ===
- Esquinas del destierro. Ediciones Rialp. 1976. ISBN 978-84-321-1852-4.
- Territorio de gestos fugitivos. Madrid: Colectivo La Troje. 1980. ISBN 978-84-300-3757-5.
- El sol de medianoche. Servicio de Publicaciones de la Junta de Castila-La Mancha. 1988. ISBN 978-84-7788-028-8.

=== Travel ===
- Castilla y León. Grupo Anaya, S.A. (Anaya Touring). 1996. ISBN 978-84-8165-414-1.
- La Rioja. Anaya Touring. 1998. ISBN 978-84-8165-586-5.
- Extremadura. Anaya Touring. 1998. ISBN 978-84-8165-065-5. & Santiago Llorente
- Toda Andalucía rural. Anaya Touring. 1996. ISBN 978-84-8165-439-4.
- Castilla-La Mancha. Anaya Touring. 2005. ISBN 978-84-9776-158-1. & Fernando de Giles
- El Camino de Santiago. Anaya Touring. 1990. ISBN 978-84-207-3708-9. & Others
- España de punta a punta. Anaya Touring. 1996. ISBN 84-8165-320-9. & Others
