= Miguel de Cervantes Prize =

Award for exemplary contributions to literature in the Spanish language

- Medal of the Miguel de Cervantes Prize
- Country: Spain
- Presented by: Ministry of Culture
- Reward: €125,000
- First award: 1976
- Website: CervantesPresentacion

The Miguel de Cervantes Prize (Spanish: Premio de Literatura en Lengua Castellana Miguel de Cervantes) is awarded annually to honour the lifetime achievement of an outstanding writer in the Spanish language. The Encyclopædia Britannica calls it the "most prestigious and remunerative award given for Spanish-language literature".

== History ==
The prize was established in 1975 by the Ministry of Culture of Spain and first awarded the following year. The winner receives a monetary award of €125,000, which makes it one of the richest literary prizes in the world. The prize rewards authors from any Spanish-speaking nation and recognizes the recipient's overall body of work. Of the forty-seven prizes awarded in the history of the Cervantes Prize, only six have ever been awarded to women. In 1988, the Spanish writer María Zambrano (1904–1991) was the first female writer to be honored. The award is named after Miguel de Cervantes, author of Don Quixote. The candidates are proposed by the Association of Spanish Language Academies (i.e., the Royal Spanish Academy).

As of the presentation of the 2024 award to Álvaro Pombo, the recipients have been recognized for their writing of novels, poetry, short stories, essays, translations, philosophy or dramas – or for combinations thereof. With two winners in 1979, there have been 50 recipients of the Miguel de Cervantes Prize.

=== The Cervantes Prize and the Nobel Prize in Literature ===
Three of the 50 winners of the Miguel de Cervantes Prize have also won the Nobel Prize in Literature. Octavio Paz (Cervantes 1981, Nobel 1990) and Mario Vargas Llosa (Cervantes 1994, Nobel 2010), were awarded the Nobel Prize in subsequent years, while Camilo José Cela received the Nobel Prize in 1989 and was awarded the Cervantes Prize in 1995.

== Laureates ==
The list of winners is available at the official Premio 'Miguel Cervantes' website.

Year	Picture	Winner	Country	Genre(s)	Ref.
1976		Jorge Guillén	Spain	poetry	
1977		Alejo Carpentier	Cuba	novel, essay	
1978		Dámaso Alonso	Spain	poetry	
1979		Jorge Luis Borges	Argentina	short story, poetry, essay, translation	
1979		Gerardo Diego	Spain	poetry	
1980		Juan Carlos Onetti	Uruguay	novel	
1981		Octavio Paz	Mexico	poetry, essay	
1982		Luis Rosales	Spain	poetry, essay	
1983		Rafael Alberti	Spain	poetry	
1984		Ernesto Sabato	Argentina	novel, essay	
1985		Gonzalo Torrente Ballester	Spain	novel	
1986		Antonio Buero Vallejo	Spain	drama	
1987		Carlos Fuentes	Mexico	novel, essay	
1988		María Zambrano	Spain	philosophy, essay	
1989		Augusto Roa Bastos	Paraguay	novel	
1990		Adolfo Bioy Casares	Argentina	novel, short story	
1991		Francisco Ayala	Spain	novel, short story, essay, translation	
1992		Dulce María Loynaz	Cuba	poetry	
1993		Miguel Delibes	Spain	novel	
1994		Mario Vargas Llosa	Peru	novel, essay, short story, drama	
1995		Camilo José Cela	Spain	novel	
1996		José García Nieto	Spain	poetry	
1997		Guillermo Cabrera Infante	Cuba	novel	
1998		José Hierro	Spain	poetry	
1999		Jorge Edwards	Chile	novel	
2000		Francisco Umbral	Spain	novel, essay	
2001		Álvaro Mutis	Colombia	poetry, novel	
2002		José Jiménez Lozano	Spain	novel	
2003		Gonzalo Rojas	Chile	poetry	
2004		Rafael Sánchez Ferlosio	Spain	novel, essay	
2005		Sergio Pitol	Mexico	novel	
2006		Antonio Gamoneda	Spain	poetry	
2007		Juan Gelman	Argentina	poetry	
2008		Juan Marsé	Spain	novel	
2009		José Emilio Pacheco	Mexico	poetry, novel, short story	
2010		Ana María Matute	Spain	novel	
2011		Nicanor Parra	Chile	poetry	
2012		José Manuel Caballero Bonald	Spain	poetry, novel	
2013		Elena Poniatowska	Mexico	novel	
2014		Juan Goytisolo	Spain	novel, essay	
2015		Fernando del Paso	Mexico	novel, poetry, essay, drama, short story	
2016		Eduardo Mendoza	Spain	novel, drama	
2017		Sergio Ramírez	Nicaragua	novel, short story, essay	
2018		Ida Vitale	Uruguay	poetry, prose, essay	
2019		Joan Margarit	Spain	poetry	
2020		Francisco Brines	Spain	poetry	
2021		Cristina Peri Rossi	Uruguay	prose, poetry, short story, translation	
2022		Rafael Cadenas	Venezuela	poetry, essay	
2023		Luis Mateo Díez	Spain	novel, essay	
2024		Álvaro Pombo	Spain	novel, short story, poetry, essay	
2025		Gonzalo Celorio	Mexico	novel, essay	
2026		Cristina Fernández Cubas	Spain	short story	

== Laureates per country ==
The following table shows the number of laureates per country:

Rank	Country	Laureates
1	Spain	27
2	Mexico	7
3	Argentina	4
4	Chile	3
4	Cuba	3
4	Uruguay	3
7	Colombia	1
7	Nicaragua	1
7	Paraguay	1
7	Peru	1
7	Venezuela	1
	Total	52
