= Susana March =

Spanish writer and poet

Susana March Alcalá (28 January 1915 – 21 December 1990) was a Spanish writer and poet who wrote using colloquial language. Born in Barcelona, she published her first poems in 1932, at the age of 17. She married the writer Ricardo Fernández de la Reguera, and together they worked on continuing with the national events founded by Benito Pérez Galdós, publishing the Episodios Nacionales. In 1953, she was a runner up for the Premio Adonáis de Poesía for her book, La tristeza.

== Works ==
=== Poetry ===
- Rutas (1938)
- La pasión desvelada (1946)
- Ardiente voz (1946)
- El viento (1951)
- La tristeza (1953)
- Esa mujer que soy (1959)
- Los poemas del hijo (1970)
- Poemas de la Plaza Real (1987)

=== Novels ===
- El tesoro escondido (1940)
- El velero cautivo (1941)
- Una alondra en la casa (1943)
- Nido de vencejos (1943)
- Canto rodado (1944)
- La otra Isabel (1944)
- Cumbre solitaria (1945)
- Nina (1949)
- Algo muere cada día (1955)
- Cosas que pasan (1983)

=== Episodes in collaboration with Ricardo Fernández de la Reguera ===
- Héroes de Cuba (1963)
- Héroes de Filipinas (1963)
- Fin de una regencia (1964)
- La boda de Alfonso XIII (1965)
- La semana trágica (1966)
- España neutral (1914–1918) (1967)
- El desastre de Annual (1969)
- La dictadura I. El directorio militar (1923–1925) (1969)
- La dictadura II. El régimen civil (1926–1930) (1971)
- La caída de un rey (1972)
- La República I (1979)
- La República II (Unpublished)
