= Aurelio González Ovies =

Spanish writer and poet from Asturias (born 1964)

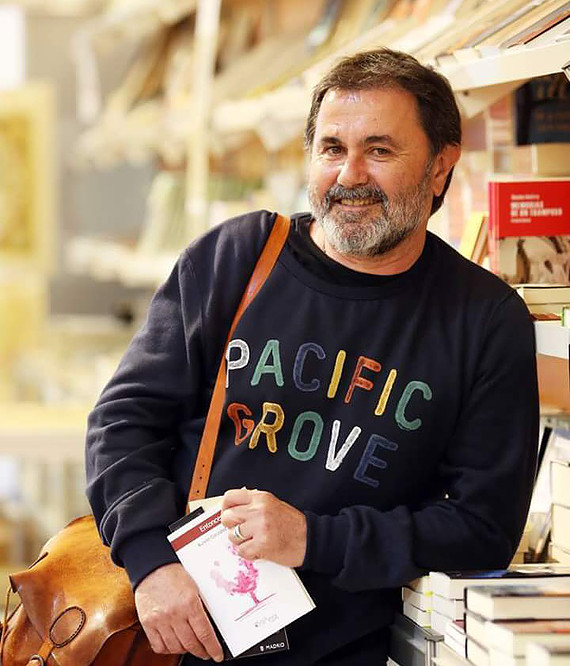
- Aurelio González Ovies in 2017
- Born: February 9, 1964; Bañugues, Spain
- Occupations: Professor of Latin Philology, poet, opinion columnist
- Writing career
- Genres: poetry, prose poetry, opinion articles
- Notable awards: Runner-up Adonais Prize, 1992 Hispanic American Poetry Juan Ramón Jiménez prize. 1992
- Website: www.aureliogonzalezovies.com

Aurelio González Ovies (born February 9, 1964) is a Spanish writer and poet from Asturias. He has a Ph.D in Classical Philology and he is a Professor of Latin Philology at the University of Oviedo. In words of the writer Victor Alperi:

"a poet-not forgetting his role as a university professor and feature writer-with a very personal vision of human reality, highlighting within the rich panorama of contemporary Spanish poetry with an original voice. Not belonging to literary groups, imposing his style since his first book (...)".

From his first collection of poems, Las horas en vano (1989), to the most recent, No (2009), in his poetic works include several literary awards and the anthology compiled twenty years of poems Esta luz tan breve (Poesía 1988-2008) where the poet gathers around 150 poems in which some of the more used gender issues loom: love and heartbreak, loneliness, death and childhood. Michael Florián, Spanish poet and critic, presumes in the preface that "the reading of poetry Aurelio González Ovies comforts, offers beauty and truth revealed and clean world".

In 2007 initiates its walking in children's literature with the publication in the Pintar-Pintar editorial, El poema que cayó a la mar it has been a success in the children poetic world and after this one, another six illustrated albums of poetry were added . Several of these titles are co-published in different languages (Castilian, Catalan, Asturian), and the last, Versonajes (2013), has recently been awarded by the Ministry of Education, Culture and Sport with an Award for the Best Book Published in Spain in 2014 at the category of Youth and Children's Books.

María García Esperón, Mexican writer of children's literature, has committed years revealing the word of Aurelio González Ovies around the world through the dissemination of his work online. In his opinion, "his poetry is born from the simple experience, the feeling of love by the roots, love of what we are, the wonder of feel alive and to assess the difficult things in life: death, separation ... all that we human beings living as an opportunity more than beauty ".

The poetry of Aurelio González Ovies has recently been the object of study at the University of Oviedo in a Doctoral Thesis, developed by Sara María Bárcena de Cuendias and directed by Antonio Fernandez Insuela. The author of the first thesis on the Asturian poet explains that "his poetry serves to him to vindicate the free poet, against the tide, out of tune in the best sense of the word".

He is also a regular contributor to Asturian newspapers, currently writes a biweekly article, in a poetic tone, for La Nueva España. Since "his poetry is simple (it should be known that poetic simplicity is a gift, there is no grammar course to access to it) and deep; his verses come to the common reader, the reader from every day, and also, of course, the knowledgeable reader form, musicality, style, originality, and the message of the word ".

== Literary prizes ==
- International poetry prize Ángel González. 1990.
- International poetry prize Feria del Libro-Ateneo Jovellanos. 1991.
- Hispanic American Poetry Juan Ramón Jiménez prize. 1992.
- Runner-up Adonais Prize, 1992
- Runner-up Esquío prize. 1994.

== Poetry ==
- Las horas en vano. Plaquette. Heracles y nos. Gijón. 1989.
- Versos para Ana sin número. Oviedo. 1989.
- La edad del saúco. Mieres.1991.
- En presente (y poemas de Álbum amarillo). Gijón. 1991.
- La hora de las gaviotas. Huelva. 1992.
- Vengo del norte. Rialp. Madrid. 1993.
- Nadie responde. El Ferrol. 1994.
- (Ed.) La muerte tiene llave. Fíbula. Avilés. 1994.
- (Ed.) Con los cinco sentidos. Fíbula. Avilés. 1997.
- (Ed.) Las señas del perseguidor. Fíbula. Avilés 1999.
- Nada. Ed. Deva. Gijón. 2001.
- 34 (Poemes a imaxe del silenciu), Oviedo. 2003.
- Tocata y Fuga. Alvízoras Llibros. Oviedo. 2004.
- (Ed.) Una realidad aparte. Fíbula. Avilés. 2005.
- El poema que cayó a la mar. Pintar-Pintar. Oviedo. 2007.
- Chispina. Pintar-Pintar. Oviedo. 2008.
- Caracol. Pintar-Pintar. Oviedo. 2008.
- Esta luz tan breve (Poesía 1988-2008). Saltadera. Oviedo. 2008.
- El cantu’l tordu. ALLA. Oviedo. 2009.
- Todo ama. Pintar-Pintar. Oviedo. 2009.
- (Ed.) NO. Fíbula. Avilés. 2009.
- Mi madre. Pintar-Pintar. Oviedo. 2010
- Loles. Pintar-Pintar. Oviedo. 2011
- Versonajes. Pintar-Pintar. Oviedo. 2013.

== Anthologies and collective works ==
- Antología de poesía española, by José Enrique Martínez Fernández. Castalia, 1997.
- La caja de Pandora. Oviedo. 1997.
- Encuentros. Artizar. Oviedo. 1997.
- Ángel González en la generación del 50: Diálogo con los poetas de la experiencia. Tribuna Ciudadana. Oviedo. 1998.
- Preface of El color del aire, by José Manuel Gutiérrez. Olifante. 1999.
- Toles direcciones /Todas direcciones (Luis Salcines ed.). Asturias-Santander.2001.
- Sixth anthology of Adonais. Rialp Edicions, S.A. Madrid. 2004.
- Coordination of the work II Concurso de Cuentos y I de Poesía "PUMUO". University of Oviedo. 2004.
- Poesía asturiana contemporánea. Palabres clares. Trabe. Oviedo. 2005.
- Poesía Astur de hoy. Zigurat. Hungría-Ateneo Obrero de Gijón. 2005.
- La hamaca de lona. Málaga. 2006.
- Al aldu. Poesía para el segundo ciclo de ESO. 2005.
- Exhibition catalog El aire también muere by Elisa Torreira. Pamplona. 2005.
- Poesía para vencejos. León. 2007.
- Una vida para la literatura. Gijón. 2007.
- Se envellecemos xuntos. El Ferrol. 2007.
- Vida de perros. Poemas perrunos. Buscarini. Logroño. 2007.
- Anthology of short stories Dir pa escuela. Ámbitu, Oviedo. 2008.
- Exhibition catalog El arte del retrato, painting collection Masaveu. Sociedad Anónima Tudela Veguín. Oviedo. 2008.
- El paisaje literario. University of Las Palmas de Gran Canaria. 2009.
- Abrazos de náufrago. Huelva. 2009.
- Poetas asturianos para el siglo XXI by Carlos Ardavín. Trea. 2009.
- Trabanco (Premio Alfredo Quirós Fernández). Gijón. 2009.
- Poetas de Asturias en Cangas de Onís. Santander. 2009.
- Por partida doble. Poesía asturiana actual. Trabe. Oviedo. 2009.
- Toma de tierra. Poetas en lengua asturiana. Antología (1975-2010). Trea. Gijón. 2010.
- Anthology Alrededor de Luis Alberto de Cuenca. Neverland. 2011.
- Se envellecemos xuntos. Galebook. 2013.
- Contra'l silenciu by Berto García. Suburbia Ediciones S.L., Gijón. 2014.

== Contributions to newspapers and magazines ==
- Regular contributor to the journal El Periòdico de Quirós since 2001
- Contributor to the cultural supplement La nueva Quintana in the newspaper La Nueva España.
- Opinion columnist in the newspaper La Nueva España (La Rucha section) since 2006.
- Opinion columnist in the newspaper La Voz de Asturias (La Rueda section) since 2007 to 2012.
- Contributions of literary criticism in several national and international magazines: Sibila, Otro lunes, Lunas Rojas, Arquitrave, MicRomania, Ágora, Il Convivio, etc.
