= María Elvira Lacaci =

Spanish poet

- Born: María Elvira Lacaci Morris; 1916; Ferrol, Spain
- Died: 9 March 1997 (aged 80–81); Madrid, Spain

María Elvira Lacaci Morris (1916–1997) was a Spanish Galician poet. She was the first woman to win the Premio Adonáis de Poesía.

== Biography ==
Lacaci was born in Ferrol in Galicia to a family of mariners. She was married to the novelist Miguel Buñuel. In 1952, she took up residence in Madrid and began writing and publishing poetry.

Lacaci received a somewhat limited literary education which may have contributed to the intuitiveness of her writing. Much of Lacaci's poetry is based on personal and subjective experiences. Despite her grouping with social realism poets of the 1950s, much of her writing centres on religious themes and is devoutly Christian in tone. Her first published poetry collection, Humana Voz (1957, Human Voice) contrasts urban scenes with the presence of a benevolent God. Another of Lacaci's works, Sonido de Dios (1962, The Sound of God), explores the poetic persona's relationship with God.

Lacaci died in her residence in Madrid on 9 March 1997.

== Awards and honours ==
Lacaci won the Adonais Prize in 1956 (the first woman to receive it) for Voz humana (1957, Human Voice) and the Premio de la Crítica de poesía castellana in 1964.

== Works ==
=== Poetry ===
- Humana voz (1957)
- Sonido de Dios (1962)
- Al este de la ciudad (1963)
- Molinillo de papel (1967)
- Tom y Jim (1966)
- El rey Baltasar (1965)
- Molinillos de papel (1967)

=== Stories ===
- La instancia (1967)
- Pequeño bazar
