= Francisco Brines =

Spanish poet (1932–2021)

The Most Excellent Francisco Brines
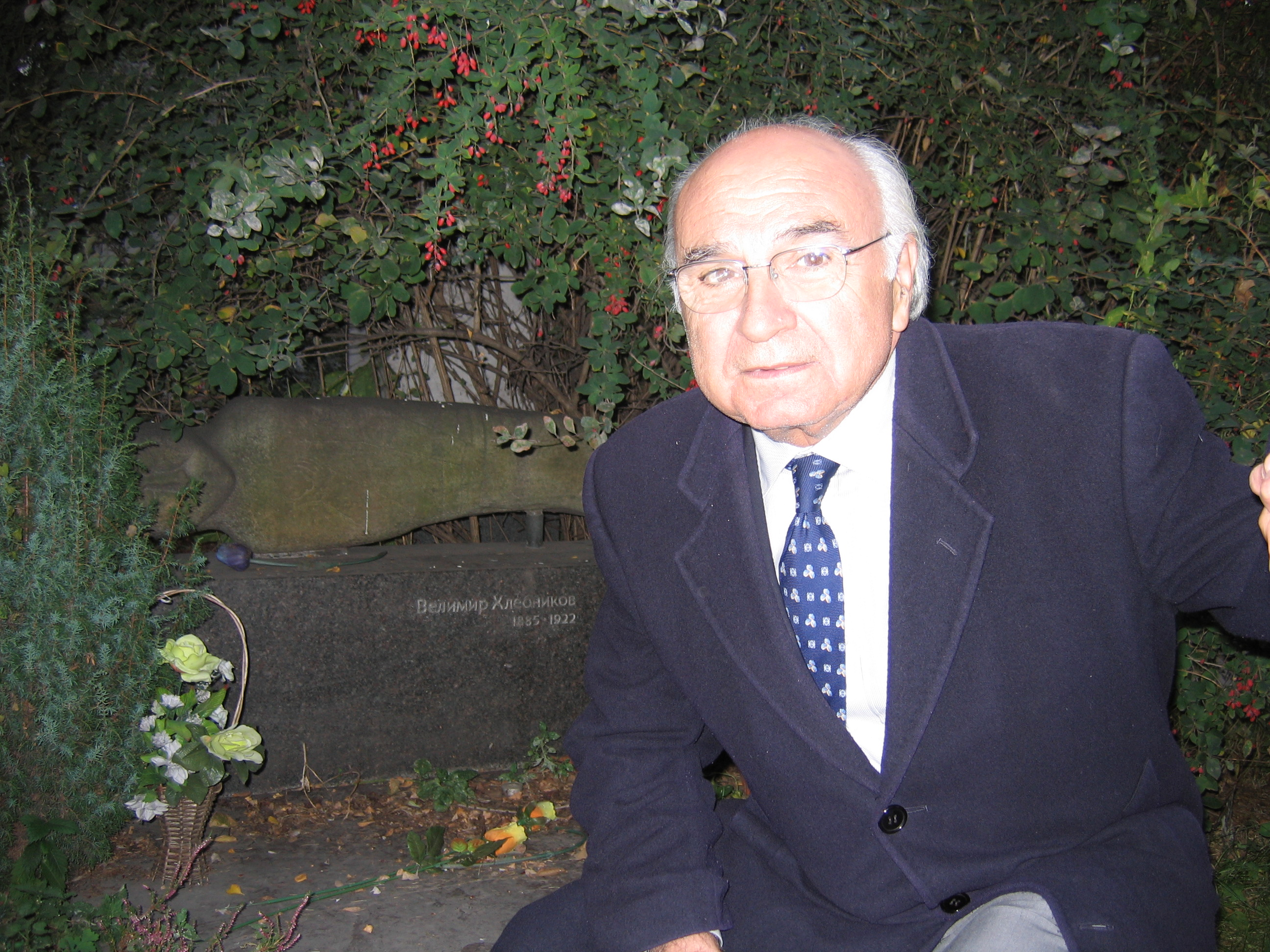
- Born: Francisco Brines Bañó; 22 January 1932; Oliva (Valencia), Spain
- Died: 20 May 2021 (aged 89); Gandía (Valencia), Spain
- Writing career
- Genre: Poetry
- Literary movement: Generation of '50

Seat X of the Real Academia Española
- In office 21 May 2006 – 20 May 2021
- Preceded by: Antonio Buero Vallejo
- Succeeded by: Clara Sánchez

Francisco Brines Bañó (22 January 1932 – 20 May 2021) was a Spanish poet.

== Biography ==
Brines was born in Oliva (Valencia). He is regarded as one of the Generation of '50 of Spanish poets, along with Claudio Rodríguez, Jaime Gil de Biedma and Ángel González.

His poetry collections include: Las brasas (1960), Palabras a la oscuridad (1966), Aún no (1971), Insistencias en Luzbel (1977), El otoño de las rosas (1986) and La última costa (1995). His collected poems Ensayo de una despedida were published in 1997.

He won numerous prizes including the Crítica Prize (1966), the National Poetry Prize (1986), the Fastenrath Award (1998), the Federico García Lorca Prize (2007) and the Premio Reina Sofía de Poesia Iberoamericana (2011). He won the prestigious Premio Nacional de las Letras Españolas in 1999. Brines was elected to Seat X of the Real Academia Española on 19 April 2001, he took up his seat on 21 May 2006. He was elected to the seat vacated by Antonio Buero Vallejo. In 2020 he won the Premio Cervantes, the most important literary award of the Spanish language world.

He taught Spanish literature at Oxford University and Cambridge University. He lived in his native Oliva.

Brines died on 20 May 2021, aged 89, at his home after being admitted to the hospital for a few days for a hernia operation.
