= José García Nieto =

Spanish poet and writer

The Most Excellent José García Nieto
- Born: 6 July 1914; Oviedo, Spain
- Died: 27 February 2001 (aged 86); Madrid, Spain
- Relatives: Bárbara Santa-Cruz (granddaughter)

Seat i of the Real Academia Española
- In office 13 March 1983 – 27 February 2001
- Preceded by: José María Pemán
- Succeeded by: Margarita Salas

José García Nieto (Oviedo, 6 July 1914 – Madrid, 27 February 2001) was a Spanish poet and writer. In 1996, he was awarded the Miguel de Cervantes Prize. Along with Gabriel Celaya, Blas de Otero and José Hierro, he was a member of the post-war generation of Spanish poets.

== Biography ==
José García Nieto was born in Oviedo, on 6 July 1914, at 8, la calle Portugalete (now, 6 Melquíades Álvarez). His parents were José García Lueso and María de La Encarnación Nieto Fernández.

In 1950, he won the Premio Adonáis for Dama de soledad; in 1955 he won the Premio Fastenrath awarded by the Royal Spanish Academy for Geografía es amor.

In 1951 and 1957, he won the Premio Nacional de Literatura de España; in 1980 he won the Premio Mariano de Cavia.

García Nieto was elected to seat i of the Real Academia Española, he took up his seat on 13 March 1983.

In 1987 he won Premio González-Ruano. In 1996 he won the Cervantes Prize.

== Works ==
- Víspera hacia ti (1940)
- Poesía (1944)
- Versos de un huésped de Luisa Esteban (1944)
- Tú y yo sobre la tierra (1944)
- Retablo de ángel, el hombre y la pastora (1944)
- Del campo y soledad (1946)
- Juego de los doce espejos (1951)
- Tregua (1951). Premio Nacional de Literatura
- La red (1955). Premio Fastenrath
- Geografía es amor (1956). Premio Nacional de Literatura
- El parque pequeño (1959)
- Corpus Chisti y seis sonetos (1962)
- Circunstancias de la muerte (1963)
- La hora undécima (1963)
- Memorias y compromisos (1966)
- Hablando solo (1967). Premio Ciudad de Barcelona
- Facultad de volver (1970)
- Taller de arte menor y cincuenta sonetos (1973)
- Súplica por la paz del mundo y otros "collages" (1973). Premio Boscán
- Sonetos y revelaciones de Madrid (1974)
- Los cristales fingidos (1978)
- El arrabal (1980)
- Nuevo elogio de la lengua española (1983)
- Sonetos españoles a Bolívar (1983)
- Donde el mundo no cesa de referir su historia (1983) -prosa-
- Piedra y cielo de Roma (1984)
- Carta a la madre (1988)
- Mar viviente (1989)
- El cuaderno roto (1989) -prosa-

== See also ==
- Café Gijón (Madrid)
