= Blanca Andreu =

Spanish poet (born 1959)

Blanca Andreu (born 4 August 1959 A Coruña) is a Spanish poet belonging to the Spanish literary generation known as the Generation of the '80s (Generación de los ochenta) or Postnovísimos.

== Life ==
She grew up in Orihuela, where her family still resides, and attended El Colegio de Jesus-Maria de San Agustin, followed by studies in philology in Murcia. At age 20, she moved to Madrid without formally completing her education. Here, she met Francisco Umbral, who introduced her to the literati of the city.

In 1980, she was awarded the Premio Adonáis de Poesía for her first collection of poems entitled, De una niña de provincias que se vino a vivir en un Chagall. De una niña is characterized by its surrealist language and imagery and is considered to be the beginning of a new literary generation in Spain, the Generación Postnovísima (Postnovísimo Generation), and "one of the seminal works of Spanish poetry." She continued her surrealist tendencies in her second collection, Báculo de Babel (1982), which received the Fernando Rielo World Prize for Mystic Poetry, but her later works break from the surrealist tendencies of her early pieces. According to an interview with the author, it was novelist and future husband Juan Benet who convinced her to steer away from surrealism and to "rein in the imagination and not abuse the use of metaphor."

In 1985 she married Juan Benet. After he died in 1993, she moved to Alicante and then to A Coruña where she now lives an ordinary life.

== Awards ==
- 1980: Premio Adonáis de Poesía
- 1981: Premio de Cuentos Gabriel Miró
- 1982: Premio Mundial de Poesía Mística, Fernando Rielo
- 1982: Premio Ícaro de Literatura
- 2001: Premio Internacional de Poesía Laureà Mela

== Works ==
- De una niña de provincias que se vino a vivir en un Chagall (1980)
- Báculo de Babel (1982)
- Capitán Elphistone (1988)
- El sueño oscuro (1994)
- La tierra transparente (2002)

== Critical studies ==
- "Blanca Andreu: Recovering the Lost Language", Sylvia Sherno, Hispania, Vol. 77, No. 3 (Sep., 1994), pp. 384-393
- "Between Water and Fire: Blanca Andreu's Dream Landscapes", Sylvia Sherno, Revista Hispánica Moderna, Año 47, No. 2 (Dec., 1994), pp. 533-542
- John Chapman Wilcox (1997). "Amparo Amoros, Ana rosetti, Blanca Andreu". Women poets of Spain, 1860-1990: toward a gynocentric vision. University of Illinois Press. ISBN 978-0-252-06559-0.
