= Concha Zardoya =

Chilean writer (1914–2004)

- Born: María Concepción Zardoya González; 14 November 1914; Valparaíso, Chile
- Died: 21 April 2004 (aged 89); Majadahonda, Spain
- Education: University of Madrid
- Writing career
- Pen name: Concha de Salamanca
- Genre: Poetry

María Concepción Zardoya González, also known as Concha Zardoya, (14 November 1914 – 21 April 2004) was a Chilean poet and literary critic. During her career, she published nearly 40 poetry collections and won multiple literary awards.

Born in Chile, she moved to Spain at the age of 17 and lived through the Spanish Civil War. She wrote numerous essays, children's literature, screenplays, and a biography of the poet Miguel Hernández. Some of her stories were published under the pseudonym Concha de Salamanca.

== Early life in Chile ==
María Concepción Zardoya González was born on 14 November 1914, in Valparaíso, Chile to Concepción González Ortiz and Alfonso Zardoya Francés, who were from the Spanish communities of Cantabria and Navarre. She had both osteoporosis and asthma. She graduated from Liceo nº 2 in Valparaíso in 1930.

== Emigration to Madrid ==
In 1932, when Zardoya was 17 years old, her family emigrated to Spain. They first lived in Zaragoza, then in Barcelona, before eventually settling in Madrid. She studied at the Faculty of Philosophy and Letters of the University of Madrid from 1934 to 1936 where she was a student of José Ortega y Gasset and Américo Castro. In Madrid she became acquainted with the Chilean poets Pablo Neruda and Gabriela Mistral. Her education was interrupted by the outbreak of the Spanish Civil War.

Zardoya moved to Valencia during the siege of Madrid where she studied library science. She developed an interest in Communism and leftist politics and worked at Cultura Popular, an organisation that hosted cultural events and established libraries for soldiers and workers in the war effort. She read her poetry on the radio.

== Writing career ==
Zardoya's only brother, Alfonso, died during the civil war. She started writing poetry and published her first poems in the magazine Hora de España in 1937 with the help of poet José María Quiroga Pla. She returned to Madrid after the end of the war and in the early 1940s worked as a teacher, translator, and seamstress. She taught Spanish and Spanish literature at the school Atenea de Madrid.

Zardoya continued writing, and in 1944 published her first book, Cuentos del antiguo Nilo (Tales of the Ancient Nile), using the pseudonym Concha de Salamanca. She also wrote screenplays, prologues for classic literature, and a series for youth. In 1945, she travelled to the United States to speak and translated the works of Walt Whitman.

In 1946 she published Pájaros del Nuevo Mundo, her first poetry collection. In 1947, she published Dominio del llanto. She wrote a screenplay about Francisco Goya and published compilations of Hispanic stories and legends. In addition to the works of Whitman, Zardoya translated the writings of Charles Langbridge Morgan.

Zardoya returned to school as a free student and earned a degree in modern philology in 1947. Her 1947 poetry collection Dominios del llanto was runner-up for the Premio Adonáis de Poesía.

== Teaching in the United States ==
Zardoya moved to the United States in 1948 and she also received a doctorate from the University of Illinois Urbana-Champaign. Her dissertation was on the Spanish image in American poetry. She went on to teach at Tulane University in 1951, and later at multiple North American universities, including Yale University, Indiana University Bloomington and University of California, Berkeley. She was awarded a First Honorable Mention at the Premio Catá de Cuentos in Havana in 1949.

Zardoya was friends with poet Miguel Hernández and wrote a biography of him titled Miguel Hernández. Vida y obra. Bibliografía. Antología in 1955. That same year she won the Boscán Poetry Prize for her poetry collection Debajo de la luz. During her career, Zardoya published nearly 40 poetry collections.

She dedicated herself to essay writing from 1966 to 1974, focusing on Spanish and American literature. She wrote up Spanish-language survey of American literature as well as surveys of modern Spanish poetry. She regularly wrote for cultural magazines and published books on contemporary Spanish poetry and the history of North American literature.

== Retirement and later life ==
Zardoya retired in 1977 and returned to Spain where she continued to write poetry. In 1980, Zardoya chaired the Association of Friends of Miguel Hernández and won the Café Marfil Poetry Prize with her book Ritos, cifras y evasiones.

Zardoya's poetry was thematically diverse, sometimes reflecting on social and ethical behaviors. Her poetry collections sometimes revolved around small objects such as a fan. Her poetry collection Los ríos caudales was a tribute to the Generation of '27. She also wrote children's literature such as En la isla de Pascua (1985), Cuentos sin edad (1989), and Caramurú y la anaconda (1992). Her final poetry collection, Ronda del arco iris, included 33 short compositions dedicated to children and was published in 2004.

Zardoya died of heart failure on 21 April 2004 at her home in Majadahonda, Spain. A public library in Majadahonda is named for her.

== Awards ==
- Premio Boscán de Poesía for Debajo de la luz (1955)
- Premio Fémina de Poesía for El corazón y la sombra (1975)
- Premio Café Marfil de Poesía for Ritos, cifras, y evasiones (1980)
- Premio Ópera Óptima for Manhattan y otras latitudes (1983)
- Premio Prometeo de Poesía for Altamor (1988)

== Selected works ==
- Pájaros del Nuevo Mundo (1946)
- Dominios del llanto (1947)
- Los signos (1954)
- El desterrado ensueño (1955)
- Miguel Hernández. Vida y obra. Bibliografía. Antología (1955)
- El desterrado ensueño (1955)
- Mirar al cielo es tu condena (1957)
- La casa deshabitada (1959)
- Elegías (1961)
- Corral de vivos y muertos (1965)
- Hondo sur (1968)
- Poesía española del siglo XX (1974)
- El corazón y la sombra (1977)
- Manhattan y otras latitudes (1983)
- Retorno a Magerit (1983)
- En la isla de Pascua (1985)
- Ritos, cifras, y evasiones (1985)
- No llega a ser ceniza lo que arde (1985)
- Altamor (1986)
- Retorno a Magerit (1986)
- Cuentos sin edad (1989)
- Patrimonio de ciegos (1992)
- Caramurú y la anaconda (1992)
- El don de la simiente (1993)
- Sintonimias del adiós (2002)
- Alrededores míos (2003)
- Ronda del arco iris (2004)
