= Pilar Paz Pasamar =

Spanish poet and writer (1932–2019)

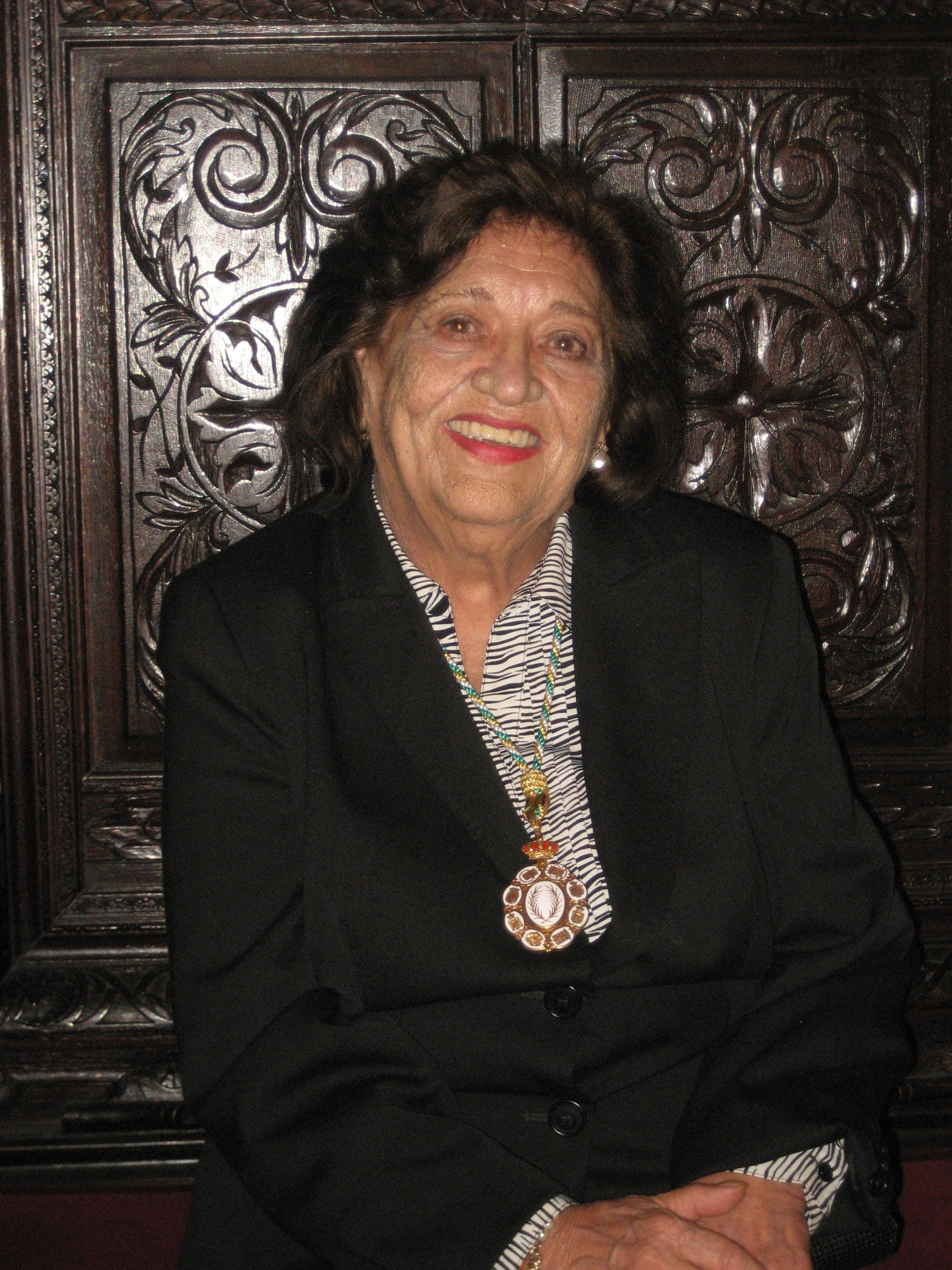
Pilar Paz Pasamar, 2012

Pilar Paz Pasamar (13 February 1932 - 7 March 2019) was a Spanish poet and writer whose work has been translated into Italian, Arabic, French, English and Chinese. She was a member of the Cádiz branch of the 1950s poetic generation. She was a member of the Real Academia Hispano Americana de Cádiz since 1963. Her awards and honors include second place from the Premio Adonáis de Poesía for "Los buenos días" (1954), Adoptive Daughter of the city of Cádiz (2005), Meridiana Prize of the Andalusian Institute of Women (2005), included in the section "Own Names" of the Instituto Cervantes, and Author of the Year by the Andalusian Center of Letters of the Junta de Andalucía (2015). The city council of her hometown annually awards the Pilar Paz Pasamar Prize for short stories and poetry by women.

== Early life ==
Pilar Paz Pasamar was born in Jerez de la Frontera, 13 February 1932. Her father was Arturo Paz Varela, an infantry captain of Jerez. Her mother was Pilar Pasamar Mingote, a zaragozana who left the profession of lyrical singer when she married Arturo. Her siblings included Mercedes (b. 1927), Arturo (b. 1933) and Jorge Antonio (b. 1943).

After the Spanish Civil War, the family settled in Madrid, where the daughters were enrolled in the Carmelites school on Fortuny Street. But the family spent holidays in the south, where the Paz's poetic sensibility around three stimuli were developed: the lyric of oral tradition (very much alive in Lower Andalusia), the songs she heard on the radio, and the poems of Las mil mejores poesías that her mother taught her to recite.

== Career ==
=== 1940s-1956 ===
Between 1947 and 1948, Paz wrote a "poetic corner" in the newspaper Ayer de Jerez. In her first works, there are similarities to poems written by Gustavo Adolfo Bécquer, Rubén Darío, Antonio Machado, and Juan Ramón Jiménez. Her poems evolved as she made literary friendships in her native Jerez with Juan Valencia and, above all, José Manuel Caballero Bonald, who became her first poetic mentor in Madrid circles.

From 1950, coinciding with the inauguration of the Summer Courses for Foreigners in Cádiz, Paz joined the group that published the magazine Platero (1950-1954), composed of Fernando Quiñones, Felipe Sordo Lamadrid, Serafín Pro Hesles, Francisco Pleguezuelo, and the painter Lorenzo Cherbuy. With them, she went to Córdoba in 1951 to meet the poets of the “Canticle” group: Pablo García Baena, Ricardo Molina Tenor, and Juan Bernier. Platero published collaborations of Juan Ramón Jiménez, Rafael Alberti, Pedro Salinas, Vicente Aleixandre, and Gerardo Diego. The Cadiz group included other poets from the province, such as José Manuel Caballero Bonald, Julio Mariscal, and José Luis Tejada.

In 1952, Paz enrolled in the Faculty of Philosophy and Letters of Complutense University of Madrid, although she did not finish the degree. There, she studied with other literary figures such as Dámaso Alonso and Carlos Bousoño.

Between 1951 and 1956, she published three books that would make her the youngest and most celebrated poet of the moment. Mara (1951), Los buenos días (1954, second prize of the 1953 Adonais award), and Ablativo amor (1955, Youth Award).

Paz became integrated into the feminine poetic circles of Carmen Conde Abellán, Ángela Figuera, Gloria Fuertes, Concha Lagos. Carmen Conde included Paz in all her anthologies, and years later, she occupied a prominent place in the Italian-Spanish bilingual anthology prepared by Maria Roman Colangeli (1964). Paz's works, Del abreviado mar (1957) and Violencia inmóvil (1967) appeared in the collection "Agora" edited by Concha Lagos.

In those same years, Paz had a passion for the theater. In the Complutense University of Madrid, she related to students who were part of the TEU (Spanish University Theater), including Marcelo Arroitia, Jaime Ferrán, and José María Saussol Prieto. With them, she set up an adaptation of William Shakespeare's The Tempest (Madrid, 1954). She participated in dramatized readings, and came to consider a tour of Italy with La Celestina . Together with José María Rodríguez Méndez, she wrote El Desván, an unpublished comedy.

=== 1957-1967 ===
She left the university when she met Carlos Redondo Huertos. They decided to marry and settle in Cádiz. The wedding, in 1957, coincided with the publication of Paz's fourth book of poems, Del abreviado mar (1957), its title a tribute to Luis de Góngora.

In the ensuing years, Paz was mainly dedicated to her family. Her four children were born in Cádiz: Pilar (1958), Mercedes (1960), María Eugenia (1963) and Arturo (1967). However, she published La soledad contigo in 1960. On 12 August 1963 she made a speech at the Royal Hispanic-American Academy of Sciences, Arts and Letters of Cádiz where she reflected on the role of the poet.

In 1967, she published Violencia inmóvil, the best poems by the author so far.

=== From 1982 ===
Fifteen years passed in the midst of major changes in the world, in Spain, and in Paz's family environment. She published La torre de Babel y otros asuntos in 1982, a book written following a strong personal crisis where confrontation with personal failure and the current world converge in the Tower of Babel as a central symbol of destruction of the word. It was the reappearance of Paz, the poet.

The author, until then isolated in Cádiz, slowly returned to the literary context through three movements related to postmodernism and democracy: Andalusian literature, the boom of female writing in the 1980s, and the poetry of in the tradition of José Ramón Ripoll. In the same year, 1986, Pilar reappeared with Litoral femenino, and in the anthology that José Ramón Ripoll prepared for his work, La alacena (1986).

The 1990s inaugurated a period of expansion. In 1990, Textos lapidarios, was published. Two storybooks: Historias balnearias y otras (1999) and Historias bélicas (2004) followed. She also wrote for Diario de Cádiz with the column "La Hache intercalada". Philomena (1994) and Sophía (2003) were a peak in the lyric work of the author.

=== Later life ===
Her last poetic installment was Los niños interiores (2008), and she published Marinera en tierra adentro in 2013. Paz died in Cádiz, March 7, 2019.

== Selected works ==
=== Poetry ===
- Mara, Madrid, Impr. Altamira, 1951. Prólogo de Carmen Conde.
- Los buenos días, Madrid, Rialp, Col. Adonais, 1954. Accésit del Premio Adonáis.
- Ablativo amor, Barcelona, Atzavara, 1955. Premio Juventud.
- Del abreviado mar, Madrid, Col. Ágora, 1957.
- La soledad, contigo, Arcos de la Fra. (Cádiz), Col. Alcaraván, 1960.
- Violencia inmóvil, Madrid, Col. Ágora, 1963.
- La torre de Babel y otros asuntos, Cádiz, Col. Torre Tavira, 1982. Prólogo de Carlos Muñiz Romero.
- La alacena, selección y estudio preliminar de José Ramón Ripoll, Jerez, Diputación de Cádiz, Col. Arenal, 1986.
- Philomena, Sevilla, Fundación El Monte, 1994. Premio de Poesía Mística Fernando Rielo
- Opera lecta, Prólogo de Cecilia Belmar Hip, Selección de Manuel Francisco Reina, Madrid, Visor, 2001.
- Sophía, Sevilla, Ed. Distrito del Sur & Ayuntamiento de Sevilla, col. Ángaro, 2003. Prólogo de José María Balcells.
- El río que no cesa, Selección de la autora, prólogo de Mauricio Gil Cano, Jerez de la Fra. (Cádiz), EH Editores, Col. Hojas de Bohemia nº 10, 2007. Epílogo de Manuel Francisco Reina. Incluye un CD con poemas recitados por la autora.
- Los niños interiores, Madrid, Calambur, 2008. Col. Poesía, nº 84. I Premio de Poesía Andaluza “El Público lee” de Canal Sur, en 2008.
- Ave de mí, palabra fugitiva (Poesía 1951-2008), Ed. y estudio preliminar (“Huésped de mi sonido más profundo: la poesía de Pilar Paz Pasamar”) de Ana Sofía Pérez-Bustamante Mourier, Cádiz, Fundación Municipal de Cultura & Diputación Provincial de Cádiz, 2013.

=== Short stories ===
- Historias balnearias y otras, Cádiz, Fundación Municipal de Cultura, col. Calembé, 1999.
- Historias bélicas, Sevilla, Algaida, 2004.
- Marinera en tierra adentro, Ed. y notas de María del Mar López-Cabrales, Cádiz, Presea, 2012.

=== Essays, conferences, articles ===
- Poética y poesía, Madrid, Cultura Hispánica, 1964. Discurso de ingreso en la Real Academia Hispano Americana de Cádiz. Contestación de José María Pemán.
- Poesía femenina de lo cotidiano, Madrid, Editora Nacional, 1964.
- “Vida y palabra debida”, en El placer de la escritura, Cádiz, Universidad] & Fundación El Monte & Fundación Municipal de la Mujer, 2005, pp. 19-39.
- La Hache intercalada, Cádiz, Diario de Cádiz & Fundación Municipal de la Mujer, 2005.
- “Poética”, en Sharon K. Ugalde (Ed.), En voz alta. Las poetas de las generaciones de los 50 y los 70, Madrid, Hiperión, 2007, pp. 393-395.

=== Anthologies ===
- Poesía rediviva de José María Pemán, Cádiz, Caja de Ahorros, 1985.
- Poesía viva de José María Pemán, Cádiz, Diario de Cádiz, 1993.

=== Theater ===
- La tempestad de William Shakespeare. Adaptación de Pilar Paz Pasamar, Madrid, 1954.
- “El desván” (1953), en colaboración con José María Rodríguez Méndez. Pieza seleccionada para el Certamen Nacional de Teatro del Reina Victoria, que finalmente no se representó y quedó inédita.
- “Campanas para una ciudad”. Inédita. En versión musical de Alberto González fue estrenada en Cádiz, el día de Andalucía de 1987, por el grupo juvenil de teatro Bahía 22.

=== Discography ===
- Así canta nuestra tierra por sevillanas, vol. I, Madrid, Ediciones Musicales Harmony & Caja de Ahorros de Jerez, 1985.
- Así canta nuestra tierra por sevillanas, vol. II, Madrid, Caja de Ahorros de Jerez, 1987.
