= Inés Fernández-Ordóñez =

Spanish philologist and academic

The Most Excellent Inés Fernández-Ordóñez
- Born: Inés Rosa Fernández-Ordóñez Hernández; 17 December 1961 (age 64); Madrid, Spain

Seat P of the Real Academia Española
- Incumbent
- Assumed office 13 February 2011
- Preceded by: Ángel González Muñiz

Inés Rosa Fernández-Ordóñez Hernández (Madrid, 17 December 1961) is a Spanish philologist and academic at the Royal Spanish Academy. The main focus of her studies are the rural dialects of the Spanish language, especially their morphology and syntax.
