= Javier de Bengoechea =

Spanish poet

Javier de Bengoechea (20 August 1919 – 12 April 2009) was a Spanish poet. He was born in Bilbao, Spain. He won the Adonais Prize in 1955 with Hombre en forma de elegía (Man in the Form of an Elegy). Other works of the author are Habitada claridad (Clear Habitat, 1951), Fiesta nacional (Public Holiday, 1951) and Pinturas y escrituras (Painting and Writings, 1994).
