= Justo Jorge Padrón =

Spanish writer (1943–2021)

- Born: 1 October 1943
- Died: 11 April 2021
- Occupations: Poet, opinion writer, translator
- Awards: Golden Wreath (1990)

Justo Jorge Padrón (1 October 1943 – 11 April 2021) was a Spanish poet, essayist, and translator. His work has been described as confirming "[t]he strength of modern Canarian poetry".

== Biography ==
He was born in Las Palmas de Gran Canaria in 1943. After studying law, philosophy, and literature at the University of Barcelona, he returned in 1967 to his native city, where for seven years he practiced law. During this time he published his first poems and entered into contact with other young Spanish poets. In 1968 he was included by José Agustín Goytisolo in his anthology New Spanish Poetry. In 1974 he abandoned the law to devote himself entirely to poetry. Two years later he was selected by the foreign ministry and the Institute of Hispanic Culture to tour Latin America as a representative of the new generation of Spanish poetry. In 1979 he represented Spain at the fourth World Congress of Poets in South Korea and at the first Festival of European Poetry in Leuven. Jorge Padrón's work has been translated into more than thirty languages, and he was himself a translator who specialized in Scandinavian languages.

He died in Madrid from COVID-19 on 11 April 2021 at the age of 77 during the COVID-19 pandemic in Spain.

== Awards ==
During his life, he received numerous literary prizes including the Premio Adonais (1971), the International Prize of the Swedish Academy (1972), the Premio Boscán (1973), the Fastenrath Prize of the Royal Spanish Academy (1976), the European Prize for Literature (1986), the Premio Orfeo (1992), the Premio Canarias (1997), and the Senghor Poetry Prize (2003). In the 1990s he was nominated for a seat in the Royal Spanish Academy, but was unsuccessful in securing one.

== Works ==
=== Poetry ===
- Trazos de un paréntesis (1965)
- Escrito en el agua (1966)
- Los oscuros fuegos (1971)
- Mar de la noche (1973)
- Los círculos del infierno (1976)
- El abedul en llamas (1978)
- Otesnita (1979)
- La visita del mar (1984)
- Los dones de la tierra (1988)
- Antología poética, 1971-1988 (1988)
- Sólo muere la mano que te escribe (1989)
- Los rostros escuchados (1989)
- Resplandor del odio (1993)
- Manantial de las presencias (1994)
- Oasis de un cosmos (1994)
- Ascuas del nadir (1995)
- El fuego en el diamante. Sonetos (1995–1998)
- El bosque de Nemi (1995–1999)
- Rumor de la agonía (1996)
- Lumbre de hogar (1996–2000)
- Escalofrío (1999)
- Cien poemas de amor (2000)
- Memoria del fuego. Poesía completa, 1965-2000 (2000)
- Hespérida. Canto universal de las Islas Canarias (2005)
- Hespérida II. La gesta colombina (2008)
- Hespérida III (2010)

=== Essays ===
- La nueva poesía sueca (1972)
- La poesía contemporánea noruega (1973)
- El modernismo en la poesía sueca (1973)
- Panorama de la narrativa islandesa contemporánea (1974)
- La poesía nórdica de la posguerra (1974)
- La poesía española desde la posguerra (1980)
