= Beatriz Hernanz =

Spanish poet and critic

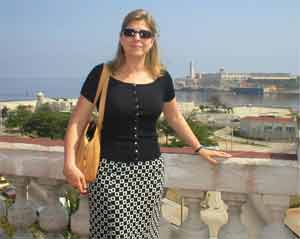
Beatriz Hernanz

Beatriz Hernanz is Spanish poet and critic. She was born in Pontevedra (Spain) in 1963.

== Early life ==
She has a Ph.D. in Hispanic philology from Complutense University of Madrid (UCM). She earned a master's degree in education from the Faculty of Education at UCM. She won a Stevenson Grant to study graduate courses at University or Edinburgh. She has combined her teaching and critical work with cultural and Educational Management, as well as creative writing. She teaches at various British and American universities, as well as she has worked as Academic Director, in ESADT in Torrelodones, at the University of Kent.

== Career ==
As a Cultural and Educational Manager, she held positions in the CNTC, (Spanish National Theater Company) and was Director of Centro de Documentación Teatral/Spanish National Theater Documentation Centre, CDT (Ministry of Education and Culture of Spain) and General Coordinator Management of the 1898 Centennial Commission. In more than three decades working in Educational Cooperation with Latin America, developing Academic Leadership in the Endesa Programme of Cultural Heritage Scholarship, with Fundación Endesa and Ministry of Education and Culture of Spain.

In 2004 she became executive director, Grants Program, at Fundación Carolina, (Ministry of Foreign Affairs of Spain) directing several areas : Arts and Humanities, Infrastructures, Engineering and Technologies. Actually she is Director of Culture at Instituto Cervantes.

She was a regular contributor to summer courses at Spanish universities, including UCM and UIMP. She was guest Lecturer at Europe and Latin American universities and cultural institutions. She is a literary critic at Spanish journals, including Cultural ABC (1992–1998) and El Cultural of El Mundo (1998–2008); actually in Babelia, El País.

She has participated as a representative of Spain in educational and cultural forums of the Council of Europe. She published articles and essays on Spanish Literature, especially classical and contemporary theater. She made Spanish translations of poets such as Montale, E.E. Cummings, Wisława Szymborska and Mario Quintana.

She is a member of the Edition Board of the poetry magazine Revista Áurea and is a member of AIH y ACE. As a poet, she published six books and received international poetry awards. She appears in anthologies and literary magazines, as well as in internet reviews.

== Poetry books ==
- La lealtad del espejo. Albacete, Barcarola, 1993. Winner Prize VIII Certamen Internacional de poesía BARCAROLA (1992). Prologued by Francisco Umbral.
- La vigilia del tiempo. Winner Prize Accesit del premio Adonais de poesía, 1995. Madrid, Rialp, 1996.
- La epopeya del laberinto. Palma de Mallorca, Calima, 2001.
- La piel de las palabras. Palma Mallorca, Calima, 2005. Prologued by José Manuel Caballero Bonald.
- Los volcanes sin sueño. Madrid, Polibea, Colección Los Conjurados, 2011.
- A Pelegrina do vento. Toledo, Lastura, 2013. (Anthology in Galeguian language)
