= Roberto Sosa (poet) =

Honduran author and poet (1930–2011)

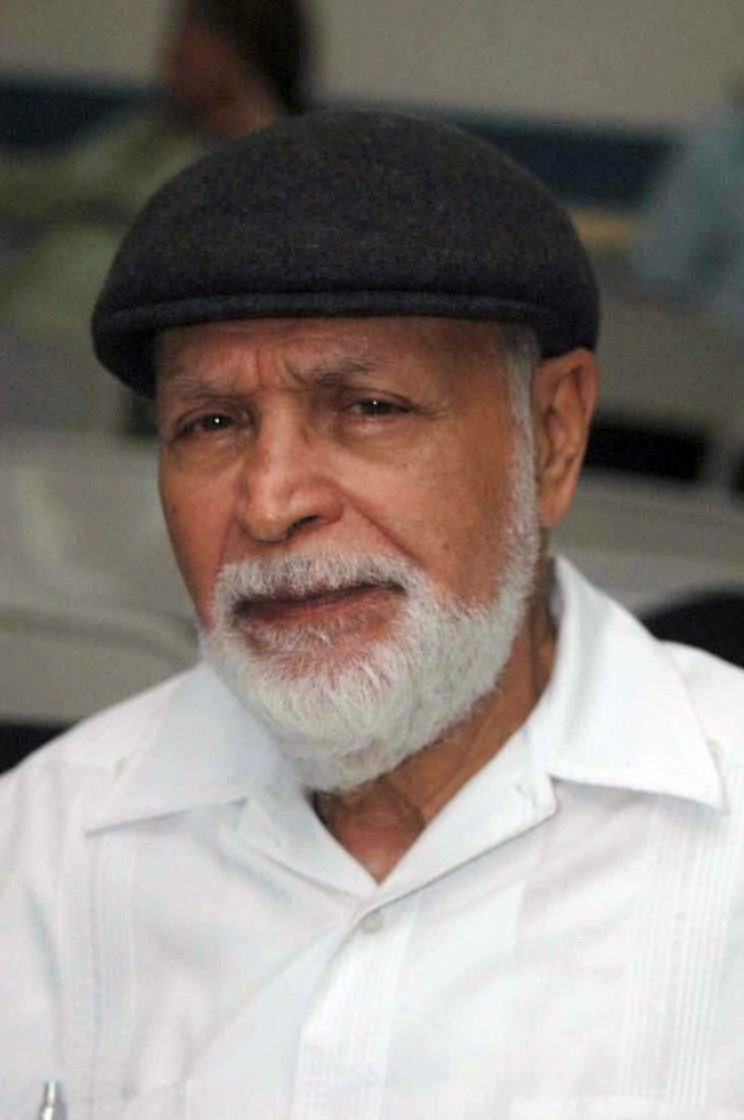
- Born: 18 April 1930; Yoro, Honduras
- Died: 23 May 2011 (aged 81)
- Occupations: Author; poet
- Writing career
- Notable awards: Premio Adonáis de Poesía (1968)

Roberto Sosa (18 April 1930 – 23 May 2011) was a Honduran author and poet born in Yoro, Honduras. He spent his early life working hard to help provide for his poor family. He published his first book when he was almost thirty years old.

At the time of his death, Sosa lived in Tegucigalpa, the capital city of Honduras. He was the editor of a magazine, Presente, and the president of the Honduras Journalists’ Union. He also taught literature at the Universidad Nacional Autónoma de Honduras.

== Early life and education ==
Sosa was born in Yoro, Honduras, on 18 April 1930, but his family left the city when he was three years old due to his father’s work as a musician, travelling throughout Honduras and El Salvador. During this period, he learned to read and write with the help of his mother while working from an early age to support his family, including selling bread to plantation workers.

He was eventually able to attend school and discovered poetry in the fifth grade through a handwritten anthology provided by a teacher, which included works by Rubén Darío, Amado Nervo, and Juan Ramón Molina. Although he was later denied a scholarship for secondary education during a period of dictatorship and political repression, he continued his studies independently.

== Literary career ==
Sosa moved to Tegucigalpa in search of intellectual circles and worked as a teacher, journalist, and editor while pursuing poetry as his primary vocation. His first poetry collection, Caligramas, was published in 1959 and focused primarily on themes of love; it includes one of his most frequently anthologised poems, Submarina.

He served as editor and director of the cultural magazine Presente from 1966 to 1987, playing a key role in promoting Central American literature and the arts.

Sosa published Los Pobres in 1969, which won the Adonais Prize in Spain. Un Mundo Para Todos Dividido, published in 1971, won the Casa de las Americas Prize in Cuba. By 1990, he had published six books of poetry, three of prose, and two anthologies of Honduran literature. In 1990, he published Obra Completa (Complete Works).

The Difficult Days, Poems, The Common Grief, and The Return of the River have all been translated into English.

== Themes and style ==
Sosa’s poetry is widely regarded as one of the most rigorous and socially engaged bodies of work in Honduran literature, frequently addressing poverty, political violence, injustice, and the lives of marginalized communities in Central America. His work is characterized by concise language, vivid imagery, and a restrained but powerful emotional tone, often avoiding rhetorical excess.

Recurring themes in his poetry include social denunciation, love, solitude, fatherhood, and national identity, with the sea frequently serving as a symbol of purity and moral refuge in contrast to the corruption of urban life. His later collections, including Secreto militar (1985), directly denounced Latin American dictatorships and political repression, naming historical figures and institutions responsible for systemic violence.

== Legacy ==
Sosa is considered a central figure in post-vanguard Latin American poetry and a defining voice of Honduran social poetry, often described as a poet who gave literary form to the experiences of "the poor of the earth". His work continues to be studied and translated internationally, maintaining influence across generations of poets and scholars.

== Works ==
- 1959: Caligramas (Tegucigalpa).
- 1966: Muros (Tegucigalpa).
- 1967: Mar interior'' (Tegucigalpa).
- 1967: Breve estudio sobre la poesía y su creación
- 1968: Los pobres (Madrid).
- 1971: Un mundo para todos dividido (La Habana).
- 1981: Prosa armada
- 1985: Secreto militar
- 1987: Hasta el sol de hoy
- 1990: Obra completa
- Antología personal
- Los pesares juntos
- 1994: Máscara suelta
- 1995: El llanto de las cosas
- 2011: Antología póstuma Honduras, poesía negra, editada por el Centro Cultural de España en Tegucigalpa y SEDINAFRO
- 2016: Antología de la poesía amorosa hondureña
