= José Hierro =

Spanish poet (1922–2002)

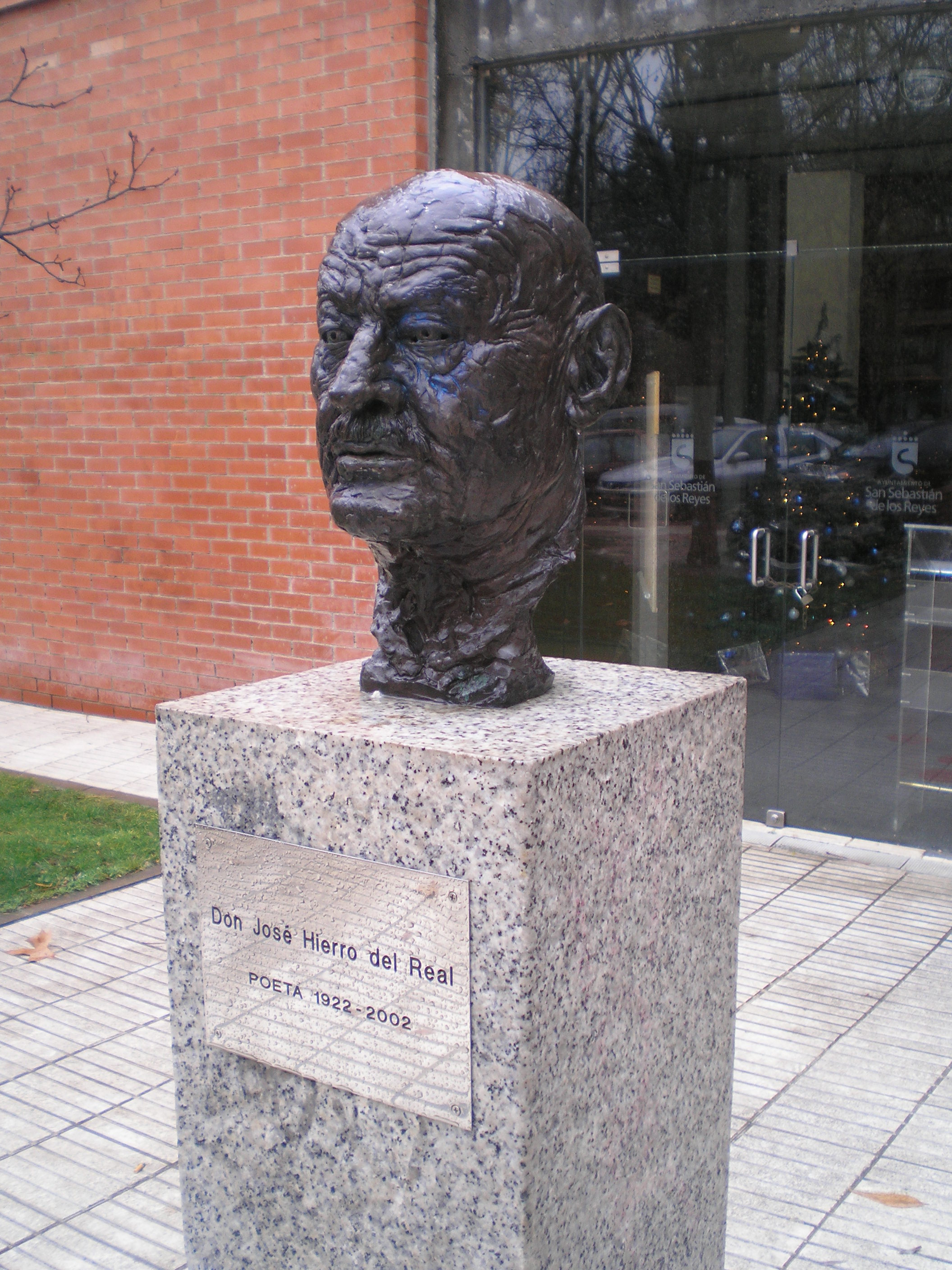
Bust of José Hierro in San Sebastián de los Reyes, Spain.

José Hierro del Real (born 3 April 1922 in Madrid, Spain – died 21 December 2002 in Madrid, Spain), sometimes colloquially called Pepe Hierro, was a Spanish poet. He belonged to the so-called postwar generation, within the rootless and existential poetry streams. He wrote for both Espadaña and Garcilaso magazines. In 1981, he received the Prince of Asturias Awards in Literature, in 1998 the Cervantes Prize and he received many more awards and honours.

== Work ==
- Alegría, M., Col. Adonáis, 1947 (Adonáis Prize 1947).
- Tierra sin nosotros, Santander, Proel, 1947.
- Con las piedras, con el viento, Santander, Proel, 1950.
- Quinta del 42, M., Editora Nacional, 1952.
- Antología, Santander, 1953 (with unpublished poems. Premio Nacional de Literatura (National Literature Prize)).
- Estatuas yacentes, Santander, Beltrán de Heredia, 1955.
- Cuanto sé de mí, M., Ágora, 1957 (Criticism Prize).
- Poesías completas. 1944-1962, M., Giner, 1962.
- Libro de las alucinaciones, M., Editora Nacional, 1964 (Criticism Prize).
- Problemas del análisis del lenguaje moral (1970).
- Cuanto sé de mí, B., Seix Barral, 1974 (Full works).
- Quince días de vacaciones (1984), prose
- Reflexiones sobre mi posía (1984), essay
- Cabotaje (1989), compilation
- Agenda, M., Prensa de la ciudad, 1991.
- Prehistoria literaria, Santander, Artes Gráficas Gonzalo Bedia, 1991.
- Emblemas neurorradiológicos (1995)
- Sonetos, Ayuntamiento de Santa María de Cayón, Cantabria, 1995 (2nd edition increased, San Sebastián de los Reyes, Universidad Popular José Hierro, 1999).
- Cuaderno de Nueva York, M., Hiperión, 1998 (Premio Nacional de Literatura).
- Guardados en la sombra, Visor, (2002)
- José Hierro. Poesías completas (1947-2002), Madrid, Visor Libros, 2009.

== Bibliography ==
- Rogers, D. M.: «El tiempo en la poesía de J. Hierro» in Archivum, No. 1-2 (November 1961), pp. 201–230;
- Jiménez, J.O.: «La poesía de J. Hierro», in Cinco poetas del tiempo (Madrid, 1972), pp. 177–326;
- Villar, A. del: «El vitalismo alucinado de J. Hierro», in Arbor, No. 349 (January 1975), pp. 67–80;
- Peña, P. J. de la: Individuo y colectividad: el caso de J. Hierro (Valencia, 1978);
- Albornoz, A. de: José Hierro (Madrid. 1981);
- González, J.M.: Poesía española de posguerra: Celaya, Otero, Hierro (1950-1960) (Madrid, 1982);
- Torre, E. E. de: José Hierro: poeta de testimonio (Madrid, 1983);
- García de la Concha, V.: «Un poeta del tiempo histórico: J. Hierro», in La poesía española de 1935 a 1975 (Madrid, 1987), volume II, pp. 632–660;
- Corona Marzol, G.: Bibliografía de José Hierro (Zaragoza, 1988) y Realidad vital y realidad poética (Poesía y poética de J. Hierro) (Zaragoza, 1991);
- V.V. A.A.: A José Hierro. Encuentros. Domingo Nicolás (Ed.) Instituto de Estudios Almerienses. (Almería, 1999);
- V.V. A.A.: Espacio Hierro. Medio siglo de creación poética de José Hierro. Juan Antonio González Fuentes and Lorenzo Olivan (Eds.) Universidad de Cantabria. (Santander, 2001)
- Vierna, Fernando de: «La leyenda del almendro» in Exordio, No. 2 (Santander, 2003).
