= Jaime Gil de Biedma =

Spanish poet (1929–1990)

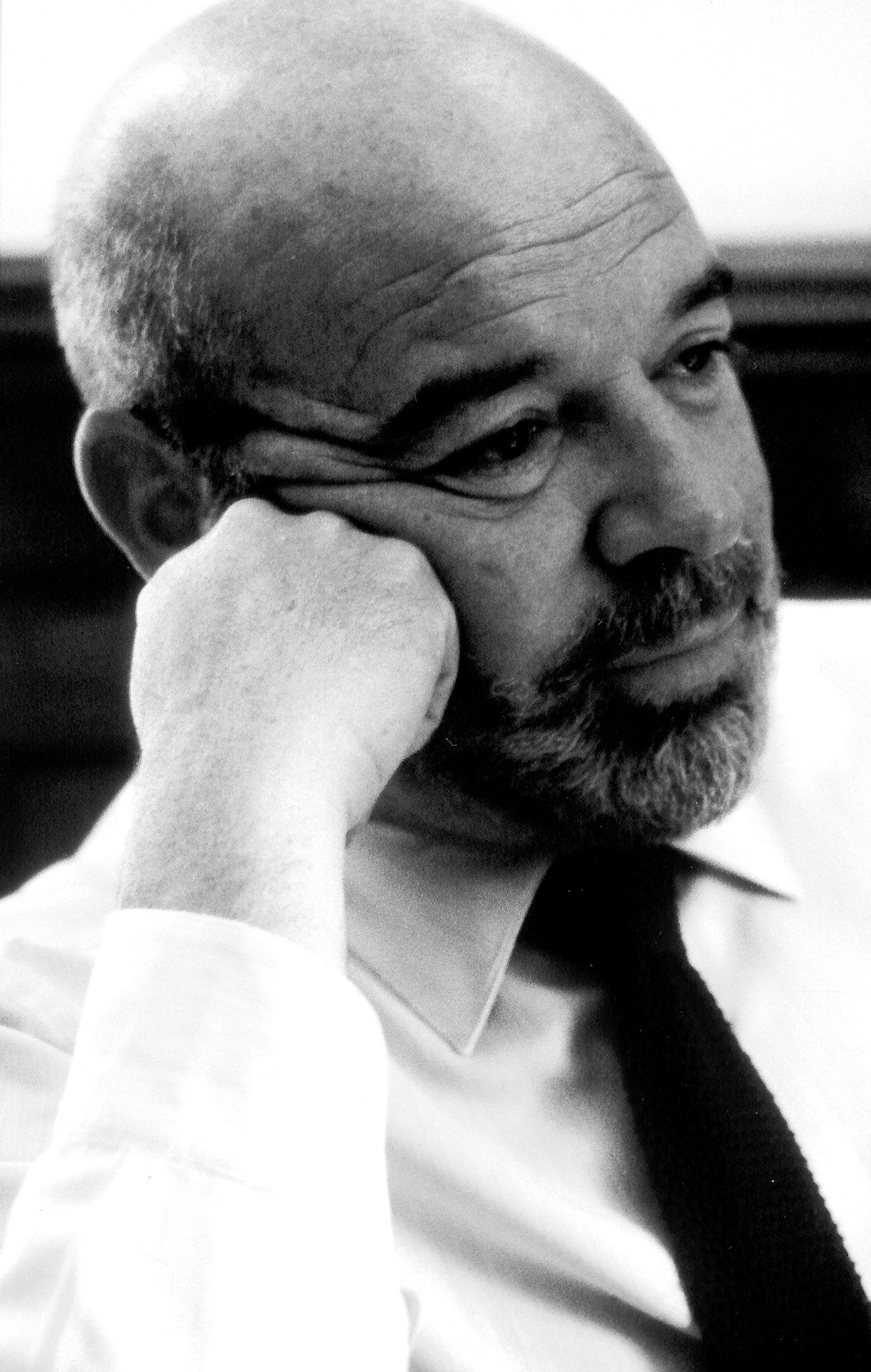
Jaime Gil de Biedma

Jaime Gil de Biedma y Alba (13 November 1929 – 8 January 1990) was a Spanish post-Civil War poet.

He was born in Nava de la Asunción on 13 November 1929. At the age of 39, he stopped writing poetry; he insisted that the character he had invented, the "poet" Jaime Gil de Biedma, as opposed to the respectable bourgeois businessman of the same name, had nothing left to say and he refused to go on playing the role of a poet in literary society.

He died on 8 January 1990 of complications due to AIDS.

== Influences ==
Gil de Biedma initíally was considerably Francophile as befitted a young Spaniard of his elevated social class, given that Spanish society had been notoriously 'afrancesada' until well into the 20th century. This state of affairs began to change under the influence of Luis Cernuda. When Gil de Biedma first read T. S. Eliot's Four Quartets, translated into Spanish in 1952, this initiated his Anglophilia; his assimilation of Anglo-American culture was consolidated by studies in Oxford in 1953. There he read T. S. Eliot for the first time in English, along with W. H. Auden and Stephen Spender. His lifelong fascination with the work of Anglo-American modernist poets made Gil de Biedma one of the most consummate Anglophiles in the field of 20th century peninsular literature. That influence is reflected in the understated, "unpretentious, yet sophisticated" style of his poetry. The long periods Gil de Biedma spent in the largely Anglophone circles of Manila would also contribute to his Anglophile literary sensibility. On numerous occasions he would declare England to be his 'segunda patria', his second country, and would also say that he was 'in great measure, a product of the Anglo-Saxon literary tradition'. Nonetheless, Gil de Biedma's poetry shows conscious relations with Spanish and French tradition, too.

== Generation of '50 ==
Poetically, Gil de Biedma belongs to the group of poets known as the "Generation of '50", a loose term referring to poets who come from the cultivated social realism in the wake of the Civil War. While earlier post-war poets focus strongly on social issues and lack attention to the poem itself, poets from Generation of '50 as Gil de Biedma, Ángel González, José Ángel Valente or Francisco Brines, while still concerned with democracy or class struggle, are aware about the literary character of their work. They all introduced in Spain, partly because of the late Cernuda's influence, what Langbaum called poetry of experience', the main poetic trend in Spain from the 1980s. In their writings from 1950 to 1970, at least, they all tried to rearrange intellectually immediate experience, by the means of a fictional-self.

== Common topics ==
In his early poems, he displays a strong criticism of Spanish dictatorship, titling his first important publication Compañeros de viaje, after a Trotskyist expression for Communist sympathizers. Gil de Biedma was known for his hard-partying ways and his unrepentant social life, and addressed the schism between public and private personae in several famous poems, arguably the most well-known being 'Contra Jaime Gil de Biedma' ('Against Jaime Gil de Biedma') or 'Después de la muerte de Jaime Gil de Biedma' ('After the death of Jaime Gil de Biedma'). Along with Francisco Brines, he helped to reinvigorate homoerotic topics on poetry, probably inspired by the exiled Luis Cernuda.

== Homosexuality ==
As a homosexual in a strongly conservative environment, Jaime Gil de Biedma was forced to lead a double life for most of his life, and he suffered discrimination and even blackmail at different times. He was rejected for membership of the then-illegal Spanish Communist Party, allegedly because Franco's dictatorship could use his sexuality to threaten him if he were discovered to be a communist. Living in Franco's Spain, being part of a conservative family and holding an important position in the Compañía General de Tabacos de Filipinas, Gil de Biedma smartly played a two-faced game: in the eyes of his family and the general public, he was a discreet and respectable executive, while, in the company of close friends and peers, he was openly gay, quick-witted and with a sharp tongue. In many ways, his poetry was a reflection of this duality, for while it very directly address themes of love, sex and the routine of romance, the gender of the loved one is never disclosed.

Referring to Gil de Biedma's poetry as "gay poetry" is a gross misconception. Even at the end of his life, he was adamant about keeping the analysis of love in his poetry neutral: in the late 80s, a journalist contacted Gil de Biedma to let him know he was doing an analysis of his poetry from the point of view of gay literature. Learning this, Gil de Biedma was terribly distressed and went to great lengths to make sure the journalist didn't go through with his plans.

== Personal life ==
Gil de Biedma's niece is the liberal conservative politician Esperanza Aguirre Gil de Biedma, former president of the Autonomous Community of Madrid and one of the main policy-makers in the Partido Popular, Spain's most important liberal-conservative party.

== Bibliography ==
- Versos a Carlos Barral (1952)
- Segun sentencia del tiempo (1953)
- Compañeros de viaje (1959)
- Moralidades (1966)
- Poemas póstumos (1969)
- Las personas del verbo (Complete Poetry -1982)
- Longing: Selected Poems (1993)

== Critical studies of Biedma ==
- Andreas Dorschel, 'Ich bin das Gedicht. Eine Entdeckung: Der Lyriker Jaime Gil de Biedma', in: Süddeutsche Zeitung no. 158 (12 July 2001), p. 16 (in German)
- Carole Viñals, Jaime Gil de Biedma: une poésie violemment vivante, Paris: L'Harmattan 2009. ISBN 978-2-296-07626-6 (in French)
