= Ángel González Muñiz =

Spanish poet

Ángel González
- Born: Ángel González Muñiz; 6 September 1925; Oviedo, Spain
- Died: 12 January 2008; Madrid, Spain

Seat P of the Real Academia Española
- In office 23 March 1997 – 12 January 2008
- Preceded by: Julio Caro Baroja
- Succeeded by: Inés Fernández-Ordóñez

Signature
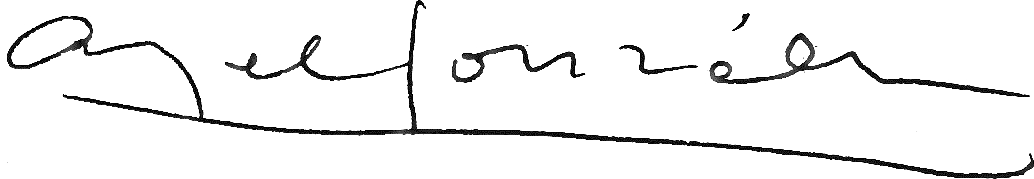

Ángel González Muñiz (6 September 1925 – 12 January 2008) was a major Spanish poet of the twentieth century.

== Biography ==
González was born in Oviedo. He took a law degree at the University of Oviedo and, in 1950, moved to Madrid to work in Civil Administration. It was in Madrid that he first began to write and publish his poetry, becoming friends with many of the leading Spanish writers who encouraged his work. His first book of poems, Áspero mundo ("Harsh World"), was an immediate critical success. His second book, Grado elemental ("Elementary Grade"), was published in Paris and won the prestigious Antonio Machado Prize for Poetry. He published eight more books of poetry and edited several anthologies and books of literary criticism, including critical editions on the poetry of Juan Ramón Jiménez and Antonio Machado. Two books have appeared in English translation: Harsh World and Other Poems (Princeton University Press, 1977, translated by Donald Walsh) and Astonishing World: The Selected Poems of Ángel González (Milkweed Editions, 1993, translated by Steven Ford Brown).

He is also the recipient of the Angel María de Lera Hispanism Prize for his contributions to Hispanic Culture from the University of Colorado (U.S.), the Príncipe de Asturias Prize (Spain), the Salerno Poetry Prize (Italy) and the Premio Reina Sofía Iberoamericas Prize (Spain). In 1997 he was appointed as the Chair of the Real Academia Española. In 2004, he was awarded the inaugural Federico García Lorca Poetry Prize by the City of Granada. His work is represented in the major anthologies of Spanish poetry of the 20th century, and is also included in the Vintage Book Of Contemporary World Poetry (Random House, 1996). He taught at the University of New Mexico from 1974 to 1994. Before his death in January 2008 in Madrid, he divided his time between New Mexico and Spain.

== Books in Spanish ==
- Aspero mundo, M., Col. Adonais, 1956.(Accésit Premio Adonáis 1955).
- Sin esperanza, con convencimiento, B., Colliure, 1961.
- Grado elemental, París, Ruedo Ibérico, 1962 (Premio Antonio Machado).
- Palabra sobre palabra, M., Poesía para todos, 1965, 1972 y 1977.
- Tratado de urbanismo, B., Col. El Bardo, 1967.
- Palabra sobre palabra, B., Seix Barral, 1968 (Poesía completa).
- Breves acotaciones para una biografía, Las Palmas de Gran Canaria, Inventarios provisionales, 1971.
- Procedimientos narrativos, Santander, La isla de los ratones, 1972.
- Muestra, corregida y aumentada, de algunos procedimientos narrativos y de las actitudes..., M., Turner, 1977.
- Prosemas o menos, 1984.
- A todo amor, 1988.
- Deixis en fantasma, M., Hiperión, 1992.
- Lecciones de cosas y otros poemas, 1998.
- 101 + 19 = 120 poemas, Madrid, Visor, 1999.
- Otoños y otras luces, B., Tusquets, 2001.
- Palabra sobre palabra, Barcelona, Seix Barral, 2005 (Poesía completa).

== Books In English translation ==
- Astonishing World, The Selected Poems of Angel Gonzalez, tr. Steven Ford Brown, Minneapolis: Milkweed Editions, 1993.
- Harsh World and Other Poems, tr. by Donald Walsh, Princeton, NJ: Princeton University Press, 1977.
- Almost All the Music, and other poems, tr. by E. A. Mares, San Antonio, TX: Wings Press, 2007.

== Anthologies ==
- Modern World Literature, Houghton Mifflin, 2001.
- Poesie Espagnole, 1945–1990, ed. Claude de Frayssine, UNESCO, 1995.
- The Vintage Anthology of Contemporary World Poetry, ed. J.D. McClatchy, Vintage/Random House, 1996.
- The Penguin Book of Spanish Verse, ed. J.M. Cohen, Penguin Books, 1988.
- Recent Poetry From Spain, ed. Louis Hammer and Sara Schyfter, Sachem Press, 1983.
- Roots & Wings: Spanish Poetry 1900-1975, ed. Hardie St. Martin, Harper & Row, 1975.
