= Fastenrath Award =

Two institutions grant the Fastenrath Awards: Fundación Premio Fastenrath awards writers of Spanish nationality and their Spanish works and Premi Fastenrath for Catalan works. Both were instituted with the posthumous legacy of Johannes Fastenrath Hürxthal.

== Background ==
Luise Goldmann (1858–1914), widow of the publicist and hispanophilian Johannes Fastenrath Hurxthal (1839–1908), at the death of her husband, who occurred in Cologne, on March 18, 1908, wanted to institute with her legacy a series of actions in favor of writers in Spanish and Catalan, having two foundations:

a. For the «Fastenrath Prize», with a founding capital of 70,000 pts. (in 1908), he conferred on King Alfonso XIII the power to proceed in the best way he considered, always under a foundation that instituted a prize for Spanish writers, with the requirement that he be named Juan Fastenrath as tribute.

b. For the "Premi Fastenrath", with a foundational capital of 14,000 pts. (in 1908), he gave the City Council of Barcelona the power to proceed in the best way he considered, instituting an award at the Floral Games in Barcelona, a literary institution closely linked with her and her late husband, with the requirement of to bear the name of Juan Fastenrath as a tribute.

== Fundación Premio Fastenrath (1909–2003) ==
=== History ===
Luise Goldmann addressed a letter to King Alfonso XIII to show the founding objective of the institution and the means it has for the economic support of the same.

In order to carry out Luise Goldmann's task, King Alfonso XIII constituted the Fastenrath Prize Foundation, on May 12, 1909, dependent on the Royal House, with a founding capital of 70,000 pts., assigning to the Spanish Royal Academy the administration of the foundation, and therefore, the faculty to submit to the monarch the proposals for the awarding of said prizes, after discussion and voting, being the monarch the one who would ultimately grant them.

In June 1935, the Fundación Premio Fastenrath became dependent on the Ministry of Public Education and Fine Arts and in September 1935 it was declared "a private charity", under the protectorate of the Government of the Republic, and administrated by the then Spanish Academy.

In a similar way to the Fastenrath Prize Foundation, the Royal Spanish Academy has been administering, on the basis of legacies instituted by individuals or private funds, a series of foundations with similar prize objectives. In mid-November 2003, it merged eleven of its dependent foundations, one of which is the "Fundación Premio Fastenrath", to form the Fundación Premios Real Academia Española.

=== Organization ===
The prize was awarded annually. It was always awarded to a work, in the Spanish language and carried out by writers of Spanish nationality, of literary or scientific creation, with the requirement that it had been published previously. Initially, the work submitted should have been published in the same year as the competition, but when it was split up and awarded in successive rounds in various forms, up to five, the number of years preceding publication also changed, so that all published works had the same opportunity to be submitted and awarded, regardless of the form of the award. In the case of the plays, in the first specific calls for entries, they had to have been premiered beforehand, a requirement that was later changed. Therefore, for the "Fastenrath Prize", the last call was for the "Fastenrath Prize 2002", awarded in 2003. The economic amount of the prize came from the income of the instituted legacy, and varied over time, from 2,000 pts. (1909–1946), 4,000 pts (1947–?), 8,000 pts. (1955, 1958), 5,000 pts. (1963), 6,000 pts (1956–1957, 1959–1962, 1964–1991), 500,000 pts (1992–1998), to 2,000,000 pts or the equivalent of €12,020 (1999–2002). It can be seen that the maintenance of the same economic endowment without any increase, twice over extremely long periods of up to thirty-five years, gave the prize during those years a value more symbolic and testimonial than real, and contributed only because it was considered the dean of the prizes for writers in the Spanish language.

=== Calls and awards "Fundación Premio Fastenrath" (1909–2003) ===
Year	Call	Period of publication	Author	Work	Mode
1910	Fastenrath 1909	1909	Carlos Fernández Shaw	La vida loca	Generic
1911	Fastenrath 1910 (Note: Being unique and indivisible in each call, and the proposal presented by the Royal Spanish Academy to the king was from two works by two different authors, Alfonso XIII ordered the delivery of the two awards with their own money.)	1910	Ricardo León y Román [ex-æquo] Arturo Reyes Aguilar [ex-æquo]	El amor de los amores [ex-æquo] Béticas [ex-æquo]	Generic
1912	Fastenrath 1911 (Note: In this edition it was presented, without success, El árbol de la ciencia, by Pío Baroja y Nessi.)	1911	Ciro Bayo y Segurola	Lazarillo español. Guía de vagos en tierras de España por un peregrino industrioso	Generic
1913	Fastenrath 1912 (Note: In this edition, Campos de Castilla, by Antonio Machado; and Melancolía, by Juan Ramón Jiménez, both advertised by Miguel Martínez Ruiz "Azorín", were presented unsuccessfully.)	1912	Manuel de Sandoval y Cutolí Ibarra	De mi cercado	Generic
1914	Fastenrath 1913	1913	Marcos Rafael Blanco Belmonte	Al sembrar los trigos	Generic
1915	Fastenrath 1914	1914	Concha Espina y Tagle de Serna	La esfinge maragata	Generic
1916	Fastenrath 1915	1915	Alejandro Pérez Lugín	La casa de la Troya	Generic
1917	Fastenrath 1916	1916	Enrique de Mesa Rosales	El silencio de la Cartuja	Generic
1918	Fastenrath 1917	1917	Mauricio López-Roberts y Terry	El verdadero hogar	Generic
1919	Fastenrath 1918	1918	Guillermo Díaz Caneja	El sobre en blanco	Generic
1920	Fastenrath 1919	1919	Void	Void	Poetry
1921	Fastenrath 1919	1919-1920	Juan de Contreras y López de Ayala	Poemas castellanos	Poetry
1921	Fastenrath 1920	1919-1920	Narciso Alonso Cortés	Zorrilla. Su vida y sus obras, 3 vols.	Literature Essay
1922	Fastenrath 1921	1919-1921	Francisco Camba	La revolución de Laíño	Novel
1923	Fastenrath 1922	1919-1922	Vicente Lampérez y Romea (Note: Posthumous grant.)	Arquitectura civil española de los siglos I al XVIII	Historical
1924	Fastenrath 1923 (rectificación)	1919-1923	Miguel Jiménez Aquino	Various translations from Greek and Latin	Theatre
1925	Fastenrath 1924	1921-1924	José del Río Sainz	Versos del mar y otros poemas	Poetry
1926	Fastenrath 1925	1921-1925	Ángel Valbuena Prat	Los autos sacramentales de Calderón. Clasificación y análisis	Literature Essay
1927	Fastenrath 1926 (Note: The choice of the winning work required two sessions with several votes. The finalists were The leper bishop by Gabriel Miró; The seven columns by Wenceslao Fernández Flórez; and The center of souls and Holy new woman, both by Antonio Porras Márquez.)	1922-1926	Antonio Porras Márquez	El centro de las almas	Novel
1928	Fastenrath 1927	1923-1927	Félix de Llanos y Torriglia	Así llegó a reinar Isabel la Católica	Historical
1929	Fastenrath 1928	1924-1928	Eusebio de Gorbea Lemni	Los que no perdonan	Theatre
1930	Fastenrath 1929	1925-1929	Eduardo Luis del Palacio Fontán	Espuma	Poetry
1931	Fastenrath 1930 (Note: The finalists were A song to the divine. Vida y pensamiento a San Juan de la Cruz, by Juan Domínguez Berrueta; La nueva literatura vol III. La evolución de la poesía (1917-1927) and La nueva literatura vol IV. La evolución de la Novel (1917-1927), by Rafael Cansinos Asséns; Las escritoras españolas by Margarita Nelken Mansberger; Documentos platónicos, by Emeterio Mazarriaga; and Un texto árabe occidental de la Leyenda de Alejandro según el manuscrito ár. XXVII of the Library of the Junta para Ampliación de Estudios, by Emilio García Gómez.)	1926-1930	Emilio García Gómez	Un texto árabe occidental de la Leyenda de Alejandro según el manuscrito ár. XXVII de la Biblioteca de la Junta para Ampliación de Estudios	Literature Essay
1932	Fastenrath 1931 (Note: The finalists were Tirano Banderas and La Corte de los Milagros, both by Ramón del Valle-Inclán; Semana de pasión, by Mariano Tomás López; El tesoro de los monfíes by Ángel Menoyo Portolés; and El convento de los reyes, by Guillermo Hernández Mir. In the first session, the first vote resulted in Tirano Banderas 11 votes, Semana de pasión 8 votes and El tesoro de los monfíes 6 votes. The second vote resulted in Passion Week 13 votes, Tirano Banderas 12 votes, and 1 blank vote. In the second session, the third vote resulted in The Court of Miracles 10 votes, Passion Week 5 (or 4) votes (depending on the source), Tirano Banderas 2 (or 3) votes (depending on the source), and 8 blank votes. After two sessions and three votes, by not obtaining any work the absolute majority of favorable votes, the prize was declared void. At: «Sobre el premio Fastenrath». En: ABC, 21 may. 1932, p. 31. ISSN 1136-0143; «El premio Fastenrath void». En: La Vanguardia, 21 may. 1932, p. 27. ISSN 1133-4835.)	1927-1931	Void	Void	Novel
1933	Fastenrath 1932	1928-1932	Agustín Millares Carlo	Tratado de paleografía española	Historical
1934	Fastenrath 1933 (rectificación)	1929-1933	Hipólito González y Rodríguez de la Peña 'Julio Romano'	Pedro Antonio de Alarćon, el novelista romántico	Theatre
1935	Fastenrath 1934	1930-1934	José María Morón y Barrientos	Minero de estrellas	Poetry
1936	Fastenrath 1935	1931-1935	José María de Cossío y Martínez-Fortún	Los toros en la poesía castellana. Estudio y antología	Literature Essay
1937	Fastenrath 1936 (Note: Not summoned.)	-----	-----	-----	-----
1938	Fastenrath 1937	-----	-----	-----	-----
1939	Fastenrath 1938	-----	-----	-----	-----
1940	Fastenrath 1939	-----	-----	-----	-----
1941	Fastenrath 1940		Francisco de Cossío y Martínez-Fortún	Manolo	Novel
1942	Fastenrath 1941		Luciano de Taxonera [ex-æquo] Ricardo del Arco y Garay [ex-æquo]	Un político español del siglo XIX. González Bravo y su tiempo (1811-1871) [ex-æquo] Fernando el Católico. Artífice de la España Imperial [ex-æquo]	Historical
1943	Fastenrath 1942		Adriano del Valle y Rossi	Arpa fiel	Poetry
1944	Fastenrath 1943		Dámaso Alonso y Fernández de las Redondas [ex-æquo] Juan Antonio Zunzunegui y Loredo [ex-æquo]	La poesía de san Juan de la Cruz. (Desde esta ladera) [ex-æquo] ¡Ay..., estos hijos! [ex-æquo]	Literature Essay; Novel
1945	Fastenrath 1944		Francisco Layna Serrano	Historical de Guadalajara y sus Mendozas en los siglos XV y XVI	Generic
1946	Fastenrath 1945		Juan Antonio Cabezas	Rubén Darío. (un poeta y una vida)	Drama
1947	Fastenrath 1946		Ginés de Albareda Herrera	Romancero del Caribe	Poetry
1948	Fastenrath 1947		Julián Marías Aguilera	Miguel de Unamuno	Literature Essay
1949	Fastenrath 1948		Carmen Laforet Díaz	Nada	Novel
1950	Fastenrath 1949		Void	Void	Generic
1951	Fastenrath 1950	1946-1950	José López Rubio	Celos en el aire	Drama
1952	Fastenrath 1951		Leopoldo Panero Torbado	Escrito a cada instante	Poetry
1953	Fastenrath 1952		Carlos Bousoño Prieto	Teoría de la expresión poética	Literature Essay
1954	Fastenrath 1953				Novel
1955	Fastenrath 1954		Luis García de Valdeavellano y Arcimís	Historical de España. De los orígenes a la baja edad media	Generic
1956	Fastenrath 1955	1951-1955	Edgar Neville Romrée	El baile	Drama
1957	Fastenrath 1956	1952-1956	José García Nieto	La red	Poetry
1958	Fastenrath 1957	1953-1957	Luis Felipe Vivanco	Introducción a la poesía española contemporánea	Literature Essay
1959	Fastenrath 1958	1954-1958	Miguel Delibes Setién	Siestas con viento sur	Novel
1960	Fastenrath 1959		Ramón Solís Llorente	El Cádiz de las Cortes	Generic
1961	Fastenrath 1960	1956-1960			Drama
1962	Fastenrath 1961	1957-1961	Blas de Otero	Ancia	Drama
1963	Fastenrath 1962	1958-1962	Miguel Alonso Calvo 'Ramón de Garcilasol'	Lección de Rubén Darío	Literature Essay
1964	Fastenrath 1963	1959-1963			Novel
1965	Fastenrath 1964	1960-1964	Pedro de Lorenzo Morales	Fray Luis de León	Generic
1966	Fastenrath 1965	1961-1965	Jaime Salom Vidal	El baúl de los disfraces	Drama
1967	Fastenrath 1966	1962-1966	Manuel Mantero Sáenz	Misa solemne	Poetry
1968	Fastenrath 1967	1963-1967	José María Alonso Gamo	Un español en el mundo: Santayana	Crítica literaria o Essay
1969	Fastenrath 1968	1964-1968	Ana María Matute	Los soldados lloran de noche	Novel
1970	Fastenrath 1969	1965-1969	Luis de Castresana y Rodríguez	Catalina de Erauso. La Monja Alférez	Generic
1971	Fastenrath 1970	1966-1970	Torcuato Luca de Tena Brunet	Hay una luz sobre la cama	Drama
1972	Fastenrath 1971	1967-1971	Aquilino Duque Gimeno	De palabra en palabra	Poetry
1973	Fastenrath 1972	1968-1972	José Luis Cano	La poesía de la generación de 1927	Crítica literaria o Essay
1974	Fastenrath 1973		Ángel María de Lera García	Se vende un hombre	Novel
1975	Fastenrath 1974	1970-1974	Mercedes Fórmica Corsi	La hija de don Juan de Austria (Ana de Jesús en el proceso al pastelero de Madrigal)	Generic
1976	Fastenrath 1975	1971-1975	Ana Isabel Álvarez-Diosdado Gisbert 'Ana Diosdado'	Usted también podrá disfrutar de ella	Drama
1977	Fastenrath 1976	1972-1976	Justo Jorge Padrón	Los círculos del infierno	Poetry
1978	Fastenrath 1977		Andrés Amorós Guardiola	Vida y literatura en troteras y danzaderas	Essay
1979	Fastenrath 1978	1974-1978	Jesús Fernández Santos	La que no tiene nombre	Novel
1980	Fastenrath 1979	1975-1979	Rafael Montesinos Martínez	Bécquer, biografía e imagen	Generic
1981	Fastenrath 1980		José Luis Alfonso Rodríguez Vallejo 'Alfonso Vallejo'	El cero transparente	Drama
1982	Fastenrath 1981		José Miguel Santiago Castelo	Memorial de ausencias	Poetry
1983	Fastenrath 1982		Santos Sanz Villanueva	Historical de la novela social española, 1942-1975	Literature Essay
1984	Fastenrath 1983	1979-1983	Blanca García-Valdecasas y Andrada-Vanderwilde 'Blanca Valdecasas'	La puerta de los sueños	Novel
1985	Fastenrath 1984	1980-1984	Alberto Navarro González	Calderón de la Barca. De lo trágico a lo grotesco	Generic
1986	Fastenrath 1985	1981-1985			Drama
1987	Fastenrath 1986	1982-1986	Antonio Porpeta Román 'Antonio Porpetta'	Los sigilos violados	Drama
1988	Fastenrath 1987	1983-1987	Miguel Ángel Lozano Marco	Del relato modernista a la Novel poemática. La narrativa breve de Ramón Pérez de Ayala	Literature Essay
1989	Fastenrath 1987 (Note: Errata in the call. It should correspond to Fastenrath 1988.)	1984-1988	Antonio Pereira González	El síndrome de Estocolmo	Novel
1990	Fastenraht 1989	1985-1989			Generic
1991	Fastenrath 1990	1990 (Note: In the call, the period indicated covers exclusively that year.)			Drama
1992	Fastenrath 1991	1987-1991	Enrique Badosa Pedro	Epigramas confidenciales	Liric
1993	Fastenrath 1992	1988-1992			Essay
1994	Fastenrath 1993	1989-1993	Lauro Olmo Gallego	Tituladlo como querais	Novel
1995	Fastenrath 1994		Javier Marías Franco	Mañana en la batalla piensa en mí	Novel
1996	Fastenrath 1995 (Note: A first selection was made among ten works previously chosen in the sections of Poetry, Novel and Essays and studies. The finalists were: La Puerta del Sol, by Fernando Fernán Gómez; Tiempo de guerras, by José Manuel Caballero Bonald; and La última costa, by Francisco Brines Baño.)		Fernando Fernán Gómez	La Puerta del Sol	Novel
1997	Fastenrath 1996 (Note: A first selection was made among twenty-one works previously chosen in the sections of Poetry, Novel and Essays and studies. The finalists were: Vida de Galdós, by Pedro Ortiz Armengol; Lo raro es vivir, by Carmen Martín Gaite; and Nadie, by José María Valente.)		Pedro Ortiz Armengol	Vida de Galdós	Essays
1998	Fastenrath 1997		Francisco Brines Baño	La última costa	Poetry
2000	Fastenrath 1998	1996-1998	Anton Jon Juaristi Linacero	El bucle melancólico. Historicals de nacionalistas vascos	Essay
2001	Fastenrath 1999		Álvaro Pombo García de los Ríos	La cuadratura del círculo	Novel
2002	Fastenrath 2000 (Note: The finalists were: Himnos tardíos, by Jaime Siles; Melos melancolía, by Carlos Edmundo de Ory; and Verano inglés, by Guillermo Carnero Arbat.)	1999-2001	Guillermo Carnero Arbat	Verano inglés	Poetry
2003	Fastenrath 2002		José Álvarez Junco	Mater dolorosa. La idea de España en el siglo XIX	Essay

== Premi Fastenrath (1909–1983) ==
=== History and organization ===
The Fastenrath couple's connection with the Barcelona Floral Games ("Jocs Florals de Barcelona") was close and long-lasting. Fastenrath's passion for the Hispanic world and its literature led him to move some of the literary traditions of Hispanic culture, and particularly Catalan culture, to Cologne, the German city where he lived. Thus, in 1898, he established in Cologne some floral games (1898-1914), in imitation of the Barcelona Floral Games (1859- ), which he personally directed until his death and his widow continued, until her subsequent death in 1914. Luise Goldmann, who always maintained her husband's interests and memory, had already been appointed Queen of the Barcelona Floral Games in 1889.

So, in order to carry out Luisa Goldmann's task, Barcelona City Council arranged for the creation of the Premi Fastenrath, with the income from municipal debt securities acquired with the founding capital provided, and assigned the administration and organisation of the prizes to the Consistori dels Jocs Florals de Barcelona, in accordance with regulations approved by the plenary session of the municipal corporation in November 1908.

The annual calls were always made by awarding a single prize, which rotated in triennial cycles between three modalities, novel, poetry and dramatic work. The first call for entries for the "Premi Fastenrath" was in 1909, and it remained in force until 1936, during the entire period in which the Barcelona Floral Games were held, before they were interrupted by the Spanish Civil War.

During the period 1941–1977, in which the celebrations of the Catalan language were suspended by the municipal institutions, and the floral games were held in Barcelona in a private way, the "Premi Fastenrath" was called by the organization of the "Jocs Florals de la Llengua Catalana", which kept the annual celebrations in an itinerant way in different cities of the world. In this period the prize money will be given away in various currencies depending on the edition, such as Mexican pesos or dollars.

Once the "Jocs Florals de Barcelona" were officially reinstated by the Barcelona City Council, during a first stage (1978-1983) the inherited prize system was maintained. Later, in a second stage (1984-2005), the system will be reduced and only the three awards with which the Barcelona Floral Games began in 1859 will be maintained, only the exclusively poetic awards ("Englantina", "Viola" and "Flor natural"), so the "Premi Fastenrath" will disappear; and from 2006, only one poetry award will be granted, the "Premi de Poesia Jocs Florals de Barcelona".

=== Premi Fastenrath winners ===
==== Barcelona Floral Games (1909–1936) ====
Year	Call	Period of publication (Note: The dates of the years are inclusive.)	Author	Work	Type
1909	Fastenrath 1909	1903-1908	Caterina Albert i Paradís 'Victor Català'	Solitud	Novel
1910	Fastenrath 1910	1904-1909	Joan Maragall i Gorina	Enllà	Poetry
1911	Fastenrath 1911		Àngel Guimerà	L'Eloi.Drama en tres actes i en prosa.	Drama
1912	Fastenrath 1912		Narcís Oller i Moragas	Pilar Prim	Novel
1913	Fastenrath 1913	1907-1912	Josep Carner i Puig-Oriol	Les monjoies	Poetry
1914	Fastenrath 1914		Ignasi Iglésias Pujadas	Foc nou. Comèdia en tres actes	Drama
1915	Fastenrath 1915		Santiago Rusiñol i Prats	El català de La Mancha	Novel
1916	Fastenrath 1916		Miquel dels Sants Oliver i Tolrà	Poesies	Poetry
1917	Fastenrath 1917 (Note: When declared void, the amount is used to increase the capital of the prize with the purchase of municipal debt securities .)		Void	Void	Drama
1918	Fastenrath 1918				Novel
1919	Fastenrath 1919	1913-1918	Joan Alcover i Maspons	Poemes Bíblics	Poetry
1920	Fastenrath 1920		Josep Pous i Pagès	Papallones. Comèdia en tres actes	Drama
1921	Fastenrath 1921				Novela
1922	Fastenrath 1922		Llorenç Riber i Campins	Les corones	Poetry
1923	Fastenrath 1923				Drama
1924	Fastenrath 1924		Josep Roig i Raventós	L'ermità Maurici	Novel
1925	Fastenrath 1925 (Note: When declared void, the amount is used to increase the capital of the prize with the purchase of municipal debt securities .)		Void	Void	Poetry
1926	Fastenrath 1926	1920-1925	Josep Maria de Sagarra i de Castellarnau	Cançons de totes les hores	Poetry
1927	Fastenrath 1927	1921-1926	Pompeyo Crehuet i Pardas	La vall de Josafat	Drama
1928	Fastenrath 1928	1922-1927	Joan Santamaria i Monné	La filla d'en Tartarí	Novel
1929	Fastenrath 1929	1923-1928	Josep Maria López-Picó	L'oci de la paraula. Op. XX	Poetry
1930	Fastenrath 1930		Ignasi Iglésias Pujadas	La llar apagada	Drama
1931	Fastenrath 1931		Joan Oller i Rabassa	Quan mataven pels carrers	Novel
1932	Fastenrath 1932		Joan Maria Guasch i Miró	Camí de la Font	Poetry
1933	Fastenrath 1933	1927-1932	Prudenci Bertrana i Comte	El comiat de Teresa. Comèdia en tres actes	Drama
1934	Fastenrath 1934		Sebastià Juan Arbó	Terres de l'Ebre	Novel
1935	Fastenrath 1935		Marià Manent i Cisa	L'ombra i altres poemes	Poetry
1936	Fastenrath 1936		Ramon Vinyes i Cluet	Fornera, rossor de pa. Comèdia en tres actes	Drama

==== Catalan Language Floral Games (1941–1977) ====
Year	Call	Period of publication	Author	Work	Mode
Buenos Aires, 1941	Fastenrath 1941		Xavier Benguerel i Llobet	Fira de desenganys	Drama
México D.F., 1942	Fastenrath 1942		Agustí Bartra i Lleonart	Xabola	Novel
Santiago de Chile, 1943	Fastenrath 1943	1937-1942	Josep Carner i Puig-Oriol	Nabí	Poetry
La Habana, 1944	Fastenrath 1944		August Pi i Sunyer; Pere Mas i Perera [accésit]	La novel·la del besavi L'alliberament de mossèn Malquíades [accésit]	Novel
Bogotá, 1945	Fastenrath 1945				
Montpellier, 1946	Fastenrath 1946				
Londres, 1947	Fastenrath 1947				
París, 1948	Fastenrath 1948				
Montevideo, 1949	Fastenrath 1949				
Perpiñán, 1950	Fastenrath 1950				
Nueva York, 1951	Fastenrath 1951				
Tulousse, 1952	Fastenrath 1952				
Caracas, 1953	Fastenrath 1953				
São Paulo, 1954	Fastenrath 1954				
San José de Costa Rica, 1955	Fastenrath 1955		Agustí Cabruja i Auguet	Les òlibes	Novel
Cambridge, 1956	Fastenrath 1956		----	----	----
México D.F., 1957	Fastenrath 1957	1955-1957	Odó Hurtado i Martí [ex-æquo] Manuel de Pedrolo Molina [ex-æquo]	L'araceli bru [ex-æquo] Un de nosaltres [ex-æquo]	Novel
Mendoza, 1958	Fastenrath 1958		----	----	----
París, 1959	Fastenrath 1959		Maria Assumpció Soler i Font	L'escollit	Novel
Buenos Aires, 1960	Fastenrath 1960				
El Alguer, 1961	Fastenrath 1961				
Santiago de Chile, 1962	Fastenrath 1962				
Montevideo, 1963	Fastenrath 1963				
Perpiñán, 1964	Fastenrath 1964		Joan Oller i Rabassa	El serpent de Laocoont	Novel
París, 1965	Fastenrath 1965		Joaquim Amat-Piniella	K. L. Reich	Novel
Caracas, 1966	Fastenrath 1966				
Marsella, 1967	Fastenrath 1967		----	----	----
Zurich, 1968	Fastenrath 1968		----	----	----
Guadalajara (México), 1969	Fastenrath 1969		----	----	----
Tubinga, 1970 o Bruselas, 1971	Fastenrath 1970; Fastenrath 1971		Maria dels Àngels Vayreda i Trullol	Encara no sé com sóc	Novel
Tubinga, 1970	Fastenrath 1970		Gabriela Woith de Costa [ex-æquo] Irma Sander [ex-æquo]	Tres cuentos de Mercè Rodoreda i Gurguí [ex-æquo] Translations by Salvador Espriu i Castelló [ex-æquo]	Translation of literary work
Bruselas, 1971	Fastenrath 1971		Bob de Nijs	Antígona by Salvador Espriu i Castelló	Translation of literary work
Ginebra, 1972	Fastenrath 1972		----	----	----
México D.F., 1973	Fastenrath 1973				
Amsterdam, 1974	Fastenrath 1974				
Caracas, 1975	Fastenrath 1975				
Lausana, 1976	Fastenrath 1976		----	----	----
Munich, 1977	Fastenrath 1977		Marina Ginestà	Les antipodes	

==== Barcelona Floral Games (1978–1983) ====
Year	Call	Period of publication	Author	Work	Mod
1978	Fastenrath 1978		Miquel Martí i Pol	His work as a whole	Poetry
1979	Fastenrath 1979		Void	Void	
1980	Fastenrath 1980		Jaume Cabré i Fabré	Carn d'olla	Novel
1980	Fastenrath 1981				
1982	Fastenrath 1982				
1983	Fastenrath 1983				
