= Arturo Reyes =

Arturo Reyes may refer to:

- Arturo Reyes (writer) (1864–1913), Spanish writer
- Arturo Lona Reyes (1925–2020), Mexican bishop
- Arturo Reyes (footballer) (born 1969), Colombian football manager and former footballer
