= Luise Fastenrath =

Hungarian writer and translator (1858–1914)

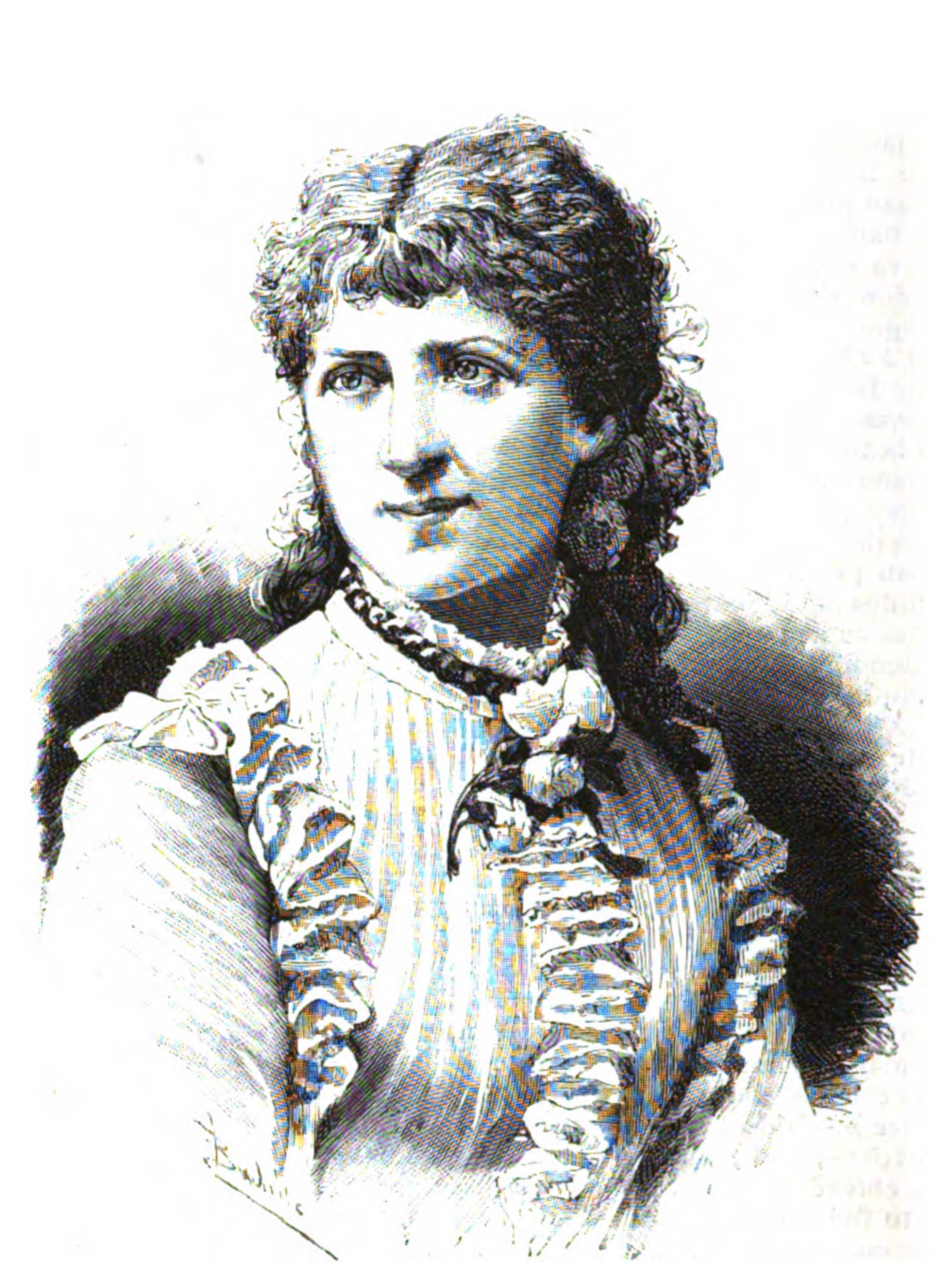
- Fastenrath in 1890
- Born: Luise Goldmann; 10 March 1858; Zombor, Kingdom of Hungary
- Died: 28 March 1914 (aged 56); Cologne, Prussia, German Empire
- Spouse: Johannes Fastenrath (m. 1883; died 1908)
- Writing career
- Pen name: Luise von Asten

Luise Fastenrath (née Goldmann; 10 March 1858 – 28 March 1914), also known by the pen name Luise von Asten, was a Hungarian-born writer and translator.

She was born to a Jewish family in Zombor, the younger sister of Anna Forstenheim. In 1883, she converted to Catholicism and married writer Johannes Fastenrath at the Augustinian Church in Vienna. She founded the Fastenrath Foundation soon after her husband's death in 1908.

Fastenrath translated numerous works into German from Spanish, Catalan, and French, including José Echegaray's drama Vida alegre y muerte triste.
