= Carnestoltes (short story) =

1905 Catalan-language short story

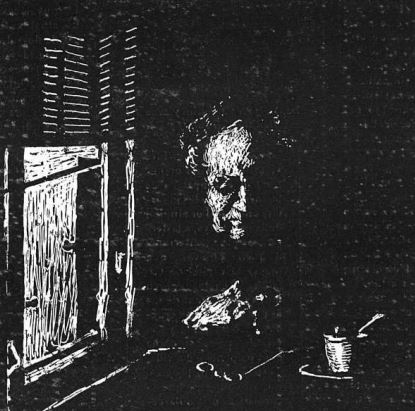
- An illustration from the book
- Author: Caterina Albert
- Language: Catalan
- Genre: Short story
- Publication date: 1907
- Publication place: Spain

Carnestoltes (English: Carnival) is a short story published in Catalan in 1907 by Caterina Albert under her pen name Victor Catalá. The story is considered one of the first lesbian-themed stories in Catalan literature. It was first published in 1905, and then republished in 1907 as part of the third and final volume of her short story collection Caires vius ("Living cities") by the Joventut Library.

The Spanish language version, possibly translated by the author, was published under the title "Carnaval" as a part of the second volume of La novela femenina ("The female novel") in 1930.

== Synopsis ==
The Marquess of Artigues i Glòria is an elderly woman belonging to high society. Her advanced age often keeps her confined to a chair, and she lives in isolation with limited distractions provided by reading and occasional visitors. Even witnessing the festive bustle of the Carnival outside from the window in her house, does little to alter her state of mind. While she lives a monotonous life, a turning point emerges when a new personal waitress Glòria arrives. Although the Marquess had traditionally maintained a distant and hostile relationship with her servants, the new servant, younger and more faithful to her, offers a different perspective. This gives rise to the emergence of an unprecedented feeling in the Marquess, characterized by an affective attraction and a desire, which she does not dare to show externally. The two women later begin to share a latent relationship which had until then remained inadvertent or repressed. However, the happiness is short lived, as Gloria suddenly dies in front of the Marquess, who is powerless and can do nothing for her.

== Interpretation and reception ==
The story has been highlighted for its bold representation of lesbian desire. As per La Lectora, the Carnival celebrations are used to highlight several characteristics. The celebrations are initially contrasted against the initial attitude of the Marquess. Later, when the Marquess acknowledges her love for another woman, which she conceals initially, and reveals it later, it is compared to the stripping of the mask and costumes worn during the Carnival. The symbolic masking can also be linked to the usage of a pen name by the author. In this sense, the figure of Víctor Català functions as a "mask" that serves as a screen between the public and the private identity of the author Caterina Albert.
