= Manuel Mantero =

Spanish academic and writer (1930–2024)

Manuel Mantero (29 July 1930 – 2024) was a Spanish academic and writer. In 1969, Mantero moved to the United States and continued his work as a professor.

== Life and career ==
=== Early life and education ===
Manuel Mantero was born in Seville on 29 July 1930. He earned a law degree from the University of Seville, and a doctorate in law from the University of Salamanca, with a dissertation on philosophy and law in the work of the Italian poet Giacomo Leopardi (1957). He served as a professor in the University of Seville and contributor to the School of Hispanic American Studies, under the direction of Spain’s Higher Council of Scientific Research (Consejo Superior de Investigaciones Científicas), as well as a member of the school journal, Estudios Americanos (American Studies.) In 1960, he moved to Madrid, with a hiatus in Rome, where he did research under the auspices of the Italian Government. During the 1960s, he developed an intense cultural and professional body work: literary critic, collaborator with newspapers and specialized publications, commentator on television or radio programs and a speaker on Spain’s lecture circuit. During the 60's, he worked as a professor at the University of Madrid. Mantero was a member of the Cervantes Institute in Madrid, and the National Institute of Legal Studies, both academic affiliates of the Higher Council of Scientific Research.

=== Move to the United States ===
In 1969, Mantero moved to the United States as a full professor at Western Michigan University. In Western Michigan, he founded and edited the magazine Sagittarius, whose contributors included Jorge Luis Borges, Jorge Guillén, Vicente Aleixandre, Agustín Yáñez, Emilio Carballido. In 1973, he moved to the University of Georgia, where he occupied a special Chair as a Distinguished Literature Professor until August of the year 2000, the date of his retirement. He was later an emeritus distinguished research professor at the University of Georgia.

During the years Mantero resided outside of Spain, he never stopped returning to his native country or participating in its cultural traditions. Two of his most recent books, Había una ventana de colores (memorias) (There Was a Window of Colors (memoirs)) and Equipaje (poesía) (Luggage (poetry)), were initially released in Spain. The memoirs were introduced by Spain's Minister of Culture, Carmen Calvo, Prof. Jorge Urrutia, Technical Director of the Cervantes Institute, and writer/journalist Antonio Burgos. The book of verse was introduced in Madrid by Prof. Rogelio Blanco, Director General of Books, Archives and Libraries, and Prof. Juan Carlos Marset, poet and Delegate of Culture to the City Council of Seville.

Mantero died in Athens, Georgia in 2024.

== Honors and awards ==
Mantero won Spain's National Award for Literature (1960), the Fastenrath Award given by the Spanish Royal Academy of Language (1967), the Albert Christ-Janer Award (1981), The March Foundation Literary Prize (1964) and Andalusian Critics’ Award (1995 and 2005). He was a member of the Seville’s Royal Academy of Letters (1985). Mantero received the Golden Seals of Luis de Góngora awarded by Córdoba’s Royal Academy (2003), Seville’s Gold Medal (2005). In 2006 the City Council of Seville named a street for him.

He served as a consultant to the Royal Swedish Academy for the Nobel Prize for literature. Mantero was an honorary member of French, Italian and Hispanic international academic associations. He was a member of the America's premier Hispanic Society, Sigma Delta Pi's Order of Don Quixote. Mantero represented Spain at international literary fairs and conferences, such as at the Miami Book Fair International and the Euro-San Francisco Poetry Festival. Monographs, conferences and special sessions have been dedicated to Mantero’s poetry. Books in English by Douglas Barnette, A Study of the Works of Manuel Mantero, and by Betty Jean Craige, Manuel Mantero. New Songs for the Ruins of Spain have introduced him to British and American readers. His work has been translated into several languages (English, French, Portuguese, Italian, German, Romanian, Ukrainian, Polish, etc.) In the words of Vicente Aleixandre, recipient of the 1977 Nobel Prize for Literature, Manuel Mantero “has produced a work that adds value to the whole of the current Spanish lyric by his personality and stature”. “Work” -says Aleixandre- that “makes an indelible mark in the poetry of his time”.

== Bibliography ==
=== Poetry ===
- Mínimas del ciprés y los labios, Col. Alcaraván, Arcos de la Frontera, 1958.
- Tiempo del hombre, Col. Ágora, Madrid, 1960.
- La lámpara común, Col. Adonáis, Madrid, 1961.
- Misa solemne, Editora Nacional, Madrid, 1966.
- Ya quiere amanecer, Col. Dulcinea, Madrid, 1975. Edición facsímil, Lautaro, Buenos Aires-Seville-Chicago, 1988.
- Memorias de Deucalión, Plaza y Janés, Barcelona, 1982.
- Fiesta, Endymion, Madrid, 1995.
- Color y olor, CajaSur, Cordoba, 1997.
- Antología, Ayuntamiento de Seville, 2001.
- Primavera del ser, Igitur, Tarragona, 2003.
- Equipaje, RD Editores, Seville, 2005.
- El olor de la azalea. Antología personal, Cuadernos, Universidad de León, 2012.

Previously his books of poetry were compiled in 1972 by the Plaza y Janés Editorial titled Poesía (1958–1971) and in 1996 by the University of Seville Press and the Foundation El Monte under the title *Como llama en el diamante (3 vols., 1996).

=== Essays, criticism and anthologies ===
- Poesía española contemporánea, Plaza y Janés, Barcelona, 1966.
- La poesía del Yo al Nosotros, Guadarrama, Madrid, 1971.
- Los derechos del hombre en la poesía hispánica contemporánea, Gredos, Madrid, 1973.
- Poetas españoles de posguerra, Espasa-Calpe, Madrid, 1986.
- Ricardo Molina. Dos libros inéditos. Ed. de Manuel Mantero y Mariano Roldán. Prologue by Manuel Mantero, Col. Dulcinea, Madrid, 1975.
- Jorge Guillén, Plaza y Janés, 1975; Círculo de Lectores, Barcelona, 1984.

=== Novels ===
- Estiércol de león, Plaza y Janés, 1980.
- Antes muerto que mudado, Plaza y Janés, 1990.

=== Miscellaneous ===
- Crates de Tebas, Esquío, Ferrol, 1980.
- Poesía y prosa, Anthropos, Barcelona, 1991.
- Había una ventana de colores. Memorias y desmemorias, RD Editores, Sevilla, 2004.

=== Complete works ===
- RD Editores edited four volumes under the title of Obras completas: Poesía –vol. I, 2007-, Narrativa –vol. II, 2008- y Ensayo y Crítica –vols. III, 2008 y IV, 2011).

=== Interviews ===
- Espada Sánchez, José: “Manuel Mantero”, in the vol. Poetas del Sur, Espasa Calpe, Col. Austral, Madrid, 1989.
- Paco, Sara: “Manuel Mantero como interlocutor”, in the vol. Manuel Mantero: lectura de la

llama en el verso, Sociedad Valle-Inclán, Col. La Barca de Loto, Ferrol, 2002.

== Sources ==
- Cano, José Luis: “La poesía de Manuel Mantero”, in Poesía española contemporánea. Las generaciones de posguerra, Madrid, 1974.
- Hernández, Antonio: “Manuel Mantero”, in Una promoción desheredada: la poética del 50, Madrid, 1978.
- Debicki, Andrew P.: “Ángel Crespo y Manuel Mantero”, in La generación española de 1956, Madrid, 1987.
- V.V.A.A.: “Manuel Mantero. Una poética indagatoria de la otredad”, in Anthropos, n. 116, dedicated to Manuel Mantero, 1991.
- Mantero, José María: “Los símbolos de creación y destrucción en Antes muerto que mudado de Manuel Mantero”, in Salina, n. 8, December 1994.
- Barnette, Douglas W.: A Study of the Works of Manuel Mantero, Lewiston, N. York; Queenston, Ontario; Lampeter, United Kingdom, 1995.
- Gómez Bedate, Pilar: “Manuel Mantero, del Yo al Nosotros”, in Poetas españoles del siglo XX, Madrid, 1999.
- V.V.A.A.: Manuel Mantero, in República de las Letras, n. 7, dedicated to Manuel Mantero, July 2001.
- V.V.A.A.: Manuel Mantero: lectura de la llama en el verso, vol. dedicated to Manuel Mantero. Eds. Julia Uceda and Sara Pujol. Ferrol, 2002.
- Ross, John A.: “Madre del tiempo”, in Tierra de Nadie, n. 6, September 2005.
- Peñas-Bermejo, Francisco J.: “La pluralidad del Yo en la poesía de Manuel Mantero”. Introduction to vol. I de Obras completas. Poesía: Como llama en el diamante de Manuel Mantero, Sevilla, 2007.
- Crespo, Ángel: “La espiral lírica de Manuel Mantero”, in Las cenizas de la flor, Madrid, 2008.
- Soto Vázquez, José, y Ramón Pérez Parejo: “La singularidad del poeta Manuel Mantero: Guía didáctica a través de los textos”, in Fuentes, n. 10, 2010.

=== Recordings on CD or cassette ===
- “Manuel Mantero”: Encuentro de Luis Cernuda con Verlaine y el demonio, in the poet’s own voice, in Doce poetas en sus versos, Aguilar, GPE 10 114 (with Rafael Alberti, Jorge Guillén, Carmen Conde, Ángel González and others).
- “Manuel Mantero: Evangelio del día”, in Poesía última, Fidias, F-048-33. (With Manuel Alcántara, Claudio Rodríguez, José Ángel Valente, Carlos Sahagún and others).
- “Manuel Mantero: Evangelio del día”, in Poesía última, S.G.A.E. MF-36. Cassette.

=== Audio and visual links ===
- “Manuel Mantero”, www.acec.cat Poets’ File. Vídeo. Commentated poetry reading by the poet, with an interview. (Also on DVD-R 4 x).
- “Manuel Mantero”, www.bibliotecavirtualdeandalucia.es/opencms/vivavoz/html Vídeo. Commentated poetry reading by the poet, with an interview.
- Burgos, Antonio: “El RedCuadro. Personajes, Manuel Mantero”, www.antonioburgos.com
- Gómez-Martínez, José Luis: “Manuel Mantero. On High”, www.ensayistas.org/textos/poesía/alto.htm
- Acuyo, Francisco: “Manuel Mantero from the Infinite Hemishere”, www.franciscoacuyo.com/2011/02/manuel-mantero-desde-el-hemisferio.html
- Acereda, Alberto: “Baggage by Manuel Mantero”, www.libertaddigital.com/libros

(17 December 2005).
