= Alfonso Vallejo =

Spanish writer (1943–2021)

- Born: Alfonso Rodríguez Vallejo; 19 August 1943; Santander, Spain
- Died: 3 December 2021 (aged 78); Madrid, Spain
- Occupations: Playwright; Poet; Painter; Neurologist
- Writing career
- Notable works: Ácido Sulfúrico (1975); El desguace (1974); A Tumba Abierta (1976); El Cero Transparente (1977)
- Notable awards: Lope de Vega, 1975 (runner-up prize); Lope de Vega, 1976; Internacional Tirso de Molina, 1978; Fastenrath de la Real Academia, 1981
- Website: www.obrascompletasalfonsovallejo.com

Alfonso Rodríguez Vallejo (19 August 1943 – 3 December 2021) was a Spanish playwright, poet, painter and neurologist. He had published 34 plays and 25 poetry books. Vallejo was awarded the Lope de Vega prize in 1976 for his play "El desgüace". "Ácido Sulfúrico" was the runner-up prize in 1975. In 1978 he received the Internacional Tirso de Molina prize for his work A Tumba Abierta. The Spanish Royal Academy (Real Academia Española), in 1981, awarded Vallejo the Fastenrath Award for "El cero transparente".

Vallejo's plays have been performed in many cities in Europe, the United States and South America. His works have also been translated into French, German, Arabic, Italian, Portuguese and Bulgarian.

Alfonso Vallejo was a Professor of Medical Pathology practising in one of the major hospitals in Madrid. He qualified as a medical doctor from the Universidad Complutense de Madrid in 1966 and continued his professional training in Spain, Britain, Germany, France and Denmark.

== Biography ==
=== Early life and education ===
Alfonso Vallejo was born in Santander, Cantabria, Spain, in 1943. Between 1950 and 1961, Alfonso Vallejo was studying for both the French baccalauréat and the Spanish bachillerato at the Liceo Francés in Madrid.

After hearing a teacher, Mr. Bihoreau, read in class from “Invitation au voyage” by Baudelaire, Alfonso Vallejo understood that in this work one could find whatever is missing in life. From this moment onwards, his life took a new meaning: to write and create action and painting through words; to understand what makes man.

In 1958 Alfonso Vallejo spent the summer in Ushaw-Moor (Durham, UK), in 1962 in Darlington (UK) and in 1963 in London. He also spent some time living in France, Germany, Britain and Italy and can read and write the respective languages of these countries. Alfonso Vallejo has also worked in different hospitals in France, Britain, Germany, Belgium and Denmark.

Between 1961 and 1966 Alfonso Vallejo studied and obtained his medical degree from the Universidad Complutense de Madrid. In 1968 he sat for the Foreign Medical Examination (ECFMG) to work in the USA. In 1970, Alfonso Vallejo finished his specialization in neurology and in 1977 presented his doctoral thesis in medicine at the Universidad Autónoma de Madrid.

=== Medical career ===
Alfonso Vallejo was an assistant professor of neurology for Dr Portera at the Clinico Hospital, Madrid from 1971–1973. In 1973 he was appointed head of Clinical Neurology (Neurology, Dr. Portera), at a leading Hospital in Madrid.

Between 1975 and 1985 Alfonso Vallejo was associate professor of neurology at the Universidad Complutense de Madrid. Through a public examination in 1985, Alfonso Vallejo obtained the title of Professor of Medical Pathology. He still occupied these positions at the same hospital.

During his stays abroad, from 1966 to 1977 Alfonso Vallejo worked with a number of renowned specialists in Heidelberg, London, Amberes, Copenhagen, Berlin and Paris.

=== Artistic career ===
Alfonso Vallejo started writing poems and plays in 1957. His first play was "Cycle" (1961) which he directed in 1963 with French actors at the French Institute in Madrid.

Director of the University Theatre, at the Faculty of Medicine, Universidad Complutense de Madrid, between 1962 and 1964.

Some of the plays written between 1961 and 1973: “La sal de la tierra”, “El Bernardo”, “La Mentala”, “El Rodrigüello”, “Morituri”, “Los toros de Guisando”, “El Tiznao”, “El desterrado” (The Salt of the earth), El Bernardo, La Mentala, El Rodrigüello, Morituri ("We who are about to die"), The Bull of Guisando,(Exile).

Unpublished plays written after 1973: “Passion- time” (in French) (1974), “Night-Syndrome”(1980), “Angustias”(1981) (Anguishes), "Mamuts” (1982) (Mammoths).

The author of two unpublished long novels and some short novels.

Alfonso Vallejo developed his artistic career by skillfully mastering how to write plays and poetry and how to paint.

=== International recognition ===
Some of Alfonso Vallejo's works have been translated into English, French, German, Arabic, Italian, Portuguese, Polish, and Bulgarian and continue to be translated. He was awarded the runner-up prize of the Lope de Vega Prize in 1975 for his play “Acido Sulfúrico”, the National Lope de Vega Prize in 1976 for his play “El Desgüace”, the International Tirso de Molina Prize in 1978 for “A tumba abierta” and the Fastenrath de la Real Academia Española Prize (Fastenrath Prize of the Royal Spanish Academy, 1981) for "El Cero Transparente", which was the libretto for the opera Kiu (1973) by Luis de Pablo. Alfonso Vallejo's plays have been performed in New York, Miami, Mexico and South American countries, Portugal, United Kingdom, France, Germany, Italy, and Poland.

== Awards ==
- Runner-up prize of the Premio Lope de Vega 1975 for Ácido Sulfúrico (1975)
- Premio Lope de Vega 1976 for El desguace (1974)
- Premio Internacional Tirso de Molina 1978 for A Tumba Abierta (1976)
- Premio Fastenrath de la Real Academia 1981 for El Cero Transparente (1977)

== Works ==
=== Plays ===
Vallejo is the author of about fifty plays and some of the most notable are: Fly-By (1973); Passion-time, escrita en francés (1974); El desgüace (1974); Psss (1974); Ácido sulfúrico (1975); Latidos (1975); A tumba abierta (1976); Monólogo para seis voces sin sonido (1976); El cero transparente (1977); Premio Fastenraht de la Real Academia (1980), y que constituyó el libreto de la ópera Kiu (1983) de Luis de Pablo; Eclipse (1977); Infratonos (1978); La espalda del círculo (1978); Cangrejos de pared (1979); Night-Syndrome (1980); Angustias (1981); Hölderlin (1981); Orquídeas y panteras (1982); Mamuts (1982); Gaviotas subterráneas (1983); Sol ulcerado (1983); Monkeys (1984); Week-end (1985); Espacio interior (1986); Tuatú (1989); Tobi-después (1991; Crujidos (1995); Kora (1996); Jindama (1998); Ébola Nerón (1999); Panic (2001); Greta en la confesión (2001); La inmolación, monólogo corto (2002); Hiroshima-Sevilla (2002); Jasmín, monólogo corto (2003); Culpable¿ (2003); Soraya, monólogo corto (2004); Katacumbia (2004); Irstel, monólogo corto (2005); Una nueva mujer (2006); El escuchador de hielo (2006).

=== Paintings: solo art exhibitions ===
- Madrid (1983, 1988, 1992, 1997)
- Zaragoza (1991)
- Aranjuez (2004)
- Aranjuez (2005)
- Alcorcón (2007)
- Madrid (28 February 2008)
- Cuenca (July–August 2008)
- Cuenca (November 2009)

=== Published works ===
==== Plays ====
- El cero transparente, Ácido sulfúrico, El desguace. Fundamentos, 1978. Prologue: José Monleón.
- Monólogo para seis voces sin sonido, Infratonos, A tumba abierta. Fundamentos, 1979. Prologue: Miguel Bilbatúa.
- Cangrejos de pared, Latidos, Eclipse. De la Torre, 1980. Prologue: Enrique Llovet.
- Monkeys, Gaviotas subterráneas. Fundamentos, 1985. Prologue: Ángel Fernández Santos.
- Gabbiani sotterranei (Gaviotas subterráneas). Teatro Spagnolo Contemporaneo, Second Volume. Edizioni dell'Orso. Emilio Coco.
- Orquídeas y panteras. Preyson, 1985.
- Fly-by, Sol ulcerado. La Avispa, Colección Teatro. n.º 21.
- Slaughter (Latidos). The Scene, n.º 4. Nueva York, 1977.
- A tumba abierta. Translated to Bulgarian by Stephan Tanev. Anthology of Contemporary Authors. Sofia (Bulgaria).
- Espacio interior, Week-end. Fundamentos, 1987. Prologue: Enrique Llovet.
- A tumba abierta. Biblioteca Antonio Machado, 1988.
- La espalda del círculo. Universidad de Murcia, 1988. Prologue: Alfonso Vallejo.
- El cero transparente. Translated to Polish by Ursula Aszyk. Dialog, n.º 6, 1987.
- Hölderlin. First Act, n.º 205.
- Tobi-después. Theatrical Art, n.º 3, 1991.
- Train to Kiu (El cero transparent). Translation by Rick Hite. Foreign, Contemporary Spanish Play, 1995.
- Crujidos. Fundamentos, 1996. Prologue: Ursula Aszyk.
- Túatu. Fundamentos, 1996. Prologue: Ursula Aszyk.
- Kora. Bookshop Antonio Machado, 1998.
- Jindama. Alhulia, 1998. Prologue: César Oliva.
- Ebola Nerón. ESAD de Murcia, 1999. Prologue: María Francisca Vilches de Frutos.
- Panic. Avispa, 2001. Prologue: Francisco Gutiérrez Carbajo.
- Greta en la confesión. AAT/Teatro, 2001.
- La inmolación. En Maratón de Monólogos, 2002. AAT/Teatro.
- Hiroshima-Sevilla. 6A. AAT/Teatro, 2003. Prologue: Enrique LLovet.
- Jasmin. En Maratón de Monólogos, 2003. AAT/Teatro.
- Soraya. En Maratón de Monólogos, 2004. AAT/Teatro.
- Irstel. En Maratón de Monólogos, 2005. AAT/Teatro.
- Katacumbia. University of Alcalá de Henares. Prologue: Mar Rebollo Calzada.
- Monólogo para seis voces sin sonido, Infratonos, A tumba abierta. Translated to Arabic by Khaled Salem and Ranya Rabbat. Cairo University, 2005.
- ¿Culpable? Psss. Ediciones Dauro. Editor José Rienda. Granada (2005). and Prologue: Francisco Gutiérrez Carbajo.
- Un nueva mujer. Ediciones Dauro, n.º 111, Granada. Collection Edited by José Rienda. and Prologue: Francisco Gutiérrez Carbajo.
- El escuchador de hielo. AAT, 2007. Prologue: Francisco Gutiérrez Carbajo.
  1. "Ka-OS". El Teatro de Papel. nº 13, 1/2011. Primer Acto.
  2. "Duetto (Diez asaltos y un desliz, para un actor y una actriz) (2013)Edición y prólogo Francisco Gutiérrez Carbajo
  3. "Tiempo de indignación" (2013)Edición y prólogo: Francisco Gutiérrez Carbajo

==== Poetry ====
(Books are in Spanish, but the title is given in English for convenience.)

- The First Poems. (written between 1957 and 1963)
- The place of the cold land: Publisher Ágora (1969) Madrid
- Molecules: Publisher Castilla (1976) Madrid
- Lunar Fire: Publisher Ayuso. Colección Endimión (1988) Madrid
- More: Publisher Endymión. (1990) Madrid
- Interior flesh: Publisher Libertarias (1994) Madrid
- Materica light: Publisher Libertarias/Prodhufi.(1994)
- Clarity in action: Publisher Huerga y Fierro (1995). Madrid (Prologue by Francisco Nieva)
- Blue Sun: Publisher Huerga y Fierro (1997). Madrid (Prologue by Carlos Bousoño)
- End of the century and fear propagation: Publisher Alhulia (1999). Salobreña. Granada. (Prologue by Oscar Barrero Pérez)
- Eternity at every instant: Publisher Huerga and Fierro (2000) Madrid (Edition and Prologue by Francisco Gutiérrez Carbajo)
- White darkness: Publisher Huerga and Fierro. Madrid 2001. Edition and prologue by Francisco Gutiérrez Carbajo Madrid
- To be Plutonic: Publisher Huerga y Fierro. (2002). Edition and prologue Francisco Gutiérrez Carbajo. Madrid
- Astral Compass: Publisher Huerga y Fierro (2003). Edition and Prologue: Francisco Gutiérrez Carbajo. Madrid
- Labyrinths-Investigation 40. Orso. Bari, Italy. Emilio Coco. In “I Quaderni Di Abanico” (2003). Translated by Emilio Coco. Italian anthology of poetry with selections from the last fourteen books. :Publisher Levante. Bari. Prologue: Francisco Gutiérrez Carbajo
- Trans consciousness and desire: Publisher Huerga and Fierro. (2004). Edition and prologue: Francisco Gutiérrez Carbajo. Madrid
- Escence and Prereality: Publisher Huerga and Fierro. Edition and Prologue: Francisco Gutiérrez Carbajo. Madrid (2005)
- Instinct intuition and Truth: Publisher Huerga and Fierro. Edition and prologue: Francisco Gutiérrez Carbajo
- Fantasy and Injustice: Publisher Huerta and Fierro (2006). Edition and prologue by Francisco Gutiérrez Carbajo
- “Twilight zone, quimeria and passion”: Publisher Huerga and Fierro. Edition January 2008. Edition and prologue by Francisco Gutiérrez Carbajo. Enigma y develación. Ed. Huerga y Fierro, 2009. Edición y prólogo: Francisco Gutiérrez Carbajo.
  1. Transvivencia y plenitud. Ed. Huerga y Fierro, 2010. Edición y prólogo: Francisco Gutiérrez Carbajo.
  2. " Tiempo silencio y verdad". Ed. Huerga y Fierro, 2011. Edición y Prólogo: Francisco Gutiérrez Carbajo.
  3. "Avventura-Verità." (en I Quaderni Di Abanico). Italia. Bari. Traducción de Emilio Coco. Antología de poesía traducida al italiano. 2011. Edición y prólogo: Francisco Gutiérrez Carbajo.
  4. "Ser, cerebro y realidad". Ed. Huerga y Fierro,2012. Edicion y prólogo: Francisco Gutiérrez Carbajo.
  5. "Utopía y realidad". Impreso en Nuevo Zorita S.L (2012). Edición y prólogo: Francisco Gutiérrez Carbajo.
  6. "Sin principio ni final". Ed. Infocultiva Libros. (2013). Edición y prógo: Francisco Gutiérrez Carbajo.
  7. "Homo ciber digitalis". Ed. Infocultiva Libros (2013). Edición y prólogo: Francisco Gutiérrez Carbajo.
  8. "Homo ciber digitalis" (2013). Edición y prólogo: Francisco Gutiérrez Carbajo
  9. "Magnitud y dimensión" (2013). Edición y prólogo: Francisco Gutiérrez Carbajo
  10. "Aire, tierra, mar y... sueños" (2014). Editorial Abey. Edición y prólogo: Francisco Gutiérrez Carbajo
- "Después" Alfonso Vallejo (2020). Edición y prólogo Francisco Gutiérrez Carbajo
