= Caterina Albert =

Catalan writer

Caterina Albert i Paradís
- Born: 11 September 1869
- Died: 27 January 1966 (aged 96)
- Writing career
- Pen name: Víctor Català
- Language: Spanish, Catalan
- Notable work: Solitud (Solitude) (1905)
- Literary movement: Modernisme

Caterina Albert i Paradís (L'Escala, Spain, 11 September 1869 — 27 January 1966), better known by her pen name Víctor Català, was a Catalan writer in Catalan and Spanish who participated in the Modernisme movement and was the author of one of the signature works of the genre, Solitud (Solitude) (1905). Her literary skill was first recognized in 1898, when she received the Jocs Florals (floral games) prize; soon thereafter, she began using the pseudonym Victor Català, taking it from the protagonist of a novel she never finished. Despite her success as a dramatist and her forays into poetry, she is best known for her work in narrative literature, with the force of her style and the richness of her diction being especially noted. She died in her hometown of l’Escala, Catalonia, in 1966 and is interred in the Cementiri Vell de l’Escala.

== Biography ==
=== Early years and modernism ===
She began her literary career very young, collaborating with l’Almanach de L'Esquella de la Torratxa. This satirical publication featured her first writings—romantic poems under the pen name Virigili d’Alacseal—between 1897 and 1900.

Around this time she received the Jocs Florals d’Olot prize (a prize given during the Catalan St George’s Day) for her poems “Lo llibre nou” (the new book) and the monologue “La infanticida” (infanticide). A small scandal erupted when the jury learned that the author of the latter, an especially poignant work of theater, was a young girl from l’Escala, and so from that point forward Albert used the pseudonym Victor Català for all her writings.

Her first published book was the collection of poems Lo cant dels mesos (The Song of the Months) (1901). Albert had other vocations as well: she was a drawer, a painter and a sculptor. Unfortunately, this aspect of her talent never became part of her professional career: she was only featured in one exposition in her life, at the Cercle Artístic de Sant Lluc in December 1955.

It seems that as her literary career began to take off, she left her artistic aspirations behind. In 1901 she published her only collection of monologues, 4 Monòlegs, and began collaborating with the modernist magazine Joventut (1900–1906). This publication would serve as a platform to launch her into the public consciousness and advance her literary ambitions; in it, she wrote her first “rural dramas”, her darkest and most poignant narratives. In 1902 her book entitled Drames rurals (rural dramas) was published and the mystery of her pseudonym began to bring her fame. It was also during this time that she began her relationships with Narcís Oller and Joan Maragall. Using her pen name as a shield, she could write whatever pleased her, without any moral limits. Without “Víctor Català”, the criticism could return, as society still did not look favorably upon female authors.

In 1902 her fixation on the darker aspects of the human condition began to attract criticism. Soon thereafter, she published a collection of tales, Ombrívoles (1904) and a second collection of poems, Llibre Blanc (White Book) (1905). She also published several less dramatic narratives, as well as a few poems, in the magazine La Ilustració Catalana (The Catalan Enlightenment).

Her most famous work, Solitud (Solitude), was published in the pages of the magazine Joventut between 1904 and 1905. It was republished in the form of a book by the press Biblioteca Joventut in 1905, bringing the novel much recognition, and making Víctor Català a well-known writer. She published a collections of narratives, Caires vius, in 1907 and then began her first period of “literary silence”, due to the movement of noucentisme.

=== Second period (after 1907) ===
While in 1920 Albert published a collection of narratives, La Mare Balena, it was not until the end of noucentism in the mid-1920s that she released her second, and last, novel, Un film ("A Film") (1926). Throughout her career she was also linked to the Jocs Florals of Barcelona, presiding over the judging in 1917. She was also a member of the Academy of the Catalan Language (starting in 1915) and the Academy of Great Letters of Barcelona (starting in 1923). She won her second Englantina d’or (gold rose, the top prize) of the Jocs Florals de Barcelona with her poem Cavalls del port (Horses of the Port). She was also an active folklorist and even archaeologist, collecting and classifying Greek and Roman remnants. She fell into her second literary silence with the commencement of hostilities in the Spanish Civil War.

=== Postwar period ===
It was not until 1944 that Albert published another work—her first collection of stories in Spanish, Retablo (1944). Two years later she unveiled a collection of literary prose about domestic themes, “Mosaic” (1947), which became the first work reprinted in the Catalan edition of the publishing house Dalmau. A little while later she began her prolific relationship with the publisher Selecta, with whom she published “Vida Mòlta” (1950) and “Jubileu” (1951), her last collections of narratives, and finally her “Obres Completes” (Complete Works) (1951, 1972). After her death Selecta would rerelease her oeuvre.

== Literary works ==
Albert's literary career can be divided into three periods:

- Modernisme
  - "El cant dels mesos" (1901), collection of poems.
  - "Llibre Blanc-Policromi-Tríptic" (1905), collection of poems.
  - "Quatre monòlegs" (1901), collections of monologues.
  - "Drames rurals" (1902), collection of stories.
  - "Ombrívoles" (1904), collection of stories.
  - "Caires Vius" (1907), collection of stories.
  - "Solitud" (1905), novel.
- Second period: from 1907 until the Spanish Civil War
  - "La Mare-Balena" (1920), collection of stories.
  - "Un film 3.000 metres" (1926), novel.
  - "Marines" (1928), anthology.
  - "Contrallums" (1930), collection of stories.
- Postwar period
  - "Retablo" (1944), collection of stories in Spanish.
  - "Mosaic" (1946), collection of literary prose.
  - "Vida mòlta" (1950), collection of stories.
  - "Jubileu" (1951), collection of stories.
  - "Obres Completes" (1951).
  - "Obres Completes" (1972).

Within the period of modernism, as well as her entire literary career, Solitud must be especially noted, as it perfectly encapsulated Catalan modernism and is still her most recognizable work. The novel’s protagonist, Mila, is a woman who struggles against her social surrounding and for her own individuality. In 1909 the work won the premi Fastenrath, and has been translated into many languages.

== Bibliography ==
- Lluís ALBERT (ed.), Quincalla. Mil adagis per aprendre vocabulari, Edicions 62, Barcelona, 2005.
- Francesca BARTRINA, Caterina Albert/Víctor Català. La voluptuositat de l'escriptura, Eumo, Vic, 2001.
- Lurdes BOIX, Jordi BOIX, Els paisatges de Caterina Albert i Paradís, "Víctor Català". Un itinerari històric i literari a través dels indrets vinculats a l'escriptora de l'Escala, Ajuntament de l'Escala, 2005.
- Jordi CASTELLANOS, Víctor Català dins RIQUER/COMAS/MOLAS, Història de la literatura catalana, vol. 8., Barcelona, Ed. Ariel S.A., 1985, ps. 579-623.
- Jordi CASTELLANOS, Víctor Català, escriptora, dins Literatura, vides, ciutats, Universitària 6, Edicions 62, 1997, ps. 51-110.
- Jordi CASTELLANOS, "Solitud", novel·la modernista, Els Marges, núm. 25, 1982, Barcelona, ps. 45-70.
- DIVERSOS AUTORS,Actes de les primeres Jornades d'estudi sobre la vida i obra de Caterina Albert Paradís "Víctor Català" , L'Escala, 9-11 d'abril de 1992, a cura d'Enric Prat i Pep Vila. Ajuntament de l'Escala, PAM, Barcelona, 1993.
- DIVERSOS AUTORS, II Jornades d'estudi Vida i obra de Caterina Albert (Víctor Català), 1869-1966, L'Escala, 20, 21 i 22 de setembre 2001. Ajuntament de l'Escala, PAM, Barcelona, 2002.
- DIVERSOS AUTORS, Caterina Albert. Cent anys de la publicació de "Solitud", Simposi celebrat a la Residència d'Investigadors CSIC- Generalitat de Catalunya els dies 18 i 19 de novembre de 2005, Publicacions de la Residència d'Investigadors, 30, Barcelona, 2007.
- DIVERSOS AUTORS,Actes de les terceres jornades d'estudi sobre la vida i l'obra de Caterina Albert Paradís "Víctor Català" (en ocasió del centenari de "Solitud" 1905-2005. Edició a cura d'Enric Prat i Pep Vila, Curbet, Girona, 2006.
- Ricard GUANTER I FLAQUÉ, Caterina Albert i Paradís. "Víctor Català", vista per un escalenc. Allò que les biografies no diuen, Curbet, Girona, 2006.
- Josep MIRACLE, Caterina Albert i Paradís "Víctor Català" , Ed. DOPESA (Pinya de rosa, 30), 1979.
- Irene MUÑOZ I PAIRET (ed.), Epistolari de Víctor Català.(vol. I), Curbet, Girona, 2005.
- Núria NARDI, Víctor Català dins Història de la Literatura Catalana, Vol. II, Edicions 62, Barcelona, 1984, ps. 93-104.
- Joan OLLER I RABASSA, Biografia de Víctor Català, Rafael Dalmau, Barcelona, 1967.
