= Johannes Fastenrath =

German writer, translator and Hispanist (1839–1908)

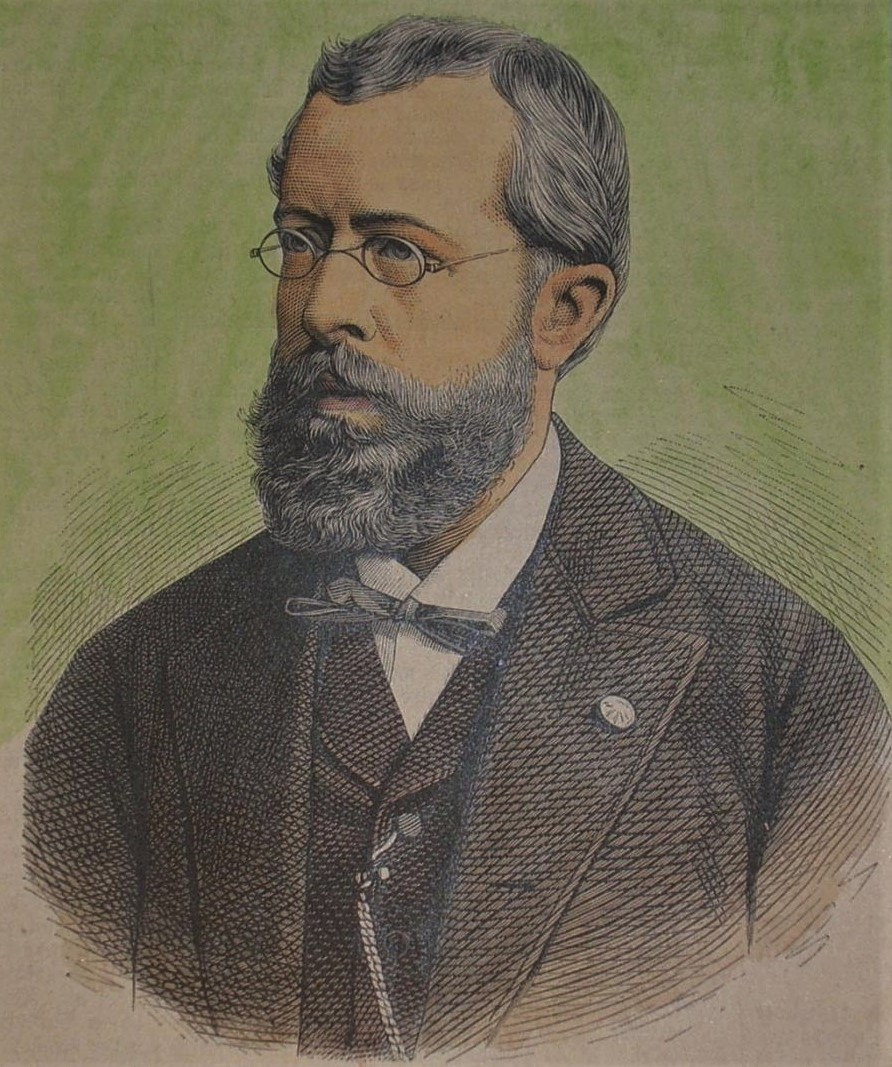
- Johannes Fastenrath (1877)
- Born: 3 May 1839; Remscheid
- Died: 16 March 1908 (aged 68); Cologne

Johannes Fastenrath (3 May 1839 – 16 March 1908) was a German writer, translator and Hispanist.

== Biography ==
He was born at Remscheid, and studied at the University of Bonn, Heidelberg University, the Ludwig-Maximilians-Universität München, the Friedrich Wilhelm University of Berlin, and the University of Paris.

He travelled extensively in Spain in 1864, 1869, and 1879, and wrote several works of verse in German after the Spanish manner: Ein spanischer Romanzenstrauss ("A Spanish bouquet of romances," 1866), Hesperische Blüten ("Hesperian blossoms," 1869), Immortellen aus Toledo ("Everlastings from Toledo", 1869); and in Das Buch meiner spanischen Freunde ("The book of my Spanish friends", 1870), he introduced to German readers the work of contemporary Spanish poets through translations of representative specimens. He translated into German Manuel Juan Diana's comedy La Receta contra las Suegras (German: Rezept gegen Schwiegermütter; "Recipe Against Mothers-in-Law"; 2nd ed., 1872).

His La Walhalla y las glorias de Alemania ("Valhalla and the glories of Germany," 1872-87) performed a reverse service, describing for Spanish benefit, under the guise of interesting essays, prominent German characters from the days of Hermann. His Pasionarias de un Alemán-Español ("Books of passion from a German-Spaniard") described the Oberammergau Passion Play. Numerous other original volumes and translations have in a scholarly manner familiarized Germans with much of Spanish literature and history.

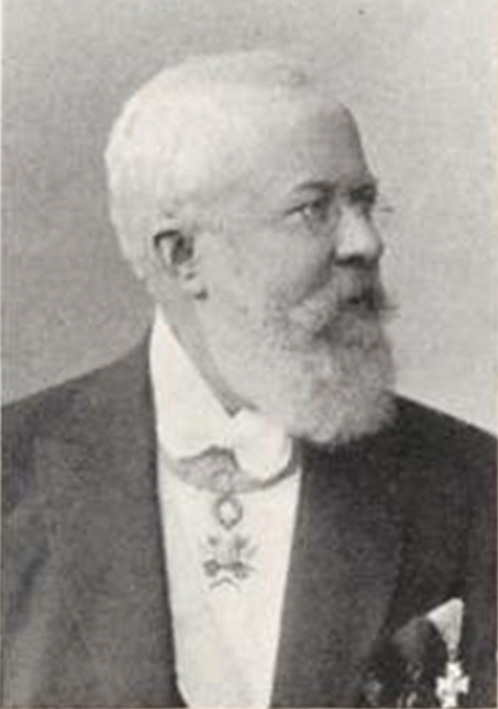
Johannes Fastenrath, 1904

He also wrote Den deutschen Helden von 1870 ("To the German Heroes of 1870"), a volume of war songs inspired by the Franco-Prussian War.

Fastenrath married Hungarian Luise (or Luisa) Goldmann (1858-1914), sister of writer Anna Forstenheim, a person who maintained the interests and memory of her husband. In 1889 she was named queen of the Floral Games of Barcelona. In 1909, with the legacy of her husband, she instituted two foundations that bear her name, the "Fundación Premio Fastenrath" and the "Premi Fastenrath", which reward writers for creative works in Spanish language and Catalan language, respectively.
