= Anna Forstenheim =

Austrian writer and poet (1836–1889)

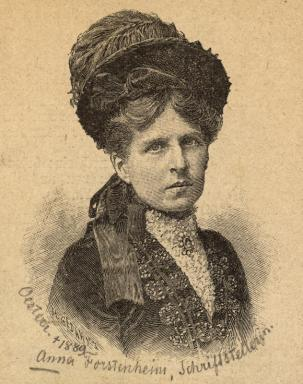
- Born: Anna Hirschler; 21 September 1836; Agram, Kingdom of Croatia, Austrian Empire
- Died: 19 October 1889 (aged 53); Bad Vöslau, Cisleithania, Austria-Hungary
- Resting place: Vienna Central Cemetery
- Spouse: Samuel Hirschler (later Georg Forstenheim)
- Writing career
- Language: German

Anna Goldmann Hirschler-Forstenheim (21 September 1836 in Agram – 19 October 1889 in Bad Vöslau) was an Austrian writer and poet.

== Biography ==
She was born to Jewish parents Rosine (née Hirschler) and Moshe (Moritz) Goldmann in Agram, Croatia. She learned to read and write from her mother, and was later sent to a private secondary school for girls.

In 1867, she moved to Vienna and married banker and railway entrepreneur Samuel (later Georg) Hirschler, with whom she bore three children, Klara (1868), Dorothea (1869), and Otto Israel (1872). There she founded the Society of Women Writers and Artists (German: Vereins der Schriftstellerinnen und Künstlerinnen), of which she was the treasurer. Soon after her sister Luise's marriage to German Hispanist Johannes Fastenrath in 1881, she and her family left the Jewish community, converted to Roman Catholicism, and changed their surname to Forstenheim.

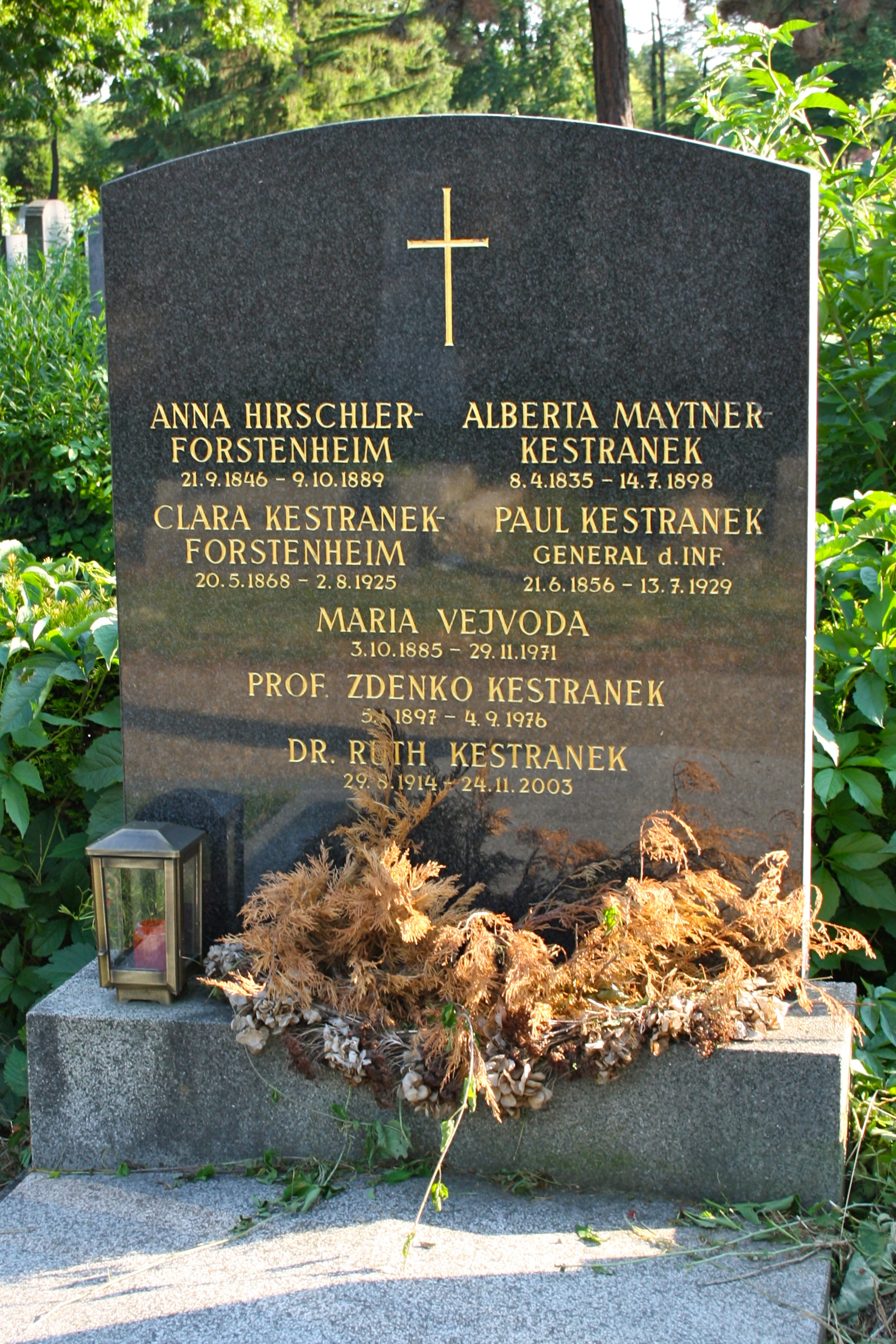
Grave of Anna Forstenheim at the Vienna Central Cemetery

Her son Otto died at the Łódź Ghetto in the Holocaust in December 1941.

== Publications ==
Forstenheim's first-known published work was Caterina Cornaro (1875), a historical drama in five acts on the life of the last monarch of Cyprus. She was also a regular contributor to various magazines, such as Bazar, the Gartenlaube, the Neuen Freien Presse, the Wiener Hausfrauen-Zeitung, the Berner Bund, and the Straßburger Zeitung.

=== Partial works ===
- Caterina Cornaro. Historisches Drama in 5 Aufzügen. Vienna: Wallishausser'schen Buchhandlung. 1875.
- Der Zauberring des Herzens. Roman in drei Bänden. Leipzig: Friedrich. 1880.
- Die schöne Melusine. Märchen in zwölf Gesängen (zu M. v. Schwind's Aquarellen-Cyclus). Stuttgart: Verlag von Paul Neff. 1881.
- Ein neues Fürstenthum in Alter Zeit. 1882.
- Der Wau-Wau. Lustspiel in zwei Aufzügen. Vienna: Selbstverlag. 1882.
- Prinz Tantalus. Erzählung. Berlin: Janke. 1882.
- Manoli. Rumänische Volkssage erzählt. Vienna: Verlag von Carl Konegen. 1883.
- Lieder der Huldigung. Temesvar: Uhrmann. 1898.
