= Maria Assumpció Soler i Font =

Maria Assumpció Soler i Font (Girona, 22 April 1913 – Girona, 24 March 2004) was a Catalan writer and journalist. She was forced by linguistic repression under Franco to write in Spanish. While her articles were in Spanish, she published in the Journal of Gerona the first poem in Catalan language, "Thanksgiving".

== Biography ==
In her youth she was influenced by her uncle, an Esperantist and Catalanist. She was greatly affected by the execution of Joan Font in 1936 and the disappearance of her brother during the Spanish Civil War.

== Selected works ==
- Les cinc branques (1975).Various Authors. Engordany (Andorra): Editorial Esteve Albert i Corp. ISBN 978-8440084071
- L' escollit (2005), Editorial Associació Suport a la Dona de Palafrugell. Edition of the 1959 award-winning work with the Fastenrath Award for Novel in the Floral Games of the Catalan Language in Exile, which had been unpublished. ISBN 84-609-4395-X
- Poems and more than 350 stories and articles published in : Gerunda, Educación y Cultura, Los Sitios, Revista de Girona, Presència i Punt Diari.
