= Adolfo Reyes =

Spanish writer

Adolfo Reyes C. Guillot (4 February 1890 – 26 March 1968) was a Spanish journalist, novelist, essayist and playwright. He was the son of the famous writer from Málaga, Arturo Reyes and Carmen Conejo. Primarily self-taught, he learned several foreign languages, including Latin, Greek, Arabic and German, but worked most of the time as a clerk, journalist and educator, participating in the foundations of a series of local cultural institutions. His writings, characteristic for their elegant style and gentle irony, cover the genres of short story, novel, essay, memoir and drama.

== Works ==
=== Novels ===
- Las Cenizas del Sándalo (1916)
- El Carro de Asalto (1922)

=== Essays ===
- Ensayos moriscos (1936)
- Ideario en estampas (1947)

=== Theater ===
- Peranzul
- Don Lope de Sosa
- Tragedia de villanos
- La Danzarina y el Flautista
- Idilio antiguo
