= Josep Yxart =

Spanish literary critic, essayist and translator (1852–1895)

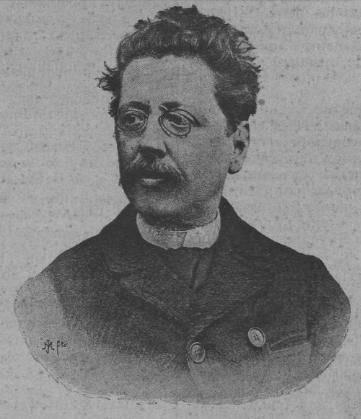
Josep Yxart i de Moragas in 1895

Josep Yxart (1852–1895) was a Spanish literary critic, essayist and translator from Tarragona, Catalonia. He was an important figure in the Renaixença movement.

He translated to Spanish works by Friedrich von Schiller. Joan Sardà i Lloret and Narcís Oller were his pupils, and he also encouraged Joan Maragall, Santiago Rusiñol and Raimon Casellas to write.

== Works ==
- Lo teatre català. Assaig històric-crític (1878)
- Fortuny (1881)
- El arte escénico en España (1894-1896)
- Obres catalanes de Josep Ixart (1896), compilation by Narcís Oller
