= Enrique de Mesa =

Spanish poet & theatre critic (1878–1929)

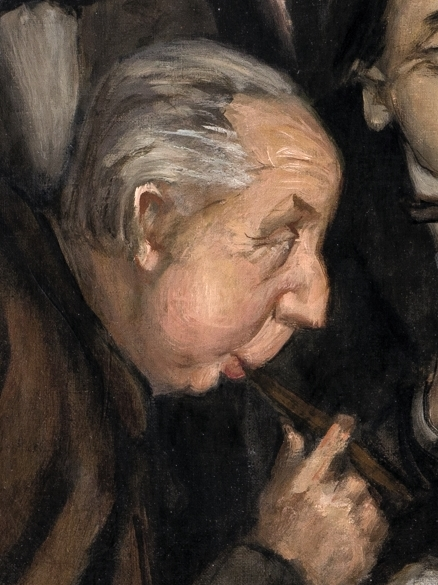
Enrique de Mesa

Enrique de Mesa y Rosales (April 9, 1878 - May 27, 1929) was a Spanish poet and theatre critic belonging to the Generation of '98, although others classify him within the post-modernism of the early 20th century. He contributed to El Imparcial as a theatre critic.
