= Arturo Reyes (writer) =

Spanish writer, journalist, and poet

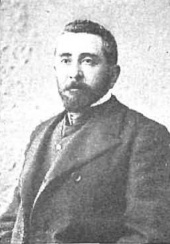

Arturo Reyes Aguilar (September 29, 1864 – June 17, 1913) was a Spanish writer, journalist and poet from Málaga.

== Biography ==
Reyes is the son of Manuel Reyes y Gil and Josefina Aguilar Adelardo.

In 1866, when he was two years old, his mother left the family and went to live in Barcelona taking away with her solely Arturo's older brother Adelardo; in 1876 Arturo's father died.

Arturo Reyes married in 1893 to Carmen Conejo Guillot and they had six children; three of them died young. Arturo Reyes' son Adolfo Reyes (1890 – 1968) also became a writer, mostly known for his modernist prose collection Las cenizas del sandalo ("Sandalwood Ashes", 1916) and his book Ensayos morscos ("Moorish Essays", 1936).

The financial situation of the family was not stable and with the assistance of Francisco Verdugo and other journalists state support was assured.

Arturo Reyes often worked with newspapers as "Correo de Andalucía" and "El Cronista" but he is best known as a writer of poetry and prose fiction. Some prose works of his were published in the series "El Cuento Semanal".

He wrote highly emotive poetry but gained respect chiefly for his novels Cartucherita (1897) and La Goletera (1900). He also wrote hundreds of short stories among which Cuentos andaluces ("Andalucian Stories", 1901) can be outlined. Desde el surco (1896) remains as one of his most important collections of poetry.

His style is related with the personal interpretation of the contemporary literary ideas of romanticism and costumbrismo, with realistic overtones that also reflect the inquiries of the modern individual.

In 1911, Arturo Reyes and Ricardo Leon were awarded the prize Fastenrath for their poetic collection Béticas (1910) and he became a correspondent of the Royal Spanish Academy.

As a person, he is remembered like an emotional one, enthusiastic and humble at the same time. In his works one can find reflected also both his spontaneity and profundity, while also revealing a persistent more melancholic side of his character. He was an admired friend of Benito Pérez Galdós, Rafael Cansinos-Asséns, Juan Valera and he kept a relation also with Alcalá Galiano, José María de Pereda, Ricardo León, Gaspar Núñez de Arce, Jacinto Benavente, Ramiro de Maeztu, Alejandro Sawa, Salvador Rueda, Manuel Altolaguirre and Rubén Darío.

Arturo Reyes had an unspecified severe intestine illness since his youth, considered the reason for his general exhaustion and demise. Anticipating his untimely death, a few days earlier he finished his last book of poetry Del Crepusculo (1913) with the words:

Today, while I'm preparing this last volume of poetry, which, if published, if it comes to be published, will surely arrive after God has already put an end to my so battered existence […]. While you are reading this pages, I will probably be sleeping the dream of eternity […]

In 1964 a bust of Arthuro Reyes by the sculptor Adriano Risueno was set up in the Málaga Park.

== Works ==
=== Prose ===
- El sargento Pelayo (1888)
- Cartucherita (1897)
- El lugar de la viñuela (1898)
- La Goletera (1900)
- ¡Estaba escrito! (1900)
- Cuentos andaluces (1901)
- Del bulto a la Coracha (1902)
- La Maruchita (1907)
- Las del Pinto (1908)
- La Miraflores (1909)
- Cielo azul (1910)
- El del Rocío (1911)
- Sangre gitana (1911)
- Sangre torera (1912)
- Entre breñas (1913)

=== Poetry ===
- Ráfagas (1889)
- Íntimas (1891)
- Otoñales (1904)
- Béticas (1910)
- Romances Andaluces (1912)
- Del crepúsculo (1914)
