= National Poetry Award (Spain) =

- Awarded for: Work of poetry by a Spanish author in any Spanish language
- Sponsored by: Ministry of Culture
- Date: 1922–1973; 1977–present
- Country: Spain
- Reward: €20,000
- Website: Official website

The National Award for Literature in the Poetry Category (Spanish: Premio Nacional de Literatura en la Modalidad de Poesía) has been presented annually by the Ministry of Culture of Spain since 1977.

It recognizes the best work of poetry by a Spanish author, in any of the Spanish languages. Works are nominated by a jury of experts, and must be first editions published in Spain in the prior year. It includes a monetary prize of €20,000.

Its antecedent was the National Literature Contest in the Poetry Category (Spanish: Concurso Nacional de Literatura en la Modalidad de Poesía), part of national contests established by Royal Order of the Ministry of Public Instruction and Fine Arts of 27 September 1922. It was given from 1924 to 1973.

== List of winners ==
=== 1st era: National Literature Contest in the Poetry Category ===
- 1925 – Rafael Alberti, for Marinero en tierra
- 1927 – Dámaso Alonso, for El viento y el verso
- 1933 – Adriano del Valle, for Mundo sin tranvías
- 1934 – Vicente Aleixandre, for La destrucción o el amor
- 1937 – Antonio Sánchez Barbudo, for Entre dos fuegos
- 1938 – Emilio Prados, for Destino fiel
- 1949 – Leopoldo Panero, for Escrito a cada instante
- 1950 – José María Valverde, for La espera
- 1951 – José García Nieto, for Tregua, and Alfonsa de la Torre, for Oratorio de San Bernardino
- 1952 – Dionisio Ridruejo, for En once años. Poesías completas de juventud
- 1953 – Luis Rosales, for Rimas
- 1954 – José Hierro, for Antología
- 1955 – Jorge Campos, for Tiempo Pasado
- 1957 – José García Nieto, for Geografía es amor
- 1959 – Rafael Laffón, for Rama ingrata
- 1960 – José Luis Prado Nogueira, for Miserere en la tumba de R. N.
- 1962 – Manuel Alcántara, for Ciudad de entonces
- 1963 – Eladio Cabañero, for Marisa Sabia y otros poemas
- 1965 – Alfonso Canales, for Aminadab
- 1966 – Pere Gimferrer, for Arde el mar
- 1967 – Carmen Conde, for Obra poética
- 1968 – Diego Jesús Jiménez, for Coro de ánimas
- 1970 – Carlos Murciano, for Este claro silencio
- 1971 – Francisco Garfias López, for La Duda
- 1972 – Manuel Ríos Ruiz, for El Oboe
- 1973 – Ángel García López, for Elegía en Astaroth

=== 2nd era: National Award for Literature in the Poetry Category ===
- 1977 – Miguel Fernández, for Eros y Anteros
- 1978 – Félix Grande, for Las rubáiyatas de Horacio Martín
- 1979 – Leopoldo de Luis, for Igual que guantes grises
- 1980 – Carlos Sahagún, for Primer y último oficio
- 1981 – Vicente Gaos, for Última Thule
- 1982 – Antonio Colinas, for Poesía, 1967–1981
- 1983 – Claudio Rodríguez, for Desde mis poemas
- 1984 – (not given)
- 1985 – Joan Vinyoli, for Passeig d'aniversari
- 1986 – (not given)
- 1987 – Francisco Brines, for El otoño de las rosas
- 1988 – Antonio Gamoneda, for Edad
- 1989 – Pere Gimferrer, for El vendaval
- 1990 – Carlos Bousoño, for Metáfora del desafuero
- 1991 – Luis Álvarez Piñer, for En resumen, 1927–1988
- 1992 – Basilio Fernández López, for Poemas 1927–1987
- 1993 – José Ángel Valente, for No amanece el cantor
- 1994 – Rafael Guillén, for Los estados transparentes
- 1995 – Luis García Montero, for Habitaciones separadas
- 1996 – Felipe Benítez Reyes, for Vidas improbables
- 1997 – Diego Jesús Jiménez, for Itinerario para náufragos
- 1998 – José Antonio Muñoz Rojas, for Objetos perdidos
- 1999 – José Hierro, for Cuaderno de Nueva York
- 2000 – Guillermo Carnero, for Verano inglés
- 2001 – José Ángel Valente, for Fragmentos de un libro futuro
- 2002 – Carlos Marzal, for Metales pesados
- 2003 – Julia Uceda, for En el viento, hacia el mar
- 2004 – Chantal Maillard, for Matar a Platón
- 2005 – José Corredor-Matheos, for El don de la ignorancia
- 2006 – José Manuel Caballero Bonald, for Manual de infractores
- 2007 – Olvido García Valdés, for Y todos estábamos vivos
- 2008 – Joan Margarit, for Casa de Misericordia
- 2009 – Juan Carlos Mestre, for La casa roja
- 2010 – José María Millares, for Cuadernos, 2000–2009
- 2011 – Francisca Aguirre, for Historia de una anatomía
- 2012 – Antonio Carvajal, for Un girasol flotante
- 2013 – Manuel Álvarez Torneiro, for Os ángulos da brasa (written in Galician)
- 2014 – Antonio Hernández Ramírez, for Nueva York después de muerto
- 2015 – Luis Alberto de Cuenca, for Cuaderno de Vacaciones
- 2016 – Ángeles Mora, for Ficciones para una autobiografía
- 2017 – Julio Martínez Mesanza, for Gloria
- 2018 – Antònia Vicens, for Tots els cavalls
- 2019 – Pilar Pallarés, for Tempo fósil
- 2020 – Olga Novo, for Feliz Idade
- 2021 – Miren Agur Meabe, for Nola gorde errautsak kolkoan (Cómo guardar ceniza en el pecho) (written in Basque)
- 2022 – Aurora Luque, for Un número finito de veranos
- 2023 - Yolanda Castaño for Materia
- 2024 - María Jesús Pato Díaz for Sonora
- 2025 - Miriam Reyes for Con
