= Miren Agur Meabe =

Basque writer (born 1962)

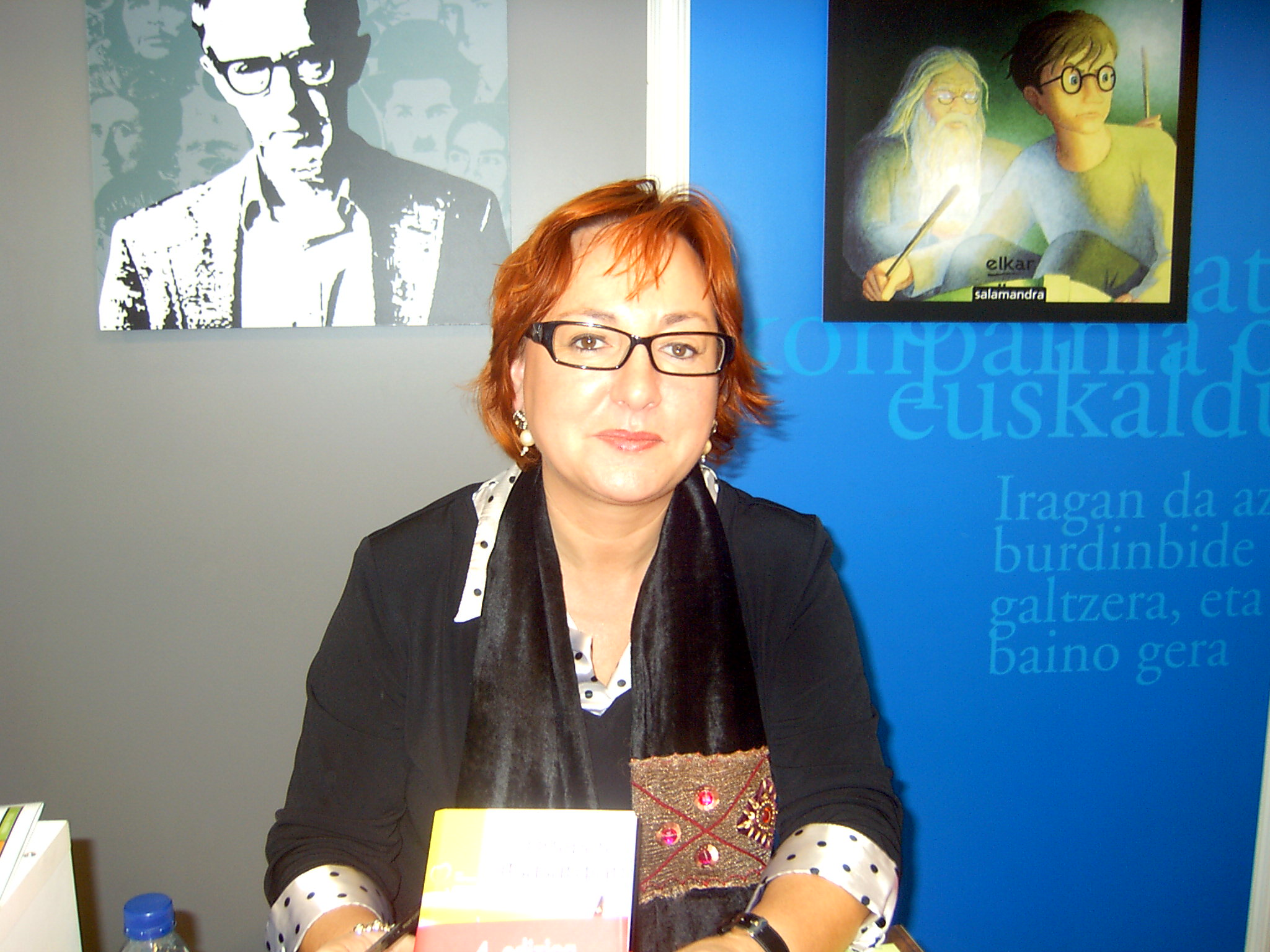
- Meabe in 2007
- Born: 7 October 1962 (age 63); Lekeitio, Spain
- Citizenship: Spain
- Occupations: Writer, translator
- Writing career
- Language: Basque
- Notable awards: Premio de la Crítica (2001, 2011); National Poetry Award (2021)

Miren Agur Meabe Plaza (born 1962) is a Basque poet, prose writer, author of books for children and young adults and a translator. In 2021, she was the first author to win the Spanish Ministry of Culture's National Poetry Award for a work in Basque.

== Early life and education ==
Miren Agur Meabe was born on 7 October 1962, in Lekeitio, Spain. She studied teaching and Basque philology, then for some time worked as a teacher in Bilbao.

== Career ==
For years, Miren Agur Meabe worked as a publisher, heading de Basque office of the Giltza-Edebé publishing house. Later, she quit publishing to focus on writing. She writes poetry, books for children and young adults, but has also published fiction for adults. She had stated that her earliest poetry work was based on copying the style of Rosalía de Castro, as she was the only female poet that appeared in university textbooks at the time.

For her literary work, Meabe has won a number of awards, such as the Lasarte-Oria town council prize for the poetry tome Oi hondarrezko emaikaitz (1991), three Euskadi Literature Prizes for young adult novels Itsaslabarreko etxea (2002), Urtebete itsasargian (2006) and Errepidea (2011) and two Premio de la Crítica awards for poetry books Azalaren kodea (2001) and Bitsa eskuetan (2011). Her children's book Mila magnolia-lore (2010) was included in the IBBY Honour List. In 2021, she was the awarded the National Poetry Prize for Nola gorde errautsa kolkoan. She was the first author to win the prize with a work in Basque.

Meabe also works as a translator into Basque. She has translated works by such authors as Forough Farrokhzad or Scholastique Mukasonga, and received the Vitoria-Gasteiz Translation Prize twice.

She is a member of the Euskaltzaindia.

== Bibliography ==
- El código de la piel (The Skin Code), 2000, Bassarai Editions
- La casa del acantilado (The House On The Cliff), 2001, Edebé
- Vivo en dos casas (I Live In Two Houses), 2003, Editores asociados
- Cómo corregir a una maestra malvada (How To Correct An Evil Teacher), 2003, Edebé
- Supositorios para el lobo (Suppositories For The Wolf), 2006, Edebé
- Un año en el faro (A Year In The Lighthouse), 2006, Lóguez Ediciones
- Una estrella en la sopa (A Star In The Soup), 2008, Edebé
- ¿Qué es el amor, sino... ? (What is love, if not...?), 2011, Lóguez Ediciones
- La carretera (Road), 2012, Erein Argitaletxea
- Zisnea eta uhartea (The Swan and the Island), 2013, Elkar
- Timuti jirafa (Timuti Giraffe), 2013, Elkar
- Hartz marmartia (Grumbling Bear), 2014, Elkar
- Pinpiriñe, 2014, Elkar
- Izar-Lapurra (The Star Thief), 2014, Elkar
- Kristalezko begi bat (A Glass Eye), 2014, Pamiela (translated from Basque by Amaia Gabantxo, 2017)
- Ros, 2015, Lóguez Ediciones
- Pase al anochecer (Pass At Dusk), 2016, Hualde Alfaro
- Tximeletak (Butterflies), 2016, Elkar
- Espuma en las manos (Foam In Hands), 2017, Ediciones Trea
- Katta adarbakarra, 2021, Elkar
- Quema de huesos (Burning Bones), 2021, Consonni
- Cómo guardar ceniza en el pecho (How To Keep Ashes On Your Chest), 2021, Bartleby Editores
- Desberdinen kluba (Club of the Different), 2022, Ttarttalo
