= Itisha Giri =

Nepali poet

- Itisha Giri in Palma, 2013
- Born: 1983 (age 42–43); Kathmandu, Nepal
- Occupation: Poet
- Writing career
- Language: English

Itisha Giri (Kathmandu, 1983) is a Nepali poet writing in English and assistant editor of the literature magazine La.Lit.

== Career ==
Giri grew up in Nepal, where she was introduced to poetry and learned English in school. She left Nepal at age 17, with English eventually becoming her preferred language to work in. She pursued further education in the United Kingdom. Nevertheless, she often presents her poems in Nepali and expressed her desire to translate and publish her poem book into the national language of Nepal.

=== Writing ===
Giri began writing poetry with intentions of publication in the early 2010s.

In 2013, she was invited as a guest poet to the Mediterranean Poetry Festival in Mallorca. In September and October 2019, she participated at the VIII International Poetry Translation Workshop "Con barqueira e remador" on San Simón island in Vigo, and in 2021 she was invited to Poemas Di(n)versos festival in A Coruña; both events were organised by Yolanda Castaño.

In December 2019 she participated in the Nepal Literature Festival. In August 2020 Itisha Giri participated at the Festival Mediterranju tal-Letteratura ta' Malta, in La Valletta. A year later, in October 2021, Itisha Giri was among the poets at the VIII Poemagosto festival in Allariz, Galicia, reading some of his poems in Nepali, as well as she did in other occasions. In February 2022 she was invited to the 5º Festival Internacional Febrero Poético (FIFP) Oriente - Occidente, organized by Casa Árabe in Madrid

She is the editor of poetry anthology These Fine Lines: Poems of Restraint and Abandon, published by SAFU.

Her 2022 poetry collection, An Archive, examines the issues and experiences of women in Nepal. Although published in English, she has expressed support for a partial or full translation of the work into Nepali. Her poems has been translated (and published) into Spanish, Galician, Catalan, Maltese, and Esperanto.

Her works has appeared in literary journals such as The Aerogram, La.Lit, Of Nepalese Clay, and in The House of Snow: An Anthology of the Greatest Writing About Nepal, published in Britain by Head of Zeus.

Currently, she works as an assistant editor of poetry for La.Lit; an international literary magazine published in Kathmandu. She also guides poetry workshops.

=== Podcasting ===
Giri is a co-host of the feminist podcast Boju Bajai, which she co-founded in 2016 with Bhrikuti Rai.

== Bibliography ==
=== Poetry ===
- An Archive. Lalitpur: Safu (2022)

=== Collective works ===
- The House of Snow: An Anthology of the Greatest Writing About Nepal. Head of Zeus.

=== Anthology (as an editor) ===
- These Fine Lines: Poems of Restraint and Abandon. Lalitpur: Safu (2016)
