= Aurora Luque =

Spanish poet, writer, academic and translator

- Born: Aurora Luque Ortiz; 20 September 1962 (age 63); Almería, Spain
- Education: University of Granada
- Occupations: Writer, translator
- Awards: Federico García Lorca Award (1981); Generation of '27 Poetry Award (2008); National Poetry Award (2022)

Aurora Luque Ortiz (born 20 September 1962) is a Spanish poet, translator, teacher, and writer based in Andalusia.

== Biography ==
Aurora Luque was born in Almería in 1962. She has a degree in Classical Philology from the University of Granada and has been a professor of Ancient Greek since 1988 in Málaga, where she has developed a large part of her career. She contributed as a columnist to the newspaper Diario Sur from 1999 to 2008.

In 2008, she was awarded the Meridiana Award from the Andalusian Women's Institute for her work in rescuing forgotten writers. In October 2008, she was appointed director of the Generation of '27 Cultural Center of the Provincial Deputation of Málaga, a position she held until June 2011.

In 2012 Luque enjoyed a residency at Villa Marguerite Yourcenar in Flanders, Belgium, within its program aimed at European writers. She has participated in various international poetry events and meetings in the Americas (Buenos Aires, Medellín, Bogotá, Santo Domingo, Monterrey, Morelia and Mexico City, Havana, Puerto Rico, Buffalo, and New York), Europe (Thessaloniki, Athens, Milan, Palermo, Naples, Bari, Vienna, Bremen, Rotterdam, Malmö, Stockholm, and Kristianstadt), Africa (Cairo, Alexandria, Tetouan, Tangier, Casablanca, Tunisia, and Cape Verde), and Asia (Israel and the Philippines).

She has lectured at various American universities, including the University of Massachusetts, Saint Louis University, Le Moyne College, Skidmore College, Dickinson College, College of the Holy Cross, CUNY, and Montclair College.

She founded and directed the poetry collection "Cuadernos de Trinacria", one of whose titles, Verbos para la rosa by Zanasis Jatsópulos, translated by Vicente Fernández, won the National Award for Best Translation in 2005. Beginning in 2000, she and Jesús Aguado co-directed the "maRemoto" collection of poetry of other cultures for the Center of Editions of the City Council of Málaga (CEDMA). In 2005 she founded the Narila publishing house. She has been part of the Advisory Council of the collection "Puerta del Mar", also of CEDMA, as well as the Governing Council of the Book Institute of the City of Málaga. She has been on the Social Council and is part of the Translation, Literature, and Society research group at the University of Málaga.

== Literary career ==
=== Poetry ===
In 1989 Luque's book Problemas de doblaje took second place for the Premio Adonáis de Poesía. In 1999 she received the Andalusian Critics' Award for Transitoria, a book that had been a finalist of the Rafael Alberti Poetry Prize. In May 2005 she opened the Málaga Book Fair. In 2007 she won the 10th edition of the Generation of '27 Poetry Award for her work La siesta de Epicuro, published by Visor. In 2015 she published Personal & político (Fundación José Manuel Lara), a book with 45 poems that delved into the reality of the Spanish social crisis.

It has been said that she belongs to the same generation as the poet Juan Antonio González Iglesias, one that combines classical tradition with the most furious modernity. With regard to Transitoria, the jury of the Andalusian Critics' Award lauded "the perfect symbiosis between classical language, which knows how to incarnate itself in serene verses, and a colloquial, current speech."

Professor Josefa Álvarez dedicated the study Tradición clásica en la poesía de Aurora Luque (Sevilla, Editorial Renacimiento, 2013) to her.

=== Translation and criticism ===
Luque has made translations of French, Latin, and Ancient and Modern Greek poetry, from authors such as Maria Laina, Louise Labé, Renée Vivien, Sappho, Catullus, Meleager, and all of the Greek poets who dealt with themes of eros or the sea. In 2000 she published Los dados de Eros. Antología de poesía erótica griega (Ediciones Hiperión), and in November 2004 the Sappho translation Poemas y testimonios (Editorial Acantilado).

As a lecturer, she has worked to rescue forgotten authors, such as the playwright María Rosa Gálvez and the writer and ambassador Isabel Oyarzábal, on whom she focused her interest in 2010.

== Works ==
=== Poetry ===
- 1981, Hiperiónida, Granada: Universidad de Granada, collection "Zumaya".
- 1989, Problemas de doblaje, Madrid: Rialp.
- 1991, Fecha de caducidad, Málaga: Tediria (notebook)
- 1992, Carpe noctem, Madrid: Visor.
- 1996, Carpe mare Málaga: Miguel Gómez Ed. (anthology)
- 1998, Transitoria, Sevilla: Renacimiento.
- 2000, Las dudas de Eros, Lucena: Ayuntamiento de Lucena, col. "Cuatro Estaciones". (anthology)
- 2002, Portvaria. Antología 1982-2002, Cuenca: El Toro de Barro. (anthology)
- 2003, Camaradas de Ícaro, Madrid: Visor.
- 2004, Carpe verbum, Málaga: Ayuntamiento de Málaga, col. "Monosabio". Edición de Francisco Fortuny. (anthology)
- 2005, Haikus de Narila, Málaga: Publicaciones Antigua Imprenta Sur. (notebook)
- 2007, Carpe amorem, Sevilla: Renacimiento. Edición de Ricardo Virtanen. (anthology)
- 2008, La siesta de Epicuro, Madrid: Visor.
- 2014, Fabricación de las islas. Poesía y metapoesía,
- 2014, Médula. Antología esencial. Madrid: Fondo de Cultura Económica. Edición de Francisco Ruiz Noguera. (anthology)
- 2015, Personal & político, Sevilla: Fundación José Manuel Lara.
- 2016, Los limones absortos. Poemas mediterráneos.

=== Translation ===
- 1995, Meleagro de Gádara, 25 epigramas, Málaga: col. "Llama de Amor Viva".
- 1996, María Lainá, Nueve poemas, Málaga: col. "Capitel" (in collaboration).
- 2000, Los dados de Eros. Antología de poesía erótica griega, Madrid: Hiperión.
- 2004, Safo, Poemas y testimonios, Barcelona: Acantilado.
- 2004, María Lainá, Los estuches de las células, translation of the Modern Greek by M. L. Villalba, Obdulia Castillo, and Aurora Luque, Málaga: Provincial Deputation of Málaga, col. "MaRemoto".
- 2005, Renée Vivien, Nocturnos, Santander: Revista Ultramar, col. "Travesías".
- 2008, Renée Vivien, Poemas, Tarragona: Igitur.
- 2010, Catulo, Taeter morbus. Poemas a Lesbia, Monterrey, Mexico: University of Nuevo León
- 2011, Louise Labé, Elegías y sonetos, Barcelona: Acantilado.
- 2015, Aquel vivir del mar. El mar en la poesía griega . Antología, Barcelona: Acantilado

== Awards ==
- 1981, Federico García Lorca Award from the University of Granada
- 1989, 2nd place for the Premio Adonáis de Poesía
- 1992, King Juan Carlos Prize
- 1998, finalist for the Rafael Alberti Poetry Prize
- 1999, Andalusian Critics' Award
- 2003, Fray Luis de León Translation Award
- 2008, Generation of '27 Poetry Award
- 2008, Meridiana Award
- 2016, Public Literary Prize from Canal Sur Radio
- 2022, National Poetry Award
