= Rita de Barrenechea =

Spanish writer and playwright

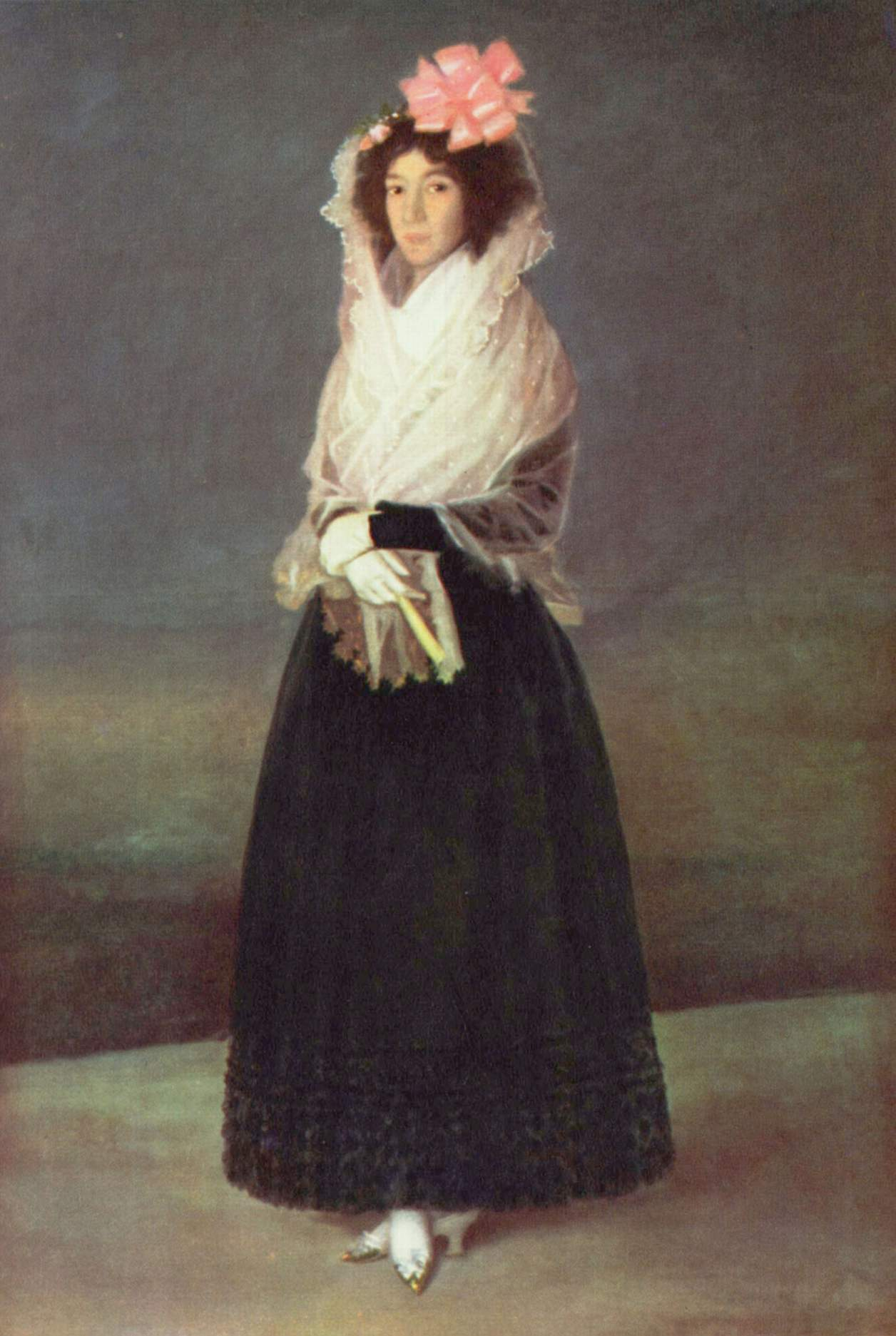
- María Rita de Barrenechea y Morante, in a portrait by Francisco Goya
- Born: María Rita de Barrenechea y Morante de la Madrid; 19 May 1757; Bilbao, Spain
- Died: 23 November 1795 (aged 38)
- Spouse: Juan de Sahagún de la Mata Linares
- Writing career
- Language: Basque, Spanish
- Genre: play

María Rita de Barrenechea y Morante de la Madrid, Countess of Carpio, Marchioness of la Solana (19 May 1757, Bilbao – 23 November 1795, Madrid) was a Spanish writer and playwright of the Age of Enlightenment. She is considered the first Basque playwright and one of the first playwrights in Spanish whose work was edited by a publisher. She was a member of the first group of women of the Board of Ladies of the Matritense Economic Society.

== Life ==
María Rita de Barrenechea y Morante was born in May 1757 in Bilbao. Her parents were José Fernando de Barrenechea y Novia de Salchedo, II Marquis of Puerto and Ana María Morante de la Madrid y Castejón, IV Marquiese of la Solana. In 1761 after her mother's death de Barrenechea moved with her father to Valladolid and entered the monastery of Las Huelgas where she received her literary training.

On 3 January 1775, de Barrenechea married Juan de Sahagún de la Mata Linares, 1st Count of Carpio. In 1780, they moved to Barcelona as her husband was appointed a Mayor of the Royal Court of Barcelona. There de Barrenechea gave birth to two daughters, María Martina, who died as a child, and Francisca Javiera. After several years, her husband was promoted to Minister of the Royal Council of Orders and the family moved to Madrid.

De Barrenechea belonged to the Basque Society (Sociedad Bascongada) and was one of the fourteen women who created the Board of Ladies, associated with the Matritense Economic Society (Sociedad Económica Matritense), to which her husband belonged. She was close friends with the Malaga playwright and poet María Rosa Gálvez, who dedicated a poem to her at her death: La noche. I sing in single verse to the memory of the Countess del Carpio.

De Barrenechea wrote three plays: La Aya, Catalin and one more without a title. La Aya was written in early 1780s. Catalin is a neoclassic sentimental comedy that was published by an anonymous editor in Jaén in 1783.

As a literary figure de Barrenechea was not much appreciated until Catalin was republished in 1998 by Ararteko.

Few months before her death de Barrenchea was a model for Goya’s painting Portrait of the Marquise de la Solana which is currently kept in the Louvre Museum in Paris.

De Barrenchea suffered from many illnesses, including tuberculosis. She died on 23 November 1795 in Madrid.
