= Francisca Aguirre =

Spanish poet and author (1930–2019)

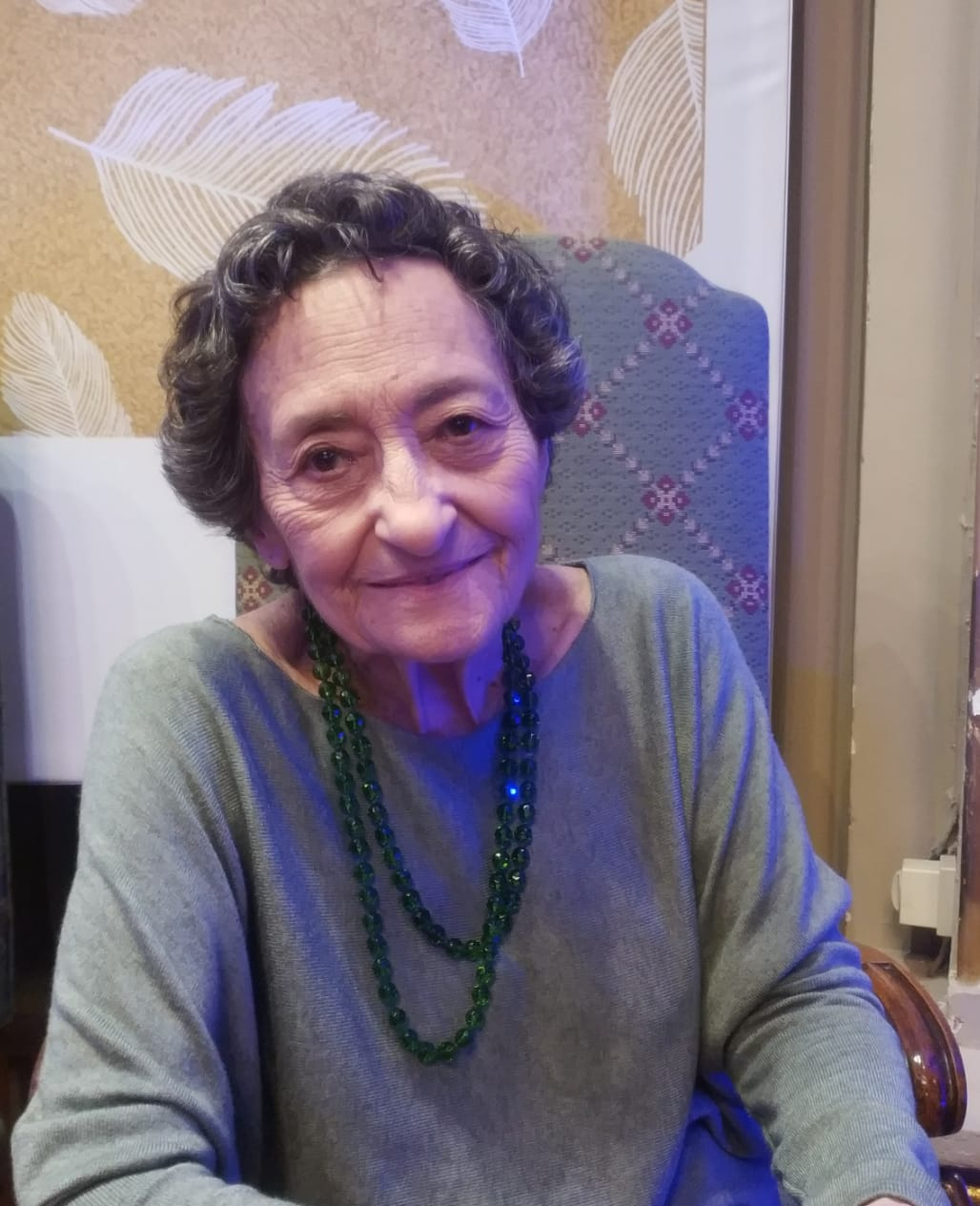
- Aguirre in March 2019
- Born: 27 October 1930; Alicante, Spain
- Died: 13 April 2019 (aged 88); Madrid, Spain
- Occupations: Poet and writer
- Parent: Lorenzo Aguirre

Francisca Aguirre Benito (27 October 1930 – 13 April 2019) was a Spanish poet and author. Her first poetry collection, Ithaca, published in 1972, won her the Leopoldo Panero Poetry Award. In 2011, she won the National Poetry Award for her poetry piece Historia de una anatomía. Aguirre also won the National Prize for Spanish Literature in November 2018.

== Biography ==
Aguirre was born in Alicante, the daughter of noted painter Lorenzo Aguirre. When she was young, Aguirre and her family fled to France due to the Spanish Civil War and were forced to live in political exile. Due to the German invasion of France during World War II, Aguirre's family returned to Spain where her father was killed under Francisco Franco's regime. She was married to fellow poet Félix Grande from 1963 until his death in 2014. In 1965, Aguirre and Grande had a daughter, poet and essayist Guadalupe Grande. She was an aunt of poet Carlos Martínez Aguirre. Her works have been translated into English, French, and Italian.

Aguirre died in Madrid on 13 April 2019, at the age of 88.

== Works ==
- Ithaca (1972); English translation: Ithaca (2004)
- La otra musica (1972): English translation: The Other Music: Selected Poems from the 1970s (2011)
- Espejito, espejito (1995)
- Triste asombro (2001)
- Que planche Rosa Luxemburgo (2002)
- Ensayo general Poesia completa 1966-2000 (2000)
- La herida absurda (2006)
- Nanas para dormir desperdicios (2007)
- Historia de una anatomia (2010)
- Los maestros cantores (2011)
- Detrás de los espejos: Antología 1973-2010 (2013)
- Qué mar somos (2019)
- Prenda de abrigo (2019)
- Pavana del desasosiego
- Los trescientos escalones

== Awards ==
- Leopoldo Panero Award, (Ithaca, 1971)
- City of Irún Award, 1976
- Galiana Award (Que planche Rosa Luxemburgo, 1994)
- Esquío Award, 1995
- Prize Maria Isabel Fernandez Simal, 1998
- Valencian Critic Award for his entire work, 2001
- Alfons el Magnànim Award, 2007
- Poetry Prize "Real Sitio and Villa de Aranjuez", 2009
- Miguel Hernández International Award, 2010
- National Poetry Award, 2011.
- Favorite Daughter of Alicante in 2012.
- National Prize for Spanish Letters, 2018.
