= Antonio Martínez Menchén =

Spanish writer (1930–2022)

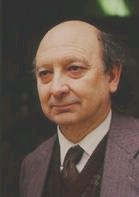

Antonio Martínez Menchén (1930 – 7 January 2022) was a Spanish writer. He is best known for his work in children's literature. He began his career under editor Carlos Barral with the publications of Cinco Variaciones (1963) and Las Tapias (1968). He is most widely known for his children's book La espada y la rosa (1993). He was the father of poet Carlos Martínez Aguirre and brother of writer Andrés Sorel. Menchén was born in Linares, Jaén in 1930, and died on 7 January 2022, at the age of 91.
