= Julia Uceda =

Spanish writer (1925–2024)

- Born: Julia Uceda Valiente; 22 October 1925; Seville, Spain
- Died: 21 July 2024 (aged 98); Ferrol, Spain
- Occupations: Poet, academic
- Writing career
- Language: Spanish

Julia Uceda Valiente (22 October 1925 – 21 July 2024) was a Spanish academic and poet. She won the 2003 National Poetry Award for the book En el viento, hacia el mar and the Gold Medal of Merit in the Fine Arts (2021).

== Biography ==
Uceda graduated in Philosophy and Letters from the University of Seville, where she also obtained a doctorate, with a thesis on poet José Luis Hidalgo.

In 1959, Uceda published her first book Mariposa en cenizas in the magazine Alcaraván de Arcos de la Frontera. Her participation in the Sevillian poetry circles is widely attested. She directed the magazine Rocío together with Manuel Mantero and Ángel Benito.

Uceda also directed a tribute to Juan Ramón Jiménez at the La Rábida Club of Hispanic-American Studies in 1958 and another to Antonio Machado at the University of Seville in 1959. She also participated in the two generational events of young Sevillian poets. On the one hand, she was included in the list of poets of the Anthology of young Sevillian poets made by María de Los Reyes Fuentes in number 159 of the magazine Lírica Hispana of Caracas in 1956 and, on the other, she participated in the recital of the Ateneo de Sevilla on 1 June 1957 that was presented, remembering the Generation of '27, as the presentation act of the Sevillian generation of the fifties. In this event, she participated alongside Aquilino Duque, María de los Reyes Fuentes, Manuel García-Viñó, Pío Gómez Nisa, Manuel Mantero and José María Requena.

In 1961, Uceda won the second prize for the Premio Adonáis de Poesía with the collection of poems Extraña Juventud. close to the social aesthetics prevailing in those years. However, from her third collection of poems, Sin mucha esperanza (1966), she began a new aesthetic direction marked by the incorporation of Greco-Latin thought. These three collections of poems constitute the author's first stage.

After receiving an offer from Michigan State University, Uceda went to the United States. There she wrote Poemas de Cherry Lane (1968), which marked the beginning of a second stage influenced by analytical psychology. It was followed by Campanas en Sansueña, En elogio de la locura and Viejas voces secretas de la noche. In them, the reconciliation of the poetic subject with the Francoist past prevails.

Until 1970, she remained in Michigan, but in that year she returned to Spain, first to Oviedo and then to Albacete. However, she decided to return to the United States although she left again. In 1974, she moved in Ireland where she worked as a teacher at University College Dublin until 1976.

She settled in Galicia in 1976 and there she wrote her last four poetry collections, Del camino de humo, Zona desconocida, Hablando con un haya and Escritos en la cabra de los árbol. Her poems lead readers to reflect on the origin and to search in the present for the heritage of the remote past. Her work has been translated into several languages such as Portuguese, English, Chinese and Hebrew.

Uceda lived in the Ferrol neighborhood of Serantes for five decades. She died there on 21 July 2024, at the age of 98.

== Bibliography ==
- Mariposa en cenizas (1959).
- Extraña juventud (1962).
- Sin mucha esperanza (1966).
- Poemas de Cherry Lane (1968).
- Campanas en Sansueña (1977)
- En elogio de la locura (1980).
- Viejas voces secretas de la noche (1982).
- Poesía (1991).
- Del camino de humo (1994).
- Los muertos y evolución del tema de la muerte en la poesía de José Luis Hidalgo (1990).
- En el viento, hacia el mar (2003), ISBN 84-931995-8-3
- Zona desconocida (2007), ISBN 978-84-96556-91-1
- Hablando con un haya (2010), ISBN 978-84-92913-50-3
- Escrito en la corteza de los árboles (2013), ISBN 978-84-96824-75-1
- Vom inwendigen Blick : zweisprachige Anthologie / Julia Uceda; aus dem Spanischen übersetzt von Angelica Ammar; mit einem Nachwort von Javier Gómez-Montero, Kiel : Ludwig, 2021, ISBN 978-3-86935-420-0
