= Joan Perucho =

Spanish novelist, poet and art critic

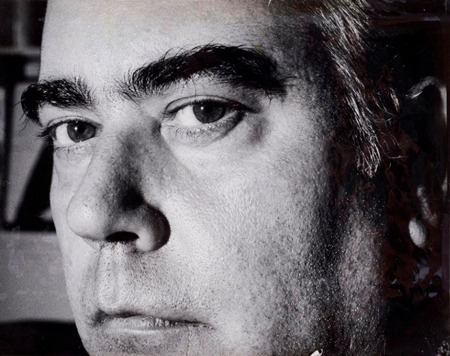
- Joan Perucho
- Born: Joan Perucho Gutiérrez; 7 November 1920; Barcelona
- Died: 28 October 2003 (aged 82); Barcelona
- Other names: Juan Perucho, Joan Perucho
- Occupations: Judge, writer and poet
- Years active: XXth century
- Notable work: Les Històries Naturals

Joan Perucho Gutiérrez (Barcelona, 7 November 1920 – Barcelona, 28 October 2003) was a Catalan novelist, poet and art critic, an activity that alternated with his profession as a judge. His work, written in Catalan and Spanish mix with other traditional elements of avant-garde and science fiction that endow great originality. Natural Stories is his best known work.

He is one of the most prominent figures in fantasy literature on the Iberian Peninsula, where he introduced H.P. Lovecraft. His best-known book, Les històries naturals (1960), is a hilarious vampire story. Published in English as Natural History in 1992 and later translated into a handful of other languages, and was included by Harold Bloom in The Western Canon.

Beyond the literary work, Perucho created a fascinating character: erudite (but fond of mixing inventions with historical information), very ironic, passionate and exuberant. Judge by profession, he exercised his profession in small towns, to be able to work on books and articles. This took him from Barcelona to La Granadella, Banyoles, Móra d’Ebre, Gandesa and Tortosa. He wrote about the landscapes of the south, about Mediterranean Catalonia and about the Spain of the Visigothic period and the Cortes of Cádiz. Perucho's work is an invitation to pleasure, fun and reading.

As for his poetic work, written entirely in Catalan, Perucho approached symbolist poetry, which he mixed with surrealist influences.

== Awards ==
In recognition of his work, Joan Perucho was awarded the Creu de Sant Jordi (1991), the Premi Nacional de Cultura (1995), the Rosalía de Castro Award (1996), the Medal of Artistic Merit of Barcelona City Council (2001), the Premio Nacional de las Letras Españolas (2002) and the National Prize of the Spanish Association of Fantasy and Science Fiction (2002). He was awarded an Honorary Doctorate by the Rovira i Virgili University on 10 November 1995.

== Works ==
Narrative

- 1953: Diana i la mar morta
- 1956: Amb la tècnica de Lovecraft
- 1957: Llibre de cavalleries
- 1960: Les històries naturals
- 1963: Galería de espejos sin fondo
- 1965: Roses, diables i somriures
- 1968: Nicéforas y el grifo
- 1968: Aparicions i fantasmes
- 1969: Botànica oculta o el fals Paracels ISBN 84-233-1053-1
- 1972: Historias secretas de balnearios
- 1974: Històries apòcrifes
- 1975: Els balnearis
- 1976: Monstruari fantàstic
- 1981: Les aventures del cavaller Kosmas
- 1981: Museu d'ombres
- 1981: Petit museu de monstres marins
- 1981: Gàbia per a petits animals feliços. (Quaderns Crema)
- 1982: Discurs de l'Aquitània i altres refinades perversitats. (Quaderns Crema)
- 1983: Incredulitats i devocions
- 1983: Pamela
- 1984: Les delicies de l'oci
- 1984: Los laberintos bizantinos o un viaje con espectros
- 1984: Un viatge amb espectres. (Quaderns Crema)
- 1985: Dietario apócrifo de Octavio de Romeu
- 1986: La guerra de la Cotxinxina
- 1986: Roses, diables i somriures
- 1987: Minuta de mostruos
- 1988: Los misterios de Barcelona
- 1989: Els emperadors d'Abissínia
- 1990: Detrás del espejo
- 1990: El basilisc
- 1990: Algú a la nit respira
- 1990: Els fantasmes de la calaixera
- 1994: El baró de Maldà i les bèsties de l'infern
- 1995: Las sombras del mundo
- 1996: Fabulaciones
- 1997: Obres completes 1985–1997
- 2001: Carmina o la gnosi angélica
- 2001: Història d'un retrat
- 2001: La darrera mirada

Poetry

- 1947: Sota la sang
- 1951: Aurora per vosaltres
- 1953: El mèdium
- 1956: El país de les meravelles
- 1970: Antología poética
- 1978: Poesia 1947–1973
- 1982: Poesía 1947–1981 (bilingüe)
- 1983: Quadern d'Albinyana. (Quaderns Crema)
- 1984: Obra poética completa
- 1985: Itineraris d'Orient
- 1986: Els miralls
- 1987: La medusa
- 1988: El duque de Portland sale a la calle
- 1989: Cendres i diamants
- 1993: Inscripcions, làpides, esteles
- 1994: Els dies de la Sicília i la Germànica
- 1995: Un silencio olvidado: poesía (1943–1947). (Quaderns Crema)
- 1995: Versos d'una tardor
- 1997: El far
- 1998: La mirada d'Antinea
- 2000: Els morts

Essay

- 1968: Miró, les essències de la terra
- 1985: Teoria de Catalunya
- 1986: Una semàntica visual
- 1990: Monstres i erudicions
- 1991: Cultura i imatge
- 1993: La gespa contra el cel, notes de viatge
- 1994: Picasso, el cubisme i Horta de Sant Joan
- 1998: Els secrets de Circe
- 1998: Estética del gusto
- 1998: La meva visió del món, 2 volums
- 1999: Gastronomia i cultura
- 1999: La porta de la identitat
