= Rafael Guillén =

Spanish poet (1933–2023)

- Born: 27 April 1933
- Died: 4 May 2023 (aged 90)
- Occupation: Poet

Rafael Guillén (27 April 1933 – 4 May 2023) was a Spanish poet, a prominent member of the Generation of '50. Awarded Spain's National Poetry Award for Los estados transparentes in 1994, he was one of the most important authors of his generation. He had a long artistic career and among his merits is the fact of helping the recovery of Andalusian poetic culture after the devastation of the Spanish Civil War (1936–1939). The neoclassical influence that weighed on other members of his generation is noticeable in his early works. However, the attraction to popular themes and airs (Cancionero-guía para andar por el aire de Granada, 1962) soon took on an evolution that manifested itself, already in the 1960s, abandoning the rigidity of traditional metrics. With the publication of Moheda (1979), it surprises with its uninhibited and innovative style in syntax. His themes were not light: love and eroticism are often mixed with elegy for the inevitable degradation of the passage of time, expressed in verses permeated with a cadenced musical phrasing.

His prose work is divided between travel narratives, autobiography, essays, lectures and articles.

Guillén died from a stroke on 4 May 2023, at the age of 90.

== Selected bibliography ==
- Antes de la esperanza (1956)
- Río de Dios (Granada, 1957)
- Cancionero-guía para andar por el aire de Granada (Granada, 1962, 1970 and 1993)
- Moheda (Málaga, 1979)
- Poesía completa (1988)
- Los estados transparentes (1993 and 1998)
- La configuración de lo perdido (1995)
- I'm Speaking, selected poems. Northwestern University Press (Evanston, USA, 2001). English translation by Sandy McKinney. ISBN 0-8101-1851-3
- Estado de palabra (2003)
- Signos en el polvo (2005)
- Obras completas (Granada, 2010) ISBN 978-84-937644-2-5
- Balada en tres tiempos (para contrabajo y frases cotidianas). Printed music by Xavier Astor. Diputación de Granada (Granada, 2013). ISBN 978-84-7807-140-1
- El otro lado de la niebla, Editorial Salto de Página (Madrid, 2013). ISBN 978-84-15065-51-7
- El centro del silencio. Selección de poemas (1956–2013). Entorno Gráfico Ediciones (Granada, 2014). ISBN 978-84-941986-5-6
- Balada en tres tiempos (para saxofón y frases coloquiales), Visor Libros (Madrid, 2014). ISBN 978-84-9895-892-8
- The Alhambra. A Suite of Silences and of the Senses. Photographs by Ángel Sánchez. English translation by Lawrence Bohme. Ediciones Miguel Sánchez (Granada, 2016). ISBN 978-84-7169-160-6
- Últimos poemas (Lo que nunca sabré decirte), Fundación José Manuel Lara (Sevilla, 2019). ISBN 978-84-17453-33-6

== Discography ==
- Los alrededores del tiempo (Granada, 2001). Anthology of poems written up to the year 2000.
- Balada en tres tiempos para contrabajo y frases cotidianas (Barcelona, 2021). Nine pieces for poems and double bass by Rafael Guillén & Xavier Astor. Based on the book of the same name by both authors published in 2013. Fundación Omnia, DLB 9248-2021.
