= Andrés Sorel =

Spanish writer (1937–2019)

Andrés Martínez López (1937, in Segovia - 7 January 2019 in Madrid), known by his pseudonym Andrés Sorel, was a Spanish writer, who founded the daily newspaper Liberación. From 1962 to 1971, he served as a correspondent for Radio España Independiente under the Communist Party of Spain. He was the brother of writer Antonio Martínez Menchén, and uncle of poet Carlos Martínez Aguirre. He published more than fifty books during his career.
