= Portrait of the Marquise de la Solana =

Painting by Francisco de Goya

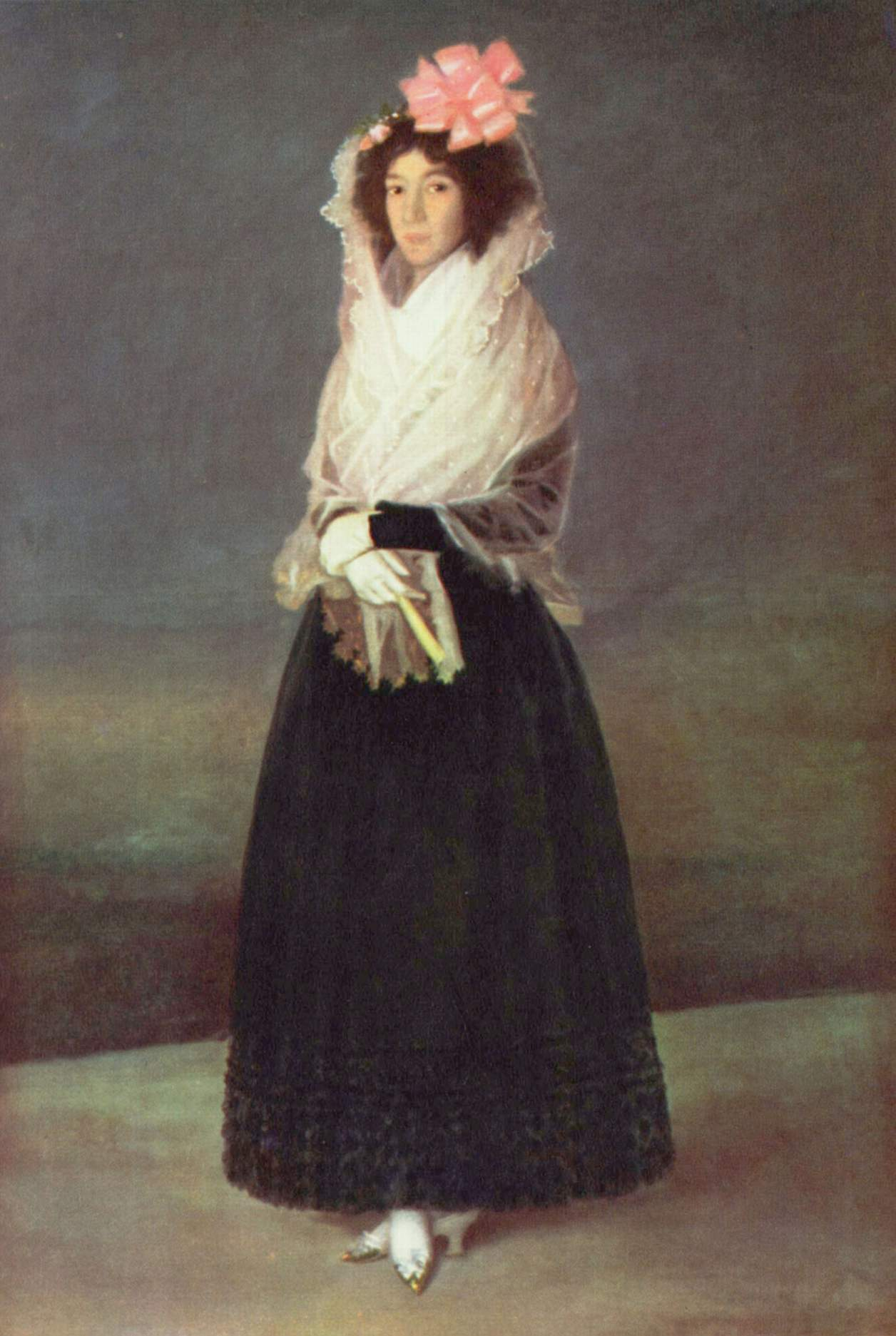
- Artist: Francisco Goya
- Year: 1795
- Medium: Oil on canvas
- Dimensions: 181 cm × 122 cm (71 in × 48 in)
- Location: Louvre; Paris

Portrait of the Marquise de la Solana is an oil on canvas full length portrait by Francisco Goya, from 1795. It depicts his friend the Marquise de la Solana. It now hangs in the Louvre, in Paris, to which it was given in 1953 by Carlos de Beistegui.

== History and description ==
The Marquise de Solana was a writer and playwright of the Spanish Enlightenment. She share many liberal ideas with Goya, who was her personal friend. In the 1790s, Goya was already a fashionable painter, whose portraits were in great demand among the upper classes, both the aristocracy and the upper middle class of Madrid. According to the Louvre website, the painting was made when the marquise, aged 38, believed that she was approaching death, because of her illness. She in fact died the same year, in 1795, shortly after the painting was completed. She doesn't seem to be afraid of death, rather seems to be prepared to face her ultimate demise.

Rita de Barrenechea is shown in a full body portrait, dressed in a shawl and gauze, wearing a black dress, like anticipating her upcoming death. Her pale face denotes the illness she was suffering, but she still has a proud, dignified appearance. Both her hands and her feet appear crossed. She has a fan in her right hand. The portrait presents her elegance and beauty.

The neutral, evanescent background is clearly inspired by the Diego Velázquez tradition, and in the absence of other visual cues, it forces the viewer to stare at the gaze of the marquise, who was close to her death. The painter renders much of her character, seemingly proud and benevolent, as he creates a silent dialogue between the marquise and the viewer.

In this painting, it can be noticed the influence of the great English portraitists, like Thomas Gainsborough and Joshua Reynolds, whose work Goya certainly knew through engravings reproductions.

== See also ==
- List of works by Francisco Goya

== Sources ==
- (in Spanish) Rita Barrenechea.
- (in French) Catalogue entry
