= Lorenzo Casanova =

Spanish painter and teacher (1844-1900)

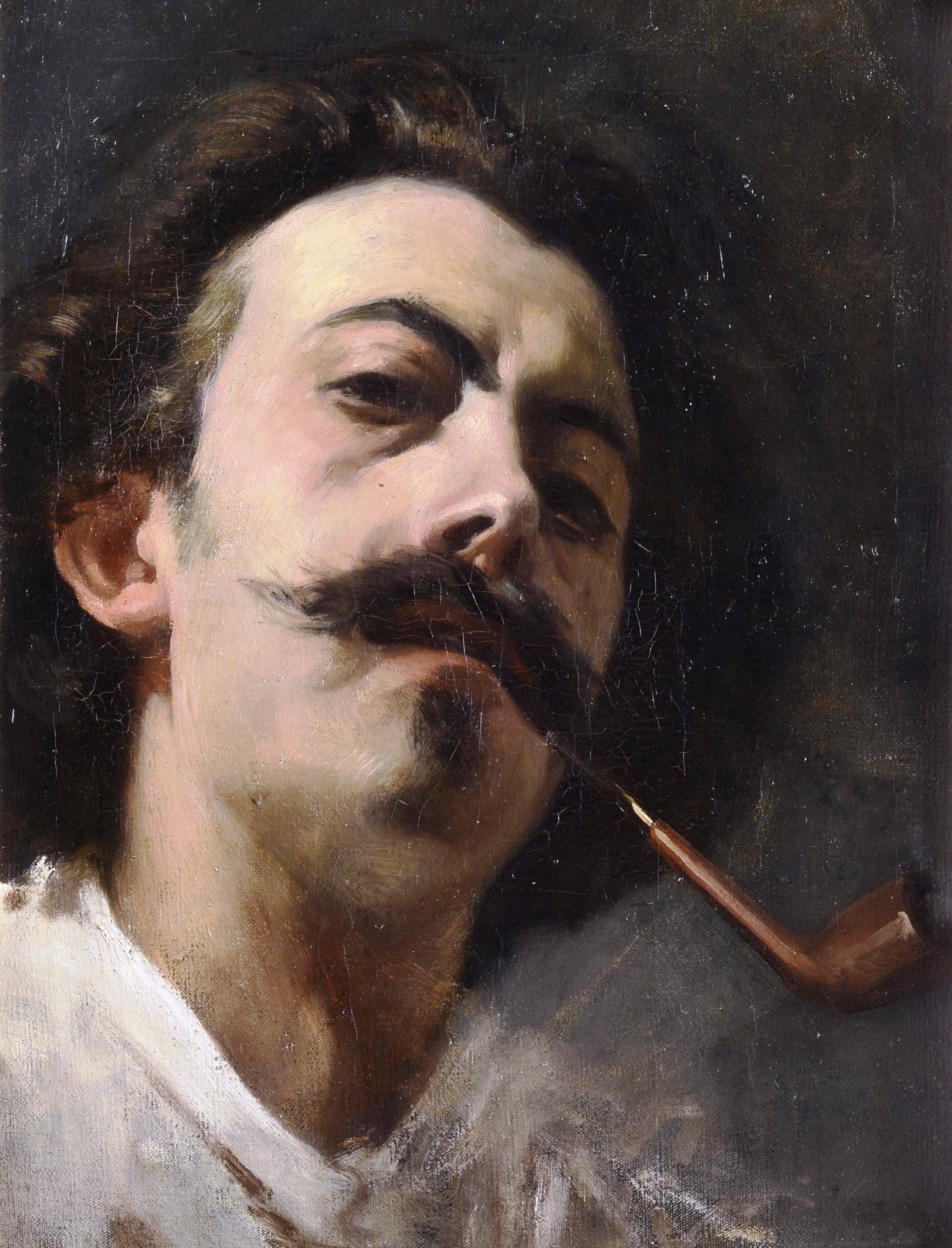
Self-portrait (1866)

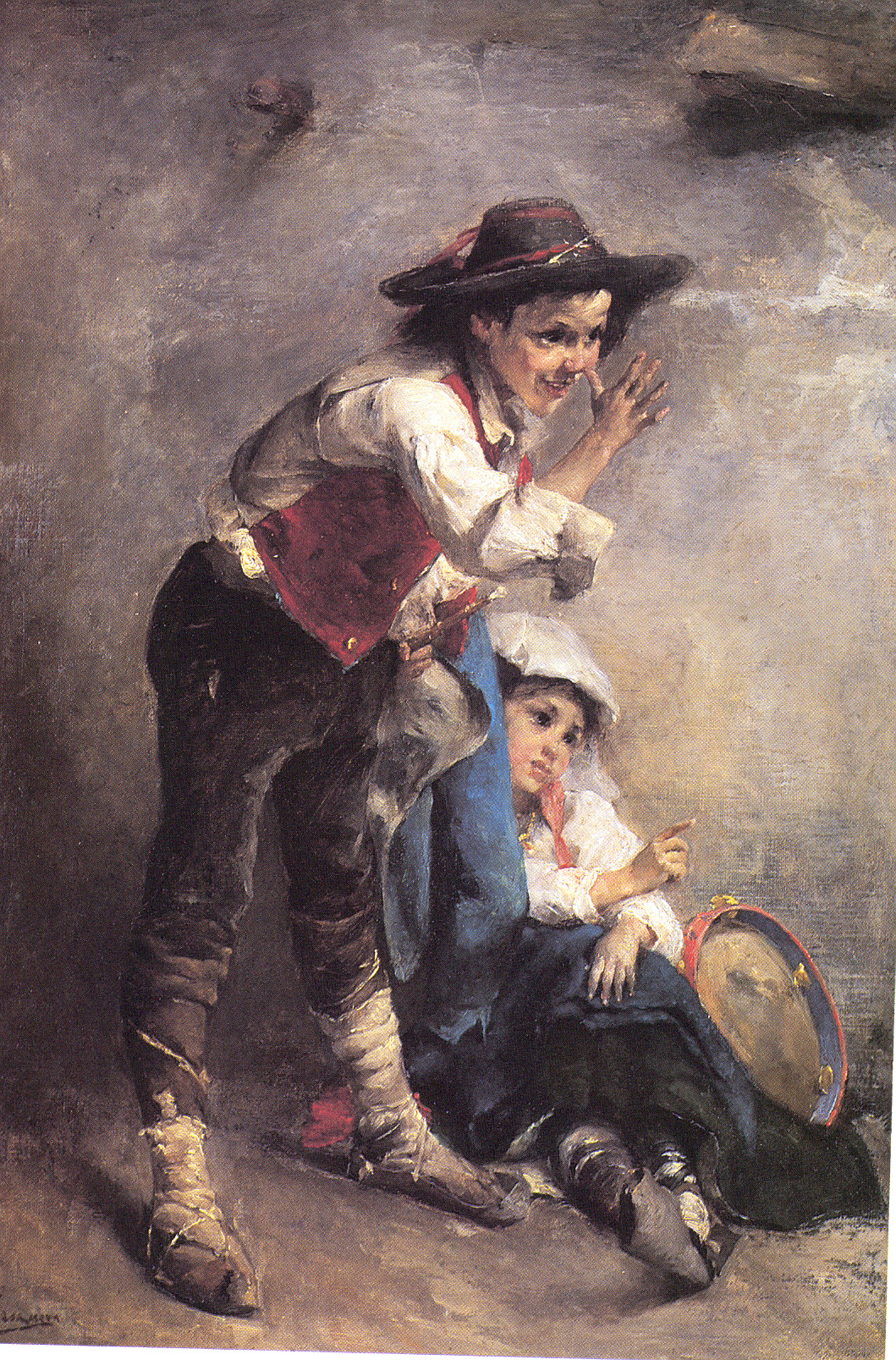
Child's Play

Lorenzo Casanova Ruiz (14 March 1844, in Alcoy – 23 March 1900, in Alicante) was a Spanish costumbrista painter (mostly of historical scenes) and art teacher.

== Biography ==
His father was a butcher. He began his studies at the Real Academia de Bellas Artes de San Carlos de Valencia. His family had few financial resources, but he was able to obtain a grant from the "Diputación Provincial de Alicante" and enrolled at the Real Academia de Bellas Artes de San Fernando in Madrid, where he studied with Federico de Madrazo.

In 1873, he received a further stipend and went to Italy, where he attended the Accademia Chigiana and sent paintings home to show at the National Exhibition of Fine Arts. After his stipend expired, he remained there for two more years, supporting himself by painting.

When his father died in 1879, he returned to Alicante, and became a teacher. Eventually, he opened his own "Academia de Casanova". Many well-known painters were students there, including Lorenzo Aguirre, Andrés Buforn, Fernando Cabrera Cantó, Lorenzo Pericás and Emilio Varela Isabel. He was also Director of the local School of Fine Arts. In 1894, he organized a regional art exposition and sat as the qualifying judge.

He was named a Knight in the Order of Isabella the Catholic and was a member of his alma mater, the Academia San Fernando. He was married to María Teresa Miró Moltó, whose nephew was the poet Gabriel Miró.
