= Lorenzo Pericás =

Spanish painter

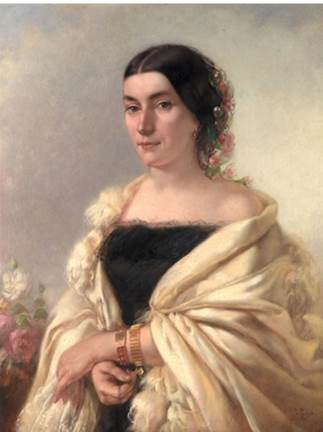
Young Woman with Roses

Lorenzo Pericás Ferrer (1868–1912) was a Spanish painter; known mostly for costumbrista scenes and portraits.

== Biography ==
He was born in Alcoy, to a humble family; his father was a tinsmith. His interest in art was displayed at an early age and his first studies were with Lorenzo Casanova at his private art school, the "Academia de Casanova" in Alicante. Casanova took him under his personal protection in 1885. Five years later, he obtained a grant from the Diputación de Alicante to support his continued studies.

In 1894, he participated in the "Magna Exposición Provincia", organized by the local Sociedad Económica de los Amigos del País, where he competed with painters from throughout Spain. He and other students from Casanova's academy walked away with a significant number of the medals and were given an article in La Ilustración Española y Americana.

Shortly after, he painted "Rehearsing for a Mass" for the sacristy of the Church of Santa María. He also did works for the Provincial Savings Bank and the Choral Society (which are now in private collections) and frescoes for the "Salón Imperio" at the casino as well as tapestries at the palace of the Counts of Gómez-Tortosa in Novelda.

Upon the death of his mentor in 1900, he took over as head of the Casanova Academy.

Always in poor health because of childhood illnesses, he began to suffer from a progressive disorder that affected his mobility. Eventually, his hands became too stiff to paint. Thanks to a fundraising campaign by his friend, Gabriel Miró (Casanova's nephew by marriage), he was able to survive.

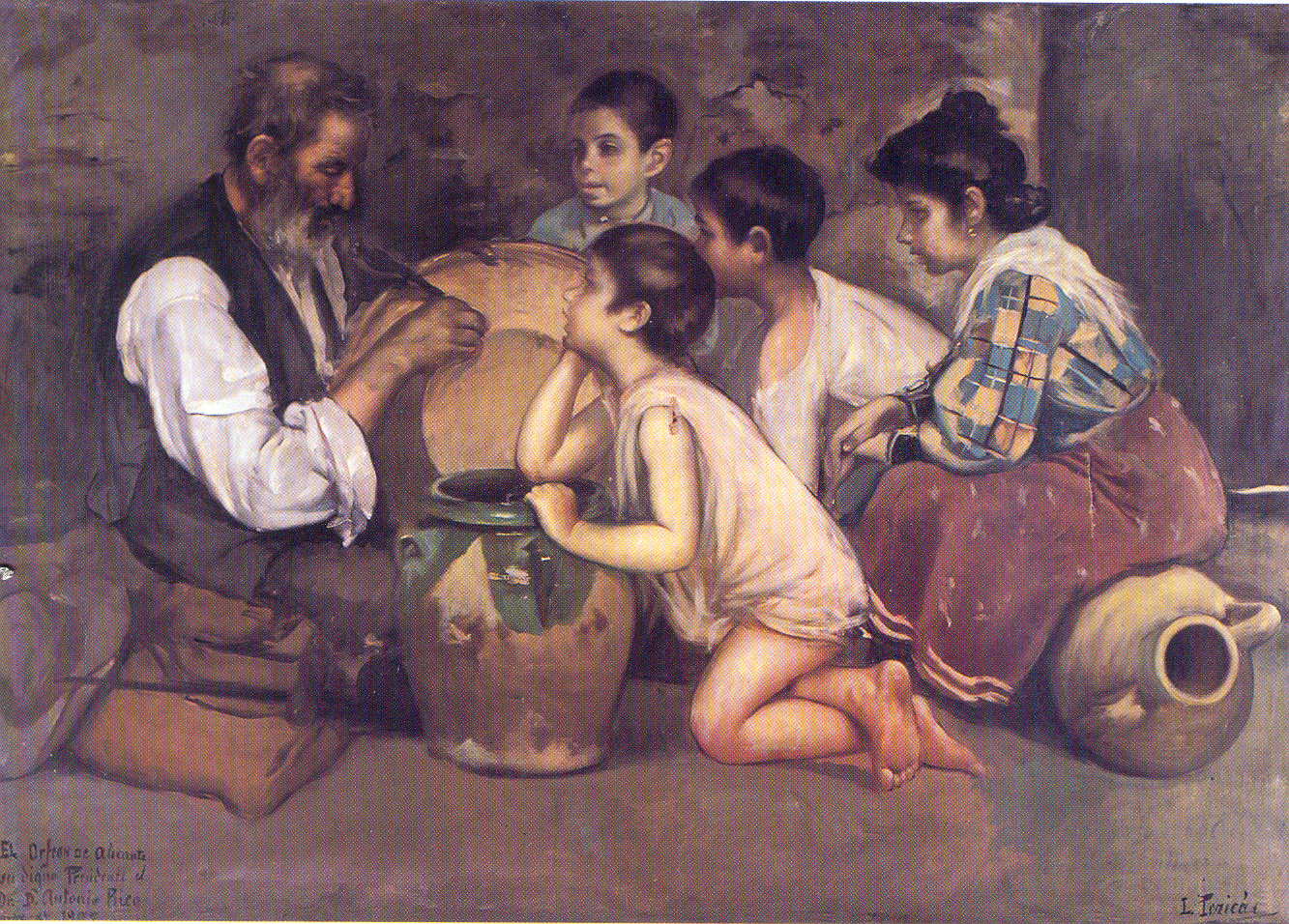
The Pottery Man

He died at the age of forty-four in Alicante, and received a tribute at the National Exhibition of Fine Arts in 1912.
