= Premio Nacional de las Letras Españolas =

Spanish literary award

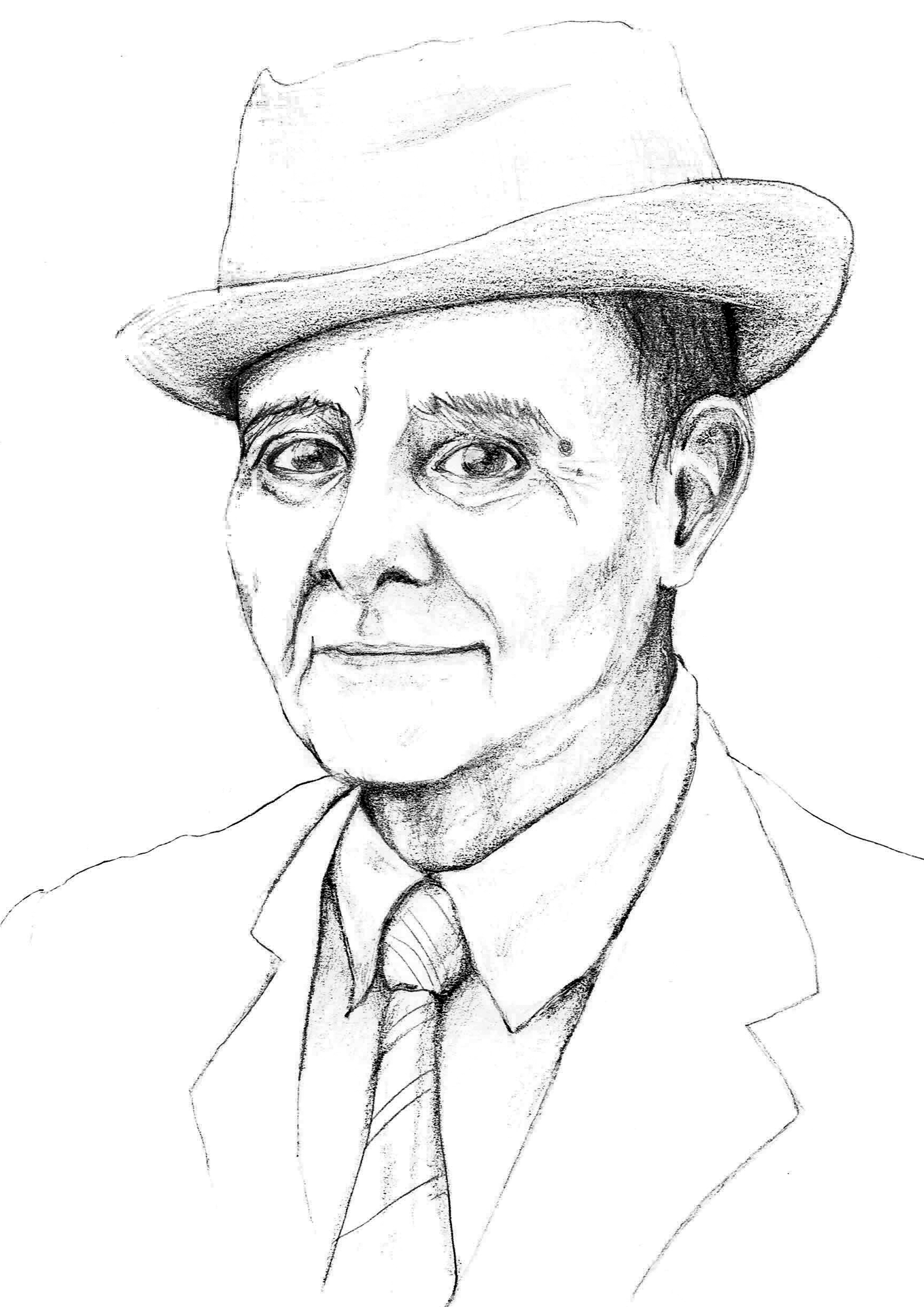
Josep Vicenç Foix was the first recipient of the National Prize for Spanish Literature in 1984.

The Premio Nacional de las Letras Españolas or National Prize for Spanish Literature is one of several National Prizes awarded by the Spanish Ministry of Culture. First awarded in 1984, it recognises an author's literary career. The prize is 40,000 euros.

It should not be confused with the Premios Nacionales de Literatura which are awarded for specific works published the previous year, in different categories.

== Laureates ==
- 1984 – Josep Vicenç Foix (Catalan)
- 1985 – Julio Caro Baroja (Spanish)
- 1986 – Gabriel Celaya (Spanish)
- 1987 – Rosa Chacel (Spanish)
- 1988 – Francisco Ayala (Spanish)
- 1989 – Joan Coromines (Spanish and Catalan)
- 1990 – José Hierro (Spanish)
- 1991 – Miguel Delibes (Spanish)
- 1992 – José Jiménez Lozano (Spanish)
- 1993 – Carlos Bousoño (Spanish)
- 1994 – Carmen Martín Gaite (Spanish)
- 1995 – Manuel Vázquez Montalbán (Spanish)
- 1996 – Antonio Buero Vallejo (Spanish)
- 1997 – Francisco Umbral (Spanish)
- 1998 – Pere Gimferrer (Spanish and Catalan)
- 1999 – Francisco Brines (Spanish)
- 2000 – Martín de Riquer (Spanish and Catalan)
- 2001 – Miquel Batllori (Spanish and Catalan)
- 2002 – Joan Perucho (Catalan)
- 2003 – Leopoldo de Luis (Spanish)
- 2004 – Félix Grande (Spanish)
- 2005 – José Manuel Caballero Bonald (Spanish)
- 2006 – Raúl Guerra Garrido (Spanish)
- 2007 – Ana María Matute (Spanish)
- 2008 – Juan Goytisolo (Spanish)
- 2009 – Rafael Sánchez Ferlosio (Spanish)
- 2010 – Josep Maria Castellet (Spanish and Catalan)
- 2011 – José Luis Sampedro (Spanish)
- 2012 – Francisco Rodríguez Adrados (Spanish)
- 2013 – Luis Goytisolo (Spanish)
- 2014 – Emilio Lledó (Spanish)
- 2015 – Carme Riera (Spanish and Catalan)
- 2016 – Juan Eduardo Zúñiga (Spanish)
- 2017 – Rosa Montero (Spanish)
- 2018 – Francisca Aguirre (Spanish)
- 2019 – Bernardo Atxaga (Basque)
- 2020 – Luis Mateo Díez (Spanish)
- 2021 – José María Merino (Spanish)
- 2022 – Luis Landero (Spanish)
- 2023 – Cristina Fernández Cubas (Spanish)
- 2024 – Manuel Rivas (Galician)
- 2025 – María Victoria Atencia (Spanish)
- 2026 – Enrique Vila-Matas (Spanish)

== See also ==
- National Prize for Literature (Spain)
- Miguel de Cervantes Prize (for a Spanish language author of any nationality).
- Premio de la Crítica Española (given by Asociación Española de Críticos Literarios to best literary works).
