= Antonio Colinas =

Spanish writer & intellectual (born 1946)

- Born: Antonio Colinas Lobato; January 30, 1946 (age 80); La Bañeza, León, Spain
- Occupations: Poet, novelist, essayist, journalist, translator
- Writing career
- Notable works: Sepulcro en Tarquinia, Libro de la mansedumbre, El río de sombra
- Notable awards: National Prize for Literature (1982)
- Website: www.antoniocolinas.com

Antonio Colinas Lobato is a Spanish writer (poet, novelist, journalist, translator, essayist) and intellectual who was born in La Bañeza, León, Spain on January 30, 1946. He has published a variety of works, but is considered to be above all a poet. He won Spain's National Prize for Literature in 1982, among several other honors and awards.

== Awards and honors ==
- 1976 - Premio de la Crítica de poesía castellana for Sepulcro en Tarquinia
- 1982 - Premio Nacional de Literatura (National Prize for Literature (Spain)) for the anthology Poesía, 1967-1980
- 1996 - Mención Especial del Premio Internacional Jovellanos de Ensayo for Sobre la Vida Nueva
- 1998 - Premio Castilla y León de las Letras
- 1999 - Premio Internacional Carlo Betocchi for his work as a translator and scholar of Italian literature
- 2001 - Premio de la Academia Castellana y Leonesa de Poesía
- 2005 - Premio Nacional de Traducción, given by the Ministerio de Asuntos Exteriores de Italia, for his translation of the complete poetry of Nobel-Prize winner Quasimodo
- 2006 - "Alubia de Oro", award giving him the title of "Personaje Bañezano del Año 2006", created by the weekly publication El Adelanto Bañezano
- 2006 - Premio Leonés del Año 2006 (given by Cadena Ser)
- 2008 - Pregonero Vitalicio de la Feria del Libro de Salamanca
- 2011 - Hijo Adoptivo de Salamanca
- 2012 - X Premio de la Crítica de Castilla y León
- 2014 - XV Premio de las Letras Teresa de Ávila
- 2016 - XXV Premio Reina Sofía de Poesía Iberoamericana
- 2019 - IX Premio Dante Alighieri
- 2019 - Premio LericiPea “alla Carriera” 2019 ad Antonio Colinas
- 2023 - Honorary Doctorate from the University of Salamanca

== Individual books of poetry ==
- Junto al lago. Salamanca: Cuadernos para Lisa, 2001. (Written in 1967)
- Poemas de la tierra y de la sangre. León: Diputación Provincial, 1969.
- Preludios a una noche total. Madrid: Rialp, col. Adonais, 1969.
- Truenos y flautas en un templo. San Sebastián: C.A.G. de Guipúzcoa, 1972.
- Sepulcro en Tarquinia. León: Diputación Provincial, col. Provincia, 1975. *2nd edition: Sepulcro en Tarquinia. Barcelona, Lumen, Col. El Bardo, 1976. *3rd edition: Sepulcro en Tarquinia (poema w/ 6 drawings by Montserrat Ramoneda). Barcelona: Galería Amagatotis, 1982. *4th edition: Sepulcro en Tarquinia, poem w/ prologue by Juan Manuel Rozas. Segovia: Pavesas, 1994. *5th edition: Sepulcro en Tarquinia (poem with illustrations by Ramón Pérez Carrió). Pedreguer (Alicante): Collection “Font de La Cometa”, 1999. *6th edition: Sepulcro en Tarquinia (commemoration of the first edition (1975-2005) w/ CD of the poet's voice). Madrid: Visor Libros, 2005. *7th edition: Sepulcro en Tarquinia (poem, illuminated by the artist Javier Alcaíns). Mérida: Editora Regional de Extremadura, 2009.
- Astrolabio. Madrid: Visor Libros, 1979.
- En lo oscuro. Rota (Cádiz): Cuadernos de Cera, 1981.
- Noche más allá de la noche. Madrid: Visor Libros, 1983. *2nd edition: Noche más allá de la noche. Valladolid: Fundación Jorge Guillén, 2004.
- La viña salvaje. Córdoba: Antorcha de Paja, 1985.
- Diapasón infinito (w/ illustrations by Perejaume). Barcelona: Tallers Chardon y Yamamoto, 1986.
- Dieciocho poemas. Ibiza: Caixa Balears, 1987.
- Material de lectura. México: Universidad Nacional Autónoma de México, 1987.
- Jardín de Orfeo. Madrid: Visor Libros, 1988.
- Libro de las noches abiertas (w/ 16 illustrations by Mario Arlati). Milan: Peter Pfeiffer, 1989.
- Blanco / Negro (con 5 ilustraciones de Mario Arlati, ed. bilingüe). Milan: Peter Pfeiffer, 1990.
- Los silencios de fuego. Barcelona: Tusquets, col. Marginales, 1992.
- La hora interior. Barcelona: Taller Joan Roma, 1992.
- Pájaros en el muro / Birds in the wall (bilingual, w/ 3 illustrations by Barry Flanagan). Barcelona: Taller Joan Roma, 1995.
- Libro de la mansedumbre. Barcelona, Tusquets, col. Nuevos Textos Sagrados, 1997.
- Córdoba adolescente. Córdoba: CajaSur, col. Los Cuadernos de Sandua, 1997.
- Amor que enciende más amor. Barcelona: Plaza y Janés, 1999.
- Nueve poemas. Salamanca: Celya, col. Aedo de Poesía, 2000.
- Tiempo y abismo. Barcelona: Tusquets, col. Nuevos Textos Sagrados, 2002.
- L'amour, el amor (w/ poems by Michel Bohbot; illustrations by Irriguible). Paris: Editions du Labyrinthe, 2002.
- Obscur hautbois de brume (bilingual anthology by Françoise, et al. Contains Noche más allá de la noche). Bruxelles: Le Cri, 2003.
- Seis poemas (commentary by Luis Miguel Alonso). Burgos: Instituto de la Lengua de Castilla y León, 2003.
- Treinta y ocho poemas (tribute to Antonio Manso). Madrid: Real Casa de la Moneda, 2003.
- En Ávila unas pocas palabras. Valladolid: El Gato Gris, 2004.
- Respirar adentro (w/ photos by Gianfranco Negri-Clementi). Milan: Scheiwiller, 2006.
- Trilogía de la mansedumbre (edition not sold). Valladolid: Junta de Castilla y León, 2006.
- Donde la luz llora luz. Valladolid: El Gato Gris, 2007.
- Riberas del Órbigo (w/ photos by Manuel Raigada). La Bañeza (León): Ayuntamiento de La Bañeza, 2007.
- Desiertos de la luz. Barcelona: Tusquets, 2008.
- Catorce retratos de mujer. Salamanca: El Zurguén, 2011. *2nd edition: Catorce retratos de mujer. Cuenca: Segundo Santos Ediciones, 2011. *3rd edition: Catorce retratos de mujer (w/ 14 illustrations by Cis Lenaerts). Ibiza: Edicions H. Jenniger, 2011.
- Canciones para una música silente. Madrid: Siruela, 2014.
- En los prados sembrados de ojos. Madrid: Siruela, 2020.

== Poetic anthologies ==
- Poesía, 1967-1980. Madrid: Visor Libros, 1982.
- Poesía, 1967-1981. Madrid: Visor Libros, 1984.
- El río de sombra: Poesía 1967-1990. Madrid: Visor Libros, 1994.
- El río de sombra: Treinta años de poesía, 1967-1997. Madrid: Visor Libros, 1999.
- La hora interior: Antología poética 1967-2001. Salamanca[?]: Junta de Castilla y León, 2002.
- El río de sombra: Treinta y cinco años de poesía, 1967-2002. Madrid: Visor Libros, 2004.
- En la luz respirada (critical edition of Sepulcro en Tarquinia, Noche más allá de la noche, and Libro de la mansedumbre). Edited by José E. Martínez). Madrid: Cátedra, 2004.
- La luz es nuestra sangre. León: Edilesa, 2006.
- Antología. Tenerife: Caja Canarias, 2007.
- Nueva ofrenda. Cáceres: Colección Abezetario, 2009.
- Obra poética completa. Madrid: Ediciones Siruela, 2011.
- Obra poética completa. México DF: Fondo de Cultura Económica/Conaculta, 2011.

== Narrative, essay, and other prose ==
- Viaje a los monasterios de España. Barcelona: Planeta (“Biblioteca Cultural RTV” Collection), 1976. (New edition: León: Edilesa, 2003)
- Un año en el sur: para una educación estética. Madrid: Trieste, 1985.
- Larga carta a Francesca. Barcelona: Seix Barral, 1986.
- Días en Petavonium. Barcelona: Tusquets Editores, 1994.
- El crujido de la luz. León: Edilesa, 1999.
- Huellas. Valladolid: Castilla Ediciones, 2003.
- Cerca de la Montaña Kumgang. Salamanca: Amarú Edciones, 2007.
- Leyendo en las piedras. Madrid: Siruela, 2007.
- El sentido primero de la palabra poética. Madrid: Siruela, 2008.
- "El hombre que odiaba los árboles." In Narraciones de la Escuela. Ed. Isabel Cantón. Barcelona: Editorial Davinci, 2009.

== Critical bibliography on Antonio Colinas’s works: books, articles, press ==
- Agustín Fernández, Susana. Inventario de Antonio Colinas. Burgos: Fundación Instituto Castellano y Leonés de la Lengua, 2007.
- Alonso Gutiérrez, Luis Miguel. El corazón desmemoriado: Claves poéticas de Antonio Colinas. Salamanca: Diputación Provincial de León, 1990.
- Alonso Gutiérrez, Luis Miguel. Antonio Colinas: un clásico del siglo XXI. León: Universidad de León, 2000.
- Amusco, Alejandro. "Inteligencia es belleza." Rev. of Sepulcro en Tarquinia by Antonio Colinas. El Ciervo 25, No. 276 (Jan. 1976): 29-30.
- Calleja Medel, Gilda Virginia. Antonio Colinas, traductor. León: Universidad de León, 2001.
- Carnicero, Luis. Sobre el contemplar: Antonio Colinas: "Poesía vivida y vida ensoñada". León: Letras de Venatia, 2007.
- Fellie, Maria C. Antonio Colinas: Poetry and Life (1967-1988), A Critical Introduction to the Foundational Poetic Works. Dissertation. University of North Carolina at Chapel Hill, 2016.
- Fellie, Maria C. Antonio Colinas: The Re-Writing of ‘Sepulcro en Tarquinia’ in Larga carta a Francesca. Thesis. University of North Carolina at Chapel Hill, 2009.
- Fellie, Maria C. “‘Deep Well of Stars’: The Translation of Images in the Poetry of Antonio Colinas.” Translation Review 116, no. 1 (2023): 16–27. https://doi.org/10.1080/07374836.2023.2226699.
- Fellie, Maria C. "'Venus sobre las aguas’: Simonetta Vespucci, Cover Art, and Antonio Colinas's Obra poética completa (2011)." Romance Notes 60, no. 3 (2020): 513-525. https://doi.org/10.1353/rmc.2020.0049.
- de la Fuente, Manuel. "Antonio Colinas, poesía como un bálsamo para tiempos de crisis." ABC 24 February 2011.
- Llamazares, Julio. "La poesía de Antonio Colinas." El viaje hacia el centro. Madrid: Calambur, 1997. 103-109.
- López Castro, Armando. El hilo del aire: Estudios sobre Antonio Colinas. Universidad de León, 2017.
- Lucas, Antonio. "A pesar de todo, mi visión del mundo siempre es esperanzada." Interview of Antonio Colinas. El mundo 4 June 2014.
- Martín-Estudillo, Luis. "Europa en el imaginario poético de la España contemporánea (1966-2006): del utopismo ansioso al desencanto crítico.” Bulletin of Hispanic Studies 87.7 (2010): 801-819.
- Martínez Cantón, Clara Isabel. Métrica y poética de Antonio Colinas. Seville: Padilla Libros, 2011.
- Martínez Fernández, José Enrique. "Introducción" to En la luz respirada by Antonio Colinas. Madrid: Cátedra, 2004. 13-131.
- Matas Caballero, Juan, & Antonio-Odón Alonso Ramos (editors). Antonio Colinas: Nuevos géneros, nuevos caminos. Fundación Conrado Blanco, Casa de la Poesia - Fondo Cultural Antonio Colinas, 2022.
- Matas Caballero, Juan, & Antonio-Odón Alonso Ramos (editors). La obra poética de Antonio Colinas: Origen y universalidad. Fundación Conrado Blanco, Casa de la Poesia - Fondo Cultural Antonio Colinas, 2021.
- Moliner, Luis. Respirar: La palabra poética de Antonio Colinas. Madrid: Devenir, 2007.
- Nana Tadoun, Guy Merlin. Antonio Colinas o la escritura como aventura circular: Poesía y transtextualidad desde su trilogía final (1992-2002). Dissertation. U de Salamanca, 2008.
- Olivio Jiménez, José. "Prólogo: La poesía de Antonio Colinas." Antonio Colinas: Poesía, 1967-1980. Madrid: Visor, 1982. 7-33.
- Pritchett, Kay. "Antonio Colinas’s Larga carta a Francesca: A Lacanian Approach to Its Formal Construction." Hispania 74.2 (1991): 262-268.
- Pritchett, Kay, ed. "Antonio Colinas." Four Post-Modern Poets of Spain: A Critical Introduction with Translations of the Poems. Fayetteville, AR: U of Arkansas P, 1991. 187-223.
- Puerto, José Luis. "Antonio Colinas: La poesía como itinerario de purificación." El viaje hacia el centro. Madrid: Calambur, 1997. 41-70.
- Riaño, Peio H. "Tiritas para el paraíso." Público (online newspaper) February 20, 2011. Madrid.
- Rodríguez Marcos, Javier. "Antonio Colinas: 'Hemos cometido el error de reducir la poesía a lo intelectual'." El País 12 May 2014.
- Rozas, Juan Manuel. "Mi visión del poema 'Sepulcro en Tarquinia'." Ínsula 508 (April 1989): 1-2.
- Santiago Bolaños, María Fernanda. "Antonio Colinas: Fuego que emerge de las ruinas del templo." El viaje hacia el centro. Madrid: Calambur, 1997. 117-128.
