= Carlos Martínez Aguirre =

Spanish poet

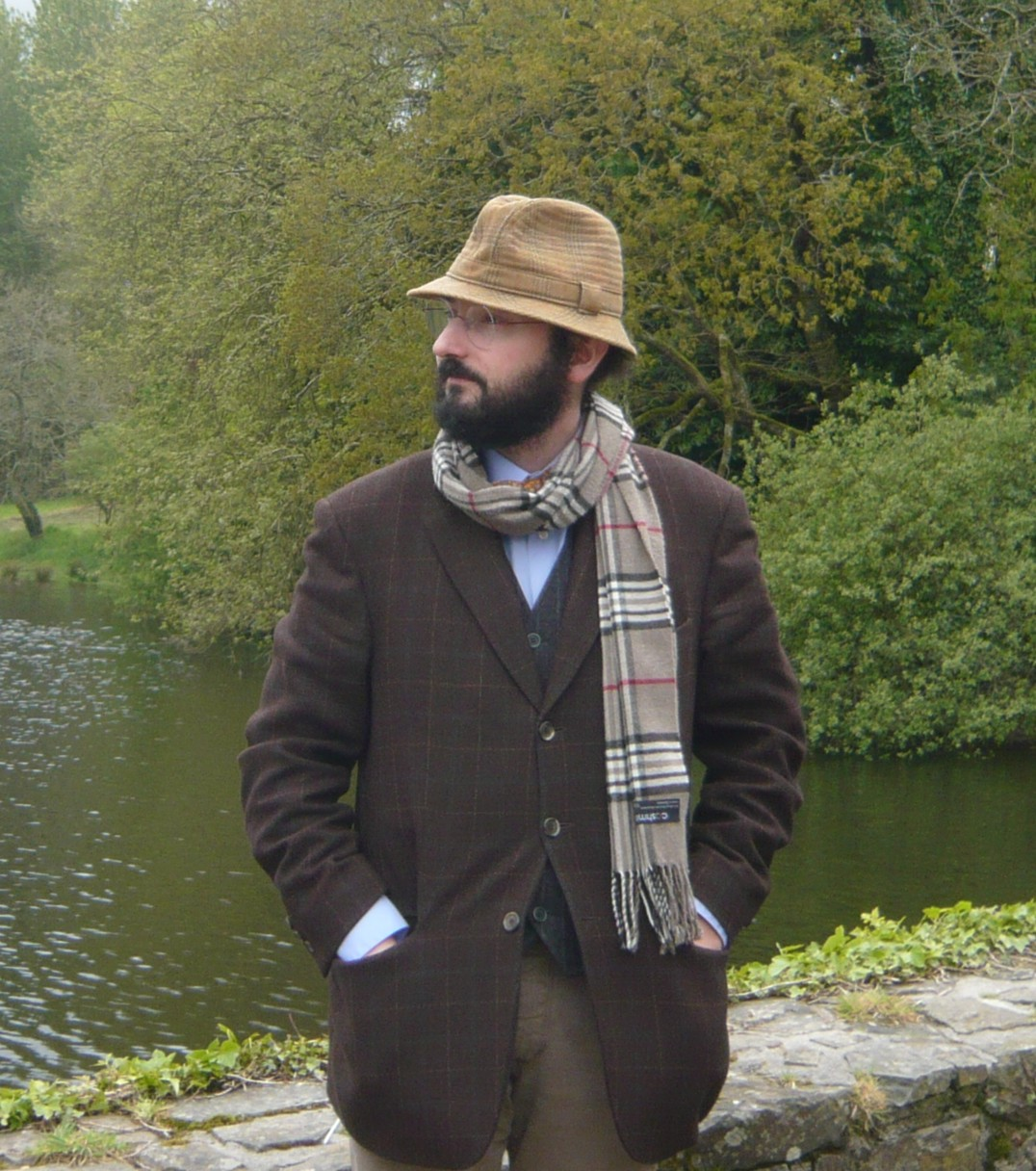
- Born: 1974 (age 51–52); Madrid, Spain
- Occupations: Poet and classical scholar
- Notable work: La camarera del cine Doré y otros poemas. A Strange Odyssey. Confessions of a Classicist.
- Parent: Antonio Martínez Menchén

Carlos Martínez Aguirre (born 1974, in Madrid) is a Spanish poet and classical scholar. He holds a degree in Classical Philology. He has been a Spanish teacher in the Cervantes Institute of Athens and a research student at the Institute of Byzantine Studies in the same city. He was nominated for the Hyperion Prize for Poetry in 1997.

He is best known for his poems La camarera del cine Doré y otros poemas (1997) and his autobiographical essay about the didactics of Classical Languages A Strange Odyssey. Confessions of a Classicist (2013).

In the field of education, he has excelled in advocating for the didactic revitalization of classical language instruction, particularly through the implementation of natural and active teaching methodologies, most notably the approach pioneered by Professor Hans Henning Ørberg.

He is the son of writer Antonio Martínez Menchén, grandson of painter Lorenzo Aguirre, nephew of poet Francisca Aguirre and writer Andrés Sorel, and a cousin of poet Guadalupe Grande.
