= Raúl Guerra Garrido =

Spanish writer (1935–2022)

- Born: 4 April 1935; Madrid, Spain
- Died: 2 December 2022 (aged 87); San Sebastián, Spain
- Occupations: Writer; Pharmacist

Raúl Guerra Garrido (4 April 1935 – 2 December 2022) was a Spanish writer. He was the recipient of the 1975 Premio Nadal for Lectura insólita de El Capital and the 1984 Premio Planeta de Novela for La guerra del Wolfram.

Guerra Garrido died in San Sebastián on 2 December 2022, at the age of 87.

== Bibliography ==
=== Novels ===
- Ni héroe ni nada (1969)
- Cacereño (1970)
- El pornógrafo (1971)
- ¡Ay! (1972)
- La fuga de un cerebro (1973)
- Hipótesis (1975)
- Lectura insólita de 'El Capital' (1976)
- Copenhague no existe (1979)
- La costumbre de morir (1981)
- Escrito en un dólar (1983)
- El año del wólfram (1984)
- La mar es mala mujer (1987)
- La carta (1990)
- El síndrome de Scott (1993)
- Tantos inocentes (1996)
- Castilla en canal (1999)
- El otoño siempre hiere (2000)
- La Gran Vía es Nueva York (2004)
- La soledad del ángel de la guarda (2007)
- Quien sueña novela (2010)
- La estrategia del outsider o la vuelta al mundo de Naraya Sola (2012)
- Demolición (2018)

=== Short stories ===
- La sueca desnuda (1984)
- Maitasun objetu eztizkoa (1988)
- Viaje a una provincia de interior (1990)
- Micrófono oculto (1991)

=== Essays ===
- Medicamentos españoles (1972)
- El telemirón (1982)
- Mis más bellas derrotas (1994)
- Esto no es un ensayo sobre Miró (1994)
- Tertulia de rebotica (2016)
- Un morroi chino con un higo en la coleta (2018)

== Awards ==
- Premio de novela Ciudad de Oviedo (1972)
- Premio Nadal (1975)
- Premio Planeta de Novela (1984)
- Premio Rodolfo Walsh (1997)
- Order of Constitutional Merit (2003)
- Premio Nacional de las Letras Españolas (2006)
- Medalla Carracido (2011)
- Grand Cross of the Civil Order of Alfonso X the Wise (2019)
