= Carlos Bousoño =

Spanish poet and literary critic

The Most Excellent Carlos Bousoño
- Born: Carlos Bousoño Prieto; 9 May 1923; Boal, Spain
- Died: 24 October 2015 (aged 92); Madrid, Spain

Seat M of the Real Academia Española
- In office 19 October 1980 (Note: Elected on 5 April 1979) – 24 October 2015
- Preceded by: Salvador de Madariaga
- Succeeded by: Juan Mayorga

Carlos Bousoño Prieto (9 May 1923 – 24 October 2015) was a Spanish poet and literary critic. His work is frequently associated with the post-Spanish Civil War literary group.

Bousoño was a recipient of both the National Prize for Spanish Literature and the Prince of Asturias Award for Literature.

== Biography ==
Bousoño was born in Boal, Asturias in 1923.

When he was two years old, his family moved to Oviedo, where he completed the first two years of a Philosophy and Arts degree. He moved to Madrid when he was 19, graduating from the Central University (now known as Complutense) with the Extraordinary Prize in 1946; he completed his master's degree there in 1949, being the first to write a master's thesis about a living writer, Vicente Aleixandre. By 1950, his work La poesía de Vicente Aleixandre (The poetry of Vicente Aleixandre) became widely recognised, and today it remains one of the best and deepest works about Vicente Aleixandre's poetry.

From 1946-48, Bousoño traveled in Mexico and the United States, teaching literature at Wellesley College in Massachusetts before returning to Spain.

On 24 October 2015, Bousoño died at the age of 92.

== Poetry ==
Bousoño published his first book of poetry, Subida al amor, in 1945.

== Academic career ==
His passion for poetry, along with his intelligence and curiosity, helped him make early inroads within the world of literary theory. In 1952, he published Teoría de la expresión poética (Theory of poetic expression), in which he analyzes the secrets of the poetic mystery. He became a renowned interpreter of Spanish literature and an influential literary critic.

Bousoño taught Spanish literature at several American universities, including Wellesley, Smith, Vanderbilt, Middlebury, and New York University. He then became lecturer of Stylistics at the Complutense University of Madrid, where he remains a professor emeritus. Among his students of poetry who credit his teachings as influential to their careers is the Puerto Rican poet Giannina Braschi, author of "Yo-Yo Boing!" and "United States of Banana".

In his book Épocas literarias y evolución (Literary times and evolution), Bousoño analyzes the history of literary ages and their corresponding movements and evolution. He has also studied the evolution of metaphoric expression, from classical examples like "your hand is like the snow", to more complex surrealistic metaphors, for example: "swords like lips" (in reference to one Aleixandre's most famous books, Espadas como labios (Swords like lips).

In 1979, Bousoño became a member of the Royal Spanish Academy. He remained occupant of the Academy chair 'M' until his death in 2015.

== Recognition ==
René Wellek said that Bousoño was his preferred theorist in all of Europe.

Spanish author and critic Luis Antonio de Villena called Bousoño "one of the most outstanding poets of the postwar generations" and "an outstanding poetry theorist, upholding the most profound sense of irrationalism and surrealism, that is, that the magic of the irrational can be understood".

German-born poet Scharlie Meeuws wrote an 'Elegy on the Death of Carlos Bousoño'.

== Awards ==
- 1968 – Critics Prize for Spanish Poetry (for Oda en la ceniza)
- 1974 – Critics Prize for Spanish Poetry (for Las monedas sobre la losa)
- 1978 – National Prize for Essays (for El irracionalismo poético (El símbolo))
- 1990 – National Prize for Poetry (for Metáfora del desafuero)
- 1993 – National Prize for Spanish Literature
- 1995 – Prince of Asturias Award for Literature
