= Lorenzo Aguirre =

Spanish painter

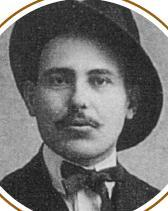
- Lorenzo Aguirre (before 1910?)
- Born: 14 November 1884; Pamplona, Spain
- Died: 6 October 1942 (aged 57); Madrid, Spain
- Cause of death: Execution by garrote
- Occupation: Painter

Lorenzo Victoriano Aguirre Sánchez (14 November 1884 – 6 October 1942) was a Spanish painter. He also worked as a caricaturist, poster artist and set designer.

== Biography ==
He was born in Pamplona, Spain, but his parents moved to Alicante when he was four years old. There he had his first art lessons at the age of eleven with Lorenzo Casanova. In 1899 he went to Madrid, where he attended the Real Academia de Bellas Artes de San Fernando; in 1904 he became a drawing teacher at the "Escuela Especial de Pintura, Escultura y Grabado", a satellite school of the academy. Six year later, he went to Paris, where he worked in the set designing studio at the Paris Opera. He also took private lessons from the Swiss artist Alice Bailly.

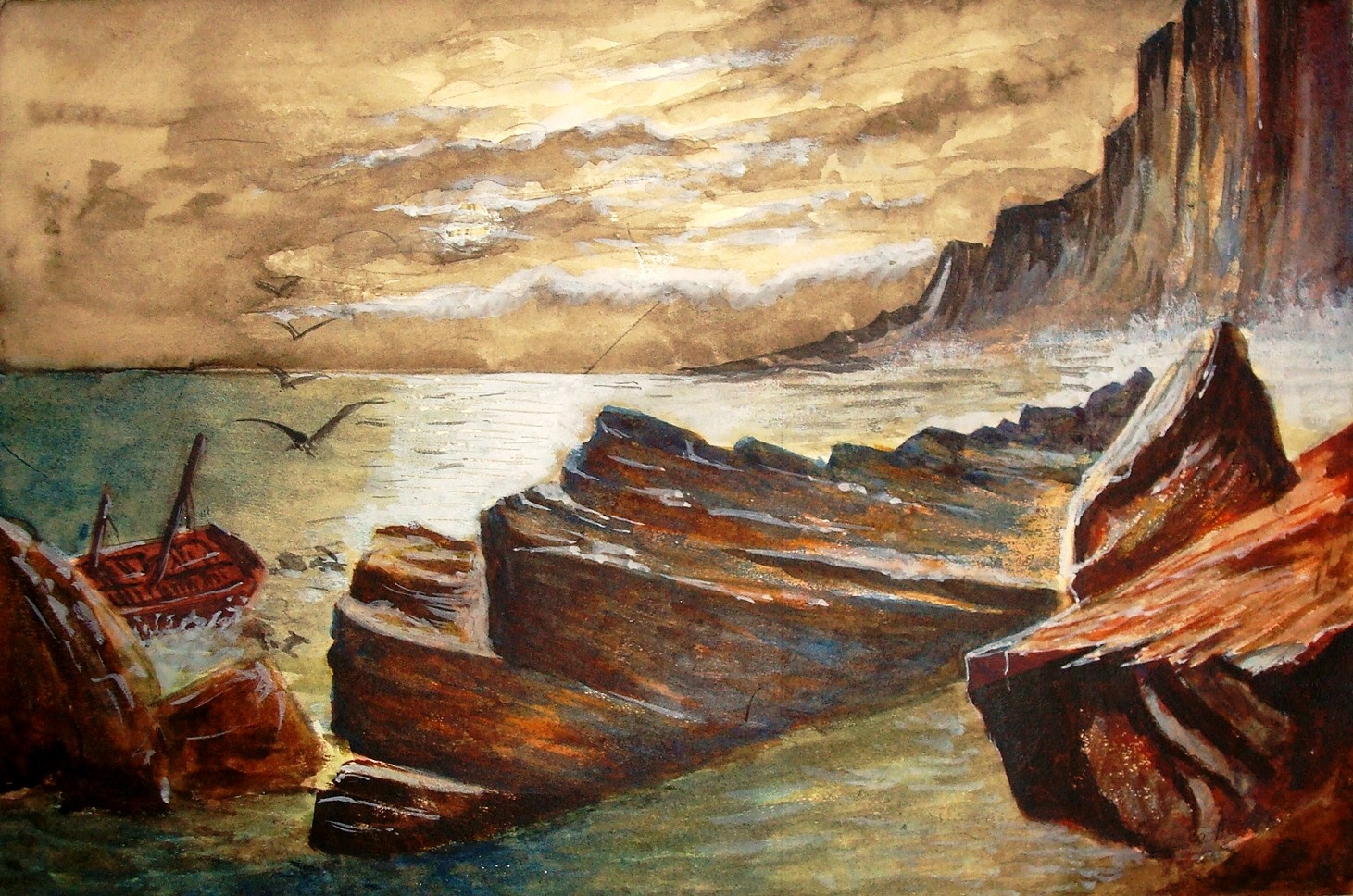
Shipwreck (watercolor, c.1910)

Upon returning home, his first solo exhibition came in 1919 at the Ateneo de Madrid. He continued to exhibit frequently and won numerous awards, including the third place medal at the National Exhibition of Fine Arts in 1922, and the second place medal there in 1926. In between, in 1925, he won a major award at the International Exhibition of Modern Industrial and Decorative Arts.

Throughout his life, Aguirre helped organize the festivities for the Bonfires of Saint John. He was also a prominent member of the Communist Party and a devoted Republican.

In 1931, following the establishment of the Second Republic, he became more involved in politics. During the Spanish Civil War, he followed the Republican government, first to Valencia, then Barcelona. His loyalty to the legitimate government forced him and his family to seek exile in France after the war. Pausing for a time in Paris, he went to Le Havre with the intention of emigrating to America.

But due to the German invasion in 1940, he was forced to flee south and was arrested while attempting to cross the border. He was taken to Ondarreta Prison in San Sebastián, where many Republicans were detained, then transferred to the notorious Porlier Prison in Madrid. He was executed there by garotte in 1942, aged 59, accused of "abetting the rebellion".

Major retrospectives of Aguirre's work have been held in Bilbao (1986), Pamplona and Barcelona (simultaneously in 1999) and Alicante, at the Gravina Museum of Fine Arts (2003). Two of his daughters also became well-known: Jesusa (b. 1932) as an artist, and Francisca (1930–2019) as a poet. His grandson is the poet Carlos Martínez Aguirre.
