= Guadalupe Grande =

Spanish poet (1965–2021)

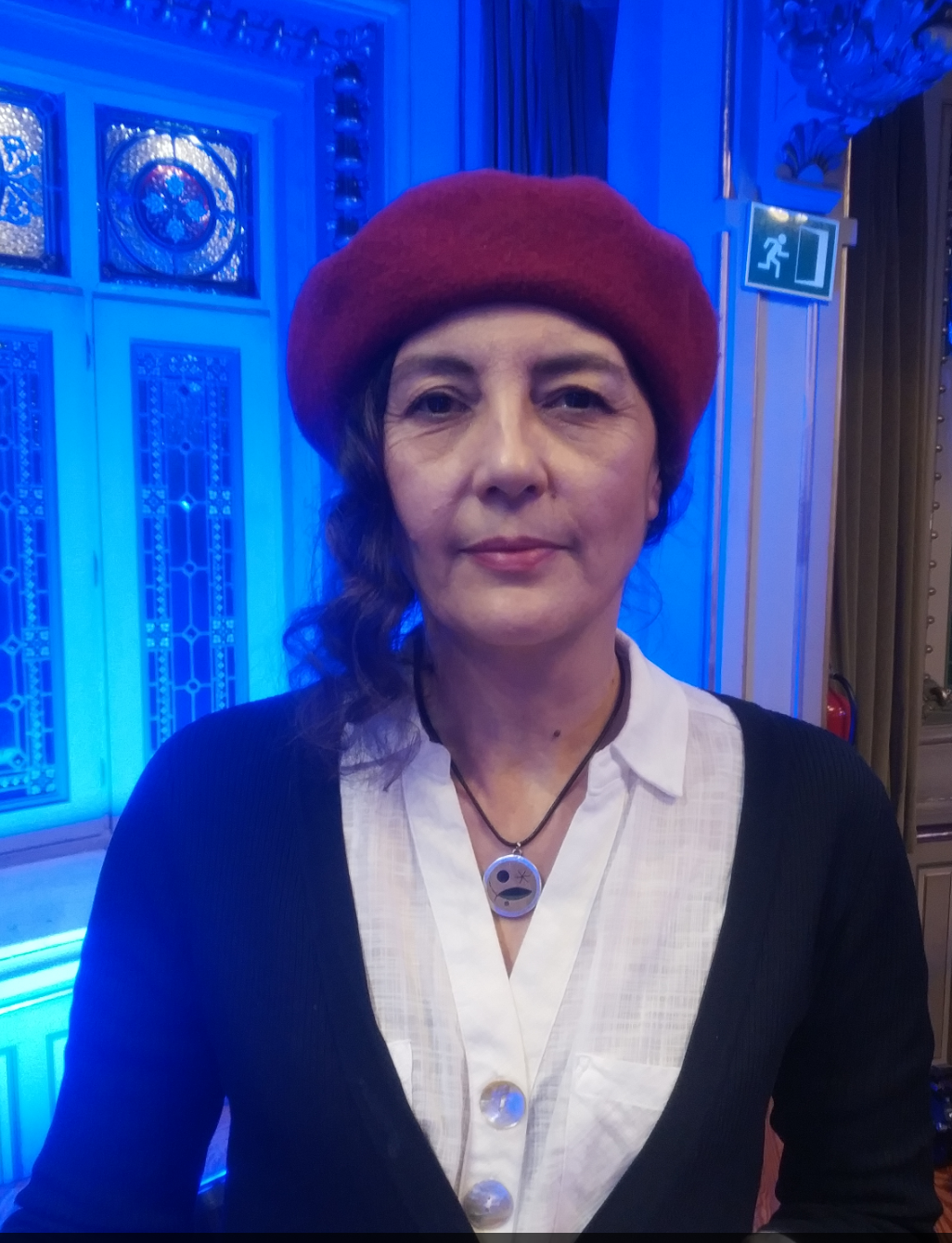
- Guadalupe Grande
- Born: Guadalupe Grande Aguirre; 30 May 1965; Madrid, Francoist Spain
- Died: 2 January 2021 (aged 55); Madrid, Spain
- Occupation: Poet

Guadalupe Grande Aguirre (30 May 1965 – 2 January 2021) was a Spanish poet. She had a degree in social anthropology from the Complutense University of Madrid.

== Biography ==
Guadalupe was the daughter of writer Félix Grande and was a cousin of poet Carlos Martínez Aguirre. A literary critic and teacher, she wrote El libro de Lilit in 1995, La llave de la niebla in 2003, and Mapas de cera in 2006. Grande died at the age of 55 due to coronavirus in his hometown of Madrid, Spain, on January 2, 2021.

As a literary critic, she has contributed since 1989 to various newspapers and cultural magazines, such as El Mundo, El Independiente, Cuadernos Hispanoamericanos, El Urogallo, and Reseña, among others.

In 2008, she was awarded the Valle-Inclán Grant for literary creation at the Spanish Academy in Rome. In the fields of publishing and cultural management, she has worked with various institutions, including the Summer Courses of the Complutense University of Madrid, Casa de América, and the Teatro Real. That same year, she also began experimenting with photography and collage.

== Bibliography ==
=== Anthologies ===
- De varia España (1997)
- Ellas tienen la palabra (1997)
- Poesía Ultimísima (1997)
- Norte y Sur de la poesía Iberoamericana (1998)
- Milenio (1999)
- Diálogo de la lengua. Pasar la página, poetas para el nuevo milenio (2000)
- Aldea Poética II (2000)
- Mujeres de carne y verso (2001)
- La voz y la escritura - 80 propuestas poéticas desde los viernes de la Cacharrería (2001)
- Monográfico sobre poesía femenina española de la Revista Zurgai (2004)
- 33 de Radio 3 (2004)
- Hilanderas (2006)

=== Essays ===
- El silencio en la obra de Juan Rulfo (1989)
- Literatura azteca, flores en el tiempo (1989)
- El flautista de Hamelin (1992)
- Las piedras, Rulfo, el tiempo (Pedro Páramo y la escultura) (1994)
- La identidad de los fragmentos (apuntes sobre poesía) (1997)
- La mirada creadora (1998)
- Concha Méndez: 'Con recuerdos de esperanzas y esperanzas de recuerdos' (1998)
- El sendero de la inocencia (las referencias religiosas en la poesía de César Vallejo) (1998)
- El personaje poético de la postmodernidad (2005)
- La aldea de sal (2009)

=== Literary critiques ===
- No para de llover (1996)
- Sobre el mito, la propia vida (1997)
- El libro de Lilit (1997)
- La ciudad desvestida (2003)
- Postales de asombro (2003)
- Naufragios y derrotas (2003)
