= Juan Antonio González Iglesias =

Spanish poet

Juan Antonio González Iglesias is a Spanish poet and translator. He was the 2006 winner of the Loewe Foundation International Poetry Prize.

== Prizes ==
- 1993: Premio Vicente Núñez
- ?: IV Premio Internacional de Poesía Generación del 27
- 2006: XIX Loewe Foundation International Poetry Prize

== Poetry ==
- La hermosura del héroe (Premio Vicente Núñez 1993)
- Esto es mi cuerpo (Visor, 1997)
- Vayamos hacia el norte aunque sea dando la vuelta por el sur (2001)
- ¿Qué consideración no merecen quienes han cometido atentados contra la belleza del mundo? (2002)
- Más hermosura (CELYA, 2002)
- Un ángulo me basta (IV Premio Internacional de Poesía Generación del 27, Visor, 2002)
- Olímpicas (El Gaviero Ediciones, 2005)
- Eros es más (XIX Premio Loewe, Visor, 2007).
- Del lado del amor (Poesía reunida 1994-2009)

== Essays ==
- Epitafio del fuego: IX Encuentro de Poetas Iberoamericanos : antología en homenaje a José Emilio Pacheco, celebrado en Salamanca en 2006. Juan Antonio González Iglesias y Francisca Noguerol Jiménez. Salamanca. Fundación Salamanca Ciudad de Cultura, 2006
- Antonio de Nebrija: Edad Media y Renacimiento. Coloquio Humanista Antonio de Nebrija (1 . 1992. Salamanca) Carmen Codoñer y Juan Antonio González Iglesias. Salamanca. Universidad de Salamanca. Ediciones Universidad Salamanca, 1997.

== Translations ==
- Anónimos y menores : 12 poetas latinos. Málaga. Rafael Inglada Ediciones, 1996.
- Arte de amar. Amores, de Ovidio. Madrid, Ediciones Cátedra, 1993.
- Poesías, de Catulo. Madrid, Ediciones Cátedra, 2006.
- Poemas de amor, de James Laughlin. Ourense, Ediciones Linteo S.L, 2007.
