= Yolanda Castaño =

Galician artist

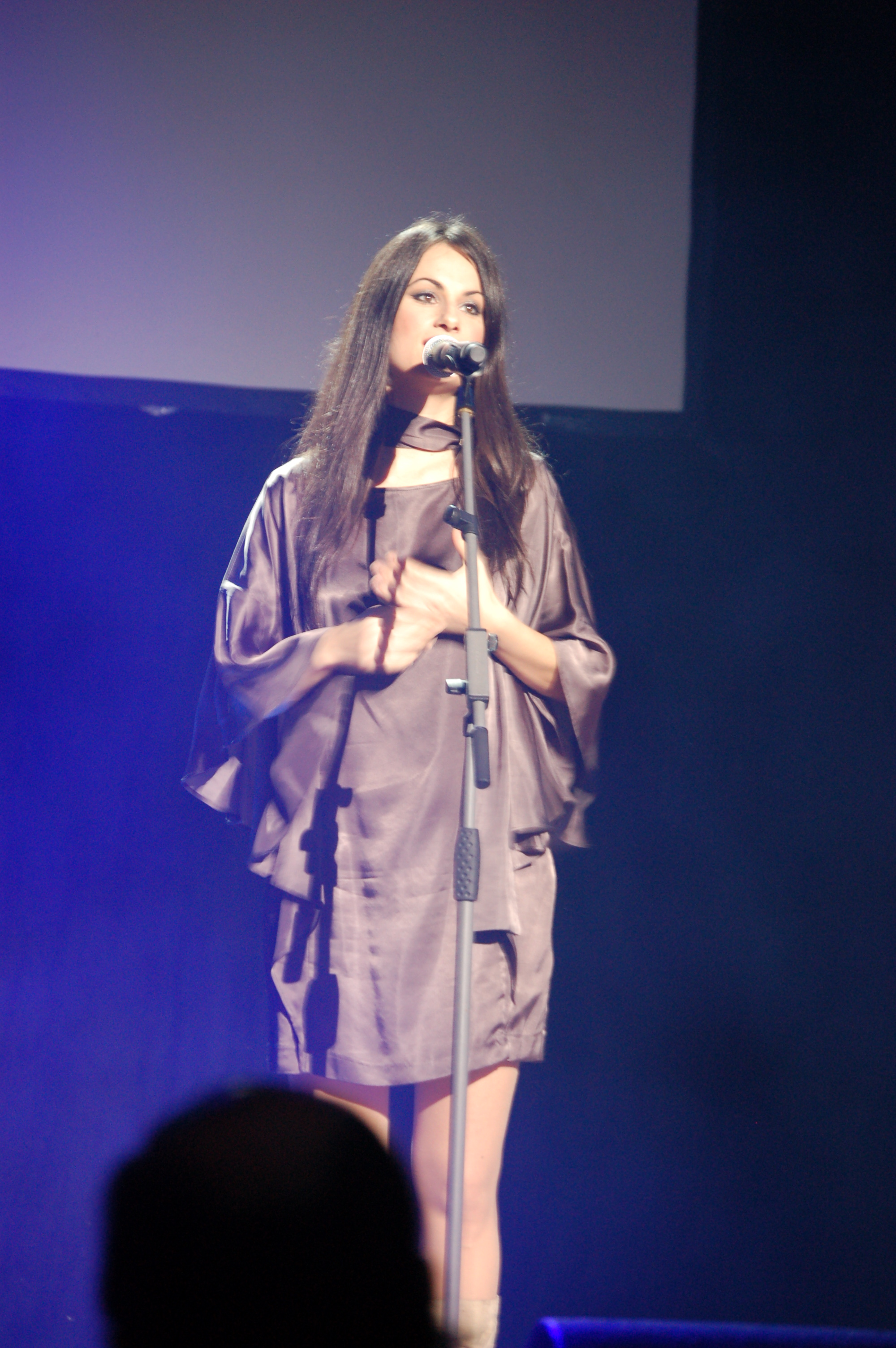
Castaño in 2008

Yolanda Castaño Pereira (Santiago de Compostela, 1977) is a Galician painter, literary critic and poet.

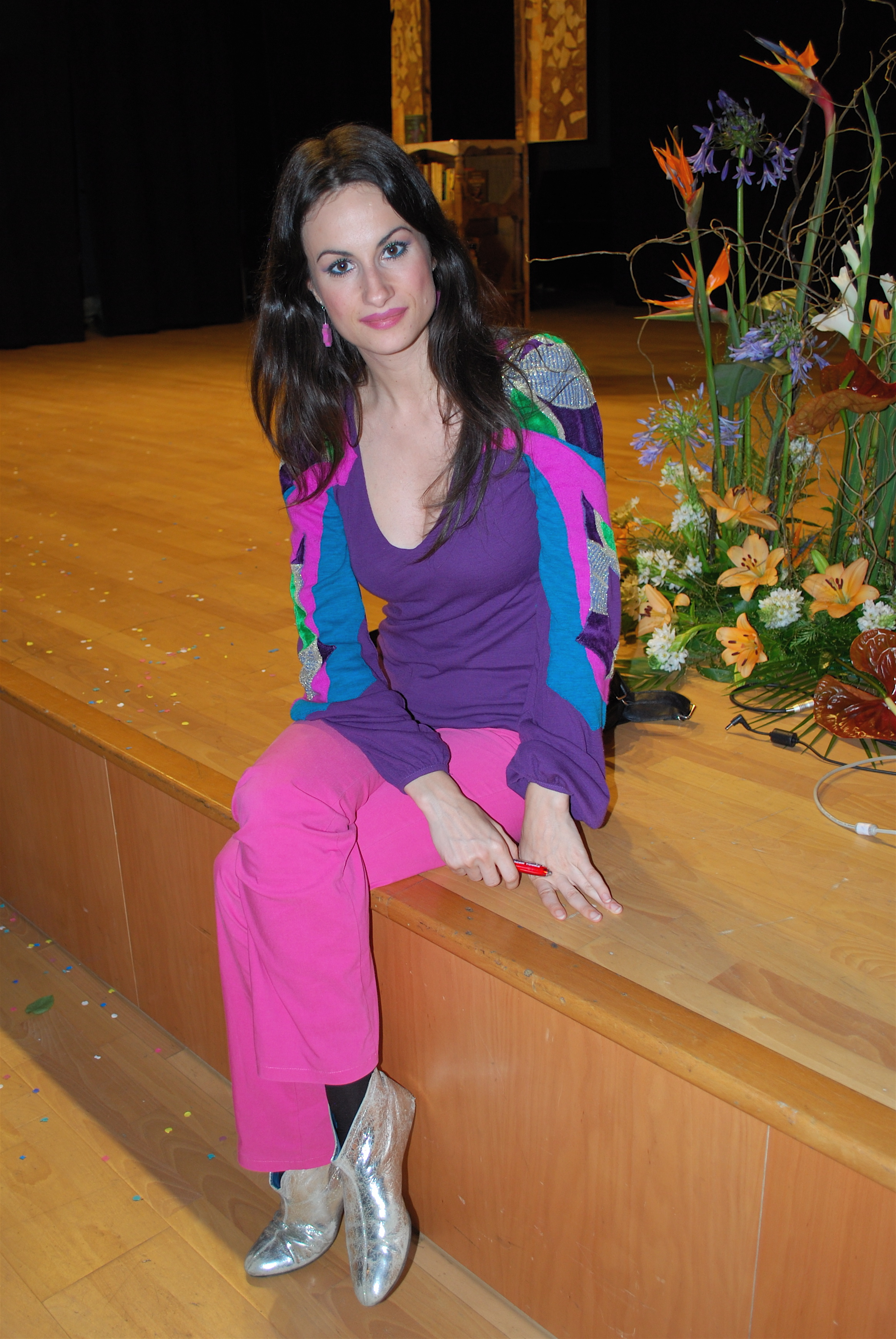
Castaño in 2010

Since 1990, she has lived in A Coruña, where she studied Spanish Philology and Audiovisual at the University of A Coruña.

She translated her poems to Spanish and has been the General Secretary at the Association of Galician-language Writers (Spanish: Asociación de Escritores en Lengua Gallega / Galician: Asociación de Escritores en Lingua Galega) and at Letras de Cal. She has also collaborated in several publications, such as Festa da palabra silenciada, Dorna, O Correo Galego (El Correo Gallego), A nosa terra and El Mundo.

Castaño is co-director of journal Valdeleite (together with Olga Novo) and works for the TV programme Cifras e Letras (TVG version of Countdown).

In 2023, she won National Poetry Award (Spain) for his book Materia.

== Works ==
- Elevar as pálpebras. Corunna: Espiral Maior, 1995.
- Delicia. Corunna: Espiral Maior, 1998.
- Edónica. Corunna: Espiral Maior, 2000.
- O libro da egoísta. Vigo: Galaxia S.A., 2003.
- Libro de la egoísta. Madrid: Visor, 2006.
- Profundidade de Campo. Corunna: Espiral Maior, 2007
- Erofanía, Espiral Maior, 2009
- A segunda lingua, PEN Clube de Galicia, 2014

== Awards ==
- Antonio García Hermida Award
- Atlántida Prize (1993)
- Francisco Fernández del Riego Prize
- III Fermín Bouza Brey Prize (1994)
- II John Carballeira Poetry Award (1997)
- Premio de la Crítica de poesía gallega (1998)
- Espiral Mayor Poetry Award (2007)
- National Poetry Award (Spain) (2023)
