= María Rosa de Gálvez =

Spanish poet and playwright (1768–1806)

- Born: María Antonia Rosalía de Gálvez y Ramírez; 14 August 1768; Málaga, Spain
- Died: 2 October 1806 (aged 38); Madrid, Spain
- Resting place: San Sebastian Church, Madrid
- Occupations: poet, playwright
- Spouse: José Cabrera Ramírez
- Writing career
- Language: Spanish
- Notable work: Obras poéticas

María Rosa de Gálvez or María Rosa Gálvez de Cabrera (14 August 1768 – 2 October 1806), was a Spanish poet and playwright during the Age of Enlightenment and Neoclassicism periods.

== Early years and family ==
María Antonia Rosalía de Gálvez y Ramírez was born on 14 August 1768 in Málaga. She was the adopted (or natural, according to Diaz de Escovar) daughter of Antonio de Gálvez y Gallardo, colonel of the army, and Mariana Ramírez de Velasco. She was a niece of José de Gálvez, minister of Charles III of Spain as well as a cousin Bernardo de Gálvez, Viceroy of New Spain and 1st Count of Gálvez. Before her marriage, she had a daughter María Josefa de la Pastora Irisarri y Gálvez, with José de Irisarri y Sarti.

== Career ==
In Málaga, Galvez married a distant cousin on 1789, Captain José Cabrera y Ramírez, and the couple moved to Madrid perhaps before 1790, as her name was mentioned several times in the "Diario" of Gaspar Melchor de Jovellanos in that year. There, she frequented the enlightened intellectual circles and developed a friendship with Manuel José Quintana and especially with Manuel Godoy, which made her husband jealous. Shortly after this, her husband was appointed as an attaché of the Spanish legation in the United States. Galvez stayed in Madrid, where she continued her alleged love affair with Godoy, the prime minister of Charles IV of Spain, which brought her the rebuffs of some as he sponsored Galvez's Obras poéticas (1804) without the corresponding payments for publication. This, in turn, affected judgment regarding the quality of her work as well as her status as a woman. In these years, the couple had one child, born in 1793, who died. Galvez moved temporarily to Madrid to follow closely some of the lawsuits of her husband. Three years later, shortly after a marriage reconciliation and possibly leaving behind some of the husband's debts, the couple moved to Puerto Real in Cádiz, where they held various properties. Modern scholarship describes alternate problems within the marriage.

Galvez devoted herself to developing her career as a writer, focused mainly on theater, journalism and lyricism. She wrote for Variedades de Ciencias, Literatura y Artes (1803-1805), the magazine published by Manuel José Quintana, as well as La Minerva o El Revisor General. Her Obras poéticas, which, despite the title, also incorporated the dramatic, appeared in three volumes (Madrid, Imprenta Real, 1804). Some of her plays were incorporated into the volume El teatro nuevo español (1801).

Straddled with great economic hardships, she died prematurely, in Madrid, 2 October 1806, at the age of 38, and was buried in the San Sebastian Church.

== Criticism and legacy ==
Something about her character made her appear modern and independent, vaguely disturbing her male contemporaries in a way which they could not understand. She was attacked by considerations unrelated to her intrinsic literary merit (her feminism, her independence, her moral conduct, alien to the values of the time, as well as her relationship with Godoy). Modern day criticism has put Galvez's work in a just, worthy and deserved place.

Galvez's name was honored in several ways, including the municipal library of Macharaviaya; while in Malaga, a street, a public primary school, and a lecture hall of the University of Malaga were named after her.

== Selected works ==
=== Obra original ===
- Ali-Bek. Tragedia original en cinco actos, Madrid, Benito García y Compañía, 1801, tomo V de Teatro Nuevo Español.
- Las esclavas amazonas, manuscritos 16507 y 17196 de la Biblioteca Nacional de España y manuscrito 1-28-14 A y B de la Biblioteca Municipal de Madrid.
- La familia a la moda, Ms. Tea 173-4, Biblioteca Municipal de Madrid.
- Un loco hace ciento. Comedia en un acto en prosa para servir de fin de fiesta, Madrid, Benito García y Compañía, 1801, tomo V de Teatro Nuevo Español.
- Obras poéticas de Doña Rosa Gálvez de Cabrera, Madrid, Imprenta Real, 1804, 3 vols.
  - Volumen I
    - "La Campaña de Portugal. Oda al Príncipe de la Paz".
    - "La beneficencia. Oda a la Condesa de Castroterreño".
    - "Las campañas de Buonaparte. Oda".
    - "La poesía. Oda a un amante de las artes de imitación".
    - "Descripción filosófica del Real Sitio de San Ildefonso. Oda a Quintana".
    - "La vanidad de los placeres. Oda".
    - "En los días de un amigo de la autora. Oda".
    - "En elogio de la representación de la opereta intitulada «El delirio». Oda".
    - "La noche. Canto en verso suelto a la memoria de la señora Condesa del Carpio".
    - "A Quintana en elogio de su oda al océano. Versos sáficos".
    - "Descripción de la Fuente de la Espina en el Real Sitio de Aranjuez. Romance endecasílabo".
    - "A Licio. Silva moral".
    - "Despedida al Real Sitio de Aranjuez. Octavas".
    - "Bion. Ópera lírica en un acto, traducida del francés".
    - "El egoísta. Comedia original en tres actos".
    - "Los figurones literarios. Comedia en tres actos".
  - Volumen II
    - "Saúl. Escena trágica unipersonal".
    - "Safo. Drama trágico en un acto".
    - "Florinda. Tragedia en tres actos".
    - "Blanca de Rossi. Tragedia en cinco actos".
  - Volumen III
    - "Amnón. Tragedia original en cinco actos".
    - "Zinda. Drama trágico en tres actos".
    - "La delirante. Tragedia original en cinco actos".
- Oda en elogio de la marina española, Madrid, Imprenta de Repullés, 1806.
- «Oda en elogio de las fumigaciones de Morvó, establecidas en España a beneficio de la humanidad, de orden del excelentísimo señor Príncipe de la Paz», Minerva o el Revisor General, III.52, 1806, pp. 3–10.
- Safo, drama trágico en un acto, Valencia, Imprenta de Estevan, 1813.
- Safo y Faón o el Salto de Leucades, Cádiz, Imprenta de Romero, 1820.
- Saúl, escena trágica unipersonal, Valencia, Imprenta de Estevan, 1813; Palma, Imprenta de Miguel Domingo, 1813.
- «Viaje al Teyde», Variedades de Ciencias, Literatura y Artes, II. 17 (1805), pp. 301–308.

=== Translations ===
- Bion, en Obras Poéticas, Madrid, Imprenta Real, 1804, tomo I, pp. 57–109. Traducción de Bion, comédie en un act et en vers, mêlée de musique (1803) con libreto de François-Benoît Hoffman y música de Étienne Méhul.
- Catalina, o la bella labradora. Comedia en tres actos, Madrid, Benito García y Compañía, 1801, (Teatro Nuevo Español, tomo V, pp. 233–352). Traducción de Catherine ou la belle fermière, comédie en trois acts et en prose, mêlée de chant (1793), de Amélie-Julie Candeille.
- La dama colérica o novia impaciente. Comedia en prosa en un acto, Barcelona, Juan Francisco Piferrer, s.a. Traducción de La jeune femme colère, comédie en un acte et en prose (1804) de Charles-George Étienne.
- La intriga epistolar. Comedia en tres actos y verso, manuscrito 21.261 (1), 84 fols., Biblioteca Nacional de España. Traducción de L'intrigue épistolaire, comédie en cinq acts et en vers (1792), de Philippe Fabre d'Églantine.

=== Modern editions ===
- Ali-Bek, Sevilla, La Máquina China, 2007.
- Amnón, Málaga, Universidad de Málaga, 2009.
- La familia a la moda: Comedia en tres actos y en verso, edición de René Andioc, Salamanca, Plaza Universitaria, 2001.
- Holocaustos a Minerva. Obra escogida, edición de Aurora Luque, Málaga, Fundación Lara, 2013.
- Un loco hace ciento, edición de Ana María Marcos. Biblioteca Virtual de Andalucía.
- Poesías: María Rosa de Gálvez, edición de Aurora Luque, Málaga, Diputación Provincial de Málaga, 2007.
- Safo, edición de Daniel Whitaker, Dieciocho, 18,2 (1995), pp. 189–210.
- «Safo. El egoísta», en Aurora Luque y José Luis Cabrera, El valor de una ilustrada. María Rosa de Gálvez, Málaga, Ayuntamiento de Málaga, 2005, pp. 143–271.
- Safo. Zinda. La familia a la moda, edición de Fernando Doménech, Madrid, Asociación de Directores de Escena de España, 1995.

=== Bibliography ===
- Perez, Janet; Ihrie, Maureen (2002). The Feminist Encyclopedia of Spanish Literature: A-M. Greenwood Publishing Group. ISBN 978-0-313-32444-4.
