= Félix Grande =

Spanish poet

Félix Grande Lara (4 February 1937 in Mérida - 30 January 2014 in Madrid) was a Spanish poet and flamenco expert. He won the Premio Adonáis de Poesía for his poem Las piedras in 1963. He won a Casa de las Américas Prize for his poem Blanco Spirituals in 1967. He won a Felipe Trigo Award for El marido de Alicia in 1994. He was awarded the Premio Nacional de las Letras Españolas in 2004. He was married to poet Francisca Aguirre, with whom he had a daughter, poet Guadalupe Grande.
