= List of National Prizes (Ministry of Culture, Spain) =

Spain's Ministry of Culture awards the following National Prizes.

- National Prize for Spanish Literature
- National Literature Prizes:
  - Essays
  - Drama
  - Infants' and children's literature
  - Narrative (Novel)
  - Poetry
  - Poetry for Young People “Miguel Hernández”
- National Prize for History of Spain
- National Prize for the Best Translation
- National Prize for the Work of a Translator
- National Comic Prize
- National Illustration Prize
- National Prize for Cultural Journalism
- National Prize for the Promotion of Reading
- National Prize for the Best Cultural Editorial Work

== See also ==
- List of Premios Nacionales de Literatura (Spain)
