= List of people from Toledo, Spain =

== People who were born at Toledo ==
This is a list of notable people who were born at Toledo, Spain.

- Abd ar-Rahman II
- Abū Ishāq Ibrāhīm al-Zarqālī
- Alfonso Martínez de Toledo
- Alfonso Salmeron
- Alfonso X of Castile
- Alonso Andrada
- Álvarez de Paz
- Ana González (fashion designer)
- Anselmo Lorenzo
- Beatriz Villacañas
- Blas de Prado
- Blas Piñar
- Brunhilda of Austrasia
- Diego de Covarrubias y Leyva
- Diego Duque de Estrada
- Diego Ortiz
- Elvira Moragas Cantarero
- Emilio Esteban Infantes
- Ferdinand II of León
- Fernando Niño de Guevara
- Francisco Cervantes de Salazar
- Francisco de Amberes
- Francisco de Rojas Zorrilla
- Francisco de Vergara
- Gabriel de Espinosa
- Garcilaso de la Vega (poet)
- Gustavo Morales
- Feliciano López
- Francisco del Rincón
- Helladius of Toledo
- Hernando de Talavera
- Hernando de Ávila
- Ibn al-Wafid
- Ildefonsus
- Isaac Israeli ben Joseph
- Isaac Aboab of Castile
- Isaac ibn Latif
- Javier Lozano Cid
- Jerónima de la Asunción
- Joanna of Castile
- Joey Kelly
- Jorge Manuel Theotocópuli
- José Díaz Morales
- Juan Antonio Villacañas
- Joseph Karo
- Juan Alfon
- Juan Castro (bishop)
- Juan González de Mendoza
- Judah Halevi
- Juan López de Padilla
- Julian of Toledo
- Luis Enrique Peñalver
- Luis Quiñones de Benavente
- Luis Tristán
- Lucas Vázquez de Ayllón
- Mark of Toledo
- Nicolás de Vergara el Mozo
- Pedro de Lagarto
- Pedro de Ribadeneira
- Pedro Laso de la Vega
- Pedro Machuca
- Peter of Toledo
- Petrus Petri
- Rahel la Fermosa
- Ricardo Arredondo Calmache
- Saint Marciana of Toledo
- Sancho III of Castile
- Tania (tango singer)
- Todros ben Judah Halevi Abulafia
- Tomás Barros Pardo

== People who lived at Toledo ==
This is a list of notable people who had their main residence in Toledo during most of their life.

- Abraham ibn Daud
- Charles V, Holy Roman Emperor
- El Greco
- Judah ben Asher
- Raymond de Sauvetât
- Samuel ha-Levi

== See also ==
- Eleanor of Toledo
