= Juan Antonio Villacañas =

Spanish poet, essayist and critic (1922–2001)

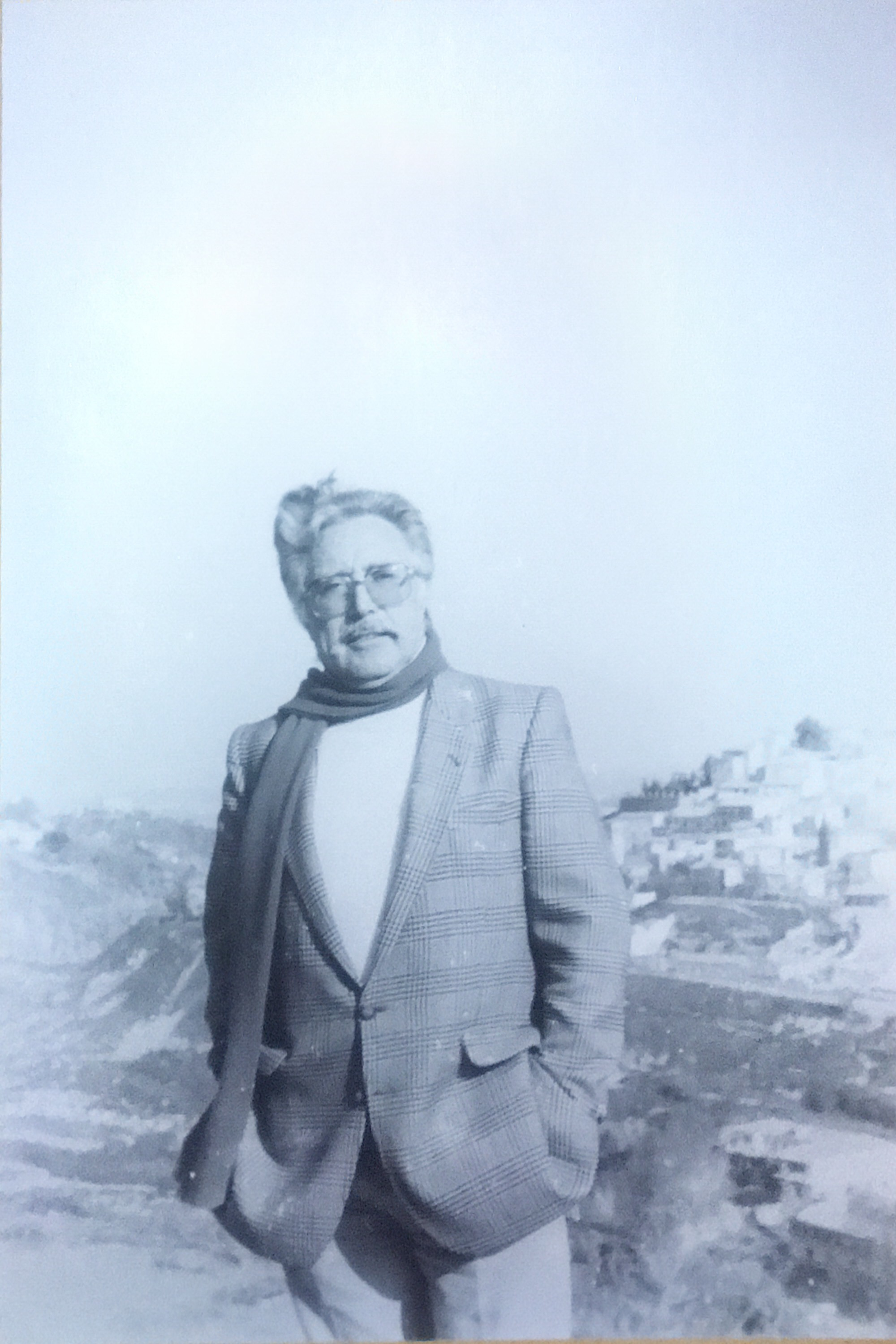
- Born: 1922; Toledo, Spain
- Died: 2001 (aged 78–79); Toledo, Spain
- Occupations: Poet, literary critic
- Writing career
- Genre: Poetry

Juan Antonio Villacañas (born 1922 in Toledo; died August 21, 2001) was a Spanish poet, essayist and critic. In 2015, he was named distinguished son ("hijo predilecto") of the city of Toledo.

== Biography ==
Born in Toledo in 1922, the Civil War cut short his secondary education. Obligatory military service was carried out in places as different as Melilla and the Pyrenean Valley of Arán. In the former, he was placed in charge of the reorganisation of the Military Club library and he took advantage of the opportunity to develop an intense autodidactic process, reading avidly and widely. On returning to Toledo, he was employed by the Town Council where he was later to take charge of the area of Art and Culture, a post he held for many years. His book of poetry Los Sapos (1968) is an indictment of power and its abuses, where a Town Council is at the same time a reality and a metaphor of such power.

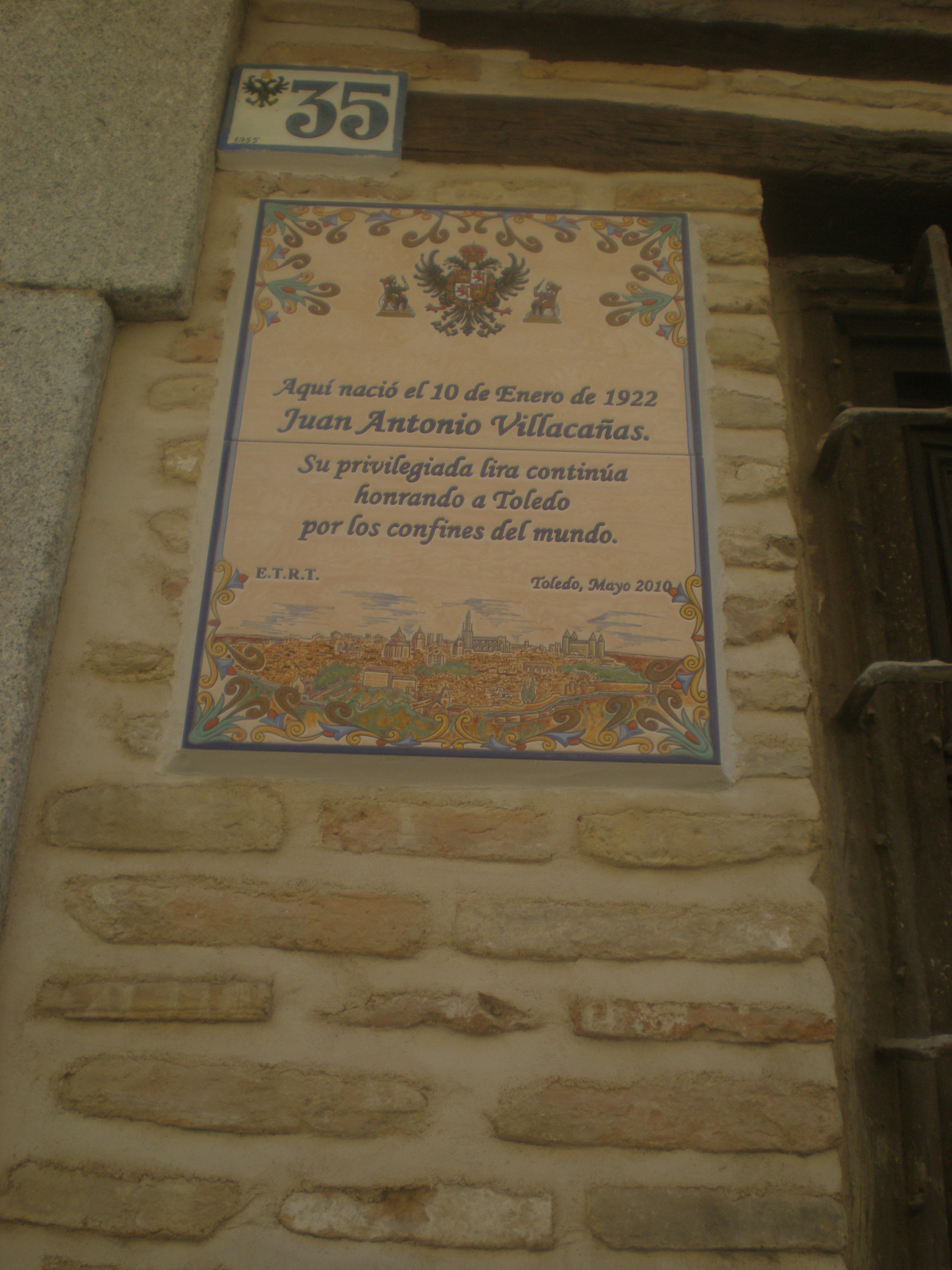
Plaque commemorating the birthplace of Juan Antonio Villacañas in Toledo

In 1956, he was invited by the Belgian Academy of French language and literature to the III Biennale Internationale de Poésie de Knokke-le-Zoute (Belgium). His close friendship with the Hispanicist and poet Edmond Vandercammen dates from this period. The latter reviewed his Conjugación Poética del Greco in Le Journal des Poètes (1959) and translated several of Juan Antonio’s poems into French, all appearing in the said Journal (1972). Following his stay in Belgium, he was interviewed at the UNESCO in Paris where his voice was recorded for a special broadcast for Spanish America. From the 1950s onwards, the work of Juan Antonio Villacañas begins to appear in both national and international poetry anthologies. At the same time, extracts from his poetic and critical works was to appear in different journals and newspapers.

Villacañas lived in Toledo throughout his life, remaining independent of groups and literary trends and following his own poetic and personal course. Such personal and artistic independence was to bring the toll of silence and neglect from the established groups and critical trends from the 1980s onwards.

However, from 2001 onwards, the number of poets and critics, both Spanish and foreign, that admire Villacañas' work increases. This revival, coming after the break of these decades of the twentieth century, shows once again, the importance of Juan Antonio Villacañas. Relevant in this respect are the appreciations of such poets and critics as Emilio Porta, Pablo Luque Pinilla, Roberto Carlos Hernández Ferro, Enrique Gracia and Michael Smith. In 2010, the annual book fair of Toledo was dedicated to Juan Antonio Villacañas. The opening speech was said by his daughter, Beatriz Villacañas

== Works ==
Juan Antonio Villacañas wrote thirty three books of poetry, spanning a wealth of themes and forms, from free verse (as early as the 1950s) to the sonnet, from stanzas and rhymes of his own invention to the lira: Juan Antonio Villacañas infused this classical form with new and surprising content, so much so that his liras are now known as "Liras juanantonianas". To honour the mastery of Juan Antonio Villacañas regarding the lira, Juan Ruiz de Torres invented a new form deriving from this one, called decilira. In addition to poetry, he also produced an ample work of criticism and essays (these were to appear in a wide variety of publications as for instance La Estafeta Literaria y Nueva Estafeta, directed by Luis Rosales) and two prose books: Bécquer o la Poesía de Todos (awarded the Círculo de Escritores y Poetas Iberoamericanos de Nueva York prize in 1971) y Versómanos (1989).

In the latter, Villacañas exposes the fallacies underlying a great part of the predominant poetry criticism of that time. Poems, reviews, short stories and writings of different types can be found in such publications as ABC, Poesía Española (1ª y 2ª Épocas), Diario Ya, Poesía Hispánica, Diario de León, Le Journal des Poètes and El Mercurio de Chile. In the seventies, Juan Antonio Villacañas explores a new way of creating: the union of poem and image to construct a unity of significance that he called “liriforma”. An exhibition of these “liriformas” took place in the Palace of Benacazón in Toledo in 1976. These “liriformas” form together, a book called Testamento de Carnaval. Together with some other media, the periodical La Estafeta Literaria covered the news interviewing the author in the Nº 579, 1 January 1976.

=== Poetry ===
- 1952, Navegando en la Noche (Sailing the Night)
- 1952, Legionario del Mundo (Legionnaire of the World)
- 1953, Brisas Íntimas (Intimate Breezes)
- 1954, Palabras (Words)
- 1954, El Tiempo Justo (The Exact Time)
- 1955, El Diluvio Universal (The Universal Deluge)
- 1957, La Estatua Animada (The Animated Statue)
- 1958, Conjugación Poética del Greco (Poetical Conjugation of El Greco)
- 1960, Marcha Destriunfal (De-Triumphant March)
- 1961, Música en las Colinas (Music on the Hills)
- 1962, Los Vagos Pensamientos (Vague Thoughts)
- 1964, Sala de Juego (Games Arcade)
- 1965, La Llama entre los Cerezos (The Flame among the Cherry Trees)
- 1968, Los Sapos (The Toads)
- 1969, Cárcel de la Libertad (Jail of Freedom)
- 1971, Las Humanas Heridas de las Piedras (The Human Wounds of Stones)
- 1973, Rebelión de un Recién Nacido (Revolt of a Newborn)
- 1975-1976, Testamento del Carnaval (Liriformas)/ Carnival’s Testament (Liriformas)
- 1980, El Dante en Toledo (Dante in Toledo)
- 1980-1984, Estado de Gracia (Included in Argumento de Mi Biografía –2000- as Cartas Pasión con Tetis 1980)/ State of Grace (Included in Theme of my Biography-2000- as “Passion-Letters with Tetis 1980”)
- 1990, 20 Poemas de Antón y una Canción Inesperada (Twenty Poems by Antón and a Song Unexpected)
- 1991, El Humor Infinito de la Historia (The Infinite Humour of History)
- 1993, Homenaje a la Lira en Larga Sobremesa con Luciano (Homage to the Lire in a Long After-Dinner with Lucian)
- 1995, Se Equivocó el Profeta (The Prophet was Mistaken)
- 1995, Las Tentaciones de Sanjuanantonio (Saint Johnanthony’s Temptations)
- 1996, A Muerto por Persona (A Death for each Man)
- 1996, Al Margen de lo Transitable / On the Fringes of the Passable (under his pen name Juan Amor de Velasco)
- 1996, Antología Poética (Poetic Anthology)
- 1997, Sublevación de la Melancolía (Uprising of Melancholy)
- 1998, Sandemonio en la Gloria (Saint Demon in Heaven)
- 1998, Sublimación de la Desobediencia (Sublimation of Disobedience)
- 1999, Balbuciendo (Babbling)
- 2000, Argumento de la Poesía (Theme of Poetry)
- 2000, Déjame al Conde-Duque, que lo mato / Leave the Conde-Duque to me and I’ll Kill him (under his pen name Juan Amor de Velasco)
- 2001, La Soberbia del Gesto / The Pride of Gesture (Unpublished)
- 2009, Juan Antonio Villacañas: Selected Poems. Bilingual Edition Spanish/ English. Translation by Michael Smith and Beatriz Villacañas. Edition: Luis Ingelmo. Shearsman. United Kingdom

=== Essays ===
- 1971, Bécquer o la Poesía de Todos
- 1989, Versómanos

=== Prizes and honors ===
- Toledo de Periodismo, 1957.
- Gran Duque de Alba, 1963.
- Países Hispánicos, 1964.
- Premio Provincia de León, 1965.
- Juan de Baños, 1965.
- Nacional de Literatura de Tema Deportivo, 1966.
- Instituto de Cultura Hispánica, 1967.
- Justas Poéticas Ayuntamiento de Madrid 1968.
- Ausias March 1969.
- Premio Círculo de Escritores y Poetas Iberoamericanos de Nueva York.

In 2000, he was proposed by the Real Academia de Bellas Artes y Ciencias Históricas de Toledo as a candidate for the Premio Reina Sofía de Poesía Iberoamericana.

=== Anthologies ===
Juan Antonio Villacañas appears, amongst others, in the following anthologies:

- Antologías de Poesía Española, 1955–1956; 1956–1957; 1961–1962; 1963–1964; 1964-1965. Luis Jiménez Martos, Aguilar.
- Poésie Espagnole Contemporaine, 1962. Templeuve.
- La Poesía Española en 1961, 1963. Cuadernos Bibliográficos VIII, CSIC.
- Panorama Poético Español, 1965. Luis López Anglada. Editora Nacional.
- Antología Bilingüe (Español-Inglés) de la Poesía Española Moderna, 1965. Helen Wohl Patterson. Ediciones Cultura Hispánica.
- Quién es Quién en las Letras Españolas. Primera Edición: Guillermo Díaz Plaja, 1969. Ediciones consecutivas 1973 y 1979. Instituto Nacional del Libro Español.
- Poetas Sociales Españoles, 1974. José Gerardo Manrique de Lara. Epesa.
- Poesía Castellana de Cárcel, 1976, José María Balcells. Dirosa.
- Poesía Erótica en la España del Siglo XX, 1978, Jacinto López Gorgé y F. Salgueiro. Vox.
- Antología-Homenaje a Teresa de Jesús, 1982, Colección Poesía Nueva, Madrid.
- Poetas de Hoy en España y América, 1983, Colección Poesía Nueva, Madrid.
- Jornadas de Poesía Luso-Española, 1983, Taller Prometeo de Poesía, Madrid.
- La Cultura en Castilla-La Mancha y sus Raíces, 1984, Textos de Rafael Morales y Ficha Bio-Bibliográfica de Francisco Fúster Ruiz, Junta de Comunidades de Castilla-La Mancha.
- Quién es Quién en Poesía, 1985, Prometeo, Madrid.
- Poetas de Castilla-La Mancha (1939-1985), 1986, Alfredo Villaverde, Patronato Municipal de Cultura, Ayuntamiento de Guadalajara.
- Antología Ibero-Americana de la Guitarra, 1987, Luis F. Leal Pinar. Editorial Alpuerto, Madrid.
- Poetas Hispanoamericanos para el Tercer Milenio, 1993, Alfonso Larrahona Kästen, México.
- Cantores del Corpus Christi, Antología de Poesía Lírica Toledana, 1996, Elizabeth Wilhelmsen (Selección, Introducción y Documentación) General Editor: Robert Laner, Ibérica, Vol. 13, Peter Lang, New York, Washington, DC.
- Guitarra de 26 Cuerdas, Antología Bilingüe Español-Ruso. Juan Ruiz de Torres, Yuri Shashkov y Victor Andreev. Asociación de Hispanistas de San Petersburgo.

== Bibliography ==
- Aller, César, 1968, Los Sapos, by Juan Antonio Villacañas, Poesía Española, 2ª Época. Nº 184, April.
- Arias de la Canal, Fredo, 2004, Antología de la Poesía Cósmica y Tanática de Juan Antonio Villacañas, Frente de Afirmación Hispanista, Mexico.
- Barrero, Hilario, 1968, “Los Sapos, Juan Antonio Villacañas”, Aldonza, Revista de Poesía, Alcalá de Henares, Nº 44, June.
- Castro, J.A. 1964, Sala de juego, by Juan Antonio Villacañas, La Voz de Talavera, 29 April.
- Gallego Morell, A. 1969, Literatura de tema deportivo, Madrid: Prensa Española: “Cerca de hoy, tras la Olimpiada de Tokio, un libro de poesía deportiva, La Llama entre los Cerezos, libro excelente, definitivo, para mantener vivo un tema literario”, p. 113.
- Gallego Morell, A. “Poesía y Deporte”, 1982, ABC-Sábado Cultural, 6 de Febrero.
- González-Guerrero, Antonio, 1994, “La importancia de llamarse Juan Antonio”, El Día de Cuenca y de Toledo, 1 de Diciembre. Also published in Arboleda, Palma de Mallorca, Nº 38, Septiembre 1995.
- Jiménez Martos, L. 1965, “Juan Antonio Villacañas: La Llama entre los Cerezos. La estafeta Literaria, Nº 331.
- “Sublevación de la melancolía, de Juan Antonio Villacañas”, Carta de la Poesía, Madrid, Nº 53.
- “Sublimación de la desobediencia, de Juan Antonio Villacañas”, Carta de la Poesía, Nº 55.
- Jurado Morales, J. 1971, “Cárcel de la Libertad y Las Humanas Heridas de las Piedras, de Juan Antonio Villacañas”, Azor, Barcelona, Nº 45, Diciembre.
- López Anglada, L. 1964 “Sala de Juego, de Juan Antonio Villacañas”, El Español, Madrid, 4 de Julio.
- López Gorgé, J. 1974, Juan Antonio Villacañas, Rebelión de un Recién Nacido”, La Estafeta Literaria, Nº 541, Junio.
- López Martínez, J. 1975, “Un Estudio sobre la Vida y Obra de Bécquer: Bécquer o la Poesía de Todos, by Juan Antonio Villacañas, Diario YA, Madrid, 12 June.
- De Luis, Leopoldo, 1954, “El Tiempo Justo, by Juan Antonio Villacañas”, Poesía Española, Nº35, Noviembre.
- Manrique de Lara, J. G. 1964,”Sala de Juego, by Juan Antonio Villacañas”, Poesía Española, 2ª Época Nº 138, June.
- Morales, Rafael, 1965, “Nuevos cantos olímpicos, La Llama entre los Cerezos, by Juan Antonio Villacañas”, Libros de Poesía, Arriba, Madrid, 10 January.
- Morales, Rafael, 1968, “La Poesía Social de Juan Antonio Villacañas”. Arriba, Madrid, 3 March.
- Muñoz, Mª. J. 1995, “Se equivocó el profeta, último libro de Juan Antonio Villacañas, ABC Toledo, 23 August.
- Murciano, Carlos, 1971, “Cárcel de la Libertad, by Juan Antonio Villacañas”, Poesía Hispánica, September.
- Murciano, Carlos, 1989, “Juan Antonio Villacañas: Versómanos”, Valor de la Palabra, Revista de la Asociación Prometeo de Poesía.
- Palomino, Ángel, 2001, “Villacañas”, ABC, 17 October.
- Porta, Emilio, “La Poesía de Juan Antonio Villacañas: Argumento de una Biografía-Obra Poética 1960-1984”, Mirador. Revista de la Asociación de Escritores y Artistas Españoles. Nº 8, March, 2004.
- Presa, Vicente, 1974, “Poesía para el Tiempo: Juan Antonio Villacañas”, El Diario de León, 27 October.
- Ruiz de Torres, Juan, 1997, “Antología Poética by Juan Antonio Villacañas”, Carta de la Poesía, Madrid, Nº 48, January.
- Sander, Carlos, 1961, “Marcha Destriunfal”, El Mercurio de Chile, 9 April.
- Sander, Carlos, 1962, “Conjugación Poética del Greco”, El Mercurio de Chile, 15 April.
- Ulyses (Ángel Palomino), 1973, “Rebelión de un Recién Nacido”, De Tomo y Lomo, La Codorniz.
- Umbral, Francisco, 1960, “Marcha Destriunfal”, Madrid Literario. El Norte de Castilla, March.
- Vandercammen, E. 1959, “Juan Antonio Villacañas: Conjugación Poética del Greco”, Le Journal des Poètes, Livres Espagnols, Bruselas, Nº2, Février.
- Villacañas, Beatriz, 2003, La Poesía de Juan Antonio Villacañas: Argumento de una Biografía -Obra Poética 1960-1984-), Junta de Comunidades de Castilla-La Mancha, Consejería de Educación y Cultura. Toledo.

=== Radio programmes dedicated to Juan Antonio Villacañas ===
- 1953, “Brisas Íntimas, por Juan Antonio Villacañas”, Índice de Libros y Revistas, Script: Valentín Gutiérrez de Miguel, Radio Madrid, Cadena Ser, 16 July.
- 1956, “De Libro en Libro”, Radio Nacional de España, 23 July. Section run by Ignacio Catalán.
- 1959, “Un Poeta de Altura Excepcional: Juan Antonio Villacañas”, by Manuel Ostos Gabella, Radio Manises, 6 March.
- 1960, “El Poeta y Sus Libros: Juan Antonio Villacañas”, Interviewed by Felisa Sanz, Radio España, 23 Julio.
- 1960, “Marcha Destriunfal, de Juan Antonio Villacañas, Aldebarán, Sala de Lectura, León, 16 March.
- 1962, “Los Vagos Pensamientos. Juan Antonio Villacañas”, La Palabra en el Tiempo, Radio Nacional de España, 1 July.
- 1965, “Juan Antonio Villacañas. La Llama entre los Cerezos”, Programa: Crítica de Libros, Script: Basilio Gassent, Radio Madrid, Cadena Ser, 4 December.
- 1968, “Juan Antonio Villacañas: Los Sapos”, Programa: Crítica de Libros. Script: Basilio Gassent, Radio Madrid, Cadena Ser, 26 February.
- 1969, “Geografía Poética de España. Poemas de Juan Antonio Villacañas”, Radio Nacional de España, División de Programas Educativos, 31 July.
- 1972, “Antologías de Viva Voz: Juan Antonio Villacañas”, por Acacia Uceta, Radio Nacional de España, III Programa, 28 April.
- 1972, “Juan Antonio Villacañas. Las Humanas Heridas de las Piedras”, Programa: Crítica de Libros. Guión: Basilio Gassent, 13 January.
- 1982, “El Dante, en Toledo, de Juan Antonio Villacañas”, por Enrique Domínguez Millán, Revista de Libros, Radio Nacional de España, Radio 3, 22–28 March.
- 1985, “Entrevista a Juan Antonio Villacañas”, por José Hierro, Aula Poética, Radio Nacional de España, 24 March.
