= The Farmer with the Most Air =

1937 play in verse by Miguel Hernández

- Author: Miguel Hernández
- Language: Spanish
- Genre: Social theatre
- Publication date: 1937
- Publication place: Spain
- Preceded by: Los hijos de la piedra (1935)
- Followed by: Teatro en la guerra (1937)

The Farmer with the Most Air (Spanish: El Labrador de más Aire) is a 1936 play, one of the first written by the Spanish poet Miguel Hernández. This work is part of the social theatre of Hernandez's literary work. It is the main dramatic piece in verse by the poet from Orihuela, of clear social intention, as it shows Miguel Hernandez's concern for the problems of the time he lived in, in the middle of the Spanish Civil War.

== Historical context ==
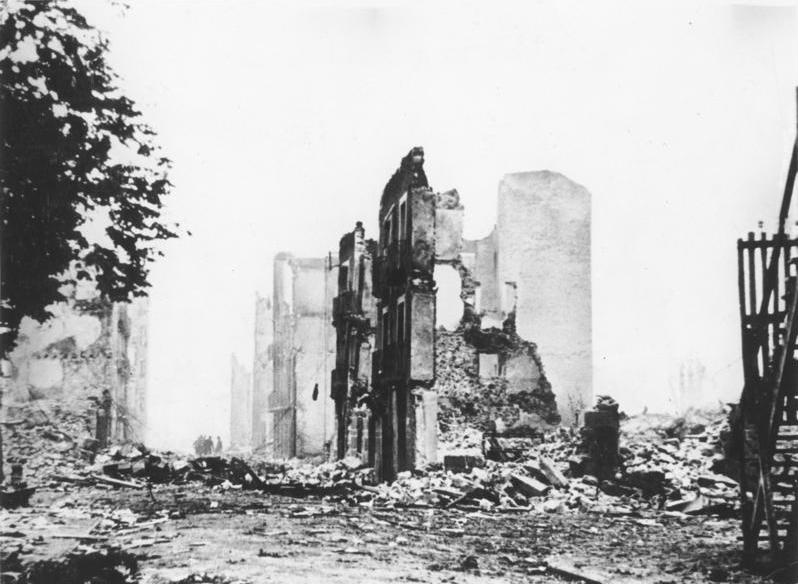
Bombing of Guernica in 1937. Example of the author's environment when he composed this play.

This work by Miguel Hernández was written in 1936 and published in 1937. Previously, in 1935, he had written Los hijos de la piedra (The sons of the stone), another play in which he denounced and criticized the situation of the people of his time, their conditions and their rights. However, The Farmer with the Most Air was the most critical work of Hernández, and was curiously published before his imprisonment. Parallel to Miguel Hernández, other authors wrote works with similar themes such as the tragic fate and love, such as Federico García Lorca's The House of Bernarda Alba (La casa de Bernarda Alba).

In the same year he wrote The Farmer with the Most Air, Hernández enlisted in the Popular Army of the Republic and he was appointed as Commissary of Culture. He participated in several battles, acting as soldier and poet, and was writing works of social protest such as his play Theater in War Time (Teatro en la guerra). During the war, he escaped to his homeland to marry Josefina Manresa and published Wind from the Town (Viento del pueblo), Poetry in the war (Poesía en la guerra), Theater in the war (Teatro en la guerra), and The Farmer with the Most Air (El labrador de más aire).

== Theme ==
Although the play was published in 1937, it was not performed until the autumn of 1972. The author from Orihuela exposes in his dramatic play a love theme with a critical character, describing social problems related to the time he was living at that moment, such as the desire for power of an authoritarian leader and the poverty of innocent citizens.

Miguel Hernández presented a sequence of plot cycles in his work. Judging by the year and the plot, it can be observed that the work is in the middle of a period of transition from one cycle to another, since it began to be written in 1936, with the cycle of hernandian love, and ended in 1937, with the cycle of the story.

Influenced by Lope de Vega, Miguel Hernández composed this theatrical work written in verse, easy to understand, entertaining, with themes that were popular at the time, such as the peasant love, and with a critic intentionality.

== Structure and metric ==
It consists of three acts divided into frames that help to a better understanding of the scenes.

The first act has two frames, with the first one having eight scenes and the second one four more. There is a brief presentation of the characters in this act. This is followed by the different feelings and thoughts about the protagonist, other characters and the situation in the village.

The second act is composed of three frames; the first frame with three scenes, the second one with four and the third one with eight. Here takes place the action that leads to the confrontation and subsequent enmity between the hero and the villain.

The third act is composed of three frames; the first frame has five scenes, the second one has another five and the third one has three scenes. In this last act, the events that lead to the dramatic end of the play take place, resulting in the unusual victory of the villain.

Miguel Hernández used a very careful metric and rhyme, alternating different types of stanzas according to the character of the scene. Popular songs and verses appear together with other cultured ones: décimas, quintillas, quatrains, hexasyllabic and octosyllabic romances, seguidillas and pie quebrado couplets.

== Plot ==
=== Fist act ===
Encarnación is in love with her cousin Juan, but he does not know it and she does not dare to confess it to him. Juan notices that she is sad and insists that she tell him what is happening to her, but she refuses. Another of the young men, Tomaso, is in love with Encarnación.

In the meantime, several girls are gathered together celebrating the figure of Juan, of whom they are all in love. They also argue among themselves, trying to compete for Juan's attention. When Encarnación goes to the girls, they urge her to intercede for each of them, but she confesses that she also feels love for him, even though he is her cousin.

Blasa, Juan's mother, wants Encarnación to go to the village party to have fun. She confesses to her aunt the love she feels for Juan and, despite the pain she feels at the same time for not being able to be by his side, she prefers to live with that pain. Encarnación leaves and Antonina, Blasa's friend, appears to announce that Don Augusto, the owner of the whole village, is about to arrive. Don Augusto had never come to the village before so there is great strangeness about the reasons for his visit.

Don Augusto arrives with his daughter Isabel to stay at Blasa's house and is surprised that no one else has come to greet him. The new guests are haughty, authoritarian, and impatient all the time. When Encarnación appears, dressed up to attend the party, Don Augusto is captivated by her beauty.

At the party, the young men and women sing and dance to the music. When the music stops, each of the girls tries to get Juan to notice her. Alonso, in love with Luisa, one of the girls, complains that Juan receives all the attention and challenges Juan to see who can lift a big stone more times in the shortest time possible. The challenge takes place, Juan wins and Alonso leaves resentful.

Encarnación appears at the party and announces the arrival in the village of Don Augusto and his daughter. One of the farmers, Gabriel, explains the cruel ways of the owner of the village, which provokes Juan's anger, but Gabriel advises him to be prudent. They all prepare to vacate the square in case they might disturb the owner. When he and his daughter Isabel appear in the square, Juan confronts them. Suddenly, it is announced that a bull has escaped and is coming through the square. Everyone rushes away, except Encarnación, who remains in the square, while Juan has to defend Isabel from the bull.

=== Second act ===
Don Augusto has decided to increase the rent of the villagers, but Juan is unwilling to obey his orders because the land does not provide sufficient yield. During the harvest, the other young men advise him to not rebel, but he is still willing to fight the owner's tyranny. Alonso appears and expresses all the hatred he feels towards Juan. Both are about to fight with sickles, but the other young men prevent it.

In the house, Juan confesses to Encarnación that he has fallen in love with Isabel since he had to protect her from the bull. As Isabel passes by, Juan holds her back and reproaches her lack of attention. Isabel, proud, replies that she has no obligation for his efforts to protect her from the bull and shows her disdain for having to mingle with the villagers. Juan confesses to her that he is in love with her and she reacts by mocking him, remarking on the social differences between them and speculating that he is probably only after her fortune. Juan denies the latter and states his pride in being a farmer. When Isabel leaves, Encarnación tries to make Juan realize that he should not love Isabel, but he cannot get her out of his heart.

At the fountain, Blasa and Antonina tell each other their respective sorrows. Antonina has an alcoholic husband who does not attend to his family obligations. Blasa, on the other hand, has been suffering since the arrival of Don Augusto, who has increased the rents to the villagers, has a grudge against her son and is pursuing her niece. To make it worse, Juan, in love with the owner's daughter, is saddened and sorrowful. In addition, Alonso, full of resentment against Juan, continues picking a fight with him.

The young girls arrive at the fountain and each one contemplates her beauty as her image is reflected in the water. They come to the conclusion that they cannot lose their beauty by loving someone who does not love them, so they decide to forget about Juan and turn their attention to the other young men. Later, Tomaso confesses to Encarnación the love he feels for her, but she is sad and does not feel like listening to him at that moment. When Tomaso leaves, Don Augusto arrives and harasses Encarnación, but Juan appears to free her from him. Juan attacks and slaps Don Augusto. The latter announces that he is fired, to which Juan replies that he has no intention of leaving. Don Augusto threatens him by reiterating that, dead or alive, he will make him leave the village.

=== Third act ===
Juan feels dejected because Isabel despises him. It is discovered that someone has stolen wheat and Tomaso suspects Alonso, who has also allied with Don Augusto in his hatred against Juan. On the other hand, the girls seek the attention of the boys: Rafaela seeks Tomaso's love and informs him that Encarnación is in love with Juan. After speaking with Encarnación, Tomaso gives up his hopes for her.

Isabel tries to convince Juan not to be so haughty with her father: if he would treat him with respect, she would intercede so he would not be thrown out of the village. She goes as far as to offer him money, but Juan only cares that she accepts his love and refuses her money.

In the tavern, Juan reproaches his fellow villagers for not being willing to rebel together against the abusive actions of Don Augusto, but they do not want to address the matter out of fear of possible reprisals and seek comfort in wine.

Don Augusto and Alonso, full of hatred towards Juan, plan his murder. Juan goes to the threshing floor, where Alonso hides waiting for him. There, Encarnación finally confesses to Juan all her feelings for him. He is ashamed of having been blind for so long and is happy and willing to reciprocate his cousin's love. When they retire to sleep together in the threshing floor, Alonso comes out of hiding and attacks Juan with a sickle, killing him.

== Characters ==
=== Juan ===
From the beginning of the play, Juan stands out for his gallant personality, a characteristic that attracts his cousin Encarnación and the other girls of the village. However, he does not boast of the qualities which his friends and family so greatly praise. His temperament and firmness in difficult situations is evident in his confrontation with Don Augusto.

=== Encarnación ===
Encarnación is Juan's cousin and ally, who throughout the play comes to stand out even more than Juan in drama and lyric. She is the female protagonist, who both introduces and concludes the play. Her love for Juan is so intense that she comes to reject the love of Tomaso, an honest man, and the powerful Don Augusto, owner of her village.

=== Isabel ===
Isabel, daughter of Don Augusto, is one of Juan's opponents along with her father and Alonso. Juan tries hard to romance her, but she rejects him, because of her selfishness and disdain for those who are not of her own class. The only thing she is willing to do is to pay Juan to put aside his resentment towards her father.

=== Blasa ===
Blasa is a hard-working woman, who is very concerned about the village's drought problem and who gives her own merits of her peasant life to Don Augusto. She is also Juan's mother, from whom she tries to defend him from everything and everyone. But this affection borders on passion, as she claims to have come to look at him with the eyes of a lover. Both she and her friend Antonina are characterized by their mutual affection for Juan and their also mutual rebelliousness towards Don Augusto.

=== Antonina ===
Antonina represents several parallels with Blasa since she is the one who announces that don Augusto and his daughter are going to the village. Antonina is burdened by a drunken husband who does not work, Carmelo, and five children whom she cannot feed. She possesses a bravery that is evident when she confronts her husband, as well as showing a certain irony in the face of Don Augusto and Isabel. In addition, her defensive relationship with Juan is evident when she criticizes Alonso's behavior.

=== Don Augusto ===
Don Augusto, owner of the village, is the head of Juan's opponents. Their enmity is based on social reasons, hatred, and love issues (about Encarnación). The social reasons refer to his fear that the villagers would join Juan to rebel against him, which would mean the end of his tyrannical rule. In terms of hatred, Don Augusto cannot forgive the disrespect shown to him when Juan slaps him and disobeys him. These acts on Juan's part are what lead him to ally himself with Alonso.

In love matters, it is worth mentioning his romantic infatuation with Encarnación, knowing that she is in love with her cousin Juan. Although Don Augusto has plenty of possessions, she refuses him, which adds another motive to hate Juan.

=== Alonso ===
Alonso is a young peasant who has always envied Juan. On multiple occasions he tries to defeat him in public, but always unsuccessfully. His enmity, as well as that of Don Augusto, is composed of several reasons. Within the social reasons, we find that eliminating Juan would mean for Alonso to make a step above him, to get out of the shadow he casts on him with his continuous protagonism. The hatred that Alonso feels towards Juan is the reason that leads him to ally himself with Don Augusto to take revenge.

In love matters, Alonso is in love with Luisa, who is in love with Juan. Her rejection, for being in love with Juan, causes another wound to his honor, which increases his desire for revenge.

=== The choirs ===
==== Young women's choir ====
The women's choir is composed of all the women who claim to be in love with Juan, made up of Baltasara, Teresa, Luisa, and Rafaela. The girls always intervene chorally to praise Juan or to preach their love for him. However, Luisa and Rafaela play more important roles in the drama and stand out from the others.

==== Young men's choir ====
The choir of young men is made up of Lázaro, Lorenzo, Roque and Tomaso, who are the ones who admire and respect Juan, as well as being the ones who support him in things they would never dare to do. They complain about the hardness of their work and the increase of taxes imposed by the owner. While Juan worries about the hunger of the village, they just want to eat and drink in peace. Within this group, the figure of Tomaso stands out the most.

==== Peasant's choir ====
The choir of laborers is very similar to the choir of young men in their tendency to ignore the problems that affect the village. This group is made up of Carmelo, Gabriel and Quintín. The difference between the young men and the peasants is that the latter are older and, therefore, more experienced.

== Influences ==
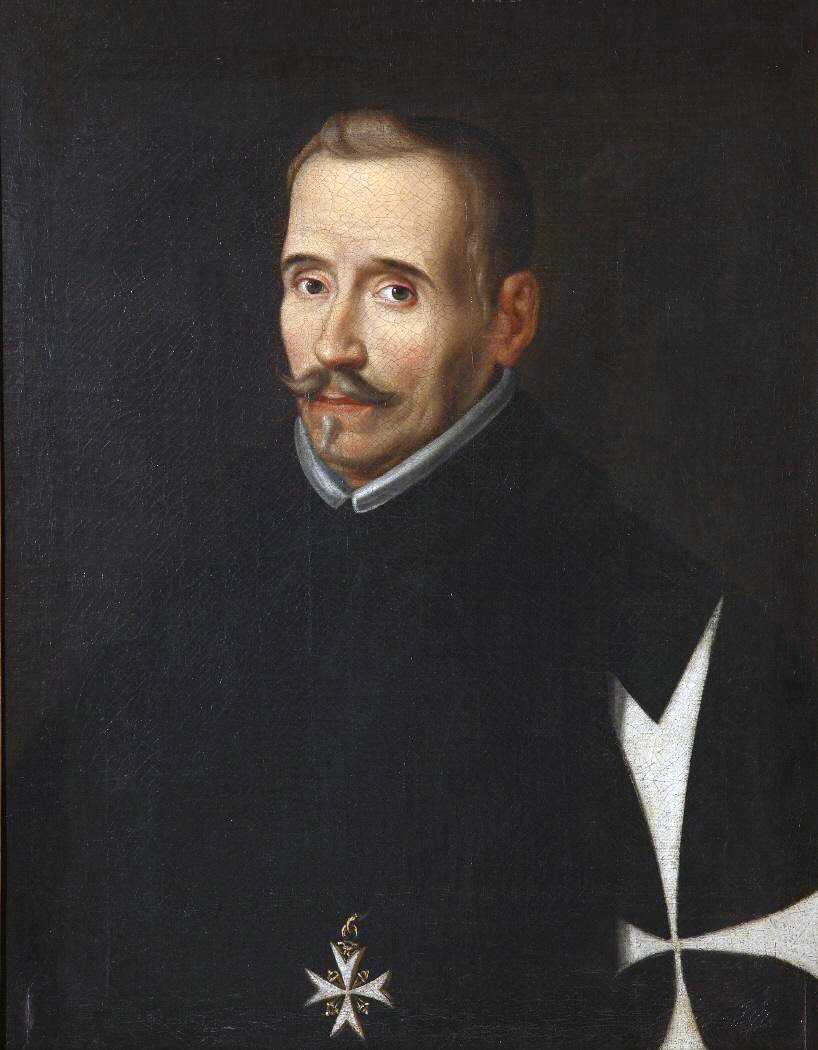
Lope de Vega, Spanish dramatist of the 17th century, a significant influence on Miguel Hernandez

This play is related to other works of the Spanish Golden Age, more specifically to the works of Lope de Vega, which depict the villain as someone who wishes to defend his honor against the attack of anyone, the rural and social dramas, and also the posture of dignity that is presented among the different characters of the village.

Lope's influence has been recalled many times for his poetic language and other concepts, although he is also influenced by Calderón de la Barca in a smaller extent. An example of Lope's influence is his play Fuenteovejuna, in which a similar case, if not the same, occurs as that of Don Augusto and Encarnación, where the lord of the village tries to take advantage of the peasant girl and her lover (Juan) prevents him from doing so.

But even so, there are differences between Lope de Vega and Miguel Hernández: for example, in Lope de Vega the normal order is restored to normal, while in Hernández's play it concludes with Encarnación's lament, which is very similar to Melibea's lament in La Celestina by Fernando de Rojas; moreover, there are also different intentions between them. Lope aims to entertain the public, not to discipline or moralize it.

However, based on the work in general, it is proven that Miguel Hernández's greatest influence was Lope de Vega, both in the work and in the influences of his youth during the poet's development. On the other hand, like the other members of the Generation of '27, Miguel Hernández was poetically attracted to Luis de Góngora, the main member of the Spanish culteranism of the 17th century.

== Criticism and reception ==
Although this play was described by several critics as Miguel Hernandez's most successful work, it is certain that it did not have a remarkable influence. One of the first received reviews was made by Ricardo Doménech in 1974; this means that in the thirty-five years following its publication, it did not stand out as other plays could have done. However, from the moment it was first performed, it has received several positive reviews such as that of Fernando Lázaro Carreter in 1977, when he said that the play was "the most direct theatrical drama of our contemporary theater". Agustín Sánchez Vidal, in 1992, stated that "although we can never speak of a work that is resounding... The Farmer with the Most Air had an undoubted literary value".

In spite of the fact that these illustrious figures have acclaimed the play, it cannot be stated that it had an undisputed success, since the author was better known among the public as a poet than as a dramatist, and so says Agustín Sánchez Vidal in another review he made of this play in 1976: "masterpiece (if not as theater, then as poetry)". Thus, the criticism that best describes the work is the one made by professor Díez de Revenga in 1997: "the culmination of a manner of making theater, tied to a certain literary tradition, but also presided over by the originality and the impulse of someone who was a brilliant poet and wanted to be a great dramatist".

== See also ==
- Spanish literature
- Generation of '27

== Bibliography ==
- Miguel Hernández. El labrador de más aire. Edition of Mariano de Paco and Francisco Javier Díez de Revenga. Madrid, Editorial: Cátedra, 1997. ISBN 84-376-1547-X
- José Luis Ferris. Miguel Hernández: Pasiones, cárcel y muerte de un poeta. Editorial: Temas de hoy, 2002.
- María Consuelo Franco Gútiez. Biografía lírica de una libertad cautiva: Miguel Hernández. Editorial: Albahaca Colección, 2006.
- Lengua y Literatura – 1ºBachillerato (Multiple authors). Editorial: Oxford Educación, 2008.

Preceded by Los hijos de la piedra 1935	Miguel Hernández; The Farmer with the Most Air; 1937	Succeeded by Teatro en la guerra 1937
