= Villacañas (surname) =

Villacañas is a surname. Notable people with the surname include:

- Beatriz Villacañas (born 1964), Spanish poet, essayist, and literary critic, daughter of Juan
- José Luis Villacañas (born 1955), Spanish political philosopher and historian
- Juan Antonio Villacañas (1922–2001), Spanish poet, essayist, and literary critic
