= Alfon =

Alfon is a surname. Notable people with the surname include:

- Dov Alfon (born 1961), Israeli journalist and editor
- Estrella Alfon (1917–1983), Filipino writer
- Fernando Alfón de Ovando, Spanish military and nobleman
- Juan Alfon, Spanish painter

== See also ==
- Alphons
- Alfonso González Martínez, Spanish footballer known as Alfon
