= Women's poetry in Spain =

Women’s poetry in Spain encompasses the poetic works written by women from the late medieval period to the present day. Long marginalized within the literary canon, women poets have contributed significantly to Spain’s cultural and intellectual history, often challenging dominant aesthetic, social, and political norms. From early courtly voices and Enlightenment authors to Romantic pioneers, avant-garde innovators, and post-dictatorship feminists, their work reflects both creative diversity and the ongoing struggle for recognition. Feminist scholarship and critical recovery projects since the late 20th century have been instrumental in restoring these voices to visibility within literary studies.

== Historical overview ==
=== Early Modern Period (15th–18th centuries) ===
The Querelle des femmes, a European debate on women’s intellectual capacity, influenced early Spanish feminist thought. Figures like Christine de Pizan inspired poets such as Florencia Pinar, Juana de Portugal, and Isabel de Villena (c. 1430–1490).

During the Enlightenment, the figure of the woman of letters emerged. Writers like Josefa de Amar y Borbón (Discurso en defensa del talento de las mujeres, 1786), María Rosa de Gálvez, and Margarita Hickey began challenging social and literary norms.

=== 19th century ===
The Romantic period saw a flourishing of women poets such as Josefa Massanés, Gertrudis Gómez de Avellaneda, Carolina Coronado, and Ángela Grassi. Writing often in periodicals, they addressed education, autonomy, and gendered constraints under the shadow of the "angel of the home" ideology.This era marked the beginning of a female literary consciousness, questioning the boundaries of authorship and reclaiming poetic identity.

=== 20th century: From avant-garde to post-war ===
Spain’s Silver Age (1915–1936) featured poets like Carmen de Burgos and Lucía Sánchez Saornil, and women associated with the Generation of '27: Ernestina de Champourcín, Concha Méndez, Elisabeth Mulder, and María Zambrano. Ernestina de Champourcín and Concha Méndez crafted poetic identities rooted in the body, desire, and agency, subverting canonical expectations. Their involvement in the Lyceum Club Femenino and their literary networks fostered creative freedom.

Anthologies during Franco’s regime, such as Cien años de poesía femenina (1943) and Poesía femenina española viviente (1954), began to recover suppressed voices, but often positioned them at the margins.

=== Democracy and Contemporary Era (Post-1975) ===
The advent of democracy ignited a “revolution” in women’s poetry. Beginning in the 1980s, poets including Blanca Andreu, Ana Rossetti, Juana Castro, Concha García, Amalia Bautista, Aurora Luque, Olvido García Valdés, and Ada Salas contributed to an outpouring of diverse and experimental poetic voices. Major anthologies —such as Las diosas blancas (1985), Ellas tienen la palabra (1997), Mujeres de carne y verso (2001), and En voz alta (2007)— helped cement the visibility of contemporary women poets. Authors born up to the 1980s were consolidated in José María Balcells’s Antología de poetas españolas, 1940–2002. However, reception has not always matched output; women poets were often excluded or minimized in literary criticism, histories, and national anthologies between 1990 and 2010 without a symbolic recognition through naming or citation. Now, their canon inclusion remains essential for legitimacy.

== Key critical perspectives ==
Feminist literary studies in Spain have addressed concepts such as gynocriticism, hermeneutics of suspicion, and the politics of canon formation. Scholars including José María Balcells, Laura Freixas, Pilar Nieva de la Paz, and Nuria Capdevila-Argüelles advocate a revised historiography attentive to systemic exclusion. Projects such as BIESES (Bibliography of Spanish Women Writers, 1400–1800) have catalogued more than 13,000 texts by female authors, offering new pathways for research and curricular inclusion.

== Bibliography ==
- Anderson, Andrew, De Paepe, Christian, Laget, Laurie-Anne, Martens, David, «Behind the scenes of Literature: the inner-workings of the Literary Society», Institut Universitaire de France (2019-2024).
- Balcells, José María. Antología de poetas españolas, 1940–2002. Hiperión, 2003.
- Baranda, Nieves & Cruz, Anne J. (eds.). The Routledge Research Companion to Early Modern Spanish Women Writers. Routledge, 2017.
- Dougherty, Dru, «Una poética del zigzagueo: Ernestina de Champourcín (1926-1936)», Hispania, 92, diciembre de 2009, pp. 653-663.
- Freixas, Laura. Literatura y mujeres. Ediciones Destino, 2000.
- Sasportes, Aurore. Palabras de carne in Del Vecchio & Rodríguez Lázaro (eds.), Voces y versos. IDEA, 2021.
- Wilcox, John C. (1994). “Ernestina de Champourcin and Concha Méndez: Their Rescission from the Generation of 27”. Siglo XX / 20th Century 12.1-2, 291-317.
