= José María Balcells Doménech =

Spanish philologist, literary critic and university professor

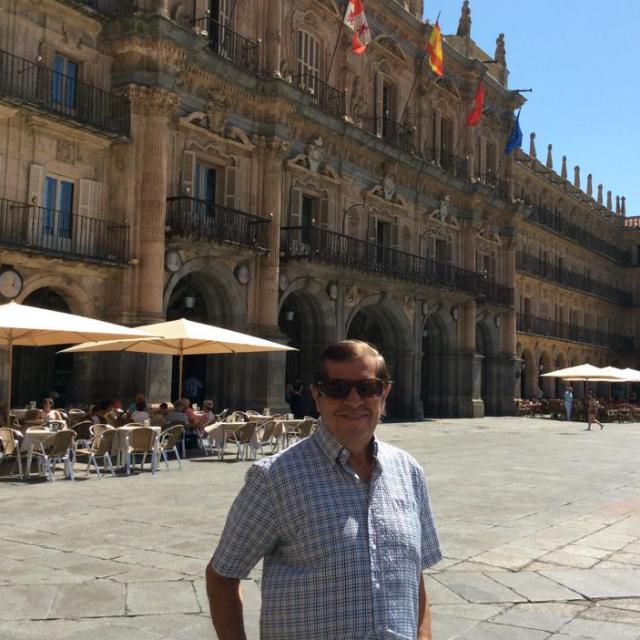
- José María Balcells Doménech
- Born: 5 March 1943 (age 83); Barcelona, Spain
- Education: PhD in Romance philology
- Alma mater: University of Barcelona
- Occupations: philologist, literary critic, professor, writer
- Employer: University of León (1993–2013)
- Notable work: "Miguel Hernández. Corazon desmesurado", Miguel Hernández: espejos americanos y poéticas taurinas, "Miguel Hernández y los poetas hispanoamericanos", "Tragedia en juego", La epopeya burlada, "Voces del margen".

José María Balcells Doménech (born March 5, 1943, in Barcelona) is a Spanish philologist, literary critic, and university professor, widely recognized for his work on 20th‑century Spanish literature. His research focuses on figures such as Miguel Hernández, Rafael Alberti, Ángel Crespo, as well as topics like the Spanish Golden Age and women's literature.

== Academic career ==
He began his working life as teacher in secondary education in Catalonia (1969–1985) during which time he took a doctorate (awarded 1979) at the University of Barcelona with a thesis Las ascéticas y morales de Quevedo supervised by José Manuel Blecua Teijeiro. He then worked as a researcher for the Commission for the Fifth Centenary of the Discovery of America under the Catalan government (1985–1986). He served as an associate professor at the University of Barcelona (1986–1991) and Rovira i Virgili University (1991–1992). In 1993, he became a full professor of Hispanic philology at the University of León, and directed the department of Hispanic and classical philology (2007–2013).

== Research ==
His dedication to the work of Miguel Hernández is noteworthy, contributing to his knowledge with editions and monographs. During his early youth, he met and interacted in Orihuela with people such as his widow Josefina Manresa, his brother Vicente Hernández, and other friends and acquaintances of the poet such as the lawyer José Martínez Arenas and the poet-baker, Carlos Fenoll. His biography Miguel Hernández, corazón desmesurado (1975) consolidated, along with other texts of the time, "the definitive affirmation of the figure and work" of the poet from Orihuela at the beginning of Spanish democracy.

He was responsible for one of the editions of Miguel Hernández's main work, El rayo que no cesa (2002), helping to bring his poetry closer to new audiences. likewise, he has analyzed his poetry in different books such as Miguel Hernández: espejos americanos y poéticas taurinas (2012), where he "explains new aspects of the poetry of the author from Orihuela.", Nacido (s) para el luto. Miguel Hernández y los toros (2017) or in Miguel Hernández y los poetas hispanoamericanos (2020), a book that "opens new paths in research" on Miguel Hernández. He has also compiled the spiritual poetry of the author from Orihuela in Asuntos del cielo: Antología de poesía religiosa de Miguel Hernández (2024),

He has made several important contributions to the study of women's writing and women’s poetry in Spain in works such as Voces del margen. Mujer y poesía en España. Siglo XX (2009) and, previously, in the anthology Ilimitada voz. Antología de poetas españolas. 1940-2002 (2003), a work that has contributed to the "consolidation of women authors born since the 1980s" because it "represents Balcells´s impressive efford to read, digest, and condense some seven hundred to eight hundred books of poetry and marks an important milestone in the history of studies of women´s writing."

Among his studies on the Spanish Golden Age are monographs and editions on Fray Luis de Granada and Francisco de Quevedo and in contemporary literature he has also conducted studies on the work of various 20th-century writers from different generations, mainly Ángel Crespo, José Corredor-Matheos, Rafael Ballesteros and Rafael Alberti, compiling his scattered poetry in Obras completas. Poesía IV (Seix Barral 2004).

He has written about Miguel de Unamuno in his book Tragedia en juego. Toros y tauromaquia en Miguel de Unamuno, where he explores "unamunian approaches to the world of bullfighting, expanding on them with quotations, anecdotes, and digressions."

José María Balcells Doménech has also focused on researching the various forms of the burlesque epic throughout Spanish literature, compiling his contributions in his 2016 monograph, La epopeya burlada. Del Libro de buen amor a Juan Goytisolo, hailed by the author as the "most comprehensive collection of studies on a neglected genre."

He has also carried out studies on medieval and 20th-century Catalan literature and has studied the Catalan influence in America in his book Revistes dels catalans a les Amériques (Generalitat de Catalunya, 1998).

He has lectured at the City University of New York, University of Ottawa, Sorbonne Nouvelle University, Seoul National University, Beijing University, National University of San Marcos in Lima, National Autonomous University of Mexico and Autonomous University of Santo Domingo and branches of the Instituto Cervantes.

== Other information ==
- Sr. Josep Maria Balcells - Elected National Corresponding Academicians No 39 of the Reial Acadèmia de Bones Lletres de Barcelona: 20 December 2001:
- Real Academia Alfonso X el Sabio
- Corresponding Academician of the North American Academy of the Spanish Language (ANLE)

== Selected publications ==
- Tragedia en juego. Toros y tauromaquia en Miguel de Unamuno (University of Jaén, 2022)ISBN 978-84-9159-475-8
- Miguel Hernández y los poetas hispanoamericanos (2020). Prólogo de Aitor L. Larrabide. Orihuela: Fundación Cultural Miguel Hernández, 2020. ISBN 978-84-948164-4-4
- Nacido (s) para el luto. Miguel Hernández y los toros (2017). ISBN 978-84-9159-081-1
- La epopeya burlada. Del 'Libro de buen Amor' a Juan Goytisolo. Prólogo de Juan Matas Caballero (University of León, 2016). ISBN 978-84-9773-756-2
- Miguel Hernández: espejos americanos y poéticas taurinas (2012). ISBN 978-84-92877-35-5
- Voces del margen. Mujer y poesía en España. Siglo XX' (University of León, 2009). ISBN 978-84-9773-484-4
- Rafael Alberti. Obras completas. Poesía IV. Ediciones críticas de José María Balcells. Barcelona: Seix Barral, 2004. ISBN 978-84-322-4055-3
- Ilimitada voz. Antología de poetas españolas. 1940-2002. Edición y estudio de José María Balcells., Universidad de Cádiz, 2003. ISBN 978-84-7786-800-2
- Hernández, Miguel. El rayo que no cesa. Edición de José Maria Balcells. 2002. ISBN 978-84-95498-51-9
- Miguel Hernández, corazón desmesurado. 1975. ISBN 978-84-7358-022-9
