= Quintilla (poetry) =

A quintilla is a Spanish stanza of five octosyllabic lines. It employs two rhymes and no three consecutive lines may rhyme nor may it end in a couplet. The most common scheme is abaab, but abbab, aabab, ababa and aabba are also permitted. It is similar to the four-line redondilla but is distinct from the quintilla real, which contains five hendecasyllabic lines.

Popular in the 15th century, as a standalone poem the quintilla only evolved in the 16th century from the separation of the parts of the nine- or ten-line copla de arte menor. It originally considered a type of redondilla. The forms that begin with a couplet (aabba and aabab) were not popular on their own but do appear as the second half of the copla real. The famous poem "Fiesta de toros en Madrid" by Nicolás Fernández de Moratín uses four of the possible forms.

== Example ==
Cancionero general, no. 481:

Cualquier prisión y dolor
que se sufra es justa cosa,
pues se sufre por amor
de la mayor y mejor
del mundo y la más hermosa
