= Barbara Henning =

American poet and fiction writer (born 1948)

- Born: October 26, 1948 (age 78); Detroit, Michigan, U.S.
- Education: East Detroit High School; Wayne State University (MA)
- Occupations: Poet; writer
- Writing career
- Genre: Fiction
- Website: barbarahenning.com

Barbara Henning (born October 26, 1948) is an American poet and fiction writer. She is the author of eight books of poetry, four novels and a series of photo-poem pamphlets. Her recent novelized biography of her mother, Ferne, a Detroit Story, was named by the Library of Michigan as a Notable Book of 2023. She is also the editor of a collection of interviews, [Looking Up Harryette Mullen: Sleeping with the Dictionary and Other Works] and The Selected Prose of Bobbie Louise Hawkins. Her work has been published in numerous journals. Some recent books of poetry and prose are Digigram (United Artists Books 2020); a novel, Just Like That (Spuyten Duyvil 2018); and a conceptual project, a collection of sonnets composed from 999 passages from 999 books in her collection, entitled My Autobiography (United Artists Books, 2007). Prompt Book: Experiments in Poetry and Fiction is forthcoming from Spuyten Duyvil 2020). Poets on the Road, a Blog, soon to be released by City Point Press, celebrates Henning and Maureen Owen's extensive reading road trip in 2018 across the USA.

== Background ==
Barbara Henning was born in Detroit, Michigan, and lives in Brooklyn. She is Professor Emerita from Long Island University in Brooklyn where she taught creative writing and literature. She has also taught for Naropa University, Wayne State University, Queens College, Writers.com and many workshops.

Henning grew up in working class suburb outside Detroit. She graduated from East Detroit High School and then from Wayne State University. After finishing her MA at WSU in 1984, she moved to NYC with her children and their father, Allen Saperstein.

In 1988, Lewis Warsh published her first book, Smoking in the Twilight Bar; the Twilight Bar was a neon sign that hung over the bar at Alvin's Finer, a deli, as well as a blues and rock club in the Cass Corridor of Detroit. See her photo-documentary Make Your Mama Proud. Here she tells the story of her relationship with Allen Saperstein and friends in the 1970s in Detroit's artistic Cass Corridor.

In 1992, she founded the literary magazine Downtown Brooklyn: A Journal of Writing, an English Department publication at Long Island University. From 1993-1995, Henning was the editor of Long News In the Short Century, a journal of art and writing. Sally Young and Miranda Maher were the Art Editors.

In 2003 Henning began composing, publishing and distributing to a list of poets, a limited artist's series of her photo-poem pamphlets under the imprint of Long News. They include My Animal Eyeball, The Dinner, Twelve Green Rooms, Twirling, the Spirit Flies Off Like a Falcon, Hari Om, Cities & Memory, An Arc Falling into the Bougainvillea, 7th Street, The Animal I Am, Aham Asmi Aham Asmi, Black Grapes, My Autobiography, Found in the Park, Up North, Aerial View. Many of these have been collected together in her Chax Press book, Cities and Memory and her Quale Press Book, A Swift Passage.

Besides writing poetry, novels and essays Henning has also edited three books: Selected Prose of Bobbie Louise Hawkins (BlazeVox Books, 2012); Looking Up Harryette Mullen: Interviews on Sleeping With the Dictionary and Other Works (Belladonna 2011); and Prompt Book: Experiments for Writing Fiction and Poetry (Spuyten Duyvil 2019).

== Other publications ==
=== Books of Poetry ===
- Digigram (United Artists Books, 2020)
- A Day Like Today (Negative Capability, 2015)
- A Swift Passage (Quale Press, 2013)
- Cities and Memory (Chax Press, 2010)
- My Autobiography (United Artists, 2007)
- Detective Sentences (Spuyten Duyvil, 2001)
- Love Makes Thinking Dark (United Artists, 1995)
- Smoking in the Twilight Bar (United Artists, 1988)

=== Novels ===
- Ferne, A Detroit Story (Spuyten Duyvil, 2022)
- Just Like That (Spuyten Duyvil, 2018)
- Thirty Miles to Rosebud (BlazeVOX, 2009)
- You, Me and the Insects (Spuyten Duyvil, 2005)
- Black Lace (Spuyten Duyvil, 2001)

=== Chapbooks ===
- Poets on the Road (with Maureen Owen, 2018)
- A Slow Curve (Monkey Puzzle Press, 2013)
- Me and My Dog (Poetry New York, 1999)
- In between (Spectacular Diseases, 2000)
- The Passion of Signs (Leave Books, 1994)
- Make Your Mama Proud

=== Artist book collaborations ===
- How to Read and Write in the Dark (with Miranda Maher, 1996)
- Words and Pictures (with Sally Young 1996).
