= Florencia Pinar =

Spanish poet

Florencia del Pinar
- Occupation: Writer
- Writing career
- Language: Castilian
- Period: 15th century

Florencia Pinar is one of the few named Castilian female writers of the 15th century. She is known mostly for her mastery of figurative language. Little is known about the exact date and location of her birth, but it is assumed that Pinar was an educated member of the upper class. This much can be deduced from the fact that she was one of the few female poets whose works were included in the 15th century Spanish poetic songbook known as Cancionero general. Her work must have been deemed exemplary at the time as the songbook was compiled with the intent to make the works of renowned poets more accessible to the public.

She also composed her poems in the Castilian dialect, which was characteristic of the educated upper class of her time. Only four of her works are known to have been published, two of which were later attributed to the "dama" (lady), or "Señora" Florencia Pinar. Both of these titles connote a certain elevated level of social status. There have also been a number of additional poems dating back to the 15th century that also denote a poet by the name of "Pinar." For the most part, many of these have been attributed to Florencia's brother Geronimo de Pinar - who was also a writer of many canciones. However, there is still some speculation about how many of them may have actually been written by Florencia Pinar herself. Pinar's poems are canciones - a popular 15th century - that usually discussed lighter themes.

== Works ==
Of the four works attributed to Pinar, "Canción de una dama que dice Florencia Pinar" (Song by a Dame Called Florencia Pinar), "Glosa de Florencia" (Florencia's Gloss), "Cancion de Florencia Pinar" (Song of Florencia Pinar), "and Otra canción de la misma señora a unas perdices que le enviaron vivas" (Another Song of the Same Lady About Some Partridges Sent to Her Alive), the latter is the most well known for its symbolism and hidden themes:

Florencia del Pinar original

Destas aves su nación
Es contar con alegría,
Y de vellas en prisión
Siento yo grave pasión,
Sin sentir nadie a mía.

Ellas lloran que se vieron
Sin temor de ser cativas,
Y a quien eran más esquivas
Esos mismos las prendier
Sus nombres mi vida son
Que va perdiendo alegría,
Y de vellas en prisión
Siento yo grave pasión,
Sin sentir nadie a mía.

Julie Allen translation

These birds were born
Singing for joy,
Such softness imprisoned
Gives me such sorrow---
Yet no one weeps for me.

They cry that they flew
Fearless of capture
And those whom shunned
Were those who seized them:
Their names write my life
Which goes on, losing joy;
Such softness imprisoned
Gives me such sorrow---
Yet no one weeps for me.

Samantha Pious translation

These birds were born to sing
with joy in flying free.
For them, encaged,
I ache with rage
but no one mourns for me.

They cry to find themselves enslaved
to masters whom they used to scorn.
The very men they hated most
can purchase them and take them home.
In their names I write my life,
which goes on losing liberty.
For them, encaged,
I ache with rage
but no one mourns for me.

It is in this work that Pinar shows her ability to play with language and create conceits (conceptismo), by showing love's dual role of providing both pleasure and pain. Also evident is her characteristic use of indirect sexual allusions. During this time period partridges served as an archetype of female promiscuity because female partridges are easily impregnated birds. This playful use of symbolism is one of the distinguishing features of Pinar's poetry. The prevailing theme of her poetry is love, but there is also much ambiguity in her tone. Throughout the centuries, scholars have often speculated about whether this love about which she so frequently writes is platonic or sexual in nature.

However, there is a very prominent discussion about Pinar's own feelings of entrapment within her poems. The encaged bird is clearly a reflection of Pinar herself as she chooses to twice repeat the lines "Yet no one weeps for me" even as she is reflecting on the partridge. This consistent repetition highlights not only her sadness and isolation, but also ensures that the reader returns to the idea that the bird is a metaphor for her own capture.

In her Cancione de Florencia Pinar, Pinar also delves into a discussion on love. She compares love to a worm that has burrowed its way into the body and likens love to a "cancer of nature who devours all the healthy flesh" (lines 7 - 8) right before harshly stating that "if he enters one's entrails he can leave only by tearing them out" (lines 11 – 12). These images are all very graphic, but allow the reader to clearly visualize her view on love. Her writing is clearly very evocative and fleshes out the painful paradox of love.

== Editions ==
"Canciones / Lieder." Bilingual Spanish-German edition. German translation by Anna Klinkner and Elena Moreno Sobrino. Saarbrücken: Calambac Publishing House (Calambac Verlag), 2020.

== Sources ==
- Kaplan, Gregory B. "Florencia del Pinar." Castilian Writers, 1400-1500. Dictionary of Literary Biography Vol. 286. Edited by Frank A. Domínguez and George Greenia. Detroit: Gale, 2004.
- Kaplan, Gregory. "Florencia Pinar." The feminist encyclopedia of Spanish literature. Westport, Conn.: Greenwood Press, 2002. 479 - 81. Print.
- Allen, Julie (translator). "Another Song of the Same Woman, to Some Partridges, Sent to Her Alive." in Barnstone, Willis, and Aliki Barnstone. A Book of Women Poets from Antiquity to Now. New York: Schocken Books, Inc, 1992. 256. Print.
- Pious, Samantha (translator). "Two Poems by Florencia Pinar in Translation." The Berkeley Poetry Review 46. 2016. Print. Online.
- Vollendorf, Lisa. Recovering Spain's feminist tradition. New York: Modern Language Association of America, 2001.
