= Miguel Hernández =

Spanish poet and playwright

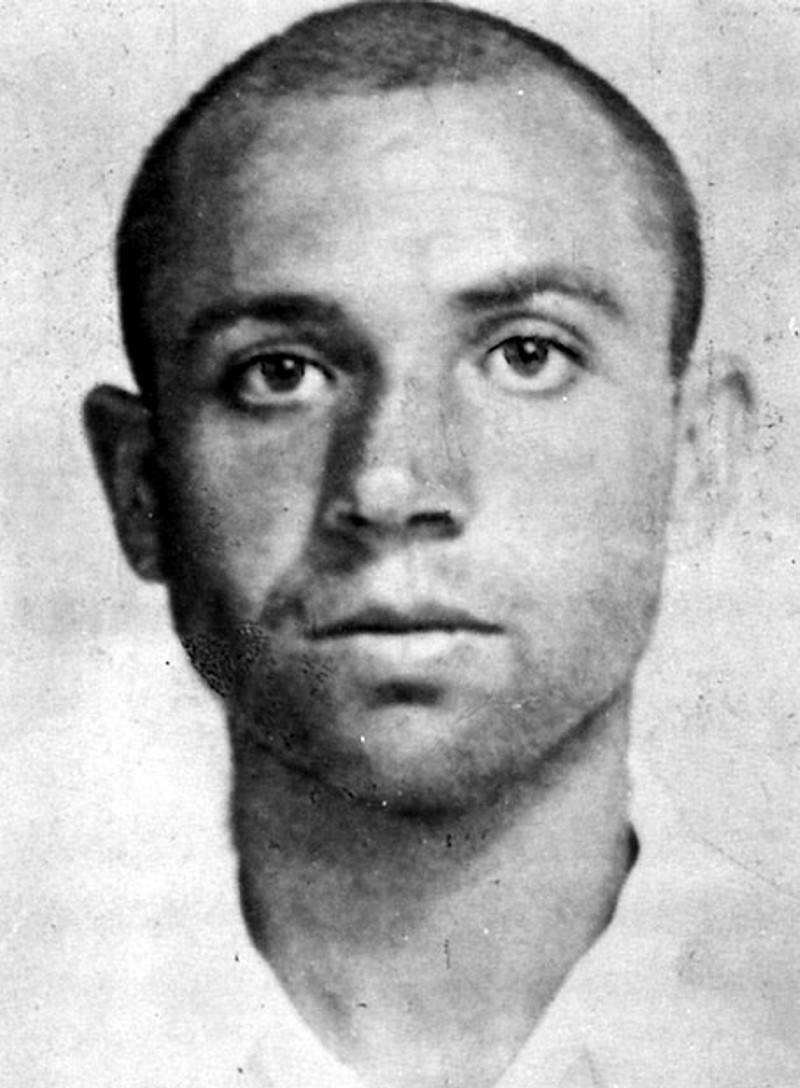
- Hernández in 1939
- Born: Miguel Hernández Gilabert; 30 October 1910; Orihuela, Spain
- Died: 28 March 1942 (aged 31); Alicante, Spain
- Occupations: Poet, playwright
- Spouse: Josefina Manresa (1916–1987)
- Children: Manuel Ramón (1937–1938); Manuel Miguel (1939–1984)
- Writing career
- Language: Spanish
- Genre: Poetry
- Notable works: El rayo que no cesa Viento del pueblo El hombre acecha Cancionero y romancero de ausencias
- Movements: Generation of '27; Generation of '36

Miguel Hernández Gilabert (30 October 1910 – 28 March 1942) was a 20th-century Spanish-language poet and playwright associated with the Generation of '27 and the Generation of '36 movements. Born and raised in a family of low resources, he was self-taught in what refers to literature, and struggled against an unfavourable environment to build up his intellectual education, such as a father who physically abused him for spending time with books instead of working, and who took him out of school as soon as he finished his primary education. At school, he became a friend of Ramón Sijé, a well-educated boy who lent and recommended books to Hernández, and whose death would inspire his most famous poem, Elegy.

Hernández died of tuberculosis, imprisoned due to his active participation on the Republican side of the civil war. His last book, Cancionero y romancero de ausencias, was published after his death, and is a collection of the poems he wrote in prison, some written in rudimentary pieces of toilet paper, others preserved in letters to his wife, is considered one of the finest pieces of Spanish poetry of the 20th century.

== Biography ==
Hernández was born in Orihuela, Alicante, to a poor family and received little formal education; he published his first book of poetry at 23, and gained considerable fame before his death. He spent his childhood as a goatherd and farmhand, and was, for the most part, self-taught, although he did receive basic education from state schools and the Jesuits. He was introduced to literature by friend Ramón Sijé. As a youth, Hernández greatly admired the Spanish Baroque lyric poet Luis de Góngora, who was an influence in his early works. Shaped by both Golden Age writers such as Francisco de Quevedo and, like many Spanish poets of his era, by European vanguard movements, notably by surrealism, he joined a generation of socially conscious Spanish authors concerned with workers rights. Though Hernández employed novel images and concepts in his verses, he never abandoned classical, popular rhythms and rhymes. A member of the Communist Party of Spain, Hernández was a member of the Fifth Regiment at the start of the Spanish Civil War and served in the 11th Division during the Battle of Teruel. He campaigned for the Republic during the war, writing poetry and addressing troops deployed to the front.

During the Civil War, on the 9 March 1937, he married Josefina Manresa Marhuenda, whom he had met in 1933 in Orihuela. His wife inspired him to write most of his romantic work. Their first son, Manuel Ramón, was born on 19 December 1937 but died in infancy on 19 October 1938. Months later came their second son, Manuel Miguel (4 January 1939 – 1984). Josefina died on 18 February 1987 at age 71 in Elche, Alicante.

Unlike others, he could not escape Spain after the Republican surrender and was arrested multiple times after the war for his anti-fascist sympathies. He was tried in 1939, along with Eduardo de Guzmán and 27 others, accused of being a communist commissar and of writing poems harmful to the Francoist cause. He was eventually sentenced to death. His death sentence, however, was commuted to a prison term of 30 years, leading to incarceration in multiple jails under extraordinarily harsh conditions. He suffered pneumonia in Palencia prison, bronchitis in Ocaña prison and eventually succumbed to typhus and tuberculosis in 1942 in Alicante gaol. Just before his death, Hernández scrawled his last verse on the wall of the hospital: Goodbye, brothers, comrades, friends: let me take my leave of the sun and the fields. Some of his verses were kept by his jailers.

While in prison, Hernández produced an extreme amount of poetry, much of it in the form of simple songs, which the poet collected in his papers and sent to his wife and others. These poems are now known as his Cancionero y romancero de ausencia (Songs and Ballads of Absence). In these works, the poet writes not only of the tragedy of the Spanish Civil War and his own incarceration, but also of the death of an infant son and the struggle of his wife and another son to survive in poverty. The intensity and simplicity of the poems, combined with the extraordinary situation of the poet, give them power.

Perhaps Hernández's best known poem is "Nanas de la cebolla" ("Onion Lullaby"), a reply in verse to a letter from his wife in which she informed him that she was surviving on bread and onions. In the poem, the poet envisions his son breastfeeding on his mother's onion blood (sangre de cebolla), and uses the child's laughter as a counterpoint to the mother's desperation. In this as in other poems, the poet turns his wife's body into a mythic symbol of desperation and hope, of regenerative power desperately needed in a broken Spain.

== Recovery and consecration ==
Truly, decade of the seventies marks the definitive affirmation of the figure and work of Hernández through titles like Cómo fue Miguel Hernández (Manuel Muñoz Hidalgo, Barcelona, Planeta, 1975), Miguel Hernández, corazón desmesurado (José María Balcells Doménech, Barcelona, Dirosa, 1975), Miguel Hernández, rayo que no cesa (María de Gracia Ifach, Barcelona, Plaza y Janés, 1975), Miguel Hernández, en la encrucijada (Agustín Sánchez Vidal, Madrid, Edicusa, 1976) and many others.

In 1980 Josefina Manresa's memoirs were published, Recuerdos de la viuda de Miguel Hernández (Madrid, Ed. de la Torre), and after Franco's death and the disappearance of Francoism, the definitive period of the poet's official consecration begins.

In July 2010 the poet's family filed a lawsuit in the Spanish Supreme Court in which they asked for his guilty verdict (for his supposed crime of left wing sympathies), to be annulled. In 1939 he had been condemned to death as "an extremely dangerous and despicable element to all good Spaniards." Franco later reduced the sentence so that he would not become an international martyr, as García Lorca did. In March 2010 the family had a posthumous "declaration of reparation" from the Spanish government, but, his daughter-in-law Lucía Izquierdo said: "We want something more, that they void the death sentence.. that they hand down a ruling of innocent". Lawyers for the poet's family had new evidence, a 1939 letter from a fascist military official, Juan Bellod, testifying to his innocence. "I have known Miguel Hernández since he was a boy", the letter began. "He is a person with an impeccable past, generous sentiments and deep religious and humanist training, but whose excessive sensitivity and poetic temperament have led him to act in accordance with the passion of the moment rather than calm, firm will. I fully guarantee his behaviour and his patriotic and religious fervour. I do not believe that he is, at heart, an enemy of our Glorious Movement".

== Works ==
The poet's works include:

=== Poetry ===
- Perito en lunas (Lunar expert, 1933)
- Imagen de tu huella (1934)
- El rayo que no cesa (Unceasing Lightning, 1936)
- Viento del pueblo (1937)
- El hombre acecha (1939)
- Cancionero y romancero de ausencias (incomplete, 1938–1942)
- El silbo vulnerado (The Injured Whistle, 1939)

=== Drama ===
- Quién te ha visto y quién te ve y sombra de lo que eras (If only they could see you now, and shadow of what you were, 1934), an auto sacramental that mimics Calderón ones.
- El torero más valiente (The Bravest Bullfighter, 1934) dedicated to Ignacio Sánchez Mejías, published in 1986.
- Hijos de la piedra (The sons of the stone, 1935)
- El labrador de más aire (The farmer of more air, 1937)
- Teatro en la guerra (War theatre, 1937)
- Pastor de la muerte (Death's shepherd, 1937)

=== Anthologies ===
- The Selected Poems of Miguel Hernández (2001), translated by Ted Genoways, Robert Bly, Philip Levine, Edwin Honig and others. ISBN 978-0226327730.

== Legacy ==
Miguel Hernández University of Elche, and Alicante-Elche Miguel Hernández Airport are named after him, as is the Madrid Metro station Miguel Hernández, which is decorated with his poetry.

In 2010, Spain's Ministry of Culture established the Miguel Hernández National Youth Poetry Award in his honor.

== See also ==
- Generation of '27
- Generation of '36
- Spanish poetry
- The farmer of more air
