= Fernando Jiménez de Gregorio =

Spanish archaeologist (1911–2012)

Fernando Jiménez de Gregorio (30 May 1911 – 23 July 2012) was a Spanish historian. He served as official cronista of the Province of Toledo.

== Biography ==
Fernando Jiménez de Gregorio was born in Belvís de la Jara, province of Toledo, on 30 May 1911. In 1927, he finished his secondary studies of Enseñanza Libre at the Instituto San Isidro in Madrid. He studied both Law and Philosophy and Letters at the Central University, earning a PhD in the latter specialty in 1933, by reading a dissertation titled La convocatoria de Cortes Constituyentes en 1810. Aportaciones documentales inéditas acerca del estado de la opinión española en punto a la reforma constitucional, directed by Pío Zabala. He participated in the so-called Crucero universitario por el Mediterráneo.

Before the Civil War, he worked as teacher in Plasencia (serving as director of the Instituto Placentino Elemental de Segunda Enseñanza "Gabriel y Galán"). He later worked as secondary teacher at the Instituto "Saavedra Fajardo" in Murcia in the 1940s, and was soon being appointed as lecturer at the University of Murcia. He returned to Toledo in the 1960s. He also worked in Madrid, where he was appointed as director of the Instituto Isabel la Católica in the 1976/1977 academic year. He died, age 101, on 23 July 2012, in Madrid.

He authored more than 50 monographies, including Mi posguerra, Memorias de un miliciano de la cultura en Aranjuez and La Sagra toledana. He also devoted many works to his native comarca of La Jara.

== Recognitions ==
- Hijo Adoptivo ('adoptive son') of Talavera de la Reina
- Numerary member of the Real Academia Alfonso X el Sabio (joined in 1957)
- Numerary member of the Real Academia de Bellas Artes y Ciencias Históricas de Toledo
- Numerary member of the Instituto de Estudios Madrileños
- Commander with Plaque of the Civil Order of Alfonso X the Wise
