= Beatriz Villacañas =

Spanish poet, essayist and literary critic

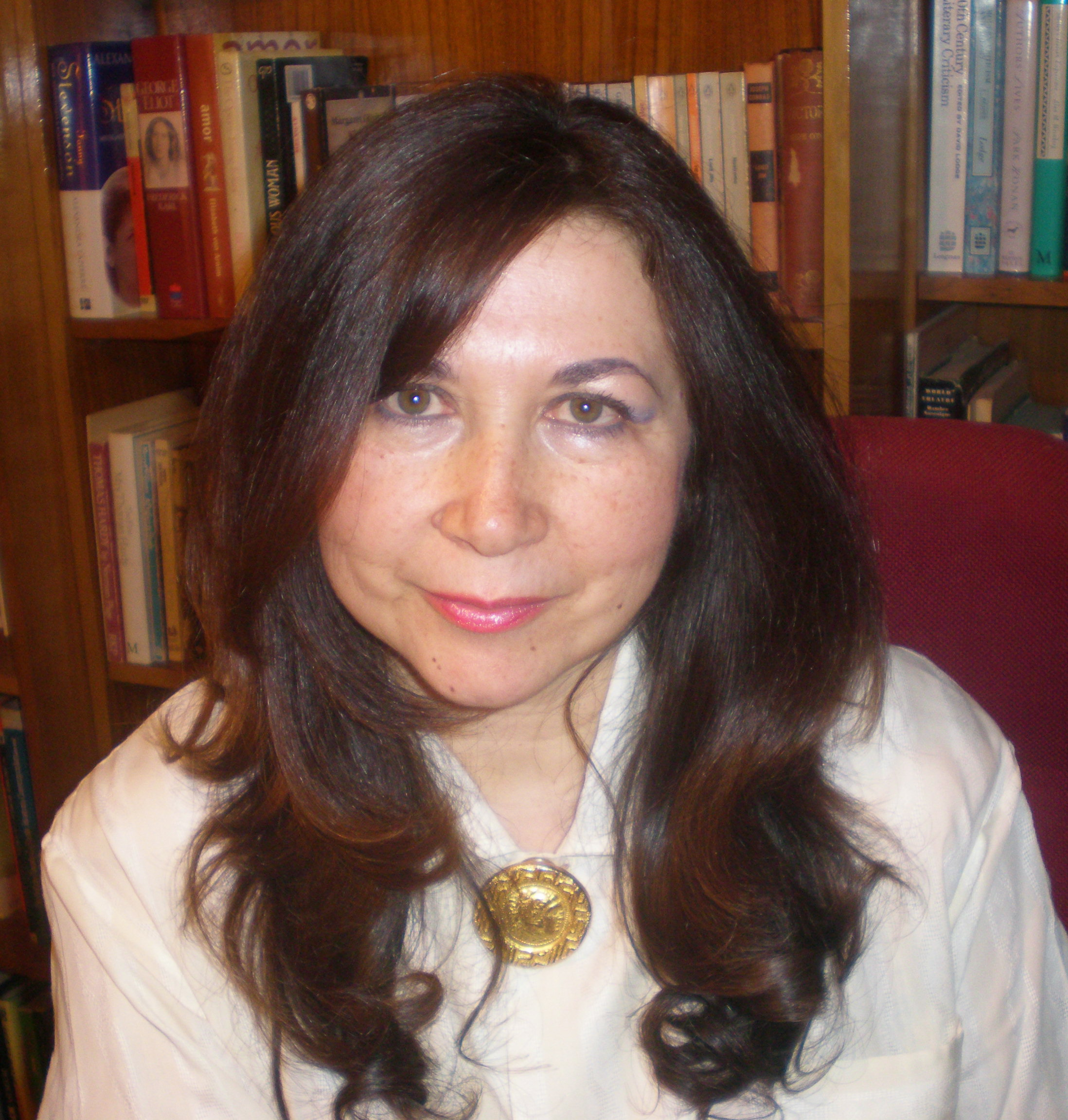
- Born: 1964 (age 61–62); Toledo, Spain
- Occupations: Poet, essayist, literary critic
- Writing career
- Genre: Poetry

Beatriz Villacañas (born 1964 in Toledo, Spain) is a poet, essayist and literary critic.

== Biography ==
Beatriz Villacañas was born in Toledo (Spain). She obtained her PhD in English Philology at Universidad Complutense de Madrid, where she is professor of English and Irish literature. Daughter of Juan Antonio Villacañas. Corresponding member of the Royal Academy of Fine Arts and History of Toledo. She has lived in the UK where she taught Spanish. She has translated English and Irish poets such as: W. Shakespeare, W. B. Yeats, Seamus Heaney, Michael Hartnett and Brendan Kennelly. Due to family and professional reasons, Ireland has long been her second country. Related to the latter are her numerous articles on Irish literature and Irish authors and her book Literatura Irlandesa, the first complete study on Irish Literature in the Spanish language. She has been invited to An Tobar (The Well): Meetings between Irish and Spanish poets (Madrid) and conferences on Irish-Spanish Relations throughout the Ages (Salamanca, Sevilla, Madrid). She was invited poet to Féile na Bealtaine, International Poetry Festival, Dingle, Ireland, 2007. . Together with the Irish poet and translator Michael Smith she has selected and translated poems by Juan Antonio Villacañas, Selected Poems, Shearsman Books.

== Work ==
Beatriz Villacañas's work comprises books of poetry, short stories, articles and essays. Lyrical reflection and probing into themes such as love, death, life and suffering are characteristic of Beatriz Villacañas' poetry, together with a marked preoccupation about transcendence and spiritual questions: "El tiempo nos esculpe y nos destruye, / la eternidad aguarda y nos rescata."("Time sculptures and destroys us/ Eternity awaits and rescues") "Tierra, voy a dormir contigo,/ si alguna vez despierto,/ compartiremos juntos/ la inmortalidad" (Earth, I am going to sleep with you/ If I wake up some day/ We will together share/ immortality" "Cada descubrimiento alimenta un enigma nuevo" ("Each discovery nourishes a new enigma") Critics have singled out the liric personality of her poetry as well as her mastery of poetic forms. Some examples: Antonio González-Guerrero wrote of Jazz: "In this world of poetry, where deceit and enmity often abound and where many are called but few chosen, such a personal and melodious voice as that of Beatriz Villacañas is a joy to the ear of the critic." On Dublín, José María Balcells wrote: "The book Dublín was awarded the prize of the I Bienal Internacional de Poesía Eugenio de Nora and this will come as no surprise to its readers since they will find the book a highly original creation both in so far as the rhymical techniques deployed as also in the tone and points of view presented". See also "El ángel y la física de Beatriz Villacañas". Diario Lanza (Ángel Las Navas Pagán) and "Venciendo la gravedad" (Carmelo López-Arias)

=== Poetic work ===
- Jazz, Esquío, La Coruña, 1991
- Allegra Byron, Editorial Zocodover, Toledo, 1993
- El Silencio está lleno de nombres(Silence is Full of Names), awarded Ciudad de Toledo Prize, Excmo. Ayuntamiento de Toledo, 1995
- Dublín, awarded Primera Bienal Internacional Eugenio de Nora Prize, Colección Provincia, León, 2001
- El Ángel y la Física(The Angel and Physics), Huerga y Fierro, Madrid, 2005
- Translation with Michael Smith: Juan Antonio Villacañas: Selected Poems, Bilingual edition Spanish/English. Shearsman Books, U.K., 2009
- La gravedad y la manzana (Gravity and the Apple), Devenir, Madrid, 2011

Testigos del asombro, Vitruvio, Madrid, 2014 • Testigos del asombro. Edición en México. Casa Maya de la poesía. Colección Rosa Náutica. Asociación Campechana del Haiku. Campeche, México, 2014

El tiempo del padre,(The time of the father). Colección Julio Nombela. Asociación de Escritores y Artistas Españoles, Madrid, 2016

Cartas a Angélica (Letters to Angélica) (Plaquette. Dedicated to the memory of Angélica González García, victim of the 11th March attack, who was a student of Beatriz Villacañas. Vitruvio, 2016.

• La voz que me despierta (The voice that wakes me up), Vitruvio, Madrid,2017.

Astrología interior. (Inner Astrology) Antología poética. Ediciones Deslinde. Madrid, 2019.

De la vida al verso. (From life to verse) Editorial Verbum. Madrid, 2020.

=== Academic books ===
- Los Personajes Femeninos en las Novelas de Thomas Hardy (Female Characters in Thomas Hardy's Novels), Universidad Complutense, Madrid, 1991.
- Mirando hacia la isla occidental: primera aproximación a la Literatura Irlandesa (Looking Towards the Western Island: First Approach to Irish Literature), Ediciones Blancas. Prometeo. Madrid, 2002
- La Poesía de Juan Antonio Villacañas: Argumento de una Biografía (The Poetry of Juan Antonio Villacañas: Theme of a Biography), Consejería de Cultura de Castilla-La Mancha, Toledo, 2003
- Literatura Irlandesa (Irish Literature), Editorial Síntesis, Madrid, 2007

=== Studies and anthologies ===
Beatriz Villacañas appears in the following:

- Cien Poetas de Castilla-La Mancha, ed. A.Villaverde (Guadalajara), 1986
- Poetas de Toledo, Manxa. Grupo Literario Guadiana. Director: Vicente Cano. Ciudad Real, 1991
- Datos para una Bibliografía Crítica de Poetas Toledanos Vivos, Joaquín Benito de Lucas (Universidad Autónoma, Madrid), 1993
- El papel de la literatura en el siglo XX, Fidel López-Criado. Universidad de la Coruña, 2001
- Mar Interior, poetas de Castilla-La Mancha, ed. Miguel Casado. Junta de Comunidades de Castilla-La Mancha, Toledo, 2002.
- Poetisas españolas: Antología general, ed. Luz María Jiménez Faro. Torremozas, Madrid, 1996–2002.
- Ilimitada Voz: Poetas Españolas del S. XX, 1940-2002. José María Balcells. Publicaciones de la Universidad de Cádiz, 2003
- Miniantología en honor de Concha Zardoya. Ayuntamiento de Majadahonda, 2004.
- Tejedores de Palabras, ed. Juan Ruiz de Torres. Prometeo, Madrid, 2005.
- Poesía Siglo XXI en Español, ed. Juan Ruiz de Torres. Prometeo, Madrid, 2005.
- Escritoras Españolas del Siglo XX, José María Balcells. Arbor-Ciencia, Pensamiento y Cultura. Septiembre-Octubre, 2006.
- La Voz y la Escritura, ed. Basilio Rodríguez Cañada. Sial- Contrapunto, Madrid, 2006.
- Escritoras y Pensadoras Europeas, Mercedes Arriaga Flórez et al. ArCiBel editores, 2007.
- Ciencia y Sugerencia, ed. Marcela Lieblich. Ediciones Sins Entido, Madrid, 2007.
- Al Filo del Gozo. Poesía erótica hispanoamericana escrita por mujeres, ed. Marisa Trejo Sirvent. Universidad de Chiapas, México, 2008.
- Historia poética de Nueva York en la España contemporánea. Julio Neira. Ediciones Cátedra. May, 2012.
- Geometría y angustia. Poetas españoles en Nueva York. Julio Neira.Vandalia. Fundación José Manuel Lara. November, 2012.

=== Literary journals ===
Poems by Beatriz Villacañas may be found in the following literary journals:

Spain:

- Cuadernos del Matemático
- Cuadernos de Poesía Nueva
- Manxa
- La Pájara Pinta
- Barcarola
- Álora, la bien cercada
- Nayagua
- Buxía
- La Sombra del Membrillo
- Hermes
- Mephisto
- Piedra del Molino
- Luces y Sombras
- Raíces de Papel
- Fábula
- Acantilados de Papel
- Revista Áurea de Poesía

Mexico:

- Norte
- Foja de Poesía/ Círculo de Poesía

Argentina:

- Proa
- Analecta Literaria

EEUU.

- Diario Las Américas (Miami, Florida)

== Bibliography ==
- Araguas, Vicente: "Dublín, Beatriz Villacañas", Revista Leer, Junio, 2002.
- Balcells, José María: "Beatriz Villacañas, Dublín", Estudios Humanísticos de Filología, Nº 24, Universidad de León, 2002.
- Balcells, José María: Ilimitada Voz: Antologia de Poetas Españolas, 1940-2002, Universidad de Cádiz, 2003.
- Benito de Lucas, Joaquín: "Poetas toledanos vivos: Beatriz Villacañas", El Mundo Comarcal, 1995.
- Benito de Lucas, Joaquín: "El Silencio y los Nombres de Beatriz Villacañas", El Mundo Comarcal.
- De Arco, Jorge: "La gravedad y la manzana", Andalucía Información.
- De Arco, Jorge: Juan Antonio Villacañas: Selected Poems, Piedra del Molino, Revista de Poesía. Nº 11, 2009.
- Díez Serrano, Isabel, sobre El Ángel y la Física. Oriflama, Revista de Creación Literaria. Nº 8. Año 5º, Junio 2006, Madrid.
- Fernández, José Francisco: Literatura Irlandesa, Irish Studies in Spain, 2007.
- González-Guerrero, Antonio: "Jazz, de Beatriz Villacañas, un soplo de frescura", El Día de Cuenca y de Toledo, 23-VI-1991.
- González-Guerrero, Antonio: "La Infancia y sus Archivos" (Sobre Allegra Byron), El Día, 27-X-1994.
- J.R.M.: Beatriz Villacañas. Dublín. ABC Cultural, 2001.
- Las Navas Pagán, Ángel: "Entrevista con Beatriz Villacañas". Diario de La Paz, Bolivia. 10 de Marzo, 2005.
- Las Navas Pagán, Ángel: "El ángel y la física de Beatriz Villacañas". Diario Lanza, 22 de Febrero de 2006.
- López-Arias, Carmelo: "Venciendo la gravedad. Cae una manzana del árbol y sólo un poema puede detenerla". El Semanal Digital
- López Rueda, José: "El Ángel y la Física", La Pájara Pinta, Número 22, Junio 2005.
- Mora Fandos, José Manuel: La gravedad y la manzana, de Beatriz Villacañas: cuatro notas de lectura. Mil lecturas, una vida
- Oteo, Aránzazu, sobre El Ángel y la Física, La Sombra del Membrillo, número 5. Diciembre, 2005, Madrid.
- Palomino, Ángel: "Beatriz Villacañas", ABC, 3/5/2003.
- Ruiz de Torres, Juan: Sobre El silencio está lleno de nombres, Carta de la Poesía, 1996.
- Sánchez Alonso, Fernando: "Beatriz Villacañas, Tensión e Intensidad", La Estafeta Literaria, VII Época, nº 2, 1998.
- Valls Oyarzun, Eduardo: Literatura Irlandesa, Estudios Ingleses de la Universidad Complutense. Vol. 15, 2007

=== On La poesía de Juan Antonio Villacañas: Argumento de una biografía ===
- Barrero, Hilario Revista Poética Almacén, 2003
- Las Navas Pagán, Ángel: La Poesía de Juan Antonio Villacañas, Argumento de una Biografía. Diario Lanza, Ciudad Real, 2006.
- Porta, Emilio: "Para el que conozca la obra de Juan Antonio Villacañas este libro es un compendio indispensable por la importancia del análisis. Para el que no la conozca, Argumento de una biografía es la mejor oportunidad para acercarse a un poeta que debería ser citado entre los más grandes de la Poesía de habla hispana." Mirador.
  - Revista de la Asociación de Escritores y Artistas Españoles. Número 8. Madrid, Marzo, 2004.
- Ruiz de Torres, Juan: "Hoy ya nadie me ve". Diario Las Américas, Miami.
