= Carlos Murciano =

Spanish author

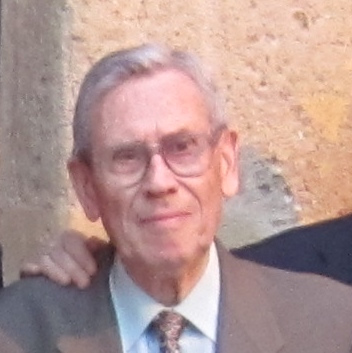
Carlos Murciano

Carlos Murciano (Arcos de la Frontera, 1931) is a Spanish poet and prose author, known as well as a musicologist, literary, and art critic.

== Awards ==
He has received several major literary prizes, such as the Spanish National Prize in Poetry (1970, Este claro silencio), or the Spanish National Prize in Children's Literature (1982, El mar sigue esperando), and runner-up to the 1954 Premio Adonáis de Poesía.
