= Petrus Petri =

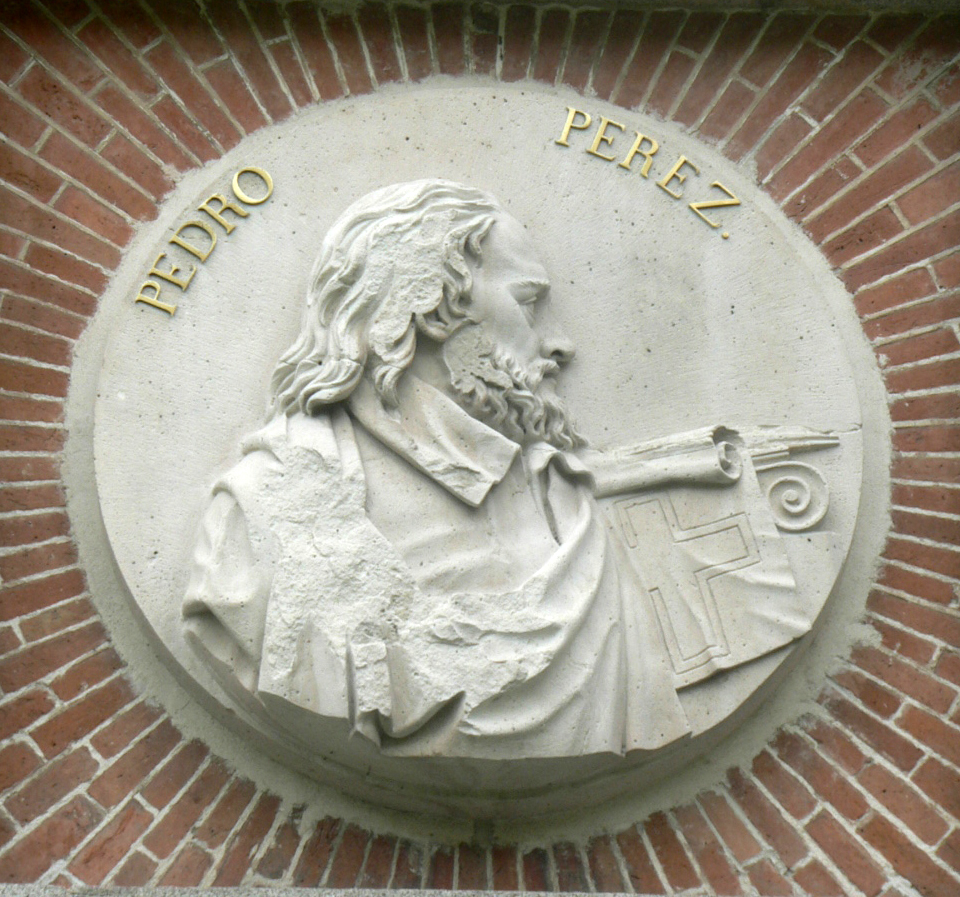
Petrus Petri (Pedro Pérez) in a medaillon in the facade of the Prado Museum.

Petrus Petri (also Pedro Pérez) (c. 1220 – 1291) was a thirteenth-century Spanish master architect. For centuries, it was held with complete certainty that he was the first master architect of the Cathedral of Toledo, based on the only existing testimony regarding the authorship, a legend inscribed in vulgar Latin still visible on a tombstone in the church

Petrus Petri, deceased in 1291, master of the church of Saint Mary of Toledo, whose fame was propagated by his good examples and customs, who constructed this temple and rests here, for what an admirable building he made, he will not feel the wrath of God.

Towards the middle of the 20th century, the bishop of Ciudad Real thoroughly investigated this claim and brought to light a series of documents which demonstrated the existence of a first master prior to Petrus Petri called Master Martín, married to María Gómez and certainly of French origin, who had been summoned by Ximénez de Rada. One of the documents is dated to 1227 and names "a master Martín of the work of Saint Mary of Toledo". Another document lists income collected by the cathedral in 1234 and records again the name of "Master Martín of the work", of whom it is also written that he was a tenant of a house associated with the cathedral. In later writings there appear the names of Martín (stonemason) and Juan Martín (master of stonemasons), who are believed to be relatives of each other. No new documents have appeared, so at present this master Martín is accredited as the first architect. To this argument it must be added that the date of the beginning of construction does not correlate with the age of Petrus Petri, who during those years must have been too young to be an architect.

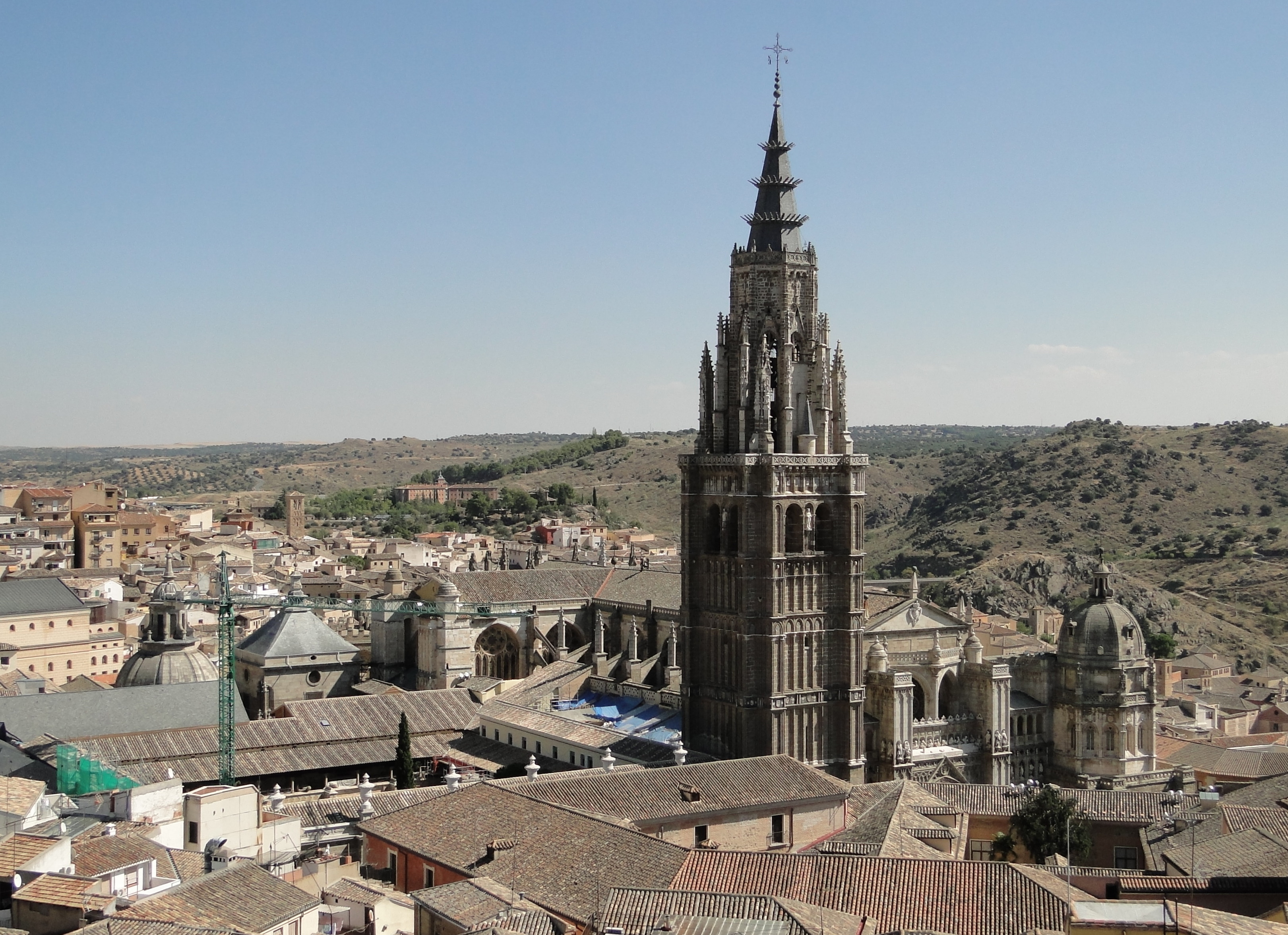
The Cathedral seen from the Church of San Ildefonso

Studies released after this discovery indicate that the master Martín would be the designer of the chapels of the ambulatory, and upon his departure by death or by absence, the supervision of the work was taken up by master Petrus, who finished the ambulatories and constructed the triforia in Toledan style. Towards the end of the 20th century, the sanctuary and two sections of the naves of the south side were completed.

It is known that Petrus Petri also worked on the Old Cathedral of Salamanca, discussed in the Archives of the Cathedral of that city, where he also worked with Florín de Pituenga, Casandro Romano, Alvar García, Pedro de la Obra, Juan el Pedrero, Sancho Pedro and Juan Franco.
