= Gustavo Morales =

Spanish journalist (born 1959)

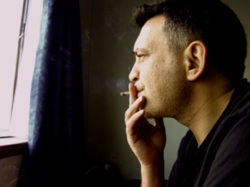
Gustavo Morales Delgado being interviewed

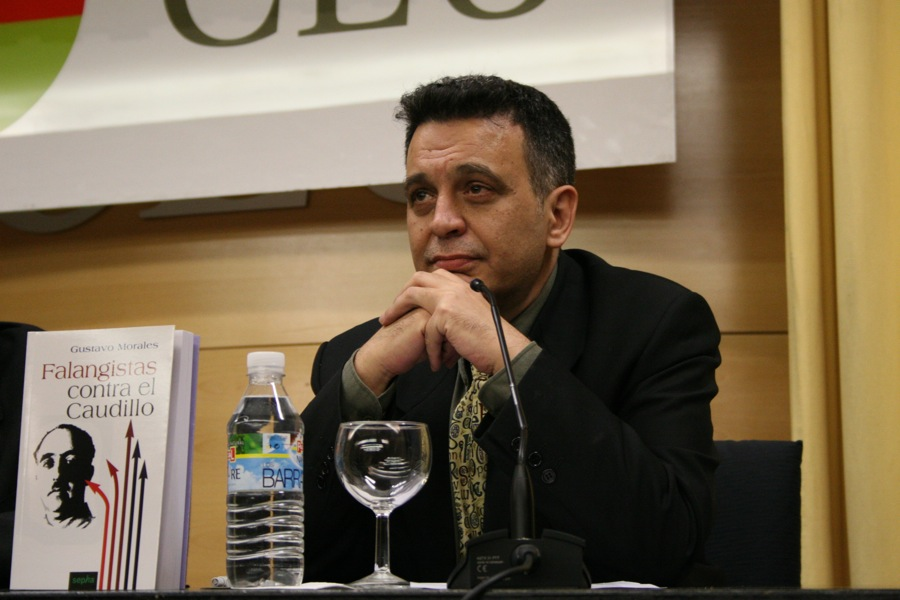
Delgado at a presentation of one of his books

Gustavo Morales y Delgado (born 27 March 1959 in Toledo, Spain) is a Spanish journalist, periodist and former politician. He is the former deputy director of the newspaper El Rotativo and former editor of the newspaper Ya. He has collaborated as a military analyst with BBC and Russia Today. He won the Carlos V Award for Journalism, two orders of Merit and Palma de Plata.

== Biography ==
Gustavo Morales grew up between Toledo, Spain and the Madrid neighbourhood of Carabanchel.

At the age of eighteen, Morales began to travel the world. In his travels he visited especially the Muslim countries, where his interest in the Islamic world was born. He has travelled throughout Europe, Tunisia, Jordan, Egypt, Iraq, Iran, Afghanistan, China, Nepal, India, and Japan. He has collaborated in the translation of different works of scholars from the Islamic world, such as The Rights of Women in Islam of Ayatollah Motahari, The Islamic Government of Khomeini, The Sociology of Islam of Shariati and the Iranian Constitution of 1979. He has written articles on the subjects and given some lectures thereon. His university education took him to the faculties of History, Sociology and to Information Science, where he specialised. He wrote about the Iranian-Iraqi war, living in Al Amarah (Maysan) and Baghdad in 1982. He was an observer of the cease-fire in Iran. He has written two books on Islamic fundamentalism published in 1988, Imam Khomeini's Iran, and in 1990, Iran in the World. He was editor-in-chief of the magazine MC, directed the newspaper Ya and the program The Quadrilateral on Channel 7 TV. He was also editor-in-chief and deputy editor of the magazine Defensa, founded by Arturo Pérez-Reverte and Vicente Talón Ortiz. Before his travels he enlisted in the Legion.

He was assistant director of El Rotativo, at CEU San Pablo University, was attached to the director of the magazine War Heat, and director of the online university newspaper ElRotativo.org. He has been a military analyst for the BBC since 2003. He has been a contributor to Legio XXI (Voluntary Reserve magazine), European Dialogue and El Semanal Digital. He collaborated on the radio programs of Intercontinental La Gran Esperanza, and Punto de Vista. He was also a sporadic member of the show El Gato al Agua on the television channel Intereconomía. He is currently directing the Orientando en HispanTV program.

He has twice been sent to the Republic of Kazakhstan.

== Falangist Period ==
At the age of fourteen, he entered the illegal Front of Student Unionists – one of the groups that gave rise to the FE de las JONS (Authentic) – being responsible for Teaching Media in Madrid. He was local chief of the Junta de Carabanchel, Milicias squadron chief and youth secretary. He attended the World Congress of Students in Cuba, in a blue shirt in 1978. He held the position of national head of FE de las JONS from 1995 to October 1997, when he resigned by offering a table for the unit at a public event in the Plaza de Olavide.

In 1997 he founded the José Antonio Primo de Rivera Foundation. In 1999, together with Ángel Carrera Zabaleta and Luis Manuel Rodríguez Jamet, he founded the Ramiro Ledesma Ramos Foundation, of which he was president. The last century abandoned political party militancy.

=== Bibliography ===
- Morales, Gustavo (1988). El Irán del imam Jomeini. Madrid: Biblioteca universitaria. ISBN 84-86568-18-8.
- Morales, Gustavo (1990). Irán en el mundo: apuntes para una historia internacional del estado iraní. Madrid: Biblioteca universitaria. ISBN 84-86568-33-1.
- Morales, Gustavo (1996). De la protesta a la propuesta. La alternativa falangista. Madrid: Ediciones barbarroja. ISBN 978-84-87446-15-3.
- Morales, Gustavo y otros (2002). Revisión de la guerra civil española. Madrid: Editorial Actas. ISBN 84-9739-000-8.
- Velarde, Juan (Coord.) (2004). José Antonio y la Economía. Madrid: Grafite. ISBN 84-96281-10-8.
- Morales, Gustavo (2004). Fascismo en España: Claves del desarrollo nacionalsindicalista en la primera mitad del siglo XX. Oviedo: El Catoblepas. ISSN 1579-3974.
- Morales, Gustavo (2007). Falangistas contra el Caudillo. Madrid: Sepha. ISBN 978-84-96764-16-3.
- Morales, Gustavo y Togores, Luis (2008). La División Azul. Las fotografías de una historia. Madrid: La esfera de los libros. ISBN 978-84-9734-776-1.
- Morales, Gustavo et al. (Universidad San Pablo-CEU) (2008). La República y la guerra civil setenta años después. Madrid: Editorial Actas. ISBN 978-84-9739-069-9.
- Morales, Gustavo y otros (2009). Los derechos humanos sesenta años después. Valladolid: Universidad de Valladolid. ISBN 978-84-8448-519-3.
- Morales, Gustavo (2009). Etiopía frente an Eritrea, guerra en el cuerno de África. Revista Ejército de Tierra Español. ISSN 1696-7178.
- Morales, Gustavo y Togores, Luis (2010). Falangistas. Madrid: La esfera de los libros. ISBN 978-84-9321-034-2.
- Morales, Gustavo, José J. Esparza y otros (2011). El libro negro de la izquierda española. Barcelona: Chronica. ISBN 978-84-15122-43-2.
- Morales, Gustavo and others (2014). Un grito en el silencio: homenaje de Mercedes Fórmica. Madrid: Ediciones Barbarroja. ISBN 978-84-87446-91-7.
- Morales, Gustavo (2014). Manual para rebeldes. Tarragona: Fides. ISBN 84-943269-0-2.
- Morales, Gustavo (2016). Forward to Gerardo Salvador Merino. Tarragona: Fides. ISBN 978-84-944917-7-1.
- Morales, Gustavo (2017). Forward to El aliado persa. Segovia: Mandala. ISBN 978-84-16765-70-6.
