= Rafael Morales (poet) =

Spanish poet (1919-2005)

Rafael Morales Casas
- Born: July 31, 1919; Talavera de la Reina, Toledo, Spain
- Died: June 29, 2005 (aged 85); Madrid, Spain
- Occupation: Poet
- Notable work: Poemas del toro (1943)
- Awards: Premio Nacional de Literatura (1954)

Rafael Morales Casas (31 July 1919 - 29 June 2005) was a Spanish poet.

He was a prominent poet in Spain. He is thought of as "One of the most often read and reprinted Spanish poets of the twentieth century."

He was born in Talavera de la Reina in the province of Toledo, and studied in Madrid and Coimbra. Among his best-known work is the 1943 collection Poemas del toro, his first book of poetry, which he said made his prestige "great and sudden," respected by poet Vicente Aleixandre of Spain, who won the Nobel Prize.

He was a professor at the University of Madrid.

== Works ==
- Poemas del toro, M., Col. Adonais, 1943.
- El corazón y la tierra, Valladolid, Halcón, 1946.
- Los desterrados, M., Col. Adonais, 1947.
- Poemas del toro y otros versos, M., Afrodisio Aguado, 1949 (Prólogo de José María de Cossío).
- Canción sobre el asfalto, M., Los Poetas, 1954 (Premio Nacional de Literatura).
- Antología y pequeña historia de mis versos, M., Escelicer, 1958.
- La máscara y los dientes, M., Prensa Española, 1962.
- Poesías completas, M., Giner, 1967.
- La rueda y el viento, Salamanca, Álamo, 1971.
- Obra poética (1943-1981), M., Espasa-Calpe, 1982 (Con el libro inédito Prado de Serpientes. Prólogo de Claudio Rodríguez).
- Entre tantos adioses, Melilla, Rusadir, 1993.
- Obra poética completa (1943-1999), M., Calambur, 1999.
- Poemas de la luz y la palabra (2003).
