= Real Academia Alfonso X el Sabio =

Cultural institution in Murcia, Spain

- Real Academia Alfonso X el Sabio
- Formation: 1940
- Type: Governmental
- Legal status: Organization
- Official language: Spanish

Real Academia Alfonso X el Sabio or Royal Academy Alfonso X the Wise is a public law corporation founded in 1940 by the Region of Murcia (Spain), with the aim of developing research in all areas of knowledge, especially in relation to Murcian regional culture.

== History ==
The Alfonso X el Sabio Royal Academy was founded on November 19, 1940, following a proposal from Luis Carrasco Gómez, president of the Murcia Provincial Council, who presented to the deputies an idea based on a previous one by José Ibáñez Marín, who had already proposed the founding of the academy in February 1930, when it was agreed, an agreement that was forgotten by the vicissitudes of the Second Spanish Republic and, above all, of the Spanish civil war.

On April 12, 1941 the solemn act of its constitution and initiation of activities took place, an act presided over by the then Minister of Education José Ibáñez Martín. The Academy functioned under the tutelage of the Provincial Council until 1982, being managed since then by the Governing Council of the Region of Murcia. The Academy has been attached, since its foundation, to the Spanish National Research Council and is part of the Spanish Confederation of Local Study Centers and the Institute of Spain.

== Notable people ==
- Jean Canavaggio
- Pedro Flores Garcia
- Fernando Jiménez de Gregorio
- Jose Maria Jover Zamora
