= Tomás Barros Pardo =

Spanish painter and author

Tomás Barros Pardo (Toledo, 1922 – La Coruña, 1986) was a Spanish painter and author.

Painter, poet, composer, author of plays, essays and one novel, occasional reporter, PhD in Fine Arts, and member of the Royal Galician Academy, Tomás Barros was one of the most prolific intellectuals among the Galician writers that stayed in Francoist Spain. As with many of this group of non-exiled artists and intellectuals, he shared concerns and collaborations with the exiled ones, as would be the case with Luis Seoane, Rafael Dieste, Vicente Aleixandre, Celso Emilio Ferreiro and his cousin Isaac Díaz Pardo

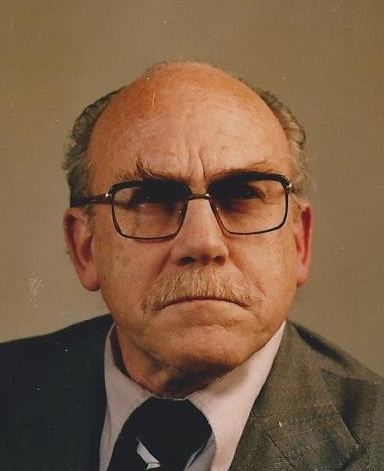
Tomás Barros Pardo, Galician painter and writer.

== Biography ==
Accidentally born in Toledo in 1922, his family returned in 1929 to their city of origin, Ferrol, where he would spend his childhood and early youth. After graduating in Education in Santiago de Compostela, he moved to Madrid to graduate in fine arts at the Real Academia de Bellas Artes de San Fernando. For over 30 years he worked as a professor in technical drawing and plastic expression in A Coruña, where he combined it with artistic creation until his death.

His literary activity developed from the early 1950s, with his first published work, "Gárgolas", in 1950, and the foundation in 1952 of the poetry and literary magazine Aturuxo, along with Mario Couceiro and Miguel C. Vidal. In the 1950s, Barros published several poetic works and drama plays, as well as shorter essays and articles in newspapers and magazines. In 1975 he founded with Luz Pozo Garza the poetry magazine Nordés, and in 1973 was awarded with the International Poetry Award of the Circle Latin American Writers and Poets (CEPI) of New York. Until his death in 1986, his literary production included several theater plays and many newspaper and magazine collaborations.

His plastic production, increasingly abstract from the 1960s, is characterized by a concern with "rhythm, color and shape", as Barros himself developed in many of his artistic essays.

== Selected published works ==
=== Poetry in Galician language ===
- Berro diante da morte, 1963
- Abraio, 1978
- Vieiro de señardade, 1987

=== Poetry in Spanish language ===
- Gárgola, 1950
- La estrella y el cocodrilo, 1957
- El helecho en el tejado, 1957
- A imagen y semejanza, 1973
- Los ojos de la colina, 1973

=== Theater plays ===
- A casa abandoada, 1985
- Fausto, Margarida e Aqueloutro, 1993
- Panteón familiar, 1956
- Tres pezas de teatro, 1981

=== Novel ===
- El Rastro Invisible, 1990, Edicións do Castro (novela)

=== Essay ===
- Los procesos abstractivos del arte contemporáneo, 1965
- Sobre el origen de la corteza en los astros, 1973

== Bibliography in English ==
- IRIZARRY, Estelle, in "Writer-Painters of 20th Century Spain", 2010
- McDERMID, Paul: Tomás Barros and his Faust: Love, Mystery and Synchronicity, en Galicia 21, 2011
