= Hilario Barrero =

Spanish writer, translator, professor and poet

- Born: 1948 (age 77–78); Toledo, Castile-La Mancha, Spain
- Education: Philosophy
- Occupations: Writer, translator, professor and poet
- Writing career
- Period: 1976–present
- Genre: Poetry
- Website: mysite.verizon.net/hilariobarrero (In Spanish)

Hilario Barrero (born 1948) is a Spanish writer, translator, professor and poet. He also is a columnist with Fifth Column in The New York Times.

== Biography ==
He was born in Toledo, Castile-La Mancha, Spain, in 1948, and he had 7 sibling. In 1976 Barrero published his first book: Siete sonetos (Seven Sonnets). In 1978, Barrero left Spain and settled in New York City "to work on poetry". He holds a PhD in philosophy from the University of New York City. He is professor of Spanish at Princeton University. He is currently professor of Spanish at the University of New York City (Borough of Manhattan Community College).

Barrero was Premio Adonáis de Poesía finalist in 1967 and won several literary prizes. Has translated into Spanish several contemporary American poets, including Robert Frost, Donald Hall and Jane Kenyon. He also won the I International Poetry Prize Gastón Baquero for his work In tempore belli on 7 May 1998 and the poetry prize Muskiz lewd Café 2003 with the book The Rockefeller Center elevator.

His awards include also the Feliks Gross Endowment Award, given by the CUNY Academy for the Humanities and Sciences (the award honors emerging scholars for their research and scholarly achievements). His work has appeared in magazines in the United States and Spain, and been collected in several anthologies.

Some of his poems have been translated into English by Gary Racz and published in the journal Downtown Brooklyn Long Island University. He has collaborated, among others, in the following magazines: Aldonza, Clarín, calendering, The height, Grama, Propeller, Hermes, Humerus Bone, Manx, Spanish poetry, Hourglass, Revistatlántica and Turia. Late, came to BMCC in 2003 after teaching at Princeton University. Since October 2004 to July 2006, Barrero wrote a personal page called De Cuerpo entero the 7th day of each month. He write a column in the New York Times since July 2006.

In 2007 he began to publish El Diario de Brooklyn (in English: The Dailies of Brooklyn), a book of poetry that speaks about the life of New York and its features (people, scenes, etc.), especially the culture.

== Works ==
The books that he published are:

=== Books of poetry ===
- Siete sonetos (Seven Sonnets), 1976
- In tempori belli, Verbum (In tempori belli, Verbum), 1999.
- Agua y Humo (Cuadernos de humo)(in Spanish: Walter and smoke), 2010
- Lengua de Madera: Antología de poesía breve solo en inglés (Language of Wood: History of brief poetry in English only), 2011.
- Libro de Familia (Family book), 2012

=== Diaries ===
- Las estaciones del día, Llibros del Pexe (Of loves and fears, Book of the Pexe), 2005.
- De amores y temores, Llibros del Pexe (Of loves and fears, Book of the Pexe), 2005.
- El Diario de Brooklyn: Días de Brooklyn, Llibros del Pexe (Brooklyn Days, Book of the Pexe), 2007.
- El Diario de Brooklyn, 2006 – 2007: Dirección Brooklyn, Universos (Address Brooklyn, Universes), 2009.
- El Diario de Brooklyn, 2008 – 2009: Brooklyn en blanco y negro (Brooklyn in White and Black), 2011.

=== Tales ===
- Un cierto olor a azufre, Libro de notas (A smell of sulfur, Book Notes), 2009.

=== Translations ===
- De otra manera (Pre-textos)(By other way), 2007
- Delicias y sombras (Pre-textos) (Delights and Shadows), 2009
- El amante de Italia (Grand Tour) (The lover of Italy), 2009

=== Anthologies ===
- Miradas de Nueva York. (Mapa poético) (Views of New York. (Map poetic)), (2000).
- Timor: Do Poder das Armas a Força do Amor, 2002
- Líneas urbanas. Lectura de Nueva York (Urban lines. Reading New York), 2002
- Piel-palabra (Muestra de la poesía española en Nueva York) (Skin-word (Sample of Spanish poetry in New York)), 2003
- Aquí me tocó escribir (Here I had to write), 2004
- Alfileres, El haiku en la poesía española última (Pins, The haiku in the Spanish poetry last), 2004
- Escritores españoles en América (Spanish Writers in America), 2007
- El laberinto de Ariadna, 10 años de poesía (The Labyrinth of Ariadne, 10 years of poetry), 2008
- Luz ilesa. Cuatro poetas-profesores, Valdediós (Light unharmed. Four poets, teachers, Valdediós), 2008
- Cuentos para Toledo, Cylea Ediciones (Stories for Toledo, Cylea Editions), 2009
- Erato bajo la piel del deseo (Antología de poesía erótica) (Erato under the skin of desire (erotic poetry anthology)), 2010
- Ventanas sobre el Atlántico: Estados Unidos-España durante el Postfranquismo (1975–2008) (Windows on the Atlantic: United States-Spain during the post-Franco (1975–2008)), 2011
- Historia Poética de Nueva York en la España Contemporánea (Poetic History of New York in Contemporary Spain) (Cátedra), 2012

=== Magazines ===
He works in Clarín and he has published in Aldonza, Angélica, Arquitrave, Calandrajas, Downtown Brooklyn, El Súmmum, Grama, Hélice, Hermes, Hueso Húmero, Manxa, Poesía española, Reloj de arena, Revistatlántica y Turia.
