= Downtown Brooklyn: A Journal of Writing =

Annual American literary magazine (1992-2018)

Downtown Brooklyn: A Journal of Writing (ISSN 1536-8475) was an American literary magazine which was published annually between 1992 and 2018.

== History and profile ==
Downtown Brooklyn was founded by the poets Barbara Henning, Rudy Baron and Wayne Berninger.

The first annual issue appeared in 1992.

The magazine was published annually and was edited by faculty and students in the English Department at the Brooklyn Campus of Long Island University.

The editors accepted submissions of poetry, literary prose, and visual art from present and past faculty, staff and students at the campus, although cover art was at times solicited from local artists who had shown their work in campus galleries.

Downtown Brooklyn went online in 2014. Issues number 23-25 appeared as PDFs, and issues number 26-27 appeared in the form of Tumblr blogs. Issue 27 was the final issue.

Full sets of print back-issues are available in the Periodicals Collection of Salena Library at Long Island University (Brooklyn Campus) and in the Little Magazine Collection of Memorial Library at The University of Wisconsin–Madison.
