= Juan Alfon =

Spanish painter

Juan Alfon, born at Toledo, painted, in 1418, several altar-screens for the cathedral of that city, which are still preserved.
