= Cancionero general =

Lyric poetry anthology of the Middle Ages or Renaissance

The Cancionero general or Cancionero general de Hernando del Castillo is a lyric poetry anthology of the late Middle Ages or the early Renaissance. It is mostly devoted to the production in the kingdoms of Castile and León under Enrique IV and the Catholic Monarchs, Isabel de Castilla and Fernando de Aragon. Hernando del Castillo is responsible for the compilation which began around 1490 and was first printed in 1511 under the name of Cancionero general de muchos y diversos autores.

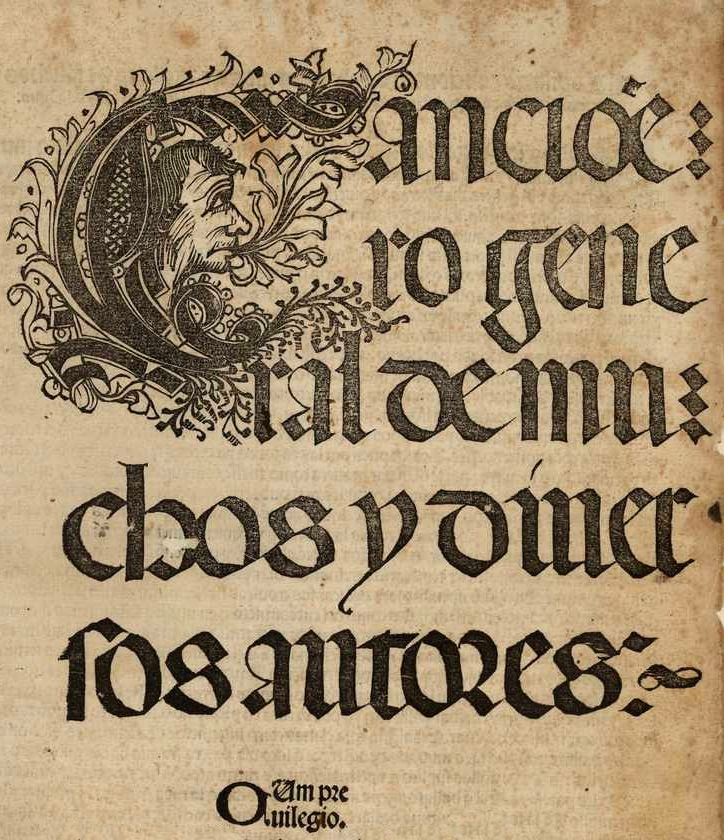
Cancionero general

== Structure ==
The work is divided into nine parts according to their themes:

- Devoción y moralidad
- Obras de poetas diversos
- Canciones
- Invenciones y letras de justadores
- Motes y sus glosas
- Villancicos
- Preguntas y respuestas
- Obras menudas
- Obras de burlas

== Editions ==
The first edition of the Cancionero General was printed by Cristóbal Koffman in Valencia in 1511, and was frequently reprinted:

- Valencia, 1511, Cristóbal Koffman.
- Valencia, 1514, Jorge Costilla.
- Toledo, 1517, 1520 y 1527, Juan de Villaquirán.
- Sevilla, 1535 y 1540, Juan Cromberger.
- Amberes, 1557 y 1573, Martín Nucio.

Some of its editions were censored, particularly the section on "burlas."
