= Josefina Manresa =

Spanish seamstress and curator of the work of the poet Miguel Hernández (1916–1987)

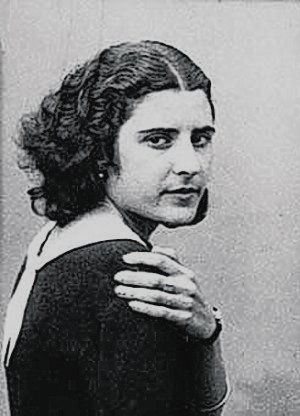
- Josefina Manresa
- Born: Josefa Manresa Marhuenda; 2 January 1916; Quesada, Jaén, Spain
- Died: 18 February 1987 (aged 71); Elche, Alicante, Spain
- Occupations: seamstress; literary curator
- Known for: preserving and curating the literary legacy of Miguel Hernández
- Notable work: Recuerdos de la viuda de Miguel Hernández
- Spouse: Miguel Hernández
- Children: Manuel Ramón (1937–1938), Manuel Miguel (1939–1984)

Josefa Manresa Marhuenda, known as Josefina Manresa (2 January 1916 – 18 February 1987), was a Spanish seamstress and the wife of poet Miguel Hernández. She is recognized for her work in preserving and curating the poet's literary legacy during and after the Francoist period in Spain.

== Early life ==
Josefina Manresa was born in Quesada, Jaén, in 1916. Her family moved to Orihuela in 1927, where she received only a year of elementary education before starting work as a seamstress at the age of thirteen.

== Marriage to Miguel Hernández ==
Manresa met Miguel Hernández in 1933. Their courtship was formal and reserved, and they married in 1937, shortly before the outbreak of the Spanish Civil War. The couple's life was marked by hardship: her father was killed during the war, her mother died soon after, and their first son, Manuel Ramón, died in infancy. Their second son, Manuel Miguel, was born in 1939 and lived until 1984.

After Hernández's death in prison in 1942, Manresa dedicated her life to safeguarding his literary work. During the Franco dictatorship, she hid manuscripts, letters, and drawings in a family chest and sometimes even buried them to protect them from police searches and repression. She also entrusted some documents to friends for safekeeping during periods of heightened danger. Without her efforts, much of Hernández's poetry and correspondence might have been lost.

In the post-Franco era, Manresa worked to bring Hernández's work to public attention, collaborating with editors and donating materials to municipal archives in Elche. She published her memoir, Recuerdos de la viuda de Miguel Hernández (Memories of Miguel Hernández' life, 1980), offering a personal account of her life with the poet and the challenges she faced as his widow.

== Death ==
Manresa lived in Elche from 1950, supporting herself and her son through sewing. In her later years, she received a pension and recognition from the city of Elche for her role in preserving Hernández's legacy. She died of cancer in 1987 and is buried in the cemetery of Alicante, alongside her husband and son.

Josefina Manresa is commemorated for her crucial role in the preservation of Miguel Hernández's work. The Museo Miguel Hernández-Josefina Manresa in Quesada, Jaén, houses a major part of the poet's legacy and honors her contribution to Spanish literary heritage.
